= We Light the Way =

- House of the Dragon episode
- Episode no.: Season 1 Episode 5
- Directed by: Clare Kilner
- Written by: Charmaine DeGraté
- Cinematography by: Alejandro Martinez
- Editing by: Crispin Green
- Original air date: September 18, 2022
- Running time: 60 minutes

Episode chronology
← Previous "King of the Narrow Sea"	Next → "The Princess and the Queen"
- House of the Dragon season 1

"We Light the Way" is the fifth episode of the first season of the fantasy drama television series House of the Dragon, a prequel to Game of Thrones. Its title is the motto of House Hightower, one of the fictional noble families featured in the series. The episode was written by Charmaine DeGraté, and directed by Clare Kilner. It first aired on HBO and HBO Max on September 18, 2022.

The plot depicts Daemon visiting his estranged wife, Rhea Royce, in the Vale and the wedding of Princess Rhaenyra Targaryen and Ser Laenor Velaryon.

In the United States, "We Light the Way" gained a viewership of 1.8 million during its premiere night on linear television alone. It received mostly positive reviews, with critics praising Emily Carey's performance, the conversation between Laenor and Rhaenyra at Driftmark, and the wedding sequence.

The episode marks the final appearance of Emily Carey as young Alicent Hightower.

== Plot ==
Daemon murders his estranged wife, Lady Rhea Royce, framing her death as a hunting accident.

Viserys and Rhaenyra sail to Driftmark to arrange the princess's marriage to Ser Laenor Velaryon, the son of Lord Corlys and Princess Rhaenys, thus uniting the Targaryen and Velaryon Houses. Knowing Laenor is homosexual, Rhaenyra tells him that, once married, they can perform their royal duties and be free to have lovers. Later, Ser Criston Cole proposes that he and Rhaenyra elope to Essos and assume new identities. Rhaenyra refuses to give up her place as heir to the Iron Throne and tells Ser Criston she wishes for him to remain her lover. Criston, feeling used, despairs over having broken his Kingsguard vows.

Before leaving the city after his dismissal, Otto warns Alicent that if Rhaenyra ascends the throne, Alicent's sons will be considered a threat to Rhaenyra's rule. Larys Strong, the son of Viserys's new Hand, slyly asks Alicent about Rhaenyra's health, mentioning she was given a medicinal drink. Alicent questions Criston about allegations that Rhaenyra and Daemon had sex. Criston, misunderstanding, confesses that he was intimate with the princess. Rhaenyra's dishonesty distresses Alicent.

At a feast celebrating Rhaenyra and Laenor's forthcoming nuptials, Alicent interrupts Viserys' speech, entering the hall wearing a green gown matching House Hightower's signal color for a call to arms. Her uncle, Lord Hobert, promises her full political support. Daemon unexpectedly attends and is confronted by Ser Gerold Royce about Rhea's death. Daemon then flirts with Lady Laena, Corlys and Rhaenys' daughter. Daemon privately questions Rhaenyra about her marriage; to which she mocks him and says he should wed her if he desires the throne.

Laenor's lover, Ser Joffrey Lonmouth, correctly deduces that Criston is Rhaenyra's paramour. He introduces himself to Criston and asks for help protecting his secret, noting that Criston has more to lose if his own secret comes out. Criston, taking this as blackmail, is enraged and beats Joffrey to death, bringing the feast to a disastrous and devastating end. Rhaenyra and Laenor are hastily wed in a private ceremony the same night. The frail Viserys collapses immediately after the ceremony is completed. Later, as Criston is about to commit suicide, Alicent interrupts him.

== Production ==
=== Writing ===
"We Light the Way" was written by Charmaine DeGraté, marking her first time in the Game of Thrones franchise. The episode's title refers to the motto of House Hightower, one of the fictional noble families featured in the series.

=== Filming ===
The episode was directed by Clare Kilner, making it her second directorial credit for the series, following the previous episode "King of the Narrow Sea".

Castleton, a village located in Derbyshire, England, served as the location for the opening scene in the Vale, while the scenes at Driftmark were filmed on St. Michael's Mount island, in Mount's Bay, Cornwall, England.

=== Casting ===
The episode stars Paddy Considine as King Viserys I Targaryen, Matt Smith as Prince Daemon Targaryen, Rhys Ifans as Ser Otto Hightower, Steve Toussaint as Lord Corlys Velaryon, Eve Best as Princess Rhaenys Targaryen, Fabien Frankel as Ser Criston Cole, Milly Alcock as Young Princess Rhaenyra Targaryen, Emily Carey as Young Queen Alicent Hightower, Graham McTavish as Ser Harrold Westerling, Matthew Needham as Larys "Clubfoot" Strong, and Jefferson Hall as twin brothers Lord Jason and Ser Tyland Lannister.

The episode marks the final appearance of Emily Carey, Milly Alcock and Theo Nate as the younger versions of Alicent, Rhaenera and Laenor Velaryon, respectively, due to the 10-year time jump between this and the succeeding episode, in which these characters are portrayed as adults by Olivia Cooke, Emma D'Arcy and John Macmillan, respectively. It also marks the first and only appearances of Rachel Redford as Lady Rhea Royce and Savannah Steyn as the teenage Laena Velaryon, who was portrayed as a younger child by Nova Foueillis-Mose in the first and second episodes, in which the adult version is subsequently portrayed by Nanna Blondell; and the final appearances of recurring cast members Solly McLeod as Ser Joffrey Lonmouth and David Horovitch as Grand Maester Mellos, who is later confirmed to have died sometime in between the time jump.

== Reception ==
=== Ratings ===
An estimated 1.83 million viewers watched "We Light the Way" during its first broadcast on HBO. 2.58 million viewers watched the episode across its four broadcasts on HBO, an increase of around 4% from the previous episode. The viewership of the episode on all platforms in the US was 3% more than the fourth episode.

=== Critical response ===
The episode received mostly positive reviews. On the review aggregator Rotten Tomatoes, it holds an approval rating of 85% based on 107 reviews, with an average rating of 7.5/10. The website's critical consensus said, "Holding true to the Westerosi rule that no wedding goes according to plan, 'We Light the Way' is a disturbing midpoint for House of the Dragon, punctuated by shocking brutality and Queen Alicent coming into her own."

The episode received a rating of 5 out of 5 stars from Michael Deacon of The Telegraph, 4 out of 5 stars from Molly Edwards of GamesRadar+ and 3 out of 5 stars from Alec Bojalad of Den of Geek, a "B-" grade from Jenna Scherer of The A.V. Club, and a "good" score of 7 out of 10 from Helen O'Hara of IGN. In his review, Deacon called the episode "the most action-packed, and best, installment to date" and praised Rhaenyra's character development. Edwards said, "We've crossed the halfway point of House of the Dragon’s first season, and, as we head into that final stretch of episodes, the battle lines have been drawn. [...] The board is set for the wars to come – and that legendary Targaryen dynasty is more fragile than ever," and further praised Carey's performance." Bojalad criticized the characterization of Ser Criston Cole in the episode, but praised the conversation between Rhaenyra and Laenor at Driftmark, and summarized his review by saying, "House of the Dragon is at its best when viewers can feel the weight of history pressing down upon every moment. It’s why most of the various conversations and negotiations in the episode work. It’s also why the more literal, kinetic moments don’t. When the mere sight of a young woman wearing a green dress is enough to bring an entire wedding to a grinding halt, we don't need Ser Criston Cole to crush some other guy's face in for good measure. As House of the Dragon continues on, hopefully it will pick up on that lesson and let our imaginations run free." O'Hara wrote in her verdict, "This week has another talky episode, but one that further exposes the schisms in the Targaryen clan. [...] But excellent performances keep it interesting, especially from Milly Alcock and Emily Carey as they wind up their run before the big time jump."

However, the episode drew criticism from critics and fans alike for its portrayal of the death of Joffrey and its supposed use of the "bury your gays" trope, a pattern by which LGBT characters in film and TV are supposedly killed off at a much higher rate than heterosexual characters because they are deemed more expendable.

=== Accolades ===
Year	Award	Category	Nominee	Result	Ref.
2023	Primetime Emmy Awards	Outstanding Makeup (Non-Prosthetic)	Amanda Knight, Hannah Eccleston, Heather McMullen, Kashiya Hinds, Harriet Thompson, Natalie Wickens and Bonny Monger	Nominated	
