= House of the Dragon season 1 =

Season of streaming series

House of the Dragon
- Season 1
- Home media cover art
- Showrunners: Ryan Condal; Miguel Sapochnik
- Starring: Paddy Considine; Matt Smith; Emma D'Arcy; Rhys Ifans; Steve Toussaint; Eve Best; Sonoya Mizuno; Fabien Frankel; Milly Alcock; Emily Carey; Graham McTavish; Matthew Needham; Jefferson Hall; Olivia Cooke; Harry Collett; Tom Glynn-Carney; Ewan Mitchell; Bethany Antonia; Phoebe Campbell; Phia Saban
- No. of episodes: 10

Release
- Original network: HBO
- Original release: August 21 – October 23, 2022

Season chronology
- Next → Season 2

The first season of the American fantasy drama television series House of the Dragon premiered on HBO on August 21, 2022, in the United States and concluded on October 23, 2022. It consists of ten episodes, each of approximately one hour. The series is based on Fire & Blood, a prequel novel in the A Song of Ice and Fire series by George R. R. Martin, adapted for television by Ryan Condal and Martin. Following the conclusion of its predecessor series Game of Thrones, in October 2019, HBO ordered the first season, which began filming in April 2021, primarily in the United Kingdom, Spain, and Portugal.

The story takes place upon the continent of Westeros, set nearly 200 years before the events of Game of Thrones. The season follows the rise of Princess Rhaenyra Targaryen to the throne after her father King Viserys I Targaryen chooses her as his heir. However, Viserys' decision breaks an inheritance principle and a century tradition of only naming male heirs, which leads to a turmoil that slowly starts to divide the House Targaryen, while Rhaenyra struggles with the responsibilities of being the heiress of the Iron Throne. As the tensions between the Targaryens grow, the Hand of the King Otto Hightower conspires to usurp Rhaenyra as the ruler of the Seven Kingdoms, by having his daughter Alicent Hightower married to Viserys, who fathers the Prince Aegon II Targaryen.

House of the Dragon features a large ensemble cast, including established actors such as Paddy Considine, Matt Smith, Olivia Cooke, Rhys Ifans, Steve Toussaint, Eve Best, Sonoya Mizuno, and Graham McTavish. Newer actors were cast as the younger generation of characters, such as Emma D'Arcy, Milly Alcock, Emily Carey, and Fabien Frankel. Critics praised the character development, visual effects, writing, Ramin Djawadi's score, and performances; Smith's and D'arcy's performances as Daemon Targaryen and Rhaenyra respectively, received multiple accolades. However, the pacing, specifically of the time jumps, and the dark lighting of some scenes were criticized. The first season won one of the nine Emmy Awards for which it was nominated, with one of the nominees being for Outstanding Drama Series. Over 10 million viewers watched the series premiere across the linear channels and HBO Max on the first day, the biggest audience in HBO's history. A second season was ordered in August 2022.

== Episodes ==
No. overall	No. in season	Title	Directed by	Written by	Original release date	U.S. viewers (millions)
1	1	"The Heirs of the Dragon"	Miguel Sapochnik	Ryan Condal	August 21, 2022	2.17
With both his sons dead, old King Jaehaerys I Targaryen convenes a Great Council to choose an heir. The Westerosi lords select Jaehaerys's eldest grandson, Prince Viserys, over Princess Rhaenys, the eldest grandchild. Nine years later, King Viserys organizes a tournament to celebrate Queen Aemma Arryn's pregnancy, confident she carries his long-awaited male heir. The Small Council disregards Master of Ships Lord Corlys Velaryon's warning that the Triarchy, an alliance of Essos's Free Cities, threatens to cripple Westerosi shipping lanes. Hand of the King, Ser Otto Hightower, criticizes Viserys's brother and heir, Prince Daemon, for his brutality as the City Watch commander, in response to Daemon and his men dismembering and/or murdering seemingly random commonfolk. At the tournament, Ser Criston Cole, a young common-born knight, outcompetes Daemon. Meanwhile, Viserys sacrifices Aemma in childbirth, authorizing a C-section. Their newborn son, Baelon, then dies. Viserys refuses the council's pleas to appoint a new heir until Otto reveals that Daemon mockingly styled Baelon as "The Heir for a Day." Outraged, Viserys banishes Daemon from King's Landing and appoints his only living child, Princess Rhaenyra, heir to the Iron Throne, revealing to her Aegon the Conqueror's dream that inspired him to unify Westeros.
2	2	"The Rogue Prince"	Greg Yaitanes	Ryan Condal	August 28, 2022	2.26
Six months later, Daemon has illegally occupied Castle Dragonstone. Prince-Admiral Craghas Drahar, known as the Crabfeeder, menaces the Stepstones archipelago at the Essos Triarchy's behest. The Small Council dismisses Rhaenyra's suggestion to show force and instead relegates her to appoint a new Kingsguard knight. Ignoring others' advice, she chooses Criston, the only knight with actual battle experience. Ser Otto sends his teenage daughter, Lady Alicent, to console the grieving king; she advises Viserys to discuss his kingly duty to remarry with Rhaenyra. Lord Corlys and his wife, Princess Rhaenys, propose that Viserys unite their Valyrian houses by marrying their twelve-year-old daughter, Laena. Meanwhile, the Small Council learns that Daemon, proclaiming himself the true heir, stole a dragon egg and intends to marry his mistress, Mysaria, as a secondary spouse. Otto and a small detachment sail to Dragonstone to retrieve the egg. Rhaenyra follows on her dragon, Syrax, and forces Daemon to renounce his false claims and return the egg. Viserys announces his intention to wed Alicent, angering Corlys, who proposes an alliance with Daemon.
3	3	"Second of His Name"	Greg Yaitanes	Gabe Fonseca & Ryan Condal	September 4, 2022	1.75
For three years, Lord Corlys and Prince Daemon have battled the Crabfeeder and his forces in the Stepstones without the Iron Throne's support. Meanwhile, King Viserys plans a great hunt to celebrate his and pregnant Queen Alicent's son Aegon's second birthday. Rhaenyra resents her father's excessive attention towards her half-brother, Aegon. The ailing king insists that Rhaenyra, now seventeen, must marry to form a strong alliance and protect their lineage. Many suitors are considered, including two-year-old Prince Aegon. Lord Lyonel Strong recommends Ser Laenor Velaryon, Lord Corlys's son, as a potential match to mend the rift between the two houses. Overcoming previous doubts, Viserys assures Rhaenyra she remains his heir and can choose her consort. Meanwhile, brothers Hobert and Otto Hightower secretly scheme to make Aegon the successor, furthering their family's power and prestige. After Ser Vaemond Velaryon pleads for the king's help, Viserys sends aid to the Stepstones. Seeing his brother's support as ending his chance to prove himself, Daemon acts as bait to ambush and kill the Crabfeeder, winning the ensuing battle before the crown's forces arrive.
4	4	"King of the Narrow Sea"	Clare Kilner	Ira Parker	September 11, 2022	1.81
After an unsuccessful months-long tour to choose a consort, Rhaenyra returns to King's Landing. Daemon also returns after conquering most of the Stepstones. Now called "King of the Narrow Sea", Daemon swears allegiance to Viserys and hands over his crown. As the reunited brothers celebrate, Alicent and Rhaenyra reconcile. After dark, Daemon and Rhaenyra sneak out to explore King's Landing, attend a bawdy play, and visit a brothel. Daemon seduces a willing Rhaenyra, but unable to consummate their affair, he abandons her there. Returning to the Red Keep, Rhaenyra seduces Criston. Informed by the White Worm's spy, Otto informs the king about Daemon and Rhaenyra's carousing. Alicent overhears and privately questions Rhaenyra, who swears she is still a maid. Viserys confronts a hungover and disheveled Daemon, who seemingly confirms the rumors and proposes that he wed Rhaenyra. Viserys claims Daemon only wants the crown and exiles him to the Vale. To avoid scandal and strengthen the throne, Viserys orders Rhaenyra to marry Laenor. Viserys dismisses Otto as his Hand after Rhaenyra accuses Otto of manipulating him for his personal gain. Grand Maester Mellos gives Rhaenyra a precautionary abortifacient tea at Viserys' request.
5	5	"We Light the Way"	Clare Kilner	Charmaine DeGraté	September 18, 2022	1.83
In the Vale, Daemon murders his wife, Lady Rhea Royce. Before departing King's Landing, Ser Otto warns Queen Alicent that Rhaenyra becoming queen would make Alicent's two sons a threat to the crown. Rhaenyra and Laenor are betrothed, mollifying Lord Corlys. Understanding Laenor's homosexuality, Rhaenyra proposes fulfilling their royal duties to produce heirs, then pursue their own lovers. Criston is humiliated when Rhaenyra declines his proposal to elope to Essos and assume new identities; she prefers their current sexual liaison. Alicent questions Criston about Rhaenyra and Daemon, but after misunderstanding, he confesses to being Rhaenyra's lover. During Rhaenyra and Laenor's betrothal celebration, Alicent enters, interrupting Viserys's speech, wearing a green gown, the signal color for House Hightower's call to arms. Daemon also unexpectedly attends. Confronted by Rhea's cousin, Daemon denies murdering her and wishes to assert his claim to inherit her lands. Laenor's lover, Ser Joffrey Lonmouth, surmises Criston is Rhaenyra's paramour. When Criston believes Joffrey is threatening blackmail, he brutally kills him, devastating Laenor and horrifying guests. Rhaenyra and Laenor are privately wed late that night. Viserys collapses after the ceremony. Alicent intervenes as a disgraced Criston is about to commit suicide.
6	6	"The Princess and the Queen"	Miguel Sapochnik	Sara Hess	September 25, 2022	1.86
Ten years later, Rhaenyra has three sons: Jacaerys ("Jace"), Lucerys ("Luke"), and newborn Joffrey. All lack the signature Valyrian platinum hair, but King Viserys rejects Queen Alicent's assertion that Ser Laenor is not their father. Alicent tells Aegon that, as Viserys's firstborn son, he must prepare to dispute Rhaenyra's claim to the throne. Daemon and his wife, Laena Velaryon, reside in Pentos with their daughters Baela and Rhaena. The prince of Pentos offers them a lordship in exchange for an alliance against a resurgent Triarchy. After agonizing labor leaves her unable to give birth, Laena commands her dragon, Vhagar, to incinerate her. Criston, now serving Alicent, goads Ser Harwin Strong into attacking him by implying Harwin fathered Rhaenyra's children. To ease family strife, Rhaenyra proposes that Jace marry Helaena, Alicent's daughter; Alicent refuses. Lord Lyonel Strong, Hand of the King, escorts his son Harwin to Harrenhal Castle. It is implied that Harwin fathered Rhaenyra's sons. Alicent confides to Lyonel's younger son, Larys, that she wishes her father, Ser Otto, was still the King's Hand. Larys recruits three criminals to set a fire at Harrenhal, killing Lyonel and Harwin. Rhaenyra moves her household to Dragonstone, also bringing Laenor's lover, Ser Qarl Correy.
7	7	"Driftmark"	Miguel Sapochnik	Kevin Lau	October 2, 2022	1.88
King Viserys and his court attend Lady Laena's funeral in Driftmark. Viserys fails to reconcile with Daemon, but Rhaenyra and Daemon reunite and have sex. Prince Aemond claims Vhagar as his dragon, causing an altercation with his cousins and nephews in which Luke slashes Aemond's eye with a knife. As revenge, Queen Alicent lunges at Luke with Viserys's Valyrian steel dagger. Rhaenyra blocks Alicent but injures herself. Viserys decrees that anyone claiming Rhaenyra's sons are bastards will be punished. Later, Otto Hightower, who has been reinstated as Hand of the King, assures Alicent they will prevail, while Rhaenyra and Daemon unite against Alicent and her family. Qarl appears to murder Laenor, leaving behind a charred body. Daemon and Rhaenyra privately marry in the old Valyrian Dragonlord tradition to perpetuate the Targaryen bloodline. Laenor, having faked his death, escapes Driftmark with Qarl.
8	8	"The Lord of the Tides"	Geeta Vasant Patel	Eileen Shim	October 9, 2022	1.73
Six years later, Lord Corlys Velaryon is wounded fighting in the Stepstones. His brother, Ser Vaemond, petitions King's Landing to name him Corlys's heir, asserting Rhaenyra's sons are illegitimate. To defend their claim, Rhaenyra and Daemon return to the capital. King Viserys is now bedridden, disfigured, and mentally muddled. Queen Alicent and the king's Hand, Otto Hightower, oversee all royal matters. Alicent covers up Prince Aegon's rape of a handmaiden. Rhaenyra proposes two marriage arrangements with House Velaryon to gain Princess Rhaenys's support. She implores Viserys to defend her succession, quoting Aegon the Conqueror's dream about the Prince That Was Promised. Vaemond's petition is presented at court, and Viserys reaffirms Luke's position as the heir to Driftmark. Daemon beheads Vaemond when he denounces Rhaenyra and her children. The family appears to reconcile during a feast, but Aemond later incites a fight. Meanwhile, Alicent's lady-in-waiting, Talya, regularly provides Daemon's former mistress, Mysaria, with information. Viserys, near death and mistaking Alicent for Rhaenyra, mutters parts of Aegon the Conqueror's dream, which Alicent mistakenly believes refers to Prince Aegon.
9	9	"The Green Council"	Clare Kilner	Sara Hess	October 16, 2022	1.56
After Viserys's death, Ser Otto and the Small Council plot to crown Prince Aegon. Criston unintentionally kills Lord Beesbury, who opposed the scheme. Kingsguard Lord Commander Harrold Westerling resigns in protest. Otto keeps Viserys's death a secret to fortify the council's position, then coerces the noble houses to switch their allegiance to Aegon. Those resisting are imprisoned or hanged. Otto and Alicent discuss whether to kill or exile Rhaenyra and separately rush to find and influence the missing Prince Aegon: Otto sends Kingsguard brothers Ser Erryk and Ser Arryk Cargyll, while Alicent tasks Criston and Prince Aemond. The Cargylls find Aegon first, but Criston and Aemond forcibly take him. Lord Larys tells Alicent that spies, including Lady-in-Waiting Talya, are within the Red Keep. Alicent approves of eliminating the head spy. Alicent persuades a resistant Aegon to claim his birthright. King's Landing citizens are herded into the Dragonpit to witness Aegon's coronation. Princess Rhaenys, refusing to support Aegon's claim, is held captive. Erryk frees her, and she enters the Dragonpit caverns. Astride her dragon, Meleys, she violently breaches the grand hall, causing mayhem, death, and threatening the royals; Rhaenys then flees King's Landing on Meleys.
10	10	"The Black Queen"	Greg Yaitanes	Ryan Condal	October 23, 2022	1.85
Princess Rhaenys arrives on Dragonstone to announce King Viserys's death and Prince Aegon's ascending the throne; the news shocks Rhaenyra into a premature stillbirth. Daemon pressures Rhaenyra to go to war. When Ser Erryk brings Viserys's crown, Rhaenyra is declared queen. Otto presents King Aegon II's terms for Rhaenyra's concession, including retaining her royal title and Dragonstone and her son's rights to inherit Driftmark; Daemon is angered when Rhaenyra considers conceding to unify the realm against the Northern threat foretold by Aegon the Conqueror's dream. Corlys pledges House Velaryon's allegiance to Rhaenyra's "Black" faction; Daemon plans to recruit more dragonriders and awakens a large dragon hibernating in a cave. Princes Jace and Luke are sent as envoys to secure Houses Arryn, Stark, and Baratheon as allies. Luke meets with Lord Borros Baratheon and discovers Prince Aemond is also there to secure the Baratheons as allies for Aegon II. King Aegon II offered Borros a political alliance through marriage between his daughter and Aemond, while Rhaenyra offered nothing. Luke leaves on his dragon, Arrax, but Aemond pursues him on Vhagar. The fractious dragons defy their riders; Arrax burns Vhagar; Vhagar then devours Luke and Arrax, stunning Aemond. Rhaenyra is devastated and enraged upon receiving the news.

== Cast and characters ==
=== Main ===
- Paddy Considine as Viserys I Targaryen
- Matt Smith as Daemon Targaryen
- Emma D'Arcy as Rhaenyra Targaryen
  - Milly Alcock portrays young Rhaenyra Targaryen
- Rhys Ifans as Otto Hightower
- Steve Toussaint as Corlys Velaryon
- Eve Best as Rhaenys Targaryen
- Sonoya Mizuno as Mysaria
- Fabien Frankel as Criston Cole
- Olivia Cooke as Alicent Hightower
  - Emily Carey portrays young Alicent Hightower
- Graham McTavish as Harrold Westerling
- Matthew Needham as Larys Strong
- Jefferson Hall as identical twins: Jason Lannister and Tyland Lannister
- Harry Collett as Jacaerys "Jace" Velaryon
  - Leo Hart portrays young Jacaerys Velaryon (guest)
- Tom Glynn-Carney as Aegon II Targaryen
  - Ty Tennant portrays young Aegon Targaryen (guest)
- Ewan Mitchell as Aemond Targaryen
  - Leo Ashton portrays young Aemond Targaryen (guest)
- Bethany Antonia as Baela Targaryen
  - Shani Smethurst portrays young Baela Targaryen (guest)
- Phoebe Campbell as Rhaena Targaryen
  - Eva Ossei-Gerning portrays young Rhaena Targaryen (guest)
- Phia Saban as Helaena Targaryen
  - Evie Allen portrays young Helaena Targaryen (guest)

=== Recurring ===
- David Horovitch as Mellos
- Bill Paterson as Lyman Beesbury
- Gavin Spokes as Lyonel Strong
- Steffan Rhodri as Hobert Hightower
- Elliott Tittensor as Erryk Cargyll
- Luke Tittensor as Arryk Cargyll
- John Macmillan as Laenor Velaryon
  - Theo Nate portrays young Laenor Velaryon
  - Matthew Carver portrays child Laenor Velaryon
- Nanna Blondell as Laena Velaryon
  - Savannah Steyn portrays young Laena Velaryon
  - Nova Foueillis-Mosé portrays child Laena Velaryon
- Anthony Flanagan as Steffon Darklyn
- Ryan Corr as Harwin Strong
- Wil Johnson as Vaemond Velaryon
- Kurt Egyiawan as Orwyle
- Elliot Grihault as Lucerys "Luke" Velaryon
  - Harvey Sadler portrays young Lucerys Velaryon
- Paul Kennedy as Jasper Wylde
- Alexis Raben as Talya
- Jordon Stevens as Elinda Massey
- Paul Hickey as Allun Caswell
- Phil Daniels as Gerardys

=== Guest ===
- Sian Brooke as Aemma Arryn
- Michael Carter as Jaehaerys I Targaryen
- Garry Cooper as Ryam Redwyne
- Julian Lewis Jones as Boremund Baratheon
- David Hounslow as Rickon Stark
- Frankie Wilson as Randyll Barret
- Gary Raymond as The High Septon
- Daniel Scott-Smith as Craghas Drahar
- Solly McLeod as Joffrey Lonmouth
- Edward Rowe as Howland Sharp
- Lucy Briers as Ceira Lannister
- Joanna David as Joselyn Redwyne
- Alana Ramsey as Lynesse Hightower
- Chris David Storer as Humfrey Bracken
- Gabriel Scott as Jerrel Bracken
- Alfie Todd as Willem Blackwood
- Paul Leonard as Beric Dondarrion
- Ben Dilloway as Soren
- Owen Oakeshott as Gerold Royce
- Rachel Redford as Rhea Royce
- Arty Froushan as Qarl Correy
- Patrice Naiambana as the Dragonkeeper Elder
- Dean Nolan as Reggio Haratis
- Haqi Ali as Kelvyn
- Max Wrottesley as Lorent Marbrand
- Maddie Evans as Dyana
- Michelle Bonnard as Sylvi
- Simon Chandler as High Septon Eustace
- Miriam Lucia as Lady Fell
- Paul Clayton as Lord Merryweather
- Roger Evans as Borros Baratheon
- Nicholas Jones as Bartimos Celtigar
- Michael Elwyn as Simon Staunton

== Production ==
=== Development ===
In 2015, with Game of Thrones still in production, HBO executives approached A Song of Ice and Fire writer George R. R. Martin regarding possible successors or spin-offs to the series. In November 2018, Martin stated that a "potential spin-off series would be solidly based on material in Fire & Blood." Game of Thrones creators David Benioff and D. B. Weiss stated they wanted to "move on" from the franchise and declined involvement in subsequent projects. By September 2019, a Game of Thrones prequel series from Martin and Ryan Condal that "tracks the beginning of the end for House Targaryen" was close to receiving a pilot order from HBO. The following month, House of the Dragon was given a straight-to-series order. Condal and Miguel Sapochnik, who won an Emmy Award for directing the episode "Battle of the Bastards", were selected to serve as showrunners. A second season was ordered in August 2022.

=== Casting ===
Casting for the first season began in July 2020. In October 2020, Paddy Considine was cast as Viserys I Targaryen. Considine was offered a role in Game of Thrones but declined due to the fantasy elements of the series. Condal in a 2020 interview stated that Considine was their first choice for Viserys. By December, Olivia Cooke, Matt Smith, and Emma D'Arcy were cast as Alicent Hightower, Daemon Targaryen, and Rhaenyra Targaryen, respectively. In an interview with The Hollywood Reporter, Smith stated he was initially hesitant to star in a Game of Thrones prequel but accepted the role after learning of Considine's attachment to the project.

In February 2021, Rhys Ifans, Steve Toussaint, Eve Best, and Sonoya Mizuno were added to the main cast. By April, Fabien Frankel joined the cast as Criston Cole. In May, Graham McTavish was spotted on set in full wardrobe. In July 2021, Emily Carey and Milly Alcock were added to the cast as younger counterparts of Alicent Hightower and Rhaenyra Targaryen, respectively. The time jump midway through the first season prompted the casting of multiple actors for the same role.

=== Filming ===
Principal photography on the ten-episode first season of the series began in April 2021. The series was filmed primarily in the United Kingdom. House of the Dragon was the first production to be shot at Warner Bros. Leavesden Studios' new virtual production stage. On July 18, 2021, a positive COVID-19 case forced the pausing of production for two days. The Spanish publication Hoy reported that House of the Dragon would be filmed in the Province of Cáceres in western Spain between October 11–21, 2021. The provincial capital of Cáceres along with the medieval town of Trujillo were used in scenes for King's Landing. From October 26–31, the series was filmed in Portugal at the Castle of Monsanto. The majority of season 1 was shot using Arri Alexa cameras; specifically Alexa 65s for the main camera and the Alexa Mini LFs as additional cameras.

Locations in Cornwall, England included St Michael's Mount, Holywell Beach and Kynance Cove. Other locations included Castleton, Derbyshire, in areas such as Cave Dale, Eldon Hill Quarry and the Market Place. Some scenes were shot in Aldershot, Hampshire. In February 2022, HBO confirmed that the first season of House of the Dragon had wrapped production. Visual effects for the series were produced in part by Pixomondo, who worked on Game of Thrones and received an Emmy Award for Outstanding Visual Effects. In October 2022, it was reported that the OSVP stage at Leavesden Studios, used in the series, was shutting down.

=== Music ===
It was announced in February 2021 that Ramin Djawadi would compose the series score. Djawadi and the showrunners opted to retain the original theme song, "Game of Thrones Theme", for House of the Dragon. The song debuted in the opening credits of the second episode. For the first season, Djawadi, along with Condal and Sapochnik, watched each episode and made notes on when the music should occur and what mood the music should set.

The 44-track score album was released by WaterTower Music on October 24, 2022, a day after the season finale premiered.

== Release ==
=== Broadcast ===
House of the Dragon premiered on August 21, 2022. It is HBO's first new series to stream in 4K, Dolby Vision HDR and Dolby Atmos on its sister streaming platform HBO Max. The first episode was released for free on YouTube on September 2, 2022. The first-season finale was leaked online the week before the actual air date, with the full episode appearing on torrent sites. According to HBO, the leak came from a Europe, the Middle East and Africa partner and it will "aggressively" monitor for additional leaks.

=== International broadcast ===
In New Zealand, the series will be distributed by Sky's SoHo TV channel and Neon streaming service. In India, Disney+ Hotstar is set to distribute the show. In the UK, Ireland, Italy, Germany, Austria and Switzerland, the series will air on Sky Atlantic. In Canada, House of the Dragon will be available on Bell Media's Crave streaming service and its HBO linear channel.

=== Home media ===
The first season was released on 4K UHD Blu-ray (including a SteelBook special edition), standard Blu-ray, and DVD on December 20, 2022, and contains over an hour of behind-the-scenes features.

== Reception ==
=== Critical response ===
House of the Dragon season 1: Critical reception by episode
Season 1 (2022): Percentage of positive critics' reviews tracked by the website Rotten Tomatoes

On the review aggregation website Rotten Tomatoes, the first season holds an approval rating of 90% based on 873 reviews, with an average rating of 7.85/10. The website's critical consensus reads, "Covering an era of tenuous peace with ferocious – albeit abbreviated – focus, House of the Dragon is an impressive prequel that exemplifies the court intrigue that distinguished its predecessor." On Metacritic, which uses a weighted average, the first season received a score of 69 out of 100 based on 43 critic reviews, indicating "generally favorable reviews".

Reviews for the first season were positive, with critics praising the writing, directing, score, and cast performances. Lucy Mangan of The Guardian called the show a "roaring success" with Lorraine Ali of the Los Angeles Times stating the show mirrors the acclaim of the early seasons of Game of Thrones. Reviews pointed out the reliance on Martin's work was one of the reasons the series fared better critically than the later seasons of its predecessor, specifically the last season. The cast also received praise, with Paddy Considine, Matt Smith, Emma D'Arcy, and Olivia Cooke being singled out for their performances. In an interview with GQ, Considine stated that Martin told him that "Your Viserys is better than my Viserys". The diversity of the characters was mostly met with praise, with Jeff Yang of The New York Times stating that diversification of the cast can help the series gain a more diverse audience. The series was included on multiple critics' top ten lists of 2022, including Chicago Tribune, San Francisco Chronicle, CNN, and Polygon.

The show's first season received criticism for the depiction of violence, pacing and cinematography. Reviewing the early episodes, Rolling Stone and Entertainment Weekly said the series leaned too much on grand imagery and lacked the breakout supporting characters that Game of Thrones had. Before the premiere, Martin stated that the series is similar to a Shakespearean tragedy with each character being morally grey with no "character everybody's going to love". The Guardian stated the "dullness" of the characters makes the series more of a period drama than an action-adventure fantasy. The Los Angeles Times and The New York Times cited the constant actor changes as a reason for the lack of emotional attachment to characters. The graphic violence in the season premiere with a failed caesarean section was criticized for being excessive, and according to USA Today, "exploitive and in poor taste". The time jumps throughout the first season were also noted for being jarring and causing confusion, while Martin defended them as being "handled very well". In addition, the dark cinematography in episode seven was a point of criticism from both critics and fans. HBO responded that the dimmed lighting in those scenes was an "intentional creative decision". Game of Thrones faced similar criticism regarding the lighting of scenes in its eighth season, with one of the show's cinematographers stating it was a "deliberate choice". In an interview with The Hollywood Reporter before the second season premiere, Ryan Condal said that the lighting for the upcoming season would be changed after listening to the feedback from the previous season.

=== Viewership ===
The day after the series premiere, HBO said the episode had been viewed by an estimated 9.99 million viewers in the U.S. on its first night of availability – including linear viewers and streams on HBO Max – which it said was the largest single-day viewership for a series debut in the service's history, dethroning Euphoria. After one week of availability, the viewership rose to nearly 25 million in the U.S. across all platforms. Nielsen estimated that the episode was watched by 10.6 million viewers on HBO Max in the first four days, with the number increasing to 14.5 million when including the viewership on the main HBO channel. (Note: Nielsen measures linear viewership in number of viewers while streaming shows are measured in number of minutes.) Samba TV meanwhile stated that 4.8 million U.S. households streamed the episode in the first four days. The series was also popular on social media, with the show premiere being the number one trending topic on Twitter and Google Trends.

The finale of the first season was watched by 9.3 million viewers across all platforms during its premiere night according to HBO, which was the highest viewership for any finale of a HBO show since the series finale of Game of Thrones. The show averaged 9–9.5 million viewers for an episode on premiere night and 29 million total viewers after a week of release.

Nielsen stated in November 2022 that 35% of the viewers of the show were in the age range of 18–34. Similar to Game of Thrones, the first season of House of the Dragon was extensively pirated. According to TorrentFreak, it was the most pirated series of 2022, ahead of The Lord of the Rings: The Rings of Power and other series.

=== Accolades ===
House of the Dragon received nine Primetime Emmy Awards nominations in 2023, including Outstanding Drama Series, winning one for Outstanding Fantasy/Sci-Fi Costumes. In 2023, the season won the Golden Globe Award Best Television Series – Drama, while Emma D'Arcy earned a Best Actress in a Television Series – Drama nomination.
