= King of the Narrow Sea =

- House of the Dragon episode
- Rhaenyra and Alicent reconcile
- Episode no.: Season 1 Episode 4
- Directed by: Clare Kilner
- Written by: Ira Parker
- Cinematography by: Alejandro Martinez
- Editing by: Crispin Green
- Original air date: September 11, 2022
- Running time: 63 minutes

Episode chronology
← Previous "Second of His Name"	Next → "We Light the Way"
- House of the Dragon season 1

"King of the Narrow Sea" is the fourth episode of the first season of the fantasy drama television series House of the Dragon, a prequel to Game of Thrones. The episode was written by Ira Parker and directed by Clare Kilner. It first aired on HBO and HBO Max on September 11, 2022.

The plot follows Rhaenyra's return from her tour of choosing a consort, Daemon's return from Stepstones, the growing bonding between the two aforementioned characters, and the revocation of Otto Hightower as King Viserys' Hand.

In the United States, the episode achieved a viewership of 1.8 million during its premiere night on linear television alone. It received mostly positive reviews from critics, with praise going towards Parker's screenplay, Kilner's direction, and performances of the cast, especially those of Paddy Considine, Matt Smith, and Milly Alcock.

== Plot ==
On a realm-wide tour to choose a spouse, Princess Rhaenyra Targaryen, accompanied by Ser Criston Cole, has travelled to Storm's End. With Lord Boremund Baratheon's guidance, she meets and rejects countless suitors. Rhaenyra abandons the tour when a quarrel between two suitors ends in a fatal duel. As her ship approaches King's Landing, her uncle, Prince Daemon, flies past on his dragon, Caraxes, victoriously returning from his three-year military campaign in the Stepstones.

Daemon enters the throne room, wearing a crown of bone and teeth to announce his new title as "King of the Narrow Sea". He surrenders the crown to his brother, King Viserys, swearing his allegiance. As the reconciled brothers celebrate at a feast, Queen Alicent confides her loneliness to Rhaenyra, who also admits missing their friendship. Daemon speaks to Rhaenyra, advising her to indulge her desires while fulfilling royal duties.

Late at night, Rhaenyra disguises herself as a page and sneaks out with Daemon to explore King's Landing's seamier areas. They drink, attend a bawdy play, and visit a brothel, where Daemon removes Rhaenyra's disguise and seduces her. Although she is willing, he is unable to bring himself to consummate the affair. Frustrated, Daemon abandons Rhaenyra inside the brothel. Returning to the Red Keep, Rhaenyra seduces Criston. Criston, initially reluctant due to his Kingsguard vow of chastity, ultimately gives in and the two have sex.

Ser Otto Hightower learns about Daemon and Rhaenyra's exploits from a spy called the White Worm. Otto passes the information on to Viserys, who reacts angrily to the news, as well as Otto's apparent spying on Rhaenyra. Alicent overhears their conversation. She confronts Rhaenyra privately, inadvertently revealing to Rhaenyra her father's machinations. Rhaenyra denies having sex with Daemon. Viserys angrily confronts a disheveled and hungover Daemon, who seemingly confirms the accusations and proposes to wed Rhaenyra. Enraged, Viserys accuses Daemon of only wanting his crown and exiles him to the Vale. Alicent expresses her belief to Viserys that Rhaenyra is still a virgin.

To avoid scandal, Viserys orders Rhaenyra to marry Ser Laenor Velaryon. In exchange, she demands her father dismiss Otto as his Hand for spying on her, pointing out that he should not rely on the advice of a man who puts his own ambitions above his duty to the king. Viserys then dismisses Otto as his Hand and later sends Grand Maester Mellos to give Rhaenyra an abortifacient drink to prevent any "unwanted consequences."

== Production ==
=== Writing and filming ===
"King of the Narrow Sea" was written by Ira Parker and directed by Clare Kilner, marking their first time in the Game of Thrones franchise.

The title of the episode refers to the title held by Daemon Targaryen.

=== Casting ===
The episode stars Paddy Considine as King Viserys I Targaryen, Matt Smith as Prince Daemon Targaryen, Rhys Ifans as Ser Otto Hightower, Fabien Frankel as Ser Criston Cole, Sonoya Mizuno as Mysaria, Milly Alcock as Young Princess Rhaenyra Targaryen, Emily Carey as Young Queen Alicent Hightower, Graham McTavish as Ser Harrold Westerling, and Jefferson Hall as Ser Tyland Lannister.

== Reception ==
=== Ratings ===
An estimated 1.81 million viewers watched "King of the Narrow Sea" during its first broadcast on HBO on September 11, 2022. The four broadcasts of the episode on HBO during the premiere night attracted a total of 2.47 million viewers. Viewership for the show across all platforms in the US was 5% higher than the previous episode.

=== Critical response ===
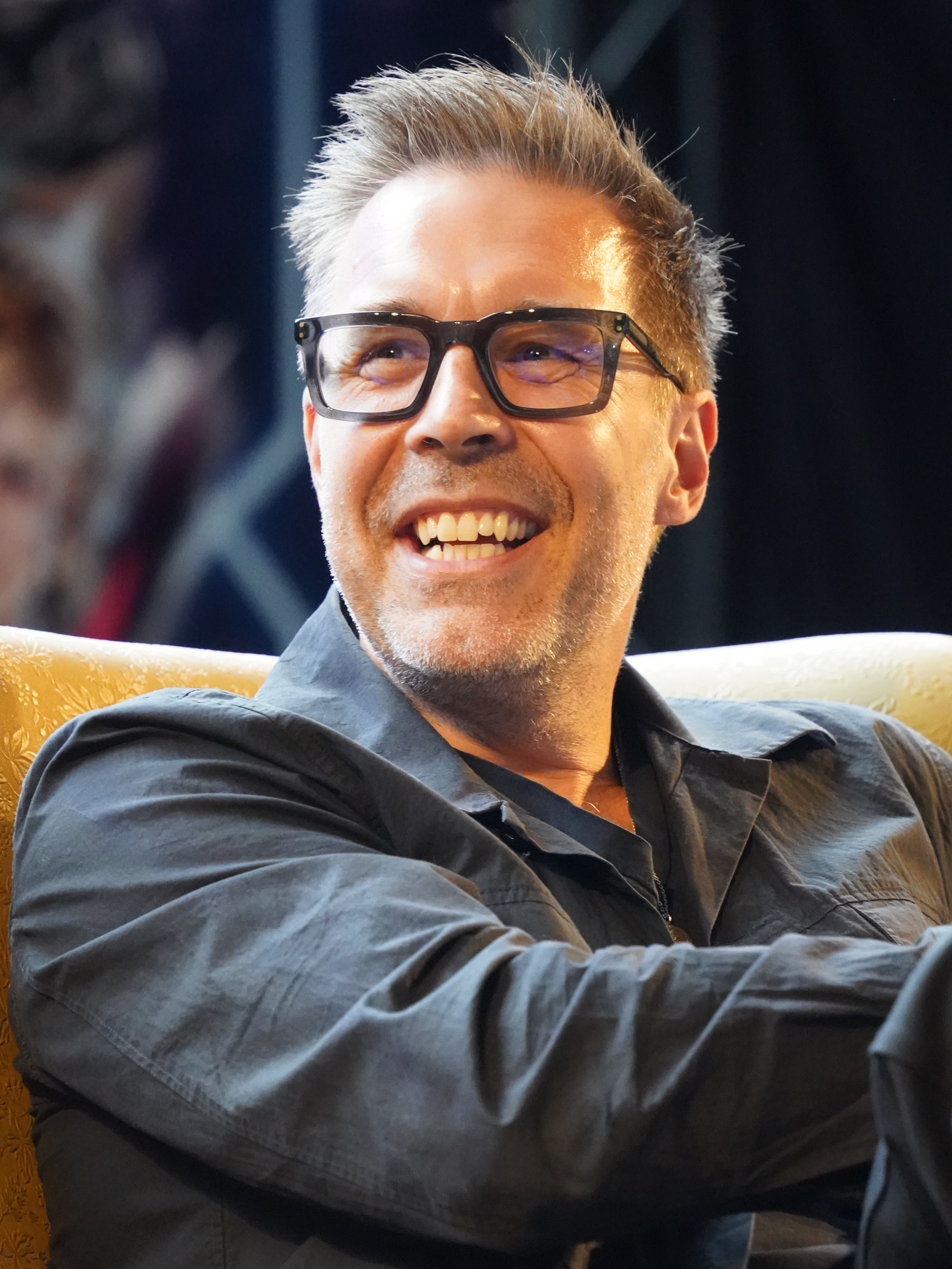
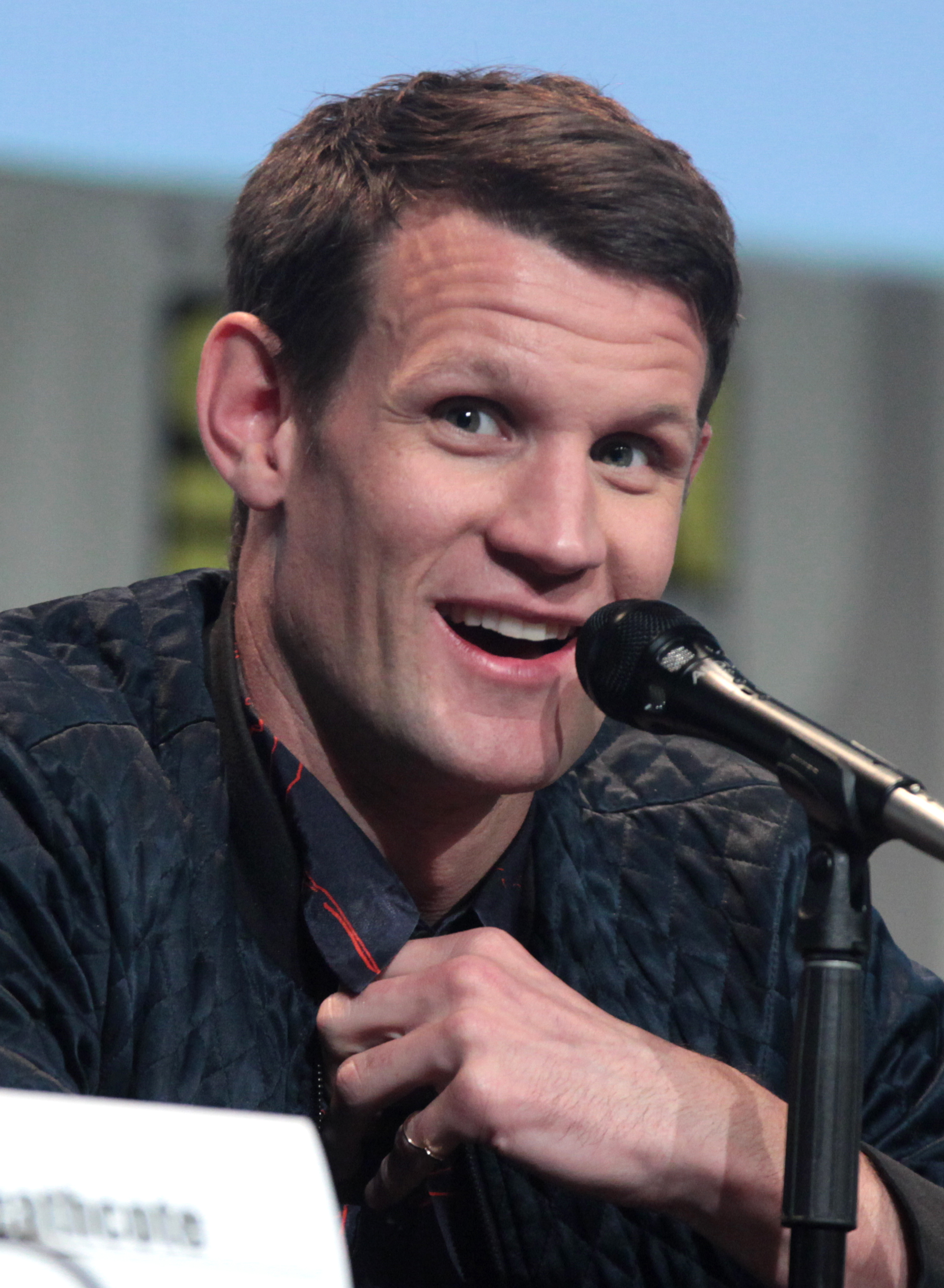
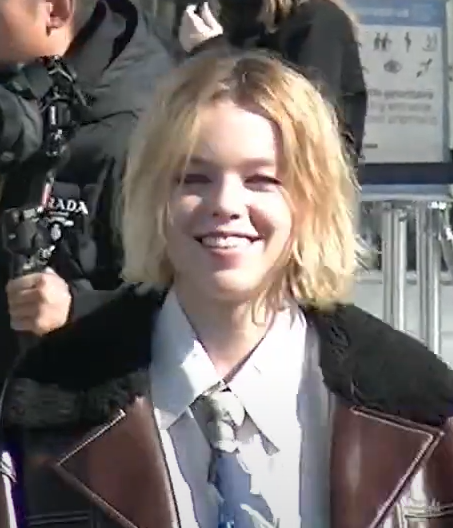
The performances of Paddy Considine, Matt Smith, and Milly Alcock in the episode received critical acclaim.

The episode received mostly positive critical reviews. On the review aggregator Rotten Tomatoes, it holds an approval rating of 87% based on 116 reviews, with an average rating of 7.6/10. The site's critical consensus said, "Making for deeply uncomfortable family viewing, 'King of the Narrow Sea' trades dragonflame for dangerous liaisons and goes a long way towards deepening House of the Dragon's web of intrigue."

Writing for GamesRadar+, Molly Edwards gave it a rating of 4.5 out of 5 stars and said, "After the dazzling, gruesome spectacle of last week, 'King of the Narrow Sea' is a return to what this series does so well: twisty game playing with shrouded motivations. The episode deftly leaves every single member of the main cast in an impossible situation by the time the credits roll." Den of Geek's Alec Bojalad rated it 4 out of 5 stars and wrote, "The show's approach to time remains a double-edged Valyrian sword. House of the Dragon does so many of the little things well that you wish it had more time to indulge them." The Telegraph's Michael Deacon also rated it 4 out of 5 stars and named it "the best episode of the series so far."

Jenna Scherer of The A.V. Club graded it with a "B+" and gave praise to Parker's writing, Kilner's directing, Djawadi's score, and the performances of Smith and Alcock. Furthermore, for Parker and Kilner, Scherer stated that the two have successfully created "a narrative and emotional drive that House Of The Dragon has been sorely lacking. It's tense, sexy, smart, and even, dare I say it, fun." IGN's Helen O'Hara gave it a "good" 7 out of 10 and wrote in her verdict: "This quieter, almost action-free episode is once again focused on dynastic matters and sexposition after the action of last week. It’s well played, shot, and paced, but its unhappy, self-involved characters need a little leavening if they’re going to match the heights of Game Of Thrones." She also praised the writing, production values, and performances, particularly Considine's. Jeremy Egner of The New York Times was also favorable of the episode, praising the on-screen dynamic performances of Considine and Alcock.
