= Second of His Name =

- House of the Dragon episode
- Episode no.: Season 1 Episode 3
- Directed by: Greg Yaitanes
- Written by: Gabe Fonseca; Ryan Condal
- Cinematography by: Pepe Avila del Pino
- Editing by: Tim Porter
- Original air date: September 4, 2022
- Running time: 63 minutes

Episode chronology
← Previous "The Rogue Prince"	Next → "King of the Narrow Sea"
- House of the Dragon season 1

"Second of His Name" is the third episode of the first season of the fantasy drama television series House of the Dragon, a prequel to Game of Thrones. The episode was written by series co-creator Ryan Condal and Gabe Fonseca, and directed by Greg Yaitanes. It first aired on HBO and HBO Max on September 4, 2022.

The plot follows the second birthday celebration of Viserys and Alicent's firstborn son, Prince Aegon Targaryen; as well as Daemon and Corlys battling the Triarchy warriors at Stepstones, which led to the death of Craghas Drahar.

"Second of His Name" introduced several new cast members, including Matthew Needham as Larys Strong and Jefferson Hall as both Jason and Tyland Lannister. In the United States, the episode garnered a viewership of 1.7 million during its premiere night on linear television alone. It received mostly positive reviews from critics, with praise going towards the production values, the battle sequences at Stepstones, chemistry between Rhaenyra and Criston, and performances (particularly that of Matt Smith), though some criticized the writing and pacing.

== Plot ==
Three years on, the war in the Stepstones is going badly for Daemon and the Velaryons. The enemy leader, Craghas "The Crabfeeder" Drahar, and his corsairs have engaged in guerilla tactics, raiding Lord Corlys Velaryon's fleets under the cover of night and retreating into deep caves whenever Prince Daemon launches attacks on his dragon. Viserys is asked to send aid but refuses to support his brother, arguing that Daemon must not be rewarded for his hubris.

Meanwhile, Alicent Hightower, having married King Viserys and given birth to his son, Aegon, is pregnant again; Queen Alicent and Princess Rhaenyra, once close friends, have become estranged. Viserys, disinterested in the Stepstones war, leads the court on a hunt to celebrate Aegon's second nameday; he intends to kill a white hart stag, considered a royal good omen. Believing Viserys intends to replace her with Aegon as heir to the throne, Rhaenyra storms away from camp, with only her Kingsguard, Ser Criston Cole, following.

Viserys dismisses Lord Jason Lannister's marriage suit for Rhaenyra, while Hand of the King Ser Otto Hightower proposes betrothing Rhaenyra to Prince Aegon, her two-year-old half-brother and Otto's grandson. Master of Laws Lord Lyonel Strong advises Viserys to wed Rhaenyra to Corlys Velaryon's son, Ser Laenor, to heal the rift between Houses Targaryen and Velaryon.

While camped overnight in the woods, a wild boar attacks the campsite, trampling Criston and attacking Rhaenyra before the two manage to kill it. Before returning to the main camp, Rhaenyra encounters the white hart and allows it to go unharmed; meanwhile, a weary and depressed Viserys settles for killing an ordinary hart held down by his guards.

Following the hunt, Otto tells Alicent that the realm's nobles will favor Aegon as king, despite Viserys preferring Rhaenyra. Meanwhile, Viserys assures Rhaenyra she will never be replaced as his heir but urges her to find an influential husband to bolster her claim to the Iron Throne.

Alicent advises Viserys to send reinforcements to the Stepstones. When a messenger brings word of Viserys's decision, Daemon beats him down in anger. He feigns surrender to lure the Crabfeeder's army into the open and is quickly wounded and surrounded, at which point the Velaryon infantry, led by Corlys, and his younger brother, Vaemond, launch a counterattack. Simultaneously, Laenor cuts off the enemy's escape route with his dragon, Seasmoke. Daemon pursues Drahar into the caverns, killing him as the Velaryon forces claim victory.

== Production ==
=== Writing ===
"Second of His Name" was written by showrunner and executive producer Ryan Condal and writer Gabe Fonseca, marking Condal's third writing credit and Fonseca's first.

The title of the episode refers to King Viserys' firstborn son with Queen Alicent, Prince Aegon Targaryen, who shares the name with the first Targaryen ruler, Aegon the Conqueror, who established the family dynasty.

=== Filming ===
The episode was directed by Greg Yaitanes, making it his second directorial credit for the series, following the previous episode "The Rogue Prince". The hunt sequences were shot at Caesar's Camp, Rushmoor and Waverley near Aldershot, Hampshire.

=== Casting ===
The episode stars Paddy Considine as King Viserys I Targaryen, Matt Smith as Prince Daemon Targaryen, Rhys Ifans as Ser Otto Hightower, Steve Toussaint as Lord Corlys Velaryon, Fabien Frankel as Ser Criston Cole, Milly Alcock as Young Princess Rhaenyra Targaryen, Emily Carey as Young Queen Alicent Hightower, Graham McTavish as Ser Harrold Westerling, Matthew Needham as Larys "Clubfoot" Strong, and Jefferson Hall as twin brothers Lord Jason and Ser Tyland Lannister. It marks the first appearance of Hall and Needham. Also introduced in the episode are Ryan Corr as Ser Harwin "Breakbones" Strong and Wil Johnson as Ser Vaemond Velaryon.

== Reception ==
=== Ratings ===
An estimated 1.75 million viewers watched "Second of His Name" during its first broadcast on HBO on September 4, 2022. The viewership for the four broadcasts on HBO during the premiere night was 2.54 million, a decrease of around one million or 28.6% compared to the previous episode. During the first three days of release, the episode was watched by more than 16 million U.S. viewers on all platforms, based on data from the Nielsen Corporation and HBO.

=== Critical response ===
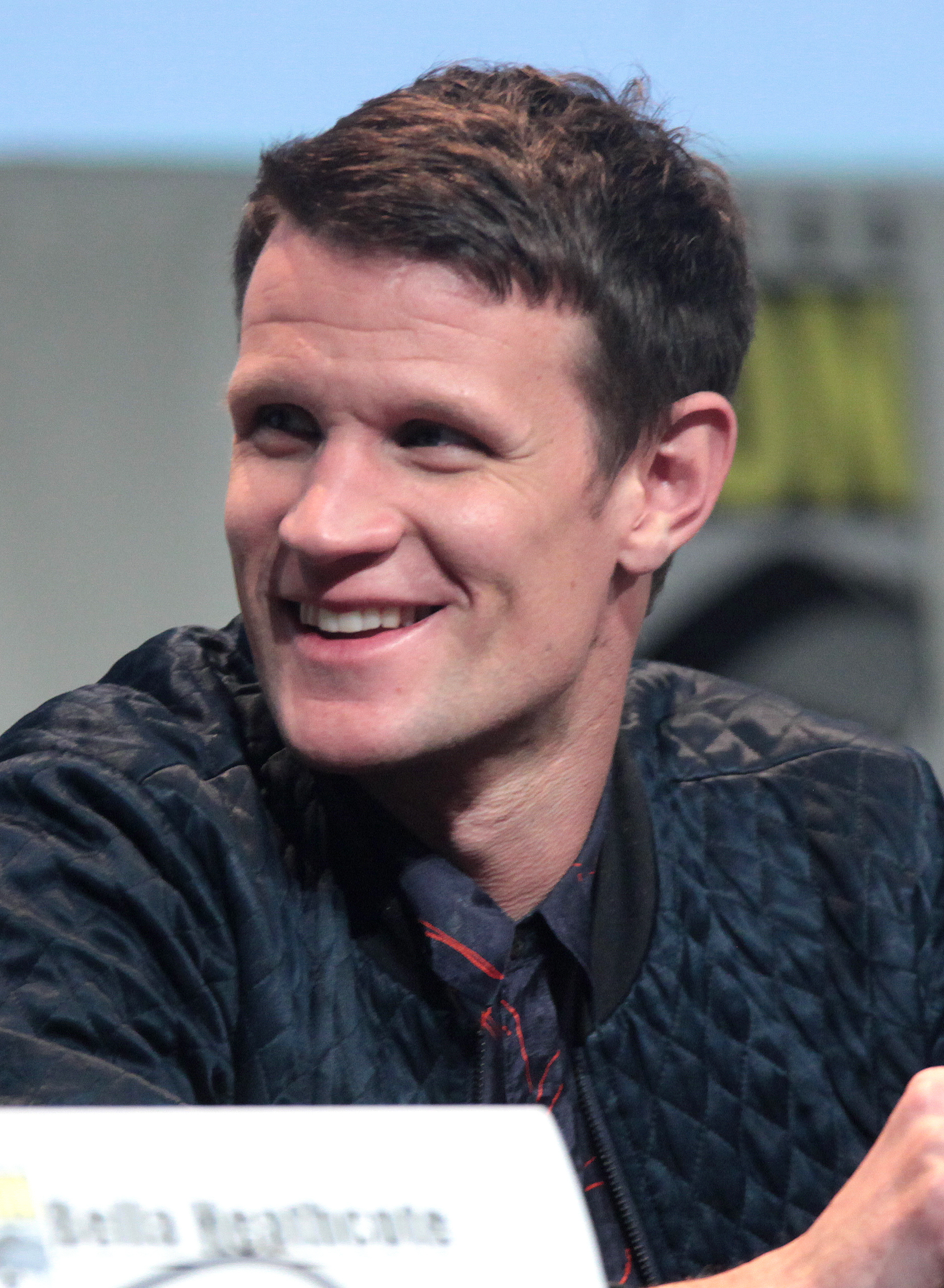
Matt Smith received critical acclaim for his performance in the episode.

The episode received mostly positive reviews from critics. On the review aggregator Rotten Tomatoes, it holds an approval rating of 83% based on 112 reviews, with an average rating of 7.3/10. The site's critical consensus said, "After viewers acclimate to the jarring time-skip, 'Second of His Name' quickly finds its stride with a focus on infernal politicking, rousing spectacle, and some rather nasty crabs."

Writing for Den of Geek, Alec Bojalad rated the episode four out of five stars and said, "In many ways, 'Second of His Name' provides the most compelling evidence yet that the show knows what it's doing. [...] [It] is almost purely an original creation of the show's writers as none of its most climactic moments can be found on any page from a distinct point of view." He also praised its writing, production design, and costumes, as well as the scene between Rhaenyra and Ser Criston Cole. Nick Hilton of The Independent also rated it four out of five stars. IGN's Helen O'Hara gave it a "good" 7 out of 10 and wrote in her verdict: "This episode is a slow burn that introduces new characters and indulges in gossip before unleashing that huge, fiery finale. [...] While it's all starting to feel a bit familiar, this episode still manages to keep our attention – and sneak in some good dragon action." Molly Edwards of GamesRadar+ gave it a four out of five stars and summarized it with "another rock-solid entry in House of the Dragon's first season, shuffling the pieces into place for more epic battles to come" and further praised the performances of Smith and Carey. Kimberly Roots of TVLine also praised Carey's performance.

In a mixed review, Michael Deacon of The Telegraph rated it three out of five stars. He criticized the show for continuing to be a "slow-burner" and expressed his disappointment for killing off the Crabfeeder way too soon, although he praised the battle scene at Stepstones and called it "spectacular". Vulture's Hillary Kelly also gave it a rating of three out of five and criticized some parts of the writing, however she praised the opening and the battle scene, as well as Smith's performance. Jenna Scherer of The A.V. Club graded the episode with a "C+" and wrote, "the episode is centered around the world's most anticlimactic stag hunt, an absurdly lavish affair on the edge of the Kingswood in celebration of Aegon's birthday," while praising Alcock's performance, Rhaenyra's chemistry with Ser Criston Cole, and also the battle scene.
