= The Rogue Prince (House of the Dragon) =

- House of the Dragon episode
- Daemon Targaryen faces Otto Hightower in a standoff at Dragonstone
- Episode no.: Season 1 Episode 2
- Directed by: Greg Yaitanes
- Written by: Ryan Condal
- Cinematography by: Pepe Avila del Pino
- Editing by: Tim Porter; Selina MacArthur
- Original air date: August 28, 2022
- Running time: 54 minutes

Episode chronology
← Previous "The Heirs of the Dragon"	Next → "Second of His Name"
- House of the Dragon season 1

"The Rogue Prince" is the second episode of the first season of the fantasy drama television series House of the Dragon, a prequel to Game of Thrones. The episode was written by series co-creator Ryan Condal and directed by Greg Yaitanes. It first aired on HBO and HBO Max on August 28, 2022. The title of the episode is named after George R. R. Martin's eponymous 2014 novelette.

In the United States, the episode gained a viewership of 10.2 million during its premiere night, surpassing the series premiere and making it the most-viewed episode of the series to date, while on linear television alone, the episode was watched by 2.2 million viewers. It received mostly positive reviews, with critics praising its production design, the performances of Milly Alcock and Matt Smith, and the confrontation between Daemon and Rhaenyra at Dragonstone.

== Plot ==
Prince-Admiral Craghas Drahar of the Triarchy, an alliance of the Free Cities of Essos, attacks Westerosi ships in the Stepstones regions with his pirate fleet. He is known as the Crabfeeder because he nails his enemies to posts on the beach, leaving them to be slowly eaten alive by crabs.

Six months have passed since Rhaenyra's anointing as heir to the Iron Throne. Master of Ships Lord Corlys Velaryon demands that the Small Council take action after the Triarchy-backed pirates destroy four Westerosi vessels. Viserys refuses, wanting to avoid open warfare with Essos. He dismisses Rhaenyra's suggestion to show force against Drahar, and instead relegates her to choosing a new Kingsguard knight. Over protests from Otto and newly appointed Lord Commander Ser Harrold Westerling, she chooses Ser Criston, the only candidate with actual battle experience.

Lady Alicent continues to secretly console Viserys. She eventually advises that he speak with Rhaenyra about Queen Aemma's death and the expectation for a king to remarry. Corlys and Rhaenys suggest that Viserys unite their Houses by marrying their twelve-year-old daughter, Lady Laena.

The Small Council learns Daemon, who previously seized Dragonstone, stole the dragon egg that was intended for the late Prince Baelon and has declared his intentions to marry his mistress, Mysaria, who he claims is pregnant, as his second wife. Otto persuades Viserys to allow him to confront Daemon.

Illegally occupying Dragonstone, Daemon is supported by a loyal cadre of City Watch guards. Otto and a small detachment arrive to confront Daemon, demanding he return the dragon egg. As bloodshed looms, Rhaenyra arrives on her dragon, Syrax, and persuades Daemon to return the egg.

Rhaenyra's disobedience in going to Dragonstone angers the king, prompting a heartfelt discussion regarding his remarrying to fortify the Targaryen line of succession. Ultimately, Viserys announces his intention to wed Alicent, shocking and angering both Rhaenyra and Corlys.

Insulted by Viserys rejecting his daughter's hand in marriage, Corlys secretly meets with Daemon, and proposes they form an alliance to retake the Stepstones, using the victory to their mutual advantage.

== Production ==
=== Writing ===
"The Rogue Prince" was written by showrunner and executive producer Ryan Condal, who also wrote the pilot episode.

The title of the episode is named after George R. R. Martin's 2014 novelette of the same name.

=== Filming ===
The episode was directed by Greg Yaitanes, marking his first time in the Game of Thrones franchise.

=== Casting ===
The episode stars Paddy Considine as King Viserys I Targaryen, Matt Smith as Prince Daemon Targaryen, Rhys Ifans as Ser Otto Hightower, Steve Toussaint as Lord Corlys Velaryon, Eve Best as Princess Rhaenys Targaryen, Sonoya Mizuno as Mysaria, Fabien Frankel as Ser Criston Cole, Milly Alcock as Young Princess Rhaenyra Targaryen, Emily Carey as Young Alicent Hightower, and Graham McTavish as Ser Harrold Westerling.

== Reception ==
=== Ratings ===
"The Rogue Prince" was watched by 10.2 million U.S. viewers on all platforms when it premiered, based on data from the Nielsen Corporation and HBO. With an increase in viewership of 2%, it was a rare feat for an episode succeeding the premiere. To date, it remains the most-viewed episode of the series.

On HBO alone, an estimated 2.26 million viewers watched the episode during its first broadcast. The viewership for four broadcasts during the premiere night was 3.5 million, an increase of 9.4% from the previous episode.

=== Critical response ===
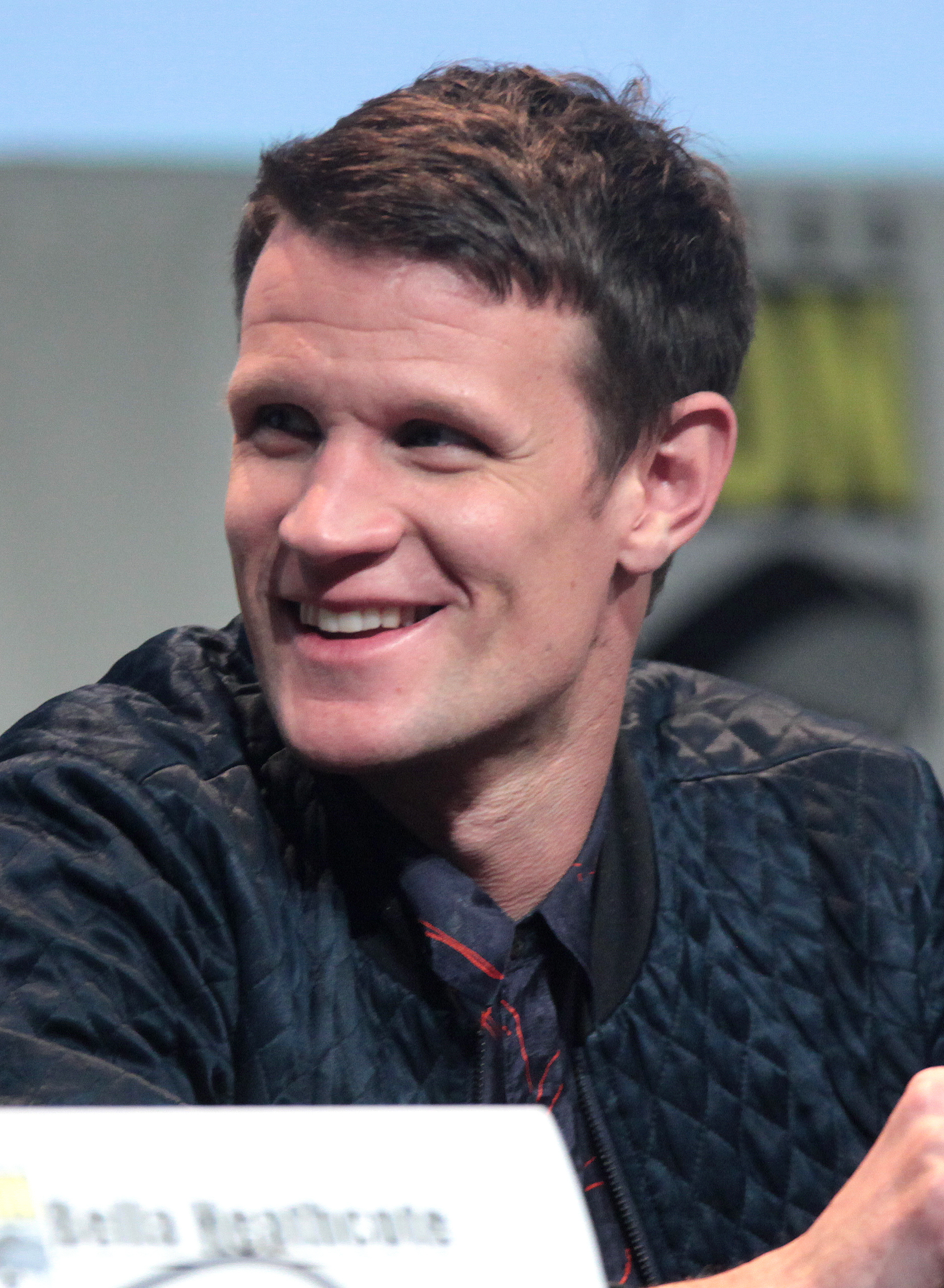
Matt Smith's performance was met with highly positive reviews.

The episode received mostly positive reviews. On the review aggregator Rotten Tomatoes, it holds an approval rating of 85% based on 122 reviews, with an average rating of 7.4/10. The site's critical consensus said, "Stolen dragon eggs and awkward matchmaking add up to an installment that is designed to lay foundations rather than dazzle in its own right, but 'The Rogue Prince' succeeds in nesting juicy conflicts."

Helen O'Hara of IGN gave the episode a rating of 8 out of 10 and said, "House Of The Dragon's holds its strong momentum in its second week. This episode mostly moves pieces into new, more dangerous places – but some of those pieces are dragons so who cares?" She also highlighted the confrontation at Dragonstone between Daemon and Rhaenyra as "the best moment of the series so far" and praised Condal's writing and Ifans' performance. Writing for Rolling Stone, Sean T. Collins summarized the episode with: "Striking imagery, compelling intrigue, humane performances: Put it all together and you've got some damn fine fantasy television. And with a new queen on the way and war on the horizon, we have a feeling things are about to get wild in Westeros once again." He also praised the performances, particularly Considine's and Alcock's.

In a mixed review, Alec Bojalad of Den of Geek rated it two and a half out of five stars. He deemed it as a "talky" episode that is weaker than the premiere episode and said, "an awkward hour of television that doesn't fully extinguish the show's hopes of being a worthy heir to the Iron Throne." However, he praised its production value, visuals, the confrontation between Rhaenyra and Daemon, and the final scene between Corlys and Daemon. Grading the episode with a "C+," Jenna Scherer of The A.V. Club stated the episode was "talky" and made up of "85-percent courtly machinations" while praising the confrontation between Daemon and Rhaenyra, writing that the show "desperately needs more scenes" like it as the show's focus on conversations and palace intrigue were becoming "boring." Vulture's Hillary Kelly gave it a rating of three out of five and called it, "heavy on exposition and light on fornication," and also praised the confrontation at Dragonstone, saying, "there is finally some delicious, vicious tension in the air."

A subsequent article by Inverse reacted to King Viserys undergoing maggot therapy on his badly infected fingers. In the article Dr. Yamni Nigam, professor of health care science at Swansea University, pointed out that maggot therapy has not only been a real-life practice for millennia but has seen a large scale revival in the past 40 years, FDA approved to treat chronic ulcers and other conditions. Dr. Nigam expressed her concern, however, that viewers would become disgusted by its use in this episode, when it has in truth saved many patients' limbs from amputation.
