= The Heirs of the Dragon =

- House of the Dragon episode
- Rhaenyra Targaryen is proclaimed by Viserys I Targaryen as his legal heir
- Episode no.: Season 1 Episode 1
- Directed by: Miguel Sapochnik
- Written by: Ryan Condal
- Cinematography by: Fabian Wagner
- Editing by: Tim Porter
- Original air date: August 21, 2022
- Running time: 66 minutes

Episode chronology
← Previous —	Next → "The Rogue Prince"
- House of the Dragon season 1

"The Heirs of the Dragon" is the series premiere and first episode of the first season of the fantasy drama television series House of the Dragon, an adaptation of the second half of George R. R. Martin's book Fire & Blood and a prequel to Game of Thrones. The episode was written by series co-creator Ryan Condal and directed by co-showrunner and executive producer Miguel Sapochnik. It first aired on HBO and HBO Max on August 21, 2022.

As the first episode of the series, it introduces the setting and the main characters of the show. The episode centers on the debate over King Viserys Targaryen's heir to the Iron Throne, specifically between his brother Daemon and his first-born daughter Rhaenyra, following the stillbirth of his first-born son.

In the United States, the episode achieved a viewership of nearly 10 million during its premiere night, making it the biggest series premiere for HBO, with 2.1 million viewers on linear television alone. It garnered mostly positive reviews from critics, with praise for Sapochnik's direction, the jousting scene, cast, and performances (particularly that of Matt Smith). It received two Emmy Award nominations for Outstanding Fantasy/Sci-Fi Costumes and Outstanding Production Design for a One Hour Period/Fantasy Series, winning the former.

== Plot ==
In 101 AC, (Note: In this world, the calendar system is based on the conquest of Westeros by Aegon I Targaryen, with AC meaning "After the Conquest.") King Jaehaerys I Targaryen, having outlived his sons, convened a Great Council to select an heir and avoid a potential war of succession. Though 14 claims are heard only two candidates are truly considered: Princess Rhaenys Targaryen, the king's eldest descendant, and Prince Viserys Targaryen, the king's eldest male descendant. The lords of the Seven Kingdoms ultimately choose Viserys.

Nine years into Viserys's reign, (Note: A card of on-screen text appears after the cold open, stating that it is now nine years into Viserys's reign, and specifically 172 years before the birth of Daenerys Targaryen (thus about 188 years before Game of Thrones Season 1)) his wife, Queen Aemma Arryn, is again pregnant. After many failed pregnancies, Viserys is certain Aemma will birth a healthy son. A great tournament is organized to celebrate the impending birth. Ser Otto Hightower, the Hand of the King, insists that Prince Daemon, Viserys's brother and heir presumptive, is unfit to rule, citing his brutal methods as Commander of the City Watch, but Viserys ignores his advice.

At the tournament, Viserys's only living child, Princess Rhaenyra, and her companion, Lady Alicent Hightower, Otto's daughter, are intrigued by Ser Criston Cole, a handsome, common-born knight who defeats the popular Daemon in both jousting and melee. Meanwhile, Aemma suffers a breech birth that drastically risks both her life and her baby's. Viserys allows Grand Maester Mellos to perform a cesarean section, hoping to save the child, though knowing the procedure will kill Aemma. The infant, named Baelon, dies shortly after his mother. Rhaenyra's dragon, Syrax, cremates their remains during the funeral.

At Otto's request, Alicent makes a condolence visit to Viserys. Otto later informs the Small Council that, at a local brothel, Daemon mockingly referred to the deceased Baelon as "the heir for a day." When confronted, Daemon says Viserys never supported him and claims he is a weak king manipulated by others, particularly Otto. Outraged, Viserys removes Daemon as his heir in favor of Rhaenyra and banishes Daemon from King's Landing ordering him to return to Runestone and his estranged lady wife, Rhea Royce.

Viserys tells Rhaenyra a secret passed down through the generations: their ancestor Aegon the Conqueror dreamt of a threat from the North that Westeros can only defeat if a Targaryen sits on the Iron Throne. The lords of Westeros swear fealty to Rhaenyra as crown princess, while Daemon and his lover, Mysaria, depart atop his dragon, Caraxes.

== Production ==
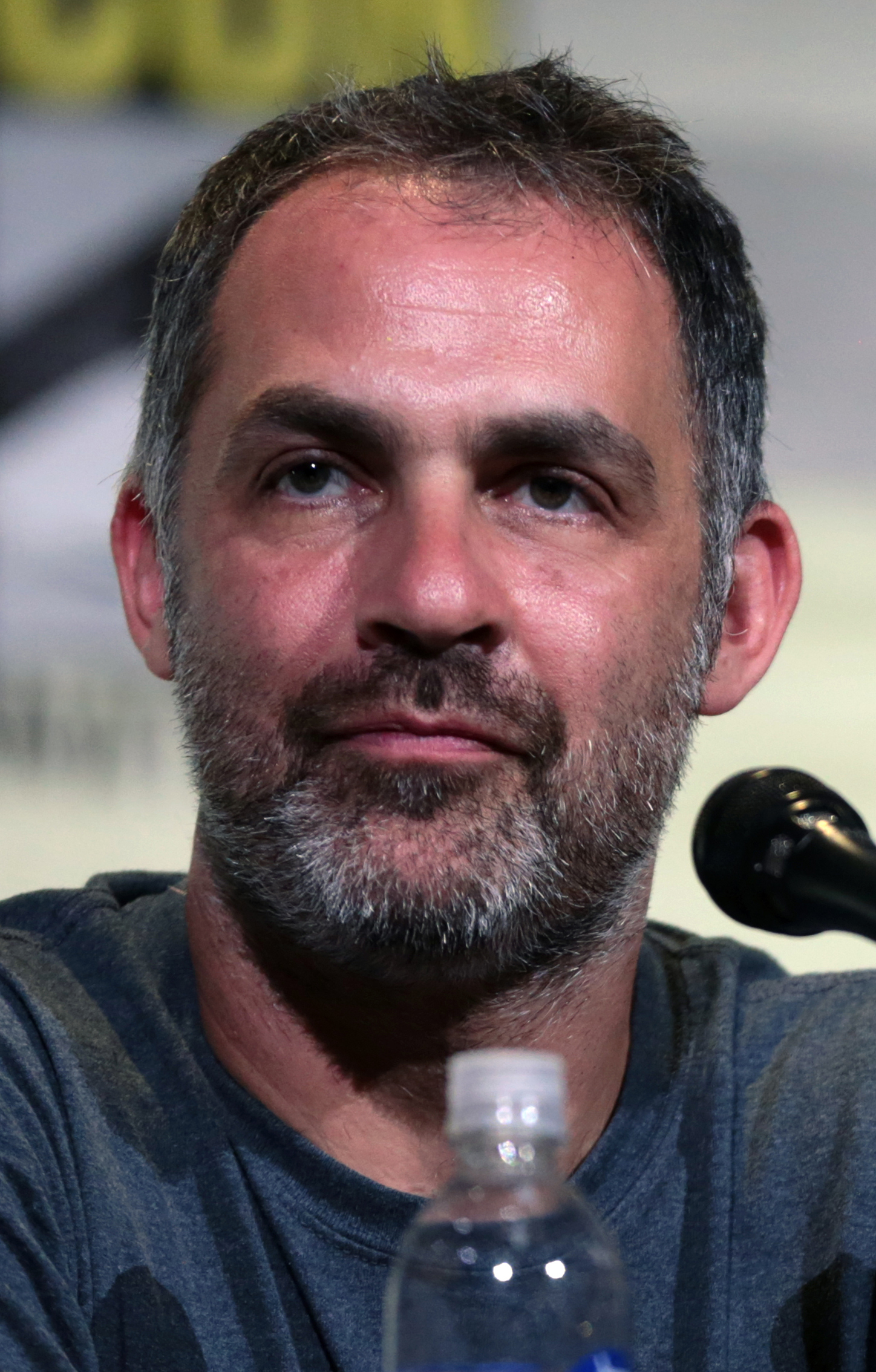
Miguel Sapochnik made his return as director.

=== Writing and filming ===
"The Heirs of the Dragon" was directed and written by showrunners and executive producers Miguel Sapochnik and Ryan Condal, respectively. It marks Sapochnik's return to the Game of Thrones franchise and his seventh directorial credit in the franchise. He previously directed the Game of Thrones episodes "The Gift", "Hardhome", "Battle of the Bastards", "The Winds of Winter", "The Long Night", and "The Bells".

=== Casting ===
The series' starring cast members include Paddy Considine as King Viserys I Targaryen, Matt Smith as Prince Daemon Targaryen, Emma D'Arcy as Adult Princess Rhaenyra Targaryen, Rhys Ifans as Ser Otto Hightower, Steve Toussaint as Lord Corlys Velaryon, Eve Best as Princess Rhaenys Targaryen, Fabien Frankel as Ser Criston Cole, Milly Alcock as Young Princess Rhaenyra Targaryen, Emily Carey as Young Alicent Hightower, Sonoya Mizuno as Mysaria, and Graham McTavish as Ser Harrold Westerling. D'Arcy was credited for narrating the episode's opening scene, but they did not make an on-screen appearance.

Considine's casting was announced on October 5, 2020. In the same year, the casting of Smith and D'Arcy were announced on December 11. In 2021, Ifans, Toussaint, Best, and Mizuno were announced to have joined the cast on February 11, followed by Frankel on April 15, and Alcock and Carey on July 6.

== Reception ==
=== Ratings ===
"The Heirs of the Dragon" had 9.99 million viewers, which made it the biggest series premiere for HBO. The size of the audience caused HBO Max in the US and Crave in Canada to crash for some users. Downdetector reported 3700 instances of the application not responding. HBO said the viewership represented the largest single-day viewership for a series debut in HBO Max's history.

On August 26, it was mentioned by HBO that the viewership number has risen to 20 million across the United States. After one week of availability, the viewership rose to nearly 25 million in the U.S. across all platforms.

According to Nielsen, the episode had a viewership of 327 million minutes or an estimated 5.03 million viewers on HBO Max in the U.S. during its first day. (Note: Nielsen measures linear viewership in number of viewers while streaming shows are measured in number of minutes. According to Nielsen, the episode had a viewership of 327 million minutes or an estimated 5.03 million viewers on HBO Max in the U.S. during its first day. It later estimated that the episode was watched by 10.6 million viewers on HBO Max in the first four days, with the number increasing to 14.5 million when including the viewership on the main HBO channel. Samba TV meanwhile stated that 4.8 million U.S. households streamed the episode in the first four days.) It later estimated that the episode was watched by 10.6 million viewers on HBO Max in the first four days, with the number increasing to 14.5 million when including the viewership on the main HBO channel. Samba TV meanwhile stated that 4.8 million U.S. households streamed the episode in the first four days.

On HBO alone, an estimated 2.17 million viewers watched the premiere episode during its first broadcast. For the four broadcasts of the episode during premiere night, the viewership was 3.2 million. In the United Kingdom, the episode was watched by 1.39 million on Sky Atlantic and became the biggest drama launch ever on Sky.

=== Critical reception ===
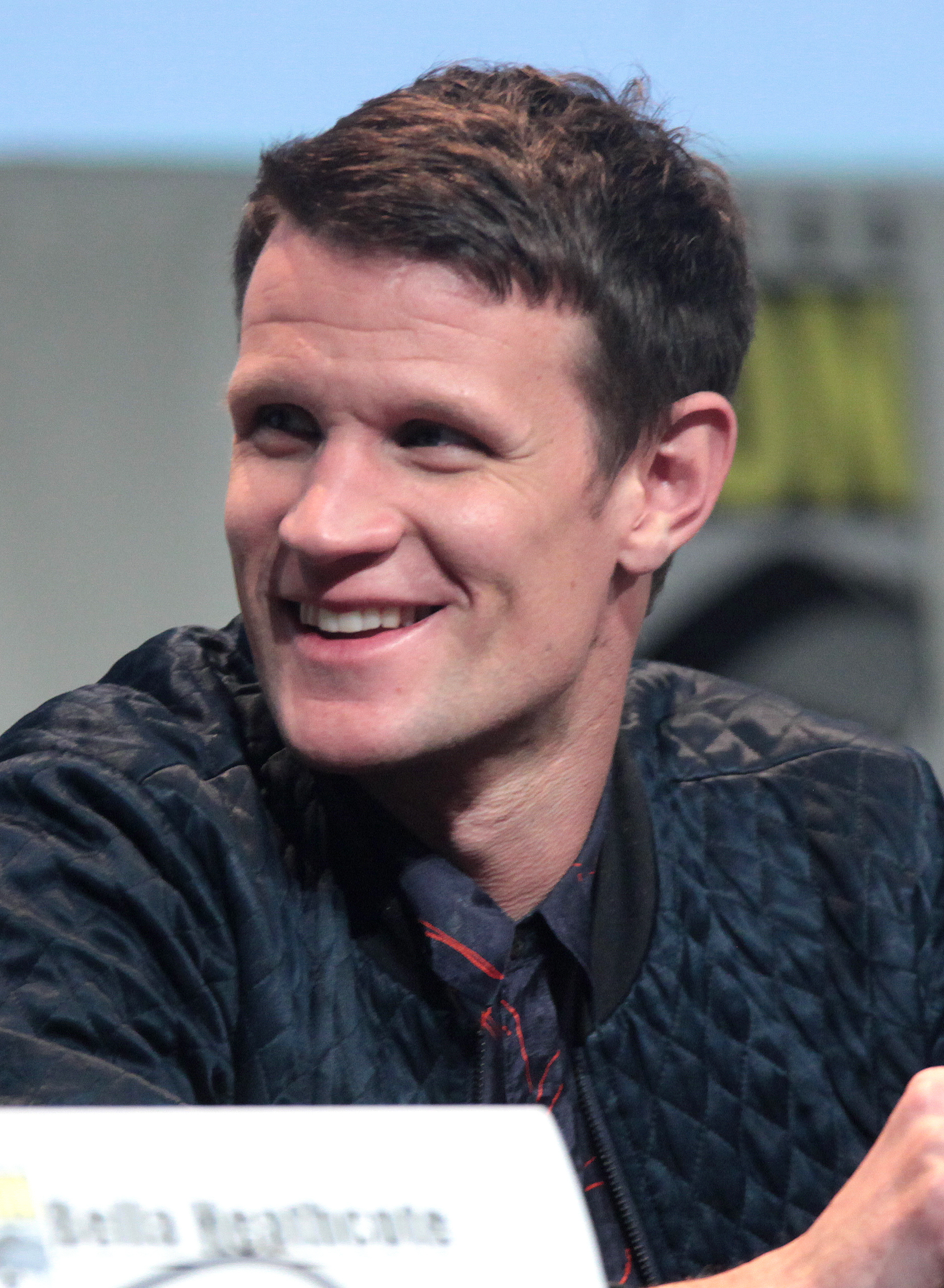
Matt Smith received critical acclaim for his performance in the episode.

The episode received mostly positive critical reviews. On the review aggregator Rotten Tomatoes, it holds an approval rating of 85% based on 157 reviews, with an average rating of 7.6/10. The site's critical consensus said, "Bearing the weight of a hallowed TV lineage, 'The Heirs of the Dragon' won't fully fire viewers up for another Game of Thrones, but solidly sets the board with plenty of blood."

Writing for IGN, Helen O'Hara gave the premiere episode a rating of 8 out of 10 and said, "House of the Dragon's premiere marks a strong, well-cast start to the Game of Thrones spin-off. This feels very close to its predecessor in tone and content, but immediately establishes a struggle for power around an amiable, weak-willed king, and vivid new characters to fight those battles." Alec Bojalad of Den of Geek gave it a four out of five stars and deemed it as "in many ways better [than 'Winter Is Coming'] as it's a far more focused experience," and further praised the acting (particularly Smith's) and the jousting scenes. Rebecca Nicholson of The Guardian, in her review for the first six episodes, called the first episode "spectacular" and that "it rattles through everything that made its predecessor, Game of Thrones, such a titan of the small screen." Grading the episode with a "B", Jenna Scherer of The A.V. Club described it as "If this first episode is anything to go on, House of the Dragon will be a more staid affair than Game of Thrones, for better or worse." However, she criticized the production design, particularly "the outfits, technology and jargon", for being "identical to the ones in Game of Thrones" despite taking place two centuries earlier.

=== Accolades ===
Year	Award	Category	Nominee	Result	Ref.
2023	Art Directors Guild Awards	Excellence in Production Design for a One-Hour Fantasy Single-Camera Series	Jim Clay	Nominated	
2023	British Society of Cinematographers Awards	Best Cinematography in a Television Drama	Fabian Wagner	Nominated	
2023	Costume Designers Guild Awards	Excellence in Sci-Fi/Fantasy Television	Jany Temime	Won	
2023	Primetime Emmy Awards	Outstanding Fantasy/Sci-Fi Costumes	Jany Temime, Katherine Burchill, Paul Yeowell, Rachel George, and Joanna Lynch	Won	
2023	Primetime Emmy Awards	Outstanding Production Design for a Narrative Period or Fantasy Program (One Hour or More)	Jim Clay, Dominic Masters, and Claire Nia Richards	Nominated	
