= Fabian Wagner =

German cinematographer

- Born: 25 April 1978 (age 48); Munich, West Germany
- Education: Northern Film School (Master's degree)
- Years active: 2004–present

Fabian Wagner (born 25 April 1978) is a German cinematographer.

== Early life ==
Wagner was born in Munich, West Germany.

He studied at the Northern Film School in Leeds, earning a master's degree.

== Career ==
Wagner began first shooting music videos and short films. In 2008, he began working regularly on television shows for BBC and ITV, and since then has been working almost exclusively for British and American film companies. His first role as a cinematographer for a TV show was for the 2008 BBC Three drama series Spooks: Code 9, for which he filmed all six episodes.

He has also been nominated for ASC and BSC awards and has become one of the youngest members of the British Society of Cinematographers.

In 2017, Wagner became involved with the DC live-action adaptation of the Justice League, directed by Zack Snyder. The production was notoriously plagued with complications, most notably with the change of directors. During post-production, Snyder stepped down from the project following the death of his daughter. Joss Whedon was then brought in to, not only complete the shooting, but also to redo the film entirely. Wagner wasn't involved on the reshoots conducted by Whedon, with Jean-Philippe Gossart taking over the role. Despite only 10% of his material being used in the theatrical cut, Wagner received sole credit for the film.

In 2020, after Warner Bros. decided to greenlit the director's cut, Snyder and Wagner were brought back to finish the film. Aside from recovering the existing and unused footage, they also shot additional material that hasn't been conceptualized before. The "Snyder Cut" (as referred by the media) was released on HBO Max in 2021.

== Filmography ==
=== Film ===
Year	Title	Director	Notes
2015	The Legend of Barney Thomson	Robert Carlyle	
2015	Victor Frankenstein	Paul McGuigan	
2017	Justice League	Zack Snyder	
2018	Overlord	Julius Avery	Shared credit with Laurie Rose
2021	Zack Snyder's Justice League	Zack Snyder	
2024	Venom: The Last Dance	Kelly Marcel	
2026	Masters of the Universe	Travis Knight	
2027	This Is How It Goes †	Idris Elba	Post-production
2027	A Minecraft Movie Squared †	Jared Hess	Post-production

=== Television ===
Year	Title	Director	Notes
2008–2010	Spooks: Code 9	Toby Haynes; Brendan Maher; Mat Whitecross; Michael Caton-Jones	All 6 episodes
2009	Ashes to Ashes	Ben Bolt	2 episodes
2009	The Street	David Blair	Episodes "The Hero" and "Past Life"
2009	The Fixer	Sarah O'Gorman	2 episodes
2009–2011	Hustle	James Strong; Luke Watson; Colin Teague	6 episodes
2010	Survivors	David Evans	2 episodes
2010–2012	Accused	David Blair; Ashley Pearce	6 episodes
2011	Scott & Bailey	Sarah Pia Anderson; Syd Macartney	4 episodes
2011	DCI Banks	Paul Whittington	Episode "Playing with Fire" (Part 1 and 2)
2012	Sherlock	Paul McGuigan; Toby Haynes	3 episodes
2012	Sinbad	Colin Teague	3 episodes
2012	Mrs Biggs	Paul Whittington	Miniseries
2013	The White Queen	Colin Teague	4 episodes
2013	Lucky 7	Paul McGuigan	Episode "Pilot"
2013–2014	Da Vinci's Demons	Jamie Payne; Paul Wilmshurst; Charles Sturridge	5 episodes
2014–2019	Game of Thrones	Alik Sakharov; Miguel Sapochnik	8 episodes
2016	The Family	Paul McGuigan	Episode "Pilot"
2019	The Crown	Sam Donovan	Episodes "Dangling Man" and "Imbroglio"
2022	House of the Dragon	Miguel Sapochnik	Episodes "The Heirs of the Dragon", "The Princess and the Queen" and "Driftmark"

TV movies

Year	Title	Director
2010	Pulse	James Hawes
2011	Frankenstein's Wedding... Live in Leeds	Colin Teague
2015	Make Your Face Funny for Money: The Mechanics	Sarah O'Gorman
2015	Make Your Face Funny for Money... With Make-Up	Sarah O'Gorman
2015	Churchill's Secret	Charles Sturridge

== Awards and nominations ==
American Society of Cinematographers

Year	Category	Title	Episode	Result	Ref.
2015	Best Cinematography in Regular Series	Game of Thrones	"Mockingbird"	Nominated	
2016	Best Cinematography in Regular Series	Game of Thrones	"Hardhome"	Nominated	
2017	Best Cinematography in Regular Series	Game of Thrones	"Battle of the Bastards"	Won	
2021	Outstanding Achievement in Cinematography in an Episode of a One-Hour Television Series – Non-Commercial	The Crown	"Imbroglio"	Won	

British Society of Cinematographers

Year	Category	Title	Episode	Result	Ref.
2015	Best Cinematography in a Television Drama	Game of Thrones	"Hardhome"	Nominated	
2016	Best Cinematography in a Television Drama	Game of Thrones	"The Winds of Winter"	Nominated	
2022	Best Cinematography in a Television Drama	House of the Dragon	"The Heirs of the Dragon"	Nominated	

AACTA Awards

Year	Category	Title	Episode	Result	Ref.
2014	Best Cinematography in Television	Mrs Biggs	"Episode 3"	Nominated	

Creative Arts Emmy Awards

Year	Category	Title	Episode	Result	Ref.
2012	Outstanding Cinematography for a Miniseries or Movie	Sherlock	"A Scandal in Belgravia"	Nominated	
2015	Outstanding Cinematography for a Miniseries or Movie	Game of Thrones	"Hardhome"	Nominated	

OFTA Television Awards

Year	Category	Title	Result
2012	Best Cinematography in a Non-Series	Sherlock	Won
2014	Best Cinematography in a Series	Game of Thrones	Won

Toronto After Dark Film Festival

Year	Category	Title	Result
2018	Best Cinematography	Overlord	Won
