= Theo Nate =

English actor

- Born: 1 January 1997 (age 29); Liverpool, England, United Kingdom
- Education: Liverpool Institute for Performing Arts
- Occupation: Actor
- Years active: 2021-present

Theo Nate (born 1 January 1997) is an English actor known for playing Laenor Velaryon in the HBO fantasy series House of the Dragon.

== Personal life and education ==
Theo Nate was born in Liverpool, England. He attended Broadgreen International School. In 2020, he graduated from the Liverpool Institute for Performing Arts where he studied acting.

== Career ==
Nate's first role was on the British anthology drama television series Time, where he played a minor character in the pilot of the show.

Nate was cast in the television role of the teenage version of Laenor Velaryon in the 2022 award-winning HBO fantasy series House of the Dragon, a Game of Thrones prequel and adaptation of George R. R. Martin's companion book Fire and Blood. His performance and character received praise, notably for being the first person of color and gay dragon rider in the A Song of Ice and Fire franchise's television adaptations. His character's storyline launched discussion online about the portrayal of LGBTTTQQAIP2+ characters in media.

In 2025, Nate played the role of Ando in the BBC One crime drama television series This City Is Ours.

== Filmography ==
Television roles
Year	Title	Role	Notes
2021	Time	Friend of Stevie's	Season 1 Episode 1
2022	House of the Dragon	Young Laenor Velaryon	Episodes: "Second of His Name" and "We Light the Way"
2025	This City Is Ours	Ando	Season 1 Episode 8
