= Criston Cole =

Biography of a ficitional character

- A Song of Ice and Fire character House of the Dragon character
- Criston Cole as depicted in the third season of House of the Dragon
- First appearance: Literature: The Princess and the Queen (2013); Television: "The Heirs of the Dragon" (2022)
- Last appearance: Television: "Faceless Men" (2026)
- Created by: George R. R. Martin
- Adapted by: Ryan Condal and George R. R. Martin (for House of the Dragon)
- Portrayed by: Fabien Frankel

In-universe information
- Alias: The Kingmaker
- Gender: Male
- Titles: Ser; Lord Commander of the Kingsguard; Hand of the King
- Affiliation: The Greens

Criston Cole is a fictional character from George R.R. Martin's A Song of Ice and Fire series of epic fantasy novels, appearing in the 2013 novella The Princess and the Queen, the 2014 novella The Rogue Prince and the 2018 novel Fire & Blood. In the HBO television adaptation House of the Dragon, he is portrayed by English actor Fabien Frankel.

In both the books and the show, Cole is a highly skilled knight who ascends to become a member of King Viserys I Targaryen's Kingsguard, initially acting as Rhaenyra Targaryen's sworn protector. He later rises to become Lord Commander of the Kingsguard and Hand of the King to King Aegon II Targaryen, fighting for the Green faction during the Targaryen civil war known as the Dance of the Dragons. Cole acts as one of the Greens' primary military commanders, leading campaigns throughout the Crownlands and Riverlands to ensure Aegon's continued reign.

Since his introduction in the television series, Cole has proven to be one of House of the Dragon's most polarising characters. Though Frankel's performance received consistent acclaim, critical reception to the character's writing has been more mixed, whilst fans regularly cite him as one of the show's most hated characters.

== In the books ==
=== Fire and Blood ===
Criston was born in 82 AC to the son of Lord Dondarrion's steward. In 104 AC, during the tournament at Maidenpool to celebrate King Viserys I Targaryen's ascension to the Iron Throne, he won Princess Rhaenyra Targaryen's favour after beating Prince Daemon Targaryen during the melee by knocking his sword Dark Sister out of his hands with a morningstar. He later wore the princess' favour during the joust, where he again bested Daemon, as well as Ser Erryk and Arryk Cargyll of the Kingsguard. A year later, he was sworn in as a member of the Kingsguard, replacing Ser Ryam Redwyne, and was named Rhaenyra's sworn shield.

In 113 AC, following the betrothal of Rhaenyra to Ser Laenor Velaryon, Criston reportedly confessed his love to Rhaenyra, offering to run away to the Free Cities with her, but she refused. However, an alternate source suggested that it was Rhaenyra who attempted to seduce him but was refused. Regardless, Criston went from being Rhaenyra's strongest supporter to her most hated enemy, and was replaced by Ser Harwin "Breakbones" Strong as her sworn protector.

In 114 AC, Criston fought in the joust at Rhaenyra's wedding to Laenor , during which he injured Harwin and Ser Joffrey Lonmouth, the latter of whom died from his injuries six days later. Though many were angered at Criston's actions, Queen Alicent Hightower chose him to be her sworn protector.

Following the death of King Viserys in 129 AC, Queen Alicent assembled the small council - Criston among them - to discuss the succession. Criston objected to the ascension of Rhaenyra, Viserys' chosen heir, on account of her children with Laenor Velaryon being supposed bastards, instead supporting her brother Aegon as the correct choice for the crown. During the meeting, Lord Lyman Beesbury, the only councillor to support Rhaenyra, declared that this was treason, leading to Criston slitting his throat with a dagger or throwing him out of a window to his death (depending on which source is to be believed). Criston then helped imprison the remaining Black supporters at court and personally crown Aegon as king in the Dragonpit. As a result of his support of Aegon II and his hand in crowning him, Criston would be forever remembered in Westeros' history as 'The Kingmaker'.

Following Aegon II's coronation, the Dance of the Dragons officially began when Rhaenyra refused to support her half-brother's ascension. Many lords remembered King Viserys' wish for Rhaenyra to succeed him, and threw their support behind her. As the blacks started to gain more allies, Aegon II became frustrated at the slow progress of his grandfather and Hand of the King, Ser Otto Hightower, resulting in him stripping Otto of his office and appointing Criston as his new hand.

In response to the death of Aegon's eldest son, Prince Jaehaerys Targaryen, at the hands of Blood and Cheese, Criston ordered Ser Arryk Cargyll to sneak into Dragonstone disguised as his twin brother Ser Erryk, who was guarding Rhaenyra on Dragonstone. The scheme ended up failing when the twins came encountered and killed one another in single combat.

Criston then began a military campaign throughout the crownlands, subduing any houses loyal to Rhaenyra, including Houses Rosby, Stokeworth and Darklyn, forcing them to join his army. He then launched an attack on the castle of Rook's Rest, the seat of House Staunton, in an attempt to bait Rhaenyra into sending a dragonrider to meet him, wherein he would ambush them using King Aegon II Targaryen on Sunfyre and Prince Aemond Targaryen on Vhagar. Princess Rhaenys Targaryen then arrived on her dragon Meleys, leading to the Battle at Rook's Rest, in which Rhaenys and Meleys were killed and Aegon and Sunfyre were badly crippled. Aemond was later appointed Prince Regent following Aegon's injuries, but kept Criston as Hand.

Following Rook's Rest, Aemond and Criston plotted to retake Harrenhal from Prince Daemon, who had gathered an army of rivermen to the castle in support of Rhaenyra. Criston then marched his army of four thousand greens to Harrenhal, only to find it abandoned when they arrived, as Daemon had emptied the castle and flown away on Caraxes to aid Rhaenyra in the fall of King's Landing. Criston attempted to convince an enraged Aemond to retreat south to join with the host of greens led by Lord Ormund Hightower and Prince Daeron Targaryen, but Aemond refused, abandoning Criston's forces to wreck havoc upon the Riverlands with Vhagar as revenge for Daemon's trickery.

Criston attempted to march his remaining forces south to meet the Hightower host, but was met by strong resistance from the Riverlords allied to the blacks, who used ambush tactics and guerrilla warfare to wear down his army. This culminated when Criston's surviving host was trapped by an army of thousands of blacks, led by Ser Garibald Grey, Ser Pate of Longleaf, and Lord Roderick Dustin. Criston offered to surrender if the blacks would spare the lives of his men, but was refused, and so challenged all three of his foes to a duel. He was then killed when Pate ordered Red Robb Rivers and his archers to shoot Criston with three arrows, saying "I'll have no songs about how brave you died, Kingmaker. There's tens o' thousands dead on your account". Following his death, Criston's remaining men were wiped out by the rivermen and Winter Wolves, a massacre later known as 'The Butcher's Ball'. Criston's head was then mounted on a spear and carried to the First Battle of Tumbleton.

=== A Song of Ice and Fire ===
In the main A Song of Ice and Fire novels, Criston is mentioned as having embodied the best and worst aspects of the Kingsguard. In A Feast for Crows, Ser Arys Oakhart recalls a rumour that Criston had been Rhaenyra's lover prior to joining the Kingsguard, whilst Jaime Lannister tells Loras Tyrell that not all Kingsguard can be so easily classified as heroic or villainous, naming Criston as an example.

== Television adaptation ==
=== Season 1 ===
Criston is first introduced as a competitor in the Heir's Tournament, where he defeats several high-born lords in the joust, including Prince Daemon Targaryen, whom he also bests in single combat. Following his victory, Cole asks for the favor of Princess Rhaenyra Targaryen, who throws her laurel wreath to him and wishes him luck. Six months later, Criston is named to the Kingsguard at Rhaenyra's insistence, as he is the only candidate who has real combat experience. He later travels to Dragonstone as part of a detachment led by Ser Otto Hightower, the Hand of the King, to force Prince Daemon into giving up his occupation of the castle and returning an egg that he stole from the Dragonpit.

Three years later, King Viserys organizes a royal hunt in honor of his son Aegon's second nameday. During the hunt, Rhaenyra flees into the woods on horseback, prompting Criston to chase after her. As they walk back to camp, Rhaenyra expresses frustration at her lack of control over her own life, but Cole reminds her that it was only by her grace that he became a Kingsguard and bestowed such a great honour on his house. He later saves Rhaenyra from a wild boar after they make camp during the night. Some time later, Criston accompanies Rhaenyra on a tour of Westeros to find potential suitors for her hand, though the tour is cut short after a fight breaks out between suitors during an audience at Storm's End. Later that night, Rhaenyra seduces Cole whilst he stands guard in her bedroom, despite some initial reluctance on his part.

After Rhaenyra is betrothed to Lord Corlys Velaryon's son Laenor, Criston, still guilt-ridden over breaking his Kingsguard vow, tries to convince Rhaenyra run away to Essos with him so that they can secretly marry. Rhaenyra refuses, insisting that she must do her duty, but suggests that she and Criston continue their affair in secret. Criston angrily accuses Rhaenyra of using him, distraught at the fact that he believes he has soiled his white cloak for nothing. Criston is then summoned by Queen Alicent Hightower, who questions him about a rumor she heard about Rhaenyra (in reference to her and Daemon), leading Criston to confess his sexual encounter with the princess. During the welcoming feast for Rhaenyra's wedding, Criston is approached by Ser Joffrey Lonmouth, who admits to being Laenor's lover and hints that he knows Criston's secret. This causes Criston to snap, and he furiously beats Joffrey to death in front of the other wedding guests, much to their horror and Laenor's dismay. Criston then walks out to the godswood and prepares to commit suicide, but is interrupted by Alicent.

Ten years later, Criston is now the master-at-arms in King's Landing and a staunch ally of Queen Alicent, encouraging Alicent's sons, Aegon and Aemond, to develop an intense hatred of Rhaenyra's sons Jacaerys and Lucerys. During a training exercise, Harwin Strong interevenes and chastises Cole for his harsh instruction, causing Criston to mock Harwin by alluding to the rumour that he is the father of Rhaenyra's sons. Harwin violently beats Cole in response to his mockery and is forced to leave King's Landing as a result. Following Laena Velaryon's funeral, Criston is among the Kingsguard who separate Rhaenyra and Daemon's children from Aemond following a fight in which Aemond loses his eye. Viserys later berates Cole for failing to prevent the fight. Alicent orders Criston to cut out one of Lucerys' eyes as revenge, but he refuses, reminding her that he is only sworn to her as a protector, not an enforcer. He is then held back by Daemon when Alicent tries to attack Lucerys with a knife.

Six years later, Criston is still master-at-arms and has trained Aemond into becoming a highly competent warrior. Following the death of King Viserys, Criston attends the subsequent Small Council meeting and kills Lord Lyman Beesbury by slamming his face down on the table in an attempt to make him sit down when he protests Prince Aegon's ascension. Criston is then ordered by Lord Commander Harrold Westerling to drop his sword and cloak, but Criston refuses and draws his sword, confirming his loyalty to the Green cause.

Later that day, Criston is secretly ordered by Alicent find Aegon, who has disappeared from the Red Keep, and bring him to her. Criston takes Aemond with him and the two begin their search on the Street of Silk, during which Aemond vents about how he should be king over Aegon. The two later intercept Arryk and Erryk Cargyll, who have found Aegon on Otto's orders, and a fight breaks out, resulting in Aemond and Cole gaining control of the wayward prince. Criston is then appointed Lord Commander of the Kingsguard by Alicent for his loyalty, and he crowns Aegon with the Conqueror's own crown in the Dragonpit, hailing him as the true heir to the Iron Throne. The coronation is interrupted when Rhaenys Targaryen bursts through the floor on her dragon Meleys, who then flies away to warn Rhaenyra of the Greens' betrayal.

=== Season 2 ===
Following Aegon's coronation, Criston has been plotting with Aemond to wage war against Rhaenyra in the Riverlands whilst also having an affair with Alicent. He is later caught having sex with Alicent by Queen Helaena Targaryen after she rushes into the room following the murder of her son Prince Jaehaerys. At the following Small Council meeting, Criston is interrogated by an enraged Aegon II about where he was at the time of Jaehaerys' murder, to which he lies and says he was asleep. Consumed by guilt, Criston commands Ser Arryk Cargyll to infiltrate Dragonstone and slay Rhaenyra as revenge for Jaehaerys' death. However, the plan fails and Arryk is killed as a result. Criston is then appointed Hand of the King by Aegon after he dismisses Ser Otto from the post, insisting that Cole will be his "steel fist" for the wars to come.

During his first council meeting as Hand, both Jasper Wylde and Alicent declare Criston's scheme to with Ser Arryk as foolhardy, but Cole defends himself , saying the Greens cannot afford to wait for war to come to them. Criston points out that controlling Harrenhal is essential to the war effort, proposing that he lead a small force to begin gradually subduing the crownlands houses loyal to Rhaenyra and join them to his cause. Just before leaving for his march, Alicent tells Criston that her elder brother Gwayne Hightower will be joining him, who backhandedly insults Cole for his Dornish heritage and for replacing Otto as Hand. Alicent then offers to pray for Criston's safety and offers her favour in the form of a handkerchief at his request. Later, whilst out in the Crownlands, Criston saves Gwayne and a party of Hightower knights after they are spotted by Baela Targaryen and her dragon Moondancer whilst leaving for a nearby tavern.

Criston, Gwayne and their army continue their campaign throughout the Crownlands, recruiting houses Rosby and Stokeworth to the Green cause and beheading Lord Gunthor Darklyn after he refuses their terms of surrender. Instead of marching on Harrenhal, Cole then turns the army east towards Rook's Rest and insists upon attacking the castle in broad daylight, much to Gwayne's confusion. The army then attacks the castle, which is halted when Princess Rhaenys Targaryen arrives on Meleys and begins incinerating the Green forces. However, this is all revealed to be part of Criston's plan, who launches signal arrows to alert Aemond, who is lying in wait to ambush Rhaenyra's dragonriders with Vhagar. During the battle, Aegon unexpectedly arrives on Sunfyre, which Cole uses to boost his men's morale into continuing the attack as the dragons duel. Aemond then joins the fight on Vhagar and blasts Aegon and Sunfyre out of the sky, causing them to free-fall and crash into the forest. A horrified Criston rides to the impact site but is knocked out en route when Vhagar violently crashes into the battlefield, reawakening to find that Rhaenys and Meleys are dead and that his army has been completely decimated by dragonfire. He then makes his way towards Aegon's crash site, finding the king's motionless body with a severely injured Sunfyre curled around him.

Upon returning to King's Landing, Criston parades Meleys's severed head through the city but is baffled at the muted reaction of the smallfolk, who consider the death of a dragon to be a bad omen. Aegon is revealed to be alive but severely injured and comatose; Criston does not reveal to Alicent that Aemond had a hand in his brother's injuries. At the subsequent small council meeting, Alicent nominates herself as regent, but the council - including a shell-shocked Criston - overrule her and instead elect Aemond. Alicent furiously confronts Criston afterwards and declares him disloyal.

At a later Small Council meeting, Criston protests when Aemond orders him to march on Harrenhal against Daemon, as their losses at Rook's Rest mean they do not have the numbers to defeat him, but is overruled. He then shares a glance with Alicent before leaving the city with Gwayne and his army. On the march to Harrenhal, Gwayne sees Criston with Alicent's handkerchief, accusing him of sleeping with his sister and breaking his Kingsguard vows as a result. However, Criston, having been mentally destroyed following the carnage at Rook's Rest, expresses regret over his past choices and tells Gwayne that he believes they "march toward their annihilation" at the hands of Rhaenyra's dragons, much to Gwayne's horror.

=== Season 3 ===
During their march to Harrenhal, Gwayne confronts Criston about a soldier who he caught sexually assualting a local village girl, insisting that he be punished. However, Cole refuses to directly punish the man himself, nihilistically declaring that war brings out the worst in men and that "doom and ruin" awaits them regardless. He later sees Aemond approaching Harrenhal on Vhagar, spurring his men to march on.

The army reaches Harrenhal days later, finding it abandoned save for Alys Rivers, who insists that Aemond and Vhagar have fled and revealing that Rhaenyra has taken King's Landing from the greens. Gwayne pleads Cole to make for Tumbleton and join with Lord Ormund Hightower's forces, but Cole refuses, instead deciding to wage guerilla warfare against the Riverlords and Winter Wolves in a final stand.

Cole's forces successfully take out multiple Riverland camps, but their progress is stalled by caltrops left by Roderick Dustin and Oscar Tully. Having been forced to put down their horses, Cole leads his remaining soldiers on foot, only to find that the Riverlords have already crossed the river and burned the bridges behind them to prevent Cole from pursuing them. Despondent at their futile progress, Gwayne offers Cole to serve under the Hightowers, but Criston, having grown tired of serving highborn lords, vows to make a final stand against the blacks in the hope that he will die a glorious death. He then gives a speech to his tired men as Gwayne abandons the group to head for Tumbleton.

Cole's dwindling army continues to march until they find a seemingly abandoned Tully camp, which is revealed to be a trap laid by the Riverlords, who ambush them. They fight off their attackers, only to be surrounded on all sides by Oscar, Roderick, the Riverland army and the Winter Wolves, who demand Criston face justice for his treachery against the crown. Cole asks if they will spare his men if he surrenders but Oscar refuses, at which point Cole demands single combat against Oscar and Roderick, wrapping Alicent's handkerchief around his sword hilt as he prepares to make his final stand. This is short lived, however, as Criston is unceremoniously shot three times by Alysanne Blackwood in the chest, breast and face, killing him. As his lifeless body slumps to the ground, still clutching the handkerchief, the Black army rushes Cole's remaining men from all sides and wipes them out.

Following his death, Cole's head is mounted on a spear and carried by Roderick to the First Battle of Tumbleton. When asked by Daemon how Cole died, Roderick replies, "Badly".

== Reception ==
Cole is widely regarded as one of the most divisive characters in House of the Dragon. Some have praised the character's gradual descent into nihilism as complex and multi-faceted, such as William Goodman of GQ, who argued his obsession with absolution and transformation into a man who "found freedom in nihilism" resulted in an "utterly compelling" character arc. Domink Bošnjak from Game Rant similarly highlighted how Cole's "growing disillusionment with the war, and visible exhaustion have made him more human than he appears in a book structured as a collection of unreliable histories", though he criticised the TV series for downplaying the character's martial prowess in comparison to the novel.

However, some have expressed frustration at the character's vindictive and hypocritical nature, particularly towards Rhaenyra, which was frequently compared to that of a modern-day incel. Saloni Gajjar from A.V. Club referred to Cole as a "certified Westerosi incel", arguing that the character's behaviour had led to his death being regarded as "the moment every House Of The Dragon viewer has been waiting and loudly wishing for". Similarly, Jessica Toomer of Collider wrote that Cole seemed "tailor-made for Tumblr fandom", only to reveal himself to be a "bitter, bloodthirsty incel" whose actions had caused fans to launch "memes and Reddit threads and summoning circles dedicated to his on-screen demise". Goodman acknowledged the contradictory nature of the character, noting that he was "smug, pious, hypocritical, or even incel-adjacent", but praised Frankel's performance for bringing "so much depth to the character.

Critics were also divided on Cole's death scene in the episode 'Faceless Men', some feeling that it was far too anticlimactic for such a hated character. Gajjar argued that despite his death being highly anticipated by fans, the third season's uneven pacing caused the scene to feel "watered-down" in comparison to the deaths of other hated Game of Thrones characters such as Joffrey Baratheon, Ramsay Bolton and Petyr Baelish. Josh Rosenberg from Esquire argued that the episode glossed over the impact of Cole's death on the other characters, stating that the show "doesn't even bother to have anyone react to his departure", opining that the sequence would have been better placed at the end of the fifth episode rather than the start of the sixth. Conversely, David Crow from Den of Geek argued that the character's "muted, unsung end" was a fitting end for Cole, as his desire for "an honour and chivalric destiny he never earned or deserved" went ultimately unfulfilled.

Despite the character's mixed reception, Frankel was consistently praised for his performance, particularly during the third season. Commending Frankel's performance during Cole's death, Crow said that "the abject surprise of a final, bitter disappointment [...] in Frankel’s eyes is enough to almost make me pity this pathetic man". TVLine named Frankel "Performer of the Week" for his performance in the episode 'Unbowed and Unbent', writing, "Would we want to follow Ser Criston Cole into battle, especially after the events of this week's "House of the Dragon"? Hell no — the knight seems to have lost his damn mind. But were we captivated by Fabien Frankel's performance as his character made clear his fatalistic intentions? Absolutely."
