= Ryan Condal =

American filmmaker

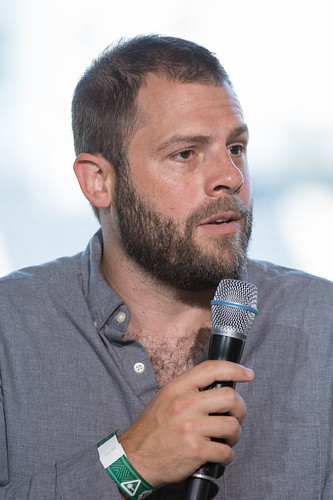
- Condal in 2016
- Born: 1979 or 1980 (age 46–47); Hasbrouck Heights, New Jersey, U.S.
- Education: Villanova University (BAcc)
- Occupations: Executive producer; Screenwriter; Television show creator
- Years active: 2008—present
- Spouse: Caitlin Monahan (m. 2012)

Ryan J. Condal (born 1979 or 1980) is an American television showrunner and writer who co-created the TV series House of the Dragon (2022–present), a prequel to the TV series Game of Thrones (2011–2019), with George R. R. Martin.

In the 2010s, Condal and Carlton Cuse were creators and showrunners for the TV series Colony (2016–2018). Condal was also a screenwriter for the films Hercules (2014) and Rampage (2018).

== Background ==
=== Upbringing and early career efforts ===
Condal was born in 1979 or 1980 in Hasbrouck Heights, New Jersey, in the United States and grew up in Hasbrouck Heights. He graduated from Villanova University in 2001 with a Bachelor of Accountancy degree. After college, he lived on the East Side in Manhattan and worked in the pharmaceutical industry for eight years, first working in marketing then shifting to advertising. While working, he submitted stories to competitions to win fellowships and grants and started placing in competitions. He was able to transfer his job to Los Angeles, where he continued writing. He eventually sold a script titled Galahad to The Film Company in early 2008. The film stalled in development hell, and the script ranked in the Top 15 of The Black List for 2008. He was subsequently hired by Universal Pictures to write an adaptation of the Radical Comics 2008 comic book series Hercules: The Thracian Wars. The studio 20th Century Fox also hired Condal to write a new draft of a screenplay adapting the Oni Press comic book series Queen & Country. By 2010, Condal helped rewrite a screenplay adapting the epic 17th-century English poem Paradise Lost for Legendary Pictures.

By 2012, he was working on a film adaptation of The Art of War by Sun Tzu, also for Legendary, though by late 2013, screenwriter Alex Litvak was hired to write a new approach. Also in 2012, Condal was hired by CBS Films to write an English-language remake of the 2009 Spanish-language film Celda 211. He was also hired to write a film titled Boy Nobody for Sony Pictures.

Condal began collaboration with Carlton Cuse to produce for NBC a television pilot of the comic book series The Sixth Gun. Condal wrote the pilot, and he and Cuse were executive producers of the pilot. The pilot was green-lighted in 2013, and it was filmed in the US state of New Mexico, but NBC did not pick up the series.

=== First credits: Hercules, Colony, and Rampage ===
Condal's first official screenwriting credit, shared with Evan Spiliotopoulos, was for the 2014 film Hercules. Condal had written an initial script for Paramount Pictures, and Spiliotopoulos revised the script. Meanwhile, despite the pilot for The Sixth Gun not becoming a TV series, Condal and Carlton Cuse sought to work together again and co-created the project that would become the TV series Colony (2016–2018). In 2014, USA Network green-lit a television pilot. The pilot for Colony was picked up and ultimately became a TV series co-produced by Legendary Television and Universal Cable Productions. It premiered on USA Network in January 2016. Colony lasted for three seasons, from 2016 to 2018, and was canceled in July 2018 before the third season's finale.

In 2016 before Colony premiered, Condal and Cuse were hired to rewrite the script for the film Rampage produced under New Line Cinema. They rewrote a draft written by Ryan Engle, and Adam Sztykiel wrote the final revisions. Later in 2016, Condal began writing a screenplay for Warner Bros.'s perpetually-in-development remake of the 1976 science fiction film Logan's Run, itself based on a book published in 1967. By early 2018, Condal created and wrote Conan, a potential TV series adapting the character Conan the Barbarian as written by Robert E. Howard, and the series was acquired by Amazon Studios. Condal also submitted a script to Lionsgate that would reboot the Highlander film series, a studio effort that was a decade old. Shortly after Rampage's release in the second quarter of 2018, Lionsgate hired Condal to write a screenplay adapting the Image Comics series Analog.

In late 2022, Condal wrote Neo Earth to be made into a film by Brad Peyton under Netflix. Condal also sold a pitch to Lionsgate to be directed by Chad Stahelski. Condal's involvement with Highlander under Lionsgate also continued, with Stahelski also attached to direct. Stahelski directed the upcoming Highlander based on a script by Michael Finch, with previous drafts by Condal and Kerry Williamson being noted.

=== Creating House of the Dragon ===
With A Song of Ice and Fire author George R. R. Martin, Condal created the HBO TV series House of the Dragon (2022 to present) that is a prequel to the TV series Game of Thrones (2011–2019). Condal, who was familiar with A Song of Ice and Fire, first met Martin at a book convention in 2005. By 2013, when Condal was working on The Sixth Gun, he successfully sought a meeting with Martin, and the two developed a friendship.

When HBO began exploring in 2016 spinoffs to Game of Thrones, Condal unsuccessfully pitched to them a series that adapted Martin's series of novellas Tales of Dunk and Egg. In late 2019, HBO ordered Condal and Martin's House of the Dragon to be produced. Condal served as a showrunner with Miguel Sapochnik and also served as an executive producer with Sapochnik, Martin, and Vince Gerardis. House of the Dragon premiered in August 2022, and by the end of the month, Sapochnik stepped down as showrunner, leaving Condal as the remaining showrunner for House of the Dragon. The series was nominated for a Primetime Emmy Award for Outstanding Drama Series in its 75th ceremony, with Condal among 11 producers recognized.

House of the Dragon was renewed for a second season with Condal as the sole showrunner, and the second season premiered on June 16, 2024. Condal resumed as sole showrunner for the third season.

When HBO decided to adapt Tales of Dunk and Egg to the series A Knight of the Seven Kingdoms (2026), Condal recommended to them Ira Parker, one of the writers of House of the Dragon, to create the series. Condal serves as an executive producer for A Knight of the Seven Kingdoms, which premiered on January 18, 2026.

==== Falling-out with George R. R. Martin ====
In January 2026, Martin described his relationship with Condal as "abysmal" and said his disputes over House of the Dragon involved changes from the source material Fire & Blood that he said affected key plot points. Martin said that, after the first season, he received early drafts, gave notes, and saw some changes made, but that "when we got into season two" Condal "basically stopped listening" to him, and Martin was later told to submit notes through HBO rather than directly to Condal. Sources said Martin and Condal's relationship worsened further during a meeting in which Condal presented his plans for season three, after which HBO asked Martin to step back from the series for a period before he was later brought back. Martin objected to Condal's vision for season three of House of the Dragon and said, "This is not my story any longer". Condal, in response to Martin's comments, pointed to a statement he had given in March 2025, saying he had tried to include Martin in the adaptation process but cited "practical issues" and his obligations to proceed.

== Credits ==
Condal's credits
Year(s)	Title	Medium	Credits	Ref.
2014	Hercules	Film	Screenplay credit with Evan Spiliotopoulos	
2016–2018	Colony	Television	Co-creator with Carlton Cuse, executive producer, writer (36 episodes)	
2018	Rampage	Film	Screenplay credit with Ryan Engle, Carlton Cuse, Adam Sztykiel	
2022–present	House of the Dragon	Television	Co-creator with George R. R. Martin, executive producer, writer (8 episodes)	
2026-present	A Knight of the Seven Kingdoms	Television	Executive producer	
