= Jefferson Hall (actor) =

English actor (born 1977)

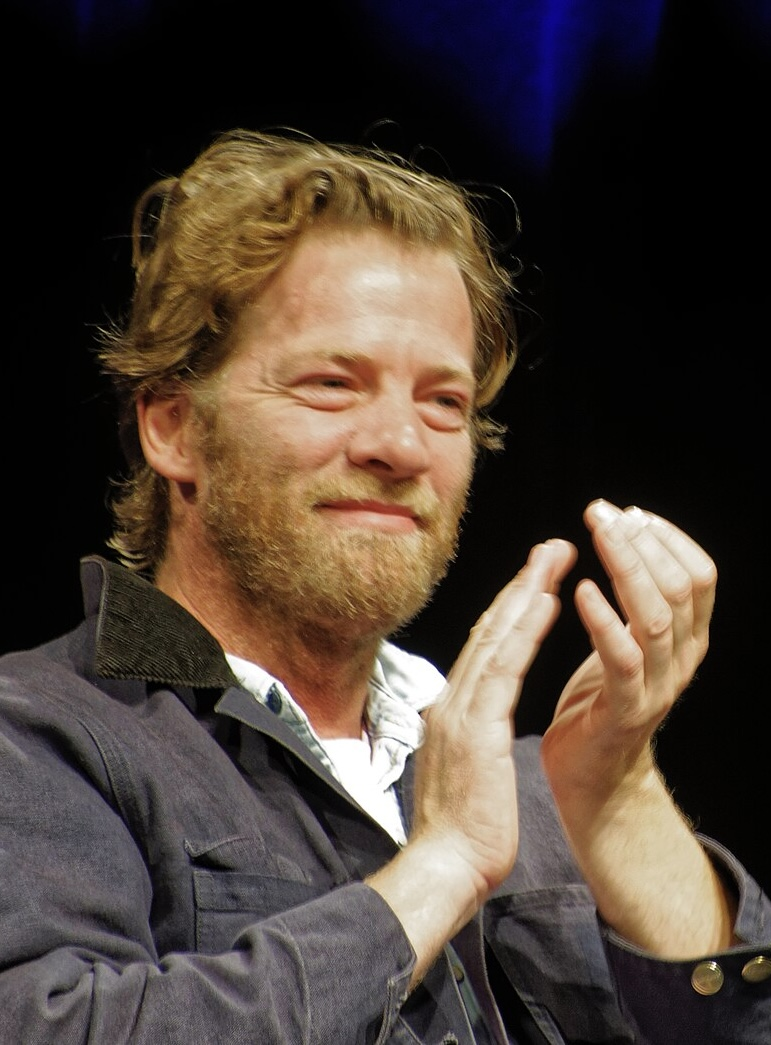
- Hall at the 2022 Comic-Con Germany Stuttgart
- Born: 6 December 1977 (age 48); Coventry, England
- Other name: Robert Hall
- Education: Royal Central School of Speech and Drama (BA)
- Occupation: Actor
- Years active: 2005–present

Jefferson Hall (born 6 December 1977), occasionally credited as Robert Hall in his earlier roles, is an English actor. He is known for the roles of Hugh of the Vale in Game of Thrones (2011), Varg in Wizards vs Aliens on CBBC (2012–2013), Torstein in Vikings (2013–2015), Aaron Korey in Halloween (2018), twins Jason Lannister and Tyland Lannister in House of the Dragon (2022–present), and Haakon Chevalier in Oppenheimer (2023).

== History ==
Hall trained at the Royal Central School of Speech and Drama in London. He has had a varied TV and film career.

He has appeared as Hugh of the Vale in Game of Thrones, as well as playing both the twins Jason Lannister and Tyland Lannister in HBO's House of the Dragon since 2022.

He appeared in Halloween (2018), Tenet (2020), and Oppenheimer (2023).

== Filmography ==
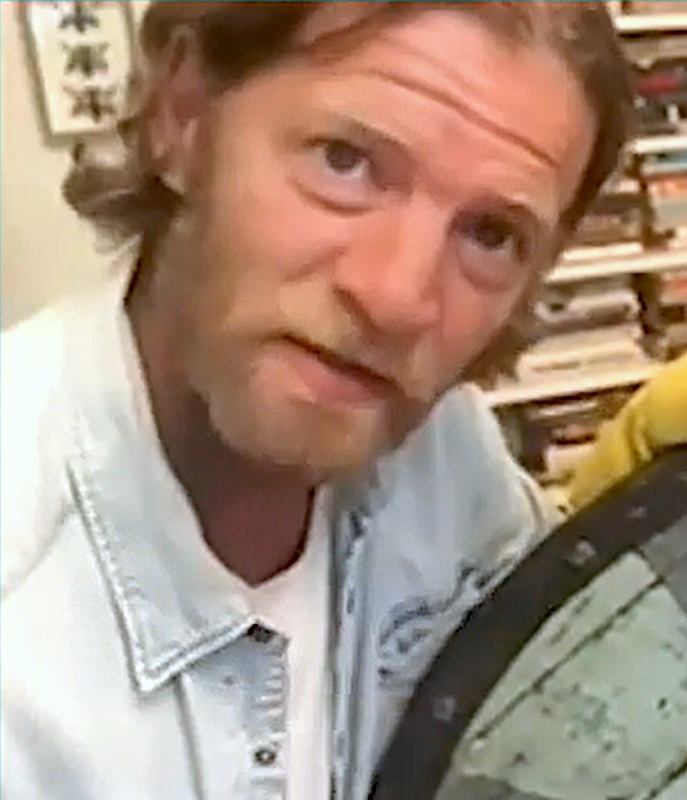
Hall in 2024.

=== Film ===
Year	Title	Role	Notes
2005	Green Street	West Ham United F.C. Academy Player	Credited as Robert Hall
2008	The Disappeared	Edward Bryant	UK horror film role
2009	Sherlock Holmes	Young Guard	
2011	Powder	Guy	
2015	Newcomer	Louis	
2015	Star Wars: The Force Awakens	First Order Officer #4	
2018	Halloween	Aaron Korey	
2020	Tenet	Well-Dressed Man	
2023	Oppenheimer	Haakon Chevalier	
2028	Elden Ring	TBA	Post-production

=== Television ===
Year	Title	Role	Notes
2007	Casualty	Marcus Dunlop	Episode: "The Personal Touch"; Credited as Robert Hall
2007	The Afternoon Play	Julian	Episode: "Come Fly with Me"; Credited as Robert Hall
2007	Doctors	Duncan Quigley	Episode: "Wings and Needles"; Credited as Robert Hall
2007	Clapham Junction	Mail Man	Channel 4 TV film
2008	The Bill	Jimmy Chadwick	Episode: "The Hit"
2008	Coming Up	Vincent	Episode: "Emo"
2008	Clone	Blonde Guy	Episode: "Alive"
2009	Emma	Robert Martin	3 episodes
2009	Breaking the Mould: The Story of Penicillin	Albert Alexander	TV film
2009	Did: Dissociative Identity Disorder	The Man	TV film
2010	Bloody Foreigners	John Kent	Episode: "The Untold Battle of Britain"
2011	Doctors	Nick Thorn	2 episodes
2011	Game of Thrones	Ser Hugh of the Vale	2 episodes
2012	Holby City	Sam Phillips	Episode: "A Woman's Work"
2012–2013	Wizards vs Aliens	Varg	Series 1–2
2013	Two Doors Down	Henning	Pilot
2013–2015	Vikings	Torstein	17 episodes (seasons 1–3)
2014	Our World War	Fred Steele	Episode "The First Day"
2016	Beowulf: Return to the Shieldlands	Jogan	Episodes 7–8
2016	Barbarians Rising	Viriathus	Episode: "Resistance"
2017	Taboo	Thorne Geary	6 episodes
2018	Silent Witness	Fergus Weir	2 episodes
2020	Devs	Pete	Miniseries; recurring role
2022–present	House of the Dragon	Jason and Tyland Lannister	Hall plays identical twins Main role; 17 episodes
