= Helen O'Hara (journalist) =

Northern Irish film critic and journalist

- Born: Portstewart, County Londonderry, Northern Ireland
- Education: University of Oxford
- Occupations: Writer; film critic; Podcaster
- Years active: 2003–present
- Employer: Empire
- Spouse: Andrea Campanella (m. 2025)
- Website: www.helenohara.com

Helen O'Hara is a Northern Irish film critic, journalist and podcaster, primarily known for working for Empire magazine, for which she is editor-at-large. She has also written for Time Out, The Guardian, The Telegraph, GQ, Digital Spy.

== Early life ==
O'Hara was born in Portstewart, County Londonderry, in Northern Ireland. She has said that she has always been a fan of film, with one of her earliest memories being to see Return of the Jedi in the cinema, but thought she had to choose a "sensible" career and so studied law.

== Career ==
I thought I might be able to make a move sideways into legal reporting, and gradually, somehow, work my way over to film writing, but that wouldn't have worked, I think. Changing careers takes skill, planning and a lot of luck. I got lucky then as a job came up for an internship at exactly the right time with Empire.

— Helen O'Hara, 2018

O'Hara studied law at Oxford University and began a career in it, but was unhappy with it and "bored out of [her] tiny mind". She quit her job as a barrister and, a few months later, got an intern interview for Empire. Though she had no journalistic experience, she says that the magazine had misplaced her CV, so her deep knowledge of the magazine got her the job. She became an intern and then staff writer at Empire, a role she held for eleven years before going freelance and contributing to other publications. She has said that during her early years at Empire, she was the only full-time female writer, and feels that some of the continued lack of female critics is a consequence of society discouraging women from having strong opinions in general and because women "get more flak" for holding opinions than men: "Empire had three staffers called Ian and about the same number of women". O'Hara's first review was of The Triplets of Belleville, which she wrote before she joined Empire and was unpaid.

She co-hosts the Empire podcast for Empire. Starting in 2012 during awards season, with David Roy of The Irish Times noting this was "long before everyone and their silver surfing granny had their own podcast", it is seen as one of the forces maintaining the success of Empire. The podcast went on a live UK tour in 2019, with filmmakers coming on as guests during the live recordings in front of crowds. O'Hara felt that the tour was risky, as they did not know if it would work, but that it was successful. As of 2019, O'Hara is a freelance film writer and the editor-at-large of Empire.

In addition to her work with Empire, O'Hara contributes to the BBC as a film journalist, including hosting Friday Film Club on the Lauren Laverne podcast. She also contributes to The Independent and The Guardian's film reporting. She wrote the book The Ultimate Superhero Movie Guide, published in 2020. She wrote the 2021 book Women Vs Hollywood: The Fall And Rise Of Women In Film.

== Bibliography ==
- O'Hara, Helen (2020). The Ultimate Superhero Movie Guide: The definitive handbook for comic book film fans. London: Carlton Books. ISBN 978-1-78739-260-1. OCLC 1145068903.
- O'Hara, Helen (2021). Women Vs Hollywood: The Fall And Rise Of Women In Film. Robinson. ISBN 9781472144423.
- O'Hara, Helen (2026). A Quentin Tarantino Dictionary: An A–Z of the iconic director and his work, from AK-47 to Zed. Welbeck. ISBN 978-1035417575.
