= Fabien Frankel =

French-English actor (born 1994)

- Born: Fabien Joseph Frankel; 6 April 1994 (age 32); London, England
- Education: London Academy of Music and Dramatic Art (BA)
- Occupation: Actor
- Years active: 2017–present
- Father: Mark Frankel

Fabien Joseph Frankel (born 6 April 1994) is an English actor and director. He is best known for his role as Ser Criston Cole in House of the Dragon, Anthony Grasso in Task, and Dominique Renelleau in The Serpent. Frankel is also an award-nominated director and producer.

== Early life and education ==
Frankel was born at Chelsea and Westminster Hospital in London, to English actor Mark Frankel (1962–1996) and French advertising executive Caroline Besson. His paternal grandmother was from an Iraqi Jewish family that moved to India, and his paternal grandfather's family were Ashkenazi Jewish emigrants from Russia and Poland to London's East End. Frankel's father died in a road accident when he was two, while his mother was pregnant with his younger brother Max. The two brothers were raised in London by their mother, and spoke French at home. She introduced them to film by taking them to the cinema once a week.

Frankel took a year-long foundation course at the Royal Academy of Dramatic Art (RADA) before going on to graduate with a Bachelor of Arts in Professional Acting from the London Academy of Music and Dramatic Art (LAMDA) in 2017.

== Career ==
Frankel's career began on stage in the 2017 production of The Knowledge at Charing Cross Theatre. He made his onscreen debut in 2019, in the romantic comedy film Last Christmas. That same year, he was cast as the lead, Theo Sipowicz, in a pilot for a potential NYPD Blue spin-off series on ABC.

In 2021, Frankel appeared as Dominique Renelleau in the BBC One and Netflix true crime drama The Serpent. Frankel was named a 2021 "Brit to Watch" by Variety. From 2022 to 2026 he portrayed Ser Criston Cole, a knight of the Kingsguard, in the HBO fantasy series House of the Dragon, a prequel to Game of Thrones and an adaptation of George R. R. Martin's 2018 fictional history book Fire and Blood.

In 2025, Frankel appeared in The Actor, directed by Oscar-nominated filmmaker Duke Johnson. Frankel also appeared in his second critically-acclaimed HBO series Task as detective Anthony Grasso opposite Mark Ruffalo.

In 2024 and 2025 respectively, Frankel directed two music videos, the first of which "Wife Once" by Memory of Speke was nominated for Best Music Video at Camerimage alongside artists such as ASAP Rocky, Taylor Swift, and Childish Gambino and won third place at the Berlin Music Video Awards. His second video, "The Tape is Chill" by Peter Zummo, was also nominated at the Berlin Music Video Awards in 2026, as well as for Best Music Video at SXSW London.

Following this success, he and his brother, Max Mark Frankel, founded production company MarcelMonique Pictures in 2025. Their first narrative short, Still Life, starring Ewan Mitchell, will premiere in 2026.

In 2026, Frankel was cast in Arkasha Stevenson's Untitled A24 Horror Film.

== Filmography ==
Year	Title	Role	Notes
2019	Last Christmas	Fabien	
2019	NYPD Blue	Theo Sipowicz	Pilot
2021	The Serpent	Dominique Renelleau	4 episodes
2021	An Uncandid Portrait	Gaspar Chevrolet	Episode: "Gone Today. Here Tomorrow."
2022–2026	House of the Dragon	Criston Cole	Main role; 21 episodes
2022	Venice at Dawn	Dixon	
2025	The Actor	Benny	
2025	Task	Anthony Grasso	Main role
TBA	Untitled Arkasha Stevenson film	TBA	Main role

== Stage ==
Year	Title	Role	Notes
2017	The Knowledge	Chris	Charing Cross Theatre, London
