= The Dragon in Winter =

- House of the Dragon episode
- Episode no.: Season 3 Episode 7
- Directed by: Nina Lopez-Corrado
- Written by: Philippa Goslett; Zenzele Price
- Cinematography by: Richard Donnelly
- Editing by: Frances Parker
- Original air date: August 2, 2026
- Running time: 63 minutes

Episode chronology
← Previous "Faceless Men"	Next → "The Treasons at Tumbleton"
- House of the Dragon season 3

"The Dragon in Winter" is the seventh episode of the third season of the fantasy drama television series House of the Dragon. A prequel to Game of Thrones, the series depicts the events leading up to the decline of House Targaryen during a devastating war of succession for the Iron Throne of Westeros known as the "Dance of the Dragons". The episode was written by Philippa Goslett and Zenzele Price and directed by Nina Lopez-Corrado. It first aired on HBO and HBO Max on August 2, 2026.

In the episode, Rhaenyra grows desperate for a sign that she is the chosen queen, and finds herself torn between Daemon and Mysaria. Aemond is similarly stuck between Alicent and Alys. Ormund treats with Corlys while Daeron and Gwayne fear coming danger. Aegon decides to finally stop running.

The episode received a positive reception from critics, who praised the thematic use of dragons and the performances of the cast, particularly Emma D'Arcy, Phoebe Campbell, and Tom Glynn-Carney, though responses to the Harrenhal storyline were mixed.

== Plot ==
In King's Landing, Helaena has multiple dreams: escaping the Red Keep, giving birth to her third child, burning smallfolk atop her dragon, Dreamfyre, and playing with her children during a snowstorm. Rhaenyra demands information from Helaena about her dreams, but she refuses to share anything. While searching for Vhagar, Addam tries to express romantic feelings to Baela, while she unwittingly exposes Alyn's feelings for her. They spot Sheepstealer with a dragonrider and return to King's Landing. At a Small Council meeting, Rhaenyra dismisses Torrhen's frustrations over being scapegoated for the Crown's financial problems and offhandedly sends Sabitha to claim Harrenhal with her army. After receiving Addam and Baela's report, Mysaria tries to convince Rhaenyra that Daemon has betrayed her. Mysaria meets Sylvi and offers to field petitions to Rhaenyra, but is rebuffed.

In the Eyrie, Jeyne tells Daemon she will no longer harbor Rhaena, and discloses her last whereabouts. Daemon tracks down Rhaena, who was planning to kill Vhagar to please Rhaenyra, but Rhaenyra and Addam find them. A fight breaks out between Sheepstealer, Syrax, Seasmoke, and Caraxes. Sheepstealer is heavily wounded and crawls away while the others fly to King's Landing. Baela visits Rhaena, who has been confined, and the sisters reconcile. Daemon apologizes to Rhaenyra for lying about the identity of Sheepstealer's rider. Rhaenyra instead seeks comfort with Mysaria, and the two get intimate.

At Harrenhal, Aemond has an intimate dream about Alicent, but wakes up in bed with Alys, only to be shocked by the real Alicent's arrival. Aemond kills Alicent's escort Adrian Redfort to maintain secrecy. Alys warns Aemond about his mother's intentions, but he doesn't believe her. Alicent later poisons Aemond's wine and flees the castle. Aemond collapses in front of Alys.

In Tumbleton, Gwayne informs Ormund that the Tully army will arrive in a day. Ormund appears unconcerned, having captured Corlys and sent his severed finger to Alyn to demoralize the Velaryon forces. He unsuccessfully attempts to convert Corlys to his side. Privately, Gwayne and Daeron question Ormund's plan, but conclude they can only let events play out. Ormund later meets with Ulf, and convinces him to swap sides by promising him Driftmark.

Attempting to reach the port of Maidenpool, Aegon, Larys, and Tyland are blocked by smallfolk fleeing from soldiers who search for Tyland. (Note: In "Rhaenyra Triumphant", it was revealed that Tyland emptied the coffers of King's Landing, and that only he knows where the gold is located.) Larys suggests that Tyland should surrender. Aegon and Tyland resolve to stop running and face their end with honor, while Larys abandons them. The soldiers later discover Aegon and Tyland, but a reawakened Sunfyre arrives and burns the army on Aegon's command.

== Production ==
=== Writing ===
"The Dragon in Winter" was written by Philippa Goslett, who also wrote the fifth episode "Unbowed and Unbent", and series co-producer Zenzele Price. The episode marks Goslett's second writing credit and Price's first.

Of Rhaenyra's mindset, Emma D'Arcy explained that "it has become increasingly important to Rhaenyra to know that her rule is preordained, that these trials, this suffering, is all part of a greater plan" and felt that this is what drives her to try to pressure Helaena for answers. D'Arcy and showrunner Ryan Condal discussed Rhaenyra's "descent into tyranny" at length both pre-production and during filming, and they both agreed that using a "sympathetic" character like Helaena could "expose something about the corrupting nature of power".

Matt Smith felt that Daemon had to "[juggle] a lot of human elements" in the episode when discussing how he was torn between protecting Rhaena and staying loyal to Rhaenyra and that he struggles with this. Director Nina Lopez-Corrado added that Daemon is "stuck in this really sticky position in which he has to convince both of these women that he was ultimately trying to do what was best for both of them even though they both feel like they were wronged". Phoebe Campbell noted that Rhaena has had a "humbling time" in the Vale which had led her to the point of trusting no one, including Daemon when he attempts to warn her to flee, while D'Arcy expressed that Rhaenyra has spent the whole season "trying to give Jace's death meaning" and that discovering that Rhaena is responsible "threatens to rob his death of meaning which, in turn, threatens total chaos".

Discussing the relationship between Aemond and Alys, Gayle Rankin stated that she believes Aemond does have genuine feelings for Alys and that she, in turn, finds him "refreshing" and "very misunderstood", referring to them as a "dark power couple". Of the dinner scene with Alicent, Rankin said, "I think Alys is in her element but also kind of terrified at the same time. But I think she feels like the stakes are very high, and I think Alys thrives in that. I think she intentionally wants it to feel unbearable. You know, because she wants [Alicent] to go."

Goslett explained Aegon has had "very little agency over his own path and his own future" in the preceding episodes of the season and that this leads him to conclude that "enough is enough" and to make his final stand on his own terms. Tom Glynn-Carney added that Aegon feels he has nothing left to lose, stating, "Sunfyre coming back is a miracle and Aegon transcends into his kind of phoenix moment" and reclaims some of his own power. Condal described Aegon burning the army as a "redemptive moment" and hoped that viewers would be surprised at how much they were rooting for him.

=== Filming ===
The episode was directed by Nina Lopez-Corrado, who also directed "Unbowed and Unbent". As such, this is her second directing credit on House of the Dragon.

The episode's climactic dragon battle between Sheepstealer, Caraxes, Seasmoke, and Syrax was filmed in the valleys of Capel Curig in Wales. Lopez-Corrado expressed that her brain "kind of exploded" when she discovered that four dragons would be fighting onscreen, while Goslett noted that the writers wanted it to be different to previous battles in the series by having the fight take place entirely on the ground. Condal likened the battle to a Godzilla movie, with the human characters trying to avoid being caught in the crossfire. Cinematographer Richard Donnelly advised that it was "very challenging" to ensure the actors knew where to look and react, and that crew members in blue suits were used as stand-ins for the dragons which, along with the pre-vis of the battle that was created by the visual effects team prior to filming, helped with clarifying where the dragons were meant to be in the shot at any given moment and to give the actors a sense of scale. Campbell, Clinton Liberty, and D'Arcy enjoyed filming on location, with D'Arcy feeling that the Welsh landscape helped to give a "sense of the scale of the realm", but noted that there were several logistical challenges with transporting the crew and equipment which added a "wonderful madness" to the experience, while Smith expressed that he disliked the repetitive shots and "highly technical" aspects involved in filming the battle but knew the final product would be enjoyable to watch.

The scene where Sunfyre burns the army was filmed over the course of three night shoots at Caesar's Camp in Surrey. Lighting effects were used on-location while the parts using actual fire were filmed on the Leavesden Studios backlot, with both elements being combined together by the visual effects team to create the completed scene that appear in the episode. Twenty-three stunt performers were set ablaze as part of the process, with stunt co-ordinator Rowley Irlam joking that he wanted to beat the record of twenty-two that was achieved during the eighth season of Game of Thrones and to set a new Guinness World Record, which they successfully did. The stunt was filmed in one take and was meticulously rehearsed beforehand to ensure it would be completed safely, and the stunt performers wore special costumes and prosthetic masks, and were covered in fire retardant gel to minimise the risk of injury. Glynn-Carney was excited to film the emotional and defiant speech that Aegon gives, describing it as a "big outburst" and a release of the tension and pressure that has been building in the character all season. He said that he would visualise a dam bursting and gallons of water sweeping the army away to help him get into Aegon's mindset before each take, and that he spoke to Lopez-Corrado at the beginning of the first night of shooting and told her he would only be able to film a limited number of takes due to the shouting and physicality required. Glynn-Carney said that he "threw [his] guts" into each take and ended up losing his voice and vomiting at the end of filming as a result.

=== Casting ===
The episode stars Matt Smith as Daemon Targaryen, Emma D'Arcy as Rhaenyra Targaryen, Olivia Cooke as Alicent Hightower, James Norton as Ormund Hightower, Steve Toussaint as Corlys Velaryon, Matthew Needham as Larys Strong, Sonoya Mizuno as Mysaria, Tom Glynn-Carney as Aegon II Targaryen, Ewan Mitchell as Aemond Targaryen, Bethany Antonia as Baela Targaryen, Phia Saban as Helaena Targaryen, Phoebe Campbell as Rhaena Targaryen, Jefferson Hall as Tyland Lannister, Kurt Egyiawan as Orwyle, Freddie Fox as Gwayne Hightower, Gayle Rankin as Alys Rivers, Abubakar Salim as Alyn of Hull, Clinton Liberty as Addam of Hull, Tom Bennett as Ulf White, Benjamin Evan Ainsworth as Daeron Targaryen, Joplin Sibtain as Jon Roxton, Tommy Flanagan as Roderick Dustin, and Dan Fogler as Torrhen Manderly.

It marks the final appearance of co-star Barry Sloane as Adrian Redfort following the death of the character.

== Release ==
The episode premiered on August 2, 2026, on HBO and HBO Max.

== Reception ==
Helen O'Hara of IGN gave the episode a score of 9 out of 10 and wrote, "it's another consistently entertaining episode in a consistently entertaining season, ramping up the drama without tipping its hand too much as we approach the finale." She lauded the use of dragons, both as ways to explore the emotional arcs of their riders and as weapons in the climactic battle in the Crownlands, and the continued depiction of Rhaenyra's paranoia. She summarised her thoughts by writing, "this penultimate episode of the third season is holding fire - sometimes literally, in the case of several dragons - but tightening the screws on its characters significantly. The cracks are showing in Rhaenyra's psyche, particularly in her pleas to Helaena for vindication, and her alliances look increasingly shaky. It's all going Ormund's way – but can he deliver a killing blow?".

Alec Bojaland of Den of Geek similarly praised the episode's use of dragons, writing "the way in which House of the Dragon has used its dragons as independent operators in that downfall (and not merely symbols of royal decadence and hubris) is a pretty remarkable thing", and lauded the characterisation of Aegon. Concluding his review, he wrote, "given House of the Dragon season 2's unusually truncated ending and season 3's unusually epic beginning, it doesn't feel like there's a lot of momentum heading into next week's finale. But if the forecast provided by the dreams and dragons in this penultimate episode are any indication, we should soon have plenty of fire and blood on our doorstep."

Writing for Forbes, Erik Kain called "The Dragon in Winter" "shockingly good" and wrote that, "the penultimate episode of House of the Dragon Season 3, "The Dragon in Winter" may be the best of the season so far, filled with tense dragon battles, shocking betrayals and some of the seasons best dialogue", and adding, "it was excellent for many reasons, but mostly for the dragons. I'm not sure I've ever seen anything quite like what we just witnessed in TV or movies." He lauded "pure animalistic terror" of the fight between Sheepstealer and the other dragons and the continuation of Aegon's storyline, but criticised the Harrenhal scenes, feeling they were "not working at all". He summarised his thoughts by writing, "this was a terrific episode. Well-written, action-packed, filled with betrayal and some incredibly tense stand-offs, and the only things I didn't like about it are really the little annoying things that have been going on for all season (or longer) and I think much of that is about to end. We have one episode left and I suspect it will be blood and fire. Or fire and blood, whichever comes first."

In a more mixed review, Daniel Roman of Winter is Coming wrote, ""The Dragon in Winter" is one of the weirdest penultimate episodes of the entire Game of Thrones franchise. It features some good material, including an incredible payoff for Aegon Targaryen and Sunfyre, but is sadly hampered by the loose plotting and even looser staging for its big dragon showdown. From the thin setup with Rhaena to the over-reliance on CGI, the dragon showdown might be one of the most underwhelming large setpieces of the series to date. Throw in Alicent Hightower's misguided journey to Harrenhal and the show's adamant decision to flatten her and Aemond as characters to one or two defining characteristics, and it makes for an extremely mixed watch". Despite his varying opinions on the episode as a whole, Roman praised the performances of a lot of the cast, including Emma D'Arcy, Phoebe Campbell, Tom Glynn-Carney, Matt Smith, Amanda Collin, Ewan Mitchell, Olivia Cooke, Tom Bennett, and Phia Saban.
