= The Treasons at Tumbleton =

- House of the Dragon episode
- Rhaenyra giving a speech to the smallfolk of King's Landing
- Episode no.: Season 3 Episode 8
- Directed by: Andrij Parekh
- Written by: Ryan Condal; Ti Mikkel
- Cinematography by: Vanja Cernjul
- Editing by: Adam Bosman
- Original air date: August 9, 2026
- Running time: 71 minutes

Episode chronology
← Previous "The Dragon in Winter"	Next → —
- House of the Dragon season 3

"The Treasons at Tumbleton" is the eighth episode and season finale of the third season of the fantasy drama television series House of the Dragon. A prequel to Game of Thrones, the series depicts the events leading up to the decline of House Targaryen during a devastating war of succession for the Iron Throne of Westeros known as the "Dance of the Dragons". The episode was written by showrunner Ryan Condal and Ti Mikkel and directed by Andrij Parekh. It first aired on HBO and HBO Max on August 9, 2026.

In the episode, Rhaenyra becomes increasingly desperate for her reign to be accepted by the people of Westeros, while Alys reveals her history to Aemond. Daemon and the Tully army converge on Tumbleton, intent to end Ormund and Daeron's challenge for the throne once and for all.

The episode received a highly positive reception from critics, who praised the characterisation of Rhaenyra, the climactic battle at Tumbleton, and the performances of the cast, particularly Emma D'Arcy, Matt Smith, Phia Saban, Tom Glynn-Carney, Ewan Mitchell, Gayle Rankin, Tom Bennett and Tommy Flanagan.

== Plot ==
In King's Landing, Rhaenyra is distressed to learn that both Aegon and Sunfyre are alive. She sends Daemon to join the Tully army at Tumbleton and becomes increasingly more ruthless with others, having Baela detained after being criticised by her and abruptly exiling Mysaria to Pentos. On her way from the city, Mysaria warns Helaena that Rhaenyra will never let her leave. When Helaena refuses to eat and chastises Rhaenyra's rule, Rhaenyra has her force-fed. Velaryon soldiers challenge Alyn as their commander, but Alyn claims to be Corlys' heir. Despite Addam's concerns, Alyn accompanies Rhaenyra to the Grand Sept, where she has him kill the High Septon after he refuses to anoint her. Rhaenyra then delivers a speech to the smallfolk about Aegon the Conqueror's dream, declaring herself as a prophesied ruler and calling herself "Rhaenyra the Chosen". Mysaria, who had escaped the guards, witnesses the speech among the smallfolk.

At Harrenhal, Alys reveals to Aemond her true identity: she was a lover of Harren the Black, the original ruler of Harrenhal, making her over a century old. When Harrenhal was destroyed by Aegon the Conqueror's dragon Balerion, Alys tried to save her dying son with dark magic, but was cursed with immortality instead. Later, Aegon arrives on Sunfyre and Aemond, shocked, shows remorse for trying to kill him. Aegon tells Aemond they need to find Vhagar and retake the Iron Throne together.

At Tumbleton, Ormund knights Daeron and lines the ramparts with children to dissuade Daemon from using Caraxes. Believing that Ormund has gone mad and is going to get them all killed, Gwayne and Daeron free Corlys and bring him to Daemon to negotiate. Gwayne proposes they divide the realm, Corlys concurring, but Daemon refuses. As the battle begins, Roderick's Winter Wolves scale the walls, Caraxes bursts through the main gate, and Oscar's men attack from the side. Gwayne dissuades Daeron from joining the battle on Tessarion. Ormund frantically searches for Ulf and finds him drunk, beating him and ordering him to join the fight. Ulf does, incinerating large swaths of the Tully army with Silverwing before burning Tumbleton as well, killing Ormund and Roderick while they fight. Daemon barely survives a brutal duel with Jon when Ulf's attack interrupts them. In the aftermath of the battle, Corlys convinces Daemon to retreat, Gwayne cannot find Daeron, and a distraught Hugh discovers that Kat had been killed.

Rhaenyra returns to the Red Keep and is informed that Helaena had jumped from a window to her death. At an encampment in the Riverlands, Alicent sees a group of butterflies. Rhaenyra finds Helaena's unfinished tapestry, which depicts Helaena's death and Rhaenyra sitting on the Iron Throne surrounded by fire and blood.

== Production ==
=== Writing ===
"The Treasons at Tumbleton" was written by showrunner Ryan Condal and Ti Mikkel. The episode marks Condal's eighth writing credit and Mikkel's second after the season two episode "Regent".

Speaking of Aemond's reunion with Aegon, Ewan Mitchell explained that, "because of everything that [Aemond] has gone through at Harrenhal, he's changed, and he realizes that actually he's a pretty bad person" and Tom Glynn-Carney added that Aegon feels "let down" by the fact that his brother is now "weak and pathetic" and that Aegon is now motivated by wanting "revenge" on Rhaenyra. Mitchell stated that Aemond is "torn between Alys and the new life that he envisioned for himself, and going back to the past".

Sonoya Mizuno felt that Rhaenyra had "chosen a path with Daemon" in the episode, which left no room for Mysaria, whom Mizuno described as a "moral compass". She stated that Rhaenyra's actions are "really disturbing" for Mysaria, who feels both shocked and guilty for helping to raise her up. Regarding Rhaenyra's speech, Condal explained that the writers wanted "a real seismic change, a sea change in Rhaenyra's relationship to her people" leading into the final season and that in the book, "there is a bunch of talk about how Rhaenyra became very despotic, and became a tyrant at the end, and was very unpopular with the people." Condal felt that the crowd "have no idea of all the quote-unquote real history that went into Rhaenyra making that speech," which explains why there is no reference to it occurring in Martin's Fire & Blood.

Discussing Helaena's death, Emma D'Arcy explained, "Helaena is sort of the moral heart of the show, I think. She's maybe the only character who has a proximity to power, but reminds uncontaminated and so, I think her death condemns Rhaenyra to the path she's chosen. I think there's no way back after that. There's certainly no route back to a more moderate form of leadership." D'Arcy further stated that they felt Helaena's death was likely to be "impassible" in Rhaenyra's relationship with Alicent. Phia Saban added that she felt Helaena's arc was one of "tragedy" explaining that "the feeling from Rhaenyra is that she feels extremely violated. She feels her freedom’s been violated by her and her relationship to freedom and to nature and to all of the things that feed her as a person have been taken away," and that the conversation with Mysaria was a "confirmation of what Helaena already feels, which is that she is never going to live a life again in which she feels alive." Saban also felt there was "poetry" in Helaena "genuiniely [throwing] herself into the world" due to the character's affinity for nature.

Regarding the battle at Tumbelton, Condal stated, "all season long, we're setting up this classic medieval siege, which is really where we wanted to get to, and the fun of that, the concept of that battle was that Ormund had basically done all he could to blunt the threat of Rhaenyra's greatest power — which is that she has, or had, six dragons, under her command at that point," and that he wanted to craft a battle where the dragons were largely "off the board". Benjamin Evan Ainsworth stated that the battle being held in his name "weighs on [Daeron] a lot", and that Ormund putting the lives of everyone in jeopardy "spurs him on" to wanting to be a good leader even though it is not something he ever originally wanted. Mikkel noted that Daemon has been waiting for the chance to take down Ormund all season, with Matt Smith adding that battles "make him feel alive".

Regarding Ormund's depiction in the episode, James Norton explained, "the key thing throughout Ormund's journey was to anchor him and make him feel human through his love for Daeron. The two key moments are the knighting scene, which needed to be played for total authenticity, and the moment where he finds out that Daeron has betrayed him". Of his death, Norton stated, "Ormund is fascistic in his hatred of the Targaryens, in his conviction that the Hightowers are the superior. So there's something really cathartic about watching Ulf — the lowliest, most base, comedic and ludicrous of all the Targaryens and dragonriders — beating him," and Tom Bennett described further Ormund's beating of Ulf as "the biggest mistake of his life". Norton enjoyed the character's confrontation with Roderick, noting that, "I loved the odd intimacy it created between Tommy and I — the idea that we die together, and are preserved. It reminded me of the graves when you find these couples intertwined, these two skeletons. These incongruous people end up dying in the same dragon fire and looking the same way in a strangely intimate sort of pose." Norton further expressed his belief that it was the right time for Ormund to die, joking that he "wouldn't have been so delicious were he to have survived".

=== Filming ===
The episode was directed by Andrij Parekh, who also directed the season two episode "Smallfolk". As such, this is his second directing credit on House of the Dragon.

The scenes directly outside of Tumbleton were filmed at Hankley Common in Surrey, while the rest were filmed within the large Tumbleton set on the Leavesden Studios backlot, a scaled-down model of which was sent to Parekh by the show's art department to allow him and cinematography Vanja Cernjul, whom he'd previously worked with on "Smallfolk", to plan out how to approach each part of the battle using small soldier figurines. Parekh described Daemon's speech to his army prior to the battle as a "Braveheart moment" and that it was important for him to use a lot of wide shots to show the scale of the army alongside close-ups to capture Daemon's emotion. The battle required a large amount of stunt work, with stunt co-ordinator Rowley Irlam describing the episode as the largest-scale siege in the franchise's history. The scene of Caraxes burning the main gates of Tumbleton was done practically using a flamethrower and stuntmen on horseback, with Condal describing it as a "deeply satisfying moment in House of the Dragon lore" and a "triumph for all of the different departments" which allowed them to depict Daemon as a great warrior. To depict Silverwing's destruction of Tumbleton, the special effects team filmed nine different explosions over a two-week period, with supervisor Mike Dawson electing to include some curvatures in the explosions to make the shots more dynamic.

Parekh compared Rhaenyra to Darth Vader during the scenes at the High Sept. Armour supervisor Simon Brindle and costume designer Caroline McCall created Rhaenyra's coronation outfit, which D'Arcy described as "one of the biggest visual changes we've seen on Rhaenyra" since the first season, while D'Arcy and Make-up designer Amanda Knight conceived of Rhaenyra's red eye makeup, which D'Arcy referred to as "war paint" to ensure the Rhaenyra's beauty was not "swamped" by the Joan of Arc-style chainmail and to indicate that Rhaenyra was more cognizant of her own imagery and iconography. The episode used a large crowd of supporting artists for the scene where Rhaenyra delivers a speech outside the Grand Sept, with D'Arcy expressing that they fed off the crowd's energy to inform their own performance, and Condal advising that D'Arcy filmed several variations of the speech to allow the editors freedom to construct one that matched Condal's vision.

Condal explained that Helaena's tapestry was introduced to allow the show to visually and tangibly depict the character's dreams. The tapestry itself was created by the show's art team, with lead graphic artist Alicia Grace Martin advising that it was purposefully designed to be more symbolic and abstract. Martin drew and coloured each part of the tapestry herself, and added the loose strings by hand, which she felt foreshadowed Helaena's madness and despair, as well as giving Saban something to pull on during scenes.

=== Casting ===
The episode stars Matt Smith as Daemon Targaryen, Emma D'Arcy as Rhaenyra Targaryen, Olivia Cooke as Alicent Hightower, James Norton as Ormund Hightower, Steve Toussaint as Corlys Velaryon, Sonoya Mizuno as Mysaria, Tom Glynn-Carney as Aegon II Targaryen, Ewan Mitchell as Aemond Targaryen, Bethany Antonia as Baela Targaryen, Phia Saban as Helaena Targaryen, Kurt Egyiawan as Orwyle, Freddie Fox as Gwayne Hightower, Gayle Rankin as Alys Rivers, Abubakar Salim as Alyn of Hull, Clinton Liberty as Addam of Hull, Kieran Bew as Hugh Hammer, Tom Bennett as Ulf White, Ellora Torchia as Kat, Benjamin Evan Ainsworth as Daeron Targaryen, Joplin Sibtain as Jon Roxton, Tommy Flanagan as Roderick Dustin, and Dan Fogler as Torrhen Manderly.

It marks the final appearance of Norton as Ormund Hightower, Flanagan as Roderick Dustin, Torchia as Kat, and Saban as Helaena Targaryen, following the deaths of their characters.

== Release ==
The episode premiered on August 9, 2026, on HBO and HBO Max.

== Reception ==
Helen O'Hara of IGN gave the episode a score of 9 out of 10 and wrote, "as a finale to a stellar season, this was less fist-in-the-air triumphant than we hoped, mostly because this battle had no clear winner. Still, it's hard to quibble with what's here. We get a charge by the Northmen, not one but two dragons attacking the town of Tumbleton, sudden reversals and significant deaths. An honourable man does something horrible; a terrible human shows some measure of grace. Rhaenyra is driving more and more allies away from her side, while Daemon continues to insist that every problem can be solved with dragon fire. The traitorous Ulf is presumably in the wind, and you have to wonder who Hugh the Hammer is going to hold responsible for this latest blow to his family." She lauded Phia Saban's performance as Helaena, stating that she "has given one of the most quietly and consistently compelling performances this season" and called the battle scenes "spectacular".

Erik Kain of Forbes lauded the episode, calling it a "season finale rivalling the best of Game of Thrones" and giving it a score of 9 out of 10. He stated that the battle of Tumbleton was "one of the most genuinely awesome I've seen put to screen" and wrote "the battle was astonishing, a scope and scale that we haven't seen in this show. House of the Dragon likes to zoom in close, very close, cramped corridors and bedchambers, claustrophobic conversations. Now, at last, it zoomed way out instead, and soared." Kain also praised the scene between Aegon and Aemond at Harrenhal, but was generally more mixed on the show's continued reliance on the prophecy.

Daniel Roman of Winter is Coming also gave the episode a positive review, writing, "the Battle of Tumbleton brings horror and spectacle in equal measure, while Rhaenyra Targaryen fully embraces her new era of unhinged tyranny" and called it a "gold standard" for the series as a whole. He lauded the battle as "epic in every sense of the word" and stated that "the series has done great battles before, but with Tumbleton it has finally achieved something that deserves the same sort of recognition as Game of Thrones' best. The production is flawless, the action is intense, and the big moments leap off the screen. It's all the better for the fact that there is no clear winner; the Dance of the Dragons is filled with prryhic victories, and the show's version of the Battle of Tumbleton perfectly fits that theme." He also praised Emma D'Arcy's performance and the show's commitment to showing Rhaenyra's tyranny and wrote, "not only does the season 3 finale give us Rhaenyra at her darkest, it takes her even further than I expected, all while Emma D'Arcy delivers the performance of a lifetime. There is no doubt in my mind that they deserve an Emmy nod for their work in this season, and this finale exemplifies why." He called Parekh's directing "masterful" during the scenes with Rhaenyra and Helaena and enjoyed the writing and fleshing out of Alys' backstory, adding "Alys' heartwrenching confession is played beautifully by Gayle Rankin, who delivers perhaps her strongest acting of the season here". He also praised the performances of Tom Glynn-Carney, Tommy Flanagan, James Norton, and Matt Smith, declaring the episode "one of [Smith's] strongest out of any episode in the entire series to date". Roman enjoyed the show's depiction of Ormund's hypocrisy, the hardening of Ulf's character, and the battle's focus on strategy, lauding Condal and Mikkel's script.

Alec Bojalad of Den of Geek was more mixed on the episode, believing the finale was ultimately weighed down by the preceding episodes of the season. He praised the performances of Tommy Flanagan and Gayle Rankin, the "spectacle" of the battle of Tumbleton, and felt the changes made around Rhaenyra and the prophecy were "effective", but was mixed on the reveal of Alys' backstory, feeling that the character seems "somewhat diminished" now that her past has been shared. He was negative about the death of Helaena and expressed that he felt the show did not do enough to explain why the character had to die.
