= House of the Dragon season 3 =

Season of streaming series

House of the Dragon
- Season 3
- Promotional poster
- Showrunner: Ryan Condal
- Starring: Matt Smith; Emma D'Arcy; Olivia Cooke; James Norton; Steve Toussaint; Fabien Frankel; Matthew Needham; Sonoya Mizuno; Tom Glynn-Carney; Ewan Mitchell; Harry Collett; Phia Saban; Bethany Antonia; Jefferson Hall; Abubakar Salim; Clinton Liberty; Phoebe Campbell; Kurt Egyiawan; Freddie Fox; Gayle Rankin; Kieran Bew; Tom Bennett; Joplin Sibtain; Ellora Torchia; Tommy Flanagan; Simon Russell Beale; Dan Fogler; Benjamin Evan Ainsworth
- No. of episodes: 8

Release
- Original network: HBO
- Original release: June 21 – August 9, 2026

Season chronology
- ← Previous; Season 2

The third season of the American fantasy drama television series House of the Dragon premiered on HBO on June 21, 2026, in the United States and concluded on August 9, 2026. It consists of eight episodes, each of approximately one hour. The season covers the events of the book Fire & Blood, a prequel novel in the A Song of Ice and Fire series by George R. R. Martin. The season was ordered on June 13, 2024, three days before the premiere of the second season. Ryan Condal serves as the sole showrunner for the season. The third season was filmed from March to October 2025.

The season follows in the aftermath of the second season's final episodes, in which the war known as the "Dance of Dragons" between Rhaenyra Targaryen and her half-brother Aegon II Targaryen continues, causing House Targaryen to become further divided. Aegon is supported by the Green Council and his mother Alicent Hightower, while Rhaenyra is supported by the Black Council and her husband and uncle Daemon Targaryen, both sides seeking allies from the great houses of Westeros and fighting for the support of their armies to claim their rightful positions to the Iron Throne.

House of the Dragon features a large ensemble cast, including established actors such as Matt Smith, Emma D'Arcy, Olivia Cooke, James Norton, Steve Toussaint, Fabien Frankel, Matthew Needham, and Sonoya Mizuno. The season premiere was watched by 21.5 million viewers across both linear and streaming platforms worldwide upon its release. By the time the finale aired, the season had averaged 33 million worldwide viewers per episode. Critics praised the production values, visual effects, writing, Ramin Djawadi's musical score, action sequences, and performances (particularly Smith, D’Arcy, Cooke, and Norton). A fourth and final season was ordered in November 2025.

== Episodes ==
No. overall	No. in season	Title	Directed by	Written by	Original release date	U.S. viewers (millions)
19	1	"Salt and Sea, Fire and Blood"	Loni Peristere	Ryan Condal	June 21, 2026	0.86
Rhaena mounts the dragon Sheepstealer and eventually bonds with him. Aegon and Larys are captured by guards loyal to Rhaenyra. Larys reveals their identities, believing they will make valuable hostages. Alicent finds Aemond on the Iron Throne, who claims Aegon has abdicated. She urges him to seize Harrenhal. Alicent forges a letter from Aemond and sends it to Ormund Hightower to delay the Hightower army. Daemon defeats Jason Lannister's forces and gains new allies, the Winter Wolves led by Roderick Dustin, who delivers Jason's severed head. Addam, Hugh, and Ulf wait to ambush Aemond at Harrenhal, but Alys urges them to leave. The Triarchy engages the Velaryon fleet at the Gullet and sacks High Tide. Lohar breaks from the battle to pursue Corlys. Jace has Rhaenyra confined to keep her from joining the battle. He and Baela fly their dragons, Vermax and Moondancer, to stop the Triarchy. Corlys navigates a rocky pass with Lohar in pursuit. Lohar throws Tyland overboard and rams Corlys's ship, which breaks apart. Corlys falls overboard, and Alyn kills Lohar. Rhaena arrives on Sheepstealer, who attacks ships indiscriminately. Vermax is shot by a scorpion bolt and drowns. Jace is killed by Triarchy bowmen.
20	2	"Queen's Landing"	Clare Kilner	Sara Hess	June 28, 2026	0.97
Addam, Hugh, and Ulf pursue the Triarchy's remnants at the Gullet. Baela brings Jace's body to Dragonstone, leaving Rhaenyra emotionally distraught over her son's death. Jeyne asks a guilt-stricken Rhaena to leave the Vale, but Rhaena offers to protect it with Sheepstealer. Aegon and Larys escape captivity. Addam finds Corlys, who offers to legitimize Alyn. Alicent meets Luthor Largent, commander of the City Watch, and asks him to surrender the city to Rhaenyra. Jasper Wylde discovers this and attempts to rape her, but Orwyle has him arrested. Daemon receives word of Jace's death and returns to Dragonstone. Rhaenyra asks him to learn the identity of Sheepstealer's dragonrider. Aemond reaches Harrenhal on Vhagar, kills Simon Strong, but is injured, and begs Alys for help. Rhaenyra, Daemon, Hugh, and Ulf arrive in King's Landing on their dragons. Luthor reveals his loyalty to Daemon and arrests Hightower supporters. Rhaenyra demands Aegon, but learns he has fled the city. Daemon receives an imprisoned Otto as a gift from Larys. An emotional Rhaenyra beheads Otto, and Daemon beheads Jasper. Rhaenyra ascends the Iron Throne. Alicent, Helaena, and Jaehaera's escape attempt fails, and they are brought before Rhaenyra and Otto's decapitated body.
21	3	"Rhaenyra Triumphant"	Clare Kilner	Sara Hess	July 5, 2026	0.89
Ormund reluctantly submits to Daemon, who takes Daeron Targaryen hostage and tells Rhaenyra they should execute him. Corlys informs Rhaenyra that the treasury has been emptied. Alicent suggests declaring Aegon dead, and Rhaenyra agrees. The High Septon refuses to anoint Rhaenyra without proof of Aegon's death and warns her not to antagonize the Faith. Corlys names Alyn his heir and asks Rhaenyra to legitimize him and Addam. Rhaenyra hears out petitioners and learns that the wealthy have starved the smallfolk. Daemon knights Addam, Hugh, and Ulf, but Rhaenyra does not legitimize Addam. Rhaenyra hosts a banquet for the city's nobility, serves them rats, and has the City Watch raid their storehouses for hoarded food. Daemon unsuccessfully urges Rhaenyra to seize the world with their dragons. She later addresses the smallfolk and distributes food with Mysaria. Corlys chastises Rhaenyra for not legitimizing Addam despite her own children's parentage and calls them bastards. Rhaenyra allows Alicent to see Daeron, but Alicent does not recognize him. The boy reveals that Ormund forced him to pose as Daeron. A dragonkeeper informs Rhaenyra that Ormund has seized the town of Tumbleton and is keeping Daeron's young dragon within its walls.
22	4	"Tumbleton"	Clare Kilner	David Hancock	July 12, 2026	0.92
Hightower soldiers harass Tumbleton's smallfolk. A soldier assaults Kat, Hugh Hammer's wife, but her brother defends her, and the soldier is punished. Daeron learns that Ormund plans to make him king. Ormund then forces Daeron to execute Kat's brother. Aegon and Larys find Sunfyre's body, which Aegon mourns. They reach Rook's Rest, now overrun with refugees, and are required to clean the latrines. Aegon protests and is forced to humiliate himself. Criston and Gwayne reach Harrenhal, where Alys claims Aemond is gone. Alyn informs Rhaenyra that Corlys has left to combat the Triarchy's remnants. Orwyle cautions Rhaenyra against removing the High Septon. Rhaenyra makes Torrhen Manderly the Master of Coin, so he takes the blame for the city's financial problems. Rhaenyra sends Hugh and Ulf to observe Tumbleton. Ulf tells Rhaenyra that the smallfolk are spreading rumors of her children's illegitimacy. She sends the City Watch to find those responsible. After Daemon receives gold from Jeyne, his dragon Caraxes leads him to Rhaena and Sheepstealer. Daemon attempts to ease Rhaena's guilt over Jace's death, but she flees. He brings Rhaenyra the head of whom he claims was Sheepstealer's rider, but she remains dissatisfied. Alicent discovers that Helaena is pregnant.
23	5	"Unbowed and Unbent"	Nina Lopez-Corrado	Philippa Goslett	July 19, 2026	0.95
Alys helps Aemond recover in Harrenhal. He later saves her when men arrive to collect a bounty on him. Aegon blames Aemond for his own failings, causing Larys to berate Aegon for his privileged upbringing. Tyland joins them at Rook's Rest. Aegon kills the man who humiliated him after he learns Aegon's identity. Addam and Baela search for signs of Aemond. Criston and Gwayne use guerrilla tactics against Oscar Tully's forces. Criston's army travels on foot to intercept the Tully forces marching south, but discovers they are too late after reaching a burned bridge. Refusing to give up, Criston tells Gwayne he plans to die in combat. Gwayne then abandons him. Alicent fails to convince Helaena to abort her pregnancy. Mysaria stops them from escaping and discovers Helaena's pregnancy. Alicent convinces her not to inform Rhaenyra. Alicent and Helaena use a secret passage to escape but become trapped. Daemon investigates the murders of multiple City Watchmen. After torturing one of the killers, Daemon learns Ormund paid for their deaths. He informs Rhaenyra that Ormund has declared Daeron king and is minting coins with his likeness. Daemon later finds Luthor and several City Watchmen gruesomely killed and labelled as traitors.
24	6	"Faceless Men"	Loni Peristere	David Hancock & Shyam Popat	July 26, 2026	0.98
Criston's army is ambushed by Tully soldiers. Criston challenges Roderick and Oscar to a duel, but Alysanne Blackwood shoots him dead. Aegon, Larys, and Tyland plan to flee to Essos. Jeyne chastises Rhaena after she is caught attempting to see Baela. Alyn comforts a troubled Baela. Alys shows Aemond a hidden clutch of dragon eggs and suggests they rule Harrenhal together. Daemon disguises himself as a City Watchman and kills an assailant after interrogating him. He then publicly humiliates Ulf for abandoning his duties. With men deserting the City Watch, the smallfolk blame Rhaenyra for rampant crime. She promises that Velaryon soldiers will help. Rhaenyra sends assassins to Tumbleton posing as envoys from House Baratheon. Gwayne deduces the ruse and kills the assassins, saving Ormund and Daeron. Hugh sneaks into Tumbleton to see Kat, but she refuses to leave with him. After their failed escape attempt, Rhaenyra confines Alicent and Helaena more strictly, causing Helaena's mental health to deteriorate. Alicent tells Rhaenyra that Helaena dreamed of Aemond at Harrenhal. Rhaenyra offers to free them if Alicent goes to Harrenhal and kills Aemond. At Alyn's request, Corlys sends men to King's Landing, but is captured by Jon Roxton.
25	7	"The Dragon in Winter"	Nina Lopez-Corrado	Philippa Goslett & Zenzele Price	August 2, 2026	0.79
Rhaenyra interrogates Helaena about her dreams. Mysaria tries to convince Rhaenyra that Daemon has betrayed her after Addam and Baela report spotting Sheepstealer with a rider. Sylvi criticizes Mysaria's position among the nobility. Jeyne informs Daemon that Rhaena has fled. Daemon tracks down Rhaena, who was planning to kill Vhagar so Rhaenyra would spare her. After Rhaenyra and Addam arrive, their dragons help Caraxes attack and heavily wound Sheepstealer. Rhaena is brought to King's Landing and reunites with Baela. Daemon justifies having deceived Rhaenyra to protect his daughter. Rhaenyra accuses Mysaria of manipulating her before they have sex. Alicent finds Aemond at Harrenhal but Alys warns him not to trust her. Aemond kills Alicent's escort, Adrian Redfort, to maintain secrecy. Alicent poisons Aemond, who collapses, and flees. Gwayne informs Ormund that the Tully army has almost reached Tumbleton. Daeron and Gwayne contemplate surrendering. Ormund tells Corlys that his captivity will dissuade the Velaryon army from aiding Rhaenyra. Alyn receives his father's severed ring finger. Ormund convinces the dissatisfied Ulf to betray Rhaenyra by offering him Driftmark. Larys abandons Aegon after learning that soldiers are searching for Tyland. Aegon and Tyland are later discovered, but Sunfyre appears and kills the soldiers.
26	8	"The Treasons at Tumbleton"	Andrij Parekh	Ryan Condal & Ti Mikkel	August 9, 2026	1.14
After learning that Aegon is alive, Rhaenyra becomes more ruthless. She detains Baela, dismisses Mysaria, and has a despondent Helaena force-fed. Rhaenyra has Alyn kill the High Septon after he refuses to anoint her and tells the smallfolk of Aegon the Conqueror's dream, stating that she is prophesied to rule. Alys informs Aemond that she became cursed with immortality after failing to save her dying son with magic. Aegon tells a remorseful Aemond to find Vhagar and help retake the Iron Throne. With the Tully army outside Tumbleton, Ormund lines the ramparts with children to dissuade Daemon from using Caraxes. Daeron and Gwayne free Corlys before negotiating with Daemon to divide the realm, but he refuses. Ormund finds Ulf hungover and beats him. Roderick's Winter Wolves scale Tumbleton's walls while Caraxes destroys the main gate. Ulf mounts Silverwing and attacks the Tully forces before burning Tumbleton, killing Ormund and Roderick while they fight. Jon duels Daemon, but Ulf's attack interrupts them. Corlys convinces Daemon to retreat. Gwayne cannot find Daeron while Hugh finds Kat dead. Rhaenyra learns that Helaena jumped from a window to her death, leaving a tapestry showing Rhaenyra on the Iron Throne surrounded by fire and blood.

== Cast and characters ==
=== Main ===
- Matt Smith as Daemon Targaryen
- Emma D'Arcy as Rhaenyra Targaryen
- Olivia Cooke as Alicent Hightower
- James Norton as Ormund Hightower
- Steve Toussaint as Corlys Velaryon
- Fabien Frankel as Criston Cole
- Matthew Needham as Larys Strong
- Sonoya Mizuno as Mysaria
- Tom Glynn-Carney as Aegon II Targaryen
- Ewan Mitchell as Aemond Targaryen
- Harry Collett as Jacaerys "Jace" Velaryon
- Phia Saban as Helaena Targaryen
- Bethany Antonia as Baela Targaryen
- Jefferson Hall as identical twins: Jason Lannister and Tyland Lannister
- Abubakar Salim as Alyn of Hull
- Clinton Liberty as Addam of Hull
- Phoebe Campbell as Rhaena Targaryen
- Kurt Egyiawan as Orwyle
- Freddie Fox as Gwayne Hightower
- Gayle Rankin as Alys Rivers
- Kieran Bew as Hugh Hammer
- Tom Bennett as Ulf White
- Joplin Sibtain as Jon Roxton
- Ellora Torchia as Kat
- Tommy Flanagan as Roderick Dustin
- Simon Russell Beale as Simon Strong
- Dan Fogler as Torrhen Manderly
- Benjamin Evan Ainsworth as Daeron Targaryen

=== Recurring ===
- Archie Barnes as Oscar Tully
- Annie Shapero as Alysanne Blackwood
- Amanda Collin as Jeyne Arryn
- Michelle Bonnard as Sylvi
- Tom Cullen as Luthor Largent
- Richard Flood as Edgar
- Jordon Stevens as Elinda Massey
- Barry Sloane as Adrian Redfort
- Oliver Coopersmith as Janos
- Sarah Woodward as Sabitha Frey
- Oscar Eskinazi as Joffrey Velaryon

=== Guest ===
- Paul Kennedy as Jasper Wylde
- Max Wrottesley as Lorent Marbrand
- Phil Daniels as Gerardys
- Nicholas Jones as Bartimos Celtigar
- Abigail Thorn as Sharako Lohar
- Ben Dilloway as Soren
- Vincent Regan as Rickard Thorne
- James Doherty as Cley
- Samson Kayo as Mujja
- Graeme McKnight as Paxter Strong
- Paul Valentine as Germund Strong
- Paul Clayton as Lord Merryweather
- Miriam Lucia as Lady Fell (uncredited)
- Rhys Ifans as Otto Hightower (uncredited)
- Simon Chandler as High Septon Eustace
- Patrice Naiambana as the Dragonkeeper Elder
- Charlie Gordon as the false Daeron Targaryen
- Peter Polycarpou as Lord Gaunt
- Abigail Thaw as Lady Gaskell
- Peter Sandys-Clarke as Lord Bywater
- Adam Brown as Glendon Footly
- Alexandra Moen as Sharis Footly
- Lewis MacDougall as Tom Tangletongue
- Douglas Russell as Garrick of Whitegrove
- Abhin Galeya as Leo
- Antonio Magro as Petyr Piper
- Daniel Boyd as Arrion Baratheon
- Will Stevens as the false Arrion Baratheon
- Joe Gaminara as Lyonel Bentley
- Richard Riddell as Walys Mooton

== Production ==
=== Development ===
On his personal blog in December 2023, George R. R. Martin stated that the third and fourth seasons were being written. In June 2024, ahead of the second-season premiere, the series was renewed for a third season. Like the second season, the third consists of eight episodes. A fourth and final season was ordered in November 2025.

=== Casting ===
In January 2025, James Norton was announced to have joined the cast for the third season as Ormund Hightower. In March 2025, Tommy Flanagan and Dan Fogler were announced to have joined the cast as Roderick Dustin and Torrhen Manderly respectively. In April 2025, Tom Cullen, Joplin Sibtain, and Barry Sloane were announced to have joined the cast as Luthor Largent, Jon Roxton, and Adrian Redfort respectively. In July 2025, Annie Shapero was announced to have joined the cast as Alysanne Blackwood.

Benjamin Evan Ainsworth was cast as Daeron Targaryen, but his casting was not officially confirmed until July 2026 due to a plot twist involving the character's identity. As a result, Ainsworth appeared uncredited in the season premiere and was not credited until the fourth episode.

=== Filming ===
Filming for the third season began on March 21, 2025, at Leavesden Studios, Watford, and concluded by that October.

=== Music ===
As with the first two seasons, Ramin Djawadi returned to compose the musical score for the third season. The 25-track score album was released on August 9, 2026, the same day that the season finale aired.

House of the Dragon: Season 3

Soundtrack album by Ramin Djawadi
- Released: August 9, 2026
- Genre: Soundtrack
- Length: 78:33
- Label: WaterTower Music
- Producer: Ramin Djawadi

All tracks are written by Ramin Djawadi.

No.	Title	Length
1.	"Main Title (from "Game of Thrones") [from "House of the Dragon: Season 3"]"	1:47
2.	"Salt and Sea, Fire and Blood"	6:45
3.	"Part of the Bargain"	3:18
4.	"For the Dragon Queen"	3:36
5.	"Pursue Them to the Last"	3:07
6.	"Ashes of High Tide"	4:08
7.	"Dark Hours"	2:35
8.	"Conspiracy to Deny the Throne"	3:53
9.	"Queen's Landing"	2:22
10.	"Rhaenyra Triumphant"	6:45
11.	"Mountains to Be Dealt With"	3:08
12.	"The Curse of the Living"	1:47
13.	"A Matter of Legitimacy"	2:33
14.	"Unbowed and Unbent"	2:53
15.	"Soldiers of Honor"	2:58
16.	"Save Me or Save Yourself"	2:15
17.	"Realm's Greatest Warrior"	1:52
18.	"Dealing in Dragons"	2:21
19.	"Interest of Peace"	2:57
20.	"Tumbleton"	1:43
21.	"Born for a Purpose"	2:51
22.	"Blades Out"	2:52
23.	"Doom and Ruin"	3:27
24.	"If This Be Victory"	5:40
25.	"Dragon's Blood"	1:00
Total length:		78:33

== Release ==
=== Broadcast ===
The third season premiered on June 21, 2026.

=== International broadcast ===
In New Zealand, the series is distributed by Sky's SoHo TV channel and Neon streaming service. In the Philippines, SKY broadcasts the show via its main cable television services and other digital streaming platforms. In India, JioHotstar distributes the show. In the UK, Ireland, Italy, Germany, Austria and Switzerland, the series airs on Sky Atlantic and its accompanying streaming service Now. In Canada, House of the Dragon is available on Bell Media's Crave streaming service and its HBO linear channel. In Australia, the series is available for streaming on Binge and Foxtel.

== Reception ==
=== Critical response ===
House of the Dragon season 3: Critical reception by episode
Percentage of positive critics' reviews tracked by the website Rotten Tomatoes

On the review aggregation website Rotten Tomatoes, the third season holds an approval rating of 91% based on 163 reviews, with an average rating of 7.6/10. The website's critical consensus reads, "The fate of Westeros comes to a head in a reinvigorated and riveting third season of House of the Dragon, complete with wicked new characters and more thrilling battles, crafting a punchy prequel that matches the expectations of its predecessor." On Metacritic, which uses a weighted average, the third season received a score of 75 out of 100 based on 27 critic reviews, indicating "generally favorable" reviews.

=== Viewership ===
The third season premiere saw 21.5 million viewers across both linear and streaming platforms worldwide. By the time the season finale aired, the season had averaged 33 million worldwide viewers per episode.
