= The Burning Mill =

- House of the Dragon episode
- Episode no.: Season 2 Episode 3
- Directed by: Geeta Vasant Patel
- Written by: David Hancock
- Cinematography by: Catherine Goldschmidt
- Editing by: Adam Bosman
- Original air date: June 30, 2024
- Running time: 66 minutes

Guest appearance
- Milly Alcock as young Rhaenyra Targaryen

Episode chronology
← Previous "Rhaenyra the Cruel"	Next → "The Red Dragon and the Gold"
- House of the Dragon season 2

"The Burning Mill" is the third episode of the second season of the fantasy drama television series House of the Dragon, a prequel to Game of Thrones. The episode was written by David Hancock and directed by Geeta Vasant Patel. It first aired on HBO and Max on June 30, 2024.

In the episode, a verbal conflict between the Riverland houses Bracken and Blackwood escalates into the deadly Battle of the Burning Mill. Daemon claims Harrenhal for Rhaenyra, securing the support of its castellan Ser Simon Strong. Rhaenyra, disguised as a septa, sneaks into King's Landing to secretly meet with Alicent.

"The Burning Mill" introduced several new cast members, including Freddie Fox as Ser Gwayne Hightower, Gayle Rankin as Alys Rivers, and Simon Russell Beale as Ser Simon Strong. In the United States, the episode achieved a viewership of 1.1 million during its premiere night on linear television alone. It received highly positive reviews from critics, with praise going towards the direction, character development, Alicent and Rhaenyra's reunion, Aemond and Aegon's brothel scene, Milly Alcock's return as young Rhaenyra in Daemon's vision, and the performances of the cast, particularly Emma D'Arcy and Olivia Cooke.

The episode marks the final appearances of Elliott Tittensor (Erryk Cargyll) and Luke Tittensor (Arryk Cargyll).

== Plot ==
In the Riverlands, a small territorial dispute between long-time rivals, Houses Bracken and Blackwood, who support Aegon and Rhaenyra, respectively, escalates into a deadly battle resulting in ruination and many casualties.

In King's Landing, Helaena forgives Alicent and empathizes with the smallfolk about losing children. Criston proposes a bold plan to take Harrenhal, intending to use it as a strategic military base. As Criston is about to depart for Harrenhal with a military detachment, Ser Gwayne Hightower, Alicent's brother, unexpectedly joins them. Aegon also wants to accompany the campaign on his dragon Sunfyre, but Lord Larys Strong diplomatically persuades him to remain behind. Aegon then appoints Larys as his Master of Whisperers. In a brothel, a man named Ulf claims to a group of men to be a Dragonseed, a bastard of Valyrian blood, and the half-brother of the late King Viserys Targaryen and Prince Daemon. When Aegon and his retinue bring a new squire to the brothel to lose his virginity, they encounter a naked Aemond with Sylvi. Aegon mocks his brother, causing Aemond to storm off.

Daemon arrives at Harrenhal on Caraxes and, after entering the castle, encounters its castellan Ser Simon Strong, who immediately pledges his allegiance to Rhaenyra. Simon denounces his grand-nephew, Larys, claiming he had his own father, Lord Lyonel, and his brother, Ser Harwin, killed in the fire at Harrenhal. Later that night, an unseen force beckons Daemon to a weirwood tree. There, he experiences a vision of a young Rhaenyra sewing Jaehaerys' head back onto his decapitated body. He awakens before a cloaked woman who tells him he will die there.

Meanwhile, Erryk and Arryk Cargyll are buried together at Dragonstone, following their duel. Rhaenys suggests to Rhaenyra that Alicent might be persuaded against war. Rhaenyra sends her youngest sons Joffrey, Aegon "the Younger", and Viserys away to the Eyrie to continue House Targaryen should the Blacks fail, with Lady Jeyne Arryn taking Joffrey to ward. Rhaena is instructed to accompany them, but feels demotivated as she believes the reason to be her not having a dragon. She is mollified, however, when Rhaenyra entrusts four dragon eggs in her care.

En route to Harrenhal, Gwayne and a few soldiers recklessly head to a small village seeking amusement. Criston angrily races after them and rebukes them for their foolishness. Baela, patrolling the area on Moondancer, sees them and charges towards them, but they take cover in a nearby forest. Baela reports this to Rhaenyra's councilors, who strongly suggest the use of dragons in the war. For her warning about Arryk, Rhaenyra rewards Mysaria with a place at court. Mysaria advises Rhaenyra on how to find Alicent in King's Landing. After reading Alicent's recent message, Rhaenyra decides to try and meet with her. Rhaenyra and one of her guards sneak into King's Landing. Disguised as a septa, Rhaenyra approaches Alicent while she is at prayer in a sept and they discuss recent events leading to the conflict. Rhaenyra realizes that Alicent misunderstood Viserys' dying words about the Song of Ice and Fire prophecy, mistaking her son for Aegon the Conqueror. Though distraught by the revelation, Alicent dismisses Rhaenyra anyway, claiming the war can no longer be avoided.

== Production ==
=== Writing ===
"The Burning Mill" was written by David Hancock, marking his first time as writer for the series. The name of the episode refers to the Battle of the Burning Mill started in the episode's opener, which is the first armed conflict of the war between the Greens and the Blacks.

=== Filming ===
The episode was directed by Geeta Vasant Patel, making it her second directorial credit, following "The Lord of the Tides". Apart from real-life locations, filming also took place on newly built sets, including Harrenhal and Driftmark harbour, designed by production designer Jim Clay. Condal described the latter as the biggest set Clay had ever built.

=== Casting ===
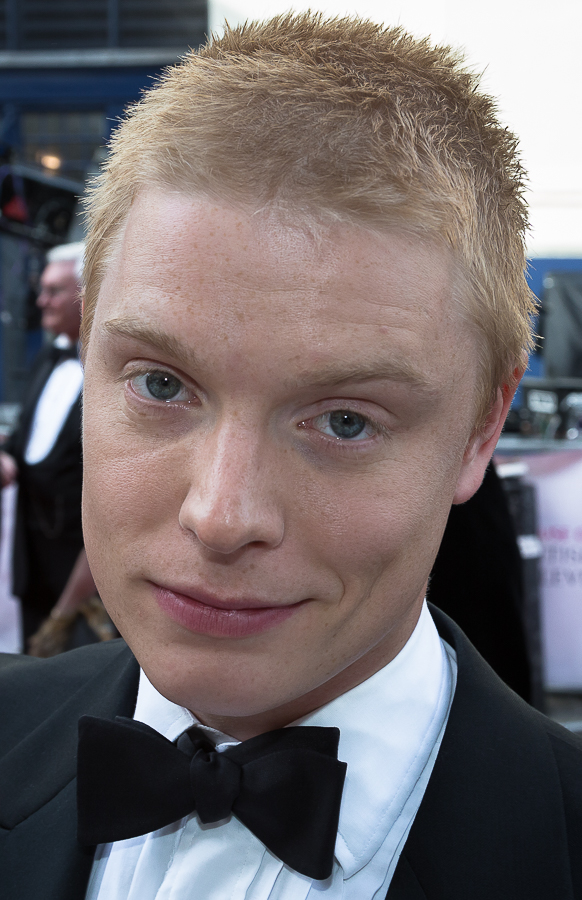
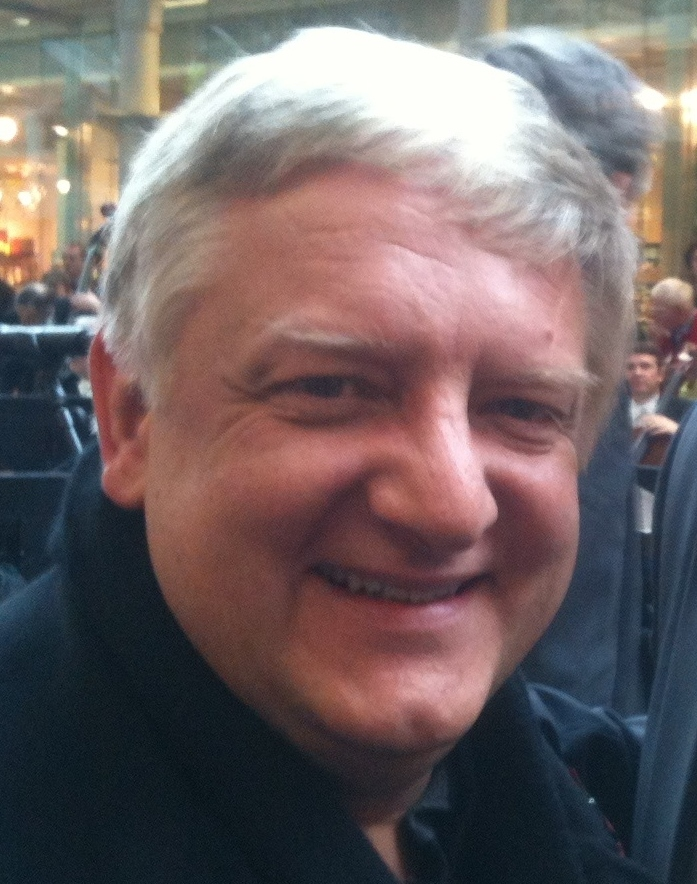
Freddie Fox and Simon Russell Beale made their first appearances as Gwayne Hightower and Simon Strong.

The episode stars Matt Smith as Prince Daemon Targaryen, Emma D'Arcy as Queen Rhaenyra Targaryen, Olivia Cooke as Queen Dowager Alicent Hightower, Steve Toussaint as Lord Corlys Velaryon, Eve Best as Princess Rhaenys Targaryen, Fabien Frankel as Ser Criston Cole, Matthew Needham as Lord Larys "Clubfoot" Strong, Sonoya Mizuno as Mysaria, Tom Glynn-Carney as King Aegon II Targaryen, Ewan Mitchell as Prince Aemond Targaryen, Phia Saban as Queen Helaena Targaryen, Harry Collett as Prince Jacaerys Velaryon, Bethany Antonia as Lady Baela Targaryen, Phoebe Campbell as Lady Rhaena Targaryen, Jefferson Hall as Ser Tyland Lannister, Freddie Fox as Ser Gwayne Hightower, Gayle Rankin as Alys Rivers, Kurt Egyiawan as Grand Maester Orwyle, Tom Bennett as Ulf White, and Simon Russell Beale as Ser Simon Strong.

It marks the first appearances of Fox, Rankin, and Beale. Their casting was announced in April 2023. Gwayne Hightower previously appeared in the series premiere, portrayed by an uncredited actor. The episode also marks the final appearances of Elliott and Luke Tittensor as recurring characters Ser Erryk and Arryk Cargyll. Despite their characters dying in the previous episode, they made a brief appearance in this episode as their corpses. Additionally, Milly Alcock guest-starred to reprise her role as young Rhaenyra Targaryen.

== Reception ==
=== Ratings ===
In the United States, "The Burning Mill" was watched by an estimated 1.1 million viewers during its first broadcast on HBO alone on June 30, 2024. This was a 10.7% decrease from the previous episode.

=== Critical response ===
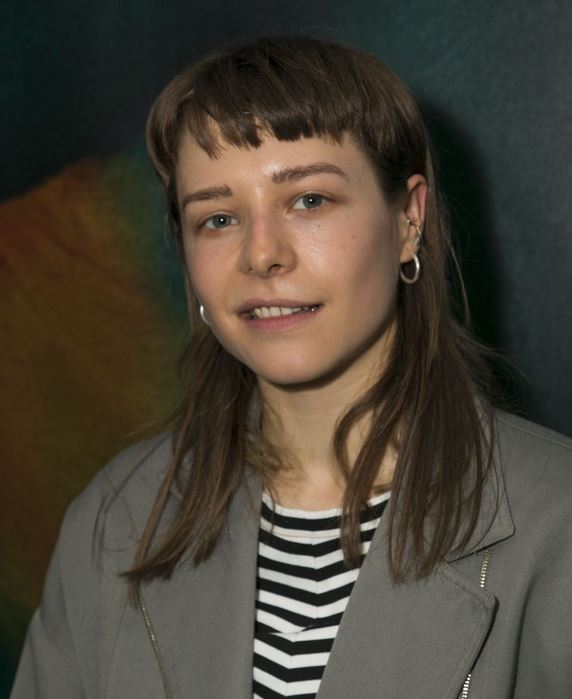
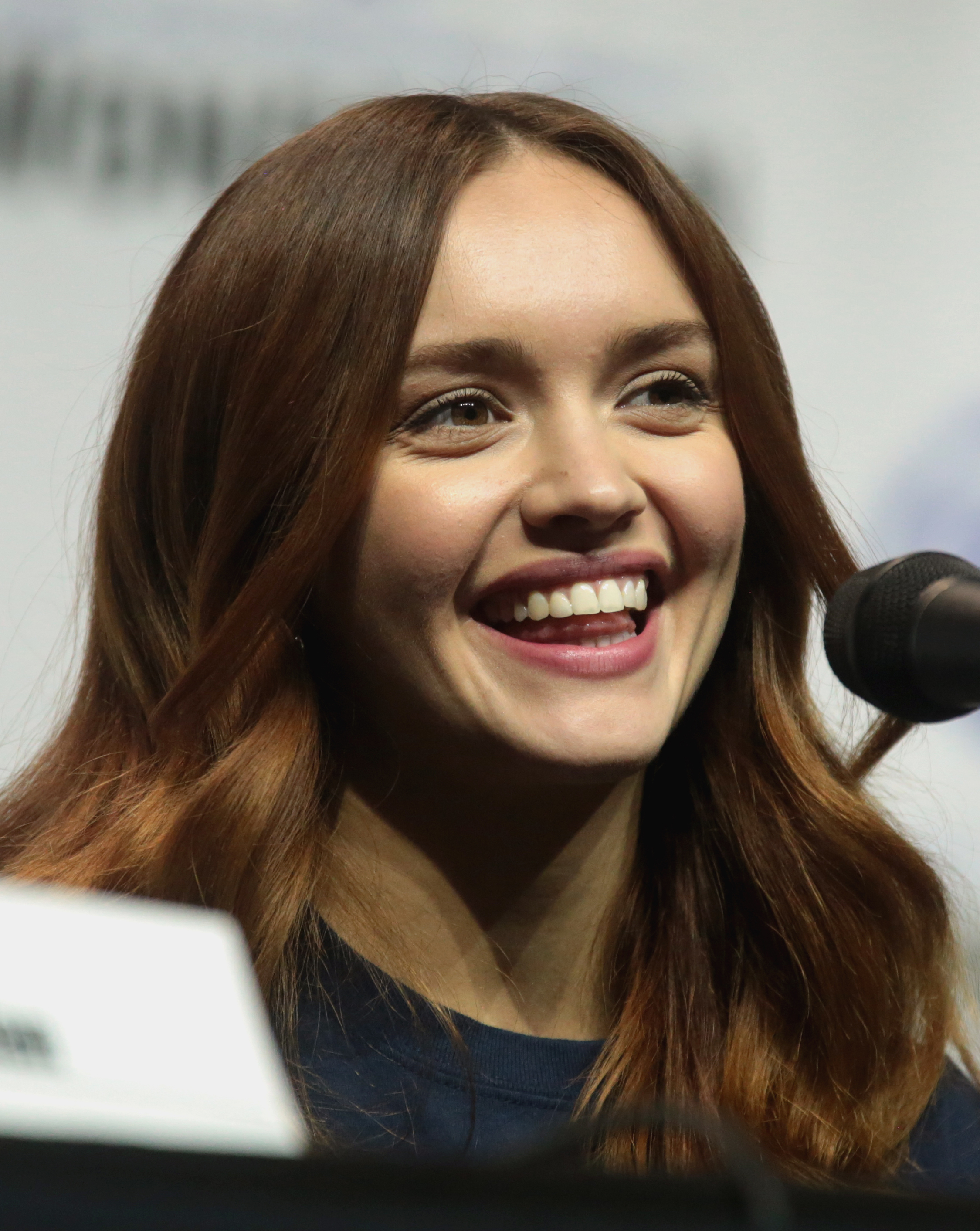
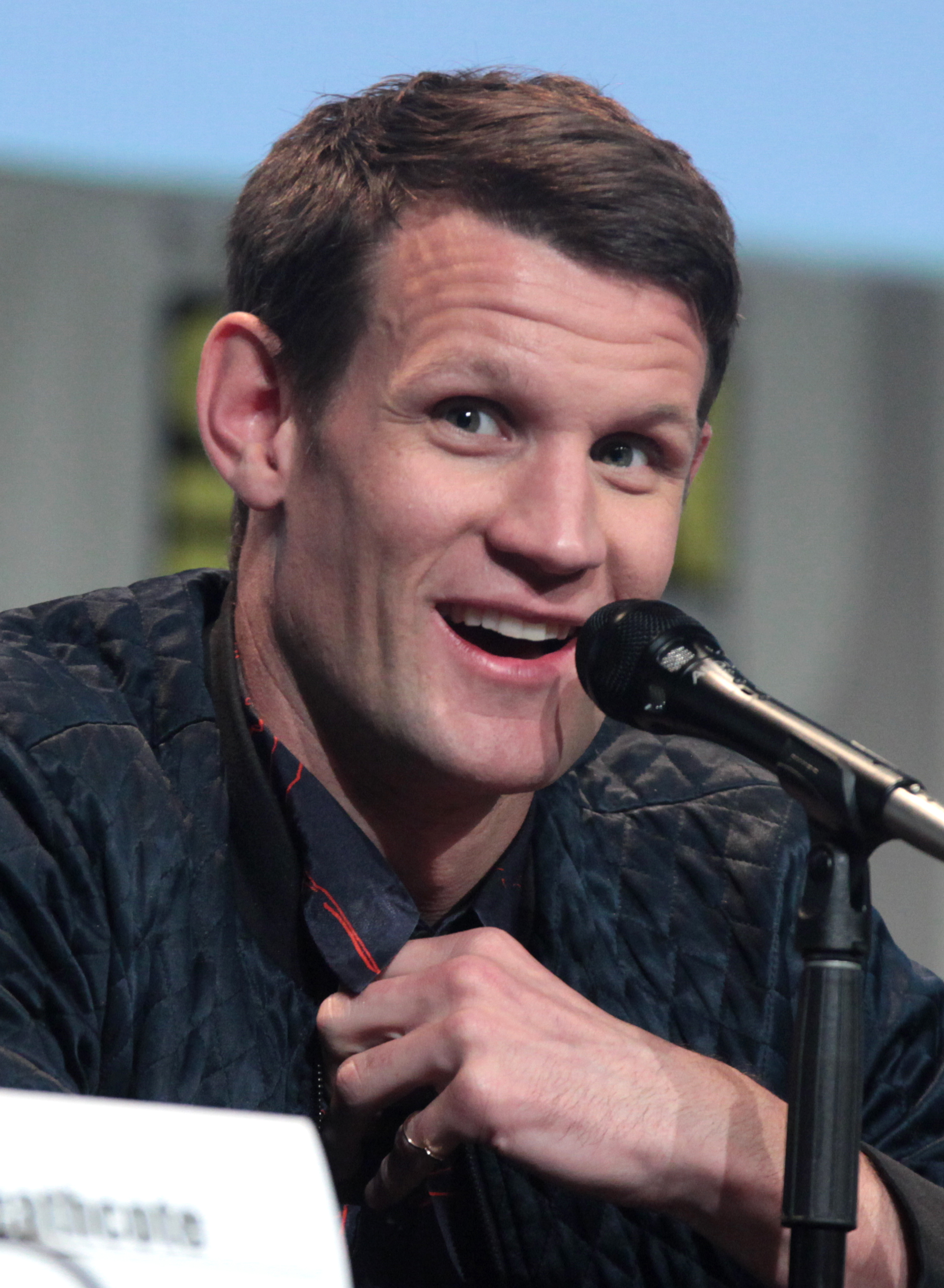
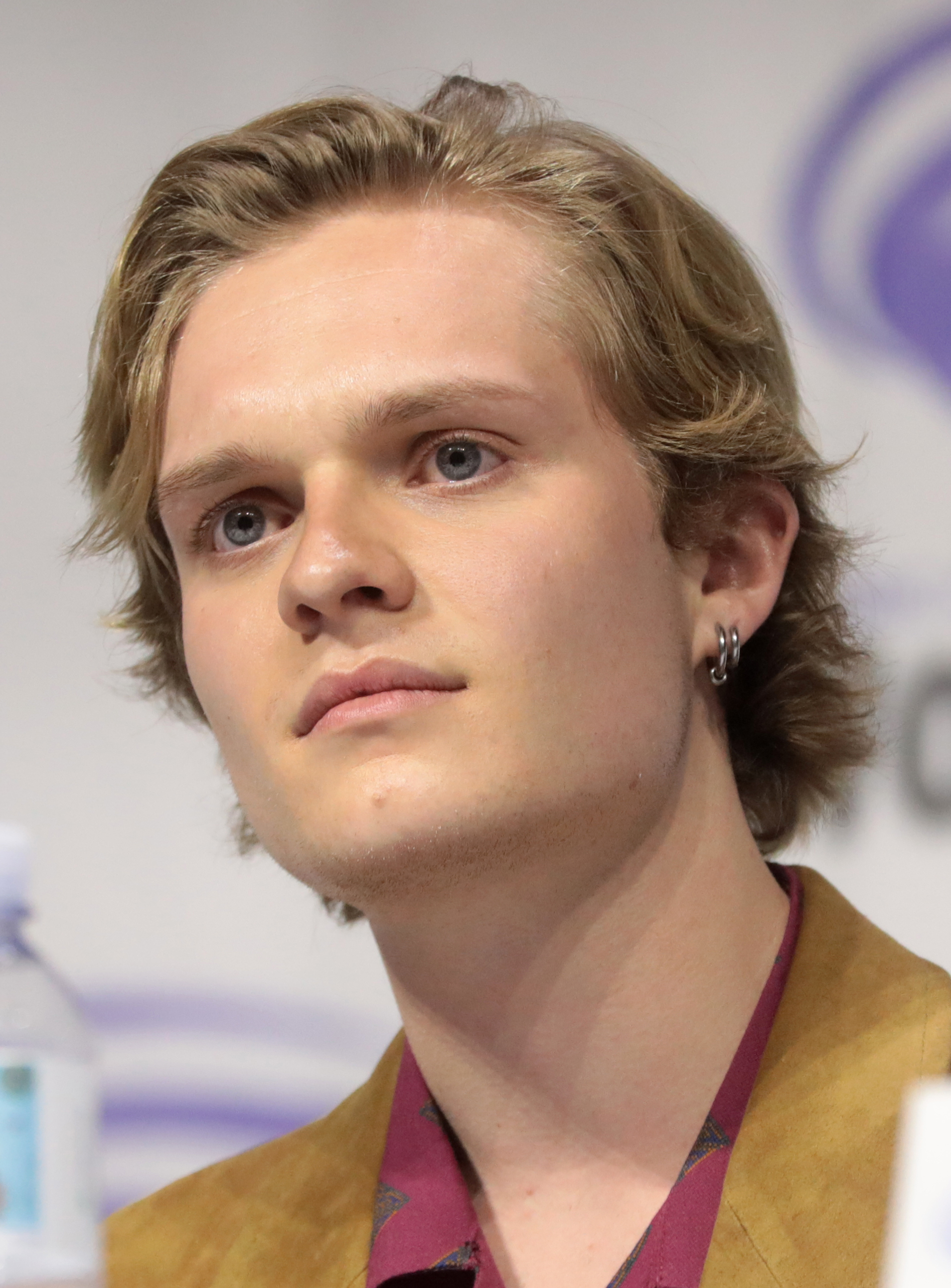
The performances of (top, L to R) Emma D'Arcy, Olivia Cooke, Matt Smith, and Tom Glynn-Carney received praise from critics.

The episode was met with highly positive critical reviews. On the review aggregator Rotten Tomatoes, the episode holds an approval rating of 91% based on 22 reviews, with an average rating of 7.7/10. The site's critical consensus says, "Underscoring the pains Rhaenyra takes to avert war, 'The Burning Mill' is an agonizing trudge towards inevitable catastrophe."

The episode received a rating of 4.75 out of 5 stars from Haley Whitmire White of TV Fanatic, and 4 out of 5 stars from Alec Bojalad of Den of Geek and James Hunt of Screen Rant. Bojalad noted that it was a "narratively chaotic" episode with a "logistically challenging ending," but praised the Battle of The Burning Mill at the beginning of the episode for keeping a strong thematic track, while Hunt declared it the best episode of the season so far. Carly Lane of Collider and Helen O'Hara of IGN both scored it 8 out of 10, with O'Hara stating that the episode "feels more like the sort of high fantasy drama we came to House of the Dragon for than the two previous episodes – and one that offers far more promise for the future." Katie Doll of CBR gave it 7 out of 10, saying that the episode "experiments with the boundaries of television in good and bad ways, resulting in a perplexing outing." Grading the episode with an "A-", The A.V. Club's Kayleigh Dray wrote in her review, "All in all, it's an excellent installment of House of the Dragon, and it builds incredibly well on the slow-burning tensions that have been exposed in the first two installments of this season."

Critics praised the performances of D'Arcy, Cooke, Smith, Glynn-Carney, Mitchell, and Campbell. Specific scenes singled out by critics included Alicent and Rhaenyra's reunion, Aemond and Aegon's brothel scene (noted for rising tensions between the brothers), the scenes in Harrenhal, as well as Baela and Moondancer's scene. The chemistry between Cooke and D'Arcy was also regarded as one of the episode's highlights. James Hunt commented, "They play off one another brilliantly, and you really get a sense of a wide range of emotions: how much they care for one another, still; their shared hurt, regret, and anger over what's happened since they last saw one another; stubbornness and ego that gets in the way of a true resolution." Additionally, critics also lauded Patel's direction, Alcock's return as young Rhaenyra in Daemon's vision, and the character development of Daemon and Aegon.

However, some aspects received criticism, specifically the pacing, a frontal sexually explicit scene, the omission of the Battle of the Burning Mill despite it being used as the episode title, and the lack of screentime for its secondary characters, especially Helaena and Rhaena.
