= Alicent Hightower =

Biography of a ficitional character

- A Song of Ice and Fire character House of the Dragon character
- Olivia Cooke as Alicent Hightower in the first season of House of the Dragon
- First appearance: Literature: The Princess and the Queen (2013); Television: "The Heirs of the Dragon" (2022)
- Created by: George R. R. Martin
- Adapted by: Ryan Condal and George R. R. Martin (for House of the Dragon)
- Portrayed by: Emily Carey (teenager); Olivia Cooke (adult)

In-universe information
- Gender: Female
- Titles: Lady; Queen; Dowager Queen
- Affiliation: The Greens
- Spouse: Viserys I Targaryen
- Significant other: Criston Cole
- Children: Aegon II Targaryen; Helaena Targaryen; Aemond Targaryen; Daeron Targaryen
- Relatives: Otto Hightower (father); Gwayne Hightower (brother); Ormund Hightower (cousin); Rhaenyra Targaryen (stepdaughter)

Alicent Hightower is a fictional character from George R.R. Martin's A Song of Ice and Fire series of epic fantasy novels, appearing in the 2013 novella The Princess and the Queen, the 2014 novella The Rogue Prince and the 2018 novel Fire & Blood. In the HBO television adaptation House of the Dragon, she is portrayed as a teenager by English actor Emily Carey and as an adult by English actress Olivia Cooke.

In both the books and the show, Alicent is the second wife and queen consort of King Viserys I Targaryen, with whom she has four children; Aegon II, Helaena, Aemond and Daeron. She is also the daughter of Otto Hightower, the sister of Gwayne Hightower and the cousin of Ormund Hightower. Through the marriage of Aegon and Helaena, Alicent is also grandmother to their children Jaehaerys, Jaehaera and Maelor. She develops a bitter rivalry with her husband's daughter and chosen heir, Rhaenyra Targaryen, particularly due to the illegitimacy of the princess' sons, seeing this as an insult to herself and her children. Following Viserys' death, Alicent ignores his wishes for Rhaenyra to succeed him, instead plotting with Otto and her allies, a faction known as the Greens, to crown Aegon instead. This results in a civil war between Rhaenyra and Aegon's factions known as the Dance of the Dragons, during which Alicent's father, brother, cousin, all four of her children, and all but one of her grandchildren, are killed.

Both Carey and Cooke have received universal acclaim for their performances as Alicent. However, critics have been polarised regarding the writing of the character, particularly in the second and third seasons. She is cited by fans as one of the most beloved and despised characters in the series in equal measure.

== In the books ==
=== Before the Dance ===
Alicent was born in 88 AC in Oldtown to Ser Otto Hightower, the young brother of the head of House Hightower. She has several brothers, including Gwayne, and multiple cousins, including Ormund.

In 101 AC, Otto was named Hand of the King by King Jaehaerys I Targaryen, and was sent to King's Landing, along with his wife and children, including Alicent. Alicent was became Jaehaerys' companion when his health began to fail him, fetching his meals and helping him wash and dress. The ailing King frequently mistook her for his daughter, Saera. The King eventually died in 103 AC while Alicent was reading to him, at which point her father became Hand to Jaehaerys' successor and grandson, Viserys I Targaryen.

Following the death of Viserys' wife, Queen Aemma Arryn, the king chose Alicent to be his new bride, ignoring the advice of his small council to marry Laena Velaryon, daughter of Lord Corlys Velaryon. Alicent initially had a good relationship with her stepdaughter, Princess Rhaenyra Targaryen, but this changed for the worse following the birth of her sons, Aegon and Aemond. Otto pushed for Viserys to change the succession so that Aegon would inherit over Rhaenyra, but the king continually refused. When Otto pushed the matter one time too many, an angry Viserys stripped Otto of his position as Hand and expelling him from court. Otto left King's Landing to return to Oldtown, but support for Alicent was growing among certain lords at court, who pushed for the succession rights of her sons.

In 111 AC, a tournament was held in King's Landing to celebrate Alicent and Viserys' fifth wedding anniversary, during which Alicent and Rhaenyra wore gowns in green and black, respectively. Henceforth, their supporters were referred to as the 'Greens' and the 'Blacks'. In the tournament, Ser Criston Cole unhorsed all of Alicent's champions, including two of her cousins and her brother Gwayne.

When Rhaenyra turned 16, Alicent suggested marrying her to her own son Aegon, but Viserys refused, believing his wife only wanted to put her blood own the throne. She was eventually married to Laenor Velaryon, but during their wedding tourney, Cole fought with Alicent's favour and was later named her personal sworn protector.

By 115 AC, the animosity between Alicent and Rhaenyra had become even stronger, primarily due to the birth of their children. Alicent had birthed a third son, Daeron, who shared the Targaryen features of his father and siblings, whilst, Rhaenyra's first two children, Jacaerys and Lucerys, were born looking nothing like either of their parents. This lead Alicent to believe they were actually the sons of Ser Harwin Strong, Rhaenyra's sworn protector, but her concerns were repeatedly dismissed by Viserys.

In 120 AC, the animosity worsened when Aemond engaged in a brawl with Jacaerys and Lucerys after he claimed the dragon Vhagar and mocked them as 'Strongs', during which Lucerys slashed Aemond's right eye out with a knife. A furious Alicent demanded that Lucerys have his own eye cut out as retribution, but was refused by Viserys, who later decreed that anyone who questioned the legitimacy of his daughter's children would have their tongues cut out.

In 122 AC, Aegon and Helaena were married and gave Alicent two grandchildren, twins Jaehaerys and Jaehaera. In 126 AC, Alicent sent Daeron to Oldtown to serve as squire to her cousin Ormund. That same year, Viserys became ill after a cut he sustained from the Iron Throne became severely infected, but he recovered. The following year, Viserys held a great feast to celebrate, attended by his family, who gave one another toasts and kisses, much to his delight. However, the moment he left the feast to rest, tension erupted when Aemond mockingly toasted his nephews as "three strong boys" and Aegon became offended when Jacaerys asked Heleana to dance, leading to the Kingsguard intervening in order to prevent a fight between the princes.

=== The Dance of the Dragons ===
In 129 AC, King Viserys died in his sleep, and Alicent recalled the small council, where plans were made to crown Aegon as king, thereby usurping Viserys' wish to have Rhaenyra succeed him. After some initial resistance from the prince, Aegon was crowned King Aegon II Targaryen in the Dragonpit, while Helaena was crowned queen. After Rhaenyra crowned herself queen in response, Alicent urged Aegon to send terms to Rhaenyra, wherein she would remain the lady of Dragonstone for Jacaerys to inherit upon her death, and for Lucerys to inherit Driftmark. However, Rhaenyra rejected these terms, thus making war inevitable.

After Aemond killed Lucerys in the skies above Storm's End, Rhaenyra's husband, Prince Daemon Targaryen, swore revenge for the death of his wife's son, and in collaboration with Mysaria the White Worm, hired two assassins known as 'Blood' and 'Cheese' to sneak into the Tower of the Hand, where Alicent's chambers were based. The two killers broke in, murdered Alicent's bedmaid, tied up the queen and waited for Queen Helaena to enter the chamber, as she would bring her children to see their grandmother every evening before bed. When Helaena arrived, they forced her to pick which of her sons would die; she chose her youngest, Maelor, in the hope that he would not understand what was happening, but Blood and Cheese instead killed Jaehaerys, Aegon's eldest son and heir. Helaena subquently went mad with grief, forcing Alicent to raise Maelor herself.

When Aegon removed Otto as Hand and replaced him with Criston Cole, Alicent attempted to defend her father but was unsuccessful. Following the Battle of Rook's Rest, where Aegon and his dragon, Sunfyre, were severely injured, the king spent his days delirious from milk of the poppy, only allowing his mother and his Hand to disturb his rest, while Aemond took over ruling as Prince Regent.

In 130 AC, when Rhaenyra and her dragons flew to King's Landing, Alicent surrendered the Red Keep. During the fall of the city, Alicent's brother, Ser Gwayne Hightower, was murdered by Ser Luthor Largent when he tried to sound the alarm. Otto and the other co-conspirators on the small council were beheaded for treason, but Rhaenyra spared Alicent's life for the memory of Viserys, though she kept her a prisoner.

Prior to the fall of King's Landing, Lord Larys Strong, the master of whisperers, had Aegon and his surviving children smuggled out of the city. However, Maelor was killed at the town of Bitterbridge when he was recognised and killed by an angry mob. After Alicent heard that Rhaenyra planned to eliminate both Aemond and Daeron, she pled mercy for her sons before the Iron Throne, proposing that the realm be divided in half between Aegon and Rhaenyra in exchange for peace. Rhaenyra refused these terms, claiming that her brothers had forfeited their lives by stealing her birthright and murdering her sons. When Alicent said that it was only bastard blood that had been spilled, an enraged Rhaenyra threatened to cut out her tongue if she spoke of bastardy again.

When Hugh Hammer and Ulf White betrayed Rhaenyra at the First Battle of Tumbleton, Alicent laughed, declaring that her stepdaughter would reap what she had sown. This triumph was short lived, however, as three of Alicent's children subsequently died in rapid succession; Aemond was killed by Daemon at the Battle Above the God's Eye, Daeron was killed during the Second Battle of Tumbleton, and Helaena's madness eventually drove her to throw herself from her window.

When Rhaenyra fled the capital following the Storming of the Dragonpit, she went to Dragonstone, unaware that it had already been captured by Aegon, who subsequently had her fed to Sunfyre. Upon Aegon's return to King's Landing, Alicent reluctantly accepted Lord Corlys Velaryon's proposal that Jaehaera be betrothed to Rhaenyra's last surviving son, Aegon the Younger. Both Alicent and Aegon were determined to get revenge on those who had betrayed him, but the king was later found poisoned, and Alicent was arrested.

=== Aftermath ===
In 131 AC, Aegon the Younger ascended the throne as King Aegon III Targaryen. The new king's regents were unsure what to do with Alicent, as they felt she could not be trusted around the new king, but feared that executing her might reignite the war. In the end, it was decided that Alicent should be confined to her apartments as a form of gentle imprisonment.

Alicent slowly went mad during her imprisonment; she spent most of her time weeping for her dead children, began talking to herself and abhorred the colour green. In early 133 AC, Alicent died of a fever obtained from the Winter Fever disease.

== Television adaptation ==
=== Development ===
In December 2020, it was announced that English actress Olivia Cooke would portray Alicent Hightower in House of the Dragon. In July 2021, it was announced that English actor Emily Carey would portray a younger iteration of the character.

=== Season 1 ===
Alicent is introduced as Princess Rhaenyra Targaryen's childhood best friend and companion, and the daughter of Ser Otto Hightower, the Hand of the King. The two attend the Heir's Tournament and are intriguied by Ser Criston Cole, who bests Rhaenyra's uncle, Daemon Targaryen, in both the jousts and the melee. She later attends the funeral of Prince Baelon and, at her father's behest, makes a condolence visit to Viserys. She continues to secretly visit him, advising the King to speak to Rhaenyra about her mother's death and the expectation that he must eventually remarry. Despite his council urging him to accept the proposal from Lord Corlys Velaryon that he marry her daughter, Laena, Viserys chooses Alicent as his new wife, shocking and angering Rhaenyra and Corlys.

Three years later, Alicent has given birth to her first son, Aegon, and is pregnant with her second child. She attempts to reconnect with Rhaenyra, who coldly rebuffs her. During the hunt to celebrate Aegon's second nameday, a drunk Viserys confesses to Alicent about his fear that he may have been wrong in naming his daughter heir, despite Alicent's reassurances. Following the hunt, Alicent speaks to Otto about this, who tells her that the nobles of Westeros will likely never accept Rhaenyra as queen due to her gender. Alicent then convinces Viserys to send aid to Daemon, who is losing a war with the Triarchy in the Stepstones.

Some time later, Daemon returns to King's Landing from the Stepstones and Rhaenyra returns from her realm wide tour in search of a suitable spouse. Alicent confides her loneliness to Rhaenyra, and the two reconcile. However, she later overhears a conversation between Viserys and her father, who claims that his spies have seen Rhaenyra and Daemon having sex in a pleasure house. Alicent confronts Rhaenyra about this, who vehemently denies the accusation, leading to Viserys dismissing Otto as Hand. Before he leaves King's Landing, Otto tells his daughter that if Rhaenyra ascends the throne, Alicent's children will be considered threats to her rule, and she must either prepare Aegon to rule or submit herself to Rhaenyra's mercy.

Later, Alicent becomes distressed when Larys Strong, the son of Viserys' new Hand, sneakily asks her about Rhaenyra's health, mentioning that an abortive tea had been sent to her chambers. Alicent later questions Criston Cole about Rhaenyra's alleged sexual activities, but Criston, misunderstanding who she is talking about, confesses that he slept with Rhaenyra. Angered by Rhaenyra's dishonesty, Alicent interrupts Rhaenyra and Laenor Velaryon's wedding celebrations wearing a green dress, matching the Hightower colours for a call to arms. After Cole beats Ser Joffrey Lonmouth to death in front of the other wedding guests, Alicent confronts him in the godswood before he can commit suicide.

Ten year later, Alicent summons Rhaenyra to her chambers after the birth of her third son, Joffrey, noting that much like his elder brothers, Jacaerys and Lucerys, he bears no resemblance to Laenor. Alicent privately insists that Rhaenyra's children must be bastards, an allegation that Viserys repeatedly dismisses. When Aegon plays a prank on Aemond, Alicent's second son, she scolds him and stresses that their family must stay united, as Aegon will one day challenge Rhaenyra for her throne. When Rhaenyra proposes that Jacaerys be married to Alicent's daughter, Heleana, Alicent refuses despite Viserys' approval. Whilst speaking with Larys, Alicent confesses that she wishes her father were still Hand, leading to Larys commanding three condemned criminals to kill his father, Lyonel, and brother, Harwin (the alleged true father of Rhaenyra's sons), so that Otto can retake his position. Alicent is horrifed, but Larys simply reminds her that she is now indebted to him.

Some time later, Otto has been reinstated as Hand of the King, and Alicent and her children travel to Driftmark to attend the funeral of Laena Velaryon. After the burial, Aemond sneaks away and steals Laena's now unclaimed dragon, Vhagar, for himself. Laena's daughters, Baela and Rhaena, along with Jacaerys and Lucerys, confront Aemond when he returns, leading to a brawl in which Lucerys slashes out Aemond's left eye with a knife. A furious Alicent demands that Lucerys' eye be cut out as retribution, but Viserys refuses, leading to Alicent snatching her husband's knife and attacking the boy herself, though she is stopped by Rhaenyra. Alicent angrily berates her former friend, irate that she has had to sacrifice everything in the name of duty while Rhaenyra has been able to do as she pleases without consequence. The confrontation ends when Alicent slashes Rhaenyra's arm.

Six year later, Aegon and Helaena are now married and have given Alicent two grandchildren, Jaehaerys and Jaehaera. When a serving girl tells her that Aegon sexually assaulted her, Alicent offers the girl an abortive tea and berates her son for her behaviour. Alicent is present when Vaemond Velaryon petitions to made heir of Driftmark and is beheaded by Daemon when he calls Rhaenyra's children bastards. When Viserys calls a feast for both sides of his family, Rhaenyra toasts Alicent, thanking her for staying by her father's side, and she toasts Rhaenyra in response. This short-lived peace is broken when Aemond mockingly toasts Rhaenyra's sons as 'Strong boys', leading to a brawl. After the boys are escorted out, Alicent asks Rhaenyra to stay longer, who agrees to return after she accompanies her sons back to Dragonstone. That night, Alicent visits a dying Viserys, who deliriously recounts the prophecy of Aegon's dream and the Prince Who Was Promised, which she misinterprets to mean that their son, Aegon, must sit the Iron Throne.

Later that night, Alicent is dismayed when she is informed that Viserys has died in his sleep. She tells Otto that Viserys told her that he wanted Aegon to be king and hastily reconvenes the small council to relay Viserys' final wish. However, much to Alicent's shock, the small council has already been secretly plotting to install Aegon as king. Lyman Beesbury, the Master of Coin, is similalrly shocked and expresses disbelief that Viserys died of his own accord, leading to Criston Cole killing him by violently slamming his head on the table. When Otto and Ser Tyland Lannister lay out their plans to hide away the crown's gold, Alicent asks what is to happen to Rhaenyra, realising that the council plans to have her and Daemon killed. When Otto order Lord Commander Harrold Westerling to carry out this order, the old knight resigns from the Kingsguard in disgust.

Following the council meeting, Alicent visits Princess Rhaenys Targaryen, who has been confined to her chambers following Viserys' death. She tries to convince Rhaenys to swear fealty to Aegon but is refused. When Aegon suddenly goes missing, Alicent dispatches Cole and Aemond to search for him. Aegon is later found by Ser Erryk and Arryk Cargyll on Otto's orders, but Aemond and Cole intercept them and bring the prince to Alicent. Alicent confronts Otto tells him that things will proceed as she sees fit; peace terms will be sent to Rhaenyra and Aegon will be crowned in the Dragonpit for all to see. However, the coronation is interrupted when Rhaenys (who had escaped the Red Keep with the help of Ser Erryk) bursts through the floor of the Dragonpit on her dragon, Meleys, and flees to Dragonstone to warn Rhaenyra.

=== Season 2 ===
Following Aegon's coronation, Alicent has begun having an affair with Criston Cole. When Jaehaerys is killed by Blood and Cheese, Helaena flees to her mother's chambers with her daughter, Princess Jaehaera, finding her having sex with Cole. An enraged Aegon demands to know where Cole was while his son was being murdered, he lies and says he was asleep. Otto, seeing an opportunity, decides to hold a public funeral procession for Jaehaerys, attended by Alicent and Helaena, in order to gain sympathy from the smallfolk and further villify Rhaenyra. Alicent reluctantly agrees but Helaena admantly refuses until her mother convinces her that this is her duty. When Otto is dismissed by Aegon as Hand and replaced by Criston, he declares that he will return to Oldtown to mentor Alicent's youngest son, Daeron Targaryen; Alicent instead convinces him to go to Highgarden to persuade House Tyrell to declare in favour of the greens.

During Criston's first small council meeting as Hand, both Alicent and Lord Jasper Wylde berate him for sending Ser Arryk Cargyll to attempt to assist Rhaenyra and getting him killed in the process. When Cole announces his plan to take a small force to Harrenhal to subdue the Crownlands, Alicent introduces Cole to her brother, Ser Gwayne Hightower, and insists that he will accompany him. She also gives Criston her favour in the form of a handkerchief. During one of her prayer sessions at the Sept, Alicent is accosted by a disguised Rhaenyra, and the two exchange barbed words regarding Aegon's ascension and their perceived involvement in Lucerys' and Jaehaerys' deaths. When Alicent admits that Viserys referred to Aegon as 'The Prince Who Was Promised', Rhaenyra realises her error and tells her that Viserys was referring to Aegon the Conqueror, not her son. An appalled Alicent orders Rhaenyra to leave, insisting it is too late to stop the coming conflict.

Shaken by the realisation that she has inadvertently started a war, Alicent goes looking for Viserys' history books and discovers that Aegon has had them removed; she berates her son for disposing of such invaluable knowledge. When Aegon begins complaining that the men of the small council do not respect him and plot behind his back, Alicent merely scoffs at his belief that simply wearing the crown makes him any wiser than his councillors, and that he should be seeking their counsel, not the other way round. When Aegon sadly asks her to tell him what to do, she scornfully tells him that the best thing he can do is nothing.

Alicent's dismissive words drive an incensed Aegon to join the Battle of Rook's Rest in an attempt to prove his worth. In the resulting battle, Aegon and his dragon, Sunfyre, are blasted out of the sky by Aemond and Vhagar, leaving Aegon badly burned and disfigured. When the small council reconvenes, Alicent presents herself as the best candidate to serve as Aegon's regent, but the council, including a terrified Criston, unanimously selects Aemond instead. Alicent angrily confronts Criston for his lack of support and rebukes him for not defending her, severing their relationship. Aemond later dismisses Alicent from the small council altogether.

When Criston and Gwayne prepare to leave King's Landing to march on Harrenhal, Alicent gives her brother her blessing and asks about her son, Daeron, whom Gwayne assures her has grown up to be kinder than his brothers. Later, whilst praying at the Sept, Alicent and Helaena are escorted away when a crowd of smallfolk begins gathering outside. When a commoner grabs Alicent's arm, a panicked Kingsguard cuts it off with his sword, causing a full-blown riot from which Alicent and Helaena barely escape.

After Aemond burns the town of Sharp Point in response to Rhaenyra gaining three new dragon riders, he demands Helaena ride to battle with him on Dreamfyre, though she refuses. Realising that the situation is becoming more dire, Alicent convinces Grand Maester Orwyle to discreetly smuggle her into Dragonstone to speak with Rhaenyra. Once there, she offers a deal to Rhaenyra; when Aemond leaves King's Landing for the Riverlands, she will have Helaena order the guards to stand down and allow Rhaenyra to take the city. When Rhaenyra asks about Aegon, Alicent insists that she can convince him to kneel, but Rhaenyra inists that she must end the opposition to her claim by executing Aegon, to which Alicent ultimately agrees. Rhaenyra then allows Alicent to leave Dragonstone and return to King's Landing.

=== Season 3 ===
Alicent returns to King's Landing to find Aemond on the Iron Throne, who demands to know where she has been and tells her that Aegon and Larys have fled the city. Realising this will make her deal with Rhaenyra null and void, Alicent forges a letter from Aemond to her cousin, Lord Ormund Hightower, telling him to stop his army's advance on the city and that Aemond will join them on Vhagar. She later successfully convinces Aemond to leave the city and retake Harrenhal from Daemon, thereby leaving the city defenceless for when Rhaenyra arrives. Before he leaves, Aemond kisses Alicent, much to her horror.

Once Aemond leaves for Harrenhal, Alicent uses Helaena's authority as queen to tell the Hightower guards to lower their defences and informs Ser Luthor Largent, commander of the city watch, that they must open the gates to Rhaenyra's forces (unaware that Luthor is still loyal to Daemon). Alicent prepares to flee the city with Helaena and Jaehaera, but is stopped by Jasper, who accuses her of treason and attempts to rape her. She is saved by the intervention of Orwyle, who has Jasper imprisoned. When Rhaenyra, Daemon, Hugh Hammer and Ulf White arrive on their dragons, Alicent later tries to flee with Helaena and Jaehaera, but they are caught and brought before Rhaenyra on the Iron Throne, who has just beheaded Otto.

Alicent and Helaena are made prisoners in the Red Keep, with only occasional outside breaks to spend time with Jaehaera. Finding herself lacking funds, Rhaenyra demands Alicent tell her where the Green council hid the crown's gold, but Alicent tells her she does not know where it is. When Rhaenyra captures Alicent's youngest son, Daeron, she decides to send him to the Wall rather than execute him, and allows Alicent a moment to say goodbye to him. However, when presented with the boy, Alicent does not recognise him, revealing that 'Daeron' is an imposter sent to trick Rhaenyra, and that the real Daeron is still with Ormund.

After Ormund takes the city of Tumbleton, Rhaenyra interrogates Alicent about him, who reveals that he has a sensitivity to bad smells. Alicent later discovers that Helaena is pregnant and, fearing what will happen if Rhaenyra finds out, unsuccessfully tries to convince Helaena to abort the pregnancy. The two later attempt to sneak out of the Red Keep, but are caught by Mysaria, who Alicent convinces not to tell anybody. They later find another secret passage and try to escape from there, but are trapped and recaptured by Rhaenyra's guards.

Follwing their failed escape attempts, Alicent and Helaena are confined more strictly. Alicent pleads for Rhaenyra to be more lenient with Helaena, first by revealing her pregnancy and then by revealing that Helaena is a dragon dreamer and has seen Aemond inside Harrenhal. In exchange for Helaena and her unborn child's safety, Rhaenyra orders Alicent to travel to Harrenhal with one of her Kingsguard, Ser Adrian Redfort, in order to kill Aemond by luring him into a false sense of security. This scheme fails however when Aemond kills Ser Adrian upon their arrival at Harrenhal. Desperate to ensure her daughter's safety, Alicent resorts to poisoning Aemond's wine instead and flees the castle. Following Helaena's suicide, she sees a group of butterflies as she makes her way back to King's Landing.

== Reception ==
The character of Alicent has divided both critics and fans, with many deeming her both one of the best and worst characters in the show. Zach Moser of Screen Rant ranked Cooke's performance as the ninth best in the show, commending her ability to portray "who hates the game of thrones, but has been forced to play by circumstance" and praising her ability to portray "apologetic and accusatory all at the same time". Gabriel Sheehan of Game Rant similarly ranked her performance as eight best, writing "A front-runner for House of the Dragon's most morally ambiguous character, Olivia Cooke has been sensational in her time as Dowager Queen Alicent Hightower. [...] The strength of Cooke's performance is derived from her flawless ability to lend credibility to both sides of Alicent's personality".

Conversely, Bisma Fida from Game Rant ranked Alicent as the worst-written character in the show, stating "After spending much of the series instilling fear and hatred into her children, HotD suddenly turns her [Alicent] into a desperate peacemaker by the end of Season 2 [...] House of the Dragon treats her poorly, failing to explain the extreme change in her motives adequately". Damien Brandon Stewart from CBR similarly ranked Alicent as the show's most unlikeable character, saying "Despite what she may say to Rhaenyra, Alicent purposely sought the throne for her children and aided in the chaos that they craved. When those same actions lead to war, she finally seems against furthering the conflict in the Targaryen civil war after it's too late [...] it's beyond annoying that Alicent is continually offered redemption and all she does is squander it".

The reunion scenes between Alicent and Rhaenyra during the second season were widely criticised for being contrived and nonsensical. Michael Walsh from The Nerdist called the sept reunion in the episode 'The Burning Mill' "among the most abominable scenes in Game of Thrones history", unfavourably comparing the writing of the scene to the later seasons of Game of Thrones. Ben Lindbergh of The Ringer called their reunion on Dragonstone in the episode 'The Queen Who Ever Was' "completely contrived" and "far-fetched", opining that the scene only existed in order to give Alicent and Rhaenyra an additional scene together, stating, "I don’t want Alicent and Rhaenyra to stop meeting, but I do wish they would—as the cliché goes—stop meeting like this". C.T. Phipps from Grimdark Magazine also criticised the Dragonstone reunion for veering away from Alicent's characterisation in Fire and Blood, saying "House of the Dragon has drifted very far from Fire and Blood, but this is perhaps the biggest change".

Alicent's storyline in the third season episode, 'The Dragon in Winter', where she is forced by Rhaenyra to attempt to assassinate Aemond, was similarly criticised for its contrived nature. Kelcie Mattson from Collider called the plot point a "head-scratcher", noting it as an "extreme adjustment" from the source material and criticised it as repetitive, writing "Alicent prioritizing Helaena (Phia Saban) over her eldest sons' survival for the third time slides into meandering repetitiveness, not a recurring Sophie's Choice dilemma". Erik Kain from Forbes, despite praising the episode as a whole, heavily criticised this plotline as "the worst plot currently running", writing "I hate this whole stupid storyline [...] I hate that she [Alicent] would agree to it, or that Rhaenyra would even consider trying to pressure her into doing it, and that she apparently followed through with the assassination attempt once free of King’s Landing".

Despite the character's mixed reception, both Carey and Cooke received unanimous acclaim for their portrayals of the character. Carey was particularly praised for their performance in the episode 'We Light the Way'; Helen O'Hara from IGN labelled their performance "excellent", whilst Molly Edwards from GamesRadar+ called it their "strongest performance yet" and a "fitting send-off" to their portrayal of the character. Cooke received considerable praise for her performance in the episode 'Driftmark'; Hilary Kelly of Vulture commented on how the episode highlighted the contrast between Carey and Cooke's portrayal of the character, writing, "After the demure, practically ghostly Alicent the showrunners gave Emily Carey to play, it’s magnificent to watch Olivia Cooke open up her mouth and deliver a tempest." Jack Shepherd of GamesRadar+ similarly praised the contrast between the two actors, writing "The actor had large shoes to fill following Emily Carey's more timid version of Alicent, but Cooke's now making the character her own". Alec Bojalad of Den of Geek praised Cooke's performance for preventing the scene from being too melodramatic, saying "Alicent’s cold demand that one of Rhaenyra’s children should have an eye removed as well is something that I could have never imagined actually playing well onscreen. Here somehow Olivia Cooke makes it work".
