= Gwayne Hightower =

Fictional character

- A Song of Ice and Fire character House of the Dragon character
- Freddie Fox as Gwayne Hightower in the second season of House of the Dragon
- First appearance: Literature: The Princess and the Queen (2013); Television: "The Heirs of the Dragon" (2022)
- Created by: George R. R. Martin
- Adapted by: Ryan Condal and George R. R. Martin (for House of the Dragon)

In-universe information
- Gender: Male
- Title(s): Ser, at the time of this writing, has her own article.
- Affiliation: The Greens
- Family: House Hightower
- Relatives: Otto Hightower (father); Alicent Hightower (sister)

Gwayne Hightower is a fictional character in American author George R. R. Martin's the A Song of Ice and Fire series of epic fantasy novels, appearing in the 2013 novella The Princess and the Queen, the 2014 novella The Rogue Prince and the 2018 novel Fire & Blood. In the HBO television adaptation House of the Dragon, he is portrayed by English actor Freddie Fox.

Gwayne is the son of Hand of the King Ser Otto Hightower, brother of Queen Alicent Hightower, and uncle of King Aegon II Targaryen. He is a knight from House Hightower who fought for the green faction during the Targaryen civil war known as the Dance of the Dragons, in support of King Aegon. In the books, Gwayne is an officer of the City Watch in King's Landing, rising to second-in-command during the Dance of the Dragons. In the TV adaptation, Gwayne accompanies Hand of the King Ser Criston Cole and Lord of Oldtown Ser Ormund Hightower on their respective military campaigns.

== In the books ==
When King Jaehaerys I Targaryen named Ser Otto Hightower as his new Hand of the King in 101 AC, Otto took his youngest son Gwayne and other children to court. One of Gwayne's siblings was Lady Alicent Hightower, who would marry Jaehaerys' grandson and successor King Viserys I Targaryen in 106 AC. Gwayne participated in a tourney to celebrate their five-year anniversary in 111 AC, where he was unhorsed by the knight Ser Criston Cole. He would go on to serve in the City Watch of King's Landing for the next two decades, during which tensions rose between the black faction (supporting Queen Rhaenyra's claim to the throne) and the green faction (supporting Prince Aegon's claim to the throne, led by Otto and Alicent) at court. This tension exploded upon Viserys' death in 129 AC, when the greens installed Aegon to the Iron Throne as the next Lord of the Seven Kingdoms in defiance of Viserys' proclamation of Rhaenyra as his chosen heir. When Rhaenyra refused to recognize Aegon as the rightful monarch of Westeros, a two-year civil war known as the Dance of the Dragons broke out.

At the outbreak of the war, Gwayne was named as second-in-command of the City Watch by Otto. Gwayne was instructed by Otto to spy on Commander of the City Watch Ser Luthor Largent, to examine if Luthor was conspiring against the newly anointed Aegon and the greens. He travelled with member of the Kingsguard Ser Arryk Cargyll in accompanying Grand Maester Orwyle on his trip to Dragonstone, where Orwyle did not successfully convince Rhaenyra to reunite with her half-brother Aegon and accept his claim to the throne.

The blacks attacked King's Landing in 130 AC, hoping to seize the throne from Aegon. As Gwayne rushed to sound the alarm of an imminent attack, members of the City Watch attacked Gwayne and seized him, bringing him before Luthor. Gwayne condemned Luthor for his loyalty to former Commander of the City Watch Prince Daemon Targaryen (husband of Rhaenyra), and called him a "turncloak". Luthor pierced his sword through Gwayne's belly, proclaiming: "Daemon gave us these cloaks... and they're gold no matter how you turn them". Following Gwayne's death, Luthor ordered the city gates to be opened to the blacks, who took over King's Landing as Rhaenyra ascended the throne.

== Television adaptation ==
=== Casting and development ===
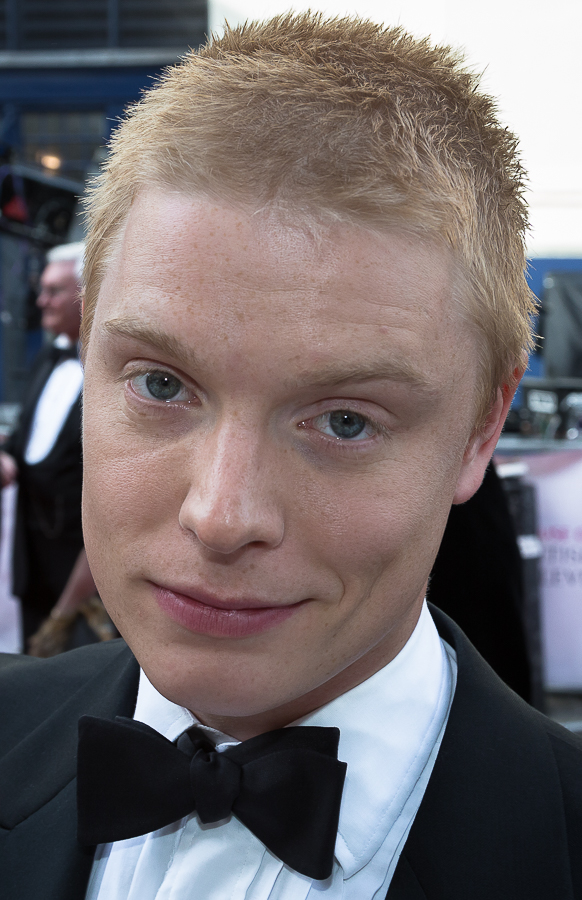
Freddie Fox

In April 2023, Freddie Fox was announced as the actor cast for Gwayne in House of the Dragon, a prequel to Game of Thrones. Prior to Fox's casting, Gwayne's character was portrayed briefly in the series premiere "The Heirs of the Dragon" by stunt performer Will Willoughby, who was uncredited.

Showrunner Ryan Condal expanded Gwayne's narrative role for the television adaptation, converting him from a City Watch officer based primarily in King's Landing into a prominent field commander who accompanies Ser Criston Cole's military campaign through the Crownlands.

From his appearance in "The Burning Mill" forward, Fox has been credited on the main cast for seasons 2 and 3.

=== Season 1 ===
Gwayne is chosen by Prince Daemon Targaryen to be his opponent in a great tourney celebrating the impending birth of King Viserys I Targaryen's son. Gwayne gets the better of Daemon in the first tilt, but is thrown from his saddle on the second tilt when Daemon aims his lance low.

=== Season 2 ===
Gwayne arrives at King's Landing upon invitation from his sister Queen Alicent Hightower, where she introduces him to Hand of the King Ser Criston Cole and recommends that Criston allow Gwayne to accompany him in his campaign to Harrenhal. Days later, Gwayne and a few other soldiers make towards an inn for their own amusement, but Criston criticizes him and notices they're on open ground. Sensing Princess Baela Targaryen and her dragon Moondancer in the sky, Cole leads Gwayne and the others into the forest to escape just before Baela withdraws her attack and departs. Gwayne thanks Criston for saving his life, who orders Gwayne not to stop at any other inns again.

Cole and Gwayne lead the sack of Duskendale, where Cole beheads Lord Gunthor Darklyn after the battle. Their army then marches to Rook's Rest, where Gwayne protests Criston's decision to attack their enemies in broad daylight, arguing they will be spotted and picked off by an enemy dragon. Princess Rhaenys Targaryen arrives to defend Rook's Rest from the greens on her dragon Meleys, while King Aegon II Targaryen arrives soon after on his dragon Sunfyre. Gwayne chides Cole while Rhaenys and Aegon fight in the sky, which is soon interrupted by the arrival of Prince Aemond Targaryen on Vhagar. After Aemond sends Rhaenys, Aegon, and their dragons down from the sky, Gwayne seizes the opportunity to rally the green soldiers and take the castle.

As their army later marches with Meleys' head through the streets of King's Landing, Gwayne questions Cole on whether they achieved a true victory. He converses with Alicent again, who asks him about her youngest son Prince Daeron Targaryen. Gwayne describes Daeron as "stalwart", "clever", and "kind", praising Alicent for allowing him to be raised away from King's Landing. He then sets off with Cole again toward Harrenhal with an army, where he confronts Criston in the woods for breaking his vows as Kingsguard by sleeping with Alicent. Cole does not excuse his past actions, but instead reflects extensively on the hypocrisy of upholding "honor" as knights, and declares that they are powerless in a war of devastating dragon warfare. As Cole proclaims to be "marching toward our annihilation", a shocked Gwayne does not respond and sits down alongside Criston.

=== Season 3 ===
Gwayne witnesses a village girl tearfully running away following sexual assault from soldiers in their army, after which he goes to Criston to recommend holding these soldiers accountable. Cole refuses to take direct action himself, cynically stating that war brings out the worst qualities in men. Their army reaches Harrenhal days later, finding the castle abandoned with the exception of Alys Rivers, who claims that Aemond and Vhagar have left the castle and that Queen Rhaenyra Targaryen has taken King's Landing. Upon hearing this, Gwayne suggests that their army make for Tumbleton to join forces with Lord Ormund Hightower's host, which Cole declines in favor of guerilla tactics against the nearby Winter Wolves and Riverlands armies.

Their army successfully executes multiple guerilla attacks, but are progressively slowed down by caltrops placed under the command of Lords Roderick Dustin and Oscar Tully. They are left stranded after a bridge across the river had been burned, and Gwayne once again suggests going to Tumbleton, offering Cole a life of service in Oldtown. Criston insists that they continue their progress, leading Gwayne to realize that Criston is intentionally leading their army into a suicide mission. He abandons Cole and departs with a few men towards Tumbleton, which he successfully reaches around the same time that Cole's army is routed by Roderick and Oscar's forces.

Gwayne and Ormund clash upon his arrival, as Ormund wishes to continue holding Tumbleton even with two dragonriders on the blacks watching over the town, insisting Rhaenyra wouldn't dare burn the town with civilians inside. He also utters homophobic insults towards Gwayne, before ordering Daeron to take Gwayne to his quarters. Daeron shares his own frustrations of Ormund forcing him to be a puppet king under his control, and Gwayne promises to protect Daeron and keep him safe from Ormund. Later, the three of them and Ormund's second-in-command Ser Jon Roxton are visited by a group of Baratheon soldiers who state that Lord Borros Baratheon has declared for Daeron, but Gwayne realizes they are assassins sent to kill Daeron and Ormund. Gwayne stabs their leader before can they make their move, and an intense duel takes place between the assassins and Hightower guards led by Gwayne and Jon. The guards defeat the assassins, keeping Daeron and Ormund safe. Ormund later apologizes to Gwayne for his treatment and allows him to go to Oldtown, which Gwayne accepts before he asks Ormund about his true intentions with Tumbleton.

Gwayne and his men depart for Oldtown but turn back after discovering Northern and Rivermen forces of 20,000 warriors in their vicinity. He warns Ormund that this massive force is two days away from launching an offensive on Tumbleton, but Ormund dismisses him and asserts that he has "another piece on the board". Upon learning of Lord Corlys Velaryon's capture, Gwayne and Daeron conclude that Ormund's plans will likely get them and their army killed. Gwayne and Daeron reject each other's plans to counter Ormund, forcing them to stay in the interim.

As the black forces accompanied by Daemon prepare to attack the city, Gwayne and Daeron release Corlys from captivity. Gwayne takes Corlys with him outside of the walls to parley with the blacks, where he suggests a peace deal in which Rhaenyra would rule over the Crownlands, North, Vale, and Riverlands from King's Landing, while Daeron would rule an indepdent kingdom of the Reach, Stormlands, and Westerlands from Oldtown. Daemon ridicules this proposal and strangles Gwayne to near death, sending him running back into the walls and taking Corlys as prisoner.

Gwayne scrambles to find Daeron as the blacks begin their attack, and eventually discovers him saddling his dragon Tessarion for battle. Gwayne pleads with him to use Tessarion to escape instead of fighting for Ormund, all while they find out about Ulf White's defection as he burns black forces outside the walls with his dragon Silverwing. The two of them run for their lives when Ulf begins scorching the whole town with dragonfire, but get caught in one of Silverwing's attacks as Gwayne is knocked unconscious. He reawakens following the battle, and frantically searches for Daeron in the rubble.

== Reception ==
Gwayne was considered to be a fan-favorite character in Season 3, as various audience members praised his character development, chemistry with Daeron, and cautious opposition to Ormund while hoping for his character to survive the season. His expanded role from the books was described by Fox as giving Gwayne "more dimensionality" and allowing him to explore the character more deeply in his performance. A scene from season three where Ormund directs homophobic remarks at Gwayne drew discussion on the queer-coding of Gwayne's character and of his dymanic with Ormund, with writer Ysmael “Eng” Delicana describing him as "someone shaped by scrutiny, restraint, and the expectations placed on him".
