= Ormund Hightower =

Fictional character

- A Song of Ice and Fire character House of the Dragon character
- James Norton as Ormund Hightower during the third season of House of the Dragon
- First appearance: Literature: The Princess and the Queen (2013); Television: "Salt and Sea, Fire and Blood" (2026)
- Last appearance: Television: "The Treasons at Tumbleton" (2026)
- Created by: George R. R. Martin
- Adapted by: Ryan Condal and George R. R. Martin (for House of the Dragon)
- Portrayed by: James Norton

In-universe information
- Gender: Male
- Titles: Lord of Oldtown; Beacon of the South; Defender of the Citadel
- Affiliation: The Greens
- Family: House Hightower
- Spouses: Unnamed wife (Note: Only within the canon of the A Song of Ice and Fire novels/novellas.); Samantha Tarly
- Children: with his first wife: Lyonel Hightower; Martyn Hightower; Garmund Hightower; Bethany Hightower
- Relatives: Hobert Hightower (father); Lynesse Hightower (mother)

Ormund Hightower is a fictional character from American author George R. R. Martin's the A Song of Ice and Fire series of epic fantasy novels, appearing in the 2013 novella The Princess and the Queen, the 2014 novella The Rogue Prince, the 2018 history book Fire & Blood, and the 2022 companion book The Rise of the Dragon. In the HBO television adaptation, House of the Dragon, he is portrayed by English actor James Norton.

== In the books ==
In Martin's novels, Ormund had three sons, Lyonel, Martyn, and Garmund, and a stillborn daughter, Bethany, with his unnamed first wife. Some time after Bethany's death, he married Samatha Tarly. During the civil war for the Iron Throne of Westeros known as the Dance of Dragons, Ormund fought for the Greens, the faction supporting his first cousin's Alicent Hightower's son Aegon II Targaryen as the rightful king, and led his forces from the Reach, though not all of the lords followed him, and Ormund's men suffered raids and losses as a result. In a skirmish known as the Battle of the Honeywine, Ormund and his men were trapped on the banks of the river Honeywine by opposing forces, but were rescued by Prince Daeron Targaryen, his squire and Aegon's brother, on his dragon Tessarion, who turned the tide of the battle in their favor. For his bravery, Ormund subsequently knighted Daeron, declaring him Daeron the Daring. When King's Landing fell to Aegon's opposition, led by Alicent's stepdaughter Rhaenyra Targaryen, who declared herself queen, Ormund and Daeron continued to seize territory for the Greens.

== Television adaptation ==
=== Casting and development ===
Norton's casting as Ormund was announced on January 21, 2025. The official casting description for the character stated that he was "Otto's (Rhys Ifans) nephew, Alicent (Olivia Cooke) and Gwayne's (Freddie Fox) cousin, and the Lord of Oldtown. He is presently leading the Hightower host in a march on King's Landing to support his house against Rhaenyra (Emma D'Arcy)." Prior to his first appearance in the season three premiere "Salt and Sea, Fire and Blood", Ormund was mentioned several times during season two.

Because of the relatively limited amount of information given about the character in Martin's novels, House of the Dragon showrunner Ryan Condal felt he had more agency in developing and altering Ormund's story for the series. Condal compared Ormund to Tywin Lannister, stating that, "he's the richest guy who's not sitting on a throne somewhere. Ormund has the largest standing army left in Westeros and a dragon, so he is going to introduce a big old wrinkle into this. Ormund is really a sketch in the book and we don't have a sense of who he is, so it was really fun diving in and creating a really deep, complex and three-dimensional character out of him that introduces a new kind of complication into the world."

Describing Ormund, Norton called him "delicious", "eccentric", and "really multifaceted and weird", explaining that, "there's always another facet to his trauma, his family, his sexuality, his appetite. Whatever it might be, he's an enigma, and it just keeps on getting weirder and weirder," and enjoyed the opportunity to explore a character who continuously reveals new layers throughout the season. Furthermore, Norton referred to Ormund as "a new engine in the series" and a "catalyst for chaos" and felt that his ambition and status as an antagonist to Rhaenyra was something that drew him to the role. While many publications cited Ormund as the third season's main villain, Norton expressed that he didn't think any of the show's characters were so easy to categorise but did acknowledge that, "Ormund has some very heinous ways he is enacting his North Star narrative, but really what he wants, he believes in. He believes that the Hightowers should be on the throne and that the Targaryens are a savage race, and he believes he's doing it for the good of the kingdom and his family." He further referred to Ormund as "so self-assured. He has conviction in his cause" who "he will fight, tooth and nail, for that, against all the odds" to achieve his aim of putting a Hightower on the throne, and explained the "fanaticism he has around the superiority of the Hightower lineage" significantly impacts his relationship with Daeron, who is half Hightower and half Targaryen.

Discussing Ormund's relationship with Daeron, which differs from the one depicted in the books, Norton stated, "there's deep, twisted, abusive, psychologically abusive relationships that are going on there. It's almost like Stockholm Syndrome where there are moments with real love between them, like the end of episode 4 where Ormund is so proud of him that he's able to murder that man in cold blood. And what I was able to see in Daeron is a young boy who's just desperate to be loved and held and that his eyes were welling up with tears. It was so moving...So that's why the relationship was so interesting to excavate." Benjamin Evan Ainsworth, who plays Daeron, called their relationship "twisted" and similarly explained, "he's been his father figure for most of his life. With that comes this, I guess, longing for acceptance and appreciation. With the chaos and the unpredictable elements, it's like seeing through that theatricality and trying to know what's at the heart of these decisions he makes in order for his own survival, but also to see the bigger picture." Norton added that he and Ainsworth worked on ensure the relationship was also believable to viewers and stated, "what was really important, I think, to both of us was—to offset the theatricality—make sure that this relationship was very real and authentic" and stated that he felt Daeron was "he most important person in his life. There is affection, there's love there, however warped that is." He further described Ormund's faith as something that has "tipped into a kind of fanaticism" and that "there's a level of superiority which he ascribes to the Hightowers, which is verging on—it's not just dubious, it's fascist" and stated, "there was a version of Ormund who would've been camp, ludicrous, really fun and delicious. Then it was these other parts of him, particularly the relationship with Daeron and also this other more sinister part of him, which is almost like the eugenics side of him where he fervently believes that his kin are entitled to the throne because they are just superior." Norton felt that Gwayne brings out Ormund's "true authentic self" and that he and Freddie Fox "nodded to sort of a very complicated history" during the season and that he, Fox, and Ainsworth spoke at length with Condal to ensure that the dynamics between the three men were clearly defined. Discussing the assassination attempt in "Faceless Men", Ainsworth explained that Daeron sees a new side to Ormund, whom he describes as "debilitated" and that this would start to shift the power dynamics between them moving forwards following the return of Gwayne.

Regarding his characterisation, Norton explained, "they wanted to take a big swing, be delicious, be villainous, imbue him with all the complexities that all the characters have. It was music to my ears because I was able to go dark with his relationship with Daeron, the fanaticism, the conviction he has around the Hightower claim to the throne, but also the playfulness and pomander and the smells and the big swings. It’s got everything, and it’s f---ing lovely for me as an actor to play all that."

Emma D'Arcy, who plays Rhaenyra, said of the character, "Ormund is a totally unknown quantity; he's this kind of erratic element. And I think increasingly, and we see this as we go forward, he sort of becomes the boogeyman for Rhaenyra, and fuels a broader distrust of her council, her allies, her court at large." Condal further noted, that Daemon and Rhaenyra "don't know how to wage combat" against Ormund, which is by his own design, while writer Philippa Goslett described him as "an incredibly dangerous man, and Ormund will do anything and everything to destabilize Rhaenyra's reign".

=== Season 3 ===
Having been summoned to reinforce the defence of King's Landing, Ormund leads the Hightower army of 15,000 men through the Reach, but Ormund receives a message from Alicent advising him to make camp and await the arrival of Aemond in three days time. Ormund obliges the order and sends the messenger to be bathed and fed, perturbed by his rancid smell after riding non-stop from the capital. When Rhaenrya and her forces take King's Landing, Ormund and the army are intercepted by Daemon, Hugh, Ulf, and their dragons and, aware that his men cannot outmatch them, Ormund begrudgingly bends the knee to Rhaenyra, surrenders his ward Daeron, and agrees to return to Oldtown. It is later revealed that Ormund's surrender was a ruse, and that he had sent an imposter in Daeron's place, while he and his army, with the real Daeron alongside them, seize the Black stronghold of Tumbleton, hoping to bait Rhaenyra into using her dragons against his position and killing hundreds of her own subjects in the process to sour Westeros's perception of her. Ormund takes Tumbleton's castle as his headquarters over the protests of Lord Glendon and Lady Sharis Footly, mocking them for their allegiance to Rhaenyra, though he vows to keep his men under control while they occupy the town. When his second-in-command, Jon Roxton expresses concern their defenses won't hold without Vhagar, Ormund assures him and Daeron that Aemond will soon join them.

Ormund is later summoned to arbitrate when one of his soldiers is accused of trying to rape Kat and breaking the arm of her brother when he intervened. Ormund agrees that the offending soldier violated guest right and orders he be gelded and have his own arm broken, adding in a threat to execute the soldier if he commits another crime. Later, Ormund receives word from Gwayne that Aemond and Vhagar have disappeared. Seeing Ormund's building anger at the news, Daeron ushers the servants out of the room for their safety before Ormund explodes with rage, smashing the table with his sword and denouncing Aemond as a coward. After a moment, Ormund recomposes himself, informs Daeron Aemond will not be joining them, and thus their plans must change. That evening, Ormund finds Daeron spending time with his dragon Tessarion, who is confined in Tumbleton's sept: he chastises Daeron for showing Tessarion too much affection, dismissively calling her a "beast". Ormund declares his intention to seat Daeron as king on the Iron Throne to restore Andal rule to Westeros, deposing both Rhaenyra (who as a woman Ormund considers unfit to rule) and his older brothers, who Ormund considers tainted from their Targaryen blood, in contrast to Daeron, who has been "raised in the light of the Seven". Ormund then emotionally blackmails Daeron into killing a man of Tumbleton who struck a Hightower soldier, ignoring Daeron's protests that the man only did so to defend his wife and sister on the grounds that as King, an attack on a Hightower soldier is an attack on Daeron. He later tells Daeron the story of Meria Martell one of the few women he respects, for having successfully resisted Aegon the Conqueror's efforts to subjugate Dorne through guerilla warfare.

Ormund secretly finances a resistance movement in King's Landing, commanding Hightower loyalists within the city to murder members of the gold cloaks loyal to Daemon, hoping to portray Rhaenyra as too weak to keep law and order in her own city, and has them distribue coins minted with Daeron's likeness to spread awareness of Daeron's claim as the rightful king. Gwayne arrives in Tumbleton where Ormund mocks him for abandoning Criston Cole's army and makes disparaging remarks about Gwayne's sexuality. Privately, Daeron begs Gwayne not to leave him again as he does not want to be Ormund's puppet king. Ormund is pleased when a House Baratheon envoy arrives to swear allegiance to Daeron, but Gwayne realizes that they are assassins sent by Rhaenyra, and kills them, saving Ormund and Daeron's lives. A furious Ormund vows to kill Rhaenyra for the attempt on his life, before the stench of the carnage overwhelms him and he vomits copiously over the table. Ormund later has the bloodied surcoat of one of the assassins sent to Rhaenyra at King's Landing as proof of the attempt's failure. He and Gwayne then reconcile somewhat, and Ormund gives him leave to return to Oldtown, though Gwayne subsequently returns to Tumbelton, bringing word that Rhaenyra's Riverlands army is imminent and will attempt to take back the city. Ormund appears unconcerned, having captured Corlys Velaryon and sent his severed finger to his son Alyn to demoralize the Velaryon forces and prevent them helping Rhaenyra maintain order in King's Landing. He unsuccessfully attempts to convert Corlys to his side when he insults Corlys' late wife Rhaenys on account of her Targaryen blood. That evening, Ormund secretly meets with Ulf who, having grown disillusioned with the Blacks due to Rhaenyra and Daemon's mistreatment of him, agrees to turn his cloak to the Greens for the castle and lordship Ormund promised him in return.

When the Black army approaches Tumbleton, the Hightower forces are unable to find Ulf, who has been drinking. Ormund finally finds him asleep in a privy, and strikes him, demanding that he begin his attacks on the Blacks on Silverwing. During the Battle of Tumbleton, Lord Roderick Dustin is able to enter Tumbleton and fights Ormund. Despite Ormund chopping off Roderick's arm, Roderick manages to stab him in the anus. Ulf has meanwhile begun burning the Black forces, but takes his revenge on Ormund by burning him to death as well, alongside Roderick.

== Reception ==
The character and Norton's performance earned critical acclaim. Helen O'Hara of IGN praised Ormund's characterisation throughout the third season, but particularly in "Tumbleton" and wrote, "the combination of such unpredictable violence with his prissy aversion to dirt and fastidious dress sense suggests two things to the seasoned Westeros watcher. One, this guy is going to be fun. Two, he's probably going to endure the smelliest smells that ever stank during his campaign." Similarly, Alec Bojaland of Den of Geek called Ormund "one of the show's most dynamic figures yet" and wrote, "it's another example of House of the Dragon showrunner Ryan Condal and his team uncovering some captivating character traits in the margins of (fake) history. Why wouldn't Lord Ormund want his pseudo-son to sit the Iron Throne? Why wouldn't he see himself as a scholarly raconteur despite frequently demonstrating blinding rage? And why wouldn't he have an inexplicably sensitive nose? Those are all human traits and Lord Ormund, as brought to life by James Norton, is human".
