= Corlys Velaryon =

Biography of a ficitional character

- A Song of Ice and Fire character House of the Dragon character
- Steve Toussaint as Corlys Velaryon in the first season of House of the Dragon
- First appearance: Literature: The Princess and the Queen (2013); Television: "The Heirs of the Dragon" (2022)
- Created by: George R. R. Martin
- Adapted by: Ryan Condal and George R. R. Martin (for House of the Dragon)
- Portrayed by: Steve Toussaint

In-universe information
- Alias: The Sea Snake
- Gender: Male
- Titles: Ser; Master of Driftmark; Lord of the Tides; Hand of the Queen
- Affiliation: The Blacks
- Spouse: Rhaenys Targaryen
- Children: Laena Velaryon; Laenor Velaryon; Alyn of Hull (illegitimate); Addam of Hull (illegitimate)
- Relatives: Vaemond Velaryon (brother); Jacaerys Velaryon (grandson); Lucerys Velaryon (grandson); Joffrey Velaryon (grandson); Baela Targaryen (granddaughter); Rhaena Targaryen (granddaughter); Daemon Targaryen (son-in-law); Rhaenyra Targaryen (daughter-in-law)

Corlys Velaryon, nicknamed "The Sea Snake", is a fictional character from George R.R. Martin's A Song of Ice and Fire series of epic fantasy novels, appearing in the 2013 novella The Princess and the Queen, the 2014 novella The Rogue Prince and the 2018 novel Fire & Blood. In the HBO television adaptation House of the Dragon, he is portrayed by English actor Steve Toussaint.

In both the books and the show, Corlys is the Lord of the Tides, Master of the island of Driftmark and the head of House Velaryon. He is married to Princess Rhaenys Targaryen, the cousin of King Viserys I Targaryen, with whom he has two children, Laena and Laenor. Through his children's marriages to Rhaenyra and Daemon Targaryen, he is also the grandfather of Jacaerys, Lucerys and Joffrey Velaryon, and Baela and Rhaena Targaryen. Prior to the events of the series, he embarked on nine great voyages across the known world, accumulating enough wealth to make the Velaryons the richest house in Westeros.

Corlys begins the series as the Master of Ships on Viserys' small council, though his relationship with the crown is strained due to various perceived slights against his house. However, following Viserys' death and the usurpation of the throne by Aegon II Targaryen and the Greens, Corlys throws his support behind Queen Rhaenyra Targaryen, fighting for the Black faction during the Targaryen civil war known as the Dance of the Dragons. Corlys acts as Rhaenyra's Hand of the Queen for much of the war and as the Blacks' primary naval commander, leading the Velaryon fleet during the climactic Battle of the Gullet, though he loses much of his wealth over the course of the war.

Despite some initial fan backlash over the decision to recast the Velaryons as black, the character of Corlys and Toussaint's performance have received acclaim from both fans and critics, and he remains one of the show's most popular and well-liked characters.

== In the books ==
=== Fire and Blood ===
==== Early life ====
Corlys was born in 53 AC to Corwyn Velaryon, the eldest son and heir of Lord Daemon Velaryon, the Lord of Driftmark and head of House Velaryon. By the time he was twenty-three, Corlys established himself as one of Westeros' most celebrated sailors, later embarking on nine great voyages across the known world aboard his ship The Sea Snake. Corlys returned from his voyages with various treasures and artifacts, making House Velaryon became the richest house in Westeros, and used his newly accumulated wealth to construct a castle on Driftmark called High Tide. Corlys later took the nickname 'The Sea Snake' after his eponymous ship.

==== Lord of the Tides ====
In 90 AC, Corlys married Princess Rhaenys Targaryen, the only child of Prince Aemon Targaryen, the eldest son of King Jaehaerys I Targaryen; they had two children, a daughter, Laena, and a son, Laenor.. When Aemon was killed fighting Myrish pirates on the island of Tarth, King Jaehaerys passed over Rhaenys as heir to the throne in favour of his second son, Baelon, causing a furious Corlys to resign from the Small Council in response.

When Prince Baelon died in 101 AC, King Jaehaerys announced that a Great Council would be held at Harrenhal to decide the future monarch. Corlys and Rhaenys advocated for Laenor to take the throne, but in the end, Baelon's eldest son, Viserys, was crowned King Viserys I Targaryen upon the old king's death.

When Viserys' wife, Queen Aemma Arryn, died in 105 AC, the Small Council proposed that he marry Corlys' daughter Laena to seal the rift between their houses. Viserys instead married Alicent Hightower, daughter of the Hand of the King, Otto Hightower, angering Corlys further. Corlys later allied himself with Viserys' brother, Daemon Targaryen, to conquer the Stepstones, a cluster of islands occupied by an alliance of the Free Cities known as the Triarchy. The fighting began in 106 AC and lasted three years, after which Corlys crowned Daemon King of the Stepstones and the Narrow Sea.

In 113 AC, King Viserys proposed a betrothal between his daughter and heir, Princess Rhaenyra Targaryen, and Corlys' son, Laenor. The two were married a year later, and had three children; Jacaerys, Lucerys and Joffrey. His daughter, Laena, was originally betrothed to the son of a former Sealord of Braavos, but their betrothal ended when he was killed by Daemon in a duel, who subsequently wed Laena and gave Corlys twin granddaughters, Baela and Rhaena. However, both of Corlys' children predeceased their father; in 120 AC, Laena died giving birth to her third child, while Laenor was stabbed to death by his rumoured lover, Ser Qarl Correy.

In 126 AC, Corlys fell ill with a fever that many feared he would die from, putting the succession of Driftmark into question. As both his children were dead, Rhaenyra insisted that her second son, Lucerys, should inherit Driftmark, a decision that was protested by Corlys' eldest nephew, Ser Vaemond Velaryon. Vaemond declared that Rhaenyra's children were bastards and insisted he should be named heir instead; he was later captured and executed by Daemon on Rhaenyra's orders. When Vaemond's wife, children and siblings fled to King's Landing to protest to Viserys, the king had their tongues cut out for repeating the rumour regarding the paternity of Rhaenyra's children.

==== The Dance of the Dragons ====
In 129 AC, Viserys died and the throne was ascended by his eldest son Aegon II Targaryen instead of Rhaenyra. Corlys threw the support of his house behind his former daughter-in-law's claim. He sat on Rhaenyra's black council and used his fleet to block off the Gullet - the stretch of water between Dragonstone and Driftmark - to block any ships from entering or leaving the city, thereby crippling the Greens' trade.

When Prince Lucerys Velaryon was killed by Rhaenyra's half-brother, Prince Aemond Targaryen, the griefstricken queen handed over command of the war council to Corlys and Rhaenys. When Rhaenys was killed by King Aegon and Prince Aemond during the Battle of Rook's Rest, Corlys angrily blamed Rhaenyra, who had forbidden her sons from accompanying his wife into battle. This rift was later mended when Prince Jacaerys named him Hand of the Queen.

Corlys and Jacaerys planned an assault on King's Landing, during which the prince offered lands and titles to anyone who would mount one of the riderless dragons on Dragonstone. One such successful rider was Addam of Hull, who claimed Seasmoke, the dragon of Corlys' late son, Laenor. Addam and his brother Alyn were purported to be Laenor's bastard sons, though Mushroom suggests that they were actually the sons of Corlys himself. Nevertheless, Corlys successfully petitioned for the boys to be legitimised as Velaryons.

In late 129 AC, the Velaryon blockade in the Gullet was ambushed by the Triarchy fleet, who had allied themselves with the Greens, leading to the Battle of the Gullet. The battle was a pyrrhic victory; while the Triarchy fleet was annihilated and played no further part in the Dance, one third of the Velaryon fleet was destroyed, High Tide was sacked and burned, and Prince Jacaerys and his dragon, Vermax, were killed. When congratulated upon his victory, Corlys replied, "If this be victory, I pray I never win another".

In 130 AC, the Blacks seized King's Landing, but problems still remained; Aegon and his remaining children were missing, Aemond was terrorising the riverlands on Vhagar, and Lord Ormund Hightower and Prince Daeron Targaryen's army was marching on the city. When Hugh Hammer and Ulf White, two of the four dragonseeds, betrayed the Blacks at the First Battle of Tumbleton, an enraged Rhaenyra ordered the remaining dragonseeds arrested, including Addam Velaryon. Corlys helped Addam escape on Seasmoke and was arrested by the Goldcloaks and condemned to death, causing House Velaryon to abandon Rhaenyra's cause.

When Rhaenyra fled King's Landing after the Storming of the Dragonpit, Corlys was offered a full pardon by the Greens in exchange for his support. Corlys agreed provided all who fought for Rhaenyra were pardoned and that Rhaenyra's fourth son, Prince Aegon the Younger, was married to Aegon's daughter Jaehaera and named his heir. Aegon died by poisoning soon after, ending the Dance.

==== Aftermath ====
When Cregan Stark retook King's Landing following Aegon's death, he arrested twenty-two men for poisoning Aegon II, including Corlys, though he was later freed and his titles restored by King Aegon III Targaryen. In 131 AC, Corlys served as one of Aegon III's regents, but died one year later at the age of seventy-nine.

=== A Song of Ice and Fire ===
Corlys is not directly mentioned in the main A Song of Ice and Fire novels.

== Television adaptation ==
=== Conception ===
In February 2021, English actor Steve Toussaint was announced to have been cast as Corlys Velaryon. Toussaint received racist abuse online following the announcement of his casting, as the Velaryons in the novels are described as having pale skin and silver hair, much like the Targaryens. Showrunner Ryan Condal clarified that this decision was not to "tick a box" but to introduce a level of racial diversity within the show's casting, as well to make the Velaryons visually distinct from the Targaryens.

=== Season 1 ===
Corlys is introduced during the Great Council at Harrenhal, where his wife, Princess Rhaenys Targaryen, is passed over as the future monarch in favour of her male cousin, who ascends the throne as King Viserys I Targaryen; Corlys remains bitter about this for many years. Nine years later, Corlys urges Viserys to deal with an emerging alliance of the Free Cities known as the Triarchy, but is dismissed by the king and his Hand, Otto Hightower. He and Rhaenys later attend the Heir's Tournament and the funeral of Queen Aemma and Prince Baelon. Corlys later attends a Small Council meeting discussing the succession crisis caused by Baelon's death, where he initially supports Prince Daemon Targaryen's claim before unsuccessfully pushing for Rhaenys' claim. He later reaffirms his loyalty to Viserys as king and Rhaenyra as his heir.

Six months later, Corlys continues to demand action be taken against the Triarchy but is again ignored. Corlys later proposes a marriage pact between Viserys and his daughter Laena, which the small council supports, but Viserys instead chooses to marry Otto's daughter, Lady Alicent Hightower. Enraged by this slight, Corlys resigns from the small council and allies himself with Daemon, proposing that they wipe out the Triarchy themselves without aid from the crown.

Three years later, Corlys and Daemon are losing their war against the Triarchy. Corlys' brother Vaemond suggests rebelling against Daemon but is shot down by Corlys and his son, Laenor. When Viserys offers aid to Daemon and Corlys, the two devise a counterattack during which Corlys and his men ambush the Triarchy soldiers and Daemon slays the Triarchy admiral, Craghas Drahar. Corlys later crowns Daemon King of the Narrow Sea following their victory.

Some time later, Viserys and Rhaenyra visit Driftmark to discuss a potential marriage between the princess and Laenor. Corlys accepts when Viserys confirms that any children sired by Rhaenyra and Laenor will inherit the throne, regardless of gender. The wedding festivities begin well until Ser Criston Cole beats Ser Joffrey Lonmouth, a Velaryon knight and Laenor's secret lover, to death in front of the wedding guests. Rhaenyra and Laenor are then hastily married in a private ceremony.

Ten years later, Corlys now has five granddchildren; grandsons Jacaerys, Lucerys and Joffrey via Rhaenyra and Laenor (though they are really the sons of Rhaenyra's sworn sword, Harwin Strong), and granddaughters Baela and Rhaena via Daemon and Laena. When Laena dies in childbirth, the Velaryons and Targaryens return to High Tide for her funeral. After the burial, Rhaenys asks Corlys to name Baela as heir to Driftmark over Lucerys, but Corlys refuses, believing that doing so would cast further doubt on the boy's legitimacy. Both are later present when Alicent attacks Lucerys after he has slashed out the eye of her son, Aemond Targaryen. The next night, Laenor is seemingly murdered in a duel with Ser Qarl Correy, and an angry Corlys resumes fighting in the Stepstones.

Six years later, Corlys is left severely injured in a Triarchy ambush, leading to a dispute over his succession between his named heir, Lucerys, and Vaemond, who insists the boy is a bastard and that Driftmark should thus be his. Determined to fight for her children's birthright, Rhaenyra convinces Rhaenys to back Lucerys' claim in exchange for betrothing her two eldest sons to Baela and Rhaena. Viserys confirms Lucerys as Corlys' heir and accepts the betrothal, causing an enraged Vaemond loudly declares that Rhaenyra's children are bastards and is subsequently beheaded by Daemon.

Following Viserys' death and Aegon II Targaryen's ascension to the throne over Rhaenyra, Corlys' fever breaks and he is sailed to Dragonstone. Once there, Rhaenys admonishes Corlys for abandoning her and their grandchildren to continue his crusade in the Stepstones. Corlys admits his error, stating that he will abandon his pursuit for power and resists supporting Rhaenyra's side, but Rhaenys points out that his grandsons are all claimants to the Iron Throne and will not be safe so long as Aegon is king. Corlys later joins the Black Council and reaffirms his loyalty to Rhaenyra, pledging the Velaryon fleet and soldiers to her cause.

=== Season 2 ===
Following Lucerys' death at the hands of Aemond, a still-injured Corlys visits one of his sailors, Alyn of Hull, who saved him from death in the Stepstones and is helping to rebuild the damaged Sea Snake. Alyn offers his condolences for Lucerys' death, but awkwardly rebuffs Corlys when he thanks him for saving his life. Corlys is later visited by Rhaenys, who points out that he will need to find a new heir, as he may die during the war without a named successor. Rhaenys later confirms to Corlys that she knows Alyn is his bastard son, insisting that he be raised up to a position of honour.

Corlys and Rhaenys are later summoned back to Dragonstone by Baela to help her and Jacaerys keep the Black Council under control in Rhaenyra's absence. When Ser Criston Cole attacks Rook's Rest, Rhaenys offers to meet Cole at Rook's Rest but is killed when she and her dragon Meleys are ambushed by Aemond on Vhagar and Aegon on Sunfyre.

Following his wife's death, Corlys retreats back to High Tide in grief. He is later comforted by Baela, who also informs him that Rhaenyra has named him Hand of the Queen. Corlys rebuffs this at first, but eventually decides to accept the position after Baela tells him that she will continue to fight for Rhaenyra. Corlys later returns to the shipyard to name Alyn his second in command.

Upon learning that Seasmoke has a new rider, Corlys discovers that he is Addam of Hull, Alyn's brother. He congratulates his son for rising up in the world and releases him from his service as a shipwright. When Rhaenyra announces her intention to find new riders for the dragons Vermithor and Silverwing, Corlys asks Alyn if he wants to claim a dragon as well, but Alyn refuses in favour of remaining in Corlys' navy. Corlys and Rhaenyra later discuss battle tactics.

Upon the completion of the Sea Snake's repairs, Corlys renames the ship to the Queen Who Never Was, after the moniker of his late wife. He again attempts to connect with Alyn, who angrily lashes out at Corlys for abandoning him and Addam, accusing his father of only acknowledging them now because all of his legitimate children and heirs are dead. Alyn reiterates his intention to do his duty, but refuses any help from Corlys going forward. The two then depart for the Queen Who Never Was via rowboat.

=== Season 3 ===
Whilst sailing through the Gullet, Corlys speaks with Alyn and acknowledges his failure as a father, but is interrupted when the Triarchy fleet, led by Sharako Lohar and Ser Tyland Lannister, attack the Velaryon ships. During the battle, Corlys sails the Queen Who Never Was through a rocky pass, hoping that Lohar will chase after them and destroy her ship, the Bitchfist, in the process. When Lohar survives the chase, she rams her ship into Corlys' and the two engage in combat, during which Corlys sees that High Tide has been sacked and burned. During the fight, Corlys loses his footing and falls into the sea, and Lohar is killed by Alyn.

After the battle is over, Alyn, Addam and Baela search for Corlys while Hugh Hammer and Ulf White eliminate the remaining Triarchy ships. Addam eventually finds Corlys washed up by some rocks, and bring him to shore. Having lost his home, his wealth and much of his fleet, Corlys names Alyn as his heir, and promises to have he and Addam legitimised by Rhaenyra.

Following the fall of King's Landing to the Blacks, Corlys meets with Rhaenyra, where he reveals that Alyn and Addam are his sons and requests that they be legitimised as Velaryons. Rhaenyra later knights both of them but does not grant them the name Velaryon. When he confronts her about this, Rhaenyra claims that legitimising Corlys' sons would cast doubt over Joffrey's legitimacy, given the rumours surrounding the true parentage of her children. Corlys angrily berates Rhaenyra, pointing out that he has given everything to her cause, including accepting her children as Velaryons despite knowing they were bastards.

Angered by Rhaenyra's slight, Corlys leaves King's Landing to deal with the surviving Trirachy pirates, but leaves Alyn to attend the Small Council in his stead. When a number of the Goldcloaks are mysteriously murdered on the orders of Ormund Hightower, Alyn visits Corlys to request that he send Velaryon men to strengthen the city's defences. A still irate Corlys questions why Alyn is taking Rhaenyra's side when she refused him legitimacy, but relents when Alyn points out that Corlys similarly refused to acknowledge his sons for years.

Later that evening, Corlys prepares to return to King's Landing, but is ambushed and captured by Ormund's men and taken to the recently captured city of Tumbleton. Corlys refuses to comply with Ormund, who subsequently cuts off his finger and sends it to Rhaenyra as a warning. As Daemon and the Black army gather outside Tumbleton's walls, Corlys is freed by Ser Gwayne Hightower and Prince Daeron Targaryen, who believe Ormund has gone mad and hope to use Corlys as a bargaining chip to prevent an assault on the city walls. When Daemon ignores Gwayne's peace proposal that Daeron be allowed to rule the Reach as an independent kingdom, Corlys suggests an alternative deal, where Daeron will be married to Rhaena and named Warden of the South. Daemon refuses Corlys' proposal and accuses him of betraying Rhaenyra, claiming him as his prisoner. As the Battle of Tumbelton begins, Corlys remains outside the town walls and dives for cover when Ulf betrays the Blacks and begins incinerating the Riverland army on Silverwing. When Ulf turns on the Greens as well and begins burning down the city, Corlys finds a shell-shocked Daemon and urges him to retreat.

== Reception ==
Since his introduction in the series, both the character of Corlys and Toussaint's performance have received critical praise, and he is widely considered one of the show's best characters. Zach Moser from Screen Rant ranked Toussaint's performance as Corlys as the 10th best in the show, praising him for balancing the "gravitas and strength needed" for the character, whilst also commending his ability to portray a man whose "best years are now just behind him". Colin McCormick of Winter Is Coming similarly ranked Toussaint's performance as the 8th best of the show's third season, saying "Steve Toussaint has quietly been one of House of the Dragon's most consistently excellent performers since the beginning, and season 3 gives Corlys some of his best moments yet". McCormick also noted that Corlys is "one of the closest things the show has to a hero", in contrast to the morally grey or outright villainous characters who make up the rest of the cast.

In his review of the episode 'Regent', Alec Bojalad from Den of Geek praised Toussaint's performance in the scenes focusing on Corlys' grief over Rhaenys' death, stating that these were "some of the hour’s best moments". However, James Hunt from Screen Rant felt that Corlys' grieving scenes in the episode were somewhat rushed, but nonetheless praised Toussaint for doing "an excellent job with the character".

Toussaint received particular praise for his performance in the third season premiere, 'Salt and Sea, Fire and Blood'. Julio Bardini from Collider praised Corlys' role in the episode, claiming that the character "steals the show", whilst Jarrod Jones from A.V. Club stated that the premiere "belongs to the Sea Snake", praising the episode for its focus on Corlys as a naval commander. The naval chase sequence between Corlys and Lohar was regularly highlighted by reviewers; Josh Rosenberg from Esquire praised the sequence as the "best scene of the episode", while Jones called it "the most chaotic and thrilling [sequence] in Thrones TV history". Daniel Roman of Winter Is Coming also praised the sequence for its tension and for giving Corlys "a chance to shine."

=== Casting backlash ===
The creative decision to recast the Velaryons as black, including Corlys, was met with fan backlash prior to the series' release. According to showrunner Ryan Condal, this decision was done in an effort to broaden the racial diversity of the cast, acknowledge the criticism Game of Thrones received for its lack of diverse casting, and reflect the changing attitudes towards casting in fantasy fiction, saying, "The world is very different now than it was 10 years ago when [Game of Thrones] all started. It's different than 20 years ago when Peter Jackson made The Lord of the Rings. These types of stories need to be more inclusive than they traditionally have been [...] It was very important for Miguel and I to create a show that was not another bunch of white people on the screen, just to put it very bluntly." Toussaint similarly defended the casting, saying, "For some reason, it seems to be very hard for people to swallow [...] they are happy with a dragon flying. They're happy with white hair and violet-colored eyes, but a rich Black guy? That's beyond the pale."
