= Phia Saban =

English actress (born 1998)

- Born: Sophia Alison M. Boreham Saban; 19 September 1998 (age 28); Hackney, England
- Education: Guildhall School of Music and Drama (BA)
- Occupation: Actress
- Years active: 2020–present

Sophia Alison M. "Phia" Boreham Saban (born 19 September 1998) is an English actress. She is known for her roles in the fifth series of the Netflix medieval drama The Last Kingdom (2022) and the HBO fantasy series House of the Dragon (2022–2026).

== Early life ==
Saban was born in Hackney, East London to parents Mark Saban and Penelope "Penny" Boreham. The family moved to Oxford when she was five or six, where she and her younger brother Gabriel attended d'Overbroeck's College. Saban went on to train at the Guildhall School of Music and Drama, graduating in 2020.

== Career ==
Saban made her television début when she joined the main cast of the Netflix medieval drama series The Last Kingdom (based on the novel of the same name) as Aelfwynn for its fifth and final series, which premiered in 2022. Saban's character was not included in the 2023 film The Last Kingdom: Seven Kings Must Die, which finalised the Netflix programme, due to the condensed running time from the change in format. Screenwriter Martha Hillier stated that "It was heartbreaking... But we only really had a certain amount of real estate and we couldn't service all the characters. It's a much more single protagonist story".

Later that year, Saban began playing Princess (later Queen) Helaena Targaryen in season one of the HBO fantasy series House of the Dragon, a Game of Thrones prequel and adaptation of George R. R. Martin's fictional history book Fire and Blood. Her performance received praise from fellow cast member Olivia Cooke. Saban was then confirmed to be in the cast for season two of House of the Dragon.

== Works ==
=== Film and television ===
Year	Title	Role	Network	Notes
2020	Christabel	Bella	BBC	BBC Radio 3 Drama
2022	The Last Kingdom	Ælfwynn	BBC Two/Netflix	Main role (season 5); 10 episodes
2022–2026	House of the Dragon	Helaena Targaryen	HBO	Main role; 16 episodes
2025	Sparks	Ruth		Short Film
2025	Resort	Clara	Amazon	Main role; Audible Original
2027	Laird		Paramount+	Main role

=== Stage ===
Year	Title	Role	Location
2024–2025	Oedipus	Antigone	Wyndham's Theatre
2025	The Maids	Solange	Donmar Warehouse
2026	The Maids	Solange	St. Ann's Warehouse
