= The Queen Who Ever Was =

- House of the Dragon episode
- Episode no.: Season 2 Episode 8
- Directed by: Geeta Vasant Patel
- Written by: Sara Hess
- Cinematography by: Catherine Goldschmidt
- Editing by: Crispin Green
- Original air date: August 4, 2024
- Running time: 70 minutes

Episode chronology
← Previous "The Red Sowing"	Next → "Salt and Sea, Fire and Blood"
- House of the Dragon season 2

"The Queen Who Ever Was" is the eighth and final episode of the second season of the fantasy drama television series House of the Dragon, a prequel to Game of Thrones. The episode was written by Sara Hess and directed by Geeta Vasant Patel. It first aired on HBO and Max on August 4, 2024. Several days before its release, scenes from the episode were leaked online and quickly shared among fans on TikTok, X, and Reddit.

In the United States, "The Queen Who Ever Was" garnered a viewership of 8.9 million during its premiere night, with nearly 1.5 million viewers on linear television alone. The episode was met with mixed reviews from critics, receiving a rating of 46% on Rotten Tomatoes, making it the lowest-rated episode of the series to date. The musical score, cinematography, and cast performances (particularly of Emma D'Arcy, Olivia Cooke, Abubakar Salim, Harry Collett, and Fabien Frankel) were highly praised. However, the episode was criticized as a weak season finale, with its cliffhanger failing to provide a satisfying conclusion to the season, though the set-up for the next season was appreciated.

== Plot ==
In Tyrosh, Tyland Lannister negotiates with the Triarchy for their fleet to help break the Velaryon shipping blockade. They agree but demand control over the Stepstones. Additionally, Admiral Sharako Lohar, a warrior woman referred to as a man by the Triarchy, challenges Tyland to a mud-wrestling match before agreeing to sail with him. He managed to beat Lohar, earning her respect, and they set sail for Westeros with the Triarchy's fleet.

Enraged over Rhaenyra's new dragonriders, Aemond flies Vhagar to the Black-allied port town of Sharp Point in the Crownlands, and incinerates the town with dragon fire. During the march on Harrenhal, Gwayne Hightower sees Criston Cole with Alicent's handkerchief and angrily accuses him of breaking his Kingsguard vows. Despondent, Criston expresses regret over past choices, telling Gwayne he believes they are headed towards annihilation by Rhaenyra's dragons.

In King's Landing, Larys Strong tells Aegon of Rhaenyra's new dragonriders and Aemond's decimating of Sharp Point. He also warns that Aemond's rage is an even greater threat to Aegon's life. Aegon wants to imprison his brother, but Larys argues that Aemond and Vhagar are essential assets to fighting the war. He proposes that they hide in Essos and reclaim the throne after Aemond and Rhaenyra have destroyed each other. Aemond demands that Helaena ride her dragon, Dreamfyre, into battle. He physically lashes out at her when she refuses, but Alicent intervenes, berating Aemond for being reckless and destructive. Later, Aemond tries to gently persuade Helaena, but she again declines, telling him that she knows he had burnt Aegon and Sunfyre at Rook's Rest and reveals she had foreseen his death while Aegon reclaims the throne. Later, Aegon and Larys secretly depart from the city in a covered wagon.

At Driftmark, Corlys Velaryon advises Rhaenyra to quickly utilize her new-found military advantage of more dragonriders. Corlys tries to bond with Alyn, who rebuffs his paternal attempts. Alyn rebukes Corlys for never showing interest in him and Addam when his legitimate children were alive, leaving the brothers to suffer as bastards. Corlys and Alyn set sail aboard Corlys' flagship, the "Queen Who Never Was", to join the Velaryon blockade.

Ser Alfred Broome arrives at Harrenhal as Rhaenyra's emissary and, surveying Daemon's army of Rivermen, pledges to follow him if he proclaims himself king. Alarmed after overhearing their conversation, Ser Simon Strong sends Rhaenyra a raven, warning that Daemon may be traitorous. At night, Alys Rivers leads Daemon to a weirwood tree, saying he is ready to see his fate, if he wishes. Daemon touches the tree and sees visions of the future, with one depicting a White Walker leading an army of wights and another featuring Daenerys Targaryen with her three dragon hatchlings. Helaena appears to Daemon, stating that he now knows the full story and his role in it. When Rhaenyra and Addam arrive at Harrenhal on dragonback the next day, Daemon reveals to Rhaenyra that he knows of the Song of Ice and Fire, and reaffirms his loyalty to her, bending the knee alongside the Rivermen; Broome retreats into the crowd.

Meanwhile in the Vale, exhausted from scouting the Vale's harsh countryside without sustenance or shelter, Rhaena finally encounters the wild dragon as it devours sheep. On Dragonstone, Baela empathizes with Jace, expressing her concerns over civilian casualties, as does Rhaenyra. Mysaria counsels her to remain strong as she has a major tactical advantage. During supper, Rhaenyra promises knighthood to Addam, Hugh, and Ulf if they serve her well, and announces they leave in two days to attack Lannisport and Oldtown.

Late at night, Alicent secretly arrives on Dragonstone and admits to Rhaenyra of her faults that helped cause the conflict and offers to let her peacefully take King's Landing after Aemond leaves for the Riverlands. In exchange, she pleads for her and her children's lives, but Rhaenyra insists she must take Aegon's life to end the war and secure the throne. Alicent seemingly acknowledges that and departs the castle, promising that the gates of King's Landing will be opened in three days time.

In the Reach, the Hightower host marches north accompanied by Prince Daeron Targaryen on his dragon, Tessarion. At the Twins, House Stark's army crosses south. In the Westerlands, Jason Lannister and Humfrey Lefford lead their host east. At Harrenhal, Daemon readies the armies of the Riverlands to march south. At sea, Tyland Lannister and Sharako Lohar sail with the Triarchy armada west across the Narrow Sea. Lord Corlys and Alyn join up with the Velaryon fleet in the Gullet. Somewhere unknown, Otto Hightower is held captive.

== Production ==
=== Writing and filming ===
"The Queen Who Ever Was" was written by executive producer Sara Hess and directed by co-executive producer Geeta Vasant Patel. It marks Hess' fourth time as writer for the series, following "The Princess and the Queen", "The Green Council" and "Rhaenyra the Cruel", and Patel's third directorial credit after "The Lord of the Tides" and "The Burning Mill".

=== Casting ===
The episode stars Matt Smith as Prince Daemon Targaryen, Emma D'Arcy as Queen Rhaenyra Targaryen, Olivia Cooke as Queen Dowager Alicent Hightower, Rhys Ifans as Ser Otto Hightower, Steve Toussaint as Lord Corlys Velaryon, Fabien Frankel as Ser Criston Cole, Matthew Needham as Lord Larys "Clubfoot" Strong, Sonoya Mizuno as Mysaria, Tom Glynn-Carney as King Aegon II Targaryen, Ewan Mitchell as Prince Aemond Targaryen, Phia Saban as Queen Helaena Targaryen, Harry Collett as Prince Jacaerys Velaryon, Bethany Antonia as Lady Baela Targaryen, Phoebe Campbell as Lady Rhaena Targaryen, Jefferson Hall as Ser Tyland Lannister and Lord Jason Lannister, Freddie Fox as Ser Gwayne Hightower, Gayle Rankin as Alys Rivers, Kurt Egyiawan as Grand Maester Orwyle, Abubakar Salim as Alyn of Hull, Clinton Liberty as Addam of Hull, Kieran Bew as Hugh Hammer, Tom Bennett as Ulf White, and Simon Russell Beale as Ser Simon Strong.

It marks the first appearance of Abigail Thorn as Admiral Sharako Lohar.

== Release ==
"The Queen Who Ever Was" premiered on August 4, 2024, on HBO and Max.

=== Internet leak ===
On July 30, 2024, several scenes from the episode were leaked and uploaded to a TikTok account, attracting between 50,000 to 100,000 viewers before the account was banned about three hours later. The leaked scenes quickly spread to other platforms like X and Reddit. In response, HBO issued a statement the following day, acknowledging the leak: "We are aware that clips from the House of the Dragon season finale have surfaced across social media platforms. [sic] The clips were posted after an unintentional release from an international third-party distributor. HBO is aggressively monitoring and removing clips from the internet, and fans can watch the episode in its entirety this Sunday night on HBO and Max."

== Reception ==
=== Ratings ===
In the United States, "The Queen Who Ever Was" was watched by a total of 8.9 million viewers, which included linear viewers during its premiere night on August 4, 2024, both on HBO and Max. While on HBO alone, it was watched by nearly 1.5 million viewers during its first broadcast. This was an increase of 20.5% from the previous episode.

=== Critical response ===
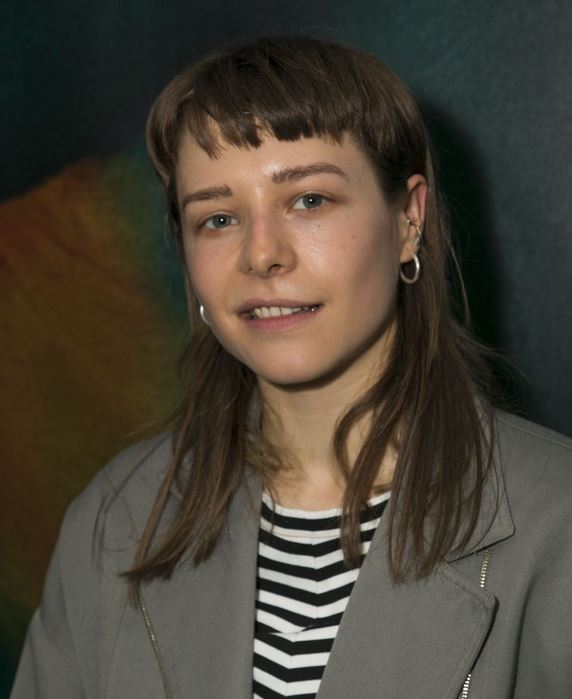
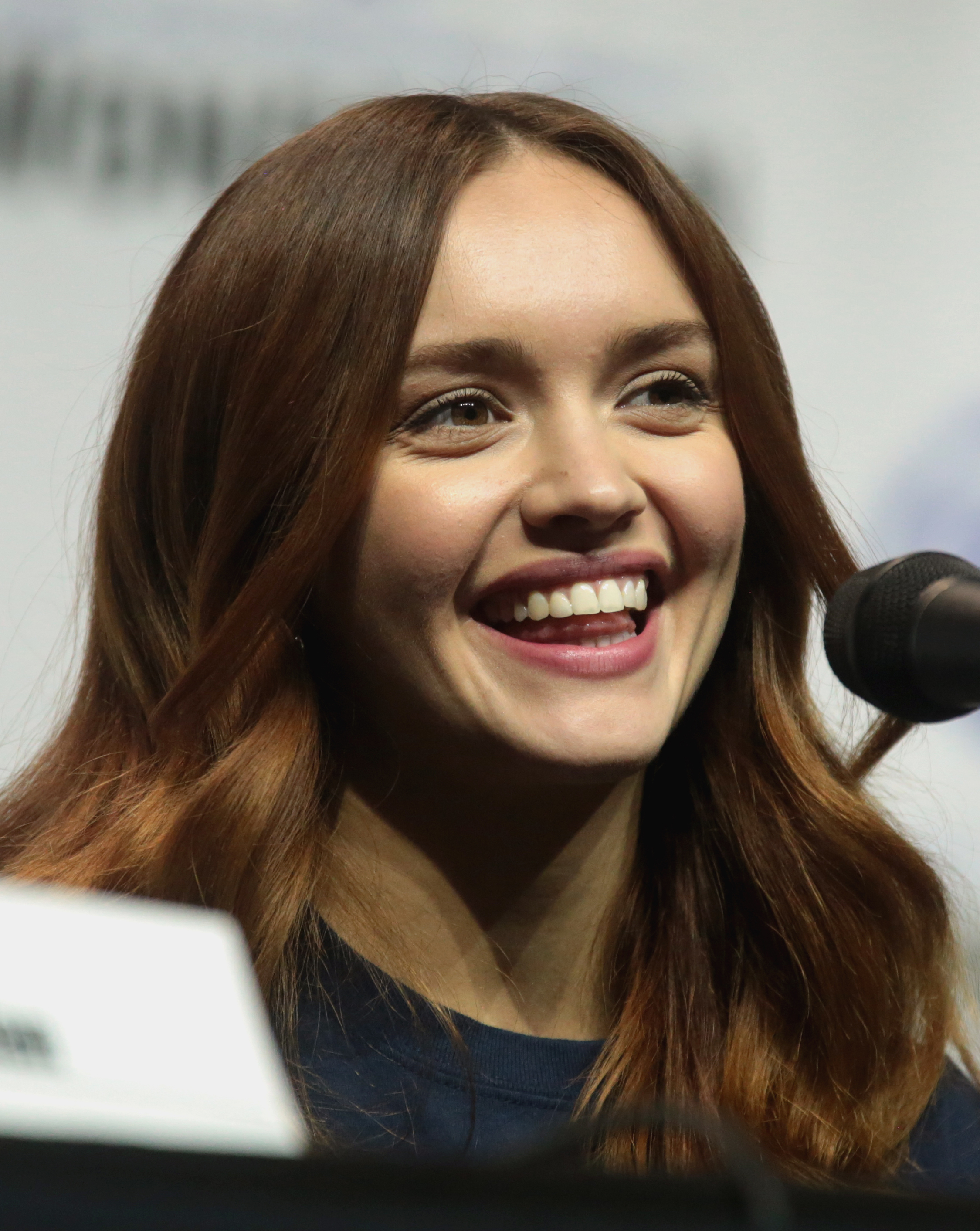
The performances of Emma D'Arcy and Olivia Cooke and their chemistry received critical acclaim.

The episode was met with mixed critical reviews. On the review aggregator Rotten Tomatoes, it holds an approval rating of 46% based on 28 reviews, with an average rating of 6.3/10. The site's critical consensus says, "Ending on a snarl when viewers expected a roar, 'The Queen Who Ever Was' is a bitterly anti-climactic finale that leaves the season feeling more like a tease than a treat." It is the series' lowest-rated episode on the website to date.

Helen O'Hara of IGN and Carly Lane of Collider gave the episode a score of 8 out of 10. O'Hara described it as an episode that "has laboured to move pieces into place and establish character dynamics and deliver some beautifully written dialogue and failed utterly to deliver the hoped-for action alongside it." She added, "In terms of story and drama, this eighth episode was a triumph – or would have been had it arrived two or three episodes ago. But for a season finale to be all cliffhanger and no spectacle is close to unforgivable." Similarly, Lane felt the episode "feels more like a penultimate episode than one designed to wrap up the entire second season, especially given where it leaves off." Despite this, she praised the performances of D'Arcy, Cooke, Frankel, and Salim. Kayleigh Dray of The A.V. Club graded it with a "B+", commending the set-up for the third season and D'Arcy's performance.

Alec Bojalad of Den of Geek, Fay Watson of GamesRadar+ Amanda Whiting of Vulture, and Jonathon Wilson of Ready Steady Cut all rated the episode 3 out of 5 stars. Bojalad appreciated the conclusion to Daemon's storyline in the season, and also wrote, "While still ostensibly an enjoyable watch, [the season finale] is the weakest episode of the series thus far. [...] [Mostly due] to the fact that there's no real conclusion here." Nevertheless, Bojalad still called it a good episode of television in general. Watson praised the introduction of new characters in Essos, Daemon bending his knee to Rhaenyra, and the performances of D'Arcy and Cooke, concluding her review by saying, "Despite some excellent sequences, [the episode] is plagued by the same issues as the rest of the season, focusing on looking ahead rather than offering a satisfying conclusion." Additionally, Whiting called it "a terrible, evasive and deflating" season finale, while Wilson noted "It's a high-quality finale in many respects, but it remains a tease for bigger, more dramatic stuff to come" and praised the performances of D'Arcy, Cooke, and Salim.

Katie Doll of CBR scored it 5 out of 10, stating, "By the end of the well-shot Season 2 finale, the HBO series can no longer hide that its flashy dragon sequences and rich dialogue are just covers for a story lacking substance." She then criticized the callback to Game of Thrones with a brief appearance of Daenerys Targaryen, which she considered the scene "undercuts the purpose of the series." However, she praised Djawadi's score, Collett's performance, and the parallel shots of Alicent and Rhaenyra. Grading it with a "C-", Proma Khosla of IndieWire praised D'Arcy and Salim's performances as well as the final montage but found it lacking as a conclusion to the season.

=== Accolades ===
TVLine named D'Arcy and Cooke the "Performers of the Week" for the week of August 10, 2024, for their performances in the episode. The site wrote, "Cooke's tentative hopefulness as Alicent lays out her plan. D'Arcy’s stiff refusal, tinged with mocking. The way both actors shed layers of formality, emotional scar tissue and self-preserving distance to tap into what their characters actually thought of the other. And don’t get us started on how what’s playing out on D'Arcy's and Cooke’s faces throughout the scene is a master class unto itself... Alicent/Rhaenyra is House of the Dragon's truly tragic, heartbreaking love story. What a treat to watch the latest chapter play out via D'Arcy and Cooke's excellent interpretation."

Year	Award	Category	Nominee	Result	Ref.
2025	American Society of Cinematographers Awards	Outstanding Achievement in Cinematography in Episode of a One-Hour Regular Series	Catherine Goldschmidt	Nominated	
