= House of the Dragon season 2 =

Season of streaming series

House of the Dragon
- Season 2
- Home media cover art
- Showrunner: Ryan Condal
- Starring: Matt Smith; Emma D'Arcy; Olivia Cooke; Rhys Ifans; Steve Toussaint; Eve Best; Fabien Frankel; Matthew Needham; Sonoya Mizuno; Tom Glynn-Carney; Ewan Mitchell; Phia Saban; Harry Collett; Bethany Antonia; Phoebe Campbell; Jefferson Hall; Kurt Egyiawan; Kieran Bew; Abubakar Salim; Tom Taylor; Clinton Liberty; Tom Bennett; Ellora Torchia; Freddie Fox; Gayle Rankin; Simon Russell Beale
- No. of episodes: 8

Release
- Original network: HBO
- Original release: June 16 – August 4, 2024

Season chronology
- ← Previous; Season 1 Next → Season 3

The second season of the American fantasy drama television series House of the Dragon premiered on HBO on June 16, 2024, in the United States and concluded on August 4, 2024. It consists of eight episodes, each of approximately one hour. Like the first season, it covers the events of the book Fire & Blood, a prequel novel in the A Song of Ice and Fire series by George R. R. Martin. The season was ordered on August 26, 2022, five days after the premiere of the series. Miguel Sapochnik, a showrunner on the first season, departed after the season, leaving Ryan Condal as the sole showrunner. The second season was filmed from April to September 2023, filming alongside the 2023 Writers Guild of America strike and the 2023 SAG-AFTRA strike due to its largely British cast working under British Equity rules.

The season follows in the aftermath of the first season's final episodes, in which Aegon II Targaryen was planted on the Iron Throne after the death of his father King Viserys I Targaryen, causing House Targaryen to become divided. Aegon II rules from King's Landing, supported by the Green Council and his mother Alicent Hightower, while his half-sister Rhaenyra Targaryen and the Black Council plot in exile from Dragonstone. Both sides seek allies from the great houses of Westeros, fighting for the support of their armies to claim their rightful positions to the Iron Throne.

House of the Dragon features a large ensemble cast, including established actors such as Matt Smith, Emma D'Arcy, Olivia Cooke, Rhys Ifans, Steve Toussaint, Eve Best, Fabien Frankel, Matthew Needham, and Sonoya Mizuno. Milly Alcock, who portrayed a younger version of D'Arcy's character in the first season, appears in a guest role. Critics praised the character development, visual effects, writing, Ramin Djawadi's score, and performances (particularly Smith, D’Arcy and Cooke). The second season won Best Fantasy Television Series at the Saturn Awards, while Emma D'Arcy earned a Best Actress in a Television Series – Drama nomination. The season premiere was watched by over 7 million viewers across the linear channels and HBO Max upon its release. A third season was ordered in June 2024.

== Episodes ==
No. overall	No. in season	Title	Directed by	Written by	Original release date	U.S. viewers (millions)
11	1	"A Son for a Son"	Alan Taylor	Ryan Condal	June 16, 2024	1.32
At the Wall, Cregan Stark promises Jace 2,000 troops for Rhaenyra's forces. Rhaenys, who secured the Velaryons' shipping blockade of the Gullet, refuses Daemon's command to jointly kill Aemond and Vhagar to avenge Luke. After confirming Luke's death, Rhaenyra demands revenge on Aemond. Aegon II strives to be a benevolent king, but Otto Hightower, his grandfather and Hand, urges restraint regarding the smallfolk to preserve scarce war resources. Aegon brings his precocious young son and heir Jaehaerys to the Small Council for training. Larys exploits Alicent's fears of betrayal. Guilt-ridden over Luke's death, Alicent asks Otto to wage war sparingly. Having survived the brothel fire, Mysaria arrives at Dragonstone and is arrested for treason. Daemon offers her freedom in exchange for help recruiting two assassins. Sneaking into King's Landing, Daemon bribes a ratcatcher called "Cheese" and a City Watch guard nicknamed "Blood" to kill Aemond. Unable to find Aemond in the Red Keep, the two enter Queen Helaena's quarters and instead murder Jaehaerys. Helaena, clutching Jaehaerys' twin sister, Jaehaera, escapes to Alicent's chambers, finding her and Criston Cole having sex.
12	2	"Rhaenyra the Cruel"	Clare Kilner	Sara Hess	June 23, 2024	1.30
Prince Jaehaerys' murder causes chaos; King Aegon hastily assembles his Small Council, wanting revenge on Rhaenyra. Ser Otto suggests a public funeral to tarnish Rhaenyra's image. In the procession, a herald chants, "Rhaenyra the Cruel", as people lining the street express their condolences to Alicent and Helaena. City Watch guard Blood is captured; he confesses to Lord Larys that Daemon hired him and his accomplice, an unknown-to-him ratcatcher. In Dragonstone, Rhaenyra worries her popularity will suffer. Suspecting Daemon ordered Jaehaerys' death if Aemond was absent, Rhaenyra says she no longer trusts him. Daemon then flies to Harrenhal to recruit alliances. Having escaped assassination, Aemond, remorseful over Luke's death, seeks solace at a brothel. Criston orders Arryk to kill Rhaenyra by infiltrating Dragonstone disguised as his twin, Erryk. Rhaenyra grants Mysaria freedom. While departing Dragonstone, Mysaria notices Arryk arriving and notifies a guard. When Arryk enters Rhaenyra's chambers, Erryk bursts in and a fight ensues, ending with Erryk killing his brother. Grief-stricken, Erryk takes his own life. Aegon publicly hangs all ratcatchers, including Cheese, infuriating Otto, who fears a populist revolt. Aegon dismisses Otto as Hand of the King and appoints Criston.
13	3	"The Burning Mill"	Geeta Vasant Patel	David Hancock	June 30, 2024	1.16
In the Riverlands, the feuding Brackens and Blackwoods fight a deadly battle over a minor dispute. To avert war, Rhaenys tells Rhaenyra that Alicent may be reasoned with. Criston proposes a bold plan to conquer Harrenhal; Daemon arrives there first, whereupon Ser Simon Strong, the castellan, pledges allegiance. That night, Daemon dreams that a young Rhaenyra is sewing Jaehaerys' severed head onto his body. Daemon awakens and a strange woman, Alys, foretells his death occurring at Harrenhal. Rhaenyra sends Rhaena, her younger children, and dragon eggs to the Arryns to protect the Targaryen line. Mysaria becomes Rhaenyra's adviser, while Aegon makes Larys his Master of Whisperers. At a brothel, a man named Ulf boasts he is Daemon and King Viserys' bastard half-brother. Arriving at the brothel with his squires, Aegon encounters Aemond with madam Sylvi and cruelly mocks him. After Baela, patrolling on Moondancer, spots Criston's squad en route to Harrenhal, Rhaenyra's councilors urge war with dragons. Instead, Rhaenyra sneaks into King's Landing and secretly meets with Alicent but fails to negotiate a peaceful resolution. She realizes Alicent misunderstood King Viserys' dying words about "Aegon" as concerning Alicent's son Aegon II, not Aegon the Conqueror's dreams.
14	4	"The Red Dragon and the Gold"	Alan Taylor	Ryan Condal	July 7, 2024	1.24
Daemon dreams that he decapitates a young Rhaenyra, who accused him of treason. Grand Maester Orwyle prepares Alicent an abortifacient tea. He professes ignorance about whom Viserys named as heir. Criston beheads Lord Gunthor Darklyn of Duskendale, who refused allegiance. Alys Rivers tells Daemon that Harrenhal is haunted. Her potion causes him to hallucinate seeing his deceased wife, Laena Velaryon. Rhaenyra returns to Dragonstone and agrees to a war using dragons. Rhaenys volunteers herself and her dragon, Meleys. Aegon complains about Aemond and Criston planning battles without him but Alicent dismisses this, says his lacking wisdom and knowledge makes him an inferior king. She advises he can best serve the realm by doing nothing and defer to his advisors. Frustrated and drunk, Aegon flies his dragon, Sunfyre, to Rook's Rest. Rhaenys on Meleys burns Criston's troops while Aemond and Vhagar wait to ambush her. When Aegon and Sunfyre approach, Aemond delays attacking. As Meleys mauls Sunfyre, Aemond flies in and commands Vhagar to burn both dragons. Sunfyre falls with Aegon. Rhaenys and Meleys attack Vhagar, who also falls. As Rhaenys circles above, Vhagar suddenly rises and fatally throttles Meleys, plunging Rhaenys to her death. Criston regains consciousness and finds Aemond, sword drawn, near Aegon, who lies motionless next to the heavily wounded Sunfyre.
15	5	"Regent"	Clare Kilner	Ti Mikkel	July 14, 2024	1.23
Corlys, Rhaenyra and Baela mourn Rhaenys' death. Criston parades Meleys' head through King's Landing, though the near-starving smallfolk consider it a bad omen. Aegon has survived but is comatose and severely burned, while Sunfyre is near-dead; Criston withholds telling Alicent what truly happened at the battle. Daemon dreams of incest with his mother, who calls him her favorite son. The Small Council reject Alicent's bid as regent and elect Aemond, wanting a male and a dragonrider on the throne. Aemond orders the city gates shut, preventing blacksmith Hugh Hammer and his family from fleeing. Jeyne Arryn tells Rhaena she is disappointed she received two hatchlings rather than a mature dragon. At the Twins, Jace obtains the Freys' allegiance in exchange for Harrenhal. Elinda is sent to King's Landing as a spy and agitator. Daemon declares he will be king once a large army is raised; he orders the Blackwoods to ravage the Brackens and forces their fealty. Alys criticizes Daemon's ruthlessness and the riverlords denounce his atrocities. Rhaenyra laments lacking riders for Vermithor and Silverwing, the only dragons large enough to challenge Vhagar; Jace suggests searching other noble houses for Valyrian descendants.
16	6	"Smallfolk"	Andrij Parekh	Eileen Shim	July 21, 2024	1.30
Jason Lannister leads his army to the Golden Tooth. Aemond refuses vassal Humfrey Lefford's request to fly there and provide support. Aemond wants Tyland Lannister to ally with the Triarchy to break the Velaryon blockade. Aemond orders Criston to march on Harrenhal and dismisses Alicent from the Small Council. Ser Steffon Darklyn, a distant Targaryen descendant, attempts to claim Seasmoke and is incinerated. Daemon continues having disturbing dreams and irrationally believes he is being poisoned. Aemond orders Larys to summon Otto Hightower to court. Aegon, slowly recovering, tells Aemond he remembers nothing about the battle. Gwayne Hightower assures Alicent that her youngest son, Daeron, is kind, unlike his brothers. Corlys appoints his illegitimate son, Alyn of Hull, his flagship's first mate. Meanwhile, Alyn's brother, Addam, is pursued by Seasmoke. Mysaria's spies spread rumors that the royals regularly feast while smallfolk starve. Mysaria sends food-laden Targaryen boats to King's Landing. The grateful citizens fight over limited supplies, causing a riot that Alicent and Helaena barely survive. Mysaria tells Rhaenyra that her father sexually abused her and why she is loyal. They passionately kiss. Upon hearing Seasmoke has a new rider, Rhaenyra leaves on Syrax to confront them.
17	7	"The Red Sowing"	Loni Peristere	David Hancock	July 28, 2024	1.22
Rhaenyra confronts Addam of Hull, Seasmoke's new rider, who pledges fealty to her. Alicent retreats to the Kingswood after being dismissed from the Small Council. Larys presses Grand Maester Orwyle to accelerate Aegon's recovery. While departing the Eyrie with the young princes, Rhaena leaves to find the wild dragon. Mysaria tells Rhaenyra to search for Targaryen dragonseeds (bastards with Valyrian blood) in King's Landing as potential dragonriders. The new Lord Paramount, Oscar Tully, offers Daemon allegiance but denounces his nefarious behavior. He demands Daemon's contrition and to mete out justice for allowing war atrocities; Daemon then executes Willem Blackwood for slaughtering the Brackens. Daemon has another vision of Viserys, who asks if he truly wants the crown and its burden. Jace confronts Rhaenyra, arguing that bastard dragonriders could challenge the Targaryens' power and threaten the succession due to his own illegitimate birth. At Rhaenyra's command, Elinda and Alyn deliver the dragonseeds to Dragonstone, Hugh and Ulf among them. Vermithor kills many dragonseeds until Hugh claims him; meanwhile, Ulf claims Silverwing and flies over King's Landing. Aemond pursues him on Vhagar but nearing Dragonstone, he quickly retreats upon seeing Rhaenyra with Syrax, Vermithor, and Silverwing.
18	8	"The Queen Who Ever Was"	Geeta Vasant Patel	Sara Hess	August 4, 2024	1.47
Tyland Lannister recruits the Triarchy as allies, but first successfully defeats Admiral Sharako Lohar in mud-wrestling. Larys proposes that he and Aegon hide in Braavos where Harrenhal's gold is stashed, then reclaim the throne following the war. After long searching, Rhaena finds the wild dragon. Gwayne confronts Criston, who regrets the war. A rage-fueled Aemond destroys Sharp Point with Vhagar. Rhaenyra, who hoped having more dragonriders would deter conflict, declares war. Ulf's boorishness angers Jace. Alyn rebuffs Corlys's reconciliation attempts. Rhaenyra and Addam fly to Harrenhal after Simon Strong sends warning that Daemon may be traitorous. Alys leads Daemon to a weirwood tree where he foresees a future including a White Walker and Daenerys Targaryen; seeing himself as one part in a larger story, he swears fealty to Rhaenyra. Helaena refuses Aemond's demand to fly Dreamfyre into battle and foresees him dying in the war and Aegon reclaiming the throne. Alicent secretly travels to Dragonstone, offering to surrender King's Landing to Rhaenyra in exchange for her and her family's safety; Rhaenyra insists Aegon must die to secure the throne. Otto is glimpsed as a captive in a cell. Armies in the Reach, the North, the Westerlands and the Riverlands (as well as House Velaryon's and the Triarchy's fleets) mobilize for war.

== Cast and characters ==
=== Main ===
- Matt Smith as Daemon Targaryen
- Emma D'Arcy as Rhaenyra Targaryen
  - Milly Alcock portrays young Rhaenyra Targaryen (guest)
- Olivia Cooke as Alicent Hightower
- Rhys Ifans as Otto Hightower
- Steve Toussaint as Corlys Velaryon
- Eve Best as Rhaenys Targaryen
- Fabien Frankel as Criston Cole
- Matthew Needham as Larys Strong
- Sonoya Mizuno as Mysaria
- Tom Glynn-Carney as Aegon II Targaryen
- Ewan Mitchell as Aemond Targaryen
- Phia Saban as Helaena Targaryen
- Harry Collett as Jacaerys "Jace" Velaryon
- Bethany Antonia as Baela Targaryen
- Phoebe Campbell as Rhaena Targaryen
- Jefferson Hall as identical twins: Jason Lannister and Tyland Lannister
- Kurt Egyiawan as Orwyle
- Kieran Bew as Hugh Hammer
- Abubakar Salim as Alyn of Hull
- Tom Taylor as Cregan Stark
- Clinton Liberty as Addam of Hull
- Tom Bennett as Ulf White
- Ellora Torchia as Kat
- Freddie Fox as Gwayne Hightower
- Gayle Rankin as Alys Rivers
- Simon Russell Beale as Simon Strong

=== Recurring ===
- Paul Kennedy as Jasper Wylde
- Luke Tittensor as Arryk Cargyll
- Elliott Tittensor as Erryk Cargyll
- Anthony Flanagan as Steffon Darklyn
- Max Wrottesley as Lorent Marbrand
- Phil Daniels as Gerardys
- Jamie Kenna as Alfred Broome
- Nicholas Jones as Bartimos Celtigar
- Michael Elwyn as Simon Staunton
- James Dreyfus as Gormon Massey
- Barney Fishwick as Martyn Reyne
- Ralph Davis as Leon Estermont
- Tok Stephen as Eddard Waters
- Oscar Eskinazi as Joffrey Velaryon
- Jordon Stevens as Elinda Massey
- Michelle Bonnard as Sylvi
- Vincent Regan as Rickard Thorne
- Maddie Evans as Dyana
- Graeme McKnight as Paxter Strong
- Paul Valentine as Germund Strong
- Eddie Eyre as Axell Bulwer
- Jack Parry-Jones as Willem Blackwood
- Amanda Collin as Jeyne Arryn
- Antonio Magro as Petyr Piper

=== Guest ===
- Sam C. Wilson as Blood
- Mark Stobbart as Cheese
- Samson Kayo as Mujja
- James Doherty as Cley
- Ryan Kopel as Aeron Bracken
- Kieran Burton as Davos Blackwood
- Archie Barnes as Oscar Tully
- Steven Pacey as Gunthor Darklyn
- Nanna Blondell as Laena Velaryon
- Tim Faraday as Amos Bracken
- Aedan Day as Raylon Bracken
- Kenneth Collard as Forrest Frey
- Sarah Woodward as Sabitha Frey
- Emeline Lambert as Alyssa Targaryen
- John-Paul Hurley as Lord Darry
- Anna Francolini as Lady Mallister
- Turlough Convery as Lord Mooton
- Sian Brooke as Aemma Arryn
- Daniel Fathers as Humfrey Lefford
- Paddy Considine as Viserys I Targaryen (uncredited)
- Robert Rhodes as Silver Denys
- Abigail Thorn as Sharako Lohar
- Joshua Ben-Tovim as Brynden Rivers

== Production ==
=== Development ===
On August 26, 2022, less than a week after its premiere, the series was renewed for a second season. On August 31, Miguel Sapochnik stepped down as director and co-showrunner for the second season, but remained an executive producer. Sapochnik stated, "It was incredibly tough to decide to move on, but I know that it is the right choice for me, personally and professionally." Alan Taylor, who directed Game of Thrones episodes, joined in season two and serves as an executive producer and director. Following the second season renewal, Bloys stated that it was expected to premiere in 2024. Hess told Variety in late December 2022 that most of season 2 had been written and would include a revenge plot against Alicent following the events of the first-season finale. The second season consists of eight episodes and premiered on June 16, 2024. On his personal blog in December 2023, Martin stated the third and fourth seasons are being written. A third season was ordered in June 2024.

=== Casting ===
The majority of the cast from the first season returned for the second. In April 2023, Gayle Rankin, Simon Russell Beale, Freddie Fox, and Abubakar Salim were announced to have joined the cast for the second season as Alys Rivers, Simon Strong, Gwayne Hightower and Alyn of Hull, respectively. In December 2023, Tom Taylor, Clinton Liberty, Jamie Kenna, Kieran Bew, Tom Bennett, and Vincent Regan were announced to have joined the cast for the second season as Cregan Stark, Addam of Hull, Alfred Broome, Hugh Hammer, Ulf White and Rickard Thorne, respectively.

=== Filming ===
The second season began filming on April 11, 2023, at Warner Bros. Studios, Leavesden in Watford, England, and moved to Cáceres, Spain on May 18, 2023. The series continued filming throughout the 2023 SAG-AFTRA strike. Despite the show originating in the United States, the largely British cast works under local rules governed by the sister union Equity. Filming wrapped by September 29, 2023.

=== Music ===
Ramin Djawadi returned to compose the score for the second season. The 31-track score album was released by WaterTower Music on August 4, 2024, the day that the season finale premiered.

House of the Dragon: Season 2

Soundtrack album by Ramin Djawadi
- Released: August 4, 2024
- Genre: Soundtrack
- Length: 85:44
- Label: WaterTower Music
- Producer: Ramin Djawadi

Ramin Djawadi soundtrack chronology
Fallout (Original Amazon Series Soundtrack) (2024)	House of the Dragon: Season 2 (2024)	Win or Lose (2025)

No.	Title	Length
1.	"Main Title (from “Game of Thrones”)"	1:45
2.	"End a War Before It Begins"	2:07
3.	"The Whisper Network"	1:33
4.	"Blood and Cheese"	3:38
5.	"A Son for a Son"	2:03
6.	"Indulge in Darkness"	2:14
7.	"Remembering Those Who Came Before"	3:22
8.	"Patience and Restraint"	2:56
9.	"Right to Grieve"	1:18
10.	"Born Together"	4:29
11.	"The Feeling of Betrayal"	2:16
12.	"This Is Our Purpose"	1:20
13.	"Strange Victory"	4:08
14.	"Peace Will Be Restored"	2:42
15.	"A Final Journey"	4:33
16.	"I Do Not Know My Part"	1:05
17.	"A Matter of Honor"	2:33
18.	"Rook’s Rest, Pt. 1"	7:34
19.	"Rook’s Rest, Pt. 2"	5:18
20.	"A Sworn Protector"	2:50
21.	"A Mad Thought"	1:37
22.	"You Know What You Must Do"	2:45
23.	"Our Hope for the Future"	3:00
24.	"Bear the Burden Alone"	2:15
25.	"Claim a Dragon"	2:34
26.	"Stolen Inheritance"	2:05
27.	"Born with Other Names"	1:39
28.	"There Will Be No Mercy"	2:28
29.	"The Triarchy"	0:50
30.	"Fight for Our Queen"	2:03
31.	"All Must Choose"	4:44
Total length:		85:44

== Release ==
=== Broadcast ===
The second season premiered on June 16, 2024. The second-season finale was also leaked online, with HBO releasing a statement stating the leak originated from a "third-party distributor".

=== International broadcast ===
In New Zealand, the series is distributed by Sky's SoHo TV channel and Neon streaming service. In the Philippines, SKY broadcasts the show via its main cable television services and other digital streaming platforms. In India, JioHotstar distributes the show. In the UK, Ireland, Italy, Germany, Austria and Switzerland, the series airs on Sky Atlantic and its accompanying streaming service Now. In Canada, House of the Dragon is available on Bell Media's Crave streaming service and its HBO linear channel. In Australia, the series is available for streaming on Binge and Foxtel.

=== Home media ===
The second season was released on 4K UHD Blu-ray (including a SteelBook special edition), standard Blu-ray, and DVD on November 19, 2024.

== Reception ==
=== Critical response ===
House of the Dragon season 2: Critical reception by episode
Season 2 (2024): Percentage of positive critics' reviews tracked by the website Rotten Tomatoes

On the review aggregation website Rotten Tomatoes, the second season holds an approval rating of 84% based on 283 reviews, with an average rating of 7.55/10. The website's critical consensus reads, "Approaching its dynastic cataclysm with a deliberate stride rather than a charging gallop, House of the Dragon carefully sets up its emotional stakes to make the fiery spectacle all the more scorching." On Metacritic, which uses a weighted average, the second season received a score of 73 out of 100 based on 40 critic reviews, indicating "generally favorable reviews".

=== Viewership ===
Season 2 had a debut of 7.8 million viewers across linear and streaming on its Sunday night premiere, which was a 22% viewership decline from the previous season which had 10 million. In Latin America, viewership was up 30% from season 1. According to Samba TV, viewership for its initial airing of the premiere was watched by 1.3 million U.S. households, compared to 2.6 million for season 1. The series garnered its highest streaming viewership for a particular week during the week of June 17–23, 2024, according to Nielsen, garnering a viewership of 1.23 billion minutes. The viewership of the season steadily increased as further episodes were released, reaching a season-high of 8.9 million viewers across linear and streaming with the final episode. The finale also marked the highest streaming viewership for any episode of the show according to HBO.

=== Accolades ===
House of the Dragon received six Primetime Emmy Awards nominations in 2025, winning one for Primetime Emmy Award for Outstanding Makeup (Non-Prosthetic). In 2025, Emma D'Arcy earned a Best Actress in a Television Series – Drama nomination. The series also won Best Fantasy Television Series at the Saturn Awards in 2025.
