= A Son for a Son =

- House of the Dragon episode
- Episode no.: Season 2 Episode 1
- Directed by: Alan Taylor
- Written by: Ryan Condal
- Cinematography by: P.J. Dillon
- Editing by: Frances Parker
- Original air date: June 16, 2024
- Running time: 58 minutes

Episode chronology
← Previous "The Black Queen"	Next → "Rhaenyra the Cruel"
- House of the Dragon season 2

"A Son for a Son" is the second-season premiere episode of the fantasy drama television series House of the Dragon. The episode was written by series co-creator and showrunner Ryan Condal and directed by executive producer Alan Taylor. It first aired on HBO and Max on June 16, 2024.

The plot directly follows the end of the first season finale, depicting the aftermath of the death of Rhaenyra's second son, Lucerys Velaryon, and his dragon, Arrax, at Storm's End. Rhaenyra finds Arrax's remains and then announces her revenge on Aemond. In response, Daemon, Rhaenyra's uncle-husband, appoints two assassins in King's Landing to kill Aemond. However, the assassins are unable to find Aemond and instead decide to kill King Aegon II's son and heir, Jaehaerys. The episode title refers to Daemon vowing revenge against Aemond for Lucerys' murder.

"A Son for a Son" introduced several new cast members, including Kieran Bew as Hugh Hammer, Abubakar Salim as Alyn of Hull, and Tom Taylor as Cregan Stark. In the United States, the episode gained a viewership of 7.8 million during its premiere night, with 1.3 million viewers on linear television alone. It received highly positive reviews from critics, with praise going towards the writing, character development, set up for the upcoming war, improved pacing and lighting compared to the first season, and performances of its cast, particularly those of Emma D'Arcy and Olivia Cooke.

== Plot ==
At the Wall, Jacaerys treats with Lord Cregan Stark to recruit the North for the Blacks. After Jace's persuasion and reflection on old alliances, Cregan pledges 2,000 men to Rhaenyra's cause. Their meeting is interrupted by a raven delivering news of Lucerys' death. Rhaenyra flies to a small coastal village the Stormlands and upon finding Luke's and his dragon Arrax's remains tangled in a fishing net, she breaks down in tears.

On Driftmark, Corlys meets Alyn of Hull, the sailor who saved his life during a deadly shipwreck in the Stepstones. Corlys thanks Alyn and states that he is indebted to him, and also receives a small custom-made dagger that was meant to honor Luke's ascension to the throne of Driftmark. Rhaenys returns to Dragonstone from patrolling the Gullet to help enforce a shipping blockade of King's Landing. Daemon approaches and demands she accompany him to King's Landing to kill Aemond and his dragon Vhagar to avenge Luke. Rhaenys refuses, saying she only recognizes Rhaenyra's authority and that Rhaenyra needs time to grieve her son.

Mysaria is arrested as a stowaway aboard a smuggler's vessel caught running the blockade. Daemon accuses her of treason for aiding the Greens during their coup. At a Black Council meeting, Rhaenyra returns from the Stormlands and demands revenge against Aemond. Jacaerys arrives shortly after, bringing news of House Starks' and Arryns' support to Rhaenyra and joins his mother in grieving Luke. Daemon offers Mysaria freedom in exchange for helping him recruit assassins in King's Landing.

In King's Landing, Alicent is engaged in an affair with Ser Criston Cole. Aegon brings his young son and heir, Jaehaerys, to a Small Council meeting and, when Ser Tyland Lannister gently restrains a mischievous Jaehaerys, Aegon humiliates him by insisting he give the boy a "pony ride" to which Alicent intervenes. The council discusses war tactics in anticipation of Rhaenyra's response to Aemond killing Lucerys. Later, Alicent is dismayed when Lord Larys Strong reports he has removed all "traitors" within her household and hand-picked their replacements. While aloof to his advisors, Aegon attempts benevolence towards the smallfolk, but Otto instills restraint and firmness to secure needed war resources. Afterwards, Larys privately suggests to Aegon that he appoint him as the new Hand of the King, replacing his father's old servants. Meeting with Otto, Alicent urges limited violence during the conflict. She later visits a sept and prays for the dead, including Lucerys.

Daemon sneaks into King's Landing and meets a City Watch guard nicknamed "Blood", who despises the Hightowers. Blood introduces Daemon to an indebted rat-catcher called "Cheese", who is familiar with the Red Keep's layout. Daemon bribes them to kill Aemond. When Cheese asks what they should do if they can't find Aemond, Daemon simply gives them a wry grin. Upon entering the Red Keep, they fail to locate Aemond, but happen to overhear a drunken Aegon and his cohorts insulting Otto.

While looting the upper floors of the Red Keep, Blood finds Cheese in Queen Helaena's chambers, holding a knife at her throat, her two children, Jaehaerys and Jaehaera sleeping nearby. Discussing whether they should kill Jaehaerys, one mentions Daemon's words, "a son for a son". A terrified Helaena tries to bribe them with her necklace in order for them to leave her children alone, but they take it and threaten her instead. Helaena, after hesitating, points to Jaehaerys' bed. As the two murder the boy and remove his head, Helaena takes Jaehaera and flees to Alicent's chamber where Alicent and Criston are in bed together.

== Production ==
=== Writing ===
"A Son for a Son" was written by showrunner and executive producer Ryan Condal, marking his fifth writing credit for the series, following "The Heirs of the Dragon", "The Rogue Prince", "Second of His Name", and "The Black Queen".

The title of the episode refers to Daemon vowing revenge against his nephew and half brother-in-law, Aemond, for his stepson, Lucerys' murder.

==== Changes from the source materials ====
I mean, just very simply, Maelor has not even born in the storyline. We did have to compress time in season one to make it so that we didn't have to recast every character on screen. We were just recasting the kids, so to speak, as we went along, and part of that meant that Aegon and Helaena's children were younger, as are Daemon and Rhaenyra's children younger at the very end of this, because not as much time passed after their marriages to give time for all these kids to grow up.

— Ryan Condal, June 2024 interview with TVLine

In Fire & Blood, Daemon does not instruct Blood and Cheese to find and kill Aemond. Instead, it remains unclear who the intended target is. Mysaria is also still in King's Landing and she hires Blood and Cheese on Daemon's behalf. Additionally, Helaena has a third child, Maelor, in addition to the twins Jaehaerys and Jaehaera. When Blood and Cheese force her to choose which son to sacrifice, she points to Maelor. Despite this, the outcome in the book is the same as in the episode: Blood ultimately beheads Jaehaerys and leaves everyone else alive. Moreover, the whole incident occurs in Alicent's chamber where she is tied up, gagged, and forced to watch. According to Condal, the exclusion of Maelor is because the twins are depicted as younger than they are in the book. As a result, Maelor has not yet been born in the storyline.

=== Filming ===
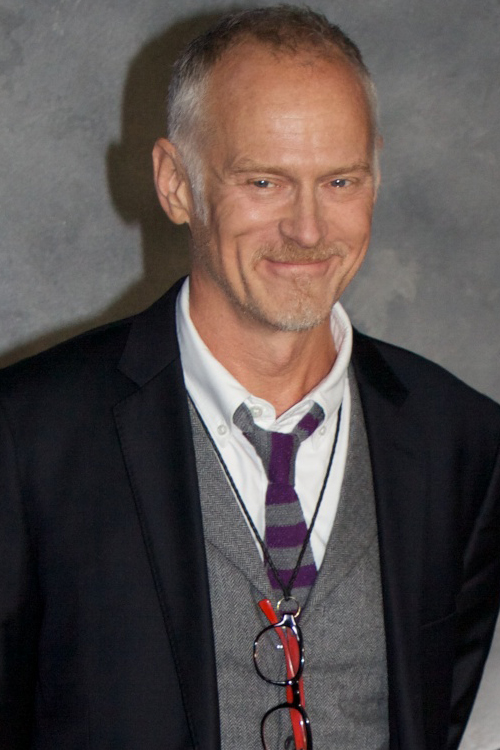
Alan Taylor made his return as director for the franchise.

Principal photography for the second season began in April 2023, at the Warner Bros. Studios, Leavesden in England, and wrapped in September 2023. Among other filming locations, the Trefor Granite Quarry in Wales served as the location for Dragonstone.

The episode was directed by Alan Taylor who joined the show's second season as executive producer. It marks his return to the Game of Thrones franchise and his eighth directorial credit in the franchise. He previously directed the Game of Thrones episodes "Baelor", "Fire and Blood", "The North Remembers", "The Night Lands", "The Prince of Winterfell", "Valar Morghulis", and "Beyond the Wall".

=== Casting ===
The episode stars Matt Smith as Prince Daemon Targaryen, Emma D'Arcy as Queen Rhaenyra Targaryen, Olivia Cooke as Queen Dowager Alicent Hightower, Rhys Ifans as Ser Otto Hightower, Steve Toussaint as Lord Corlys Velaryon, Eve Best as Princess Rhaenys Targaryen, Fabien Frankel as Ser Criston Cole, Matthew Needham as Lord Larys "Clubfoot" Strong, Sonoya Mizuno as Mysaria, Tom Glynn-Carney as King Aegon II Targaryen, Ewan Mitchell as Prince Aemond Targaryen, Phia Saban as Queen Helaena Targaryen, Harry Collett as Prince Jacaerys Velaryon, Bethany Antonia as Lady Baela Targaryen, Phoebe Campbell as Lady Rhaena Targaryen, Jefferson Hall as Ser Tyland Lannister, Kurt Egyiawan as Grand Maester Orwyle, Kieran Bew as Hugh Hammer, Abubakar Salim as Alyn of Hull, and Tom Taylor as Lord Cregan Stark.

It marks the first appearances of Bew, Salim, and Taylor. Additionally, Egyiawan was promoted from a recurring role to the main cast for the second season. Salim's casting was announced in April 2023. Meanwhile, the casting of Bew and Taylor was announced in December 2023.

=== Opening credits sequence ===
The episode introduces a new opening credits sequence, while retaining the original theme song, "Game of Thrones Theme". The sequence depicts past events in the Targaryen family, with Entertainment Weekly describing it as "a Bayeux-style tapestry weaving itself together." Condal explained that the original plan was for the sequence to feel similar to the original series, where geography constantly changes with each episode. However, he felt "that the bloodlines and ancestry story we were telling that season — 20 years of time in season one — had been brought to an end because now the Targaryen ancestry is sort of set. We didn't have much place to go." He decided to make a new sequence to depict that "this is a living history and we want to depict that history in a visual way and give the fans new things to take apart and dive into."

== Reception ==
=== Ratings ===
In the United States, "A Son for a Son" was watched by a total of 7.8 million viewers, which included linear viewers during its premiere night on June 16, 2024, both on HBO and Max. This was a 22% decrease from the first season premiere, which was watched by 10 million viewers. While on HBO alone, it was watched by an estimated 1.3 million viewers during its first broadcast.

=== Critical response ===
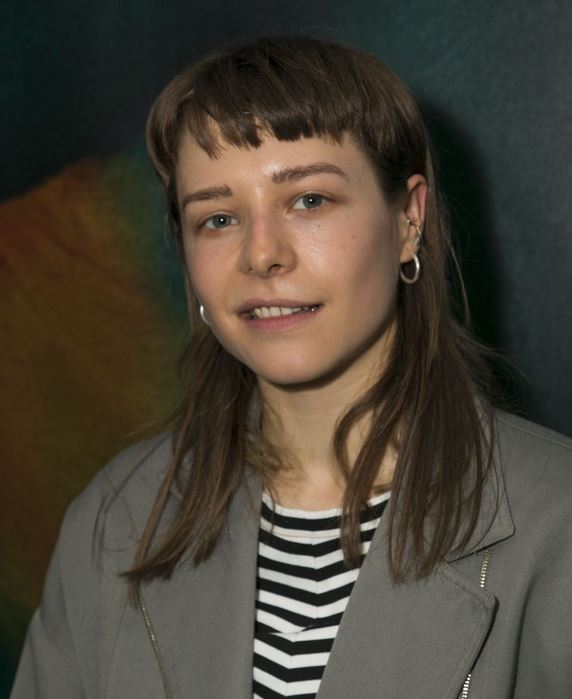
Emma D'Arcy's performance in the episode was widely praised by critics.

The episode was met with highly positive critical reviews. On the review aggregator Rotten Tomatoes, it holds an approval rating of 97% based on 31 reviews, with an average rating of 7.6/10. The site's critical consensus says, "'A Son for a Son' carefully sets the pieces for the oncoming civil war before shockingly flipping the whole board, getting this season off to an unpredictable start."

Alec Bojalad of Den of Geek and Haley Whitmire White of TV Fanatic both gave it a perfect 5 out of 5 stars. Louis Chilton of The Independent and Amanda Whiting of Vulture rated it 4 out of 5 stars, while James Hunt of Screen Rant gave it 3.5 out of 5 stars. Bojalad described it as "a muscular return", and Hunt praised the episode for effectively setting up the upcoming war. Helen O'Hara from IGN scored it 7 out of 10, noting, "We may look back on [the episode] as effective groundwork, but it's undeniably lacking in the kind of excitement that this series can offer at its best." Similarly, Katie Doll of CBR and Carly Lane of Collider also gave it a 7 out of 10. Doll wrote, "With dynamic performances and savvy writing, House of the Dragon is off to an eventful start for Season 2, even if planting the seeds of war can be a chore at times." Lane opined that the episode "feels more like a prologue for much bigger events rather than a first chapter." Kayleigh Dray of The A.V. Club graded the episode a B+ and called it "a pretty stellar season premiere". Erik Kain of Forbes echoed this sentiment, calling it "a brilliant season premiere". Josh Rosenberg of Esquire remarked, "By now, House of the Dragon season 2 is already feeling like a massive step up for the series. The pacing is much better, the side characters are just as compelling as the leads, and it's clear we’re building up to a war."

Critics praised the performances of its cast, particularly those of D'Arcy, Cooke, Saban, Glynn-Carney, and Collett. Regarding D'Arcy, James Hunt wrote, "They did excellent work in season 1, of course, but take it to another level in the season 2 premiere. Rhaenyra's grief is palpable, her pain so clearly etched into every fiber of D'Arcy’s performance." Carly Lane called their performance "magical" and praised their body language in portraying a grieving mother, despite uttering only four words in the episode. Hunt also highlighted Cooke's more nuanced performance, while Lane noted that Cooke "continues to offer depth and dimension to Alicent, who feels torn between clashing loyalties."

Specific scenes singled out by critics included Jacaerys's visit to Winterfell and the introduction of Cregan Stark, though some felt the scene was too brief, as well as the killing of Jaehaerys; critics appreciated the reduced violence in the scene in comparison to the book version. However, Hunt found it underwhelming compared to the book, noting it ended the otherwise solid premiere on a somewhat disappointing note. Additionally, critics lauded the character development of Alicent, Daemon, Aemond, Aegon, and Helaena, as well as the improved lighting, which had been criticized for being too dark in the first season by both critics and fans.
