= Rhaenyra the Cruel =

- House of the Dragon episode
- Episode no.: Season 2 Episode 2
- Directed by: Clare Kilner
- Written by: Sara Hess
- Cinematography by: Alejandro Martínez
- Editing by: Crispin Green
- Original air date: June 23, 2024
- Running time: 69 minutes

Episode chronology
← Previous "A Son for a Son"	Next → "The Burning Mill"
- House of the Dragon season 2

"Rhaenyra the Cruel" is the second episode of the second season of the fantasy drama television series House of the Dragon, a prequel to Game of Thrones. The episode was written by executive producer Sara Hess and directed by Clare Kilner. It first aired on HBO and Max on June 23, 2024.

The plot directly follows the end of the season premiere, depicting the aftermath of the murder of Jaehaerys, King Aegon II's son and heir. In King's Landing, Otto arranges Jaehaerys' funeral to gain the smallfolk's sympathy and frame the murder as being orchestrated by Rhaenyra. Aegon's impulsive action infuriates Otto, leading to a confrontation that results in Aegon dismissing Otto as Hand of the King. Criston sends Arryk to assassinate Rhaenyra. At Dragonstone, Rhaenyra and Daemon argue over his loyalty. Arryk's attempt to kill Rhaenyra ends in his own death and his twin brother Erryk, Rhaenyra's sworn protector, who commits suicide.

"Rhaenyra the Cruel" introduced several new cast members, including Clinton Liberty as Addam of Hull, Tom Bennett as Ulf the White, and Ellora Torchia as Kat. In the United States, the episode garnered a viewership of 1.3 million during its premiere night on linear television alone. It received highly positive reviews from critics, with praise going towards the direction, writing, score, cinematography, camerawork, the fight between Erryk and Arryk, Rhaenyra's argument with Daemon, and performances of its cast, particularly those of Tom Glynn-Carney, Emma D'Arcy, Phia Saban, Rhys Ifans, and Olivia Cooke.

== Plot ==
In the chaos following his son Jaehaerys' murder, an enraged Aegon had a violent breakdown. He hastily assembles his Small Council, wanting revenge on Rhaenyra, though Lord Jasper "Ironrod" Wylde believes she may be innocent. Otto suggests a public funeral to gain the smallfolk's sympathy and alienate them against Rhaenyra. During the funeral procession, the commoners express their condolences to Alicent and Helaena, while a herald calls out Rhaenyra's crimes, dubbing her "Rhaenyra the Cruel". Blood, one of the assassins, is captured and, under threat of torture, quickly confesses to Larys that he acted on Daemon's orders along with a ratcatcher whose real name he does not know. Aegon then enters the cell and bludgeons Blood to death with a mace. Aegon and Helaena fail to reconnect amid their shared grief. Likewise, Alicent is unable to comfort either Aegon or Helaena.

Seeking solace with Sylvi at her brothel, Aemond feels self-important at being Daemon's target, but expresses remorse over Lucerys' accidental death. Elsewhere, blacksmith Hugh Hammer arrives home to his sick daughter and wife, Kat, who blames their worsening situation on the shipping blockade. Ser Criston Cole, deflecting responsibility for failing to protect Jaehaerys, blames Arryk Cargyll, and orders him to infiltrate Dragonstone disguised as his twin, Erryk, and assassinate Rhaenyra. Unable to identify Blood's accomplice, Aegon has all ratcatchers (including Cheese) publicly hanged, infuriating Otto who fears a public backlash. Their heated argument results in Aegon dismissing Otto as Hand of the King and appointing Criston as his replacement. Otto and Alicent discuss how they can manage Aegon. Later, Alicent angrily lashes out at Criston before they have sex.

At Driftmark, Alyn and his brother Addam are reunited. Addam suggests Alyn could climb in rank now that he has Lord Corlys' favor for saving his life. Later, while gathering crabs at the beach, Addam spots Seasmoke, Laenor Velaryon's dragon, flying nearby.On Dragonstone, after receiving word of Jaehaerys' murder and the Greens' accusations, Rhaenyra fears support for her will weaken. Suspecting Daemon for the murder, she demands if he had ordered Jaehaerys' death if Aemond was not found. She also asks if he resents her inheriting the throne rather than himself, then claims she can no longer trust him; an argument ensues, resulting in Daemon departing for Harrenhal to recruit allies.

Rhaenyra sends Baela to scout King's Landing on her dragon, Moondancer. She and Jace discuss their families and future. Rhaenyra interrogates Mysaria regarding her connections to Daemon and the Greens before reluctantly granting her freedom. While departing Dragonstone, Mysaria notices Arryk arriving, and she alerts the guards. Arryk enters Rhaenyra's bedchamber and threatens her. Erryk bursts in and the two engage in a fierce duel. Ser Lorent Marbrand arrives, but, unable to tell the twins apart, cannot aid Erryk. Erryk kills Arryk, saving Rhaenyra, but, overcome with grief from killing his brother, he commits suicide.

== Production ==
=== Writing and filming ===
"Rhaenyra the Cruel" was written by executive producer Sara Hess and directed by Clare Kilner, making it their second collaboration in the series after "The Green Council". The title of the episode refers to the moniker the Greens give to Rhaenyra after they blame Jaehaerys' assassination on her.

The episode also marked Hess' third writing credit, following "The Princess and the Queen" and "The Green Council", and Kilner's fourth time as director for the series after "King of the Narrow Sea", "We Light the Way", and "The Green Council".

Principal photography for the second season began in April 2023 and wrapped in September 2023. The scenes set in the streets of King's Landing were filmed in Cáceres and Trujillo, Spain, in May. The scene where Aegon destroys Viserys' Old Valyrian model was shot in June. For this scene, a 3D-printed version of the model was used, made from a lighter material than the original. Due to the cost of creating the model, Tom Glynn-Carney, who plays Aegon, was required to complete the scene in just one take. Apart from real-life locations, filming also took place on newly built sets, including the interior of Dragonstone castle, designed by production designer Jim Clay. The fight between Ser Erryk and Arryk Cargyll was choreographed by stunt coordinator Rowley Irlam. Drawing on their martial arts backgrounds, Elliott and Luke Tittensor, who play the two brothers, chose to perform the scene themselves, with the exception of the part when Arryk falls onto a vase, which required a stunt double.

=== Casting ===
The episode stars Matt Smith as Prince Daemon Targaryen, Emma D'Arcy as Queen Rhaenyra Targaryen, Olivia Cooke as Queen Dowager Alicent Hightower, Rhys Ifans as Ser Otto Hightower, Steve Toussaint as Lord Corlys Velaryon, Eve Best as Princess Rhaenys Targaryen, Fabien Frankel as Ser Criston Cole, Matthew Needham as Lord Larys "Clubfoot" Strong, Sonoya Mizuno as Mysaria, Tom Glynn-Carney as King Aegon II Targaryen, Ewan Mitchell as Prince Aemond Targaryen, Phia Saban as Queen Helaena Targaryen, Harry Collett as Prince Jacaerys Velaryon, Bethany Antonia as Lady Baela Targaryen, Jefferson Hall as Ser Tyland Lannister, Kurt Egyiawan as Grand Maester Orwyle, Abubakar Salim as Alyn of Hull, Clinton Liberty as Addam of Hull, Tom Bennett as Ulf White, Kieran Bew as Hugh Hammer, and Ellora Torchia as Kat.

It marks the first appearances of Liberty, Bennett, and Torchia. The casting of Liberty and Bennett was announced in December 2023.

== Reception ==
=== Ratings ===
In the United States, "Rhaenyra the Cruel" was watched by an estimated 1.3 million viewers during its first broadcast on HBO alone on June 23, 2024. This was a 1.8% decrease from the previous episode.

=== Critical response ===
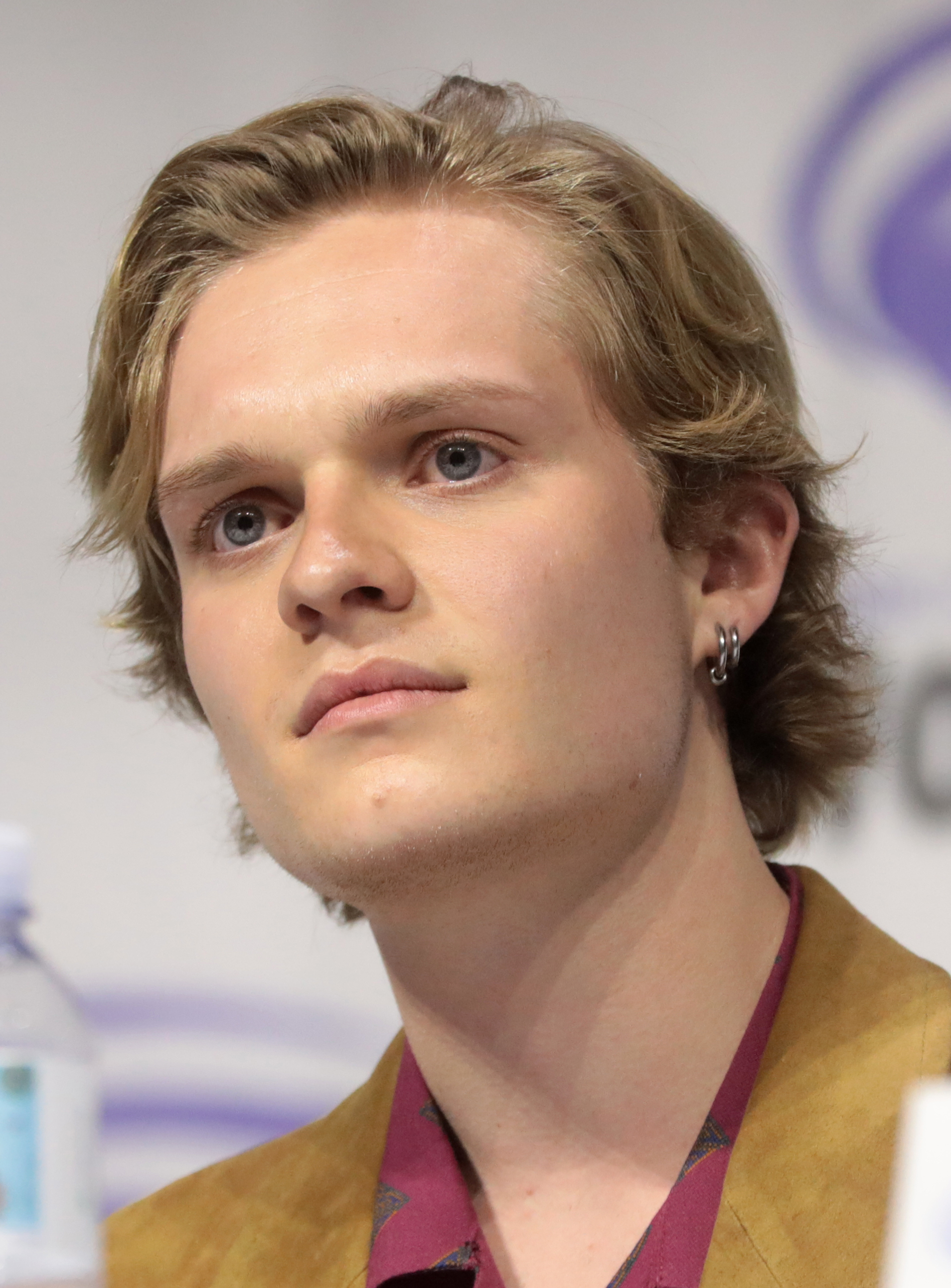
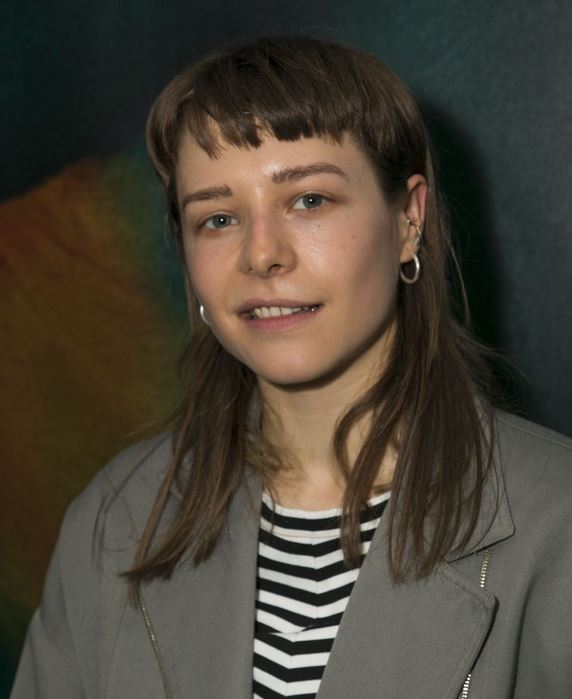
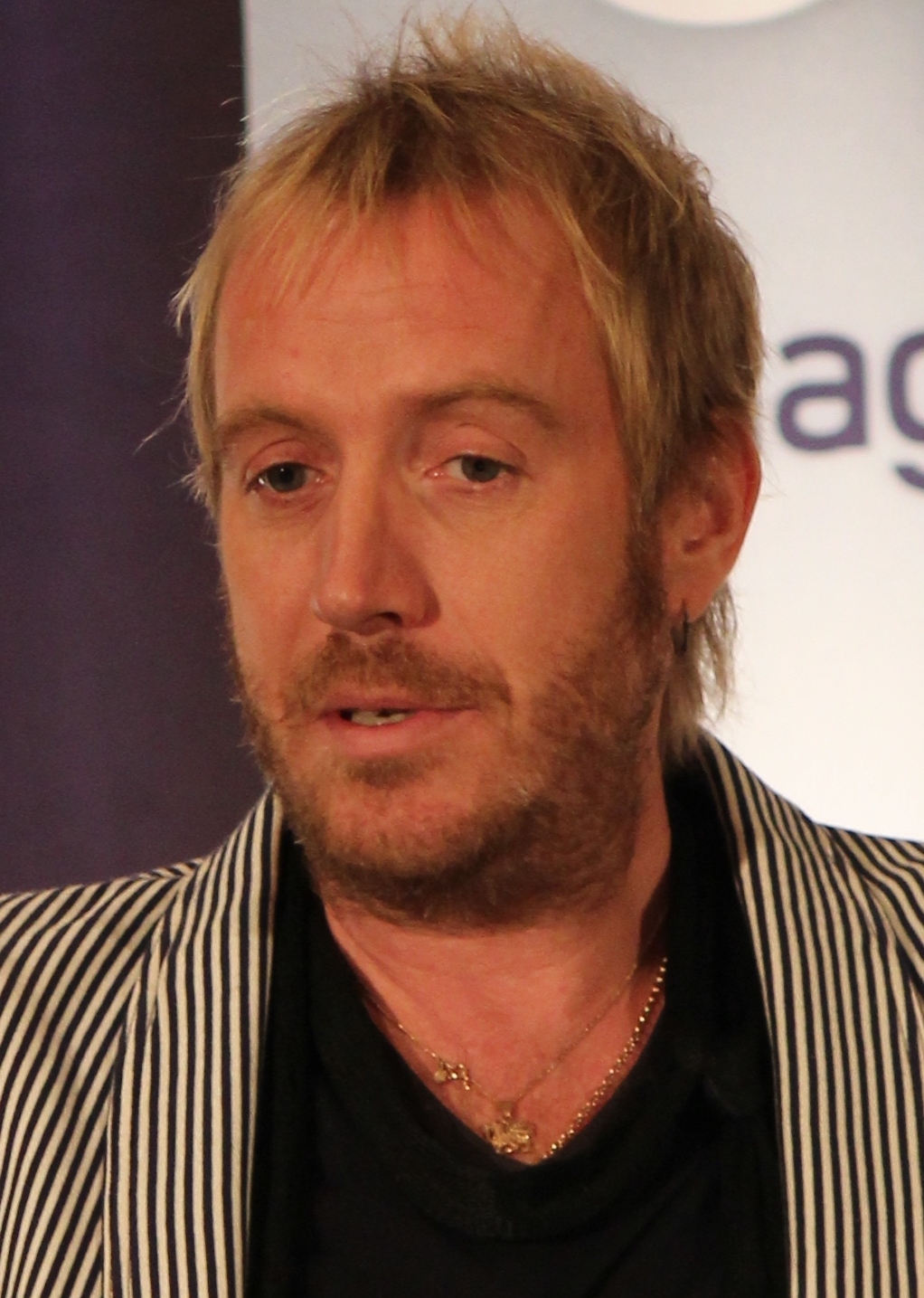
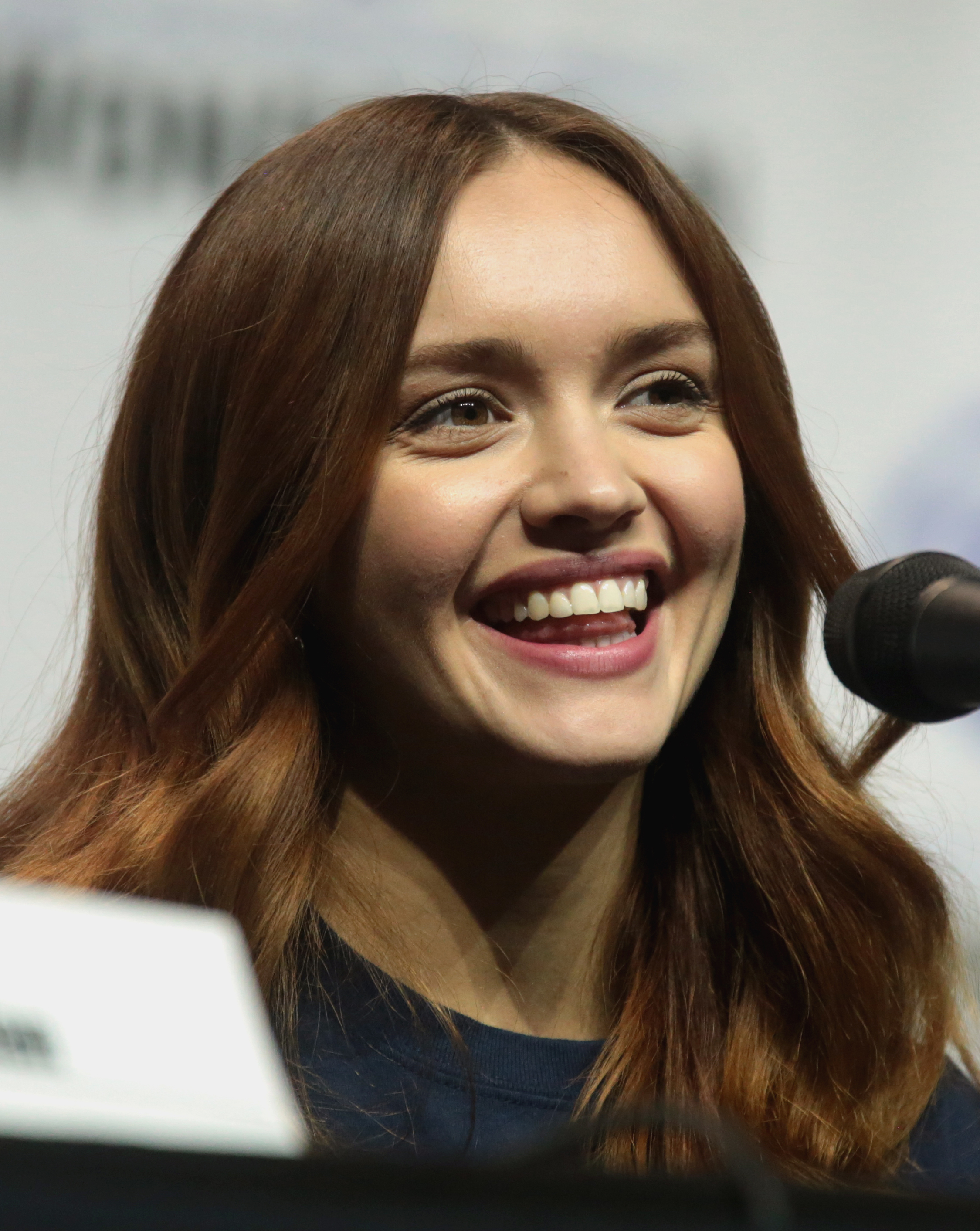
The performances of (top, L to R) Tom Glynn-Carney, Emma D'Arcy, Rhys Ifans, and Olivia Cooke in the episode garnered critical acclaim.

The episode was met with highly positive reviews from critics. On the review aggregator Rotten Tomatoes, it holds an approval rating of 95% based on 22 reviews, with an average rating of 7.7/10. The site's critical consensus says, "An episode punctuated by grief and retribution, 'Rhaenyra the Cruel' deepens House of the Dragon's ensemble with new emotional layers while heaping on memorably bloody countermoves."

Haley Whitmire White of TV Fanatic rated the episode 4.5 out of 5 stars. Alec Bojalad of Den of Geek gave it 4 out of 5 stars, calling it "one of the more thematically-disciplined episodes of the show yet." James Hunt of Screen Rant, who previously found the Blood and Cheese scene disappointing, praised the episode's depiction of its aftermath. He commended the compelling and emotional character work and superb performances, describing it as "another solid installment as the Dance of the Dragons edges closer to truly catching fire." Katie Doll of CBR scored the episode 9 out of 10, stating, "It's clear by the end of this episode that no one is winning this war. House of the Dragon has moved the pieces so that everyone loses in some shape or form. [...] It's invigorating for a fantasy show to humanize itself by exploring all facets of war and its consequences. With a mix of manipulative politics and soul-shattering action sequences, [the series] is on track to be an arresting fantasy war drama." Carly Lane of Collider gave it 8 out of 10, while Helen O'Hara of IGN rated it 7 out of 10, noting it was a "heavy-hearted episode, weighed down by the grief of almost all the main cast." Moreover, Kayleigh Dray of The A.V. Club graded the episode with a "B+", writing, "This episode cleverly builds upon the tensions of the season premiere, weaving in subplots and drama and dragon-sized Easter eggs. [...] It's another beautifully subtle episode, laden with suspense and quiet melancholy."

The performances of the cast received widespread praise from critics, particularly those of Glynn-Carney, D'Arcy, Saban, Ifans, and Cooke. James Hunt highlighted Glynn-Carney's performance as "terrific", especially for showcasing not only showing his acting range but also Aegon's emotional range. He also praised Saban, noting her ability to "[convey] so much with her eyes and [nail] the complexity of a grieving parent", and Ifans, saying that it was "his best performance as Otto to date." Proma Khosla of IndieWire, who graded the episode with a "B", singled out Saban and Glynn-Carney for their outstanding performances, and called Cooke's performance "excellent". Haley Whitmire White and Kayleigh Dray also singled out Glynn-Carney's performance, with White describing his portrayal of a grieving father as "outstanding", and Dray naming him "this week's MVP". Alec Bojalad praised D'Arcy as "one of the show's most elite performers", commending their ability to "[capture] both Rhaenyra's belated understanding of what Daemon really is and her political blindspots in equal measure." Alexandra Bullard of Daily Express specifically praised D'Arcy and Saban, calling the former "magnificent" and the latter "phenomenal".

Critics also highlighted several specific scenes, including the fight between Erryk and Arryk, the argument between Rhaenyra and Daemon, Otto scolding Aegon, and Rhaenyra's interaction with Mysaria. Proma Khosla described the fight as "a magnificent farewell for the Tittensor brothers," calling it "memorable" and "impactful", while Santanu Das of Hindustan Times named it "one of the most brutal and compelling moments of the season so far". Additionally, critics also praised Kilner's direction, Hess' writing, Djawadi's score, Martínez's cinematography, and camerawork.

=== Accolades ===
Year	Award	Category	Nominee	Result	Ref.
2025	American Society of Cinematographers Awards	Outstanding Achievement in Cinematography in Episode of a One-Hour Regular Series	Alejandro Martinez	Nominated	
