= 2024 American Society of Cinematographers Awards =

2025 ceremony awarding excellence in cinematography

39th ASC Awards
- Date: February 23, 2025
- Site: The Beverly Hilton, Beverly Hills
- Hosted by: Ed Helms

The 39th American Society of Cinematographers Awards were held on February 23, 2025, at The Beverly Hilton in Beverly Hills, California, to honor the best cinematographers of film, television and music in 2024. The ceremony was livestreamed through the society's official website. Due to the January Southern California wildfires, the nominations announcement was postponed twice. Originally scheduled to be announced on January 10, 2025, it was moved to January 13. Ultimately, the nominations were announced on January 16.

Lucasfilm President and film producer Kathleen Kennedy received the Board of Governors Award to celebrate her "dedication to visual excellence". Andrzej Bartkowiak, Joan Churchill, Michael Goi, Pete Romano, and John Simmons were all recognized with special achievement awards.

For the second time in ASC history, there were a total of seven nominees for the Theatrical Feature Film category. The number of nominees can vary from five to ten, depending on vote percentage; the last time there were seven was in 2014.

== Winners and nominees ==
Winners are listed first and in bold.

=== Film ===
Theatrical Feature Film	Spotlight Award
**Edward Lachman, ASC – Maria**; Jarin Blaschke – Nosferatu; Alice Brooks, ASC – Wicked; Lol Crawley, BSC – The Brutalist; Stéphane Fontaine, AFC – Conclave; Greig Fraser, ASC, ACS – Dune: Part Two; Phedon Papamichael, ASC, GSC, GCA – A Complete Unknown	**Jomo Fray – Nickel Boys**; Michał Dymek – The Girl with the Needle; Klaus Kneist and Renata Mwende – Nawi

=== Television ===
Episode of a One-Hour Regular Series	Episode of a Half-Hour Series
**Sam McCurdy, ASC, BSC – Shōgun for "Crimson Sky" (FX)**; Adriano Goldman, ASC, ABC, BSC – The Crown for "Sleep, Dearie Sleep" (Netflix); Catherine Goldschmidt, BSC – House of the Dragon for "The Queen Who Ever Was" (HBO); Baz Irvine, BSC, ISC – Silo for "The Engineer" (Apple TV+); Alejandro Martinez, AMC – House of the Dragon for "Rhaenyra the Cruel" (HBO); Christopher Ross, BSC – Shōgun for "Anjin" (FX)	**Richard Rutkowski, ASC – Sugar for "Starry-Eyed" (Apple TV+)**; Adam Bricker, ASC – Hacks for "Just for Laughs" (Max); Carl Herse – The Franchise for "Scene 31A: Tecto Meets Eye" (HBO); Seamus Tierney – Emily in Paris for "Masquerade" (Netflix); Kyle Wullschleger – Only Murders in the Building for "Once Upon a Time in the West" (Hulu)
Limited or Anthology Series or Motion Picture Made for Television
**Robert Elswit, ASC – Ripley for "V Lucio" (Netflix)**; Adam Arkapaw, ACS – Masters of the Air for "Part Three" (Apple TV+); Michael Berlucchi – Interior Chinatown for "Generic Asian Man" (Hulu); Jonathan Freeman, ASC – The Penguin for "Homecoming" (HBO); Emmanuel Lubezki, ASC, AMC and Bruno Delbonnel, AFC, ASC – Disclaimer for "Episode I" (Apple TV+); Zoë White, ACS – Hold Your Breath (Hulu)

=== Other media ===
Documentary Award	Music Video Award
**Michael Dweck and Gregory Kershaw – Gaucho Gaucho**; Michael Crommett – Photographer: Dan Winters Life is Once. Forever.; Andrey Stefanov – Porcelain War	**Pepe Avila del Pino, AMC – "313" (performed by Residente, Sílvia Pérez Cruz, and Penélope Cruz)**; Scott Cunningham, ASC – "Rebound" (performed by Jennifer Lopez); Rodrigo Prieto, ASC, AMC – "Fortnight" (performed by Taylor Swift, featuring Post Malone)
