= Hans Christian Andersen: My Life as a Fairytale =

2002 American television miniseries

- Based on: The Fairy Tale of My Life by Hans Christian Andersen
- Teleplay by: Kit Hesketh-Harvey
- Directed by: Philip Saville
- Starring: Kieran Bew; Emily Hamilton; Flora Montgomery; Simon Callow; James Fox
- Composers: Jan Tilman Schade; Debbie Wiseman
- Country of origin: United States
- Original language: English

Production
- Producers: Davina Belling; Paul Lowin; Clive Parsons
- Cinematography: John Kenway
- Editor: Alex Mackie
- Running time: 174 minutes

Original release
- Network: Hallmark Channel
- Release: September 8, 2002

Hans Christian Andersen: My Life as a Fairytale is a 2002 semi-biographical television miniseries that fictionalizes the young life of Danish author Hans Christian Andersen. It was directed by Philip Saville and starred Kieran Bew as the title character. Four Hans Christian Andersen fairytales are included as short interludes of the story, and intertwined into the events of the young author's life.

== Cast ==
- Kieran Bew as Hans Christian Andersen/The Little Mermaid's Prince/Kai
- Emily Hamilton as Jette/The Little Mermaid/Gerda
- Flora Montgomery as Jenny Lind/The Snow Queen
- Simon Callow as Charles Dickens
- Edward Atterton as Prince Christian of Denmark
- Miranda Pleasence as Gypsy Washerwoman/The Sea Witch
- Mathieu Carrière as Otto Goldschmidt
- Joe Prospero as Francis Dickens
- Charlie Hicks as Edward Dickens
- James Fox as Jonas Collin

== Fairytales featured ==
- The Little Match Girl
- Thumbelina
- The Princess and the Pea
- The Nightingale
- The Tinderbox
- The Little Mermaid
- The Steadfast Tin Soldier
- The Ugly Duckling
- The Snow Queen
