= Tom Taylor (actor) =

English actor (born 2001)

- Born: Thomas Joseph Taylor; 16 July 2001 (age 25); Surrey, England
- Occupation: Actor
- Years active: 2013–present

Thomas Joseph Taylor (born 16 July 2001) is an English actor. He is known for his performance as Jake Chambers in The Dark Tower and Tom Foster in the BBC One drama Doctor Foster. He has been cast as Cregan Stark in the second season of the HBO series House of the Dragon.

== Early life ==
Thomas Joseph Taylor was born on 16 July 2001 in Surrey, England, one of seven children and a twin. He stopped attending drama school in 2013 until his former teacher, Rachel Bell of The Secret Stage School in Camberley, told him an agent was coming to the school for interviews. Taylor auditioned and was signed with his first agent at the age of 12.

== Career ==
Taylor made his acting debut in an episode of Casualty in 2014. He later appeared in two series of Doctor Foster (2015) and in an episode of The Last Kingdom.

Taylor won the role of Jake Chambers in The Dark Tower in March 2016 after a worldwide casting. He was set to reprise the role in a television series based on the fourth volume of The Dark Tower book series. However, the production of that TV series will be a reboot with no connection to the film due to its financial and critical result.

In 2023, Taylor was cast as Lord Cregan Stark in season 2 of House of the Dragon.

== Filmography ==
| Year | Title | Role | Notes |
|---|---|---|---|
| 2014 | Casualty | Tristan Miles | Episode "Born Lucky" |
| 2015–2017 | Doctor Foster | Tom Foster | Main Role |
| 2015 | The Last Kingdom | Young Uhtred | Episode 1 |
| 2015 | Legends | Young Martin | Series 2, Episodes 1 and 2 |
| 2017 | The Dark Tower | Jake Chambers | |
| 2019 | The Kid Who Would Be King | Lance | |
| 2020 | Us | Albie Petersen | 4 episodes |
| 2021 | Close to Me | Finn Harding | |
| 2023 | The Bay | Matt Metcalf | Series 4 |
| 2023 | Love at First Sight | Luther Jones | |
| 2024 | House of the Dragon | Cregan Stark | Episode: "A Son for a Son" |
| 2026 | Good Luck, Have Fun, Don't Die | Tim | |
