= House of the Dragon =

American fantasy TV series

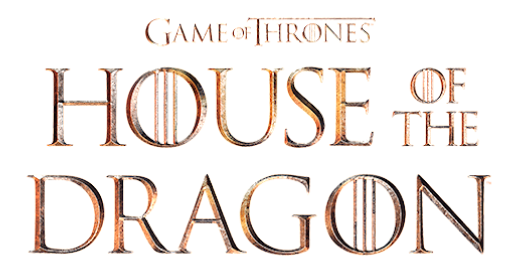
- Genre: Action; Adventure; Fantasy; Serial drama
- Created by: Ryan Condal; George R. R. Martin
- Based on: Fire & Blood by George R. R. Martin
- Showrunners: Ryan Condal; Miguel Sapochnik
- Starring: Paddy Considine; Matt Smith; Emma D'Arcy; Rhys Ifans; Steve Toussaint; Eve Best; Sonoya Mizuno; Fabien Frankel; Milly Alcock; Emily Carey; Graham McTavish; Matthew Needham; Jefferson Hall; Olivia Cooke; Harry Collett; Tom Glynn-Carney; Ewan Mitchell; Bethany Antonia; Phoebe Campbell; Phia Saban; Kurt Egyiawan; Kieran Bew; Abubakar Salim; Tom Taylor; Clinton Liberty; Tom Bennett; Ellora Torchia; Freddie Fox; Gayle Rankin; Simon Russell Beale; James Norton; Joplin Sibtain; Tommy Flanagan; Dan Fogler; Benjamin Evan Ainsworth
- Theme music composer: Ramin Djawadi
- Opening theme: "Game of Thrones Theme"
- Composer: Ramin Djawadi
- Country of origin: United States
- Original language: English
- No. of seasons: 3
- No. of episodes: 26

Production
- Executive producers: Miguel Sapochnik; Ryan Condal; George R. R. Martin; Ron Schmidt; Jocelyn Diaz; Sara Hess; Vince Gerardis; Alan Taylor
- Producers: Karen Wacker; Angus More Gordon; Alexis Raben; Gabe Fonseca; Kevin Lau
- Production locations: Portugal; United Kingdom; Spain; United States
- Cinematography: Fabian Wagner; Pepe Avila del Pino; Alejandro Martínez; Catherine Goldschmidt
- Editors: Tim Porter; Selina MacArthur; Crispin Green; Chris Hunter
- Running time: 54–71 minutes
- Production companies: GRRM; Bastard Sword; 1:26 Pictures Inc.; HBO Entertainment

Original release
- Network: HBO
- Release: August 21, 2022 – present

Related
- Game of Thrones franchise

House of the Dragon is an American fantasy drama television series created by George R. R. Martin and Ryan Condal for HBO. A prequel to Game of Thrones (2011–2019), it is the second television series in the Game of Thrones franchise. Based on parts of Martin's 2018 book Fire & Blood, the series begins about 100 years after the Seven Kingdoms are united by the Targaryen conquest, nearly 200 years before the events of Game of Thrones, and 172 years before the birth of Daenerys Targaryen. Featuring an ensemble cast, the show portrays the events leading up to the decline of House Targaryen, a devastating war of succession known as the "Dance of the Dragons".

House of the Dragon received a straight-to-series order in October 2019, with Ryan Condal and Miguel Sapochnik serving as showrunners. The series premiered on August 21, 2022, with the first season consisting of ten episodes. The series was renewed for a second season five days after its premiere. Sapochnik departed as showrunner after the first season, leaving Condal as the sole showrunner for the second season. The second season premiered on June 16, 2024, with eight episodes. The series was renewed for a third season in June 2024, which premiered on June 21, 2026, and consists of eight episodes. A fourth and final season is in development and expected to be released in 2028.

The premiere of House of the Dragon was watched by over 10 million viewers across the linear channels and HBO Max on the first day, the biggest in HBO's history. The series has received positive reviews. It won a Golden Globe Award for Best Television Series – Drama, while Emma D'Arcy earned two nominations for Best Actress in a Television Series – Drama. It earned nine Emmy Award nominations, including Outstanding Drama Series, and won three British Academy Television Craft Awards.

== Cast and characters ==
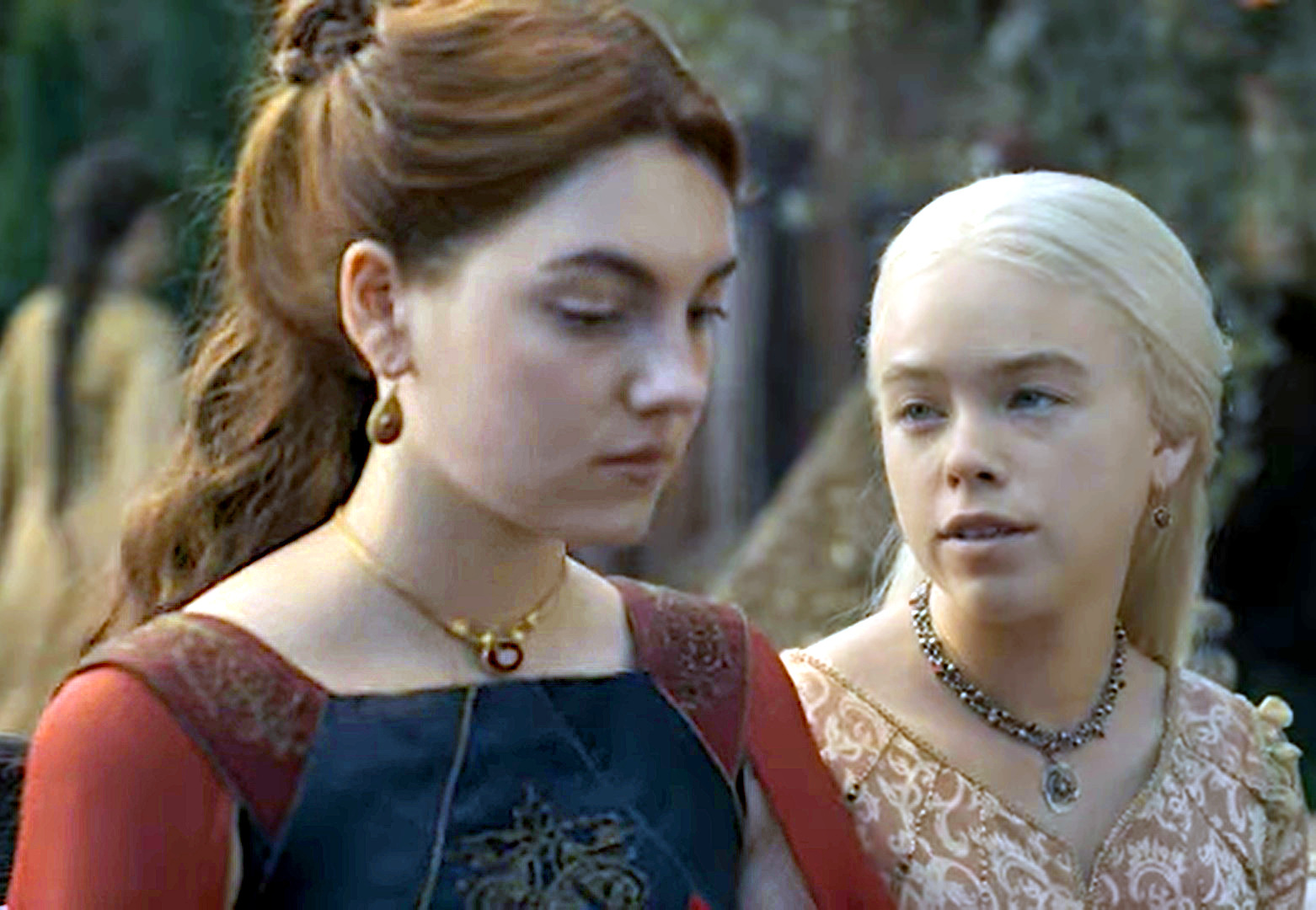
Milly Alcock (right) as young Rhaenyra Targaryen and Emily Carey (left) as young Alicent Hightower

- Paddy Considine as Viserys I Targaryen (season 1; uncredited season 2): The fifth king of the Seven Kingdoms. Known as "a warm, kind, and decent man", Viserys was chosen by a council of lords to succeed his grandfather, Jaehaerys I Targaryen, as king. Viserys is the firstborn son of Jaehaerys's second son Baelon Targaryen and his sister-wife Alyssa Targaryen. He is a former dragonrider who was bonded to the dragon Balerion, also known as "The Black Dread", and was its last rider before its death.
- Matt Smith as Daemon Targaryen: The younger brother of Viserys and uncle/second husband of Rhaenyra Targaryen. Known as the "Rogue Prince" for his unpredictable behavior, Daemon is a fierce warrior and wields the Valyrian steel sword Dark Sister. He is a formidable dragonrider who is bonded to the dragon Caraxes, also known as the "Blood Wyrm".
- Emma D'Arcy as Rhaenyra Targaryen: Viserys's daughter and heir apparent, the firstborn and only surviving child of Viserys and his first wife, Aemma Arryn. She was praised as the "Realm's Delight" during her youth. She is crowned queen by her supporters, the "Blacks", after her step-mother and former friend, Alicent Hightower, usurped the throne for her own son – Rhaenyra's half-brother – , by claiming that Viserys changed his successor with his dying breath. She is a dragonrider who is bonded to the dragon Syrax.
  - Milly Alcock (season 1; guest season 2) portrays a younger version of the character.
- Rhys Ifans as Otto Hightower (seasons 1–2; uncredited season 3): Alicent's father and Viserys's Hand of the King. He continues to hold his position under Aegon II Targaryen until being replaced by Criston Cole. When his daughter became queen, Otto began plotting to put her eldest son Aegon on the Iron Throne, instead of Rhaenyra.
- Steve Toussaint as Corlys Velaryon: The Lord of Driftmark and head of House Velaryon, one of the wealthiest and most powerful families in the Seven Kingdoms. Known as "the Sea Snake", he is the most famous seafarer in Westerosi history. He serves as Viserys's Master of Ships until his resignation and later serves as Rhaenyra's Hand of the Queen.
- Eve Best as Rhaenys Targaryen (seasons 1–2): Viserys and Daemon's cousin and the wife of Corlys. Rhaenys is the only child of Aemon Targaryen, Jaehaerys's late heir apparent and oldest son, and Jocelyn Baratheon, Jaehaerys's half-sister. Known as the "Queen Who Never Was", she was once a candidate to succeed her grandfather as ruler of the Seven Kingdoms but was passed over in favor of her younger cousin Viserys due to her gender. She is a formidable dragonrider who is bonded to the dragon Meleys, also known as the "Red Queen".
- Sonoya Mizuno as Mysaria: A foreign-born brothel dancer who rose to become Daemon's paramour and most trusted confidante until they parted ways. She is later known as the "White Worm" and commands a network of spies throughout King's Landing and serves as Rhaenyra's Mistress of Whisperers.
- Fabien Frankel as Criston Cole (seasons 1–3): A skilled common-born swordsman from the Dornish Marches, who is hand-picked by Rhaenyra to become a member of Viserys's Kingsguard. He later replaces Harrold Westerling as Lord Commander of the Kingsguard following Aegon's ascension, and also replaces Otto as Aegon's Hand of the King.
- Olivia Cooke as Alicent Hightower: Rhaenyra's childhood companion and later the second wife and queen consort of Viserys. She is raised in the Red Keep as part of the King's inner circle and is known as the comeliest woman in the court.
  - Emily Carey (season 1) portrays a younger version of the character.
- Graham McTavish as Harrold Westerling (season 1): A seasoned knight of the Kingsguard who has served the Crown since the reign of Jaehaerys. He replaces Ryam Redwyne as the Lord Commander of the Kingsguard and later resigns from his position following Aegon's ascension.
- Matthew Needham as Larys Strong: The younger son of Lyonel Strong, he is known as "Clubfoot" due to a birth abnormality that causes him to walk with a limp. He is Alicent's trusted confidant and serves as the Lord Confessor and later Aegon's Master of Whisperers. He also succeeds his father as Lord of Harrenhal and head of House Strong.
- Jefferson Hall as identical twins:
  - Jason Lannister (seasons 1–3): The Lord of Casterly Rock, head of House Lannister and Warden of the West. An arrogant hunter and a warrior, he unsuccessfully vies for Rhaenyra's hand.
  - Tyland Lannister: Jason's younger twin brother and a cunning politician. He replaces Corlys as Viserys's Master of Ships and later switches position to replace Lyman Beesbury as Aegon's Master of Coin.
- Harry Collett as Jacaerys ("Jace") Velaryon (seasons 1–3): The firstborn son of Rhaenyra and her first husband, Laenor Velaryon, and Rhaenyra's heir apparent. He is a dragonrider who is bonded to the young dragon Vermax.
- Tom Glynn-Carney as Aegon II Targaryen: The sixth king of the Seven Kingdoms. He is the firstborn son of Viserys and Alicent, half-brother to Rhaenyra, and husband to his sister-wife Helaena Targaryen. Despite the best efforts of his mother, his hedonism and depravity are legendary in King's Landing's Street of Silk. He is crowned king after his supporters, the "Greens", plotted to have him usurp the throne. He is a dragonrider who is bonded to the young dragon Sunfyre.
- Ewan Mitchell as Aemond Targaryen: The thirdborn child and second son of Viserys and Alicent. He is known as "Aemond One-Eye" after losing his left eye in a brawl with his nephews and has grown to become a fearsome and aggressive warrior. He aspires to be a dragonrider and later claims the old dragon Vhagar, also known as the "Queen of All Dragons".
- Bethany Antonia as Baela Targaryen: The elder daughter of Daemon and Laena Velaryon. She is a dragonrider who is bonded to the young dragon Moondancer.
- Phoebe Campbell as Rhaena Targaryen: The younger daughter of Daemon and Laena. She later becomes a dragonrider after claiming the wild dragon Sheepstealer.
- Phia Saban as Helaena Targaryen (seasons 1–3): The secondborn child and only daughter of Viserys and Alicent, sister-wife of Aegon, and mother to his children. She has a unique interest in bugs and often speaks in cryptic prophetic language. She is a dragonrider who is bonded to the dragon Dreamfyre.
- Kurt Egyiawan as Orwyle (season 2–present; recurring season 1): A maester of the Citadel who replaces Mellos as Viserys's Grand Maester and continues to hold his position under Aegon and later under Rhaenyra.
- Kieran Bew as Hugh Hammer (season 2–present): A blacksmith from King's Landing who struggles to care for his sick daughter. He later reveals himself to be a Targaryen bastard, the son of Saera Targaryen, a daughter of Jaehaerys. He later becomes a dragonrider after claiming the dragon Vermithor, also known as "The Bronze Fury".
- Abubakar Salim as Alyn of Hull (season 2–present): Corlys's bastard son and a sailor in the Velaryon fleet who saved his father's life in the Stepstones.
- Tom Taylor as Cregan Stark (season 2): The young Lord of Winterfell, head of House Stark and Warden of the North.
- Clinton Liberty as Addam of Hull (season 2–present): Corlys's bastard son, Alyn's younger brother, and a shipwright in the Velaryon fleet. He later becomes a dragonrider after he is pursued by the dragon Seasmoke, who chooses Addam to be his dragonrider.
- Tom Bennett as Ulf White (season 2–present): A denizen of King's Landing who claims to be a Targaryen bastard and the half-brother of Viserys and Daemon. He later becomes a dragonrider after claiming the dragon Silverwing.
- Ellora Torchia as Kat (seasons 2–3): Hugh's wife and mother to their daughter.
- Freddie Fox as Gwayne Hightower (season 2–present): The son of Otto and older brother of Alicent.
- Gayle Rankin as Alys Rivers (season 2–present): A mysterious witch at Harrenhal in service to House Strong.
- Simon Russell Beale as Simon Strong (seasons 2–3): The great-uncle of Larys and the castellan of Harrenhal.
- James Norton as Ormund Hightower (season 3): The Lord of Oldtown and head of House Hightower and cousin of Alicent and Gwayne.
- Joplin Sibtain as Jon Roxton (season 3): A knight of House Roxton serving under Ormund.
- Tommy Flanagan as Roderick Dustin (season 3): The Lord of Barrowton and head of House Dustin. He also serves as the leader of the Winter Wolves, an army of aging men from the North who expect to die in combat.
- Dan Fogler as Torrhen Manderly (season 3): A knight of House Manderly who serves as Rhaenyra's Master of Coin.
- Benjamin Evan Ainsworth as Daeron Targaryen (season 3): The youngest child of Viserys and Alicent who serves as Ormund's ward. He is a dragonrider who is bonded to the young dragon Tessarion.

== Episodes ==
Season	Episodes	Originally released	
Season	Episodes	First released	Last released
1	10	August 21, 2022	October 23, 2022
2	8	June 16, 2024	August 4, 2024
3	8	June 21, 2026	August 9, 2026

=== Season 1 (2022) ===
No. overall	No. in season	Title	Directed by	Written by	Original release date	U.S. viewers (millions)
1	1	"The Heirs of the Dragon"	Miguel Sapochnik	Ryan Condal	August 21, 2022	2.17
2	2	"The Rogue Prince"	Greg Yaitanes	Ryan Condal	August 28, 2022	2.26
3	3	"Second of His Name"	Greg Yaitanes	Gabe Fonseca & Ryan Condal	September 4, 2022	1.75
4	4	"King of the Narrow Sea"	Clare Kilner	Ira Parker	September 11, 2022	1.81
5	5	"We Light the Way"	Clare Kilner	Charmaine DeGraté	September 18, 2022	1.83
6	6	"The Princess and the Queen"	Miguel Sapochnik	Sara Hess	September 25, 2022	1.86
7	7	"Driftmark"	Miguel Sapochnik	Kevin Lau	October 2, 2022	1.88
8	8	"The Lord of the Tides"	Geeta Vasant Patel	Eileen Shim	October 9, 2022	1.73
9	9	"The Green Council"	Clare Kilner	Sara Hess	October 16, 2022	1.56
10	10	"The Black Queen"	Greg Yaitanes	Ryan Condal	October 23, 2022	1.85

=== Season 2 (2024) ===
No. overall	No. in season	Title	Directed by	Written by	Original release date	U.S. viewers (millions)
11	1	"A Son for a Son"	Alan Taylor	Ryan Condal	June 16, 2024	1.32
12	2	"Rhaenyra the Cruel"	Clare Kilner	Sara Hess	June 23, 2024	1.30
13	3	"The Burning Mill"	Geeta Vasant Patel	David Hancock	June 30, 2024	1.16
14	4	"The Red Dragon and the Gold"	Alan Taylor	Ryan Condal	July 7, 2024	1.24
15	5	"Regent"	Clare Kilner	Ti Mikkel	July 14, 2024	1.23
16	6	"Smallfolk"	Andrij Parekh	Eileen Shim	July 21, 2024	1.30
17	7	"The Red Sowing"	Loni Peristere	David Hancock	July 28, 2024	1.22
18	8	"The Queen Who Ever Was"	Geeta Vasant Patel	Sara Hess	August 4, 2024	1.47

=== Season 3 (2026) ===
No. overall	No. in season	Title	Directed by	Written by	Original release date	U.S. viewers (millions)
19	1	"Salt and Sea, Fire and Blood"	Loni Peristere	Ryan Condal	June 21, 2026	0.86
20	2	"Queen's Landing"	Clare Kilner	Sara Hess	June 28, 2026	0.97
21	3	"Rhaenyra Triumphant"	Clare Kilner	Sara Hess	July 5, 2026	0.89
22	4	"Tumbleton"	Clare Kilner	David Hancock	July 12, 2026	0.92
23	5	"Unbowed and Unbent"	Nina Lopez-Corrado	Philippa Goslett	July 19, 2026	0.95
24	6	"Faceless Men"	Loni Peristere	David Hancock & Shyam Popat	July 26, 2026	0.98
25	7	"The Dragon in Winter"	Nina Lopez-Corrado	Philippa Goslett & Zenzele Price	August 2, 2026	0.79
26	8	"The Treasons at Tumbleton"	Andrij Parekh	Ryan Condal & Ti Mikkel	August 9, 2026	1.14

== Production ==
=== Development ===
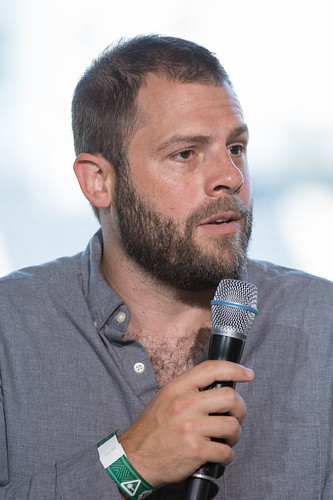
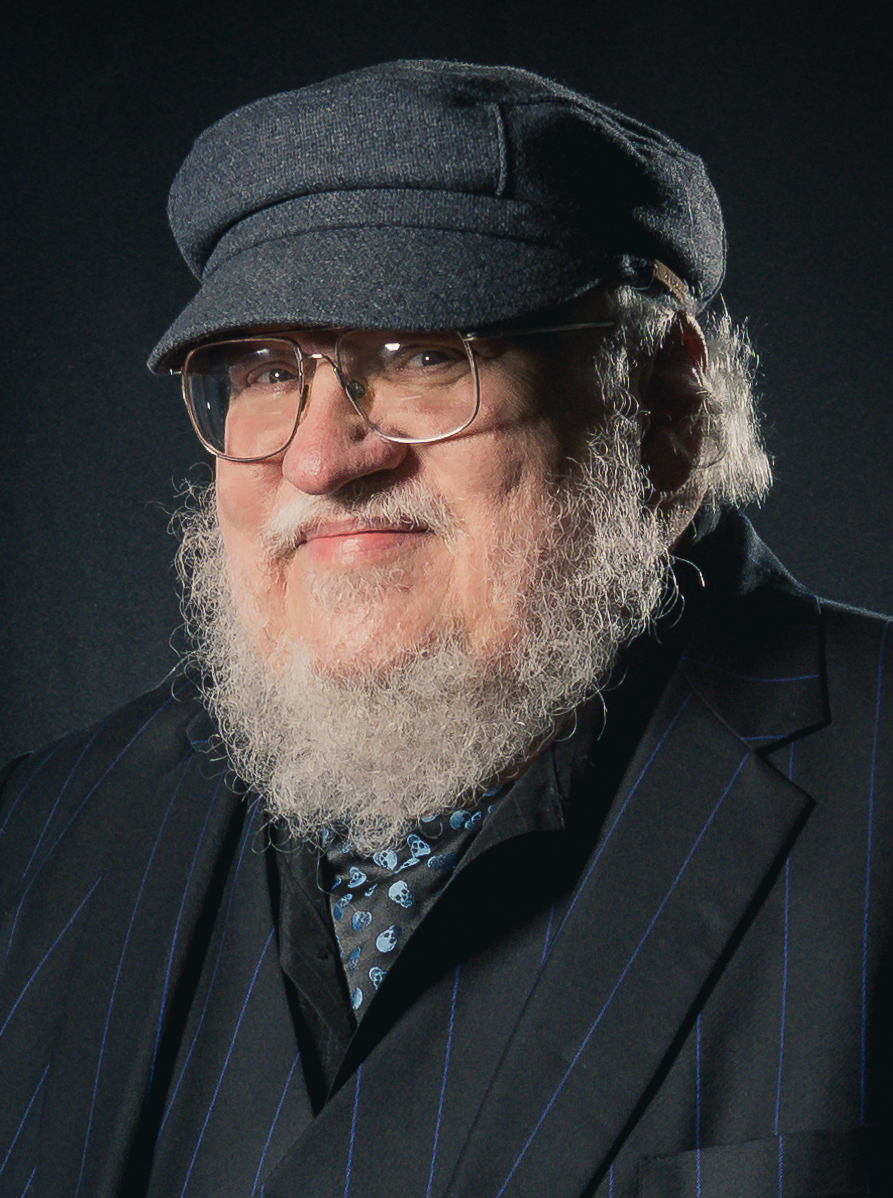
Show creators and executive producers Ryan Condal (left) and George R. R. Martin (right)

In 2015, with Game of Thrones still in production, HBO executives approached A Song of Ice and Fire writer George R. R. Martin regarding possible successors or spin-offs to the series. In November 2018, Martin stated that a "potential spin-off series would be solidly based on material in Fire & Blood." Game of Thrones creators David Benioff and D. B. Weiss stated they wanted to "move on" from the franchise and declined involvement in subsequent projects. By September 2019, a Game of Thrones prequel series from Martin and Ryan Condal that "tracks the beginning of the end for House Targaryen" was close to receiving a pilot order from HBO.

In October 2019, House of the Dragon was given a straight-to-series order. Condal and Miguel Sapochnik, who won an Emmy Award for directing the episode "Battle of the Bastards", were selected to serve as showrunners. In 2016, Condal pitched the idea of a series based on Martin's Tales of Dunk and Egg, however HBO initially passed on it. The series begins 172 years before the events of Game of Thrones during the reign of King Viserys I Targaryen, ultimately leading to the Targaryen civil war known as the Dance of the Dragons. The project is a reworking of the rejected spin-off concept from Game of Thrones writer Bryan Cogman, on which HBO officially passed.

Inspiration for the series came from English medieval history and the Anarchy, a war of succession after the death of Henry I of England between his nephew Stephen of Blois and only surviving child, Empress Matilda, who had fled to Normandy in the 12th century. In January 2020, Casey Bloys, HBO's president of programming, stated that writing had begun. Writers for the show include Condal and Sara Hess, who previously wrote for Deadwood and Orange Is the New Black. Martin was also involved in the pre-production, providing input on storylines and reviewed scripts and rough cuts.

On August 26, 2022, less than a week after its premiere, the series was renewed for a second season. On August 31, Miguel Sapochnik stepped down as director and co-showrunner for the second season, but remained an executive producer. Alan Taylor, who directed Game of Thrones episodes, joined in season two and serves as an executive producer and director. On his personal blog in December 2023, Martin stated the third and fourth seasons are being written.

In June 2024, ahead of the second-season premiere, the series was renewed for a third season, which also consists of eight episodes. After the second season finished airing in August 2024, Condal said the series is intended to end after the fourth season. In November 2025, the series was renewed for a fourth season, which is expected to be released in 2028. In January 2026, Condal confirmed that the fourth season would be the last season of House of the Dragon.

==== Changes from the novels ====
It was very important for Miguel and I to create a show that was not another bunch of white people on the screen. We wanted to find a way to put diversity in the show, but we didn't want to do it in a way that felt like it was an afterthought or, worse, tokenism.

— Ryan Condal, July 2022 interview with Entertainment Weekly

In the novels, members of House Velaryon are generally described as having "silver-gold hair, pale skin, and violet eyes", similar to the Targaryens. However, Condal and Sapochnik wanted to introduce more racial diversity with its casting. Game of Thrones was criticized for lacking a diverse cast and including cultural stereotypes. As a result, House Velaryon are portrayed as black in the television series. According to Condal, Martin, while writing the novels, considered making the Velaryons a house of black aristocrats who traveled to Westeros from the culturally diverse area of Valyria. Despite initial fan criticism of the ethnicity change, publications and commentators stated it helped distinguish between the large number of characters between the two families.

Fire & Blood is written in the style of a history book authored by an in-universe fictional historian studying the Targaryen dynasty and various civil conflicts. The novels of A Song of Ice and Fire, however, are more immersive, with each chapter written in a third-person limited perspective from the immediate point of view of a character. As a result, some accounts of events recorded in Fire & Blood are second-hand narrations that are potentially speculative or distorted, therefore making the narrator unreliable from the reader's perspective. In an effort to make the story more clear for viewers, the show writers decided to portray the book events in chronological order from a third-person perspective.

==== Rift between Condal and Martin ====
In September 2024, author George R. R. Martin published, then deleted, a blog post criticizing Ryan Condal and other showrunners over their past and planned changes to the source material regarding House of the Dragon. In March 2025, Condal discussed creative tensions with Martin, citing disagreements over the adaptation of material from Martin's Fire & Blood. In an interview with Entertainment Weekly, Condal described their past collaboration as "mutually fruitful" but noted that differences had developed regarding the show's narrative direction. Condal stated that he became aware of the post secondhand and expressed disappointment over the situation. He defended creative choices made in the series, including the exclusion of the character Maelor Targaryen from season 2, citing production limitations and the interpretive nature of Fire & Blood, which presents events as historical accounts rather than definitive canon. Condal acknowledged the difficulty of adapting a complex, expansive narrative within the constraints of television production and expressed hope for a future reconciliation with Martin.

After the deleted blog post, which Martin described in the THR interview as "80 percent [...] praise, but that’s not what people focused on", the relationship between Condal and Martin continued to deteriorate. Martin objected to Condal's vision for season three of House of the Dragon in a Zoom call, during which Martin allegedly said, "This is not my story any longer." After the Zoom call, HBO asked Martin to entirely step back from House of the Dragon. However, a few months later, Martin was brought back aboard production for season 3, and an HBO insider stated that they "figure[d] out a new way forward".

In January 2026, in an interview with The Hollywood Reporter, Martin described his relationship with Condal as "abysmal" and that changes from the source material Fire & Blood affected key plot points. Martin said:

I thought Ryan [Condal] and I were partners. And we were all through the first season. I would read early drafts of the scripts. I would give notes. He would change some things. It was working really well – I thought. Then we got into season two, and he basically stopped listening to me. I would give notes, and nothing would happen. Sometimes he would explain why he wasn't doing it. Other times, he would tell me, "Oh, OK, yeah, I'll think about that." It got worse and worse, and I began to get more and more annoyed. Finally, it got to a point where I was told by HBO that I should submit all my notes to them and they would give Ryan our combined notes.

Martin remains a co-creator and executive producer of House of the Dragon Season 3.

=== Casting ===
Casting for the first season began in July 2020. In October 2020, Paddy Considine was cast as Viserys I Targaryen. By December, Olivia Cooke, Matt Smith, and Emma D'Arcy were cast as Alicent Hightower, Daemon Targaryen, and Rhaenyra Targaryen, respectively. In February 2021, Rhys Ifans, Steve Toussaint, Eve Best, and Sonoya Mizuno were added to the main cast. By April, Fabien Frankel joined the cast as Criston Cole. In July, Emily Carey and Milly Alcock were added to the cast as younger counterparts of Alicent Hightower and Rhaenyra Targaryen, respectively.

In April 2023, Gayle Rankin, Simon Russell Beale, Freddie Fox, and Abubakar Salim were announced to have joined the cast for the second season. In December, Tom Taylor, Clinton Liberty, Jamie Kenna, Kieran Bew, Tom Bennett, and Vincent Regan joined the cast.

In January 2025, James Norton was announced to have joined the cast for the third season. In March, Tommy Flanagan and Dan Fogler joined the cast. In April, Tom Cullen, Joplin Sibtain, and Barry Sloane joined the cast. In July, Annie Shapero joined the cast. Benjamin Evan Ainsworth also joined the cast for the third season, but his involvement was not confirmed until July 2026 due to a plot twist surrounding his character's identity.

=== Filming ===
Principal photography on the ten-episode first season of the series began in April 2021. The series was filmed primarily in the United Kingdom. The Spanish publication Hoy reported that House of the Dragon would be filmed in the Province of Cáceres in western Spain between October 11–21, 2021. The provincial capital of Cáceres along with the medieval town of Trujillo were used in scenes for King's Landing. From October 26–31, the series was filmed in Portugal at the Castle of Monsanto. The majority of season 1 was shot using Arri Alexa cameras; specifically Alexa 65s for the main camera and the Alexa Mini LFs as additional cameras.

Locations in Cornwall, England included St Michael's Mount, Holywell Beach and Kynance Cove. Other locations included Castleton, Derbyshire, in areas such as Cave Dale, Eldon Hill Quarry and the Market Place. Some scenes were shot in Aldershot, Hampshire. In February 2022, HBO confirmed that the first season of House of the Dragon had wrapped production. Visual effects for the series were produced in part by Pixomondo, who worked on Game of Thrones and received an Emmy Award for Outstanding Visual Effects. In October 2022, it was reported that the OSVP stage at Leavesden Studios, used in the series, was shutting down.

The second season began filming on April 11, 2023, at Warner Bros. Studios, Leavesden in Watford, England, and moved to Cáceres, Spain on May 18, 2023. The series continued filming throughout the 2023 SAG-AFTRA strike. Despite the show originating in the United States, the largely British cast works under local rules governed by the sister union Equity. Filming wrapped by September 29, 2023.

Filming for the third season began on March 21, 2025, at Leavesden Studios, Watford and wrapped by that October.

=== Music ===
It was announced in February 2021 that Ramin Djawadi would compose the score for the series. Djawadi had previously composed the music for Game of Thrones, which garnered him three Grammy Awards nominations and two Emmy Awards wins. Djawadi and the showrunners opted to retain the Game of Thrones theme music for House of the Dragon. The track debuted in the opening credits of the second episode.

In an interview with The A.V. Club, Djawadi stated that the original theme song was used to "tie the shows together". For the first season's soundtrack, Djawadi, along with Condal and Sapochnik, watched each episode and made notes on when the music should occur and what mood the music should set. Character motifs from Game of Thrones are also featured in House of the Dragon, including the Dragon theme "Dracarys".

=== Language ===
Game of Thrones conlanger David J. Peterson returned to continue his work on the constructed language High Valyrian. Peterson stated that, unlike Game of Thrones, House of the Dragon features scene-long dialogue in High Valyrian. In the series, High Valyrian is spoken by both Targaryens and Velaryons, requiring cast members to learn the language. Emma D'Arcy reportedly enjoyed learning it, while Matt Smith initially dreaded it and found it daunting.

=== Budget ===
The production budget of the first season of House of the Dragon was nearly $200 million, which equates to an average of just below $20 million per episode. In comparison, Game of Thrones cost around $100 million per season, beginning with nearly $6 million per episode from seasons one to five, around $10 million for every episode in seasons six and seven, and up to $15 million each episode in its eighth and final season, earning $285 million in profits per season over its eight seasons. According to Deadline Hollywood, the marketing budget was over $100 million, comparable to the budget for a blockbuster theatrical film.

== Release ==
House of the Dragon premiered on August 21, 2022. It is HBO's first new series to stream in 4K, Dolby Vision HDR and Dolby Atmos on its sister streaming platform HBO Max. The second season premiered on June 16, 2024. The third season premiered on June 21, 2026.

=== International broadcast ===
In New Zealand, the series is distributed by Sky's SoHo TV channel and Neon streaming service. In the Philippines, SKY broadcasts the show via its main cable television services and other digital streaming platforms. In India, JioHotstar distributes the show. In the UK, Ireland, Italy, Germany, Austria and Switzerland, the series airs on Sky Atlantic and its accompanying streaming service Now. In Canada, House of the Dragon is available on Bell Media's Crave streaming service and its HBO linear channel. In Australia, the series is available for streaming on Binge and Foxtel.

=== Home media ===
The first season was released on 4K UHD Blu-ray, including a SteelBook special edition, standard Blu-ray, and DVD in December 2022, and contains over an hour of behind-the-scenes features. The second season was released on all the same physical media formats in November 2024.

== Reception ==
=== Critical response ===
Critical response of House of the Dragon
Season	Rotten Tomatoes	Metacritic
1	90% (873 reviews)	69 (43 reviews)
2	84% (283 reviews)	73 (40 reviews)
3	91% (163 reviews)	75 (27 reviews)

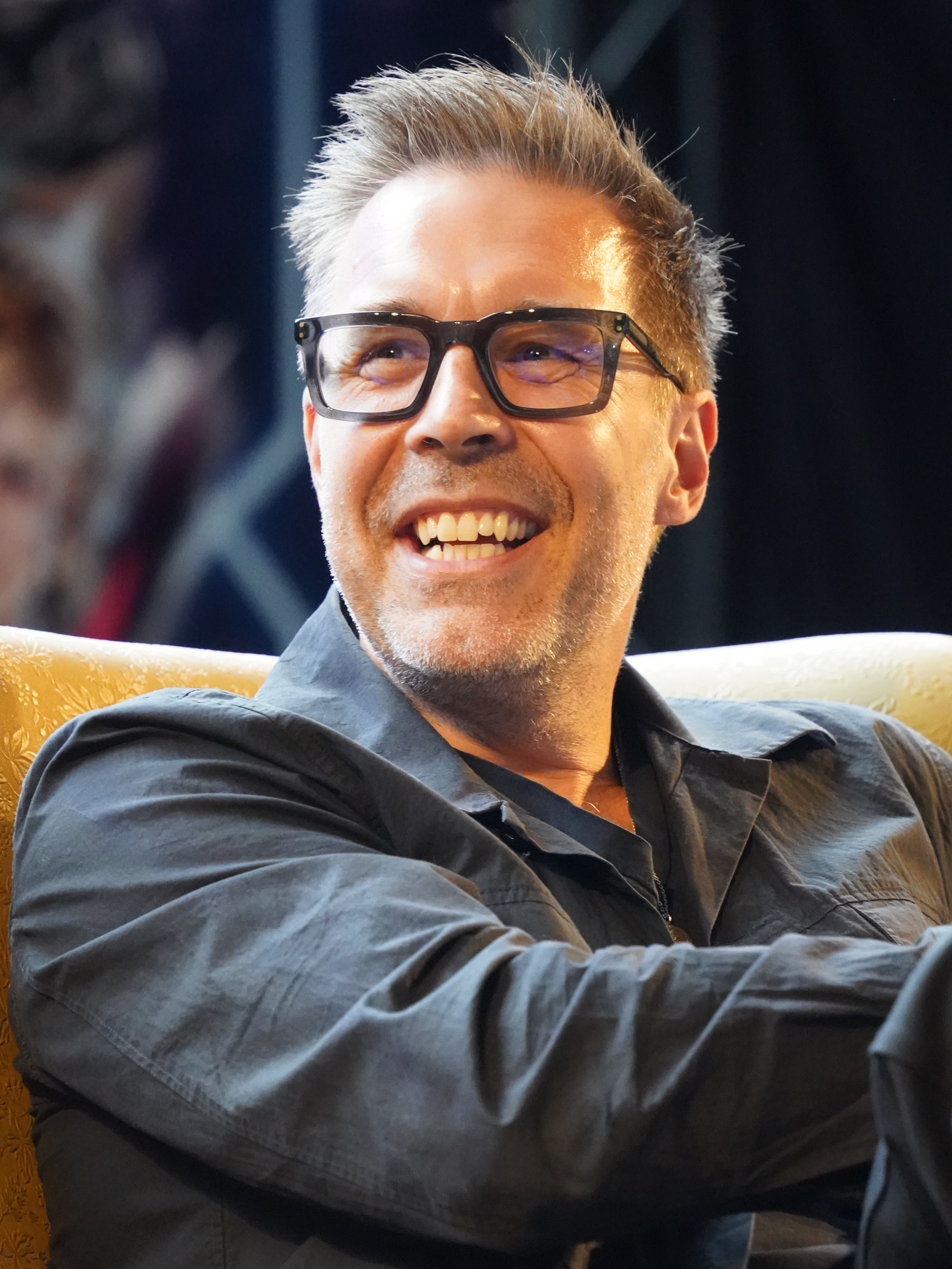
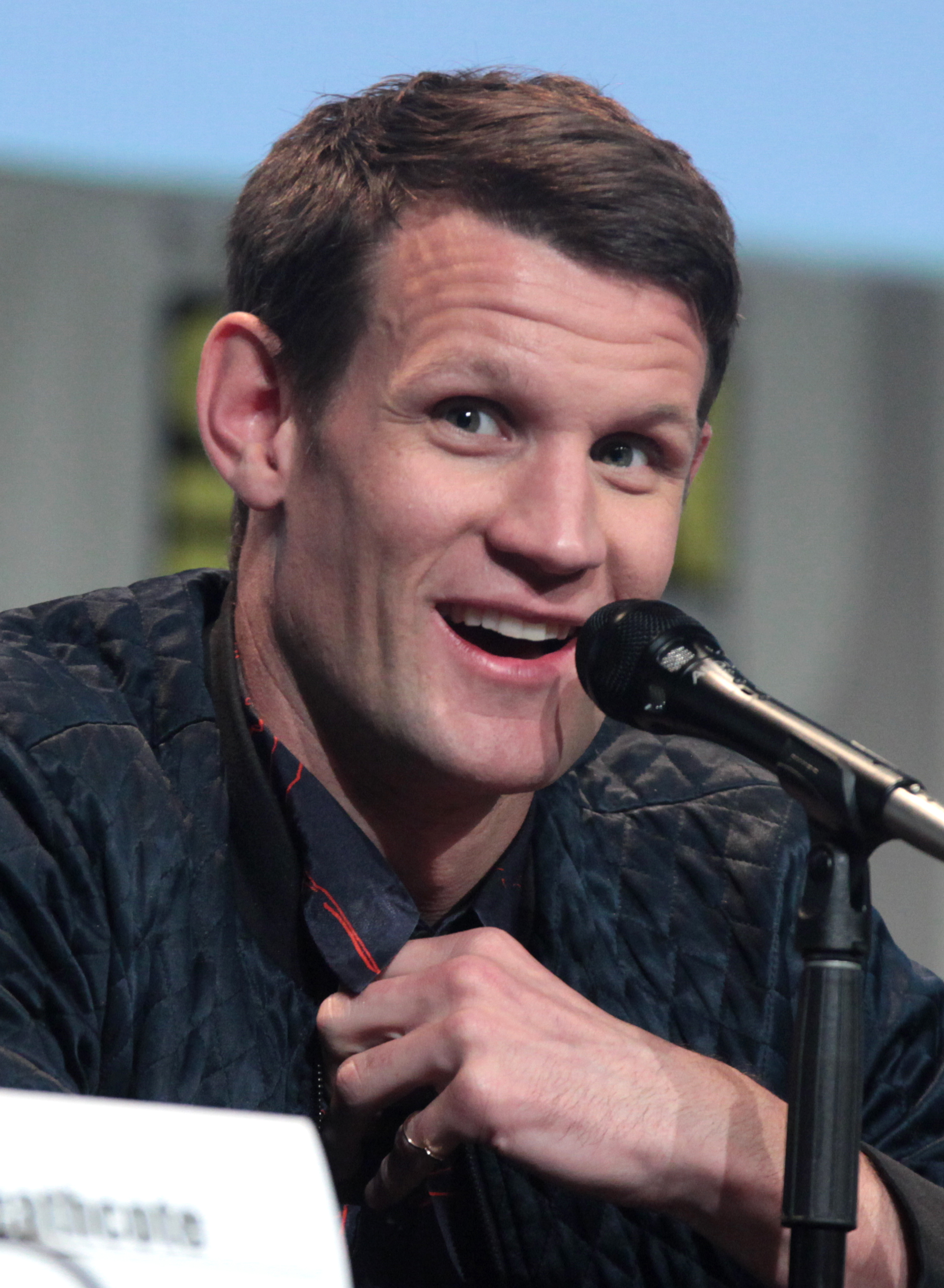
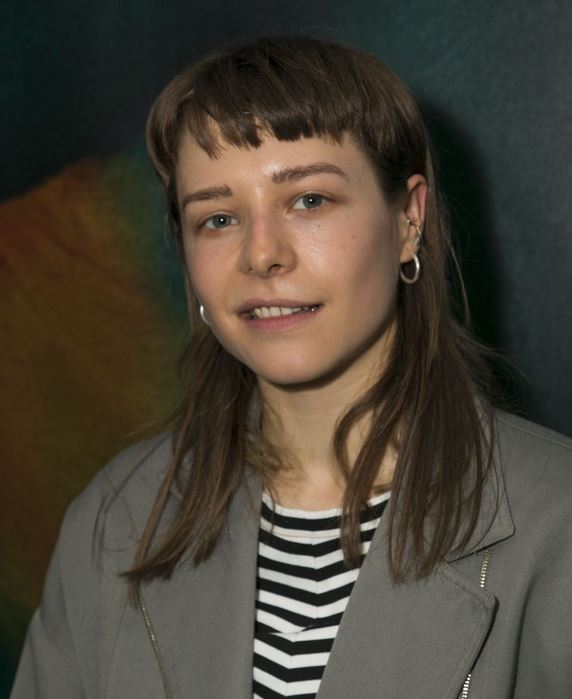
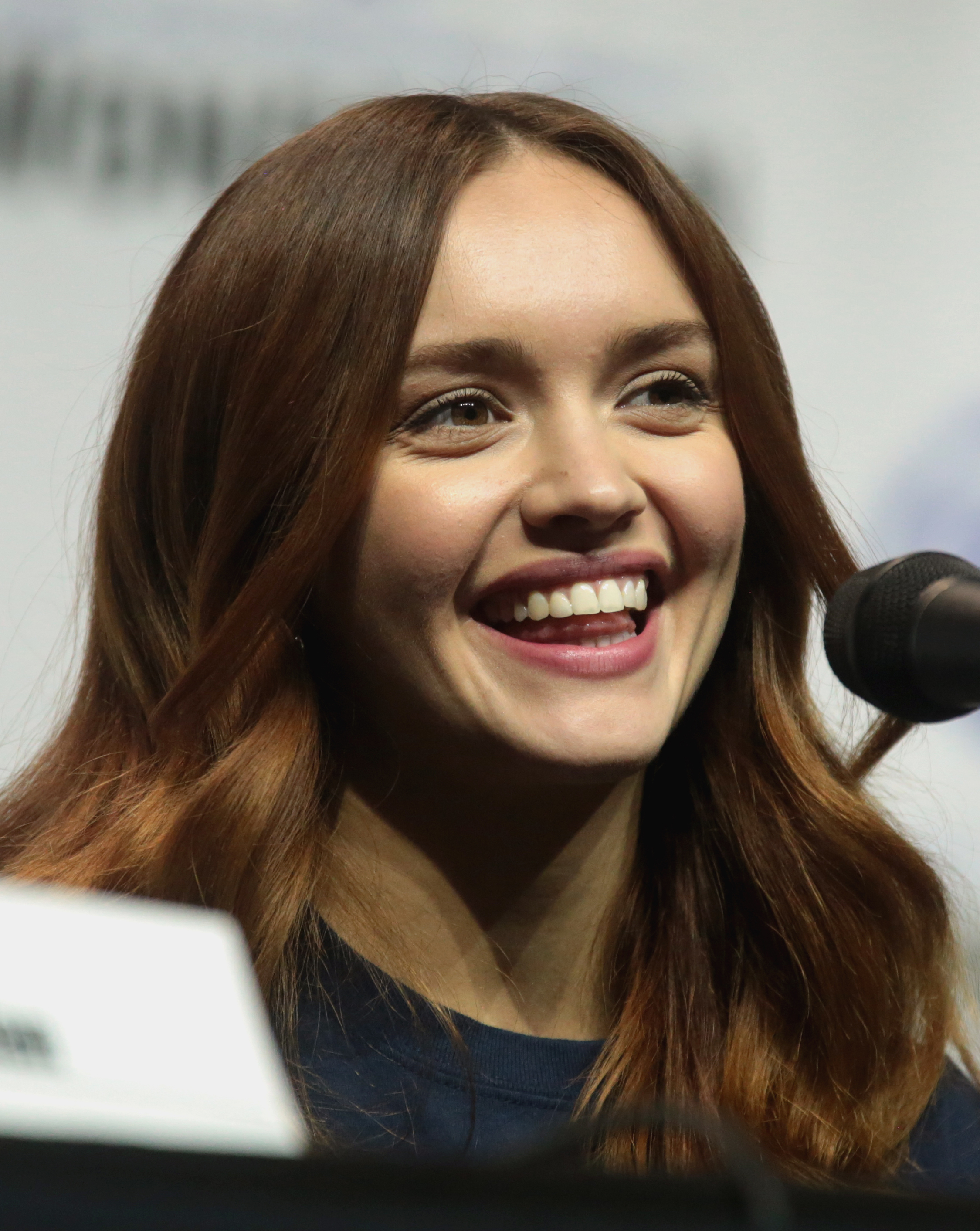
The performances of Paddy Considine, Matt Smith, Emma D'Arcy and Olivia Cooke received critical acclaim.

On the review aggregation website Rotten Tomatoes, the first season holds an approval rating of 90% based on 873 reviews, with an average rating of 7.85/10. The website's critical consensus reads, "Covering an era of tenuous peace with ferocious – albeit abbreviated – focus, House of the Dragon is an impressive prequel that exemplifies the court intrigue that distinguished its predecessor." On Metacritic, which uses a weighted average, the first season received a score of 69 out of 100 based on 43 critic reviews, indicating "generally favorable reviews".

On Rotten Tomatoes, the second season holds an approval rating of 84% based on 283 reviews, with an average rating of 7.55/10. The website's critical consensus reads, "Approaching its dynastic cataclysm with a deliberate stride rather than a charging gallop, House of the Dragon carefully sets up its emotional stakes to make the fiery spectacle all the more scorching." On Metacritic, the second season received a score of 73 out of 100 based on 40 critic reviews, indicating "generally favorable reviews".

On Rotten Tomatoes, the third season holds an approval rating of 91% based on 163 reviews, with an average rating of 7.6/10. The website's critical consensus reads, "The fate of Westeros comes to a head in a reinvigorated and riveting third season of House of the Dragon, complete with wicked new characters and more thrilling battles, crafting a punchy prequel that matches the expectations of its predecessor." On Metacritic, the third season received a score of 75 out of 100 based on 27 critic reviews, indicating "generally favorable" reviews.

=== Viewership ===
The day after the series premiere, HBO said the episode had been viewed by an estimated 9.99 million viewers in the U.S. on its first night of availability – including linear viewers and streams on HBO Max – which it said was the largest single-day viewership for a series debut in the service's history, dethroning Euphoria. After one week of availability, the viewership rose to nearly 25 million in the U.S. across all platforms. Nielsen estimated that the episode was watched by 10.6 million viewers on HBO Max in the first four days, with the number increasing to 14.5 million when including the viewership on the main HBO channel. (Note: Nielsen measures linear viewership in number of viewers while streaming shows are measured in number of minutes.)

Season 2 had a debut of 7.8 million viewers across linear and streaming on its Sunday night premiere, which was a 22% viewership decline from the previous season which had 10 million. In Latin America, viewership was up 30% from season 1. According to Samba TV, viewership for its initial airing of the premiere was watched by 1.3 million U.S. households, compared to 2.6 million for season 1. The series garnered its highest streaming viewership for a particular week during the week of June 17–23, 2024, according to Nielsen, garnering a viewership of 1.23 billion minutes.

The season 3 premiere saw 21.5 million viewers across both linear and streaming platforms worldwide. By the time the finale aired, the third season had garnered a global audience of approximately 33 million viewers per episode.

=== Comparisons with The Lord of the Rings: The Rings of Power ===
Critics, fans, and publications have drawn comparisons between House of the Dragon and fantasy series The Lord of the Rings: The Rings of Power on Amazon Prime Video. The Rings of Power is a prequel series set thousands of years before the events of J. R. R. Tolkien's The Hobbit and The Lord of the Rings, while House of the Dragon is a prequel series set hundreds of years before Game of Thrones. The similar fantasy genre, close release dates, and extensive fan bases were cited in articles comparing the two series. Commentators and fans alike have described these comparisons as the "biggest battle in TV history".

More negative criticism from the two fan bases also included the character diversity, with some publications describing some of the criticism as racist. Martin stated that although he hopes both shows are successful, he wants to see House of the Dragon "succeed more." Lindsey Weber, an executive producer for The Rings of Power, stated that the head-to-head conflict between the two shows are "totally manufactured by the media for headlines". Show co-creator J. D. Payne said the only competition he sees is with "themselves"; however, he wishes well for "anyone else working on storytelling".

The budget for The Rings of Power is almost $450 million more than House of the Dragon. Both series fared successfully in the ratings. According to Nielsen and first-party data, The Rings of Power's first two episodes had more than 1.25 billion streaming minutes after three days of availability. In comparison, a few hours after the episode two premiere of House of the Dragon, the show had reached more than 1.06 billion streaming minutes. (Note: Linear viewership numbers for House of the Dragon are not included in the streaming viewership numbers.) Following the season finale for House of the Dragon, weekly streaming viewership passed 1 billion viewing minutes for the first time.

According to Nielsen data, The Rings of Power has a higher percentage of older viewers, with more than 70% of viewers being over the age of 35. In any given week, The Rings of Power tended to have more streams than House of the Dragon given that the viewership of House of the Dragon was split between those watching online and those watching on HBO channel while that of The Rings of Power was online only. Following both series debuts, streaming viewership for The Rings of Power decreased over the first season, while House of the Dragon viewership increased.

The viewership of individual episodes of House of the Dragon tended to increase over a number of weeks after the episodes became available while that of The Rings of Power dropped sharply after the first two weeks. Despite the age gap in viewership, commentators have stated one of the reasons both shows did well was the consistent release schedule that helped create social-media buzz. Both shows have highlighted the "streaming wars" between Amazon and HBO as well as in the wider entertainment industry.

=== Accolades ===
House of the Dragon received nine Primetime Emmy Awards nominations in 2023, including Outstanding Drama Series, winning one for Outstanding Fantasy/Sci-Fi Costumes. The series won the Golden Globe Award Best Television Series – Drama in 2023, while Emma D'Arcy earned two Best Actress in a Television Series – Drama nominations in 2023 and 2025. Other nominations include three Critics' Choice Awards, and two Screen Actors Guild Awards.

== See also ==
- The novella The Princess and the Queen (2013) and its prequel The Rogue Prince (2014), both by George R. R. Martin, later incorporated into the "Dance of the Dragons" plotline in Fire & Blood.
