= Kieran Bew =

English actor (born 1980)

- Born: Kieran John Bew; 18 August 1980 (age 46); Hartlepool, England
- Education: London Academy of Music and Dramatic Art (BA)
- Years active: 2001–present
- Website: Markham, Froggatt & Irwin

Kieran John Bew (born 18 August 1980) is an English actor, known for portraying Hugh Hammer in House of the Dragon, 'Big' Bill O’Hara in Warrior, Alfonso, Duke of Calabria in Da Vinci's Demons, Hans Christian Andersen: My Life as a Fairytale, and Gary Parr in Jimmy McGovern's BAFTA Award-winning The Street alongside Matt Smith.

He has worked extensively in British theatre and television since graduating from LAMDA in 2001.

== Early life ==
Bew was born in Hartlepool, County Durham, England. He attended English Martyrs School and Sixth Form College. He trained at the London Academy of Music and Dramatic Art. His brother Duncan is a surgeon at King's College Hospital.

As a young fencer Bew won the under-16 and under-17 British épée titles, competed throughout Europe, and placed 21st at the Cadet World Championships in 1996. He also spent time in his childhood as a competitive swimmer and basketball player. He currently competes domestically for Haverstock fencing club.

== Career ==
In 1999 Bew worked as fight choreographer and captain for Mark Rylance's productions of Hamlet and Two Noble Kinsmen at Shakespeare's Globe Theatre in London.

On television Bew appeared in Hustle and Spooks for BBC and Crusoe for NBC. He has also appeared in two Hallmark television films, Brush with Fate, alongside Ellen Burstyn and Kelly Macdonald, and Hans Christian Andersen, with Hugh Bonneville and James Fox.

In 2004, he played a football hooligan called Ike in the popular film Green Street alongside Elijah Wood and Charlie Hunnam. In 2006, he played Gary Parr in Jimmy McGovern's The Street, alongside Matt Smith and Gina McKee. In 2008, he played the lead guitarist in the independent film 1234. In 2009, he appeared in the BBC Three drama Personal Affairs, playing Avi Gellman. In 2013 and 2014, he appeared as Detective Inspector Jack Burns in the BBC's daytime drama WPC 56. In May 2017, he guest starred in series 10 of BBC1 series Doctor Who as Ivan in the 5th episode of the run "Oxygen".

In 2017, Kieran played the part of Ian in ITV mini series "Liar". Since 2019 Bew has played a major role in the HBO Max series "Warrior" as an Irish policeman in the throes of conflict in the early days of San Francisco's Chinatown.

== Stage work ==
Bew's stage work includes appearances in the following plays:

- as Exton and Fitzwater in Richard II, directed by Trevor Nunn, at the Old Vic Theatre, 2005.
- as Yakunin in The House of Special Purpose by Heidi Thomas, directed by Howard Davies, at the Minerva Theatre Chichester, 2009.
- as Richard in Moscow Live by Serge Cartwright, directed by Jonathan Humphreys, at the HighTide Festival, 2010.
- as The Men in The Knot of the Heart by David Eldridge, directed by Michael Attenborough, at the Almeida Theatre, 2011.
- as Kent in Reasons to Be Pretty by Neil LaBute, directed by Michael Attenborough, at the Almeida Theatre, 2011–12.
- as John in After Miss Julie by Patrick Marber, directed by Natalie Abrahami, at the Young Vic Theatre, 2012.
- as Edmund in King Lear, directed by Michael Attenborough, at the Almeida Theatre, 2012.
- as Laurent in Thérèse Raquin by Émile Zola, adapted by Helen Edmundson, directed by Jonathan Munby, at the Theatre Royal Bath, 2014.

== Narration ==
- Engineering The Impossible: Rome, National Geographic Channel and Channel 5, 2011
- Engineering The Impossible: Egypt, National Geographic Channel and Channel 5, 2011
- Rome Unwrapped (series) National Geographic Channel and Channel 5, 2011
- Strictly Baby Disco, Channel 4, 2011
- 24/7 Pet Hospital BBC1, 2023

== Filmography ==
=== Television ===
Year	Show	Role	Notes
2002	Bedtime	PC Smith	Series 2; episodes 2, 4 & 5
2003	Brush with Fate	Adrian Kuypers	Hallmark Hall of Fame
2003	Manchild	David Hynes	Series 2; episode 6
2003	Spooks	Bryant	1 Episode: Strike Force
2003	Where the Heart Is	Rob Deyton	1 Episode: Archangel
2003	Hans Christian Andersen: My Life as a Fairytale	Hans Christian Andersen	Hallmark Entertainment
2004	Silent Witness	Stephen Wiltshire	2 Episodes: Body 21 (Part One) & Body 21 (Part Two)
2005	M.I.T.: Murder Investigation Team	Gareth Frears	Series 2; episode 2
2005	Hustle	Neil Davis	1 Episode: Missions
2005–2006	The Bill	Benjamin Meadows	Recurring; 6 episodes
2007	Midsomer Murders	Danny Twyman	1 Episode: They Seek Him Here
2007	The Whistleblowers	Luke Doughty	1 Episode: Ghosts
2007	The Street	Gary Parr	2 Episodes: Demolition & Taxi
2008	King Lear	Soldier	RSC performance recorded for television
2008–2009	Crusoe	Nathan West	Recurring; 6 episodes
2009	Personal Affairs	Avi Gellman	5 part series
2011	Silent Witness	Ltn. Stephen Lockford	2 Episodes: First Casualty (Part One) & First Casualty (Part Two)
2011	Waking the Dead	Young Murray Stuart	2 Episodes: Solidarity (Part One) & Solidarity (Part Two)
2011	Inspector George Gently	David Nugent	1 Episode: Gently Upside Down
2011	Young James Herriot	Desmond Murray	Series 1; Episode 2
2012	Whitechapel	Mace Driffield	Series 3; Episode 5
2012	The Bletchley Circle	Clerk on Train	Series 1; episodes 2 & 3
2012	Dark Matters: Twisted But True	Mesmer	1 Episode: Agent Orange, Ben Franklin: Freud Slayer, Price of Beauty
2012	Dark Matters: Twisted But True	Thomas Midgley Jr.	1 Episode: Unabomber, Salvation by Starvation, Get the Lead Out
2013–2014	WPC 56	DI Jack Burns	6 episodes
2014–2015	Da Vinci's Demons	Duke Alphonso of Calabria	8 Episodes
2016	Beowulf: Return to the Shieldlands	Beowulf	12 part series
2017	Doctor Who	Ivan	1 episode: Oxygen
2017	Cold Feet	Gareth	Series 7; episodes 6 & 7
2017	Rellik	DI Mike Sutherland	6 part series
2017–2020	Liar	Ian Davies	5 episodes
2019–2023	Warrior	Bill O'Hara	Main role
2022	Rules of the Game	Gareth Jenkins	4 part series
2024–present	House of the Dragon	Hugh Hammer	Main role; 12 episodes
2025	Outlander	Charles Cunningham	Season 8

=== Film ===
Year	Title	Role	Notes
2001	Shotgun Wedding	Stag	Short film
2004	Alien vs. Predator	Klaus	
2005	Green Street	Ike	
2007	Rise of the Footsoldier	Ricky	Credited as "Kieren Bew"
2008	Slapper		Short film
2009	1234	Billy Nixon	
2009	The Wedding Dress	Groom	Short film
2013	The Busker and the Coin	Him	Short film
2013	Et in Motorcadia Ego	Harbinger	Short film
2013	Miriam	Male Neighbour	Short film
2014	Five Minutes	Dad	Short film
2015	At First Sight	Jamie	Short film
2017	Twisted	Toby Nordlund	Short film
2018	Isabella	Hayden	Short film
2021	Absent Now the Dead	Thersites	Voice role
2022	Typist Artist Pirate King	Gabe Patier	

=== Video game ===
Year	Game	Role	Notes
2013	Ryse: Son of Rome	Additional voices	
2014	Dragon Age: Inquisition	Additional voices	
2017	Mass Effect: Andromeda	Additional voices	
2017	Total War: Warhammer II	Prince Imrik	
2019	Anthem	Additional voices	
