= Sonoya Mizuno =

British actress (born 1986)

- Born: 1 July 1986 (age 40); Tokyo, Japan
- Citizenship: United Kingdom
- Education: Royal Ballet School
- Occupation: Actress
- Years active: 2012–present

Sonoya Mizuno (born 1 July 1986) is a British actress. She is known for her collaborations with Alex Garland—most notably, portraying Kyoko in the film Ex Machina (2014) and starring in the FX miniseries Devs (2020)—as well as for her roles in the Netflix series Maniac (2018), the HBO series House of the Dragon (2022–present) and the film Crazy Rich Asians (2018).

== Early life ==
Sonoya Mizuno was born in Tokyo on 1 July 1986, the daughter of an British-Argentine mother and Japanese father. The family later moved to England, where she grew up in Somerset. She graduated from the Royal Ballet School before dancing with several ballet companies, including Semperoper Ballet in Dresden, Ballet Ireland, New English Ballet Theatre and Scottish Ballet.

== Career ==
Mizuno took up professional modelling at age 20 with Profile Models in London. She has modelled for Chanel, Alexander McQueen, Saint Laurent and Louis Vuitton. In 2014, she appeared in Arthur Pita's work of dance theatre The World's Greatest Show at Greenwich Dance and the Royal Opera House.

While modeling, she took acting classes and made her film debut in 2014, in Alex Garland's science-fiction thriller Ex Machina, and in 2016 appeared in the dance film High Strung, directed by Michael Damian. Mizuno performed in the Dom & Nic video for The Chemical Brothers' "Wide Open", featuring Beck, where she played a dancer gradually transformed into a 3-D lattice. Later that year she appeared in the music video for Frank Ocean's song "Nikes". Also in 2016, she appeared in La La Land as one of the three roommates of Mia, played by Emma Stone.

In 2017, Mizuno appeared in a small role as the debutante in Disney's live-action adaptation of Beauty and the Beast, and in 2018, she acted in the Warner Bros. film Crazy Rich Asians.

She has appeared in television/streaming roles including Cary Joji Fukunaga's Maniac on Netflix. In 2018, she took the lead role of Lily Chan in Garland's miniseries for FX, Devs. In 2024, she appeared in the war drama Civil War. She has worked with Garland five times: as the lead of Devs, as a supporting character in Ex Machina and Civil War, and as a featured extra in Annihilation and Men.

Mizuno appeared on stage in Gareth Farr’s A Child of Science, which ran at the Bristol Old Vic from June to July 2024.

== Filmography ==
=== Film ===
Year	Title	Role(s)	Director(s)	Notes
2012	Venus in Eros	Forest Guard	Takako Imai	
2014	Ex Machina	Kyoko	Alex Garland	
2016	High Strung	Jazzy	Michael Damian	
2016	Alleycats	Suzie	Ian Bonhôte	
2016	La La Land	Caitlin	Damien Chazelle	
2017	Beauty and the Beast	Debutante	Bill Condon	
2018	Annihilation	Katie / Humanoid	Alex Garland	
2018	All About Nina	Ganja	Eva Vives	
2018	The Domestics	Betsy	Mike P. Nelson	
2018	Crazy Rich Asians	Araminta Lee	Jon M. Chu	
2019	Ambition	Sarah	Robert Shaye	
2022	Am I OK?	Jane	Tig Notaro & Stephanie Allynne	
2022	Men	Police Operator	Alex Garland	Voice
2023	Shortcomings	Meredith	Randall Park	
2024	Civil War	Anya	Alex Garland	
2025	Deep Cover	Shosh	Tom Kingsley	
2025	Eternal Return	TBA	Yaniv Raz	
2028	Elden Ring †	TBA	Alex Garland	Post-production
TBA	Stages †	—N/a	Herself	Director and writer; pre-production

=== Television ===
Year	Title	Role	Notes
2018	Maniac	Dr. Azumi Fujita	Miniseries
2020	Devs	Lily Chan	Lead role; miniseries
2022–present	House of the Dragon	Mysaria	Main role; 21 episodes
2024	Terminator Zero	Eiko	Voice role
2025	Too Much	Peregrine	Episode: "One Wedding and a Sex Pest"
2025	Star Wars: Visions	Nakime	Voice role; episode: "The Bird of Paradise"

=== Music videos ===
Year	Title	Performer(s)	Ref.
2010	"Coma Cat"	Tensnake	
2016	"Wide Open"	The Chemical Brothers featuring Beck	
2016	"Nikes"	Frank Ocean	
2023	"God Walked Down"	The Allergies	
