= Tumbleton =

- House of the Dragon episode
- Ormund Hightower speaking to his nephew Daeron Targaryen
- Episode no.: Season 3 Episode 4
- Directed by: Clare Kilner
- Written by: David Hancock
- Cinematography by: Alejandro Martínez
- Editing by: Brenna Rangott
- Original air date: July 12, 2026
- Running time: 62 minutes

Episode chronology
← Previous "Rhaenyra Triumphant"	Next → "Unbowed and Unbent"
- House of the Dragon season 3

"Tumbleton" is the fourth episode of the third season of the fantasy drama television series House of the Dragon. A prequel to Game of Thrones, the series depicts the events leading up to the decline of House Targaryen during a devastating war of succession for the Iron Throne of Westeros known as the "Dance of the Dragons". The episode was written by executive producer David Hancock and directed by Clare Kilner. It first aired on HBO and HBO Max on July 12, 2026.

In the episode, Ormund begins his occupation of Tumbleton while Rhaenyra struggles with how to respond. Aegon and Larys reach Rook's Rest, Criston and Gwayne arrive at Harrenhal, and Daemon makes a discovery that challenges his morals.

The episode received critical acclaim, with praise for writing and plot momentum, and the performances, particularly those of James Norton, Benjamin Evan Ainsworth, Matt Smith, Phoebe Campbell, Tom Glynn-Carney, and Fabien Frankel.

== Plot ==
In the Crownlands, Aegon and Larys come across the body of Sunfyre, who Aegon swears is still alive, before the pair reach Rook's Rest. Aegon is forced to clean latrines in return for food and shelter. When Aegon resists, the rogue soldier running the castle's refugee camp makes him kiss his boots, to Aegon's humiliation.

In the Riverlands, Criston and Gwayne reach Harrenhal, but cannot find Aemond. Alys tells them that Aemond left some time ago, and that she is now the castle's steward. Gwayne suggests they join his cousin Ormund at Tumbleton, but Criston, consumed by nihilism, instead suggests they wage guerrilla warfare against the Tully army, despite the risks.

In King's Landing, Rhaenyra assembles a new Small Council and allows Orwyle to remain as Grand Maester. She also permits Alyn to sit in as Hand of the Queen for Corlys, who left the city to fight the remaining Triarchy invaders. Orwyle cautions Rhaenyra against removing the High Septon, warning that this would incite the Faith to rebel against her. Mysaria suggests installing Torrhen as Master of Coin so he can be scapegoated for the city's financial situation. After Ulf requests favors for his drinking friends that are denied, he informs Rhaenyra that the smallfolk had begun spreading rumors of her children's illegitimacy. Rhaenyra orders the City Watch to search for the culprits and sends Hugh and Ulf to observe Tumbleton. Alicent discovers that Helaena is pregnant.

Daemon visits Jeyne in the Vale, who revels in making him uncomfortable, (Note: Jeyne detests Daemon because of her suspicion that he murdered his first wife, Rhea Royce, a vassal house to House Arryn, and banished him from the Vale after her death. These events are depicted in "We Light the Way".) but ultimately agrees to give coin to Rhaenyra's cause. When Daemon leaves, Caraxes disobeys him and flies to a nearby cave, where he discovers Rhaena and realizes she is Sheepstealer's rider. Rhaena argues that she cannot face Rhaenyra, and must live in exile as penance for inadvertently causing Jace's death. Though conflicted about lying to Rhaenyra for Rhaena's protection, Daemon kills a local shepherd and presents his charred head to Rhaenyra. While she becomes frustrated at not getting justice for Jace herself, Mysaria becomes suspicious of Daemon's actions.

In Tumbleton, Ormund continues to occupy the town despite protests from the local nobility. A soldier assaults Kat, Hugh's wife, but her brother defends her, and the soldier is gelded as punishment. Ormund becomes enraged when he receives a letter from Gwayne stating that Aemond is not coming. (Note: In "Salt and Sea, Fire and Blood", Alicent sent Ormund a forged letter from Aemond declaring an intent to aid Ormund with Vhagar.) He chastises Daeron for showing affection towards his dragon Tessarion and forces him to kill Kat's brother, whom Tessarion roasts and eats. Ormund states he shall depose Rhaenyra and install Daeron on the Iron Throne.

== Production ==
=== Writing ===
"Tumbleton" was written by David Hancock, and directed by Clare Kilner, who directed the previous two episodes of the season "Queen's Landing" and "Rhaenyra Triumphant". The episode marks Hancock's third writing credit and Kilner's eighth directing credit.

Discussing Ormund, James Norton described him as "theatrical" and stated, "Ormund has become this slightly larger-than-life, unpredictable, many facets, many faces. His power, as well, is that he plays with that. Sometimes he loses his temper, and the faces, the different personalities that come out, are just pure rage. When he loses control, he becomes this monster, this kind of Jekyll and Hyde. But A lot of it is within his control." Of Daeron's relationship with Ormund, Benjamin Evan Ainsworth explained, "he's been his father figure for most of his life. With that comes this, I guess, longing for acceptance and appreciation. With the chaos and the unpredictable elements, it's like seeing through that theatricality and trying to know what's at the heart of these decisions he makes in order for his own survival, but also to see the bigger picture." He further called their relationship "twisted" and that the tension and stakes will rise in subsequent episodes as the occupation of Tumbleton continues. Norton added, "what was really important, I think, to both of us was—to offset the theatricality—make sure that this relationship was very real and authentic" and stated that he felt Daeron was "he most important person in his life. There is affection, there's love there, however warped that is." He further described Ormund's faith as something that has "tipped into a kind of fanaticism" and that "there's a level of superiority which he ascribes to the Hightowers, which is verging on—it's not just dubious, it's fascist" and stated, "there was a version of Ormund who would've been camp, ludicrous, really fun and delicious. Then it was these other parts of him, particularly the relationship with Daeron and also this other more sinister part of him, which is almost like the eugenics side of him where he fervently believes that his kin are entitled to the throne because they are just superior." Of Daeron's identity in relation to this, Ainsworth expressed, "there's this internal grappling or tension between, I guess, morality, who he is as an individual, and what his identity is. He's somewhere between Hightower and Targaryen. Around Ormund, he's certainly Hightower. But as the season progresses, being Targaryen becomes more and more valuable to Ormund, to himself, and to the prospect of becoming king and within this war, which he has no control over."

Emma D'Arcy felt that the revelation of Ormund's deception in the previous episodes "marks the beginning of paranoia for Rhaenyra" and described him as an "unknowable force" and a "bogeyman in Rhaenyra's consciousness" because she doesn't understand his intentions, and teased that this paranoia would have "greater repercussions" as the season continues. Showrunner Ryan Condal described Aegon's storyline as a "real low point" emotionally as he comes to terms with Sunfyre's death, and then the subsequent experiences he and Larys have at Rook's Rest, with Tom Glynn-Carney echoing that it feels like a "spiral down" for the character and that Aegon feels a "bleak hopelessness" in the episode. Phia Saban felt that Helaena chose not to tell Alicent about her pregnancy because she "feels so powerless in her own life and it's something that just belongs to her, and that's extremely sacred to her" and noted that the murder of Helaena's son in season two has made her afraid of losing another child to the war. Matt Smith stated that the revelation that Rhaena is Sheepstealer's rider forces him to "have to deal with the idea of being a father" to her and how this is in direct conflict with his loyalty to Rhaenyra, while Phoebe Campbell expressed that Sheepstealer alters the dynamic between Rhaena and Daemon, granting her additional power and a sense that she has proved to him that she could do something he didn't believe she was capable of by successfully claiming a dragon.

=== Filming ===
For the scene where Aegon grieves over Sunfyre, the production team created a full-scale practical model of the dragon's head, with production designer Waldo Mason explaining, "traditionally, in this show, whenever there's been a dragon or a dragon's head on set, it's always been a blue shape that we see. But because this Sunfyre was motionless, we could actually make a full-scale model for Tom to interact with." Tom Glynn-Carney, who plays Aegon, described the model as "spectacular" and credits it with helping to illicit his performance in the episode. He compared Aegon's relationship to Sunfyre with that of his own dog and expressed that there is a "supernatural bond" that pairs them together.

The original set of the throne room of the Eyrie from Game of Thrones was rebuilt for the episode, which Condal described as "iconic". It marked the first time House of the Dragon had re-created a set from Game of Thrones since the Red Keep sets were built in season one. Production designer Jim Clay took the original designs of the throne room and made some alterations to the color palette to ensure it did not look identical, since House of the Dragon takes place so many decades prior to Game of Thrones and added a large painted mural depicting the history of the Eyrie. The prop team noted that the wooden throne was the most important thing for them to build, but that the craftsmen who worked on the original set were also part of the House of the Dragon team, which gave them a "head-start" with re-creating it. Director Clare Kilner stated that it was an "interesting set to think about how to block" because of its circular shape and unique layout and that she chose to film the scenes between Daemon and Jeyne with a circular tracking shot in homage to this.

Kilner described the opening scenes of Tumbelton as "the Nazis entering France during the Second World War" and that it was important to her and the team not to depict the city as overly-militarized and to have it look like somewhere people would really live. The set was three quarters of an acre and twice the size of the King's Landing sets, and Condal stated that it was the "biggest set we've ever built" and that the major role it plays in the books made him want to introduce it in a "big way [in the episode] that made it really satisfying". Condal was clear that Tumbleton should have clear architectural differences from King's Landing to show that the town is further south and in a warmer climate, leading the team to travel to Apulia in Italy to conduct research, which inspired the conical-shaped roofs. Costume designer Caroline McCall expressed that she wanted the costumes to feel "really idyllic in terms of its color palette", which inspired the use of harvest tones, cottons, and linens, while set decorator Claire Nia Richards took inspiration from old towns in Spain and Greece, and had a working olive press imported from India to ensure the city felt lived-in and real.

The scenes with Daemon and Rhaena were filmed in a slate quarry in Wales, but the art department had to create their own cave because none of the existing caves were feasibly large enough to house a dragon as big as Sheepstealer. A combination of lighting, CGI, and special effects were used to depict Sheepstealer's fire-breathing and to create an image of Rhaena in silhouette, and that Kilner worked with Smith and Campbell to ensure that the emotional core of the scene remained at the forefront and was not overshadowed by the dragon effects.

=== Casting ===
The episode stars Matt Smith as Daemon Targaryen, Emma D'Arcy as Rhaenyra Targaryen, Olivia Cooke as Alicent Hightower, James Norton as Ormund Hightower, Steve Toussaint as Corlys Velaryon, Fabien Frankel as Criston Cole, Matthew Needham as Larys Strong, Sonoya Mizuno as Mysaria, Tom Glynn-Carney as Aegon II Targaryen, Phia Saban as Helaena Targaryen, Phoebe Campbell as Rhaena Targaryen, Kurt Egyiawan as Orwyle, Freddie Fox as Gwayne Hightower, Gayle Rankin as Alys Rivers, Abubakar Salim as Alyn of Hull, Kieran Bew as Hugh Hammer, Tom Bennett as Ulf White, Ellora Torchia as Kat, Joplin Sibtain as Jon Roxton, and Dan Fogler as Torrhen Manderly.

Co-star Barry Sloane as Adrian Redfort makes his first appearance. Benjamin Evan Ainsworth as Daeron Targaryen makes his first credited appearance in this episode, after appearing uncredited in the season premiere.

== Release ==
The episode premiered on July 12, 2026, on HBO and HBO Max.

== Reception ==
Helen O'Hara of IGN gave the episode a score of 9 out of 10 and wrote, "it's a meaty, schemey episode, and an installment that works particularly hard to move pieces around the board in interesting new combinations". She praised the characterization of James Norton's Ormund, stating, "the combination of such unpredictable violence with his prissy aversion to dirt and fastidious dress sense suggests two things to the seasoned Westeros watcher. One, this guy is going to be fun. Two, he's probably going to endure the smelliest smells that ever stank during his campaign."

Writing for Den of Geek, Alec Bojalad also lauded the depiction of Ormund, calling him "one of the show’s most dynamic figures yet" and wrote, "it's another example of House of the Dragon showrunner Ryan Condal and his team uncovering some captivating character traits in the margins of (fake) history. Why wouldn’t Lord Ormund want his pseudo-son to sit the Iron Throne? Why wouldn't he see himself as a scholarly raconteur despite frequently demonstrating blinding rage? And why wouldn't he have an inexplicably sensitive nose? Those are all human traits and Lord Ormund, as brought to life by James Norton, is human". He felt the show's depiction of the occupation of Tumbleton was "satisfying new ground for the franchise" and, while mixed on the changes to Rhaena's story from the books, praised Phoebe Campbell as "finding some believable desperation ".

Daniel Roman of Winter is Coming wrote, "Tumbleton" is a fascinating episode of House of the Dragon which introduces new characters, new locations, and new problems as the civil war heads into its next stage. The cast and crew for the series are doing amazing work, even as some of the show's writing decisions make it harder for longtime fans of George R.R. Martin's story to reconcile with this new telling. But it leaves enough threads running for plenty of payoff to come in the weeks ahead, and as a bridge episode to get us back into the wider war story of the realm, it does a solid job expanding the scope after Rhaenyra's first bad days as queen in episode 3." He declared the Aegon and Larys storyline his favorite and lauded Tom Glynn-Carney's "stellar" performance and also enjoyed the scene between Alyn and Rhaenyra, praising the performances of Abubakar Salim and Emma D'Arcy. He also called the scene between Rhaena and Daemon as Phoebe Campbell's "single best scene of the series so far" and felt it was "starting to really sell me on her arc as the show's version of Nettles, the dragonseed in the book who rides Sheepstealer" and enjoyed the conversation between Daemon and Jeyne writing, "the verbal sparring here is a lot of fun; Collin is a fantastic actress (with an equally fantastic costume), and Smith is as delightfully vindictive as ever. Plus, it's nice to see the throne room of the Eyrie again." While he was mixed on the decision to darken the relationship between Ormund and Daeron and some elements of the storyline, Roman praised the work of Norton and Benjamin Evan Ainsworth and enjoyed the show's investment into Tumbleton as a new city and site of future conflict, writing, "everything about the production in the Tumbleton storyline is excellent, from the acting to the staging and cinematography, the costuming, and more. But the story itself has some holes, and that made it hard for me to enjoy, especially on my first watch".

Kelcie Mattson of Collider praised the confrontation between Rhaena and Daemon, writing "Daemon discovering Rhaena and Sheepstealer in the Vale brings his non-malicious negligence full circle and belatedly compensates for House of the Dragon not developing a formidable onscreen bond between the Rogue Prince and his eldest children. Even without a foundation, Campbell and Smith's performances are gut-wrenching. Smith, in particular, has rarely portrayed a more defeated or devastated Daemon. He effortlessly oscillates between shock, affection, concerned tenderness, and paternal frustration at a wayward child — all of which are rich and underutilized character shades worth exploring".
