= Rhaenyra Triumphant =

- House of the Dragon episode
- Episode no.: Season 3 Episode 3
- Directed by: Clare Kilner
- Written by: Sara Hess
- Cinematography by: Alejandro Martínez
- Editing by: Crispin Green
- Original air date: July 5, 2026
- Running time: 57 minutes

Guest appearance
- Harry Collett as Jacaerys ("Jace") Velaryon

Episode chronology
← Previous "Queen's Landing"	Next → "Tumbleton"
- House of the Dragon season 3

"Rhaenyra Triumphant" is the third episode of the third season of the fantasy drama television series House of the Dragon. A prequel to Game of Thrones, the series depicts the events leading up to the decline of House Targaryen during a devastating war of succession for the Iron Throne of Westeros known as the "Dance of the Dragons". The episode was written by executive producer Sara Hess and directed by Clare Kilner. It first aired on HBO and HBO Max on July 5, 2026.

In the episode, Rhaenyra, now Queen of the Seven Kingdoms, must face the true reality of ruling in her first few days after taking King's Landing. In a departure from the regular structure of the series, the episode is almost exclusively shown from Rhaenyra's point of view.

The episode received critical acclaim, with praise for the development of Rhaenyra's character, the writing, dramatic tension, adaptation and exploration of the themes in Fire & Blood, the opening scenes, twist ending, and performances of the cast, particularly those of Emma D'Arcy, Matt Smith, Steve Toussaint, and James Norton.

== Plot ==
In the Reach, Daemon and Caraxes, flanked by Hugh and Ulf on their dragons, have Ormund bend the knee to Rhaenyra, which he reluctantly does, and orders him and his army back to Oldtown. Daemon also takes Ormund's ward, Daeron Targaryen, back to King's Landing and recommends that he be executed.

In King's Landing, during her first few days as queen, Rhaenyra is overwhelmed by numerous administrative tasks, requests from starving smallfolk, disagreements between Daemon and Mysaria, and her paranoia that Hightower loyalists remain in the Red Keep. The combination of this and the inability to process her grief impacts Rhaenyra's mental state. She hallucinates Jace, avoids Baela, and cannot sleep alone.

Alicent, whom Rhaenyra keeps locked in the Keep alongside Helaena, suggests she declare Aegon dead since nobody knows his location and his face is unrecognizable due to disfigurement. Rhaenyra faces pushback from the High Septon, who refuses to anoint her without evidence of Aegon's death, and expresses his disgust of dragons. He warns Rhaenyra not to make an enemy of the Faith.

Rhaenyra's plans for her coronation stall when she learns that Tyland had emptied the treasury. Rhaenyra later serves rats to the city's nobility while her men search their homes for hoarded food. (Note: King's Landing is infested with rats due to Aegon hanging all of the rat catchers in "Rhaenyra the Cruel".) Torrhen Manderly admires her attempt to sway the smallfolk into forgetting it was her naval blockade of King's Landing that caused the current crisis. Rhaenyra and Mysaria then give the hoarded food to the smallfolk. When Rhaenyra asks Alicent how she and Viserys coped with the crown's weight, Alicent tells her that as queen, compromising her values will be unavoidable.

Corlys requests that Rhaenyra formally legitimize Alyn and Addam as Velaryons; however, when she and Daemon later knight Addam, Hugh, and Ulf (with titles "Hull", "Hammer", and "White", respectively), she does not keep her word. Corlys angrily confronts Rhaenyra, stating that he and his family supported her children despite knowing they too were bastards. Daemon tells Rhaenyra they should use their dragons to conquer the rest of Westeros, but Rhaenyra resists, citing Viserys' lessons about restraint, which Daemon dismisses as weakness.

After trying to interrogate Daeron, who refuses to speak, Rhaenyra opts to send him to the Wall rather than execute him. As an act of kindness, she allows Alicent to say goodbye to her son, but realizes once Alicent arrives that the boy is an imposter, coerced by Ormund, who has the real Daeron. An injured dragonkeeper arrives and tells Rhaenyra that Ormund's army has occupied the town of Tumbleton and has Daeron's young dragon with him. He dissuades Rhaenyra from attacking, as her own people would die.

== Production ==
=== Writing ===
"Rhaenyra Triumphant" was written by executive producer Sara Hess, and directed by Clare Kilner, who both wrote and directed the previous episode "Queen's Landing". The episode marks Hess' sixth writing credit and Kilner's seventh directing credit.

Emma D'Arcy, who plays Rhaenyra, compared the episode as akin to a "CEO finally getting to have a look at the balance sheet" and praised the "pragmatism" of Hess' script. They felt that the revelation of Ormund's deception as "the beginning of a kind of paranoia for Rhaenyra" and explained that, "Ormund is a totally unknown quantity; he's this kind of erratic element. And I think increasingly, and we see this as we go forward, he sort of becomes the boogeyman for Rhaenyra, and fuels a broader distrust of her council, her allies, her court at large. There's something wonderfully theatrical, I think, about that scene, about a case of mistaken identity, about a plant and discovering a stranger inside the castle walls. I think, again, that act does a lot intensify a distrust that Rhaenyra is feeling. A lack of stability in her position." D'Arcy stated that returning to King's Landing after so long away fed into Rhaenyra's behavior in the episode, noting that, "I like the idea that even in a case such as hers, there's no immunity to the sort of forced regression of the family home", and that being back in the Red Keep brings up a lot of memories of her father Viserys and the type of ruler he was, and how this conflicts with the type of ruler Daemon is pushing her to be. They also discussed Rhaenyra's mental state, expressing that the loss of Jace has contributed to her "feeling of instability, of having no safe harbor, no psychic safety, and the accompanying desire for legitimacy, a growing obsession, actually, with sort of legitimizing her standing" which D'Arcy felt was due to unresolved grief. On Rhaenyra's need for legitimacy, D'Arcy described the feast with the nobles as a "publicity stunt" and the "first propaganda exercise of her tenureship" on the throne.

Discussing Corlys' shifting priorities, Steve Toussaint explained that Rhaenyra's refusal to legitimize Addam and Alyn fits in with the overall character arc for Corlys set out by showrunner Ryan Condal, who told Toussaint when he was first cast in season one: "we want to meet the Sea Snake as a man who has everything, and we're going to slowly, or not so slowly, strip everything away from him." Toussaint felt this development was "par for the course", with Corlys having also now lost his wife, two children, grandson, and home, and expressed that he enjoyed the "acting challenge" of depicting all of this grief and anger. Toussaint explained that Corlys is especially motivated to ensure that Alyn is "set up" following their conversation on the boat in the season premiere, and that, while Addam is also important to him, he has his status as a dragonrider to fall back on. Of his confrontation with Rhaenyra, Toussaint stated, "one of the things I think motors him through the rest of the season is this sense of rage and indignation, of how much he's sacrificed and what he's got in return. For him, that request – recognise my boys – it's not a big deal. I recognised your two sons as mine, and everybody knew there was no way they were Velaryon, but I did it anyway." He noted that Corlys openly accusing Rhaenyra's sons of being bastards was something he did "without thinking" and described it as "a very dangerous thing to do" and noting, "I feel like he's completely at the end of his tether. In that moment, he doesn't care" and felt that Corlys would be ready to accept the consequences of saying such a thing even if it wasn't something he had said intentionally.

=== Filming ===
Kilner's goal for the episode was to visually highlight Rhaenyra reckoning with the power she holds in ways big and small and how it affects her psychologically. She stated that Condal gave her a three episode block depicting the start of Rhaenyra's reign because of her interest in exploring the show's family dysfunction and dramatic scenes, as well as the deep exploration of the characters. She advised that "Rhaenyra Triumphant" was filmed in its entirety before she began work on the previous episode, "Queen's Landing", or the following episode. Discussing "Rhaenyra Triumpant", Kilner explained, "we really, really wanted to show Rhaenyra's internal conflict and the inner workings of her mind and express it visually" and stated that she worked with the camera operators and cinematographer to "figure out certain lenses that could narrow things down from Rhaenyra's point of view and depth of field". She also chose not to film many scenes over the shoulder of anyone who Rhaenyra was talking to, which she described as a "big decision" and a "stressful episode to film" which was challenging for D'Arcy, who had just had knee surgery. In addition to depicting Rhaenyra's mental state, Kilner stated, "we also wanted to try and show the everyday workings of how you reign and run a kingdom. What does it entail? I also loved filming the scene that Sara Hess wrote about Rhaenyra getting her period. It's just so interesting because that always happens to us women. It's the most important day of your life, so of course, you get your period at the same time."

=== Casting ===
The episode stars Matt Smith as Daemon Targaryen, Emma D'Arcy as Rhaenyra Targaryen, Olivia Cooke as Alicent Hightower, James Norton as Ormund Hightower, Steve Toussaint as Corlys Velaryon, Sonoya Mizuno as Mysaria, Bethany Antonia as Baela Targaryen, Phia Saban as Helaena Targaryen, Kurt Egyiawan as Orwyle, Abubakar Salim as Alyn of Hull, Clinton Liberty as Addam of Hull, Kieran Bew as Hugh Hammer, Tom Bennett as Ulf White, Joplin Sibtain as Jon Roxton, and Dan Fogler as Torrhen Manderly.

Harry Collett appears as Jacaerys Velaryon in a hallucination of Rhaenyra's following his death in the season premiere, and is credited as a guest star. Fogler makes his first appearance and joins the main cast in this episode.

== Release ==
The episode premiered on July 5, 2026, on HBO and HBO Max.

== Reception ==
Some reviewers deemed "Rhaenyra Triumphant" to be one of the best episodes of the third season.

Helen O'Hara of IGN gave the episode a score of 9 out of 10 and wrote, "from the impossibly cool pre-opening credits scene to Rhaenyra ultimately swearing to burn all who stand against her, this episode moves almost too fast to track; no wonder Rhaenyra dissociates as she sits on her uncomfortable throne." She described the exploration of the reality of ruling as "surprisingly compelling" and described the entire episode as "unbearably tense". O'Hara also lauded the opening scene with Daemon and Ormund, calling it "one of the more striking images in Westeros' TV history" and praised the performance of James Norton, expressing excitement that he has been revealed as a "major player" and will be more heavily featured moving forward.

Writing for Den of Geek, Alec Bojalad gave the episodes 4 stars out of 5, writing "though House of the Dragon's third season kicked off with two season finale-level episodes that feature some of the most consequential moments from George R.R. Martin's Fire & Blood, this is the first hour in which the show truly feels like itself again. At its best, any Game of Thrones story is about the frustrating impossibility of governance. And governance has rarely felt more frustrating or impossible than it does for Rhaenyra here." He lauded Hess' script, stating that, "Viserys' headstrong daughter feels the weight of the crown before she's even worn it to her coronation yet. And thanks to plenty of Sorkin-esque walking-and-talking, there's nowhere in the Red Keep she can go to escape it. Even when the day ends, she must retreat to the bed her father wasted away in," and praising how the episode "carefully and empathetically" depicts Rhaenyra's period pains. Bojalad also enjoyed the opening scene with Daemon and Ormund, describing it as a "perfect table-setter" and the twist ending as an "equally perfect bookend", and called the entire episode a "consistently tense, thematically on point episode of House of the Dragon" and positively commented on the humorous elements, particularly highlighting Matt Smith's Daemon.

Liam Gaughan of Collider declared the episode "not only the best episode of House of the Dragon thus far, but a template for what the overall Game of Thrones franchise should strive for in the future" and wrote that it was, "a creative episode that not only examines the consequences of warfare but also provides emotional context for the season's preceding events" and one that "different perspective on a very familiar location" due to being primarily set in King's Landing. It's the type of episode that also could've been dismissed as "filler" if it weren't such a fascinating character showcase". He praised the "refreshing" and "expansive" exploration of leadership from Rhaenyra's perspective and how the episode helped to "solidify the complexity" of the character, showcasing her "inner turmoil that [she] feels as her personal ethics and governmental duties clash" and lauded Emma D'Arcy's "amazing performance".

Josh Rosenberg of Esquire was similarly positive, expressing that he felt that the season felt as if it was "in full effect". He lauded the twist that Daeron was an imposter, writing, "there's one surprise at the end of the episode that should work for both newcomers and fans of George R.R. Martin's Fire & Blood alike. It's a fun twist that should remind other TV writers how they can wield the need to remain faithful to the IP as a weapon—and not just a crutch." Rosenberg compared the episode as "The Pitt for King's Landing" due to the number of problems Rhaenyra has to contend with, and commented on how the show has depicted Rhaenyra's experiences as a female ruler with those of Aegon and Aemond in previous episodes.
