= Queen's Landing (House of the Dragon) =

- House of the Dragon episode
- Episode no.: Season 3 Episode 2
- Directed by: Clare Kilner
- Written by: Sara Hess
- Cinematography by: Alejandro Martínez
- Editing by: Adam Bosman
- Original air date: June 28, 2026
- Running time: 64 minutes

Guest appearance
- Rhys Ifans as Otto Hightower (uncredited)

Episode chronology
← Previous "Salt and Sea, Fire and Blood"	Next → "Rhaenyra Triumphant"
- House of the Dragon season 3

"Queen's Landing" is the second episode of the third season of the fantasy drama television series House of the Dragon. A prequel to Game of Thrones, the series depicts the events leading up to the decline of House Targaryen during a devastating war of succession for the Iron Throne of Westeros known as the "Dance of the Dragons". The episode was written by executive producer Sara Hess and directed by Clare Kilner. It first aired on HBO and HBO Max on June 28, 2026.

In the episode, Rhaenyra must come to terms with the fallout from the Battle of the Gullet and finally puts her plan into motion to take King's Landing as Alicent prepares for her arrival. Aemond heads to Harrenhal and Rhaena is stricken with guilt, while Aegon and Larys' journey is interrupted.

The episode received critical acclaim, with praise for its directing, plot momentum, and Emma D'Arcy's performance.

== Plot ==
At the Gullet, Addam, Hugh, and Ulf destroy the last of the Triarchy fleet with their dragons. Addam later finds Corlys and brings him ashore. With High Tide destroyed, Corlys offers to have Alyn legitimized as a Velaryon.

In the Vale, Rhaena is distraught by Sheepstealer's actions at the Gullet and requests asylum from Jeyne, who allows her to remain to protect the Vale.

In the Crownlands, Triarchy men who survived the Battle of the Gullet attack the wagon escorting the captive Aegon and Larys, allowing them to escape. Despite Larys' protests, Aegon plans to go to Rook's Rest, the site of his disfigurement, to search for his dragon Sunfyre.

In the Riverlands, Daemon and his forces celebrate their victory when Simon arrives to inform Daemon about Jace's death. Before departing for Dragonstone, Daemon is approached by Alys who tells him she wants Harrenhal for helping him rally the Rivermen, but Daemon refuses due to her low status and the castle's strategic importance. Enraged, Alys warns him to leave and never return. Aemond flies to Harrenhal on Vhagar looking for Daemon and kills everyone he encounters, including Simon and his sons Germund and Paxter, though Paxter wounds him. Aemond then sees Alys and pleads her for help before passing out.

At Dragonstone, Baela brings Jace's body to Rhaenyra. Devastated, Rhaenyra admonishes her advisors for their inaction before retiring to her room to grieve. Rhaenyra questions whether her campaign for the Iron Throne is worth it, as it has cost her two sons. (Note: Jace's younger brother Luke was killed by Aemond and Vhagar in "The Black Queen".) Daemon arrives to comfort Rhaenyra and reveals his Song of Ice and Fire vision at Harrenhal. Rhaenyra, Daemon, Hugh, and Ulf then fly to King's Landing on their dragons.

In King's Landing, with Helaena's help, Alicent convinces both the City Watch led by Luthor Largent and the Hightower soldiers to stand down, anticipating Rhaenyra's arrival. Jasper confronts Alicent, accuses her of treason, and attempts to rape her, but Orwyle intervenes and has Jasper arrested. Rhaenyra and Daemon arrive at the Red Keep, where Daemon slays several Hightower guards. The City Watch, still loyal to Daemon, arrest the remaining Hightower supporters. Daemon is shown a "gift" left to him by Larys: an imprisoned Otto. Daemon convinces the reluctant Rhaenyra to execute Otto, and Daemon beheads Jasper. Alicent and Helaena, who tried to flee the city, are brought to Rhaenyra as she sits on the Iron Throne.

== Production ==
=== Writing ===
"Queen's Landing" was written by executive producer Sara Hess, and directed by Clare Kilner. The episode marks Hess' fifth writing credit and Kilner's sixth directing credit. Like its predecessor, the majority of the episode was written in 2023 prior to the filming of season two, as showrunner Ryan Condal originally intended for that season to run for ten episodes. Following interruptions to production due to the Writers Guild of America strike and budget cuts across Warner Bros. Pictures, the episode had to be moved to the third season.

Discussing Corlys' headspace, Steve Toussaint explained, "I think he's very defeated. Possibly, for the first time, he's realizing the overall futility of war generally, and the cost of war to everybody — so-called winners and losers. And, of course, the cost to him of this particular struggle that he has become involved in through his kinship with the Targaryen family after the promise he made to his late wife that he would support Rhaenyra." He also expressed that the scene on the beach with Addam, Alyn, and Baela depicts Corlys' beginning to understand that "your wealth is in your family and the people whose lives you affect", and that his relationship to Rhaenyra will become more "complicated" despite him believing in her claim to the throne.

Regarding the scene where Rhaenyra finally sits on the Iron Throne, Emma D'Arcy explained, "I certainly thought there was a lot of scope to kind of rob that moment of its triumph, which, for my money, feels honest in a family where the political ambition and the personal, interpersonal strife are sort of part of the same thing. I felt there was an opportunity in that scene to look at how power and the pursuit of power, the toll that that takes on identity, on the body, on one's sense of self, so that by the time she does finally claim that seat, so long dreamt of, she's kind of rudderless in some way, and actually may be finally claiming the sort of thing that could actually cause an identity crisis."

Olivia Cooke, who plays Alicent, stated that she feels her character wasn't "really thinking that politically" when making her bargain with Rhaenyra and was more focused on protecting herself and Heleaena, and that seeing Otto dead was not something she had anticipated. D'Arcy agreed, explaining that, "there's an important point that the show makes about rulers of any kind being insulated from their acts of violence. And in this moment, Rhaenyra's not insulated."

=== Filming ===
Harry Collett, who played Jacaerys, lauded his co-star Emma D'Arcy's performance as Rhaenyra, and expressed how challenging it was to play dead while on the receiving end of their performance, stating, "the performance was like unbelievable and was so real. And I mean, watched the episode now, like on screen, which I properly got to see it there. But even just hearing their voice, just screaming and obviously [the weight] down on my body and it was just such a real reaction. And they had to do that for like 10 hours that whole day." Speaking on Rhaenyra's grief, D'Arcy explained, "I think the truth is, for Rhaenyra, it's an insurmountable loss, and it's a reality that is too terrible to reckon with". They described the scene where Rhaenyra tries to speak to Jace's corpse as the only scene they were dreading filming in the whole season due to the emotional toll, expressing that, "And whenever you shoot something like that, it does mean letting go of a really treasured cast member and friend — and added to which, imagining those things is painful.".

Director Clare Kilner explained that she wanted to keep the camera focused on Rhaenyra as much as possible during the scenes in the throne room of King's Landing. Kilner felt that Rhaenyra was "forced to go out of her comfort zone" and that she wanted the audience to think about how someone confronts their emotions as a public figure. Kilner described the episode's closing scenes where Rhaenyra takes the throne as particularly challenging because of the logistical demands explaining that, "...I wanted to illustrate the violence by showing how Rhaenyra steps on Otto's blood to go to the throne, and the reflection of her going toward it in the blood. There was so much to think about, even things I thought would be relatively easy to pull off, like the bloody footsteps showing her going up to the Iron Throne. We had to soak sponges on the bottom of Emma's shoes, then they had to step through the blood that we had to then enhance with CGI, and all while we had to work out the angle of the blood and where the reflections fall." She expressed that additional challenges included Rhys Ifans only being available for two days of filming and her sense of having a "huge responsibility to the fans to deliver something momentous and cinematic". Kilner felt that the episode's ending focusing on Rhaenyra's vulnerability brought it full circle, as the opening scenes depicted her vulnerability following her discovery of Jace's death.

=== Casting ===
The episode stars Matt Smith as Daemon Targaryen, Emma D'Arcy as Rhaenyra Targaryen, Olivia Cooke as Alicent Hightower, Steve Toussaint as Corlys Velaryon, Fabien Frankel as Criston Cole, Matthew Needham as Larys Strong, Sonoya Mizuno as Mysaria, Tom Glynn-Carney as Aegon II Targaryen, Ewan Mitchell as Aemond Targaryen, Harry Collett as Jacaerys Velaryon, Bethany Antonia as Baela Targaryen, Phia Saban as Helaena Targaryen, Phoebe Campbell as Rhaena Targaryen, Kurt Egyiawan as Orwyle, Freddie Fox as Gwayne Hightower, Gayle Rankin as Alys Rivers, Abubakar Salim as Alyn of Hull, Clinton Liberty as Addam of Hull, Kieran Bew as Hugh Hammer, Tom Bennett as Ulf White, Ellora Torchia as Kat, Tommy Flanagan as Roderick Dustin, and Simon Russell Beale as Simon Strong.

It marks the final appearance of Beale as Simon Strong, and co-star Paul Kennedy as Jasper Wylde, following the death of both characters. Rhys Ifans appears as Otto Hightower but is uncredited, and the episode marks his final appearance following Otto's execution. Despite his character's death in the previous episode, Collett remains listed in the opening credits, as his character Jacaerys appears as a corpse. Flanagan joins the main cast in this episode after co-starring in the previous episode, and co-star Tom Cullen as Luthor Largent makes his first appearance.

== Release ==
The episode premiered on June 28, 2026, on HBO and HBO Max.

== Reception ==
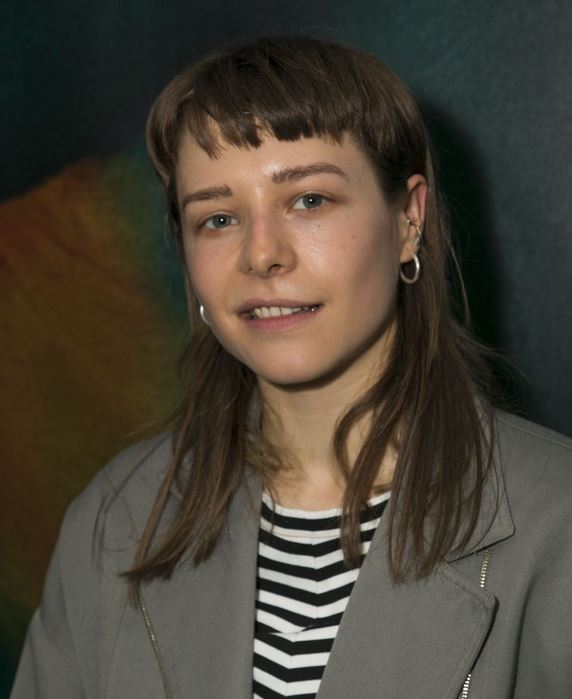
Critics acclaimed Emma D'Arcy's performance as Rhaenyra Targaryen in the episode.

Helen O'Hara of IGN gave the episode a score of 9 out of 10 and wrote, "it's not as spectacular or as action-packed as the season opener, but moments of real drama and strategic progress still make this feel like essential viewing." She also praised the depiction of Jace Velaryon and the forward momentum of the plot.

Josh Rosenberg of Esquire was similarly enthusiastic, expressing that the episode "feels like the point where this season really begins." He praised the depiction of Alys Rivers in the episode writing, "I commend showrunner Ryan Condal for writing Rivers as a better character than George R. R. Martin ever did".

Daniel Roman of Winter is Coming praised the scenes on Dragonstone and handling of the aftermath of Jace's death, calling them "beautifully tragic" and highlighting the "haunting cinematography and score". He lauded Emma D'Arcy's performance, writing, "D'Arcy delivers an astounding performance in this scene, grieving over Jace's body and aptly portraying the push-and-pull between Rhaenyra's agony at losing her son and fury at him for defying her — and inadvertently wounding her in a way from which she'll never fully recover." He also praised the performances of Phoebe Campbell and Amanda Collin as Rhaena and Jeyne Arryn during the scenes at the Vale, noting, "it's the only brief scene we get with these characters in episode 2, but it's a good one." He was critical of Alys Rivers' role in the episode, but enjoyed the brief scenes with Larys and Aegon, describing Tom Glynn-Carney as "giving a career-best performance as Aegon, now in his tortured, exiled king phase where very movement is agony and every interaction humbling". He praised the performances of Steve Toussaint and Abubakar Salim during the scene where Corlys legitimizes Alyn, calling it a "touching payoff". Roman lauded the Harrenhal scenes, noting "Mitchell perfectly captured both Aemond's physicality and his quiet villainy", and enjoyed the introduction of Ser Largent, praising Tom Cullen's "real charisma", but was highly critical of the attempted rape of Alicent, writing, "I cannot emphasize it enough: I loathe this choice of House of the Dragon, which cannot seem to figure out what to do with Alicent unless it's heaping yet more humiliations on her for totally arbitrary reasons". He enjoyed the scenes of Rhaenyra and Daemon taking King's Landing and the twist that Otto was being kept in the Red Keep all along, but questioned the choice to have Rhaenyra behead him and not one of her subjects.

In a more mixed review, Alec Bojalad was critical of some of the script's dialogue. He did praise D'Arcy's performance however, writing, "the religious awe that D'Arcy imbues upon Rhaenyra's first ascendance onto the throne is affecting enough to retroactively make the whole journey worth it" and later states, "there are several examples of sheer acting talent making up for questionable script decisions through this episode. One comes from an earlier D'Arcy scene in which a heartbroken Rhaenyra chastises Jace's body as though he were still alive. The queen balling her fists and waving them over her dead son as if he wants to strike him but can't bring herself to make the connection, is truly brilliant." He lauded Aemond's attack on Harrenhal, expressing that "just about every element works in perfect concert".
