= Salt and Sea, Fire and Blood =

Episode One of the Third installment of HBO's House of the Dragon(HOTD) series.

- House of the Dragon episode
- Episode no.: Season 3 Episode 1
- Directed by: Loni Peristere
- Written by: Ryan Condal
- Cinematography by: PJ Dillon
- Editing by: Crispin Green
- Original air date: June 21, 2026
- Running time: 65 minutes

Episode chronology
← Previous "The Queen Who Ever Was"	Next → "Queen's Landing"
- House of the Dragon season 3

"Salt and Sea, Fire and Blood" is the season premiere of the third season of the fantasy drama television series House of the Dragon. A prequel to Game of Thrones, the series depicts the events leading up to the decline of House Targaryen during a devastating war of succession for the Iron Throne of Westeros known as the "Dance of Dragons". The episode was written by series co-creator Ryan Condal and directed by Loni Peristere. It first aired on HBO and HBO Max on June 21, 2026.

In the episode, which directly follows the second season finale, Alicent returns to King's Landing after her clandestine meeting with Rhaenyra to find that Aegon is gone and Aemond has declared himself king. Rhaenyra prepares her forces to take King's Landing and Rhaena attempts to claim the wild dragon Sheepstealer, while Aegon and Larys begin their journey on the road. Spurred by her deal with Tyland, Sharako Lohar and the Triarchy fleet launch an attack on Corlys and the Velaryon fleet at the Gullet, with the ensuing battle becoming one of the largest naval skirmishes in Westeros' history.

The episode received critical acclaim for its production values, writing, emotional beats, cast performances (particularly Steve Toussaint, Abigail Thorn, Harry Collett, Olivia Cooke, and James Norton), and the adaptation of the much-anticipated Battle of the Gullet, though some reviewers noted that the episode suffered somewhat from having to be moved from the end of season two to season three.

== Plot ==
In the Vale, a delirious Rhaena approaches the wild dragon Sheepstealer and forms an uneasy bond. Rhaena then mounts Sheepstealer and takes flight.

In the Crownlands, Aegon and Larys are stopped by soldiers loyal to Rhaenyra. When Aegon refuses to bend the knee, Larys reveals Aegon's identity and convinces the soldiers that he and Aegon could be valuable hostages.

In King's Landing, Aemond threatens to kill Orwyle if he does not disclose Aegon's location, but is stopped by Jasper, who reveals that Larys is also missing. Alicent returns to the city to find that Aemond has declared himself king. She forges a letter from Aemond and sends it to her cousin Ormund Hightower, who leads the Hightower forces. Alicent then encourages Aemond to leave King's Landing and seize Harrenhal, warning him that Rhaenyra will kill him if he remains.

In the Riverlands, the Lannister army, led by Jason, clashes with Daemon's forces but is overwhelmed. Roderick Dustin and the Winter Wolves arrive in the aftermath, (Note: Jace secured the aid of the North in "A Son for a Son".) and Roderick presents Jason's severed head to Daemon. On the Isle of Faces near Harrenhal, Ulf recounts his abusive childhood to Addam and Hugh while they await to ambush Aemond. Alys appears and warns them that they are missing a battle. At their camp, Criston tells Gwayne that they will die if Aemond does not join them.

At Dragonstone, Rhaenyra tells her allies that Alicent has agreed to surrender King's Landing. Jace warns her that Alicent cannot be trusted, but Rhaenyra affirms her faith in Alicent. Baela alerts them to fighting at the Gullet, and Rhaenyra plans to assist on Syrax. Fearing for his mother's safety, Jace has Rhaenyra confined to her room.

At the Gullet, Corlys admits to Alyn his failings as a father. They are interrupted when Sharako Lohar arrives with the Triarchy fleet and attacks the Velaryon fleet. Jace and Baela aid Corlys on their dragons Vermax and Moondancer. A harpoon briefly ensnares Vermax, but Moondancer breaks him free. Fueled by hatred of Corlys, Lohar orders her men to sack High Tide and pursues Corlys through a rocky pass. After throwing Tyland and his men overboard so her ship loses weight, she rams Corlys' ship. Lohar duels Corlys, but he falls overboard. When the ship breaks apart, Alyn fights and kills Lohar. Rhaena joins the battle but is unable to control Sheepstealer, who begins burning ships indiscriminately. Sheepstealer then attacks Moondancer, with Vermax in pursuit. Vermax is hit by a scorpion bolt and falls into the sea. Jace swims to the surface as Vermax drowns, only to be killed by Triarchy bowmen.

== Production ==
=== Writing ===
"Salt and Sea, Fire and Blood" was written by series co-creator Ryan Condal, and directed by Loni Peristere. The episode marks Condal's seventh writing credit and Peristere's second directing credit after "The Red Sowing". It is the second episode in the Game of Thrones television franchise to feature the motto of House Targaryen in the title, following "Fire and Blood", the season finale of the first season of Game of Thrones. The majority of the episode was written in 2023 prior to the filming of season two, as Condal originally intended for that season to run for ten episodes, but following interruptions to production due to the Writers Guild of America strike and budget cuts across Warner Bros. Pictures, the episode had to be moved to the start of the third season.

Tom Bennett stated that he was made aware of Ulf's tragic and abusive backstory back when his character was first introduced in season two, noting that Condal had already written the speech Ulf makes in "Salt and Sea, Fire and Blood" prior to the character's debut in "Rhaenyra the Cruel", and gave Bennett a copy to help inform his performance.

Of Aemond's motivation to kiss his mother Alicent, Ewan Mitchell explained, "Aemond's trying to read between the lines, see if there is an ulterior motive there. When I read it in the script for the first time, I just thought, "Oh, that's something. Quite out there." I kind of saw it coming with everything that I've explored with Aemond and his relationship with Alicent" and that Aemond now views himself as the head of the family following the disappearances of Otto and Aegon and is trying to establish his power. Olivia Cooke added that Alicent was unaware of the "Oedipal undercurrent" to their relationship and that she finds the kiss "shocking" but goes along with it because "she knows that one wrong facial expression, one perceived rejection, will cost her her life. So she's trying to tread very, very carefully. But I do think she's sort of stupefied in that moment."

Discussing Rhaenyra's frustrations with her council, Emma D'Arcy advised that, "for two seasons we've seen Rhaenyra restrained from action, often by her male council. And at the start of Season 3, there's finally huge momentum in her campaign, and she is poised to move into action. That momentum hits a very sudden brick wall — or locked door", and that she takes her rage and internalised misogyny out by destroying her riding leathers. Of Jace being the one to imprison Rhaenyra, D'Arcy said, "there's something interesting going on here, where something that's framed as protection or care is actually an arm of control. I think that's a strong tool within the toolkit of patriarchy".

Speaking on his character Jace's decision to defy Rhaenyra, Harry Collett stated, "she has been fighting so hard to keep me at home and keep me safe because she knows that I'm the heir. Now, he's playing the 'I don't want to listen to mum. I'm gonna be my own man now,' which is completely fair enough because 16 in the Game of Thrones world is probably 30-odd." Collett asked if he could shout the iconic "dracarys" command during the battle, which wasn't in the original script, joking that there was "no way" he could leave the show without saying it. Of his character Jace's death, Collett was aware of his fate when he initially signed onto the show in season one and that Condal called him to talk him through the scenes. He described it as "the perfect death" and that his time on the show had been an "absolute joy", noting that there was "no way Jace couldn't have died" once he'd made up his mind to ride into battle. Collett stated that Jace felt "young and vulnerable" once he was separated from Vermax and the first arrow hit him, and that he believes that Jace's final thoughts would be him regretting his decision to go and wishing his mother Rhaenyra was with him.

Abigail Thorn, who plays Lohar, stated that she had a lot of input into her character's death and emotional arc throughout the episode. She explained, "the script just says that they fight and she dies - and I decided that in her very final moments, she is just a woman who is afraid. There's that beautiful moment where [Alyn] lifts her up out of the water, and all the blood and grime has washed off her face, and she's just a woman who is scared. And in that final moment, I think you see everything that this battle and this quest has cost her, and it makes [Alyn] look like a real monster as well."

=== Filming ===
Condal described the Battle of the Gullet scenes as "unlike anything that's ever been done on television before" and referred to the undertaking as "kind of crazy and frankly irresponsible" but that the effort was "necessary" and "a seminal moment for the show". The episode used three million litres of water, four boat sets, wet, dry, and underwater tanks, 15,000 stunt crowds, 3,500 props, and 25 tons of propane, with the production team setting a new Guinness World Record when 23 stunt performers were ignited in one take. Each actor was briefed with models and pictures as well as discussions around their emotional journey throughout the battle, plus weeks of stunt choreography. Steve Toussaint, who plays Corlys, spoke of the challenge of transitioning from the gym training to performing the stunts on the slippery moving sets in heavy armour, joking that, "there was one move that I had where I was supposed to kick somebody in the chest, and I was like, "Yeah, that's gonna look sexy," and then I put the armor on, I couldn't get my feet above his knees!". Abigail Thorn, who plays Lohar, stated that she put on almost 15kg of muscle during the boxing and sword training, while Abubakar Salim, who plays Alyn, expressed of the first day of filming felt appropriately chaotic stating, "the energy was almost like a mosh pit and it was frightening because it wasn't about picking sides; it was about surviving and you could feel that. I remember swiping against someone on my own side and being like, "No! You should be swiping over here!" But I think that's what's kind of cool and magical about it". Harry Collett who plays Jace spent the majority of his filming in the studio trying to figure out how to effectively emote while on dragonback and spoke of how the wind machines were so forceful that Peristere had to direct him using a megaphone.

Peristere, a self-described "fanboy" of George R. R. Martin's books, stated that he wanted the battle to be "epic" and that he and his core creative team were inspired by a painting of the Battle of Trafalgar and the 2003 film Master and Commander: The Far Side of the World which helped inform their approach to capturing the naval scenes. Peristere wanted everything taking place on the ships to feel "legitimate and real and present", opting to use largely uninterrupted cuts to keep the viewers in the action with the characters, and that he worked extensively with the background actors, many of whom had real naval experience, to ensure that everyone on screen was "doing the right thing". Filming the battle took excessive planning, and Peristere stated that he created a 186-page document detailing what each department needed to do in order to execute his vision, and that he and the team were challenged by the budget and tight filming schedule. He also spent time talking with the cast to ensure that the episode was centred on the characters and the "human drama" in addition to the action and spectacle.

Collett spend two full days filming Jace's death scenes in a cold water tank, being repeatedly dunked while strapped to a motorised saddle with a team of scuba divers on standby in case of emergency. He noted that the show's medic briefly thought he'd developed hypothermia when some of the dye from Jace's riding gloves began to color his fingers blue, something Collett described as "one of my funniest moments of filming" once he realized he was not actually in danger. He called the scenes "the hardest acting I've ever done in my life" due to the challenges associated with playing dead, and keeping his eyes open and staying afloat in the water tank.

=== Casting ===
The episode stars Matt Smith as Daemon Targaryen, Emma D'Arcy as Rhaenyra Targaryen, Olivia Cooke as Alicent Hightower, James Norton as Ormund Hightower, Steve Toussaint as Corlys Velaryon, Fabien Frankel as Criston Cole, Matthew Needham as Larys Strong, Sonoya Mizuno as Mysaria, Tom Glynn-Carney as Aegon II Targaryen, Ewan Mitchell as Aemond Targaryen, Harry Collett as Jacaerys Velaryon, Phia Saban as Helaena Targaryen, Bethany Antonia as Baela Targaryen, Jefferson Hall as Tyland and Jason Lannister, Abubakar Salim as Alyn of Hull, Clinton Liberty as Addam of Hull, Phoebe Campbell as Rhaena Targaryen, Kurt Egyiawan as Orwyle, Freddie Fox as Gwayne Hightower, Gayle Rankin as Alys Rivers, Kieran Bew as Hugh Hammer, Tom Bennett as Ulf White, and Joplin Sibtain as Jon Roxton.

It marks the final appearance of Hall as Jason Lannister, and co-star Abigail Thorn as Sharako Lohar, following the death of both characters. Norton and Sibtain make their first appearance and join the main cast in this episode, with co-stars Tommy Flanagan as Roderick Dustin and Annie Shapero as Alysanne Blackwood also making their first appearance. Co-star Benjamin Evan Ainsworth as Daeron Targaryen makes his first appearance, but is uncredited.

== Release ==
The episode premiered on June 21, 2026, on HBO and HBO Max.

== Reception ==
=== Ratings ===
In the United States, "Salt and Sea, Fire and Blood" was watched by a total of 21.5 million viewers across HBO and HBO Max, down 8% from the second season premiere "A Son for a Son", though it is noted that this episode had to compete with the 2026 FIFA World Cup. Reports state that anticipation for the episode, and the third season overall, led to an increase in viewership for the first two seasons leading up to the debut of the season three premiere.

=== Critical response ===
The episode received acclaim from critics. On the review aggregator Rotten Tomatoes, it holds an approval rating of 92% based on 12 reviews, with an average rating of 7.8/10. The critics consensus says, "Season three sets sail with a stellar nautical battle of Salt and Sea that sternly satisfies the series' long-awaited return, only to bring more Fire and Blood of the utmost intensity, nerve-wracking, and exhilarating."

Helen O'Hara of IGN gave the episode a score of 10 out of 10. She felt that the long-awaited Battle of the Gullet "hugely exciting", and "every bit as spectacular as we could have hoped, all pirate battles and flaming missiles and hand-to-hand combat. It's surrounded by the sort of scheming, seduction, confession and devastation that makes for good character drama too." She praised the performance of Abigail Thorn as Lohar and called the death of Jace "devastating", but was somewhat mixed on the decision to have Rhaeneyra quote Elizabeth I. She remarked that "if the rest of the season is anything like this, this Game of Thrones spin-off might finally have a way to outfight its predecessor."

Writing for Den of Geek, Alec Bojalad wrote that, "Ryan Condal, and the rest of production clearly put real time and money into this momentous occasion and it shows. While the watery, smoke-filled melee doesn't quite reach the same dramatic heights as Game of Thrones classics like the Battle of the Bastards or Blackwater, it's a suitably epic and bloody affair that kicks the season off on a strong note." He praised Condal's script for balancing the Battle of the Gullet's naval and aerial dragon elements and the addition of Rhaena and Sheepstealer, a deviation from the books. Bokalad called Jace's death "one of the more striking images presented on the show yet" and the overall spectacle of the battle. He was more mixed on the rest of the episode, describing each of the other storylines as "conceptually strong" but "hit-or-miss" in their execution" that impacts the momentum of the episode, though feels this is somewhat understandable due to the episode's "likely status as a season 2 holdover". Outside of the Battle of the Gullet, he felt the new characters portrayed by James Norton and Tommy Flanagan, revelation of Ulf's backstory, and scenes between Aemond and Alicent were the main highlights.

In a positive review, Josh Rosenberg of Esquire wrote, "showrunner Ryan Condal is damn near spot-on in calling the season 3 premiere the "craziest episode of TV ever made," even if it feels more like the displaced season 2 finale that fans deserved two years ago." He lauded the Battle of the Gullet, calling it "well worth the wait", particularly enjoying the scene where Corlys manoeuvres his ship through the rocky pass, and calling the fight between Alyn and Lohar "easily the climactic highlight". He also praised Norton's brief introduction as Ormund Hightower, and the performances of Olivia Cooke and Ewan Mitchell during the Alicent and Aemond kiss.

Daniel Roman of Winter is Coming wrote, "when we look back on House of the Dragon, there's no question that this episode is going to be in the conversation for one of the best the show ever executed. That's not to say it doesn't have some flaws, especially in terms of how it stands in conversation with its source material, but the overall package undeniably delivers." He praised the episode's score, the VFX on the dragons, particularly on Sheepstealer, and Phoebe Campbell's performance as Rhaena despite "complicated feelings" on alterations of her story from the books. He also lauded the performances of Cooke and Mitchell, writing, "the verbal sparring between Cooke and Mitchell is excellently delivered, as both Alicent and Aemond realize they've been caught flat-footed by various schemes, even as others move around them without their knowledge", but was critical of the decision to have Aemond kiss her, expressing that it "feels like the writers wanted to remind us of Aemond's issues, and shoe-horned it in". He highlighted Tom Glynn-Carney's performance as Aegon a "standout", Thorn's performance as Lohar, and declared Jace's scenes with Ser Laurent and later with Baela "Harry Collett's two best scenes of the entire series", and praised the conversation between Corlys and Alyn prior to the Battle of the Gullet. Roman called the Battle itself "spectacular" and enjoyed both the dragons and the "grude match" between Corlys and Lohar, and praised the directing and fight choreography. He also felt that the episode "stuck the landing" in regard to Jace's death, and called it "thrilling television that will no doubt stand the test of time as one of the show's best episodes".

Julia Moore of People.com notes, "[T]he chaos prompts a truly shocking move from Aemond (Ewan Mitchell). During a tense conversation with his mom, Alicent (Olivia Cooke), he then kissed Alicent on the lips. It's a moment that, as Mitchell tells PEOPLE, "kind of makes you want to throw up in your mouth a little bit."
