= Jacaerys Velaryon =

Fictional character

- A Song of Ice and Fire character House of the Dragon character
- Harry Collett as Jace Velaryon during the second season of House of the Dragon
- First appearance: Literature: The Princess and the Queen (2013); Television: "The Princess and the Queen" (2022)
- Last appearance: Television: "Rhaenyra Triumphant" (2026)
- Created by: George R. R. Martin
- Adapted by: Ryan Condal and George R. R. Martin (for House of the Dragon)
- Portrayed by: Harry Collett; Leo Hart (child)

In-universe information
- Gender: Male
- Titles: Prince; Crown Prince (disputed); Prince of Dragonstone (Note: Only within the canon of the A Song of Ice and Fire novels/novellas.)
- Affiliation: The Blacks
- Family: House Targaryen; House Velaryon; House Stark (by marriage; possibly); House Strong (Note: Only within the canon of House of the Dragon TV series.)
- Significant others: Baela Targaryen (betrothed); Sara Snow (possible lover/wife)
- Relatives: Rhaenyra Targaryen (mother); Laenor Velaryon (legal father); Harwin Strong (rumoured/biological father); Lucerys Velaryon (brother); Joffrey Velaryon (brother); Aegon III Targaryen (half-brother); Viserys II Targaryen (half-brother); Visenya Targaryen (half-sister); Addam Velaryon (legal half-brother); Alyn Velaryon (legal half-brother)

Jacaerys "Jace" Velaryon is a fictional character from American author George R. R. Martin's the A Song of Ice and Fire series of epic fantasy novels, appearing in the 2013 novella The Princess and the Queen, the 2014 novella The Rogue Prince and the 2018 book Fire & Blood. In the HBO television adaptation, House of the Dragon, he is primarily portrayed by British actor Harry Collett, and by Leo Hart as a child.

Jace is the firstborn son of Rhaenyra Targaryen, and older brother to Lucerys and Joffrey Velaryon, as well as half-brother to Aegon, Viserys and Visenya. Jace and his full-brothers are acknowledged by Rhaenyra's first husband Laenor Velaryon as his sons, but they are subjects to rumors circulating at the royal court that their biological father is Rhaenyra's paramour, Ser Harwin Strong. As a member of the ruling House Targaryen, Jace had the innate ability to bond with a dragon, and rode the dragon Vermax.

Jacaerys' mother Rhaenyra, through a series of unprecedented circumstances, was named heir apparent to the Iron Throne of Westeros, only to have her claim challenged and usurped by her half-brother (Jace's uncle) Aegon, leading to a war of succession between those supporting Rhaenyra (known as "the Blacks") and those supporting Aegon (known as "the Greens"). During the civil war, known as the Dance of the Dragons due to both sides deploying dragonriders, Jace supports his mother's claim and acts as a member of her council, and is instrumental in the Blacks winning over the decisive alliance from the Vale and the North. He is later killed in combat along with his dragon while providing air support during a naval battle.

== In the books ==
Jacaerys was born in 114 AC (years after Aegon's conquest) to then-Crown Princess Rhaenyra Targaryen. Rhaenyra's husband Laenor Velaryon, who is also her second cousin and thought by many to be more fond of men than women, wanted to name the child "Joffrey" after his late friend and secret lover Ser Joffrey Lonmouth, but his father Lord Corlys Velaryon overrules him and the child is instead given a "traditional Velaryon name". By royal decree, Jacaerys and his younger brothers Lucerys and Joffrey are presented with dragon eggs, with Jacaerys naming his hatchling Vermax. Unlike most memebers of Targaryen and Velaryon families (who have silver or golden hair and purple eyes, so-called "Valyrian" traits), Jacaerys and his full-brothers had dark hair and dark eyes. While the young princes might have inherited their features after non-Valyrian ancestors (found in both Rhaenyra's and Laenor's family trees), their unusual look led to rumors that their true father was not Laenor, but Ser Harwin Strong, the heir to Harrenhal and a sworn shield of Princess Rhaenyra. Jacaerys grew into a "handsome teenager" who is further described as "bold", "responsible", and "politically savvy" despite his relative young age.

When Jacaerys is four years old, Rhaenyra betroths him to his second cousin Baela Targaryen, the daughter of his great-uncle Daemon Targaryen with his aunt Laena Velaryon (Laenor's sister), the latter of whom died during an obstructed labor two years later. After Laenor's death, the newly widowed Rhaenyra marries the also-widowed Daemon, and they have two more sons Aegon (the Younger) and Viserys, who as pure-blooded Targaryens have the Valyrian white hair and purple eyes, unlike their Velaryon half-brothers. Since a very young age, the three Velaryon brothers became bitter rivals with their half-uncles Aegon (the Elder), Aemond and Daeron Targaryen who were born to Queen Alicent Hightower, the second wife of King Viserys (Jacaerys' grandfather), and thus can potentially challenge Rhaenyra's claim to the Iron Throne. Alicent's parental family, House Hightower of Old Town, are also a wealthy and ambitious clan who want to seize control of royal politics, so Alicent's children also resent the Velaryon boys (whom they have mocked as "Strong boys") for obstructing their claim to the Iron Throne. Aware of this threat, Jacaerys has served as a squire in order to become more skilled in combat, presumably under his stepfather Daemon. Harwin has also trained the Velaryon brothers before he and his father died in a suspicious fire at Harrenhal, leading to his pro-Hightower younger brother Larys to inherit the Strong lordship.

When Jacaerys is fourteen, his grandfather King Viserys dies and House Hightower, in collaboration with Ser Criston Cole of the Kingsguard and other conspirators, exploit the opportunity to install Aegon the Elder (who is initially unwilling) to the throne as King Aegon II, thus usurping Rhaenyra's legal birthright as Viserys' chosen successor. This leads to Rhaenyra, who is away from the capital King's Landing due to pregnancy, and gives birth prematurely to a stillborn daughter upon hearing the news. Compounding anger with the grief of losing a child, Rhaenyra crowns herself as the rightful Queen of Westeros, and a war of succession breaks out between her supporters, also known as "the Blacks" after the sigil color favored by the Targaryens; and those supporting Aegon and House Hightower, known as "the Greens" after the sigil color of the Hightowers. Because both factions have dragonriders, this Targaryen civil war is also known as the "Dance of the Dragons". At her coronation, Rhaenyra formally names Jacaerys as the Prince of Dragonstone and her heir to the Iron Throne.

The war initially starts with a diplomacy contest, with both sides trying to win over allegiances of various great noble houses via letters of lobbying and bargaining. As young adults and the only ones among Rhaenyra's children who are old enough to handle affairs, Jacaerys and Lucerys volunteer to be her envoys, arguing that they can travel much faster flying on dragonback and their status as princes persuades better in person, and she allows them on the condition that they avoid engaging in any battles. Jacaerys is given the more strenuous mission of visiting and winning over the Vale and the North to the Blacks, which he completes very successfully and personally securing a Pact of Ice and Fire with Lord Cregan Stark. It is also rumored that Jacaerys falls in love with and secretly marries Cregan's bastard half-sister Sara Snow while in Winterfell, although Archmaester Gyldayn (who recorded the war's history) disputes and dismisses the tale as "fevered imaginings".

Jacaerys returns from his northern diplomatic mission only to find that his brother Lucerys was murdered during the southern envoy to the Stormlands and his grandmother (Corlys' wife) Rhaenys Targaryen was also killed in combat at Rook's Rest, both at the hands of Aemond riding Vhagar, the largest and most formidable dragon at the time. Due to Rhaenys' death, Corlys becomes estranged from Rhaenyra, but Jacaerys reconciles them by having Corlys named as Hand of the Queen, and he takes over the mantle of the Blacks' command. As the war intensifies, the Blacks are at an disadvantage due to having already lost two dragons and their riders, Daemon being away at Harrenhal to rally support from the Riverlands, and Rhaenyra being too valuable and also too traumatized with grief to participate in combat. With only himself and his betrothed Baela remaining and capable of fighting, and neither of their dragons big enough to challenge Vhagar, Jacaerys proposes the "Sowing of the Seeds", drafting anyone believed to potentially have Targaryen blood to attempt bonding with the unclaimed dragons at Dragonstone. This results in the recruitment of four lowborn dragonriders that significantly boosts the Black's aerial battle power, who are collectively known as "dragonseeds" or simply "the Seeds":

- Addam of Hull, a shipwright who bonded with Seasmoke, the dragon of the late Laenor Velaryon. Addam and his brother Alyn are allegedly Laenor's bastards, but many suspect them to be actually fathered by Corlys;
- Hugh Hammer, a blacksmith who bonded with Vermithor, the dragon of the late King Jaehaerys Targaryen (Rhaenyra's great-grandfather) and the largest dragon beside Vhagar;
- Ulf White, a man-at-arms who bonded with Silverwing, the dragon of the late Queen Alysanne Targaryen (Rhaenyra's great-grandmother), and;
- Nettles, a homeless thief girl who bonded with an untamed wild dragon on Dragonstone nicknamed "Sheepstealer".

To protect the safety of his remaining brothers, Jacaerys also arranges for them to be sent away from Dragonstone, with Joffrey being sent to Gulltown accompanied by Rhaena Targaryen (Baela's twin sister), and Aegon the Younger and Viserys to Pentos. However, the ship convoy carrying Aegon and Viserys to Pentos encounters the massive Triarchy mercenary fleet, who are hired by the Greens to break the Velaryon sea blockade. The two princes' ship is attacked and sacked with Viserys lost at sea and presumed dead (in reality, he is captured and sent to Lys as a hostage), and only Aegon manages to escape atop his young dragon Stormcloud, which died of injuries upon returning to Dragonstone. Upon hearing about the incoming enemy fleet, Jacaerys leads the four new dragonriders into combat at the ensuing Battle of the Gullet. The five Blacks dragons lay waste to the Triarchy fleet, but Vermax is wounded during the fight and is pulled down by a grapnel harpoon from a sinking galley. Jacaerys is able to free himself from his drowning dragon, but is shot and killed by crossbow bolts and sinks into the sea.

Jacaerys' death is a huge blow to the Blacks, as Rhaenyra is further distraught by his death and so consumed with vengeful rage that she can no longer judge soundly. She later falls out again with Corlys and imprisons him, causing the remaining Velaryon fleet to abandon their blockade. Without Jacaerys leading and overseeing the recruited dragonriders, Hugh Hammer and Ulf White later betray their post and defect to the Greens, leading to the Blacks' devastating loss at Tumbleton. However, Jacaerys' prior efforts in winning over northern allies eventually pays off for the Blacks. The Winter Wolves led by Lord Roderick Dustin, a vanguard of 2,000 elderly Northmen hastily sent by Cregan Stark as the North is preoccupied with harvest and not yet ready for a full mobilization, proves crucial in turning the tides of land battles for the Blacks following a series of previous setbacks. Later even after Rhaenyra's capture and execution by Aegon II, Cregan still honors his friendship and promise to Jacaerys by personally marching 20,000 troops south in support of Rhaenyra's then-only known surviving son Aegon, who is a prisoner of war and hostage under the Greens. This new northern Blacks army, along with fresh reinforcements from the Vale, are instrumental in coercing the Greens' eventual unconditional surrender and Aegon II's poisoning assassination by his own Greens supporters. Cregan also serves a brief unpaid tenure as the Hand of the King (known as the "Hour of the Wolf") to ensure the ascension of Jacaerys' half-brother as King Aegon III, with his bannerman Torrhen Manderly staying as the regent until Aegon III comes of age.

== Television adaptation ==
=== Casting and development ===
Because the show covers such an extensive amount of time, producers had to cast multiple actors for some of the same roles, with the child characters aging up following a time jump midway through the first season. On March 30, 2022, HBO announced that Harry Collett was cast as Jacaerys, who Leo Hart portraying a younger version of the character. Hart appears as Jace in two episodes of the show's first season, with Collett assuming the role from the eighth episode "The Lord of the Tides" onwards. Collett first auditioned for the show in 2020 when he was seventeen but was not originally made aware that the show was due to HBO changing the names of the characters and locations. Due to his age, Collett had not seen Game of Thrones, but was aware of the show. Of his audition, Collett explained, "it was a scene with Rhaenyra and Lucerys, but they [replaced Rhaenyra with Lucerys’ brother, Collett’s character Jacaerys] and they were called Jack and Luke. We were in a living room and I was telling Luke how he shouldn’t feel upset about something". He described feeling as though his audition went well, but that he was unlikely to get the part after seeing how physically different a lot of the other actors in the waiting room were from him.

Jace is described as "a handsome and good-natured young man" who is fiercely loyal to his mother and her cause who is willing to do whatever it takes to defend his family and secure their claim for the Iron Throne, with the goal of becoming a "successful, respected ruler" upon his coronation. His Targaryen blood is important to him due to insecurities around the true identity of his father and he wants to "continue his mother's family legacy" by taking her surname when he becomes king. Of his character, Collett stated, "Jace is so dynamic, and he's such a good leader", and that he enjoyed all the scenes with Emma D'Arcy, who plays his mother Rhaenyra because their close dynamic was a unique contrast to some of the other characters in the show who have more fractured relationships with their parents.

Discussing Jace's political acumen, showrunner Ryan Condal highlighted the scenes with Cregan Stark in "A Son for a Son" as critical to establishing him as a capable diplomat, a role he continues to play for Rhaenyra as the season continues.

Speaking on Jace's decision to defy Rhaenyra in season three, Collett stated, "she has been fighting so hard to keep me at home and keep me safe because she knows that I'm the heir. Now, he's playing the 'I don't want to listen to mum. I'm gonna be my own man now,' which is completely fair enough because 16 in the Game of Thrones world is probably 30-odd." Collett was aware of Jace's fate when he initially signed onto the show in season one, and described it as "the perfect death", noting that there was "no way Jace couldn't have died" once he'd made up his mind to ride into battle despite his inexperience. Collett stated that Jace felt "young and vulnerable" once he was separated from Vermax and the first arrow hit him, and that he believes that Jace's final thoughts would be him regretting his decision to go and wishing his mother Rhaenyra was with him.

Collett is credited with the main cast from his first appearance in "The Lord of the Tides" to "Queen's Landing". He is credited as a guest star for his appearance as a hallucination in "Rhaenyra Triumphant". Leo Hart is credited with the guest cast in both of his appearances in season one.

=== Season 1 ===
Following her marriage to Laenor Velaryon, Princess Rhaenyra Targaryen gives birth to Jacaerys, her first child. With his birth, Jace becomes second-in-line to inherit the Iron Throne after his mother and, per an agreement made between his maternal grandfather King Viserys Targaryen and paternal grandfather Corlys Velaryon, he is expected to take the former's surname upon his ascension. Although Jace, and later his two younger brothers Lucerys ("Luke") and Joffrey, are presented as legitimate children of Laenor, they are actually bastards fathered by Ser Harwin Strong, Rhaenyra's lover. Viserys' wife Alicent Hightower is suspicious of the true parentage of Rhaenyra's children and, in order to ease tensions, Rhaenyra proposes that Jace be betrothed to Alicent's daughter Helaena, though Alicent refuses. As rumours continue to spread, Viserys sends Strong away and, following an emotional goodbye to Rhaenyra and her children, Jace asks his mother whether Strong is his real father. Rhaenyra does not definitively answer, telling him that the only thing that matters is that he is a Targaryen. During childhood, Jace bonds with the green dragon Vermax, becoming his rider.

Six years later, when Corlys is severely wounded in battle with pirates, his brother Vaemond petitions the crown to be named as Corlys' heir, alleging that Luke, the current heir to Driftmark, is not legitimate. In attempt to gain the support of Corlys' wife Rhaenys in defending Luke's claim, Rhaenyra proposes that Jace be betrothed to Rhaenys' granddaughter Baela. Following Viserys' death, Aegon, his son with Alicent, usurps the throne from Rhaenyra, igniting a war of succession between the Blacks (Rhaenyra's supporters) and the Greens (Alicent's faction supporting Aegon). Jace and the rest of his family base themselves at Dragonstone. Needing to secure the loyalty of the other Houses of Westeros, Rhaenyra sends Jace and Luke out on dragonback as her envoys to recruit allies.

=== Season 2 ===
Jace travels to the Vale of Arryn and secures the support of House Arryn before flying north to the Wall, where he speaks with Lord Cregan Stark and successfully persuades him to pledge his men to Rhaenyra's cause, though their meeting is interrupted when a raven arrives informing Jace that Luke was killed by Aemond Targaryen and his dragon Vhagar. Jace rushes home and attempts to give a report to Rhaenyra before the two break down in each other's arms, and subsequently attend Luke's funeral. When consoling Baela over her troubles with her father Daemon, Jace speaks positively about being raised by Laenor and his mixed feelings on Harwin.

As the war intensifies, Ser Criston Cole and his forces plan to assault Rook's Rest, a Black stronghold, and claim it for the Greens. Jace proposes that he be sent on Vermax to protect the town, hoping to secure his and his mother's claim to the throne, but Rhaenyra refuses due to his lack of experience and instead shares with him "the Song of Ice and Fire" which is passed down through the monarchs of Westeros. Expressing his frustrations to Baela and wanting to be useful, Jace goes to the Twins to meet with House Frey and obtains their loyalty without Rhaenyra's knowledge. Initially enraged by his disobedience, Rhaenyra praises his success and requests his counsel on how they can deal with Vhagar. Jace proposes that potential dragonriders may be found in other noble families due to earlier Targaryens marrying into them, and suggests that they should look for them and see if any of them can successfully bond with the large dragons living below Dragonstone. When Jace's idea proves fruitful, Mysaria proposes that Rhaenyra widen her search for dragonriders to include lowborn people from King's Landing, which enrages Jace. He confronts his mother, telling her that he is afraid this will undermine his legitimacy as her heir due to the lowborn having traditional Targaryen features such as white hair while he resembles Harwin Strong. Rhaenyra tries to explain herself, but he angrily replies that he is not a fool, everyone now knows that he is a bastard, yet he can face this and succeed him because, as proof of his Targaryen blood, he has a dragon, and he accuses his mother of wanting to deprive him of that too, noting that his claim is diluted if any commoner can have a dragon. He later clashes with the successful dragonriders Hugh and Ulf. Baela comforts him and advises him to prove himself by standing at his mother's side rather than allowing his insecurities to overpower him.

=== Season 3 ===
When Rhaenyra returns from a clandestine meeting with Alicent and informs her Council that she has struck a deal that will allow the Blacks to claim King's Landing with minimal bloodshed, Jace is suspicious and warns her that Alicent cannot be trusted and plans to lure them into a trap. Despite his concerns being echoed by her other advisors, Rhaenyra affirms her faith in Alicent and instructs her men to prepare to take the city in two days.

Baela alerts the Black Council that there is war in the Gullet, and Rhaenyra announces her plan to personally assist Corly's ships on her dragon Syrax. Fearing his mother's safety and wanting to prove himself after feeling frustrated that she has placed her trust in Alicent over him, Jace orders Rhaenyra's guard Ser Lorent to lock her in her room and convinces Baela to go with him to the Battle of the Gullet. Jace and Baela provide support to the Velayron fleet on their dragons Vermax and Moondancer, significantly aiding them in the battle. Sharako Lohar briefly ensnares Vermax by firing a harpoon tethered to a heavy weight, but Moondancer helps it break free. Flying back to Dragonstone on the wild dragon Sheepstealer, Rhaena sees the battle from afar and decides to help, but she is unable to control the untrained dragon, who begins burning ships indiscriminately. Sheepstealer then begins attacking Moondancer, causing Jace and Vermax to pursue. Realizing that Rhaena is riding, Jace is forced to abort an attack on Sheepstealer, and Vermax ends up flying so low that it is hit by a second harpoon and dragged down. Jace frees himself as Vermax drowns and swims to the surface, only to be shot three times and killed by Triarchy archers while clinging to a piece of driftwood. His body is later recovered by Baela as other dragonriders arrive in reinforcement, and presented back to the deeply distraught Rhaenyra. The news of Jace's death is also relayed to Daemon, prompting him to break from his Riverlands campaign and return to personally aid Rhaenyra capturing King's Landing, with Rhaenyra carrying Jace's sword. Unable to process her grief once she has taken the throne, Rhaenyra begins to hallucinate Jace in the halls of the Red Keep and avoids spending time with Joffrey, her eldest surviving son and heir.

== Reception ==
Harry Collett's performance as Jacaerys Velaryon has been praised by critics. Reviewers praised the scenes of grief between Rhaenyra and Jace in "A Son for a Son", where they emotionally reunite following the death of Lucerys, with Katie Doll of CBR writing, "both D'Arcy and Collett are monumental examples of actors who impress in their breakout roles." James Hunt of Screen Rant referred to him as the "emotional core" of the season two episode "The Red Sowing", and lauded his scenes with Emma D'Arcy, writing, "a lot of praise must also go to Harry Collett, who gives his best performance yet as Jace: the scene where he talks about being Harwin Strong's son is powerful and devastating." Daniel Roman of Winter is Coming called the scenes in "Salt and Sea, Fire and Blood" where Jace convinces Ser Lorent to lock up Rhaenyra and his later conversation with Baela as "Harry Collett's two best scenes of the entire series".

Following the airing of their season two scene together, fans began shipping Jace and Cregan Stark's bromance in memes, edits and fanfiction. Tom Taylor, who plays Cregan, joked, "'Brokeback Winterfell.' I've seen that one going around, I think it's brilliant. Fans, they're going crazy with stuff. I think it's so cool that people are so passionate and want to get involved. I saw a video the other day where they stuck my head and Harry's head on these guys dancing, some AI dancing and stuff. It was ridiculous, but it was so funny." Collett later also commented on the phenomenon at the season three premiere stating, "I get shipped with Cregan Stark a lot which I find quite funny, and me and Tom laugh about that. I think the thing is called 'Brokeback Winterfell' or something."
