= Tammara Webber =

American novelist

Tammara Webber is an American New York Times, USA Today, and Amazon bestselling novelist.

== Writing career ==
In 2011, Webber self-published the first book of her young adult romance series Between the Lines which has also been republished by Penguin/Razorbill UK Publishing.

Webber's new-adult fiction title Easy was released on eBook and paperback in June 2012 then republished through Penguin/Razorbill UK Publishing and Penguin/Berkley US Publishing in September 2012 and October 2012, respectively. As of today, Easy has a total of 24 separate foreign translation contracts.

Webber's new-adult fiction novel titled Breakable, a half alternate point of view and half prequel to her best selling novel Easy, was released in May 2014 and made the New York Times and USA Today Best Seller lists.

== Bibliography ==
=== Contours of the Heart (series) ===
1. Easy (2012)
2. Breakable (prequel - 2014)
3. Sweet (2015)
4. Brave (2017)

=== Between the Lines (series) ===
1. Between the Lines (2011)
2. Where You Are (2011)
3. Good For You (2011)
4. Here Without You (2013)
