= Clare Kilner =

English film director

- Occupation: Director
- Years active: 1993–present

Clare Kilner is an English film and television director.

In film, she is best known for directing How to Deal (2003) and The Wedding Date (2005). On television, Kilner has directed episodes of Eastenders and House of the Dragon. For the latter, she directed the episodes King of the Narrow Sea, We Light the Way, The Green Council, Rhaenyra the Cruel, Queen's Landing and Rhaenyra Triumphant, all of which were critically acclaimed.

== Filmography ==
=== Films ===
Year	Title	Notes
1993	Saplings	Short Film
1994	Half Day	Short Film
1994	The Secret	Short Film; also writer
1995	Symbiosis	Short Film
1997	Daphne & Apollo	Short Film
1999	Janice Beard	Also writer
2003	How to Deal	
2004	Something Borrowed	
2005	The Wedding Date	
2009	American Virgin	Independent Film
2011	Child P.O.W.	Independent Film
2019	Wonder Park	Uncredited

=== TV ===
Year	Title	Notes
1997–1998	EastEnders	5 episodes
2015	The Middle	1 episode: "A Quarry Story"
2016–2018	Delicious	4 episodes
2017	Good Behavior	1 episode: "Because I'm Mrs. Claus"
2018–2019	Claws	2 episodes
2019	Pennyworth	1 episode: "Julie Christie"
2019	Krypton	1 episode: "Mercy"
2019	Trinkets	2 episodes
2019	Sneaky Pete	2 episodes
2020	The Alienist	3 episodes
2021	The Mosquito Coast	1 episode: "The Glass Sandwich"
2021	Debris	1 episode: "Spaceman"
2021	Snowpiercer	2 episodes
2022–2026	House of the Dragon	8 episodes; also co-executive producer
2023	Gen V	1 episode: "Welcome to the Monster Club"
2024	Fallout	2 episodes
2026	Man on Fire	2 episodes
