= Harry Collett =

British actor (born 2004)

- Harry Collett for Man About Town, 2026.
- Born: 17 January 2004 (age 22); Havering, London, England
- Occupation: Actor
- Years active: 2009–present

Harry Collett (born 17 January 2004) is an English actor. He began his career as a child actor in the West End. He went on to play Oliver Hide in the BBC medical drama Casualty (2016–2022), Tommy Stubbins in the film Dolittle (2020), and Prince Jacaerys Velaryon in the HBO fantasy series House of the Dragon (2022–2026).

== Early life ==
From Havering in London, Collett attended Coopers' Company and Coborn School for his secondary education, completing Year 11 in 2020.

== Career ==
Collett began his career in the West End productions of Billy Elliot the Musical at the Victoria Palace Theatre as Small Boy, Matilda The Musical at the Cambridge Theatre as Eric, and Elf at the Dominion Theatre as Michael.

Collett made his television debut in a 2014 episode of BBC medical drama Casualty as Seb Durante. That same year, he played a younger version of Michael Bublé in the music video for Bublé and Idina Menzel's cover of "Baby, It's Cold Outside". The following year, Collett made a guest appearance in the ABC musical comedy series Galavant as a younger version of the titular character (played by Joshua Sasse). He voiced lead character Wally in Wallykazam! across the first two series on the Nick Jr. Channel and Buzzbee in The Hive on CITV.

In 2016, Collett was cast in another guest role on Casualty as Oliver Hide, the son of established character David Hide (Jason Durr) and debuted during the fifth episode of series 31. As part of the appearance, Collett filmed a stunt featuring his character trapped in a car engulfed in flames. He reprised the role in 2017 for three episodes, and again in 2019 for a longer stint. The actor returned for another stint in 2021. The following year in series 36, Collett reprised the role for four episodes, concluding with his character's death during a school shooting in episode thirty nine. Collett's co-star Durr praised the actor, calling him "absolutely fantastic", further remarking, "He's got a great career ahead of him".

Collett made his film debut voicing a younger version of Luke Treadaway's character Raymond Briggs in Ethel & Ernest, an animated biographical film released in 2016. In 2017, Collett appeared in the short film Honour as 11-year-old boy Lee and had a cameo in Christopher Nolan's war film Dunkirk. The following year, he appeared in Dead in a Week or Your Money Back as a younger version of the character William.

In December 2017, it was announced Collett would star as apprentice Tommy Stubbins alongside Robert Downey Jr. in the adventure comedy film Dolittle, which would be released in January 2020. Collett was then cast as Prince Jacaerys "Jace" Velaryon in the 2022 HBO fantasy series House of the Dragon, a Game of Thrones prequel and adaptation of part of George R. R. Martin's companion book Fire & Blood.

In July 2025, Collett was announced in the lead role opposite Lizzy Greene in the movie adaptation of the new adult novel Easy by Tammara Webber.

== Filmography ==
†	Denotes works that have not yet been released

Film roles
Year	Title	Role	Notes
2016	Ethel & Ernest	Young Raymond Briggs	Voice role
2017	Dunkirk	Boy	
2018	Dead in a Week or Your Money Back	Young William	
2020	Dolittle	Tommy Stubbins	
2025	Easy †	Lukas Maxfield	Adaptation of the novel of the same name by Tammara Webber

Television roles
Year	Title	Role	Notes
2014	Casualty	Seb Durante	Episode: "A Life Less Lived"
2015	Galavant	Young Galavant	Episode: "My Cousin Izzy"
2015	The Hive	Buzzbee	Voice role, 5 episodes
2016−2022	Casualty	Oliver Hide	Recurring role, 23 episodes
2022−2026	House of the Dragon	Jacaerys Velaryon	Main role; 13 episodes

Music video roles
Year	Title	Artist	Notes
2014	"Baby, It's Cold Outside"	Idina Menzel and Michael Bublé	

Video game roles
Year	Title	Role	Notes
2015	Dragon Quest Heroes: The World Tree's Woe and the Blight Below	Helix	English version

== Stage ==
Stage roles
Year	Title	Role	Notes
2010	Billy Elliot the Musical	Small Boy	Victoria Palace Theatre, London
2013	Matilda The Musical	Eric	Cambridge Theatre, London
2015−2016	Elf	Michael	Dominion Theatre, London
