= Phoebe Campbell =

English actor

- Born: 1997 or 1998 (age 28–29); England
- Education: Royal Academy of Dramatic Art (BA)
- Occupation: Actor
- Years active: 2016–present

Phoebe Campbell is an English actor known for portraying Rhaena Targaryen in the HBO fantasy series House of the Dragon. Campbell's previous work includes a role on the British TV show Midsomer Murders and the role of Cecily Cardew in a 2022 production of The Importance of Being Earnest.

== Personal life and education ==
Phoebe Campbell was born in England. They are nonbinary. They are dating Hannah van der Westhuysen since 2022.

They are a graduate of James Allen's Girls' School in Dulwich. In 2022, Campbell graduated from the Royal Academy of Dramatic Art (RADA) with a Bachelor's of Art in Acting. During their time at RADA, Campbell took part in various university-run theatrical productions, including Hamlet, Antigone and opera Our Man in Havana.

== Career ==
They made their acting debut in 2016, portraying various roles, including Petra in the BBC Television show Home From Home and Tara in the ITV series Midsomer Murders. In 2017, they played the role of Jenny in the award-winning short film Heart's Ease, which was produced by Jassa Ahluwalia.

Campbell has been cast in the television role of Rhaena Targaryen in the 2022 award-winning HBO fantasy series House of the Dragon, a Game of Thrones prequel and adaptation of George R. R. Martin's companion book Fire and Blood. Campbell was nominated alongside the rest of the cast for the Best Ensemble in a Drama Series category in the 2022 Pena de Prata awards. They returned to the role for second and third seasons.

Campbell made their theatrical debut in 2022, in an English Touring Theatre all-black production of The Importance of Being Earnest as Cecily Cardew, alongside actress Adele James. Their performance was praised, called "effervescently bouncy" and garnering a "huge laugh" by the Evening Standard, and called "flawless" by Theatre Weekly. Campbell won the Best Non Binary Performer in a Play at the 2023 Black British Theatre Awards for their performance as Cecily. They then went on to play the character of Susanna in Hamnet, which was adapted for stage by Lolita Chakrabarti from the book of the same name. In 2024, they then took on the role of Nikki in Kendall Feaver's play Alma Mater.

In 2024, Campbell was member of the jury for the Dinard British and Irish Film Festival. From January 2026, Campbell will take on the role of Carol Penn in a National Theatre production of Man and Boy.

Campbell's character in House of the Dragon, Rhaena Targaryen, drew attention and controversy in the show's second and third seasons when it was revealed that the character's storyline was merged with that of another key character from the book series. Campbell's performance in this new storyline has received praise.

== Filmography ==
†	Denotes works that have not yet been released

Film roles
Year	Title	Role	Notes
2016	The Last Dragonslayer	Girl at Stuffco	Adaptation of the book by the same name
2018	Heart's Ease	Jenny	Short Film
2023	Twofold	Allie	Short Film

Television roles
Year	Title	Role	Notes
2016	Home from Home	Petra	Episode: "Pilot"
2017	Midsomer Murders	Tara Lockson	Episode: "Crime and Punishment"
2022–present	House of the Dragon	Rhaena Targaryen	Main role; 13 episodes

== Theatre ==
Stage roles
Year	Title	Role	Notes
2022	The Importance of Being Earnest	Cecily Cardew	English Touring Theatre
2023–2024	Hamnet	Susanna	Garrick Theatre
2024	Alma Mater	Nikki	Almeida Theatre
2026	Man and Boy †	Carol Penn	Dorfman Theatre
