= Daemon Targaryen =

Fictional character

- A Song of Ice and Fire character House of the Dragon character
- Matt Smith as Daemon Targaryen in the third season of House of the Dragon
- First appearance: Literature: The Princess and the Queen (2013); Television: "The Heirs of the Dragon" (2022)
- Created by: George R. R. Martin
- Adapted by: Ryan Condal and George R. R. Martin (for House of the Dragon)
- Portrayed by: Matt Smith

In-universe information
- Aliases: The Rogue Prince; Lord of Flea Bottom; Prince of the City
- Gender: Male
- Titles: Prince; Ser; Master of Coin; Master of Laws; Commander of the City Watch; King of the Stepstones and the Narrow Sea; Protector of the Realm (Note: Only within the canon of the A Song of Ice and Fire novels/novellas.); King consort (Note: Only within the canon of the House of the Dragon television series.)
- Affiliation: The Blacks
- Family: House Targaryen
- Spouses: Rhea Royce (unconsummated); Leana Velaryon; Rhaenyra Targaryen (niece)
- Significant others: Mysaria; Nettles (rumored)
- Children: with Laena Velaryon: Baela Targaryen; Rhaena Targaryen; Unnamed son/Unborn child; with Rhaenyra Targaryen: Aegon III Targaryen; Viserys II Targaryen; Visenya Targaryen (stillborn)
- Relatives: Baelon Targaryen (father); Alyssa Targaryen (mother); Viserys I Targaryen (brother); Aegon Targaryen (brother)

Daemon Targaryen, nicknamed The Rogue Prince, is a fictional character in American author George R. R. Martin's the A Song of Ice and Fire series of epic fantasy novels, appearing in the 2013 novella The Princess and the Queen, the 2014 novella The Rogue Prince and the 2018 book Fire & Blood. In the HBO television adaptation House of the Dragon, he is portrayed by English actor Matt Smith.

A central figure in the Westerosi succession war known as the Dance of the Dragons, Daemon is a prince of the ruling Targaryen dynasty. He is the younger brother of King Viserys I Targaryen, uncle and second husband of Queen Rhaenyra Targaryen, and father to Baela, Rhaena, Aegon III, and Viserys II Targaryen respectively. Considered one of the most formidable warriors of his time, Daemon rides the fearsome red dragon Caraxes and wields the Valyrian steel blade Dark Sister. He served as Commander of the City Watch during Viserys' reign in King's Landing, along with brief stints in the small council as Master of Coin and Master of Laws. After leaving King's Landing, he led a successful war effort with House Velaryon in the Stepstones, styling himself King of the Stepstones and the Narrow Sea. Long after returning to court, Daemon became a prominent supporter of his niece and wife Rhaenrya's claim to the Iron Throne as the proclaimed heir of Viserys, following the installation of her half-brother (Viserys' eldest son) Aegon II to the throne as orchestrated by the "Green Council" faction after Viserys' passing.

Smith's performance as Daemon has received widespread critical acclaim, as he was nominated in supporting actor categories at the Critics' Choice Awards and Astra Awards in 2023, and for the Saturn Awards in 2024 and 2025.

== In the books ==
In 81 AC, Daemon was born as the second son of Prince Baelon Targaryen and his sister-wife Princess Alyssa Targaryen. Shortly after his birth, Alyssa took Daemon riding on her dragon Meleys, just as she had done with his elder brother Viserys. Alyssa would perish in 84 AC after a difficult labor in delivering her third son Aegon, who passed away half a year later in infancy. As a boy, Daemon was described by Archmaester Gyldayn as "ambitious, impetuous, moody" and "charming as he was hot-tempered". At 16, he was knighted by his grandfather King Jaehaerys I Targaryen, and given the Valyrian steel sword Dark Sister for his combat prowess.

Around the same time in 97 AC, Daemon was married to Lady Rhea Royce, whom he disliked and referred to as a "bronze bitch". At an unknown point of time, Daemon claimed the lean, fierce dragon Caraxes as his mount.

During the Great Council of 101 AC, Daemon supported Viserys' claim to the Iron Throne, with the intention of being declared future heir to the throne as his younger brother. The council chose Viserys to be the next king in Westeros, and he ascended the throne in 103 AC following Jaehaerys' death. In the tourney celebrating Viserys' accession, Daemon was defeated twice by the knight Ser Criston Cole, in rounds of melee and joust. Viserys appointed Daemon as his Master of Coin briefly from 103-104 AC, then as Master of Laws for six months in 104, during which Daemon became a fierce rival to the Hand of the King, Ser Otto Hightower.

Bored of governance on the small council, Daemon was appointed by Viserys as Commander of the City Watch, a position which better suited his warrior personality. As commander, Daemon provided his watchmen with dirks, short swords and cudgels, and gave each of them a golden cloak to "wear with pride", leading to men of the City Watch being known as "gold cloaks". He regularly raided the alleys of King's Landing with his men, where he routinely delighted in brutal punishments to rapists, thieves, and pickpockets, setting a more fearsome reputation for the City Watch as crime rates dropped significantly. City watchmen were deeply loyal to Daemon, who became well-known in the city slums where he frequented brothels, gambling pits, and wine sinks. During his time as "Prince of the City" and "Lord Flea Bottom", Daemon became enamored with the Lysene dancing girl Mysaria, referred to as the "White Worm" by her enemies.

Daemon considered himself as the rightful heir to the Iron Throne after his brother, as Viserys had no living male sons to proclaim as his heir. The prospect of Daemon ascending the throne was staunchly opposed by Otto, who instead proposed that Viserys name his daughter Rhaenyra as his successor, a decision that would alter the Great Council's precedent of the king's eldest son being the true heir. Viserys did not immediately address the issue of succession, instead opting to wait until a future son was born to him and his wife, Queen Aemma Arryn. Tragically, Aemma would soon pass away giving birth to her secondborn son Baelon, who survived his mother for a day only. Shortly after the deaths of the queen and prince, Daemon was heard vocalizing drunken jests with other highborns in the Street of Silk, in which he referred to Baelon as the "heir for a day". This rumor enraged Viserys, who held a ceremony where he officially named Rhaenrya as his heir and Princess of Dragonstone, infuriating Daemon into resigning from the City Watch and flying to Dragonstone with Mysaria. Half a year later, Viserys demanded that Daemon return a dragon's egg he had presented to Mysaria after she became pregnant, and to return to his wife Rhea in the Vale, which Daemon angrily complied with under penalties of being labelled a traitor. After Mysaria lost their baby on a ship to Lys, Daemon became hardened against Viserys, referring to him with strong contempt and brooding "day and night on the succession".

In 106 AC, Daemon and Lord Corlys Velaryon of Driftmark (nicknamed the "Sea Snake") joined their forces to lead an invasion of the Stepstones, as the Rogue Prince sought to establish his own kingdom and Corlys desired to end the reign of the Triarchy over the Stepstones. Their alliance was driven by their mutual disapproval of Viserys' union with Lady Alicent Hightower as his new queen, as Viserys had shunned Corlys' daughter Laena, and Alicent's father Otto would obtain greater court power. For the next three years, Daemon fought the Triarchy on dragonback and commanded an army of various adventurers and second sons, while Corlys commanded the Velaryon fleet which engaged in naval warfare with their enemies. Despite their tension, Viserys funded Daemon and Corlys' campaign with gold. Daemon slew Craghas Drahar (known as the "Crabfeeder") with Dark Sister in 108 AC, and had controlled all but two islands in the Stepstones by 109 AC, which influenced Daemon to have Corlys crown him as "King of the Stepstones and the Narrow Sea". Soon after, a counterattack by the Triarchy and their newly acquired Dornish allies proved difficult for Daemon to maintain control over his new kingdom, which along with weariness from governance influenced his decision to return to court in 111 AC.

Daemon arrived in King's Landing during a tourney celebrating the fifth anniversary of Viserys and Alicent's marriage, during which a court rivalry between Rhaenyra's supporters (known as the "blacks") and Alicent's supporters (known as the "greens") originated. Upon arrival, Daemon presented Viserys with his crown from the Stepstones and pledged loyalty to his brother, which was welcomed by Viserys as he offered Daemon a seat on the small council. But despite having spent years away from King's Landing, Daemon's chaotic nature had not changed. He begun operating with the City Watch once again, and visited various brothels on the Street of Silk that he had frequented in his younger years. He developed an unfriendly relationship with Alicent, as her children Prince Aegon the Elder and Prince Aemond Targaryen were Viserys' eldest male sons, which pushed him further down the line of succession.

On the flip side, Daemon spent long hours in company with Princess Rhaenyra, as he told her tales of his pursuits, gifted her with jewelry and other goods, dined and hunted with her, and amused her by mocking the greens at court. The two constantly flew back and forth between King's Landing and Dragonstone, playfully racing each other. But six months following Daemon's return, the prince fell out again with Viserys, who exiled him for reasons disputed by different accounts. Although Grand Maester Runciter claimed it was just a mere quarrel between the brothers, Septon Eustace claimed that Daemon had seduced Rhaenyra and taken her maidenhood on her sixteenth name day, while Mushroom (the court fool) maintained that Daemon had prepared Rhaenyra to seduce and perform sexual practices on her champion Criston Cole, who supposedly denied her advances. After his exile, Daemon returned to his seat at the Stepstones to resume his struggle to maintain his kingdom.

Lady Rhea Royce perished following a fall from a horse in 115 AC, driving Daemon to abandon the Stepstones and fly to the Vale to claim his late wife's seat of Runestone. House Royce refused, instead passing on Runestone to Rhea's nephew. Daemon appealed this decision to the Eyrie, where Lady Jeyne Arryn dismissed his claim and insisted that his presence in the Vale was unwelcome. Rejected, Daemon flew to Driftmark to receive the courtesy of Lord Corlys, during which Lady Laena Velaryon caught his eye with her captivating beauty and charm. Daemon asked Corlys to receive her hand in marriage, but Laena was already betrothed to the son of a sealord of Braavos, who Daemon savagely mocked and slew with Dark Sister in a duel. A fortnight later, Daemon and Laena were married, a union not formally approved by Viserys. It is rumored that their union was arranged by Daemon as a means of rising in the line of succession, as he had many new enemies at court and from his pursuits.

Due to the lack of consent for their marriage from Viserys, Daemon and Laena flew across the Narrow Sea and visited various locations across Essos, such as Pentos, Norvos, Qohor, Volantis, and possibly the ruins of Valyria. In Pentos, Laena gave birth to their twin daughters Baela and Rhaena Targaryen in 116 AC. The four of them arrived in Driftmark half a year later, when Daemon requested permission from Viserys to present his daughters at court, where they would receive the king's royal blessing. Against the wishes of his small council, Viserys granted Daemon's request, believing that his brother becoming a father would change him for the better. Rhaenyra, who was married to Laena's older brother Ser Laenor Velaryon, developed a close relationship with Laena upon her and Daemon's return to court. The three of them often flew together on their dragons Syrax, Caraxes and Vhagar. In 118 AC, Rhaenyra betrothed her two eldest sons Prince Jacaerys “Jace” Velaryon and Prince Lucerys “Luke” Velaryon to Lady Baela and Lady Rhaena respectively, with the blessing of Viserys.

A year later, Rhaenyra traveled to Driftmark to be present at the birth of Daemon and Laena's new issue. Following a grueling labor, Laena gave birth to a "twisted and malformed" son who passed away within an hour, causing Laena great emotional distress and sickness. Though Daemon brought Rhaenyra's personal maester Gerardys from Dragonstone to heal her, Laena perished following three days of delirium in 120 AC, known as "The Year of the Red Spring". In the same year, Laenor was slain by his companion and rumored lover Ser Qarl Correy in Spicetown, a plot which Mushroom claimed was arranged by Daemon, who had supposedly paid Qarl coin to kill Laenor. Furthermore, Septon Eustace surmised that Daemon was the most likely suspect in setting a large fire at Harrenhal, where the Hand Lyonel Strong and his son Ser Harwin Strong (rumored to be the father of Rhaenyra's three sons) burned to death.

Not six months after the deaths of their spouses, Daemon and Rhaenyra married each other suddenly and secretly at Dragonstone. They had two children together: Aegon the Younger in 120 AC, and Viserys II in 122 AC. Aegon's naming caused a further rift between them and Alicent, who interpreted it as a insult to her son Aegon the Elder. In 126 AC, Corlys' brother Ser Vaemond Velaryon accused Rhaenyra's three sons from her previous marriage to Laenor as being bastards fathered by Harwin, in order to prevent Lucerys from inheriting the Sea Snake's titles and holdings following his death. Appalled, Rhaenyra had Daemon take Vaemond and behead him, after which his body was fed to Syrax.

In 129 AC, Viserys passed away in bed at the age of fifty-two, after which the "green council" (made up of Otto, Alicent, Criston and the small council) conspired to crown Aegon the Elder as the next Lord of the Seven Kingdoms, in part due to the council's objections to Daemon as king consort. While Rhaenyra and Daemon were in Dragonstone, the greens held a coronation ceremony at the Dragonpit, where Criston placed Aegon the Conqueror's crown on Aegon the Elder and proclaimed him King Aegon II. In her fury, Rhaenyra gave birth to a stillborn daughter Visenya shortly after, whose death she blamed on the Greens. She called for a "black council" to counter the greens, which included Daemon, their respective children, and a "dozen lesser lords, bannerman, and vassals", the most powerful of which was Lord Corlys and his wife Princess Rhaenys Targaryen (who was skipped over for Viserys in the Great Council of 101 AC). Unlike his previous warrior personality, Daemon suggested for the blacks to "fight this war with words before we go to battle", by forming allegiances with great houses who had not yet declared for Aegon. A day after convening, the blacks held a coronation on Dragonstone, where the crown of Jaehaerys was placed on Rhaenyra's head by Daemon, who named her as "Queen of the Andals, the Rhoynar, and the First Men", while styling himself as Protector of the Realm.

Daemon flew to Harrenhal to establish a base of support for Rhaenyra in the Riverlands, as the castle was the seat of Lord Larys Strong, the master of whisperers at King's Landing. Harrenhal's castellan Ser Simon Strong surrendered to Daemon without resistance, after which Daemon seized their wealth and held Simon and his grandsons as hostages. Following the victory of black-aligned House Blackwood over green-aligned House Bracken at the Battle of the Burning Mill, Daemon led the capture of the Brackens' seat Stone Henge, where the submission of the Brackens effectively secured support among all houses in the Riverlands for Rhaenyra's claim.

After Lucerys was killed by Prince Aemond Targaryen in a dragonfight near Storm's End, Daemon penned a letter to the black council from Harrenhal, which wrote: "An eye for an eye, a son for a son". Daemon instructed Mysaria, his spymaster at King's Landing, to set a plot in motion to avenge the death of Lucerys. For this, she hired "Blood" (a former serjeant of the City Watch) and "Cheese" (a ratcatcher in the Red Keep) to infiltrate the Red Keep. Ultimately, Blood and Cheese brutally murdered Aegon's youngest son Jaehaerys, after forcing his sister-wife Queen Halaena to choose which of their young sons would be killed.

Upon learning that Criston and Aemond marched to Harrenhal with a host of green troops, Daemon abandoned Harrenhal and flew south to King's Landing on Caraxes. Upon arrival in the city, he joined Rhaenyra and the dragonseeds (four dragonriders loyal to the blacks and not of royal titles) in descending to capture the Red Keep. As Alicent mobilized city defenses to defend the city from the blacks, the gold cloaks turned on the greens from loyalty to their former commander Daemon. Current commander Luthor Largent slew Alicent's brother Ser Gwayne Hightower (the second-in-command of the City Watch) after Gwayne called him a turncloak, stating "Daemon gave us these cloaks... and they're gold no matter how you turn them". The city fell in less than a day, and Daemon accompanied Rhaenyra as she sat on the Iron Throne.

As Rhaenyra began her reign in King's Landing, Daemon continued to be her most important adviser within the black council. He was a fierce critic of Corlys' suggestion for potential pardons to great lords and other foes of the blacks in exchange for peace, as they "only sowed the seeds for fresh rebellions". He argued that great houses of the greens should be destroyed and their land redistributed to loyal men, and that the blacks should take the fight to Aemond and his younger brother Prince Daeron, who were both fierce dragonriders. Soon after, Rhaenyra sent Daemon and the dragonseed Nettles to the Trident to search for Aemond and his dragon Vhagar, who were burning castles and villages across the Riverlands.

Daemon and Nettles settled at Maidenpool in their hunt for Aemond, as Lord Manfyrd Mooton feared a potential aerial attack from Vhagar. As they searched the skies day by day, Daemon and Nettles formed a very close bond with each other. Maester Norren maintained that the two ate breakfast and dinner with each other every day, and that Daemon gave her gifts, bathed with her, taught her common courtesy, and gave her gifts. While Norren describes their relationship as fatherly and daughterly, Mushroom claims that their relationship was romantic, and that they shared a bed with each other.

After the betrayal of dragonseeds Ser Hugh Hammer and Ser Ulf White at the First Battle of Tumbleton, Mysaria (now Mistress of Whisperers) fed into the majority of black council's narrative that dragonseeds were untrustworthy and deceitful, as she claimed that Nettles had betrayed Rhaenyra by sharing her bed with Daemon. Furious, Rhaenyra slandered Nettles as a "low creature" using spells to seduce Daemon, believing that Daemon could not be relied upon while he was under her control. Charging her with high treason, she sent a letter to Lord Mooton demanding for him to kill Nettles and return her head to King's Landing, but not to harm Daemon. Torn between disobeying his orders and killing a young girl under guest right, Lord Manfryd opted to pretend he had never received the letter as suggested by Norren, who secretly showed Daemon the letter while he ate supper with Nettles. The contents of the letter gave Daemon a sense of deep desolation, as he referred to the letter as "A queen's words, a whore's work". After thanking the maester for his forewarning, Daemon helped Nettles escape on her dragon Sheepstealer the next morning, as she flew into the Bay of Crabs not to be seen again for the rest of the Dance.

Daemon broke his fast with Lord Mooton, thanking him for his hospitality and declaring his intent to fly to Harrenhal to meet Aemond in battle. The arrival of Daemon and Caraxes prompted squatters within Harrenhal to flee in terror, after which Daemon stayed at Harrenhal in isolation for several days, patiently awaiting Aemond's arrival. A fortnight after his arrival, Aemond appeared at Harrenhal on Vhagar at last, bringing his lover Alys Rivers with him. A bastard of House Strong and former hostage of Daemon's, Aemond claimed that Alys told him where to find Daemon, as she had seen him in several visions. After conversing, Daemon took to the skies with Caraxes to face Aemond and Vhagar above the waters of the God's Eye, and the ensuing battle would later be known as the Battle of the God's Eye.

Caraxes dove down and slammed into Vhagar with intense force, and the two dragons grappled with each other, as their screams could be heard from several miles away. Caraxes' jaws sunk deep into Vhagar's neck, while Vhagar bit off a wing from Caraxes, and the dragons descended closer and closer to the water. Right before the dragons collided into the God's Eye, local tales claim that Daemon leapt from his saddle towards Aemond with Dark Sister in hand, and drove his sword through Aemond's blind eye. The dragons crashed into the water, creating a splash of water that was supposedly as tall as Harrenhal itself. Fishermen who witnessed the battle asserted that neither Daemon nor Aemond could have survived the massive impact of the crash, and Daemon's body was never found.

== Television adaptation ==
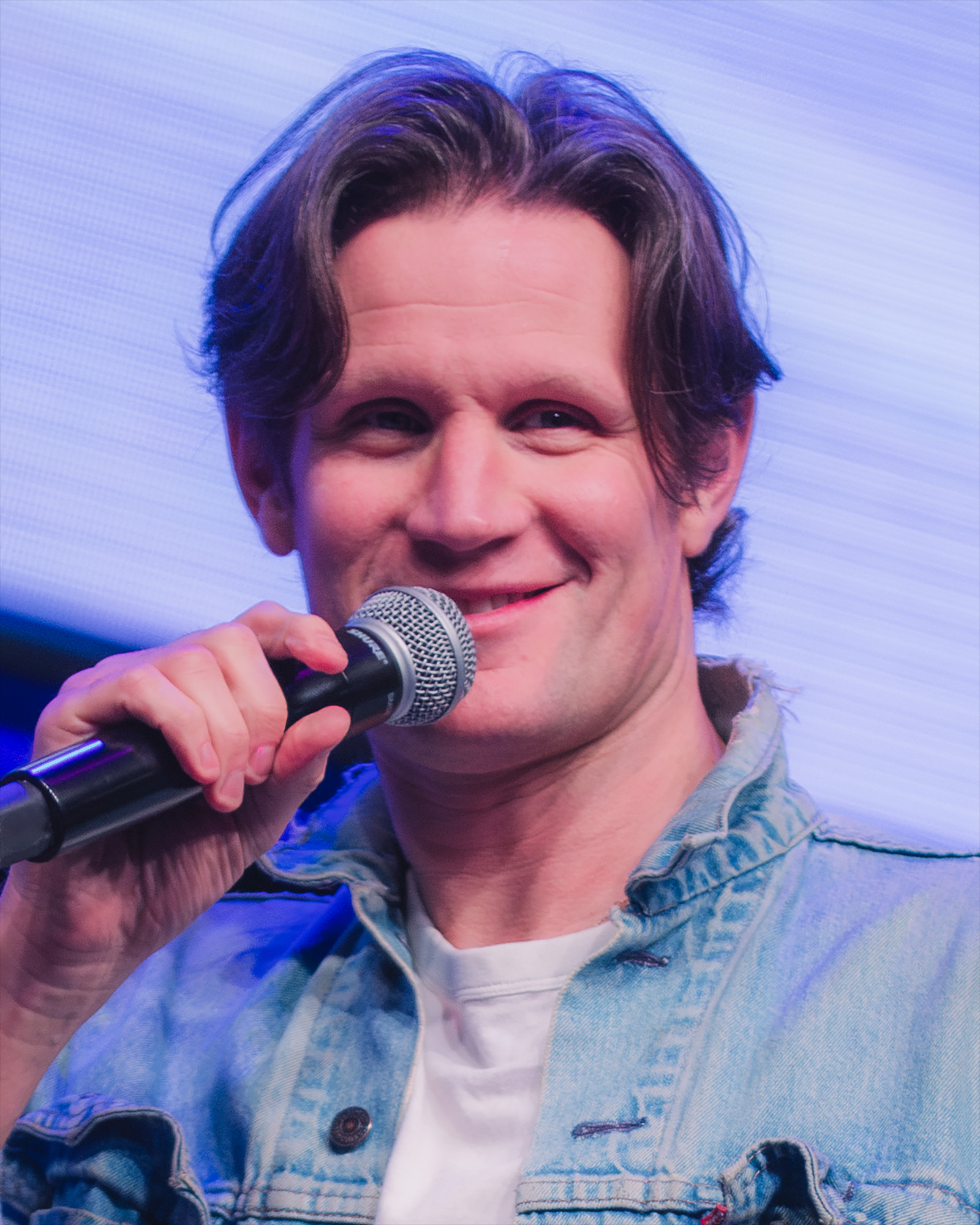
Matt Smith

=== Casting and development ===
In December 2020, Matt Smith was cast as Daemon for House of the Dragon, a prequel to Game of Thrones. Showrunner Ryan Condal cited Smith's performance as Prince Philip in The Crown as a major factor in casting Smith, praising his ability to "disappear into those roles." Though reluctant at first, Smith was convinced to join the show after learning of Paddy Considine's casting as Viserys, being a "huge admirer of Paddy's" who had always wanted to collaborate with the actor.

To prepare for their roles, Smith and several co-stars were required to learn the in-universe language High Valyrian. In an interview with co-star Emma D'Arcy (portraying Rhaenyra), Smith explained that while learning High Valyrian was challenging at first, he came to greatly enjoy learning and performing the language. He also found that speaking lines in High Valyrian while in-character as Daemon allowed him to explore "a different sort of authenticity to Daemon that isn't in the Common Language that I speak".

When speaking with Los Angeles Times writer Meredith Blake, Smith described Daemon as an "agent of chaos" who balances his strong familial duty with an embrace of "chaos and anxiety and madness". Officially, Daemon is considered to be a "fierce, albeit unpredictable warrior" who is commended for his bravery and combat prowess with swords.

Smith has been credited on the main cast from his first appearance in the series premiere "The Heirs of the Dragon" forward, as Daemon is one of few prominent characters who was not recast to address time jumps in Season 1.

=== Season 1 ===
At a great tourney celebrating the impending birth of his older brother King Viserys I Targaryen's male heir, Prince Daemon Targaryen is defeated by renowned knight Ser Criston Cole in rounds of melee and joust. After Queen Aemma Arryn tragically passes away from childbirth and her son Baelon a day later, Daemon mockingly refers to Baelon as the "heir for the day". This enrages Viserys, who disinherits Daemon as his heir in favor of his daughter Princess Rhaenyra Targaryen. Daemon then flees to Dragonstone with his lover Mysaria, stealing an egg from the Dragonpit belonging to Baelon and seizing the island with the strength of the Gold Cloaks. After a tense confrontation with Hand of the King Otto Hightower, Rhaenyra arrives at Dragonstone on her dragon Syrax and convinces Daemon to return the egg to the crown without bloodshed.

After Viserys chooses to marry Otto's daughter Lady Alicent Hightower over Lord Corlys Velaryon's daughter Laena, an angered Corlys invites Daemon to join forces in retaking the Stepstones from the Triarchy, which Daemon accepts. Their campaign in the Stepstones lasts for three more years, ending in victory when Daemon slays the leader of the Triarchy Craghas Drahar in the Siege of Bloodstone, with Daemon being declared "King of the Narrow Sea". After his victory, Daemon returns to King's Landing, where he kneels before Viserys and pledges his allegiance by handing him his crown from the Stepstones. Later, he sneaks out with Rhaenyra to the streets of King's Landing, where he takes her around to city establishments and seduces her, but finds himself unable to consummate their affair. Viserys learns of this affair through Otto's spies, after which Daemon is denied his request to marry Rhaenyra and is sent away to consummate his marriage to Lady Rhea Royce in the Vale. Upon arrival, Daemon knocks over Rhea's horse and crushes her skull, framing her death as a hunting accident.

Upon learning of Rhaenyra's union to Ser Laenor Velaryon, Daemon crashes a feast celebrating their nuptials, where he is mocked by Rhaenyra and catches the eye of Laena. In the span of the next 10 years, Daemon and Laena get married and have two daughters, Baela and Rhaena Targaryen. As they are in Pentos, Daemon is offered lands by Prince Reggio Haratis if he assists in combating the Triarchy, which Laena dissuades him from. Laena suffers from a prolonged labor that ends in an unsuccessful birth, driving her to commit suicide by dragonfire in her devastating grief. He reunites with Rhaenyra and Viserys at Laena's funeral on Driftmark, where he refuses to reconcile with Viserys and returns to court in King's Landing. Daemon and Rhaenyra once again sneak out at night, where they romantically embrace one another. As a rift grows between supporters of Rhaenyra (the black faction) and supporters of Alicent (the green faction) for power in King's Landing, Daemon accepts Rhaenyra's proposal of marriage to strengthen their power. Since Rhaenyra is currently wed to Laenor, Daemon convinces Laenor's male lover Ser Qarl Correy to fake Laenor's death under guise of a duel at High Tide, providing them reasonable gold to flee by boat on the Narrow Sea.

Six years later, Daemon supports Rhaenyra's second son Prince Lucerys Velaryon when his status of Corlys' heir to Driftmark is challenged by Ser Vaemond Velaryon, Corlys' brother. After Vaemond angrily calls Rhaenyra a "whore" and her three eldest sons "bastards", Daemon decapitates Vaemond. Daemon attends a feast with various members of the royal family from both factions, where he intervenes to stop a fight between Prince Aemond Targaryen and Princes Jacaerys and Lucerys Velaryon. After the feast, Daemon and Rhaenyra retire to Dragonstone with their respective children and their two sons Aegon and Viserys. While they are on Dragonstone, King Viserys passes away, and the green council led by Alicent and Otto conspire to usurp the throne by coronating Viserys' eldest male son Aegon II Targaryen as king. Upon hearing the news, Daemon believes that Viserys was murdered by the greens, and pressures Rhaenyra to declare war on their rivals. As Kingsguard knight Erryk Cargyll presents the blacks with Viserys' crown, Daemon places the crown on Rhaenyra's head and declares her as "Queen of the Seven Kingdoms".

=== Season 2 ===
Following Lucerys' death at the hands of Aemond's dragon Vhagar, Daemon demands that Princess Rhaenys Targaryen join him in travelling to King's Landing to kill Aemond and Vhagar, but Rhaenys refuses. He meets his former lover Mysaria as she is under arrest, offering her a pardon in exchange for recruiting assassins from King's Landing. After sneaking into the city and meeting the assassins "Blood" and "Cheese", he bribes them to infiltrate the Red Keep and murder Aemond. However, the two end up killing Aegon's toddler son and heir Prince Jaehaerys instead. This causes a rift between him and Rhaenyra, as she accuses him of ordering the killing of Jaehaerys and states that she is unable to trust him anymore. Following their argument, Daemon flies to Harrenhal to assemble allies in the Riverlands.

Upon his arrival at Harrenhal, the castellan Ser Simon Strong immediately surrenders the castle and pledges loyalty to Rhaenyra. That night, Daemon experiences a hallucination of a younger Rhaenyra sewing Jaehaerys' head back onto his body, and a mysterious woman claims that he will die at the castle. Soon after he has another vision where he decapitates Rhaenyra for insulting him, and the woman reveals herself to be Alys Rivers, a bastard of House Strong. He meets with Oscar Tully (representing his bedridden grandfather Lord Grover Tully) in the castle's hall, and sees a vision of Laena as Oscar hesitates to make any declarations while Grover is still alive. Daemon is also later visited by Ser Willem Blackwood, who pledges to raise an army if Daemon agrees to help House Blackwood defeat their green-aligned rivals House Bracken. After the Brackens decline to surrender, Daemon demands that the Blackwoods take the Brackens' seat Stone Hedge by force, emboldening them to commit terrorism on Bracken land. Having begun styling himself "King", a group of Riverlords confront Daemon about the brutality of the Blackwoods' taking of Stone Hedge, decrying him as a tyrant and refusing to recognize his authority. Around the same time, Daemon has a dream about his deceased mother Princess Alyssa Targaryen, in which she asserts that he was meant to rule instead of Viserys.

Daemon's mysterious dreams and visions continue, as he hallucinates a past conversation he had with Viserys following Aemma's death. Unnerved by his surreal experiences at Harrenhal, he accuses Simon of poisoning his mind with magic, which he denies. Preparing to depart, Daemon speaks with Alys, who recommends that he stay for another three days as she senses that something will change in that time. Upon learning of Lord Grover's death from Simon, Daemon assembles the Riverlords at Harrenhal for a discussion, where they are led by Oscar, the new Lord Paramount of the Riverlands. Oscar declares that he will honor Grover's oath of loyalty to Rhaenyra's claim, but condemns Willem's violence towards the Brackens and Daemon's enabling of these crimes. Oscar demands that Daemon behead Willem to serve justice and secure the support of the Riverlords, which Daemon follows through with. After executing Willem, Daemon sees Viserys once again, who explains the crushing reality of ruling over the realm and asks Daemon if he still wants the crown.

Soon after, Daemon is visited by Rhaenyra's envoy Ser Alfred Broome at Harrenhal’s godswood, where he pledges to back Daemon should he proclaim himself king. Daemon visits this godswood once again that night, as Alys convinces him to experience a vision of his fate and the future by touching the weirwood tree. In this vision, Daemon sees the deaths of him and Caraxes in battle, Rhaenyra sitting on the Iron Throne, an army of White Walkers marching in snow, and a woman with three dragons on her back. He is told by Princess Helaena Targaryen that he has a role to play in the prophesied Song of Ice and Fire, and that she knows what that role is. Rhaenyra shows up to Harrenhal with the dragonseed Addam of Hull, seeking to reaffirm Daemon's loyalty to her cause after being warned of potential treachery by Simon, who overheard Daemon's conversation with Alfred. As the two meet inside Harrenhal's main hall in front of Daemon's men-at-arms, Daemon confirms his loyalty to Rhaenyra's claim, bending the knee and declaring to his army that they fight for the queen.

=== Season 3 ===
Daemon and Oscar lead their combined forces to victory over the Lannister army in the Riverlands, after which Oscar informs Daemon that their leader Lord Jason Lannister fled the battle and is regrouping with the remainder of his host near the God's Eye. The Winter Wolves of the North emerge from the trees by the battlefield, where their commander Lord Roderick Dustin presents Jason's head to Daemon and declares that they have come to fight for Rhaenyra. Daemon, Roderick, and Oscar celebrate their victory at the Battle of the Lakeshore with song, as Simon appears at their camp and hands Daemon a letter informing him of Jacaerys' death at the Battle of the Gullet. Upon learning this, Daemon sets off to Dragonstone on Caraxes to comfort Rhaenyra in her grief.

As Rhaenyra lays in bed mourning Jacaerys and questioning her own campaign, Daemon reveals his visions of the Song of Ice and Fire with her, arguing that she should not let her sons' death be in vain. Daemon flies with Rhaenyra and the dragonseeds Ulf White and Hugh Hammer to take King's Landing, where Daemon defends Rhaenyra and defeats several green knights in the Red Keep's interior. As he and Rhaenyra are cornered by a squadron of Hightower soldiers, the City Watch led by Ser Luthor Largent pledges support to Rhaenyra out of loyalty to their former commander Daemon, purging the remaining green soldiers within the Red Keep. Daemon finds Otto in the black cells, presenting him to Rhaenyra and convincing her to behead him with her own strike, which she does. Daemon beheads Ser Jasper Wylde following Otto’s execution, as Rhaenyra ascends onto the Iron Throne.

Accompanied by Hugh and Ulf, Daemon travels to the Reach to demand that Ormund Hightower bend his knee to Rhaenyra and hand over Prince Daeron Targaryen, as Ormund deceivingly complies with his terms and promises to turn his host back to Oldtown. In the Red Keep, Daemon knights the three dragonseeds and recommends that Rhaenyra execute Daeron, as he is a rival to her claim. Rhaenyra turns down Daemon's advice of executing Daeron (who is revealed to be an imposter sent by Ormund), as well as his proposal of conquering Westeros to demonstrate Targaryen supremacy. To assist with the crown's financial troubles, Daemon flies to the Eyrie to lobby Lady Jeyne Arryn into lending the crown sufficient coin, which she agrees to despite their tension. Caraxes flies Daemon to a small cave in the Vale against Daemon's orders, where he finds Rhaena and her dragon Sheepstealer. He tries to console her as she feels responsible for causing Jacaerys' death, but is unable to rid her of guilt as she flees with Sheepstealer. After her departure, Daemon burns a nearby shepherd and presents his head to Rhaenyra as Sheepstealer's supposed deceased rider.

Daemon acts as a major advocate for the City Watch in the small council, conflicting with Mysaria's priority of the smallfolk. In response to the gruesome murder of several gold cloaks on the streets of King's Landing, Daemon rallies City Watch soldiers with an impassioned speech promising abundant payment once the assassins have been dealt with. While torturing a caught assassin, Daemon and Luthor learn that Ormund is the financier behind the deaths of city watchmen. Later, Daemon finds the grisly corpses of Luthor and several other gold cloaks at City Watch headquarters, with a blood-stained message reading "A Feast For Traitors". Many members of the City Watch resign, and Daemon seeks vengeance by infiltrating the streets of King's Landing in city watchman gear, where he captures a Hightower informant but fails to interrogate the informant before killing him. He also confronts Ulf for abandoning his post at Tumbleton to drink at a tavern, which causes a scene witnessed by many smallfolk and a spy of Mysaria's.

He returns to the Vale to find Rhaena, who intends to ambush Vhagar to improve her relationship with Rhaenyra. As the two meet in the mountains, Rhaenyra and Addam arrive on their dragons shortly after, where Rhaenyra and Daemon get into an argument as Addam chases Rhaena down. Their four dragons roar at one another and begin fighting, resulting in Sheepstealer receiving serious injuries. After the party returns to King's Landing, Daemon apologizes to Rhaenyra for lying about Sheepstealer's rider, and they mend their strained relationship. After the two learn that Aegon and Sunfyre are still alive, a distressed Rhaenyra orders Daemon to join the black army of Rivermen and Winter Wolves outside of Tumbleton.

Daemon strategizes with Roderick and Oscar, deciding that the Winter Wolves will scale the city's walls, Daemon will lead men through the main gate, and Oscar's soldiers will enter from side gates. Ser Gwayne Hightower parleys with Daemon after freeing Corlys, proposing that Rhaenyra be given authority over most of the realm while Daeron would rule an independent kingdom from Oldtown. Daemon ridicules the proposal and strangles Gwayne to near-death, sending him back into the city. After the Wolves scale Tumbleton's walls, Daemon burns the main gate open with Caraxes, and leads men-at-arms in a charge through the gate. He slays multiple Hightower soldiers in the city, as he is looking for Ormund and notices Hugh fighting alongside his men. He crosses paths with Ormund's second-in-command Bold Jon Roxton, and the two have an intense duel where Daemon is nearly incapicated by Jon before Ulf burns down the city in defiance of both armies, which separates the two. Daemon regains consciousness moments after the attack, witnessing the near-total destruction of Tumbleton and burned bodies all around him as he fights a few more Hightower soldiers. Corlys stops Daemon, informing him that the city is lost and they must retreat immediately.

== Reception ==
George R.R. Martin has called Daemon his favorite character from House Targaryen, describing him as a "very colorful and unpredictable character".

Daemon has been noted by critics and audiences to be one of House of the Dragon’s most compelling and divisive figures, with particular praise directed toward Matt Smith’s performance. Katie Baker of The Ringer described Daemon as “a cold‑blooded killer, a hotheaded dragonrider, and one of George R.R. Martin’s favorite ‘gray characters,’” noting that Smith’s portrayal maintained the character’s “impetuous (and incestuous) nature” while grounding him in moments of unexpected tenderness.

Smith has been commended for implementing physical acting choices into his performance, which worked to elevate Daemon’s complexity. During the filming of "The Lord of the Tides", Smith spontaneously replaced King Viserys’s fallen crown during a take, an unscripted gesture which director Geeta Vasant Patel described as “a turning point” in the brothers’ relationship. Reviewing the scene, Baker states that the “visual impact of the hale Daemon aiding and honoring the ghostlike husk of his older brother speaks volumes about… mortality and rivalry and family-first loyalty”.

Audience and critical responses to Season 2 were more mixed, as Daemon’s prolonged and vision‑driven storyline at Harrenhal was criticized for sidelining the character from major events in the Dance of Dragons. Devanshi Basu of Yahoo Entertainment reported that the subplot became “a running frustration” with fans, who complained that Daemon, “a character defined by violence and ambition”, was left “wandering a crumbling castle and speaking to goats.”

Despite these criticisms, Smith continued to earn praise for his intensity and commitment to Daemon’s character. In an interview with USA Today, Smith discussed Daemon’s loss of swagger in season 2, framing it as an intentional shift in the character’s psychological state. He explained that “Daemon is deeply affected by the spirits, or maybe his guilt from past transgressions”. In comments to The Hollywood Reporter reported by Bleeding Cool, Smith characterized Daemon’s appeal as being rooted in his “reckless, fearless mindset,” stating that the prince “doesn’t give a [expletive]” and acts without hesitation.

Smith’s performance has also been praised for its alignment with the show’s darker thematic tone. Speaking to the Press Association, Smith argued that House of the Dragon is “at its best” when covering its “darkest moments,” and that Daemon himself is “particularly at his best” in such scenes.
