= Iron Throne (A Song of Ice and Fire) =

Fictional throne from the novel series by Martin

- A Song of Ice and Fire series of prose fiction element
- The Iron Throne by Marc Simonetti, from The World of Ice & Fire (2014)
- Publisher: Bantam Books
- First appearance: Literature: A Game of Thrones (1996); Television: "Winter Is Coming" (2011)
- Created by: George R. R. Martin
- Genre: Fantasy

In-universe information
- Type: Government/Seat of office
- Function: Monarchy and the physical royal throne of Westeros

The Iron Throne, in the fantasy novel series A Song of Ice and Fire by George R. R. Martin, is the throne of the monarch of the fictional Seven Kingdoms of Westeros, and serves as a metonym for the monarchy of Westeros as an institution. The success of the HBO television adaptation Game of Thrones has made the show's version of the royal seat an icon of the entire media franchise. Martin said in 2013, "Say 'Game of Thrones', and people think of the HBO Iron Throne."

Martin called the depiction of the throne in his 2014 A Song of Ice and Fire companion book The World of Ice & Fire "absolutely right". He has noted repeatedly that none of the previous media representations of the throne—including books, games and the TV series—closely resemble what he had in mind when writing his novels.

== A Song of Ice and Fire ==
In the series, the Iron Throne is both a physical seat of office as well as a metonym for the monarchy of Westeros. Martin establishes in A Game of Thrones (1996) that after seizing control of six of the Seven Kingdoms, Targaryen ruler Aegon the Conqueror had made a throne for himself from the swords of his vanquished enemies, fused by dragonfire. Aegon had established King's Landing as the royal capital, and the Iron Throne itself sits in the Red Keep. Martin writes that according to legend, Aegon kept the blades sharp so that no ruler should ever sit comfortably. Centuries later, kings still cut themselves on the throne; it is a common belief that this happens to rulers who are unfit to rule.

=== Description ===
Purportedly made from a thousand swords and knives, the Iron Throne is a massive and asymmetrical tangle of jagged and twisted blades, in which reclining is impossible.

Have you ever seen the Iron Throne? The barbs along the back, the ribbons of twisted steel, the jagged ends of swords and knives all tangled up and melted? It is not a comfortable seat, ser. Aerys cut himself so often men took to calling him King Scab, and Maegor the Cruel was murdered in that chair. By that chair, to hear some tell it. It is not a seat where a man can rest at ease. Oftimes I wonder why my brothers wanted it so desperately. —Stannis Baratheon, A Storm of Swords (2000)

Martin commented in 2014:

I said repeatedly the Iron Throne is huge. It towers over the room like a great beast. And it's ugly. It's asymmetric. It's put together by blacksmiths not by craftsmen and experts in furniture manufacturing. You have to walk the iron steps, and when a king sits on it he's like 10 feet above everybody else ... He's in this raised position looking down on everyone.

=== Depictions ===
The Iron Throne has been depicted in comic books, in games, and on book covers, but Martin has noted repeatedly that none of these representations coincided with what he imagined:

A dozen different artists have done versions of the Iron Throne over the years. Some have been very striking, some less so, but none of them have ever been quite RIGHT. Their versions never quite matched what I saw in my mind's eye.

To Martin, the attempt closest to his vision was by French artist Marc Simonetti, for a Mexican edition of A Game of Thrones. The author subsequently worked with Simonetti to get an image the author calls "absolutely right". This depiction appears in Martin's 2014 companion book The World of Ice & Fire. He noted, "From now on, THIS will be the reference I give to every other artist tackling a throne room scene." Martin said of the image:

This Iron Throne is massive. Ugly. Asymmetric. It's a throne made by blacksmiths hammering together half-melted, broken, twisted swords, wrenched from the hands of dead men or yielded up by defeated foes ... a symbol of conquest ... it has the steps I describe, and the height. From on top, the king dominates the throne room. And there are thousands of swords in it, not just a few. This Iron Throne is scary. And not at all a comfortable seat, just as Aegon intended.

The various depictions of the throne include:

- The Art of George R. R. Martin's A Song of Ice and Fire (2005); Title page by Michael Komarck (Jaime Lannister on the Iron Throne)
- A Game of Thrones (2014); Cover by Marc Simonetti (Random House México, ISBN 978-607-31-2366-2)
- The World of Ice & Fire (2014); "The Targaryen Kings", art by Marc Simonetti
- A Game of Thrones: Genesis video game (2011); Box cover by Marc Simonetti
- A Game of Thrones: The Card Game; "The Price of Nobility" card (2009), art by Alex Aparin (Return of the Others set)
- A Game of Thrones: The Card Game; "Aegon's Legacy" card (2009), art by Veronica V. Jones (Secrets and Spies set)
- A Game of Thrones: The Card Game; "Robert Baratheon" card (2009), art by Chris Dien (Kings of the Sea set)
- A Game of Thrones: The Card Game; "Robert Baratheon" card (2010), art by Tiziano Baracchi (Kings of the Storm set)
- A Game of Thrones: The Card Game; "Oath of Fealty" card (2011), art by Magali Villeneuve (Where Loyalty Lies set)
- A Game of Thrones: The Card Game; "Cersei Lannister" card (2011), art by Magali Villeneuve (Lions of the Rock set)
- A Game of Thrones: The Card Game; "Varys" card (2011), art by Mike Capprotti (The Grand Melee set)
- A Game of Thrones: The Card Game; "Sitting the Iron Throne" card (2012), art by Alexandre Dainche (A Turn of the Tide set)
- A Game of Thrones: The Card Game; "Robert Baratheon" card (2014), art by Niten (A Dire Message set)

== Television adaptation ==
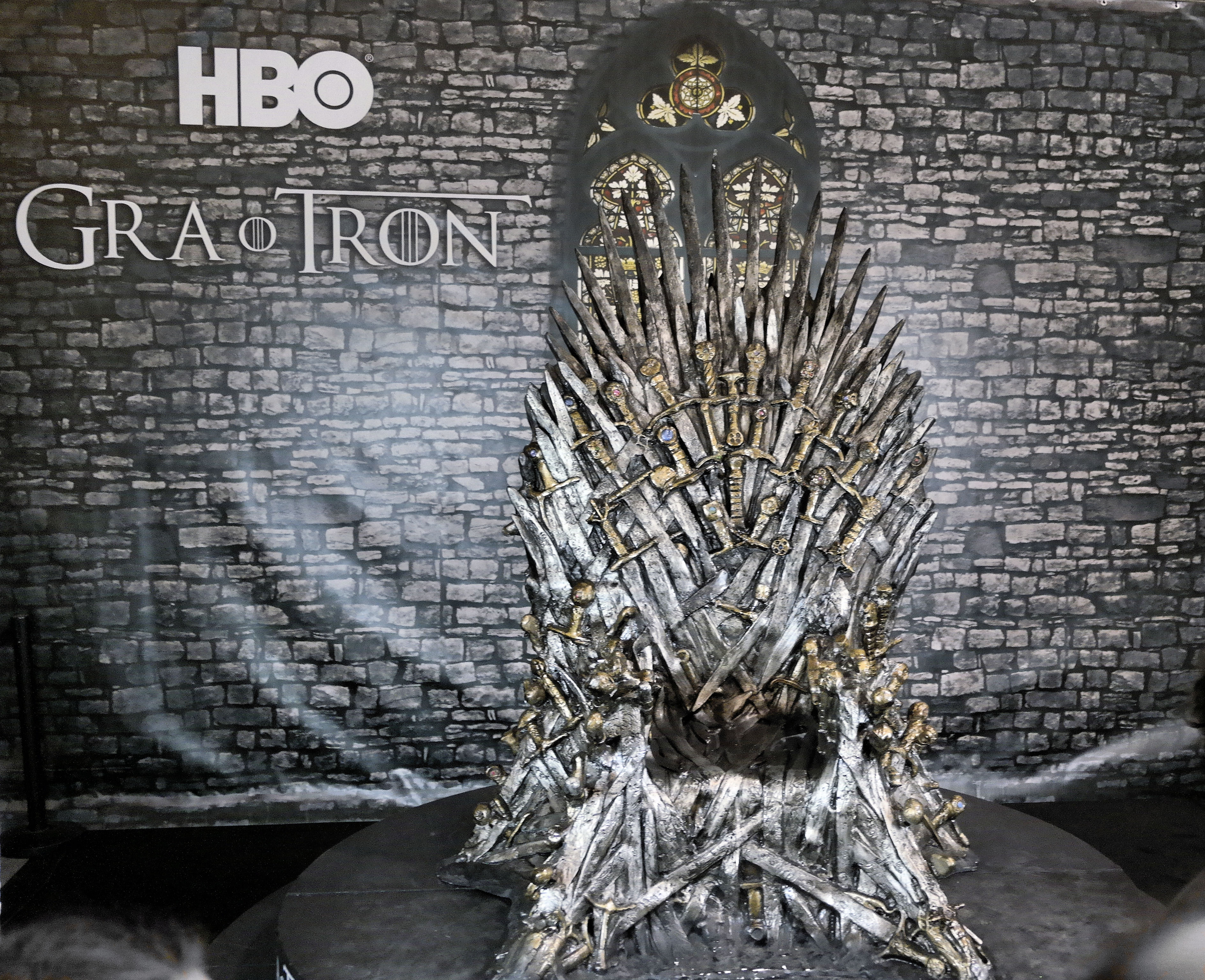
A replica of the Iron Throne as it appears in Game of Thrones, on display at Pyrkon in 2015.

The HBO television adaptation of the series, Game of Thrones, premiered in 2011. The design of the Iron Throne for the show was conceived by its production designer Gemma Jackson, and the prop maker Gavin Jones constructed the piece. The show's popularity has made its version of the throne an icon of the entire media franchise. It has been parodied in magazines and used in merchandising. Several "promotional thrones" travel the world with show-sponsored exhibits and for fan events. In June 2014, Queen Elizabeth II visited the Belfast set of Game of Thrones and was photographed examining the Iron Throne set piece from the series, though she declined to sit on it.

Though Martin had previously stated that the HBO version of the Iron Throne did not match his idea of how it should appear ideally, in 2013 he called its design "terrific" and claimed to own all of the merchandised replicas. He added:

I'm a realist about these things, and I know perfectly well that for millions of television viewers worldwide, the HBO Iron Throne is THE Iron Throne, and always will be. It turns up everywhere, on book covers, on magazines, in places that have no connection to the show. Say "GAME OF THRONES," and people think of the HBO Iron Throne.

Of the feasibility of recreating the throne as depicted in The World of Ice & Fire, Martin said in October 2014:

Now, you can't do this in the TV show. It's not something I criticize HBO for. The thrones they have are enormously large and cumbersome to move and expensive to build. To build this monstrosity, would blow the budget of an entire episode, and it wouldn't fit in the set. Our program is in the Paint Hall in Belfast in Northern Ireland. The Paint Hall is the largest sound stage in Europe. It [was] originally part of the old [Harland and] Wolff shipyard where they built the Titanic. We've divided it into a number of pods, and our throne room is in one of them. It's a very large set, but it's not large enough.

The HBO television series House of the Dragon, an adaptation of Martin's novel Fire & Blood, includes a larger iteration of the Iron Throne which more closely resembles the Throne as Martin envisioned it.

The image of Sean Bean as Ned Stark sitting in the Iron Throne is featured on the covers of the 2011 Season 1 DVD and Blu-ray Disc sets, released in March 2012.

In June 2021, a statue of the Iron Throne was unveiled as part of the Scenes in the Square sculpture trail in Leicester Square, London, to mark 10 years since the release of the first episode.

== Merchandising ==
HBO has licensed the likeness of its Iron Throne for merchandising since the show's premiere, including T-shirts and small replicas of varying sizes. In June 2012 the network began selling custom made, life size replicas of its Iron Throne for $30,000. HBO even partnered with Brewery Ommegang to produce Iron Throne Blonde Ale, released in March 2013.

The officially licensed merchandise includes:

- Game of Thrones 7′ 2″ Iron Throne Replica
- Game of Thrones 14″ Iron Throne Replica by ThinkGeek
- Game of Thrones 7″ Iron Throne Replica by Dark Horse/Gentle Giant Studios
- Game of Thrones Iron Throne Room Construction Set by McFarlane Toys
- Game of Thrones Iron Throne Bookend (7.5″)
- Game of Thrones Iron Throne Ornament (4.25″)
- Game of Thrones Iron Throne Stocking Holder (5.5″)
- Game of Thrones Iron Throne Blonde Ale from Brewery Ommegang
- Various T-shirts
