= Emma D'Arcy =

English actor (born 1992)

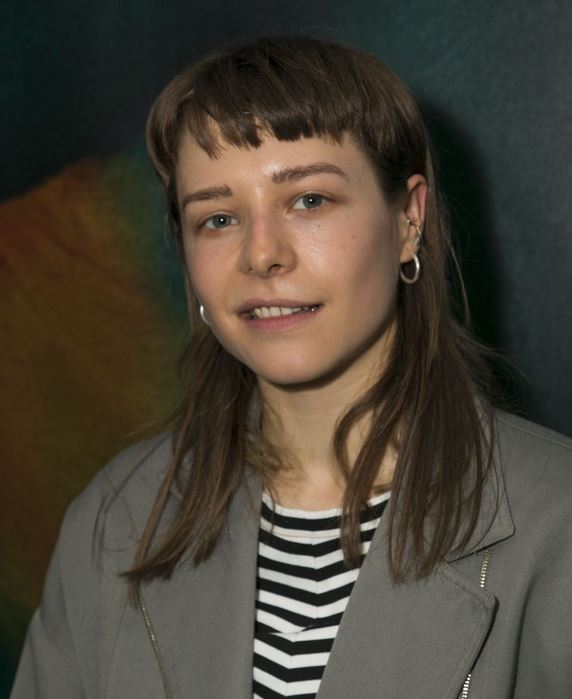
- D'Arcy in 2022
- Born: Emma Zia D'Arcy; 27 June 1992 (age 34); Enfield, London, England
- Education: St Edmund Hall, Oxford (BA)
- Occupation: Actor
- Years active: 2014–present

Emma Zia D'Arcy (born 27 June 1992) is an English actor known for their roles in the BBC drama Wanderlust (2018), the Amazon Prime series Truth Seekers (2020), and the HBO fantasy series House of the Dragon (2022–present). They earned critical acclaim and two Golden Globe Award nominations for playing the lead role of Rhaenyra Targaryen in House of the Dragon. They have also appeared in the films Misbehaviour (2020), Mothering Sunday (2021), and Digger (2026)

== Early life ==
D'Arcy was born on 27 June 1992, in the London Borough of Enfield in north London. In year six, they played Titania in a school production of A Midsummer Night's Dream, which they credit for introducing them to acting. They studied Fine Art at the Ruskin School of Art through St Edmund Hall, Oxford, graduating in 2015. During their time at university, D'Arcy took up theatre on the side with their friends, beginning as a set designer before moving into acting and directing.

== Career ==
=== 2014–2019: Early theatre and television ===
D'Arcy has appeared in several theatre productions; their earliest appearances were in Martin McDonagh's The Pillowman at the Oxford Playhouse, Romeo and Juliet at London's Southwark Playhouse, and Clickbait at Theatre503. In 2016, D'Arcy played Tammy Frazier in Callisto: A Queer Epic, directed by Thomas Bailey, at the Arcola Theatre. They starred as Bell in the April 2017 production A Girl in School Uniform (Walks Into a Bar) at the West Yorkshire Playhouse. In August 2017, D'Arcy appeared alongside Ben Whishaw in playwright Christopher Shinn's Against, at the Almeida Theatre. Writing for The Arts Desk, Aleks Sierz praised D'Arcy's performance as well as the production's "marvellous moments of wry humour and acute emotional insight."

In 2018, D'Arcy returned to the Arcola Theatre to portray Lucrezia in Hal Coase's adaptation of Virginia Woolf's Mrs Dalloway. D'Arcy was lauded for their "striking" performance and the production was commended for its stylish simplicity and theatrical flair. In 2019, D'Arcy appeared in The Yard Theatre's production of Arthur Miller's The Crucible. They were credited for being both riveting and compelling in their role as Elizabeth Proctor. The production won acclaim, with Fiona Mountford of The Evening Standard calling it the finest adaptation of The Crucible they had ever seen. D'Arcy was the Joint Artistic Director of Forward Arena Theatre Company. D'Arcy made their television debut as Naomi Richards in Nick Payne's 2018 BBC One and Netflix series Wanderlust. In 2019, they appeared as Alma Smith in the drama series Wild Bill.

=== 2020–present: House of the Dragon ===
In 2020, they played Sonia Richter in the Amazon Prime Video action drama streaming series Hanna. They also starred as Astrid in the 2020 Amazon Prime Video series Truth Seekers, a comedy horror series starring Nick Frost. In March 2020, D'Arcy appeared in the comedy-drama film Misbehaviour directed by Philippa Lowthorpe. In 2021, they portrayed Emma Hobday in the romantic drama Mothering Sunday. The film was directed by Eva Husson and explored class divides and postwar survivor's guilt in 1924.

It was announced in December 2020 that D'Arcy had been cast as Rhaenyra Targaryen in the HBO fantasy series House of the Dragon, a Game of Thrones prequel and adaptation of George R. R. Martin's companion book Fire & Blood. D'Arcy admitted that while they had been aware of Game of Thrones, they had not actually seen the show until after being cast in the role of Rhaenyra. They had however read Fire & Blood. The series began production in April 2021, and its ten-episode first season debuted in August 2022. In an interview with Entertainment Weekly, showrunner and executive producer Ryan Condal revealed D'Arcy's Rhaenyra to be, in many ways, House of the Dragon's most important character, with director Miguel Sapochnik labeling D'Arcy "the face of the show." The importance of the role led to D'Arcy being placed under much scrutiny, particularly after Milly Alcock's rendition of the character in her younger years had been positively received.

D'Arcy's take on the character however was an instant hit, garnering them widespread critical acclaim with critics including it among some of the best performances of the year. In her review for The A.V. Club, critic Jenna Scherer wrote, "It's impossible to look away whenever D'Arcy's expressive face is in the frame; even when the show itself drags, they electrify every scene they're in." Writing for Comic Book Resources, Philip Etemesi pointed to D'Arcy's strong theatre background as the reason for their "expert handling of such a complex character." Additionally, Marcus Jones of IndieWire praised D'Arcy's turn as Rhaenyra, proclaiming: "Though House of the Dragon is an ensemble series, viewers can tell just by D'Arcy's presence that their Rhaenyra is the star of the show."

In November 2022, D'Arcy was honoured by GQ as one of the breakout stars of the year. They were awarded Performer of the Week by TVLine for the week of 23 October 2022, for their performance in the season one finale "The Black Queen"; TVLine later went on to name D'Arcy the year's Biggest Acting Revelation. Out magazine's Mey Rude stated, "D'Arcy has stepped up to the plate in a role that would make most actors stagger, and has become an instant star in doing so." For their performance, D'Arcy received two Golden Globe Award nominations.

In 2026 D'Arcy appeared in the black comedy film Digger.

== Public image ==
For their role on House of the Dragon, British GQ named them one of the breakout entertainers of 2022, with the magazine stating that House of the Dragon "owed much of its plaudits" to D'Arcy's work on the show. In October 2022, a video of D'Arcy talking about their favourite cocktail, the Negroni Sbagliato, in an interview went viral. They were later credited with the drink's rise in demand.

In 2023, The Huffington Post included D'Arcy on its list of rising stars. In April 2023, they were ranked fifth on the Radio Times list of the top 100 most influential people in television. For their portrayal of Rhaenyra, D'Arcy was named among Variety's list of 2024 Power Women of Hollywood. Also in 2024, D'Arcy was included on InStyle's Breakthrough list of "30 Performers Defining Culture Now", credited for disrupting the status quo by blurring the lines between traditionally masculine and feminine styles.

== Personal life ==
D'Arcy is non-binary and uses they/them pronouns. They are in a relationship with director and screenwriter Thomas May Bailey.

In response to the 2025 Supreme Court ruling on the definition of woman in the Equality Act and subsequent Equality and Human Rights Commission guidance, D'Arcy was one of over 400 film and television professionals to sign an open letter pledging "solidarity with the trans, non-binary and intersex communities" and condemning both actions. D'Arcy had previously spoken about the "vitriol levelled against trans and gender-nonconforming people". D'Arcy is a signatory of the Film Workers for Palestine boycott pledge that was published in September 2025.

== Filmography ==
Key
†	Denotes films that have not yet been released

=== Film ===
Year	Films	Role	Notes	Ref.
2015	United Strong Alone	Sniper	Short	
2019	O Holy Ghost	Stephanie	Short	
2020	Misbehavior	Hazel		
2021	Mothering Sunday	Emma Hobday		
2023	The Talent	Tommy	Short; also producer	
2023	For People In Trouble	Jenny	Short	
2024	Rhoda	Louis	Short	
2026	Digger	Lina		
TBA	Stages †	TBA	Filming	

=== Television ===
Year	Series	Role	Notes	Ref.
2018	Wanderlust	Naomi Richards	Main cast	
2019	Wild Bill	Alma	Episode: "Dead Men Don't Return Library Books"	
2020	Hanna	Sonia Richter	2 episodes	
2020	Truth Seekers	Astrid	Main cast	
2022–present	House of the Dragon	Rhaenyra Targaryen	Main cast; 21 episodes	

=== Music video ===
Year	Artist	Title	Ref.
2016	Artificial Pleasure	"I'll Make It Worth Your While"	
2017	Little Cub	"Too Much Love"	

== Theatre ==
Year	Title	Role	Notes	Ref.
2014	The Pillowman	Michael	Oxford Playhouse	
2015	Romeo and Juliet	Romeo	Southwark Playhouse	
2016	Clickbait	Kat	Theatre503	
2016	Callisto: A Queer Epic	Tammy Frazier	Arcola Theatre	
2017	Against	Anna	Almeida Theatre	
2017	A Girl in School Uniform (Walks into a Bar)	Bell	West Yorkshire Playhouse	
2018	Mrs. Dalloway	Lucrezia	Arcola Theatre	
2019	The Crucible	Elizabeth Proctor	The Yard Theatre	
2024	Bluets	Performer	Royal Court Theatre	
2024	The Other Place	Annie	The National Theatre	
2026	The Other Place	Annie	The Shed	

== Awards and nominations ==
Awards and nominations received by Emma D'Arcy
Year (Note: The listed year refers to the date of the ceremony.)	Award	Category	Work	Result	Ref.
2022	IMDb STARmeter Awards	Breakout Star	House of the Dragon	Won	
2023	Golden Globe Awards	Best Actress – Television Series Drama	House of the Dragon	Nominated	
2023	Queerty Awards	Best TV Performance	House of the Dragon	Runner-up	
2023	MTV Movie & TV Awards	Best Breakthrough Performance	House of the Dragon	Nominated	
2023	Hollywood Critics Association TV Awards	Best Actress in a Broadcast Network or Cable Drama Series	House of the Dragon	Nominated	
2024	Saturn Awards	Best Actress in a Television Series	House of the Dragon	Nominated	
2024	Rolling Stone UK Awards	The Television Award	House of the Dragon	Nominated	
2025	WhatsOnStage Awards	Best Performer in a Play	The Other Place	Nominated	
2025	Saturn Awards	Best Actress in a Television Series	House of the Dragon	Nominated	
2025	Golden Globe Awards	Best Actress – Television Series Drama	House of the Dragon	Nominated	
