= List of House of the Dragon characters =

Television program characters

The characters from the medieval fantasy television series House of the Dragon are based on their respective counterparts from author George R. R. Martin's 2013 novella The Princess and the Queen, his 2014 novella The Rogue Prince and his 2018 novel Fire & Blood. The series follows the devastating war of succession for the Iron Throne of the continent of Westeros known as the "Dance of the Dragons", fought between Queen Rhaenyra Targaryen (the Blacks) and King Aegon II Targaryen (the Greens) and their respective supporters.

== Overview ==
= Main cast (credited)
= Recurring cast (3+)
= Guest cast (1–2)

Character	Actors		
Character	Season 1	Season 2	Season 3
Main characters
Viserys I Targaryen	Paddy Considine	Paddy Considine (Note: Uncredited appearance) (Note: Only appears in Daemon's visions during the second season.)	
Daemon Targaryen	Matt Smith	Matt Smith	Matt Smith
Rhaenyra Targaryen	Emma D'Arcy	Emma D'Arcy	Emma D'Arcy
Rhaenyra Targaryen	Milly Alcock^{Y}	Milly Alcock^{Y}	
Otto Hightower	Rhys Ifans	Rhys Ifans	Rhys Ifans
Corlys Velaryon	Steve Toussaint	Steve Toussaint	Steve Toussaint
Rhaenys Targaryen	Eve Best	Eve Best	
Mysaria	Sonoya Mizuno	Sonoya Mizuno	Sonoya Mizuno
Criston Cole	Fabien Frankel	Fabien Frankel	Fabien Frankel
Alicent Hightower	Olivia Cooke	Olivia Cooke	Olivia Cooke
Alicent Hightower	Emily Carey^{Y}		
Harrold Westerling	Graham McTavish		
Larys Strong	Matthew Needham	Matthew Needham	Matthew Needham
Jason Lannister	Jefferson Hall	Jefferson Hall	Jefferson Hall
Tyland Lannister	Jefferson Hall	Jefferson Hall	Jefferson Hall
Jacaerys Velaryon	Harry Collett (Note: Collett is credited as a guest star for the third episode of the third season.)	Harry Collett	Harry Collett
Jacaerys Velaryon	Leo Hart^{Y}		
Aegon II Targaryen	Tom Glynn-Carney	Tom Glynn-Carney	Tom Glynn-Carney
Aegon II Targaryen	Ty Tennant^{Y}		
Aemond Targaryen	Ewan Mitchell	Ewan Mitchell	Ewan Mitchell
Aemond Targaryen	Leo Ashton^{Y}		
Baela Targaryen	Bethany Antonia	Bethany Antonia	Bethany Antonia
Baela Targaryen	Shani Smethurst^{Y}		
Rhaena Targaryen	Phoebe Campbell	Phoebe Campbell	Phoebe Campbell
Rhaena Targaryen	Eva Ossei-Gerning^{Y}		
Helaena Targaryen	Phia Saban	Phia Saban	Phia Saban
Helaena Targaryen	Evie Allen^{Y}		
Orwyle	Kurt Egyiawan	Kurt Egyiawan	Kurt Egyiawan
Hugh Hammer		Kieran Bew	Kieran Bew
Alyn of Hull		Abubakar Salim	Abubakar Salim
Cregan Stark		Tom Taylor (Note: Taylor is credited among the main cast, though he only appears in one episode.)	
Addam of Hull		Clinton Liberty	Clinton Liberty
Ulf White		Tom Bennett	Tom Bennett
Kat		Ellora Torchia	Ellora Torchia
Gwayne Hightower	Will Willoughby^{Y}	Freddie Fox	Freddie Fox
Alys Rivers		Gayle Rankin	Gayle Rankin
Simon Strong		Simon Russell Beale	Simon Russell Beale
Ormund Hightower			James Norton
Jon Roxton			Joplin Sibtain
Roderick Dustin			Tommy Flanagan (Note: Flanagan is credited as co-starring for the first episode of the third season.)
Torrhen Manderly			Dan Fogler
Daeron Targaryen			Benjamin Evan Ainsworth (Note: Ainsworth is uncredited for his appearance in the first episode of the third season and is credited as co-starring for the fourth episode.)
Recurring characters
Mellos	David Horovitch		
Lyman Beesbury	Bill Paterson		
Lyonel Strong	Gavin Spokes		
Hobert Hightower	Steffan Rhodri		
Erryk Cargyll	Elliott Tittensor	Elliott Tittensor	
Arryk Cargyll	Luke Tittensor	Luke Tittensor	
Laenor Velaryon (Note: Although this character appears in 3 or more episodes, each of their actors appears in just 1 or 2 episodes each.)	John Macmillan		
Laenor Velaryon	Theo Nate^{Y}		
Laenor Velaryon	Matthew Carver^{Y}		
Laena Velaryon	Nanna Blondell	Nanna Blondell	
Laena Velaryon	Savannah Steyn^{Y}		
Laena Velaryon	Nova Foueillis-Mosé^{Y}		
Steffon Darklyn	Anthony Flanagan	Anthony Flanagan	
Harwin Strong	Ryan Corr		
Vaemond Velaryon	Wil Johnson		
Lucerys Velaryon	Elliot Grihault		
Lucerys Velaryon	Harvey Sadler^{Y}		
Jasper Wylde	Paul Kennedy	Paul Kennedy	Paul Kennedy
Talya	Alexis Raben		
Elinda Massey	Jordon Stevens	Jordon Stevens	Jordon Stevens
Allun Caswell	Paul Hickey		
Gerardys	Phil Daniels	Phil Daniels	Phil Daniels
Lorent Marbrand	Max Wrottesley	Max Wrottesley	Max Wrottesley
Alfred Broome		Jamie Kenna	
Bartimos Celtigar	Nicholas Jones	Nicholas Jones	Nicholas Jones
Simon Staunton	Michael Elwyn	Michael Elwyn	
Gormon Massey		James Dreyfus	
Martyn Reyne		Barney Fishwick	
Leon Estermont		Ralph Davis	
Eddard Waters		Tok Stephen	
Joffrey Velaryon	Stand-in (Note: Portrayed by multiple uncredited child actors.)	Oscar Eskinazi	Oscar Eskinazi
Sylvi	Michelle Bonnard	Michelle Bonnard	Michelle Bonnard
Rickard Thorne		Vincent Regan	Vincent Regan
Dyana	Maddie Evans	Maddie Evans	
Paxter Strong		Graeme McKnight	Graeme McKnight
Germund Strong		Paul Valentine	Paul Valentine
Axell Bulwer		Eddie Eyre	
Willem Blackwood	Alfie Todd^{Y}	Jack Parry-Jones	
Jeyne Arryn		Amanda Collin	Amanda Collin
Petyr Piper		Antonio Magro	Antonio Magro
Oscar Tully		Archie Barnes	Archie Barnes
Alysanne Blackwood			Annie Shapero
Luthor Largent			Tom Cullen
Edgar			Richard Flood
Adrian Redfort			Barry Sloane
Janos			Oliver Coopersmith
Sabitha Frey		Sarah Woodward	Sarah Woodward

Guest cast

- Siân Brooke as Aemma Arryn (seasons 1–2)
- Ben Dilloway as Soren (seasons 1, 3)
- Patrice Naiambana as the Dragonkeeper Elder (seasons 1, 3)
- Simon Chandler as High Septon Eustace (seasons 1, 3)
- Miriam Lucia as Lady Fell (season 1; uncredited season 3)
- Paul Clayton as Lord Merryweather (seasons 1, 3)
- Samson Kayo as Mujja (seasons 2–3)
- James Doherty as Cley (seasons 2–3)
- Abigail Thorn as Sharako Lohar (seasons 2–3)

Season 1

- Michael Carter as Jaehaerys I Targaryen
- Garry Cooper as Ryam Redwyne
- Julian Lewis Jones as Boremund Baratheon
- David Hounslow as Rickon Stark
- Frankie Wilson as Randyll Barret
- Gary Raymond as The High Septon
- Daniel Scott-Smith as Craghas Drahar
- Solly McLeod as Joffrey Lonmouth
- Edward Rowe as Howland Sharp
- Lucy Briers as Ceira Lannister
- Joanna David as Joselyn Redwyne
- Alana Ramsey as Lynesse Hightower
- Chris David Storer as Humfrey Bracken
- Gabriel Scott as Jerrel Bracken
- Paul Leonard as Beric Dondarrion
- Owen Oakeshott as Gerold Royce
- Rachel Redford as Rhea Royce
- Arty Froushan as Qarl Correy
- Dean Nolan as Reggio Haratis
- Haqi Ali as Kelvyn
- Roger Evans as Borros Baratheon

Season 2

- Sam C. Wilson as Blood
- Mark Stobbart as Cheese
- Ryan Kopel as Aeron Bracken
- Kieran Burton as Davos Blackwood
- Steven Pacey as Gunthor Darklyn
- Tim Faraday as Amos Bracken
- Aedan Day as Raylon Bracken
- Kenneth Collard as Forrest Frey
- Emeline Lambert as Alyssa Targaryen
- John-Paul Hurley as Lord Darry
- Anna Francolini as Lady Mallister
- Turlough Convery as Lord Mooton
- Daniel Fathers as Humfrey Lefford
- Robert Rhodes as Silver Denys
- Joshua Ben-Tovim as Brynden Rivers

Season 3

- Charlie Gordon as the false Daeron Targaryen
- Peter Polycarpou as Lord Gaunt
- Abigail Thaw as Lady Gaskell
- Peter Sandys-Clarke as Lord Bywater
- Adam Brown as Glendon Footly
- Alexandra Moen as Sharis Footly
- Lewis MacDougall as Tom Tangletongue
- Douglas Russell as Garrick of Whitegrove
- Abhin Galeya as Leo
- Daniel Boyd as Arrion Baratheon
- Will Stevens as the false Arrion Baratheon
- Joe Gaminara as Lyonel Bentley
- Richard Riddell as Walys Mooton

== Main characters ==
=== Viserys I Targaryen ===
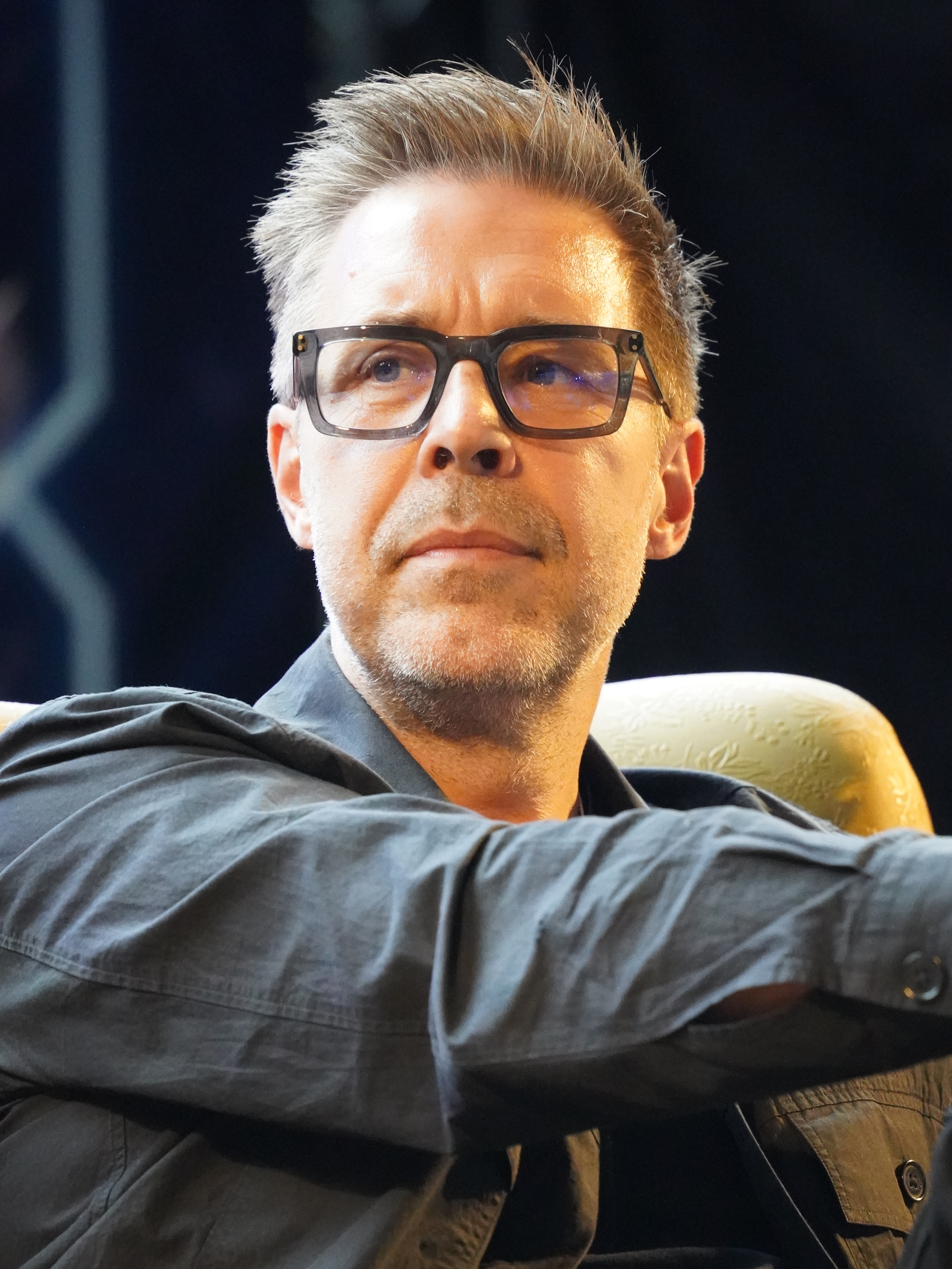
Paddy Considine

Viserys I Targaryen (portrayed by Paddy Considine), known posthumously as "Viserys the Peaceful", is the fifth King of the Seven Kingdoms. He is the grandson of the previous King Jaehaerys the Conciliator and the husband of Queen Aemma Arryn and later Queen Alicent Hightower. He is the father of Queen Rhaenyra Targaryen and the short-lived Prince Baelon Targaryen through his first wife, Aemma, and of King Aegon II, Queen Helaena, Prince Aemond, and Prince Daeron Targaryen through his second wife, Alicent. He was a dragonrider who was bonded to the dragon Balerion until he died of old age. He was among the candidates to succeed his grandfather as ruler of the Seven Kingdoms and during the Great Council at Harrenhal he was chosen as heir over his older cousin Princess Rhaenys Targaryen, despite her better claim to the Iron Throne. Nine years later, he held the Heir's Tournament to celebrate the birth of his son Baelon, but due to a difficult pregnancy, Viserys decided to sacrifice his wife Aemma by ordering Grand Maester Mellos to perform a C-section on her to ensure that Viserys gets a male heir, causing Aemma's death while Baelon dies anyway hours later. He then makes his only surviving child, Rhaenyra, his heir, a position previously held by his younger brother Prince Daemon Targaryen, and informs her of King Aegon the Conqueror's dream regarding the "Prince That Was Promised". He also cuts his finger on the Iron Throne, which, while seemingly innocent at first, would develop into a far worse infection over time. Still seeking a male heir, Viserys goes against the Small Council's recommendation that he marry Lady Laena Velaryon, the young daughter of Lord Corlys Velaryon, and soon marries Alicent who gives him a son, but Viserys decides to keep Rhaenyra as his heir anyway. He organizes a royal hunt on Aegon's second nameday while actively ignoring the ongoing War for the Stepstones and seeks to make a powerful alliance by marrying off Rhaenyra so she can have children to secure his bloodline further. To maintain ties with the wealthy House Velaryon, he and Corlys arrange a marriage between Corlys' son Ser Laenor Velaryon and Rhaenyra, repairing the rift between the Velaryons and House Targaryen. Ten years later, the cut that Viserys received from the Iron Throne began to take its toll, and Viserys became increasingly weak as the years passed and began suffering from a form of leprosy. To continue fulfilling his role as king, he began taking the powerful opiate milk of the poppy while opposing political factions formed under Rhaenyra and Alicent that Viserys was unable to stop from spiraling out of control. Six years later, as his body deteriorated and he struggled to walk, the Hand of the King Ser Otto Hightower now fulfilled most of Viserys' royal duties. Viserys holds a final family gathering, bringing his children and closest allies together in an attempt to stop any further conflict between them. While it was seemingly a success, he soon became delirious and bedridden, and with his dying words he mistakes Alicent for Rhaenyra and rambles on about the "Prince That Was Promised", but Alicent mistakenly believes that he was telling her that he wanted their son Aegon on the throne. Viserys soon dies from his illness, and the Small Council enacts a long-held plan to make Aegon the new king, despite Rhaenyra still being the chosen heir, reigniting the feud between Rhaenyra and Alicent's factions that eventually escalates into civil war.

In season 2, he appears during Daemon's mysterious visions while staying in Harrenhal.

=== Daemon Targaryen ===
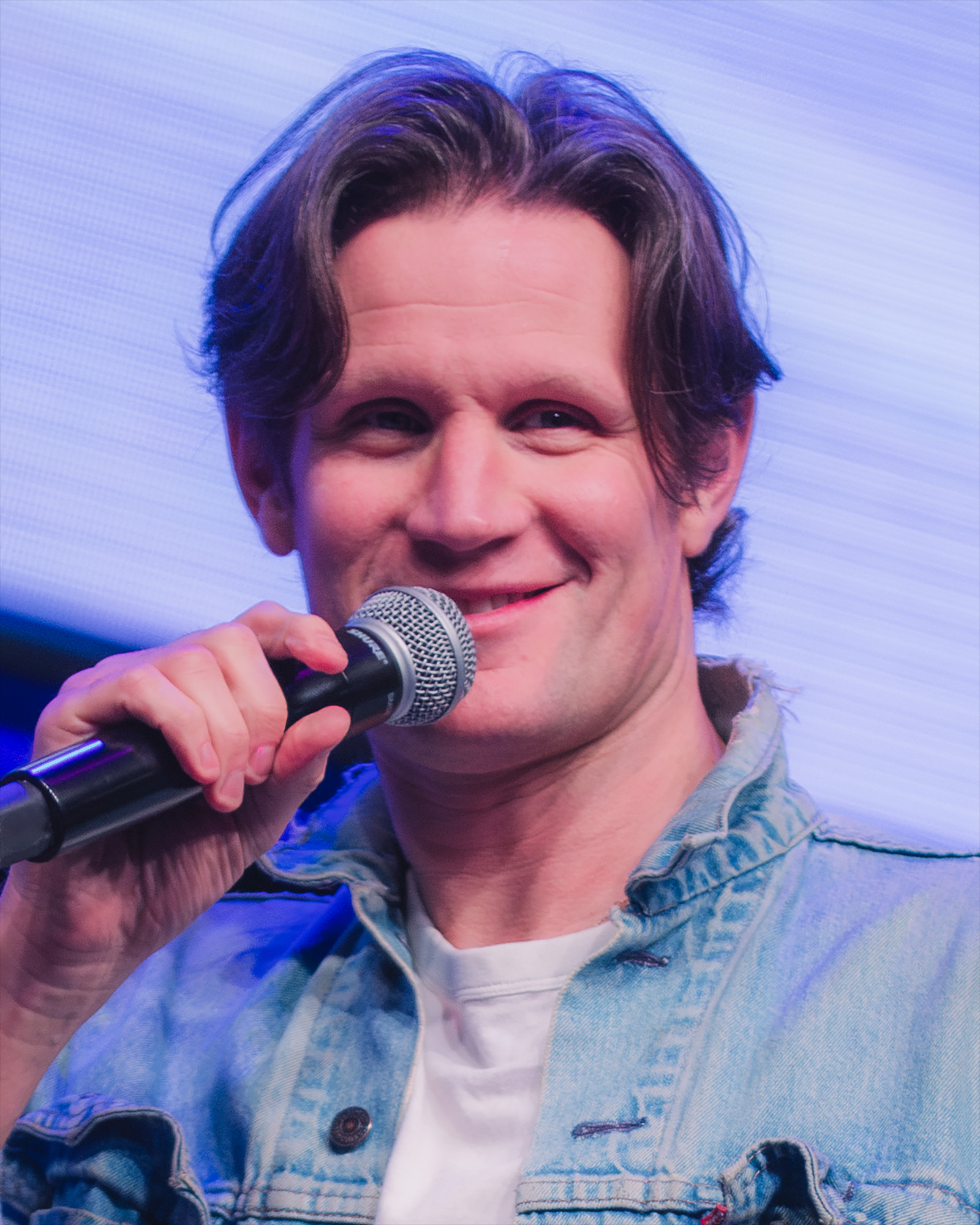
Matt Smith

Daemon Targaryen (portrayed by Matt Smith), also known as the "Rogue Prince" for his unpredictable behavior, is the younger brother of King Viserys I Targaryen and the husband of Lady Rhea Royce, Lady Laena Velaryon, and later his niece Queen Rhaenyra Targaryen. He is the father of Lady Baela Targaryen and Lady Rhaena Targaryen through his second wife Laena, and Prince Aegon "the Younger", Prince Viserys, and the stillborn Princess Visenya Targaryen through his third wife Rhaenyra. He is a dragonrider who is bonded to the dragon Caraxes and wields the Valyrian steel sword "Dark Sister". While he was the heir to the Iron Throne, he was considered unfit to rule by the Small Council due to his reluctance to be involved with politics and his brutal methods of dispensing justice as the Commander of the City Watch. Following the death of Queen Aemma Arryn and her infant son Prince Baelon Targaryen, Viserys disinherits Daemon after he mockingly referred to the deceased Baelon as the "heir for a day". Viserys then names his daughter Rhaenyra as the new heir, so Daemon and his lover Mysaria leave King's Landing and occupy Dragonstone. Daemon later steals the deceased Baelon's dragon egg simply to get his brother's attention by lying about it being for an unborn child of Mysaria, resulting in Rhaenyra retrieving the egg peacefully and Mysaria leaving Daemon after realizing he was just using her. After Viserys refuses to confront the threat of the Triarchy, Lord Corlys Velaryon requests Daemon's help in the War for the Stepstones. After a three-year campaign, Daemon kills the leader of the Triarchy, Craghas Drahar, during the climactic Siege of Bloodstone, winning the war, and is bestowed the title of "King of the Narrow Sea". Daemon soon returns to King's Landing and kneels before Viserys and abdicates his crown, claiming Viserys as the one true king. After discovering that Rhaenyra needs a husband, Daemon takes her into the streets of King's Landing at night, where he seduces her but is unable to consummate their affair. When Viserys is informed of Daemon's exploits, believing that his brother still sought the Iron Throne, he orders Daemon to return to his estranged wife Rhea. Daemon then travels to the Vale and murders his wife so that he can marry Rhaenyra. However, Rhaenyra is soon married to Ser Laenor Velaryon as part of a political alliance with Corlys, but Daemon manages to get the attention of and later marries Laena. Ten years later, Daemon, Laena, and their daughters live in Pentos until Laena suffers from prolonged labor during her third pregnancy and commits suicide. Daemon attends her funeral at Driftmark where he reunites with Rhaenyra who proposes marriage to strengthen her claim to the Iron Throne but cannot marry with Laenor still alive. Daemon then conspires with Laenor's lover Ser Qarl Correy to fake Laenor's death so he and Qarl can run away together, allowing Daemon and Rhaenyra to get married. Six years later, he attends Ser Vaemond Velaryon's petition to the Iron Throne to name him the heir to Driftmark. After Vaemond publicly insults Rhaenyra and declares that her children are illegitimate, Daemon decapitates him in response. Following the death of Viserys and King Aegon II Targaryen usurping the throne, Rhaenyra gives birth to the stillborn Princess Visenya Targaryen, and at the funeral, Daemon crowns Rhaenyra as the rightful Queen of the Seven Kingdoms.

In season 2, with the death of Prince Lucerys Velaryon, Daemon becomes frustrated with the inaction of Rhaenyra and her supporters. After he promises an imprisoned Mysaria her freedom in exchange for one of her agents, he hires the City Watch guard Blood and Mysaria's contact, the ratcatcher Cheese, to assassinate Prince Aemond Targaryen, but Prince Jaehaerys Targaryen is murdered and decapitated instead. Rhaenyra suspects Daemon of being responsible before stating that she cannot trusts him, leading to Daemon departing Dragonstone. Daemon flies to Harrenhal and singlehandly takes the castle for Rhaenyra's cause after Ser Simon Strong willingly yields to him. Daemon later experiences a vision of a young Rhaenyra sewing Jaehaerys' head back onto his body. When he awakens, Daemon finds himself at Harrenhal's godswood, where Alys Rivers tells Daemon that he will die there. He continues to have visions induced by Alys during his time at Harrenhal regarding his feelings of guilt surrounding Rhaenyra, Laena, Viserys, and his mother, Princess Alyssa Targaryen. He summons House Tully and House Blackwood to meet him at Harrenhal and discusses terms with Ser Oscar Tully and later Ser Willem Blackwood. Alongside Willem, Daemon confronts Lord Amos Bracken, who refuses to surrender, despite Daemon's threats that he will burn him alive with Caraxes. He then urges Willem to use terror tactics on the smallfolk living on the Brackens' lands. Daemon later begins the reconstruction of Harrenhal to garrison his growing army and is later informed that House Bracken has surrendered to House Blackwood, but several Riverlords soon confront Daemon over the brutality of the Blackwoods' pillaging and raiding and refuse to pledge their houses to him. After Daemon awakens from another vision, he threatens Simon with a knife and questions his loyalty before deciding that he should confront the Riverlords himself. Alys stops him from departing, and Daemon asks for her counsel. She convinces him that he should wait for three days, which he reluctantly agrees to. Three days later, Simon informs Daemon that Alys had attempted to aid the sick Lord Grover Tully, who died shortly afterward. Daemon soon holds a gathering of Riverlords at Harrenhal, where Oscar, now the Lord Paramount of the Riverlands, agrees to uphold his grandfather's oath and support Queen Rhaenyra Targaryen's claim to the Iron Throne. Oscar then demands that Willem be punished for his transgressions against House Bracken under Daemon's orders so that the other Riverlords can begin to trust him. Daemon obliges and beheads Willem so that he may finally form his army of Rivermen. After Ser Alfred Broome arrives in Harrenhal, he privately meets with Daemon in Harrenhal's godswood and tries to persuade him to claim the throne for himself. Alys later brings Daemon to the godswood, claiming that he is now ready to experience a final vision, this time of the future. Daemon experiences a multitude of visions, including the Targaryen bastard Ser Brynden Rivers becoming the Three-Eyed Raven, a White Walker marching with an army of wights, Daemon and Caraxes' deaths in battle, the birth of Daenerys Targaryen's dragons, and Rhaenyra sitting on the Iron Throne. Daemon is then encouraged by a vision of his niece, Queen Helaena Targaryen, that he has a part to play in deciding the future. After Rhaenyra arrives at Harrenhal, having been informed of Daemon's potential betrayal by Simon, Daemon pledges himself and his army of rivermen to Rhaenyra and her claim to the throne, stating that he will remain by her side.

In season 3, Daemon leads a host of Rivermen to fight the Lannister forces led by Lord Jason Lannister. In the aftermath, he disagrees with Oscar on how best to dispose of the fallen until Lord Roderick Dustin and the Winter Wolves arrive to declare their loyalty to the Queen and present him with Jason's severed head. After learning of Jace's death, he returns to Dragonstone to comfort Rhaenyra. Alongside Rhaenyra, Hugh, and Ulf, Daemon helps take King's Landing and storms the Red Keep with Rhaenyra, where Luthor Largent and the City Watch declare they remain loyal to him. He finds Otto Hightower and Jasper Wylde in the black cells beneath the Red Keep and executes Jasper after Rhaenyra executes Otto. Daemon later forces Ormund Hightower to bend the knee and takes "Daeron Targaryen" hostage, not knowing that he wasn't the real Daeron. He also knights Addam, Hugh, and Ulf in the Red Keep. To help with King's Landing's dire financial situation, he asks Jeyne Arryn for gold. Caraxes then leads him to Rhaena and Sheepstealer, and Daemon tries to calm his guilt-stricken daughter, who blames herself for Jace's death. After she leaves, he kills a shepherd and presents his head to Rhaenyra, claiming that he was Sheepstealer's dragonrider, but she remains unsatisfied. Daemon later investigates several gruesome murders of City Watchmen, and rallies the City Watch with promises that they will be paid handsomely despite the lack of pay at the time due to the city's financial situation. He and Luthor torture one of the killers to learn that Ormund is paying for the death of anyone in the City Watch loyal to Daemon. After reporting this to Rhaenyra, Daemon later returns to speak with Luthor, only to find him and several other City Watchmen murdered, with their bodies displayed and labelled as traitors.

=== Rhaenyra Targaryen ===
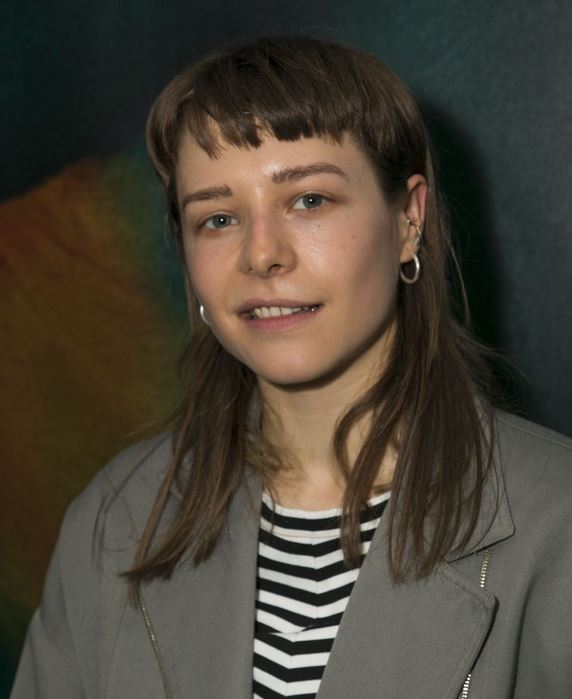
Emma D'Arcy

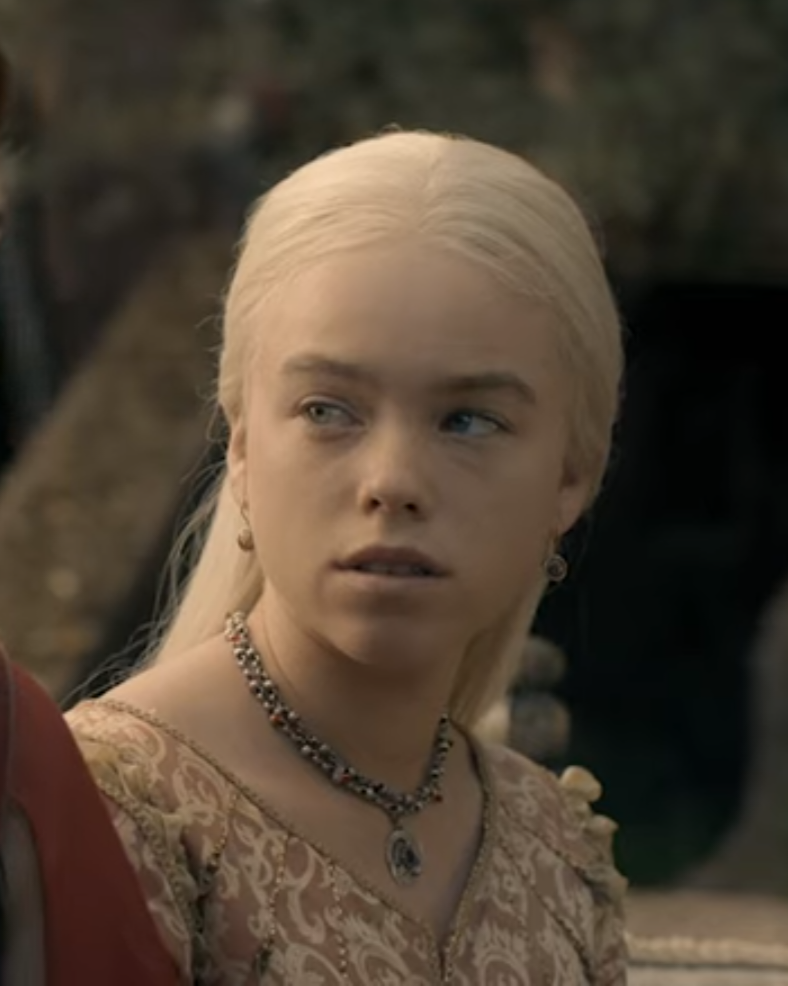
Milly Alcock as young Rhaenyra Targaryen

Rhaenyra Targaryen (portrayed by Emma D'Arcy as an adult and by Milly Alcock as a teenager) is the disputed Queen of the Seven Kingdoms. She is the daughter of King Viserys I and Queen Aemma Arryn, and the wife of Laenor Velaryon and later her uncle Prince Daemon Targaryen. She is the mother of Prince Jacaerys, Prince Lucerys, and Prince Joffrey through her lover Ser Harwin Strong, and Prince Aegon the Younger, Prince Viserys, and the stillborn Princess Visenya through Daemon. She is a dragonrider who is bonded to the dragon Syrax. She is also the childhood friend of Alicent Hightower, having grown up together in the Red Keep. Following the death of Rhaenyra's infant brother Prince Baelon, Rhaenyra is made heir to the Iron Throne, and Viserys informs her of Aegon the Conqueror's dream regarding the "Prince That Was Promised". Rhaenyra personally selects Ser Criston Cole to join her father's Kingsguard, and he becomes her royal protector. She also retrieves the deceased Baelon's dragon egg that was stolen by Daemon, who sought his brother's attention after he lost his inheritance to Rhaenyra. She is distraught after learning of her father's marriage to Alicent and grows concerned after she gives Viserys a son, Prince Aegon. After Daemon is victorious during the War for the Stepstones, he takes Rhaenyra into the streets of King's Landing at night, where he seduces her but is unable to consummate their affair. A frustrated Rhaenyra later seduces Criston instead despite his reluctance and the fact that the Kingsguard are sworn not to sleep with anyone. When Alicent confronts her about the affair with Daemon, she denies it, but Criston later confesses, which makes Alicent feel betrayed. After failing to find a husband so Viserys can have grandchildren to secure his bloodline, Rhaenyra agrees to marry Laenor as part of a political alliance with House Velaryon. Rhaenyra and Laenor come to an understanding that they will perform their royal duties together but that Laenor can continue his relationship with his male lover, Ser Joffrey Lonmouth, and Rhaenyra can continue her affair with Criston. However, Rhaenyra breaks off her affair with Criston, who then kills Joffrey during their royal wedding feast. Ten years later, Rhaenyra's first three sons have all been fathered by her lover Ser Harwin Strong, with Laenor being their legal father. Rhaenyra attends the funeral of Lady Laena Velaryon at Driftmark, but following an altercation that results in Lucerys partially blinding Alicent's son, Prince Aemond Targaryen, Alicent attempts to have Lucerys' eye gouged out in return, and when refused, she wounds Rhaenyra. Rhaenyra reunites with Daemon and proposes marriage to strengthen her claim to the Iron Throne, and Daemon helps fake Laenor's death, which allows him to go into exile in Essos, and Daemon and Rhaenyra soon get married. Following the death of Viserys and Aegon usurping the throne, Rhaenyra gives birth to the stillborn Princess Visenya Targaryen, and at the funeral, Ser Erryk Cargyll arrives with Viserys's crown, which Daemon uses to crown Rhaenyra as the rightful Queen of the Seven Kingdoms. She sends her sons Jacaerys and Lucerys as envoys to ensure that House Stark, House Arryn, and House Baratheon keep their oaths to support Rhaenyra's claim to the Iron Throne, but Lucerys is soon killed by Aemond and his dragon Vhagar.

In season 2, Rhaenyra discovers the partial remains of her son's dragon Arrax, but nothing remains of Lucerys, as he was devoured whole. She then holds a funeral for him at Dragonstone. Rhaenyra distrusts Daemon after he authorized an assassination plot that resulted in the death of Aegon II's infant son, Prince Jaehaerys - an act that greatly weakened Rhaenyra's popularity and led to Criston sending Arryk Cargyll to assassinate Rhaenyra in retaliation. She is saved by Erryk Cargyll, but the confrontation results in both brothers' deaths. After Baela Targaryen informs the Black Council of Criston leading an army into the Crownlands, Rhaenyra, with assistance from Mysaria and Ser Steffon Darklyn, infiltrates King's Landing disguised as a septa and visits Alicent at the Grand Sept in an attempt to make peace. Rhaenyra learns that Alicent had misinterpreted Viserys's final words regarding the "Prince That Was Promised", which led to her wanting to put Aegon on the throne. Alicent dismisses Rhaenyra's pleas and warns her that the war is inevitable. After returning to Dragonstone, her decision-making is repeatedly questioned by Lord Bartimos Celtigar, leading her to strike him in public. Rhaenyra sends Princess Rhaenys Targaryen to relieve the besieged Rook's Rest. Rhaenys and her dragon are killed by Prince Aemond on Vhagar. After that, Rhaenyra decides to find Targaryen-related dragonriders for Vermithor and Silverwing, to match the strength of Vhagar. A first attempt with Steffon fails when Seasmoke burns him alive. Seasmoke later bonds with Addam of Hull, leading to another attempt - opposed by Jacaerys, Bartimos, and the dragonkeepers. During the Red Sowing, the dragon Vermithor is summoned and kills dozens of prospective dragonriders until he is eventually claimed by Hugh Hammer. Also, Ulf White managed to claim the dragon Silverwing. The appearance of three adult dragons forces Aemond to retreat from Dragonstone. During a feast for her new dragonriders, she promises them knighthoods if they win the war and states her plan to send them to attack the opposing cities of Oldtown and Lannisport. Meanwhile, Aegon's rule in King's Landing is undermined by Mysaria having her spies had begun inciting harmful rumors, including that the upper class is living in luxury while the smallfolk starve, and then sends Targaryen-bannered boats filled with food, inciting a riot as thousands of smallfolk fight for the food and openly praise Rhaenyra for feeding them. Upon receiving a message regarding Daemon's potential betrayal, she heads to Harrenhal with Addam. She confronts Daemon, and he pledges himself and his army of rivermen to Rhaenyra and her claim to the throne, stating that he will remain by her side. After returning to Dragonstone, Mysaria comforts Rhaenyra after she debates sending her dragons to war despite the countless deaths it would lead to, but Mysaria assures her that her cause is just. She is later confronted by Alicent at night, who admits her faults and wishes to leave King's Landing open for capture so Rhaenyra can end the war quickly. Rhaenyra is dissatisfied with allowing Aegon to live, as his claim to the throne is what started the conflict, and she forces Alicent to choose between forfeiting her son's life or escalating the war. Alicent reluctantly agrees and is allowed to leave.

In season 3, Rhaenyra learns of the Triarchy's attack on the Velaryon fleet in the Gullet, but before she can act, Jace has Lorent Marbrand confine her to her chambers. After the Battle of the Gullet, she learns of Jace's death when Baela returns his body to Dragonstone. Rhaenyra is grief-stricken by the loss of her eldest son, and dismisses the majority of her Black Council out of anger for not stopping Jace. After Daemon returns to Dragonstone to comfort her, she then leads him, Hugh, and Ulf on their dragons to take King's Landing. She storms the Red Keep with Daemon and executes Otto Hightower herself after Daemon brings him to her and insists she cannot show weakness. She then sits on the Iron Throne and claims the city as hers. Rhaenyra struggles in her first days as queen, as she tries to appease the smallfolk and struggles with the dire financial situation that the city had been left in. She is unable to have a coronation after the High Septon refuses to crown her without proof of Aegon's death, despite her claiming otherwise. She also has Addam, Hugh, and Ulf knighted in the Red Keep, but angers Corlys for not legitimizing Addam and Alyn, making him furious at Rhaenyra's refusal, despite her own children being bastards. After Daemon takes "Daeron Targaryen" hostage, she plans to send him to the Night's Watch, only for Alicent to reveal that he is not the real Daeron. Rhaenyra then learns that Ormund Hightower had seized Tumbleton, who had declared for her, which she cannot invade or she would risk harming thousands of smallfolk. When she creates her Small Council, Rhaenyra names Mysaria the Mistress of Whisperers, Torrhen Manderly the Master of Coin, and allows Orwyle to keep his position of Grand Maester. When Daemon presents to Rhaenyra the head of who he claims was Sheepstealer's dragonrider, the one responsible for Jace's death, she remains confused and angry, as she wanted to question the rider and avenge Jace herself.

=== Otto Hightower ===
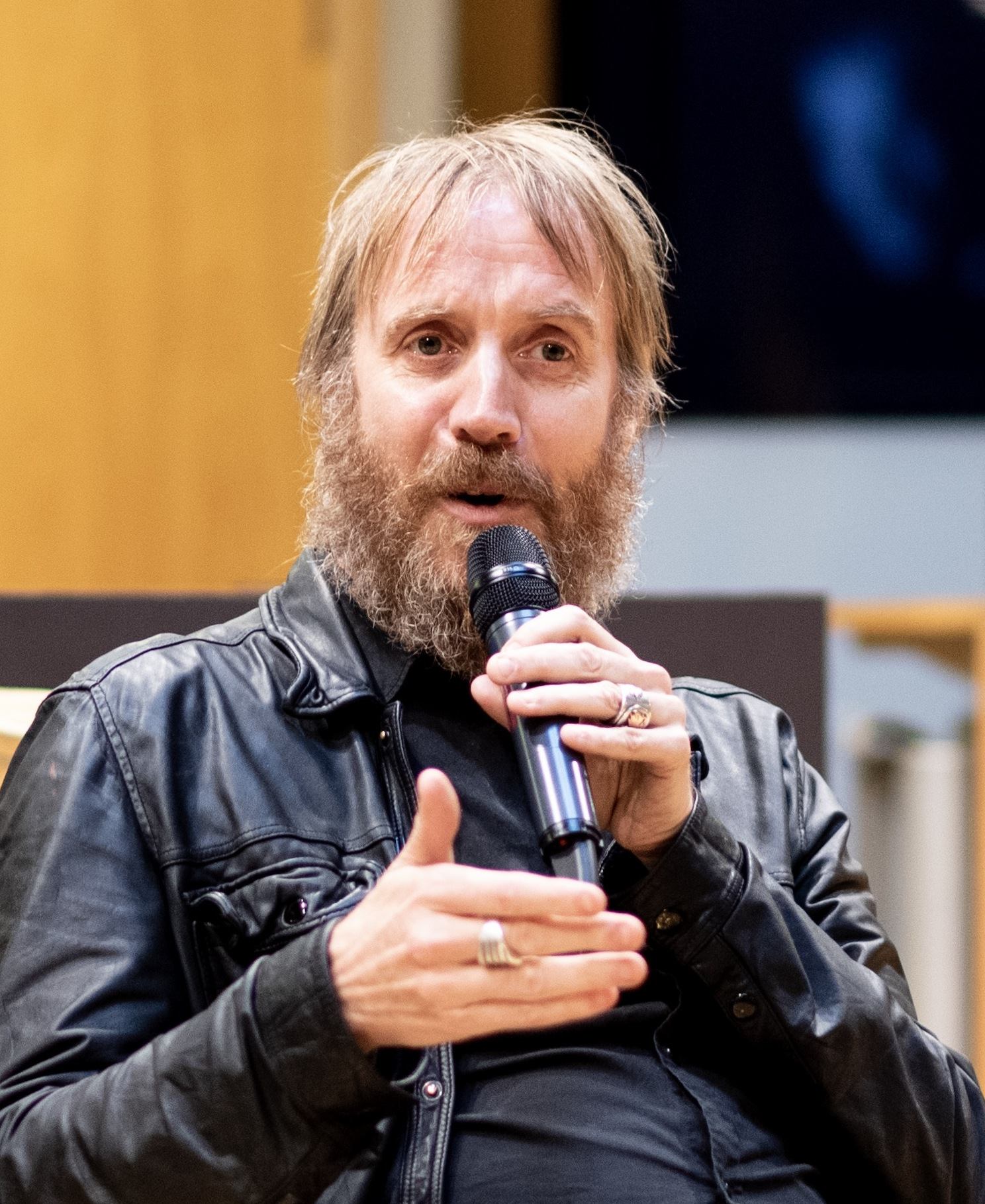
Rhys Ifans

Otto Hightower (portrayed by Rhys Ifans) is the father of Ser Gwayne Hightower and Queen Alicent Hightower who served as the Hand of the King on the Small Council under King Jaehaerys the Conciliator, King Viserys I Targaryen and King Aegon II Targaryen. Following the death of Queen Aemma Arryn, he encourages Alicent to become close to the grieving king; this results in their marriage and the birth of Otto's eldest grandchild Aegon. Otto is pressured by his older brother, Lord Hobert Hightower, to make Aegon the heir to the Iron Throne over Viserys's chosen heir, Princess Rhaenyra Targaryen, as it would strengthen their house's power. He is dismissed as Hand of the King by Viserys when he discovers Otto set up Alicent to become his wife, believing Otto's judgment compromised by his desire for the throne. Ten years later, Otto is reinstated as Hand of the King following the sudden death of Lord Lyonel Strong, orchestrated by Larys Strong to help Alicent, who wanted her father to regain his position. Otto spends several years conspiring with fellow Small Council members Ser Tyland Lannister, Lord Jasper Wylde, and Grand Maester Orwyle to usurp the throne and crown Aegon king, while Viserys succumbs to his crippling illness. Upon Viserys' death, Otto enacts their plan of crowning Aegon king.

In season 2, Otto urges Aegon to be miserly towards the smallfolk of King's Landing, thus securing resources in the impending war with Queen Rhaenyra and her supporters. Upon the murder of his great-grandson Prince Jaehaerys Targaryen, Otto orders a public funeral procession to turn the smallfolk against Rhaenyra, but Aegon's vengeance is unabated, and he orders the execution of dozens of innocents to apprehend one guilty man. This prompts Otto to openly question Aegon's judgment, as does the sending of Ser Arryk Cargyll upon Ser Criston Cole's advice to assassinate Rhaenyra. When Aegon dismisses Otto's efforts that helped make him king, Otto attempts to leave, but Aegon orders him to step down as Hand of the King and makes Criston his replacement. Otto returns to Oldtown with plans to mentor his youngest grandson Prince Daeron Targaryen. Sometime after leaving King's Landing, Otto is taken captive and secreted in an unknown location.

In season 3, it is revealed that Lord Larys Strong has Otto captured and kept him in the black cells beneath the Red Keep. When Rhaenyra takes King's Landing, Daemon finds Otto in the cells and brings him to the throne room. To make an example of her enemies, Daemon urges Rhaenyra to execute Otto, and she beheads him.

=== Corlys Velaryon ===
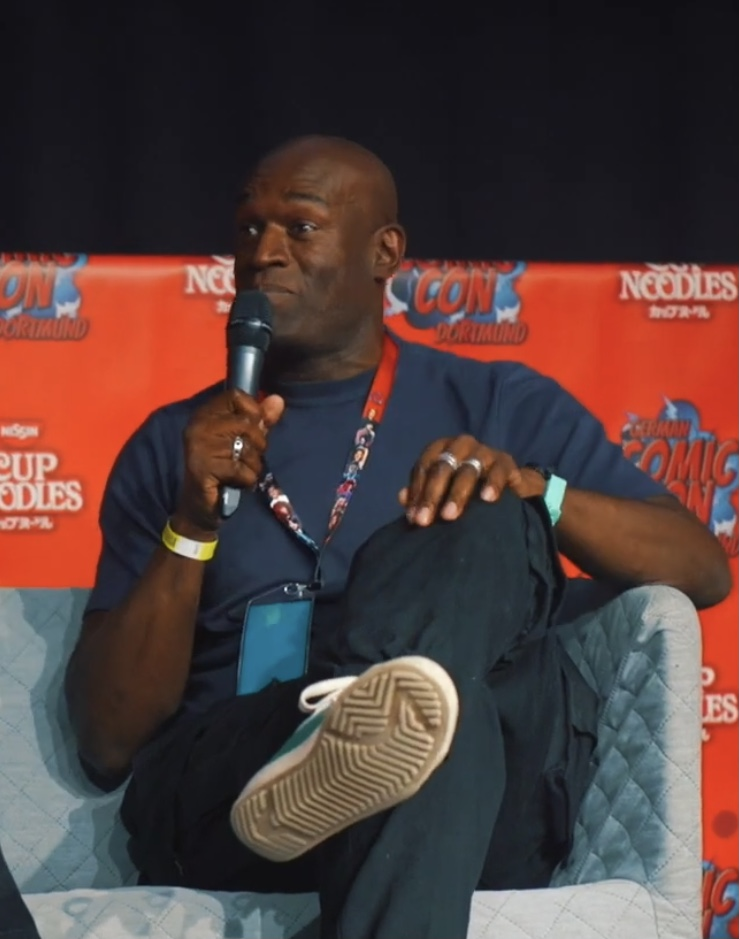
Steve Toussaint

Corlys Velaryon (portrayed by Steve Toussaint), also known as the "Sea Snake". He is the husband of Princess Rhaenys Targaryen and father of Ser Laenor Velaryon and Lady Laena Velaryon, and the father of two bastards, Alyn of Hull and Addam of Hull. Lord of Driftmark, the head of House Velaryon of the Crownlands, and the most famous seafarer in Westerosi history. He also serves as the Master of Ships on the Small Council of King Viserys I Targaryen and later as the Hand of the Queen on Queen Rhaenyra Targaryen's Black Council. Following the Great Council at Harrenhal, Corlys became enraged that his wife was passed over as heir despite her rightful claim to the throne. During the reign of Viserys, he was appointed as the Master of Ships but later resigned from his position after he became infuriated when Viserys married Queen Alicent Hightower over Corlys' daughter Laena, despite having the full support of almost the entire Small Council. When the Triarchy disrupts the Westerosi sea trade and therefore damages the profits and reputation of House Velaryon, he leads the War for the Stepstones against the Triarchy and enlists Prince Daemon Targaryen's help. After a three-year campaign, the Triarchy is defeated and pushed back to Essos. Corlys and Viserys soon arrange a marriage between Laenor and Rhaenyra, making their future sons the heirs to the Iron Throne and Driftmark. Ten years later, during Laena's funeral at Driftmark and after Laenor fakes his death and goes into exile, Rhaenys privately urges Corlys to make their eldest granddaughter, Lady Baela Targaryen, heir to Driftmark rather than Laenor's sons, whom they assume are illegitimate. Six years later, after Corlys is gravely wounded while fighting in the Stepstones due to the Triarchy's reemergence, his brother Ser Vaemond Velaryon is killed when he insults Laenor and the legitimacy of Laenor's sons during a petition to the Iron Throne to make him the heir to Driftmark instead. Following the death of Viserys and King Aegon II Targaryen usurping the throne, Corlys and Rhaenys pledge their support to Rhaenyra and send the Velaryon fleet to blockade Blackwater Bay.

In season 2, Corlys oversees the repairs of his flagship, the Sea Snake, and thanks the sailor Alyn, who saved his life in the Stepstones, but does not acknowledge their relationship. After Corlys later sees Rhaenys confront Alyn, she tells him that due to Alyn's parentage, he shouldn't be kept hidden away but be honored. Following the Battle at Rook's Rest, during which Rhaenys is killed, Corlys mourns the loss of his wife. On the orders of Rhaenyra, Baela offers him the position of Hand of the Queen, which, after initially hesitating, he later accepts. Corlys asks Baela to be the heir to Driftmark, but she refuses, stating that she is more Targaryen than Velaryon. He approaches Alyn to become his first mate on the Sea Snake and orders him to accept despite Alyn's reluctance. After learning that Addam has claimed his eldest son's former dragon, Seasmoke, he meets with Addam and praises him for the first time. He then asks if Alyn would also like to attempt to claim a dragon, but he declines. After Corlys' flagship is ready to sail, he renames it to The Queen Who Never Was in memory of his wife. He tells Rhaenyra that Addam can be trusted, but claims that he barely knows him, hiding the fact that Addam is his son. Corlys later tries to help advise Alyn on being his first mate, but Alyn angrily snaps back and blames Corlys for the grief and hardship he and Addam suffered growing up poor and without a father figure. Alyn still agrees to follow his order, and they leave Driftmark to join the Velaryon fleet.

In season 3, Corlys leads the Velaryon fleet during the Battle of the Gullet alongside Alyn. After witnessing High Tide being sacked, he navigates his ship through a rocky pass to bait Sharako Lohar into pursuing him. When their ship is rammed by Lohar's vessel, Corlys briefly fights Lohar but falls overboard. He is later recovered by Addam and promises to make Alyn his heir. After Rhaenyra takes King's Landing, Corlys asks her to legitimize both Alyn and Addam as "Velaryons", but after she refuses to legitimize Addam when he is later knighted, Corlys becomes furious at Rhaenyra's refusal to legitimize his sons when her own children are bastards. He then leaves the city to combat the remnants of the Triarchy, leaving Alyn to represent him on the Small Council. During this excursion, Corlys is captured by Jon Roxton and taken to Tumbleton. During his captivity, Corlys' ring finger is cut off by Ormund Hightower, who sends it to Alyn as a warning to Rhaenyra. On the eve of the Battle of Tumbleton, Gwayne Hightower, concluding that Ormund has gone mad, releases Corlys and presents him to Daemon in an attempt to sue for peace but is refused. Corlys then attempts to convince Daemon by suggesting he marry Gwayne's nephew, Daeron Targaryen, to Rhaena, but Daemon again ignores this and takes Corlys prisoner. Corlys remains outside Tumbleton during the battle but manages to take cover when Ulf White turns and incinerates the Tully army. After Ulf attacks Tumbleton, Corlys finds a shell-shocked Daemon and convinces him to retreat.

=== Rhaenys Targaryen ===
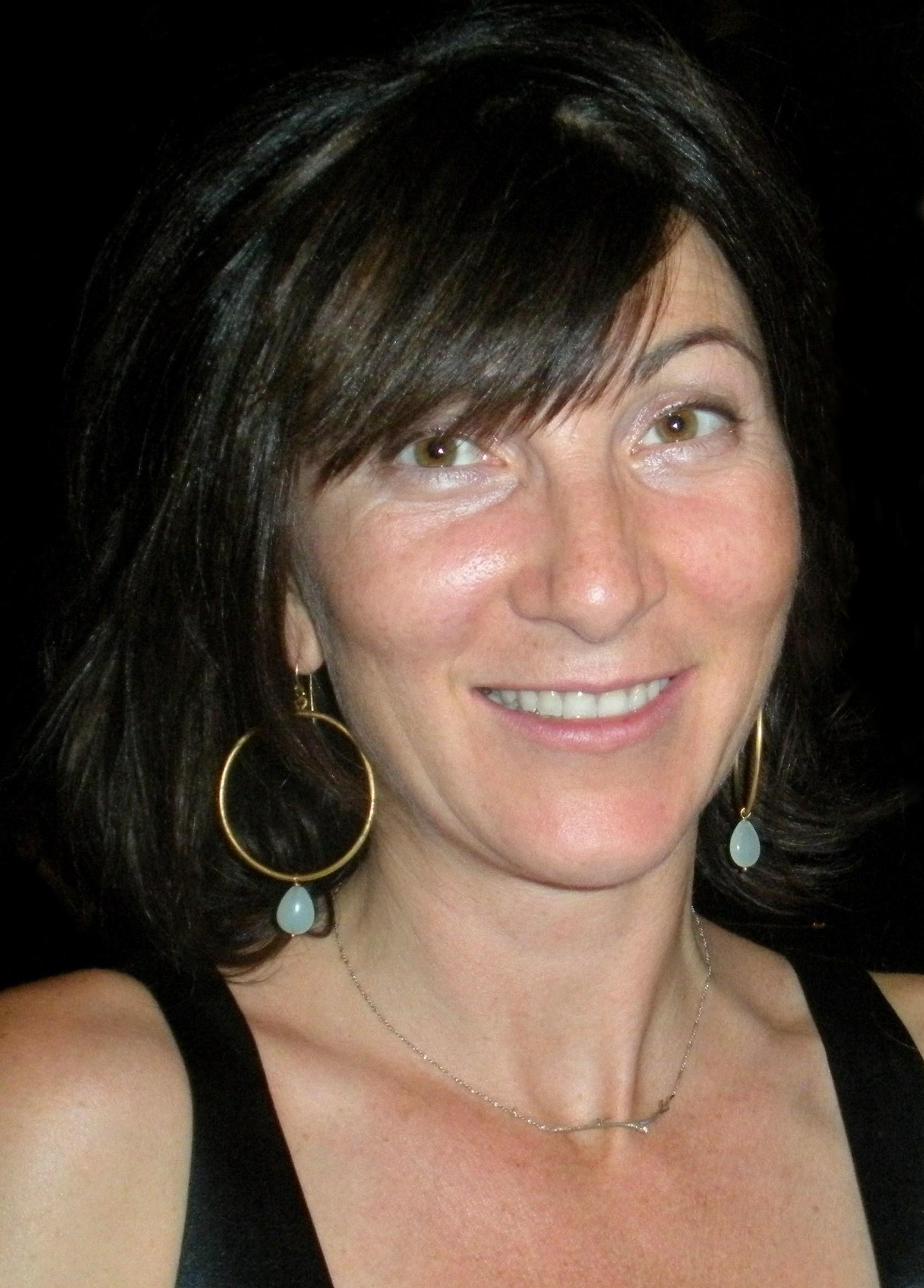
Eve Best

Rhaenys Targaryen (portrayed by Eve Best), also known as the "Queen Who Never Was", is a cousin of King Viserys I Targaryen, wife of Lord Corlys Velaryon and mother of Ser Laenor Velaryon and Lady Laena Velaryon. She is a dragonrider who is bonded to the dragon Meleys. She was once a candidate to succeed her grandfather as ruler of the Seven Kingdoms but during the Great Council at Harrenhal she was passed over in favor of her younger cousin Viserys due to her sex. Twelve years later, despite her protests that it may eventually get her son killed, she is convinced to allow Laenor and Princess Rhaenyra Targaryen to get married. Ten years later, during Laena's funeral at Driftmark and following Laenor faking his death and going into exile, Rhaenys urges Corlys to make their eldest granddaughter Lady Baela Targaryen the heir to Driftmark rather than Laenor's sons due to their assumed illegitimacy. Six years later, when Corlys fell gravely ill, she chose to support Prince Lucerys Velaryon's claim to Driftmark over Ser Vaemond Velaryon after he publicly insulted Laenor and the legitimacy of Laenor's sons. Following Viserys' death, Rhaenys is placed under house arrest and discovers that the Small Council was usurping the throne to make Prince Aegon Targaryen king over Rhaenyra. She is then freed by Ser Erryk Cargyll and escapes King's Landing on Meleys by bursting through the Dragonpit during Aegon's coronation. She then flies to Dragonstone and informs Rhaenyra of her father's death before she and Corlys pledge their support to her.

In season 2, Rhaenys patrols the Velaryon fleet's blockade of Blackwater Bay. After returning to Dragonstone, she is approached by Prince Daemon Targaryen, who demands that she accompany him to King's Landing to kill Prince Aemond Targaryen to avenge Lucerys' death. However, she refuses to act while Rhaenyra still grieves for her son. She is sent by Rhaenyra to help stop Ser Criston Cole's siege at Rook's Rest, and she flies Meleys into battle. During the Battle at Rook's Rest, Rhaenys and Meleys prove to be far more formidable than Aegon and his dragon Sunfyre, severely wounding the dragon until the arrival of Aemond and his dragon Vhagar, who engulfs Sunfyre in flame and sends him tumbling to the ground. Rhaenys engages Aemond and initially gains the upper hand but Vhagar ambushes and crushes Meleys' neck, killing her and sending Rhaenys plummeting to her death as they crash onto Rook's Rest. Following her death, to honor his wife, Corlys renames his flagship The Queen Who Never Was after her, which is later destroyed during the Battle of the Gullet.

=== Mysaria ===
Mysaria (portrayed by Sonoya Mizuno), also known as the "White Worm", is a former brothel dancer from the far eastern nation of Yi Ti who became Prince Daemon Targaryen's lover. She later commands her own spy network and serves as the Mistress of Whisperers on Rhaenyra Targaryen's Small Council. After Daemon steals the deceased Prince Baelon Targaryen's dragon egg, Mysaria is with him at Dragonstone when Ser Otto Hightower demands the dragon egg returned. She learns that Daemon, without her knowledge, announced that he and Mysaria were betrothed and that she was pregnant. She confronts him about the lie, and after realizing that he was just using her, she leaves him. She soon builds a spy network in King's Landing and informs Otto of Daemon and Princess Rhaenyra's secret exploits, which breaks down the trust between Otto and King Viserys I Targaryen. Sixteen years later, she has one of her spies, Talya, become one of the ladies-in-waiting to Queen Alicent Hightower, who keeps Mysaria informed of the king's ailing health. Following Viserys' death, she kidnaps Prince Aegon Targaryen and demands a meeting with Otto in exchange for Aegon's location. She threatens Otto to meet her demands to help the poor children of King's Landing, or she can have Aegon killed. Mysaria's manse is later burned down by Lord Larys Strong, under Alicent's orders, and Larys rounds up and executes all the household staff in the Red Keep to remove any of Mysaria's spies.

In season 2, Mysaria has fled King's Landing on a ship, but after it is intercepted by the Velaryon fleet, she is discovered by Ser Erryk Cargyll and imprisoned at Dragonstone. In exchange for her freedom, she provides Daemon with the name of one of her contacts in King's Landing, which indirectly causes the death of Prince Jaehaerys Targaryen. Despite this, Rhaenyra chooses to release her. Before she can leave Dragonstone, she spots Ser Arryk Cargyll, who had snuck onto Dragonstone, and warns Erryk of his arrival, which saves Rhaenyra's life. She then requests to join Rhaenyra's Black Council to serve as her advisor while seeking retribution against House Hightower. She assists Rhaenyra in infiltrating King's Landing so she can secretly meet with Alicent. She later sends Elinda Massey, Rhaenyra's lady-in-waiting, to sneak into King's Landing to meet with the barmaid Dyana to help incite rumors among the smallfolk. Mysaria reports to Rhaenyra that her spies had begun inciting harmful rumors in King's Landing to undermine Aegon's rule, including that the upper class is living in luxury while the smallfolk starve. She then sends Targaryen-bannered boats filled with food to King's Landing, which incites a riot as thousands of smallfolk fight for the food and openly praise Rhaenyra for feeding them. She reports her success to Rhaenyra and reassures her after she has doubts about winning the war. Mysaria then tells Rhaenyra of her past, of how her father raped and scarred her when she was a child, which taught her not to trust anyone. She then expresses that she remains loyal to Rhaenyra as she treats Mysaria as an equal. Rhaenyra then comforts Mysaria, and they passionately kiss until they are interrupted by news that the dragon Seasmoke has been claimed. Due to a lack of noble houses with Targaryen ancestors, Mysaria recommends that Rhaenyra seek out bastards instead. At the behest of Rhaenyra, she sends word to Elinda in King's Landing to help spread the word that Rhaenyra is seeking bastards with Valyrian blood in an attempt to find new dragonriders, and Alyn of Hull helps ferry them to Dragonstone, including Hugh Hammer and Ulf White. She comforts Rhaenyra after she debates sending her dragons to war despite the countless deaths it would lead to, but Mysaria assures her that her cause is just and that ending the war quickly would prevent even more deaths in the future.

In season 3, after Rhaenyra takes King's Landing, she names Mysaria as her Mistress of Whisperers on the Small Council, despite Daemon's reluctance to have his former lover around. Mysaria convinces Rhaenyra to make Torrhen Manderly the Master of Coin, so that the smallfolk can blame him for the city's dire financial situation. Mysaria has her spies begin to monitor Alicent, so when Alicent and Helaena attempt to escape the Red Keep, Mysaria easily catches them and discovers that Helaena is pregnant. Alicent then tries to convince her not to tell Rhaenyra of Helaena's pregnancy, offering to grant her a favor in return.

=== Criston Cole ===
Criston Cole (portrayed by Fabien Frankel) is a knight from the Dornish Marches and the common-born son of the steward to the Lord of Blackhaven. He is a member of the Kingsguard under King Viserys I Targaryen and King Aegon II Targaryen. During Aegon's reign, he succeeds Ser Harrold Westerling as the Lord Commander of the Kingsguard and later succeeds Ser Otto Hightower as Hand of the King on the Small Council. He participates in the Heir's Tournament, and manages to defeat Lord Boremund Baratheon and Prince Daemon Targaryen, first in a joust and then in single combat, and receives the favor of Princess Rhaenyra Targaryen. Following the death of Ser Ryam Redwyne, he is appointed to the Kingsguard at Rhaenyra's insistence and becomes her royal protector. Rhaenyra later pressures Criston into having an affair with her following her exploits with Daemon, breaking his Kingsguard vows not to sleep with anyone. When Ser Laenor Velaryon and Rhaenyra are engaged to be married, Criston asks her to run away with him, but she refuses, leaving Criston distraught. Criston later confesses his sins to Queen Alicent Hightower, who is hurt by Rhaenyra's actions but keeps his secret. At the royal wedding feast of Laenor and Rhaenyra, Ser Joffrey Lonmouth, Laenor's lover, informs Criston that he's aware of his affair with Rhaenyra. Criston perceives this as a threat, beats Joffrey to death, and later prepares to take his own life but is interrupted by Alicent. Ten years later, Criston is training Rhaenyra's son in swordsmanship and provokes Ser Harwin Strong after he insinuates that Rhaenyra and Laenor's sons are in fact his, which leads to Harwin leaving King's Landing. Six years later, following the death of Viserys, Criston kills Lord Lyman Beesbury, who protested the rest of the Small Council's plot to put Prince Aegon on the throne in place of Rhaenyra. Criston also replaces Lord Commander Harold Westerling, who resigned from the Kingsguard in protest, and crowns Aegon king at the Dragonpit.

In season 2, Criston has begun a sexual relationship with Alicent, whom he is sleeping with during the murder of Prince Jaehaerys Targaryen. Feeling guilty for not being there to guard Jaehaerys, Criston sends Ser Arryk Cargyll to assassinate Rhaenyra. After Criston informs the king of this, Aegon soon removes Otto as Hand of the King due to his perceived lack of action in seeking retribution and appoints Criston to succeed him. He is charged with leading an army alongside Ser Gwayne Hightower into the Crownlands to either convince those who declared for Rhaenyra to surrender or have them killed, and asks for Alicent's favor before he leaves. They are later discovered by Lady Baela Targaryen, who reports their movements to the Black Council. Criston manages to convince House Rosby and House Stokeworth to join his forces without a fight, and after executing Lord Gunthor Darklyn following the Sack of Duskendale, he gains the Darklyn forces as well. He then leads his combined armies into the Battle at Rook's Rest, where they lay siege to the castle until he witnesses the dragon battle between Princess Rhaenys Targaryen, Aegon, and Aemond. After Aegon and his dragon Sunfyre are knocked out of the sky, Criston rushes to aid the fallen king. After returning to King's Landing, he parades the dragon Meleys' head through the streets, much to the horror of the smallfolk. When selecting a regent to take over while Aegon recovers from his injuries, he advocates for Aemond over Alicent. He later leaves King's Landing with Gwayne and their army once again to march into the Riverlands. While camping in the Riverlands, Gwayne draws his sword on Criston after noticing he has Alicent's favor and accuses Criston of sleeping with his sister. Criston states how he remains loyal to Alicent after she helped prevent him from committing suicide and that she keeps him fighting. He bleakly compares how useless he feels as a soldier after he witnessed hundreds of men be killed by dragons during the Battle at Rook's Rest and how his death will be a relief from his guilt.

In season 3, Criston and Gwayne remain camped in the Riverlands as they plan to march their army to take Harrenhal. After Aemond arrives with Vhagar, they continue their campaign and follow him to Harrenhal. After reaching Harrenhal, they find that Aemond is already gone. After learning that Rhaenyra has taken King's Landing, Criston becomes increasingly nihilistic and feels betrayed by Aemond. He tells Gwayne that there is no life for him with Rhaenyra on the throne, and suggests his army employ guerrilla warfare tactics against Daemon's forces in the Riverlands, despite knowing it will be a death sentence. He tells Gwayne this would be an honorable death as opposed to being crushed or burned in a skirmish with a dragon, and dismisses Gwayne's suggestion of joining his cousin Ormund in Tumbleton. Criston leads a guerrilla campaign to slow down Oscar Tully's forces by burning river crossings and attacking their camps during the night. Criston then has his army race to beat the Tully forces to a river crossing at Stoney Sept, but they are too late. Having lost many men to exhaustion or desertion, Gwayne tries to convince Criston to end their campaign now they have no hope of succeeding, but after Criston states he plans to die in combat, Gwayne abandons him. Criston and the remainder of his men are later ambushed by Oscar's forces, who posed as dead soldiers. This allows the rest of Oscar and Roderick Dustin's men to surround Criston. He meets with Oscar and Roderick and requests a duel so he can die an honorable death, but Criston is killed after he is shot by three arrows fired by Alysanne Blackwood. The rest of his men are then wiped out by Oscar's forces.

=== Alicent Hightower ===
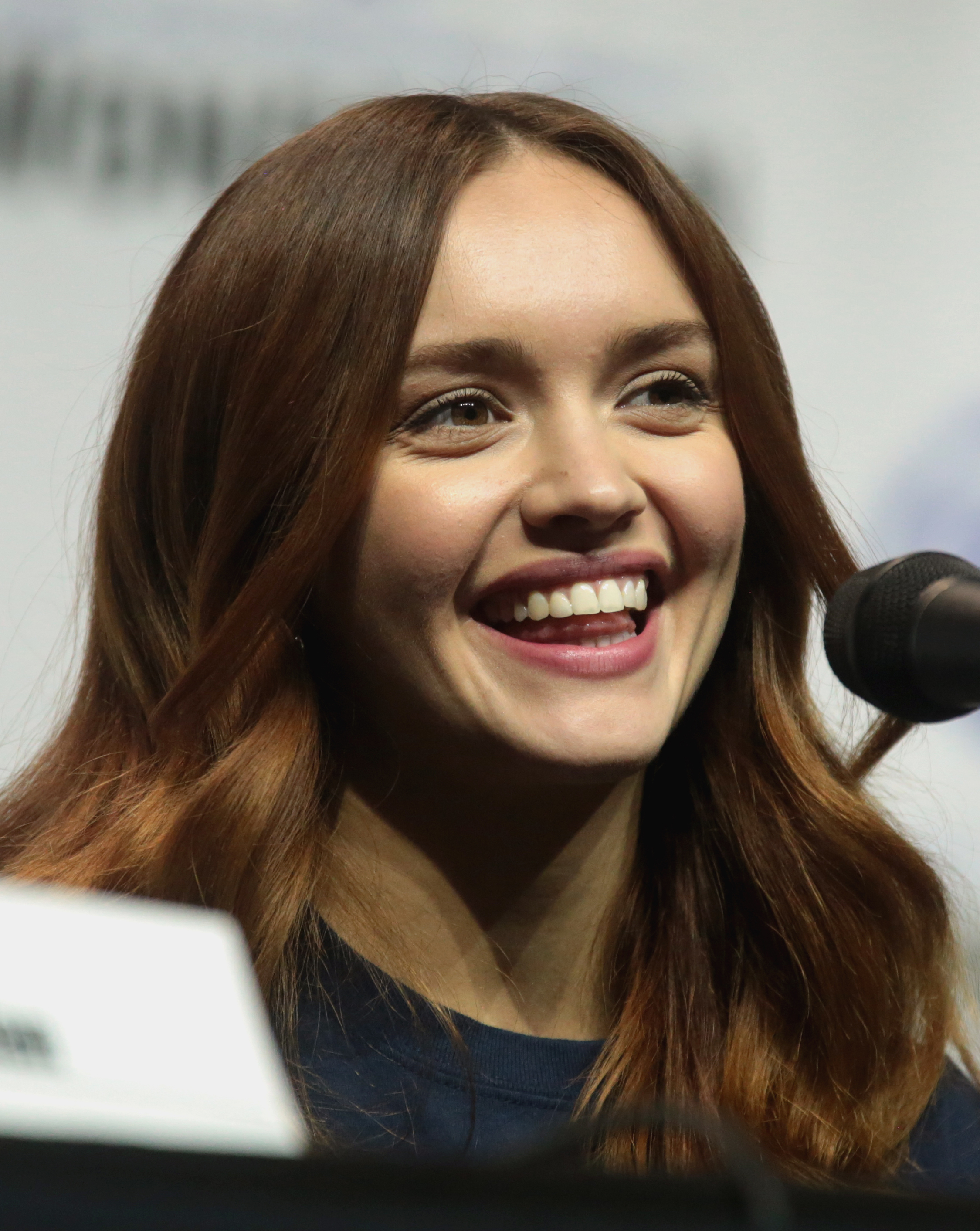
Olivia Cooke

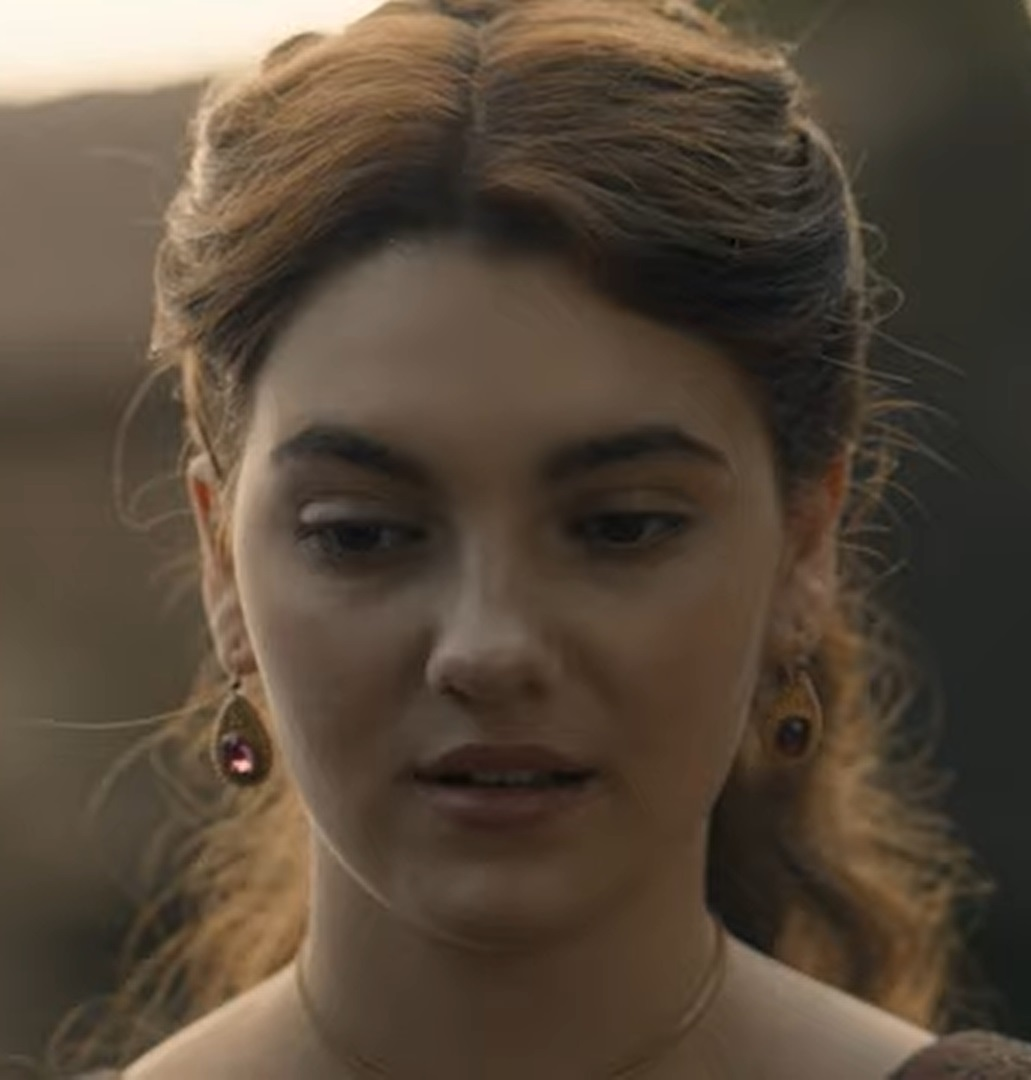
Emily Carey as young Alicent Hightower

Alicent Hightower (portrayed by Olivia Cooke as an adult and by Emily Carey as a teenager) is the daughter of Ser Otto Hightower, second wife of King Viserys I Targaryen, and mother of King Aegon II, Queen Helaena, Prince Aemond, and Prince Daeron Targaryen. She is also the childhood companion of Princess Rhaenyra Targaryen, with them having grown up together in the Red Keep. Following the death of Queen Aemma Arryn, Alicent's father pressures her to get close to the grieving Viserys. Viserys later goes against the advice of the Small Council and marries Alicent, who soon gives him a long-sought-after male heir with their son Aegon. When she overhears Otto and Viserys discussing Rhaenyra's exploits with Prince Daemon Targaryen, she confronts Rhaenyra privately, who denies the rumor, which begins to create a rift between them. Alicent is informed by Larys Strong that Grand Maester Mellos was ordered to discreetly deliver moon tea, which is used to abort pregnancies, to Rhaenyra, and questions Ser Criston Cole on the matter, who confesses that he broke his oath and slept with her. Feeling betrayed by her closest friend, Alicent surprises all the guests when she attends the royal wedding feast of Ser Laenor Velaryon and Rhaenyra by wearing a green dress that matches the colors of the flames House Hightower burns when they go to war. Ten years later, Alicent and Rhaenyra had become more distant, and she rejected Rhaenyra's proposal to marry Rhaenyra's eldest son, Prince Jacaerys, to Alicent's daughter Helaena due to Rhaenyra's children being bastards. She indirectly causes the deaths of Lord Lyonel Strong and Ser Harwin Strong when she mentions to Larys that she wanted her father to regain his position as Hand of the King. She attends the funeral of Lady Laena Velaryon at Driftmark, but following an altercation that results in Rhaenyra's second eldest son Prince Lucerys Velaryon partially blinding Alicent's son Aemond, Alicent attempts to have Lucerys' eye gouged out in return, and when refused, she wounds Rhaenyra. Six years later, on Viserys' deathbed, he mistakes Alicent for Rhaenyra and mutters parts of King Aegon the Conqueror's dream regarding the "Prince That Was Promised", which Alicent misinterprets as Viserys wanting their eldest son Aegon to succeed him as king instead of the chosen heir Rhaenyra. Following her husband's death, Alicent urges her father to help crown Aegon instead, and Otto reveals that he and the majority of the Small Council had been planning Aegon's succession for years. Appalled by this, she orders Larys to dismantle Mysaria's spy network, which Otto had been using to his advantage. When Otto travels to Dragonstone to request Rhaenyra's surrender and swear fealty to the newly crowned king Aegon, Alicent tries one final time to repair her friendship with Rhaenyra by sending a message with her father that only Rhaenyra would understand, but the death of Rhaenyra's son Lucerys soon ends any hope of a peaceful resolution.

In season 2, Alicent has begun a sexual relationship with Criston, whom she is sleeping with during the murder of her grandson Prince Jaehaerys Targaryen. She later attends the funeral procession of Jaehaerys and helps calm her daughter Helaena when she is on the verge of a panic attack due to her grief. While praying in the Grand Sept, she is visited by Rhaenyra, who had managed to sneak into the city to try and make peace. Rhaenyra informs Alicent that she has misinterpreted Viserys' final words regarding the "Prince That Was Promised", which led to her wanting to put Aegon on the throne. Alicent dismisses Rhaenyra's pleas and warns her that the war is inevitable now that Criston and his army are marching on the Crownlands. She requests that Grand Maester Orwyle discreetly bring her moon tea to prevent her from getting pregnant with Criston's child. Following the Battle at Rook's Rest, she visits Aegon and witnesses his grievous injuries. When selecting a regent to take over while Aegon recovers from his injuries sustained during the Battle at Rook's Rest, the majority of the Small Council advocates for Aemond over Alicent. After receiving no word from Lord Dalton Greyjoy, who was approached to fill the vacant position of Master of Ships, Alicent vehemently objects to Lord Jasper Wylde's proposal to have Alicent marry him. She is then forced to step down from her advisory position on the Small Council by Aemond after she continues to disagree with the rest of its members. She speaks with her brother, Ser Gwayne Hightower, about her youngest son Daeron, whom she hadn't seen for many years since he had become a ward of House Hightower. She later takes Helaena to the Grand Sept to pray for Aegon's recovery. After the smallfolk begin rioting in King's Landing when Rhaenyra sends shipments of food to the starving city, she and Helaena are forced to flee the Grand Sept with several Kingsguard and are quickly overrun by rioters until they are escorted to their carriage by Ser Rickard Thorne and flee the area. Feeling dismayed at her removal from the Small Council and the dangers present within King's Landing, she requests that Rickard escort her to the Kingswood so that she may be alone and away from the city for a while. While spending time with Helaena, Alicent becomes concerned for her daughter's mental state and asks if she wants to leave King's Landing. Alicent then stops Aemond from trying to force Helaena to join him on her dragon Dreamfyre and admonishes him for burning down Sharp Point in anger. With Orwyle's help, she leaves King's Landing with Rickard and goes to Dragonstone to confront Rhaenyra. Alicent admits her faults and the damage she has caused and agrees to leave King's Landing open for capture so Rhaenyra can end the war quickly. However, Rhaenyra refuses to allow Aegon to live, as his claim to the throne is what started the conflict, and forces Alicent to choose between peace and escalating the war. Alicent reluctantly agrees to her terms and is allowed to leave Dragonstone.

In season 3, upon her return to King's Landing, Alicent uncovers that Aegon has fled and that Aemond now seeks to claim the throne. She then urges him to seize Harrenhal using Vhagar, stating he is vulnerable in King's Landing; he then reluctantly agrees and kisses his mother before leaving. She forges a letter from Aemond and sends it to her cousin Lord Ormund Hightower to delay his army, laying the preparations for Rhaenyra to take King's Landing. Following the Battle of the Gullet, Alicent informs the commander of the City Watch, Ser Luthor Largent, of Rhaenyra's incoming arrival. When she returns to her chambers, Jasper Wylde attempts to sexually assault her, but she is saved by Orwyle. She asks Helaena to use her authority as the queen to demand that the Hightower soldiers not attack Rhaenyra when she arrives to claim King's Landing. She then takes her daughter and granddaughter and tries to flee the city. However, they are captured and brought to the throne room, find Rhaenyra on the Iron Throne, and that her father has been beheaded. Alicent and Helaena are subsequently locked in their chambers. After Ormund Hightower bends the knee and gives up "Daeron Targaryen", Rhaenyra informs Alicent that he is to be sent to the wall. When Alicent goes to meet her son, she does not recognize him, and the boy confesses that Ormund forced him to do it and bleached his hair silver. Alicent later discovers that Helaena is hiding that she is pregnant. After Alicent fails to convince Helaena to abort her pregnancy, she pays a maid to help them escape the Red Keep, but Mysaria catches them. Alicent then tries to convince her not to tell Rhaenyra of Helaena's pregnancy, offering to grant her a favor in return.

=== Harrold Westerling ===
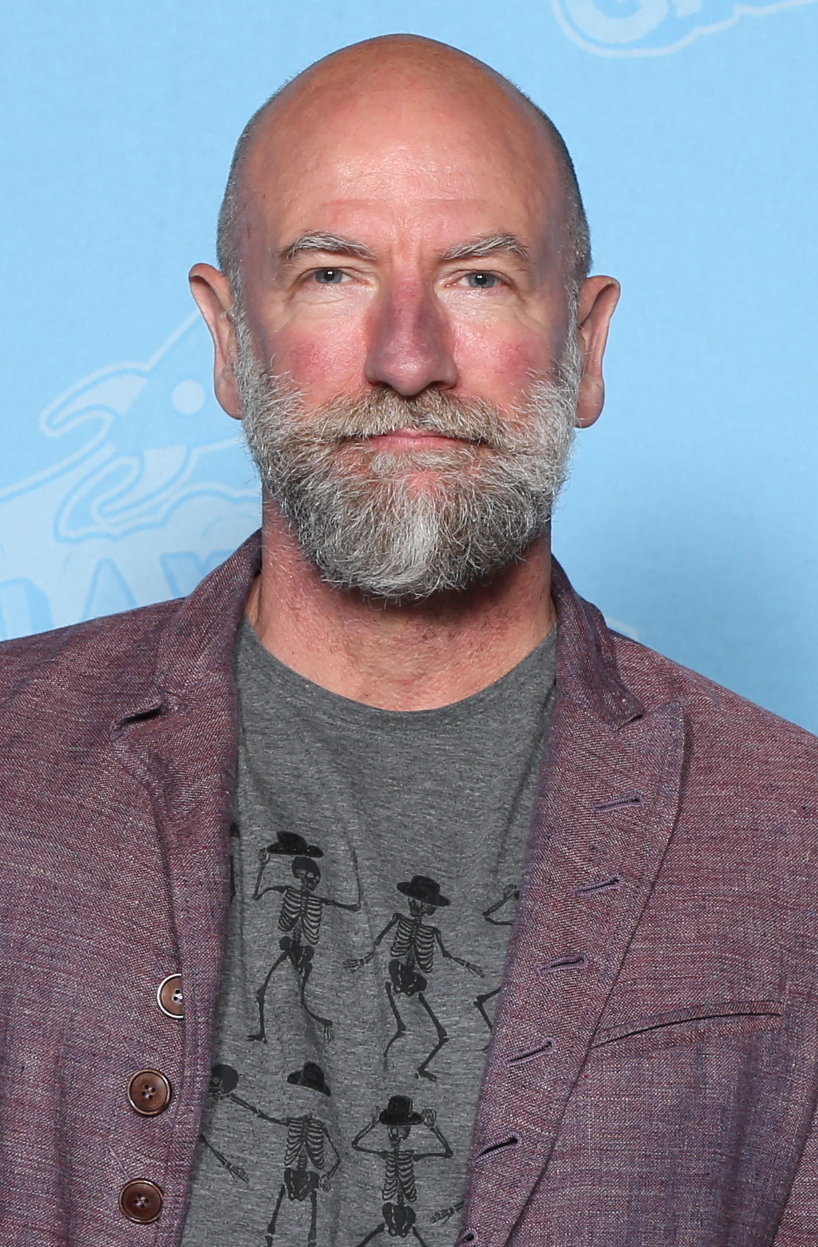
Graham McTavish

Harrold Westerling (portrayed by Graham McTavish) is a member of the Kingsguard under King Jaehaerys the Conciliator and King Viserys I. He is assigned as the royal protector of Princess Rhaenyra during her youth until he succeeds Ser Ryam Redwyne as the Lord Commander of the Kingsguard. Ten years later, following the funeral of Lady Laena Velaryon, he breaks up the fight between Prince Aemond and Prince Lucerys after the latter slashed Aemond's eye with a knife. Six years later, he witnesses the Small Council conspiring to crown Prince Aegon as king and resigns from the Kingsguard after refusing Otto Hightower's demand to go to Dragonstone and assassinate Rhaenyra.

=== Larys Strong ===
Larys Strong (portrayed by Matthew Needham), also known as the "Clubfoot" due to a birth defect, is the younger son of Lord Lyonel Strong who succeeds him as Lord of Harrenhal and head of House Strong of the Riverlands. He is appointed as the Lord Confessor of the Red Keep and later serves as the Master of Whisperers on the Small Council of King Aegon II Targaryen. He becomes a close confidant of Queen Alicent Hightower after he informs her that Princess Rhaenyra Targaryen had been discreetly given moon tea after her exploits with Prince Daemon Targaryen. Ten years later, he orchestrates the deaths of both his father and his older brother Ser Harwin Strong by sending his agents to trap them in a fire at his family seat of Harrenhal, allowing him to succeed his father as the Lord of Harrenhal and have Ser Otto Hightower regain his former position as Hand of the King. Six years later, following the death of King Viserys I Targaryen, Larys apprehends Lord Allun Caswell during his attempt to flee King's Landing and has him executed. He also works to dismantle Mysaria's spy network in King's Landing under Alicent's orders by rounding up and imprisoning all the household staff in the Red Keep, suspecting there to be traitors and spies among them.

In season 2, Larys has replaced Alicent's entire household staff, having tortured and executed them all, with new servants loyal to him taking their place. In the aftermath of the murder of Prince Jaehaerys Targaryen, Larys apprehends the City Watch guard Blood, who was attempting to flee King's Landing with Jaehaerys' severed head, and easily obtains information from Blood concerning his accomplice before Aegon kills Blood personally. Impressed with Larys' loyalty and efficiency, Aegon then appoints him to the previously retired position of Master of Whisperers. When Harrenhal is taken by Prince Daemon Targaryen, he reassures Aegon that he maintains the castle's treasury. When selecting a regent to take over while Aegon recovers from his injuries sustained during the Battle at Rook's Rest, he advocates for Aemond over Alicent. With Ser Criston Cole leaving King's Landing to lead an army into the Riverlands, Larys requests that he replace him as Hand of the King which Aemond rejects and requests that he send a message to Otto so he can return to King's Landing and take the position instead. Larys later visits Aegon and recounts his painful childhood as a cripple and tells Aegon to embrace his injuries and use them to his advantage. Due to his position, he is approached by Lord Jasper Wylde, who confides in Larys regarding a rumor that the dragon Seasmoke has been claimed, but he dismisses the rumor because it had been passed through word of mouth. Larys later informs Aegon that Rhaenyra had managed to find riders for three adult dragons and believed Aegon's life to be in danger, either from dragons besieging the city or Aemond killing him to take the throne. He urges Aegon to flee King's Landing to wait out the war while he recovers, with the hope that Rhaenyra and Aemond exhaust each other's forces. Aegon reluctantly agrees, and Larys flees King's Landing with him.

In season 3, after fleeing from King's Landing, Larys and Aegon are halted by men from House Staunton. Larys claims that they are men from the Citadel making their way to White Harbour. The men demand that they declare fealty to Queen Rhaenyra; however, Aegon refuses to do so. To save their lives, Larys reveals their identities and offers Aegon's crown as proof. On the road to Dragonstone, they are stopped when Triarchy soldiers kill their captors, allowing them to escape. Larys insists on travelling to Duskendale, but Aegon demands to travel to Rook's Rest. Larys continues to look out for Aegon, cautioning him from angering the smallfolk when they visit Sunfyre's body and stay in the Ruins of Rook's Rest. He convinces Janos that they were survivors from Sharp Point, and pays him to let them stay. He later gives Aegon a dressing down after he expresses his desire to find and kill Aemond. After Tyland Lannister discovers them, Larys begins working with Tyland so the three of them can find safe passage to Essos.

=== Jason Lannister ===
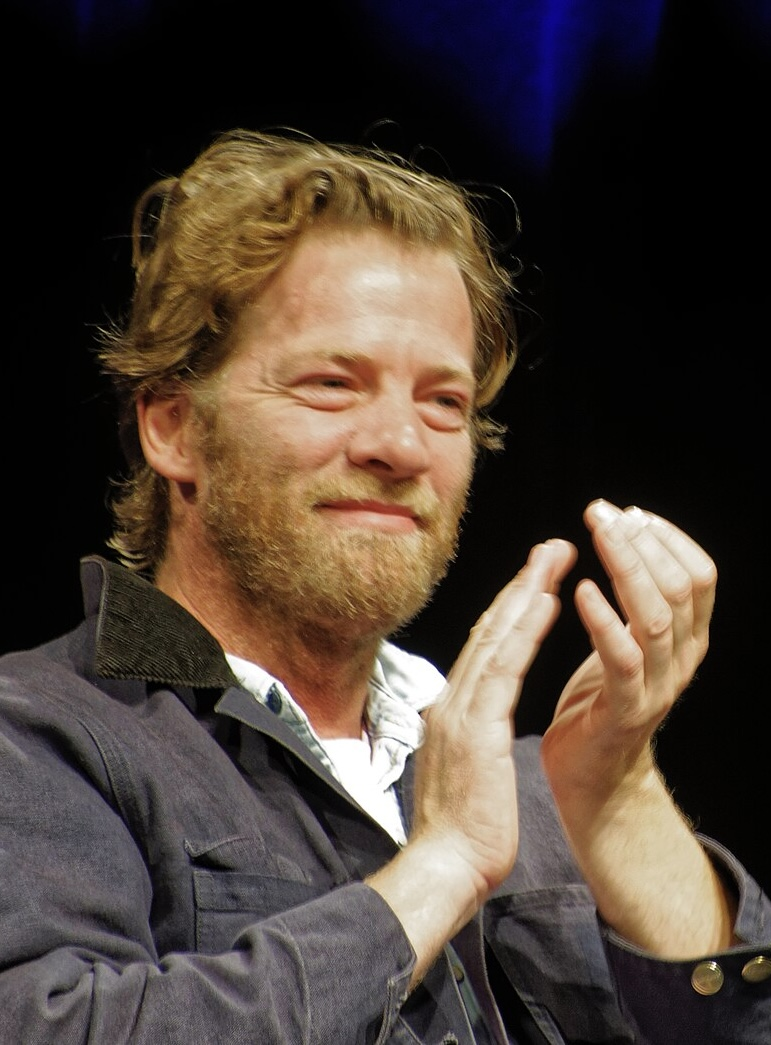
Jefferson Hall

Jason Lannister (portrayed by Jefferson Hall) is the son of Lady Ceira Lannister and the older twin brother of Ser Tyland Lannister. He is the Lord of Casterly Rock, head of House Lannister, and Warden of the West. An arrogant hunter and warrior, he unsuccessfully vies for the hand of Princess Rhaenyra Targaryen and takes part in the Royal Hunt during the second nameday celebrations for Prince Aegon Targaryen.

In season 2, Jason relays through his brother that House Lannister pledges its support to Aegon and musters the armies of the Westerlands to prepare for war. He later arrives with his army at the Golden Tooth and awaits to receive word from Prince Aemond Targaryen before he marches toward the Riverlands. He later marches into the Riverlands with his army, heading towards Harrenhal.

In season 3, Jason is killed off-screen by the Winter Wolves, and his severed head is presented to Daemon Targaryen by Lord Roderick Dustin after the Lannister army is defeated by Daemon's forces.

=== Tyland Lannister ===
Tyland Lannister (portrayed by Jefferson Hall) is the son of Lady Ceira Lannister and the younger twin brother of Lord Jason Lannister. He serves as the successor to Lord Corlys Velaryon as the Master of Ships on the Small Council of King Viserys I Targaryen and later switches positions when he succeeds Lord Lyman Beesbury as the Master of Coin on the Small Council of King Aegon II Targaryen. After the immediate death of Viserys, Tyland is revealed to be part of a scheme to crown Aegon as king and informs the rest of the Small Council that the treasury will be divided for safekeeping.

In season 2, Tyland is irritated by the young Prince Jaehaerys Targaryen's presence after Aegon brings him to a Small Council meeting. After the Battle of the Burning Mill, Tyland concludes that, despite the death of Lord Samwell Blackwood, both sides took heavy losses, and he urges Aegon to utilize his brother's forces that are being mustered in the Westerlands. When selecting a regent to take over while Aegon recovers from his injuries sustained during the Battle at Rook's Rest, he advocates for Aemond over Alicent. Due to the House Lannister and House Hightower fleets needing months to prepare before sailing to King's Landing, Aemond requests that Tyland form an alliance with the Triarchy and have them attack the Velaryon fleet blockading the gullet, which causes supplies to be cut off from the city. Tyland later arrives in the free city of Tyrosh and meets with representatives of the Triarchy, and reluctantly agrees that the crown will give them the Stepstones in exchange for their aid. He then proves himself and impresses Admiral Sharako Lohar, the commander of the Triarchy fleet, by mud-wrestling her, and she agrees to join him and bring her fleet to Westeros.

In season 3, Tyland participates in the Battle of the Gullet; however, he frequently disagrees with Lohar's strategies. When following Lord Corlys Velaryon through a rocky pass, Lohar pushes Tyland and his men overboard so her ship loses weight. After Rhaenyra takes King's Landing, during her first small council meeting, Orwyle informs them that the treasury has been depleted. He elaborates that Tyland divided it for safekeeping and only he knows where the gold is located. Corlys states that Tyland is presumed dead following the Battle of the Gullet, and Torrhen Manderly succeeds him as Master of Coin. Having survived, Tyland later joins the refugee camp at Rook's Rest and encounters Aegon and Larys Strong. He begins working with Larys so the three of them can find safe passage to Essos.

=== Jacaerys "Jace" Velaryon ===
Jacaerys "Jace" Velaryon (portrayed by Harry Collett as a teenager and by Leo Hart as a young child) is the eldest son of Queen Rhaenyra Targaryen, his legal father Ser Laenor Velaryon, and his biological father Ser Harwin Strong. He is a dragonrider who is bonded to the dragon Vermax. He is betrothed to his cousin Lady Baela Targaryen who together would act as the joint heirs to Rhaenyra and her claim to the Iron Throne once married. Following the death of King Viserys I Targaryen, Jacaerys is sent as an envoy to House Arryn and House Stark to ensure that they keep their oaths to support his mother's claim.

In season 2, Jace managed to confirm the loyalty of House Arryn before visiting the Wall with Lord Cregan Stark, who also promises to uphold his father's oath. While there, he receives word of his brother Prince Lucerys Velaryon's death and returns to Dragonstone to attend his funeral. After he becomes upset that his mother refuses to allow him to fly into battle with Vermax, as her heir, Rhaenyra informs him of Aegon the Conqueror's dream regarding the "Prince That Was Promised". Following the Battle at Rook's Rest, Jace travels to the Twins and secures the allegiance of House Frey, without his mother's knowledge. When he returns to Dragonstone, Jace proposes that they find dragonriders for the unclaimed adult dragons Vermithor and Silverwing and that they could search for distant Targaryen relatives to claim them. Jace discovers that the Queensguard Ser Steffon Darklyn has a distant Targaryen relative and joins his mother when they witness Steffon unsuccessfully try to bond with the dragon Seasmoke and be burned alive. After Seasmoke is claimed by Addam of Hull, Jace objects to allowing anyone lowborn to claim dragons, believing that it would question his own legitimacy. He privately berates his mother for her relationship with Harwin, as other Targaryen bastards could threaten his position as her heir due to him being a bastard as well. Jace confronts the new dragonriders Hugh Hammer and Ulf White, with the latter acting rude toward him and insinuating that he and Jace are comparable as they are both bastards. He berates Ulf and forces him to apologize and later continues to demand respect from Ulf during a feast with the other dragonriders.

In season 3, after learning that the Triarchy had engaged the Velaryon fleet at sea during the Battle of the Gullet, he has Lorent Marbrand confine his mother to her quarters to stop her from riding into battle. Jace then takes Vermax to aid the Velaryon fleet during the Battle of the Gullet alongside Baela on Moondancer. The Triarchy ships attempt to shoot Vermax down, and he becomes injured. When Baela is attacked by Sheepstealer, Jace comes to her defence, leading to Vermax being shot by a scorpion bolt and falling into the sea. Jace then frees himself from his dragon's saddle as Vermax drowns. After reaching the surface, Jace is struck by multiple arrows fired by Triarchy archers and dies. His corpse is later recovered by Baela and brought back to Dragonstone, where Rhaenyra mourns her eldest son. After Rhaenyra takes King's Landing, she has a brief vision of her son.

=== Aegon II Targaryen ===
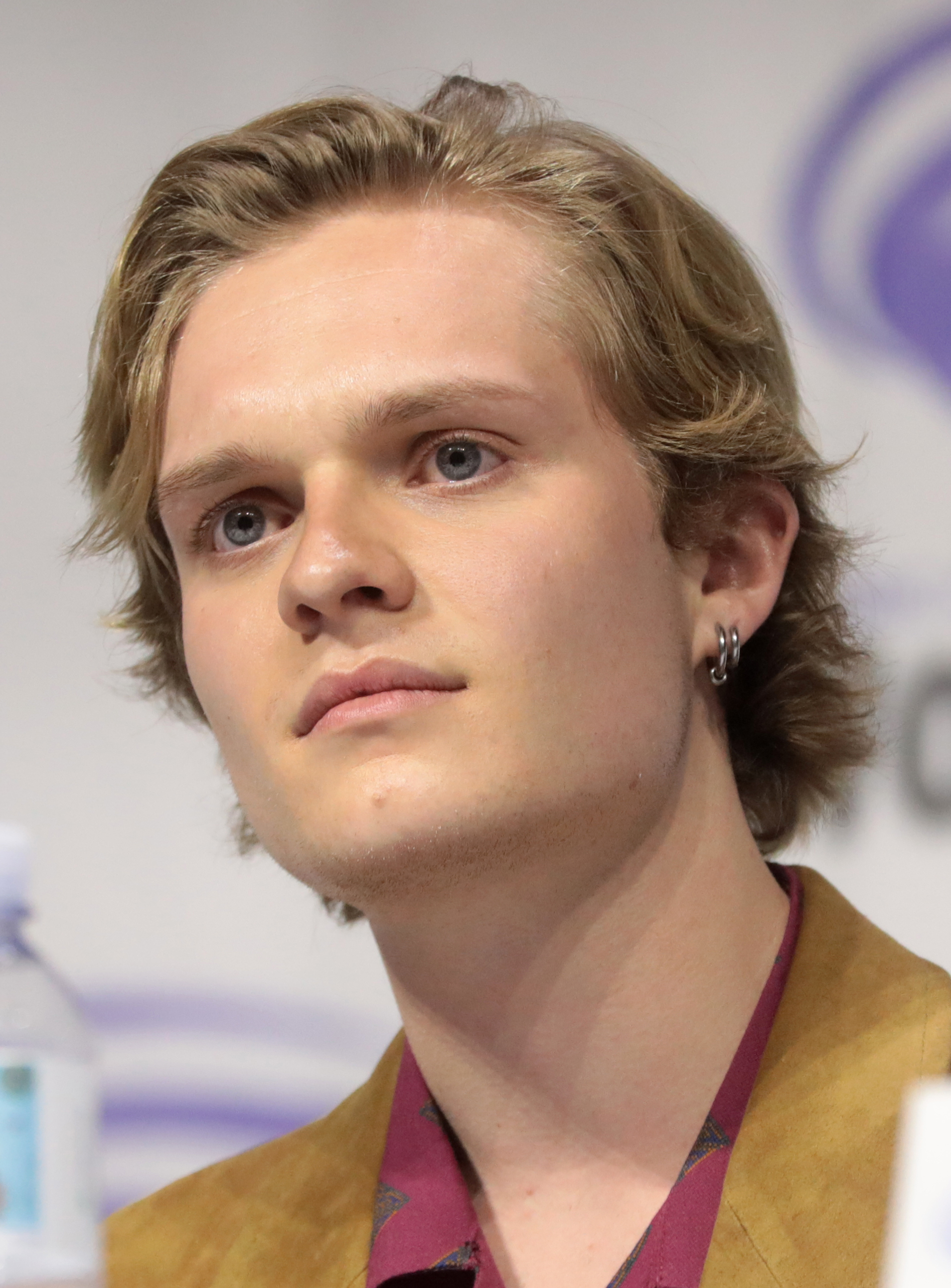
Tom Glynn-Carney

Aegon II Targaryen (portrayed by Tom Glynn-Carney as an adult and by Ty Tennant as a teenager) is the sixth King of the Seven Kingdoms. He is the eldest son of King Viserys I Targaryen and Queen Alicent Hightower, husband to his sister-wife Queen Helaena Targaryen, and father of Prince Jaehaerys Targaryen and Princess Jaehaera Targaryen. He is a dragonrider who is bonded to the dragon Sunfyre. As he grew into adulthood, Aegon's hedonism and depravity became legendary in King's Landing's Street of Silk, with him having fathered at least one bastard child. Following the death of his father, despite his own belief that he is unfit to rule and that his half-sister Princess Rhaenyra Targaryen was the chosen heir, he was crowned king with the support of the Small Council, ultimately usurping the throne.

In season 2, Aegon brings his heir Jaehaerys to a Small Council meeting and humiliates Ser Tyland Lannister. He initially strives to be a benevolent king, but Ser Otto Hightower, the Hand of the King, urges him to be tough on the smallfolk to secure resources for the impending war. Following the brutal murder of his son, Aegon demands immediate retaliation against Rhaenyra and those who support her. He later personally kills one of his son's killers and orders the public hanging of every ratcatcher in the Red Keep, one of whom was an accomplice in Jaehaerys' death. This infuriates Otto, who Aegon subsequently dismisses as Hand of the King and appoints Ser Criston Cole as his replacement. Following the Battle of the Burning Mill, Aegon supports Criston's plan to take an army into the Crownlands to subjugate the houses that have allied with Rhaenyra. Despite Aegon wanting to go into battle himself with Sunfyre, Lord Larys Strong convinces him otherwise, and impressed with his loyalty, Aegon appoints him to the previously retired position of Master of Whisperers. Seeking to prove himself a strong ruler, Aegon takes Sunfyre to join in the Battle at Rook's Rest despite protests from his family and the Small Council. He attacks Princess Rhaenys Targaryen and her dragon Meleys, but after the arrival of Aemond and his dragon Vhagar, Sunfyre is severely wounded by Meleys and then badly burned when Vhagar engulfs them in flame, sending Aegon and Sunfyre tumbling to the ground. In the aftermath of the battle, Aegon survived the fall but fell unconscious, having broken several bones, and half of his body was burnt after Vhagar's fire heated his Valyrian steel armor and melted his skin. After he returned to King's Landing, Grand Maester Orwyle attended to his injuries, and Aemond was named regent while he recovered. Aegon eventually awakens from his coma and is visited by Aemond, who interrogates Aegon about the Battle at Rook's Rest, but he claims to not remember anything. Larys later visits Aegon and tells him to embrace his injuries and use them to his advantage, as his enemies will underestimate him. Under Larys's insistence, Orwyle pushes Aegon harder to try and start walking again, despite his broken leg. Larys later informs Aegon that Rhaenyra had managed to find riders for three adult dragons and that Aemond may try and kill him to take the throne. Aegon bitterly remarks that he believes Sunfyre is dead, and agrees to flee King's Landing with Larys, intent on waiting out the oncoming conflict.

In season 3, after fleeing from King's Landing, Larys and Aegon are halted by men from House Staunton. Larys claims that they are men from the Citadel making their way to White Harbour. The men demand that they declare fealty to Queen Rhaenyra; however, Aegon refuses to do so. To save their lives, Larys reveals their identities and offers Aegon's crown as proof. On the road to Dragonstone, they are stopped when Triarchy soldiers kill their captors, with Aegon killing one himself, allowing them to escape. Larys insists on travelling to Duskendale, but Aegon demands to travel to Rook's Rest. He eventually finds Sunfyre's body and claims he can hear Sunfyre breathing, even though the dragon had been motionless for several weeks. They then reach the ruins of Rook's Rest, where Aegon is forced to clean latrines by Janos and kiss his boots after Aegon protests the lack of food. Aegon blames his situation on his jealousy toward his brother Aemond and plans to find and kill him, but after Larys gives him a dressing down, he relents. He later stabs Janos to death after he discovers Aegon's crown, to keep his own identity safe.

=== Aemond Targaryen ===
Aemond Targaryen (portrayed by Ewan Mitchell as an adult and by Leo Ashton as a young child), also known as "Aemond One-Eye", is the third child of King Viserys I Targaryen and Queen Alicent Hightower. Following the funeral of Lady Laena Velaryon, he becomes a dragonrider after claiming her dragon Vhagar. This causes an altercation with his cousins/nephews during which Prince Lucerys Velaryon slashes Aemond's eye with a knife, partially blinding him. Six years later, following his father's death, Aemond is sent as an envoy to House Baratheon and arranges a political alliance with Lord Borros Baratheon through marriage with one of his daughters. After Lucerys arrives with his dragon Arrax, due to the new alliance forged with Aemond, Borros refuses to uphold his father's oath to support Queen Rhaenyra Targaryen's claim to the Iron Throne. After Lucerys leaves, Aemond pursues him on Vhagar, but Vhagar disobeys Aemond's commands and attacks Lucerys and Arrax, killing them both.

In season 2, Prince Daemon Targaryen attempts to have Aemond assassinated in revenge for Lucerys' death, but Aemond's nephew Prince Jaehaerys Targaryen is killed instead, as Aemond was visiting a brothel. Aemond expresses regret concerning his part in Lucerys' death to the brothel madam Sylvi, concerned that it's his fault that they were on the verge of war. Following the Battle of the Burning Mill, Aemond supports Ser Criston Cole's proposal of subjugating the houses in the Crownlands that have allied with Rhaenyra. When Aegon and his retinue take a new squire to Sylvi's brothel to lose his virginity, he encounters Aemond with Sylvi and jeers at his brother until Aemond leaves. He partakes in the Battle at Rook's Rest with Vhagar as part of a plan to lure a dragon to defend the castle while it's under siege and ambush them. After Princess Rhaenys Targaryen arrives with Meleys, Aemond holds off the plan when Aegon arrives with Sunfyre. He soon joins the battle and witnesses Meleys grappling with Sunfyre and commands Vhagar to attack both Meleys and Sunfyre, engulfing the latter in flame, which sends Aegon and Sunfyre tumbling to the ground. Aemond then engages Rhaenys, but despite her initially getting the upper hand, Vhagar ambushes and crushes Meleys' neck, killing her and sending Rhaenys plummeting to her death as they crash onto Rook's Rest. Aemond is later found by Criston standing over his brother's unconscious body, after finding him severely wounded. After returning to King's Landing, Aemond is made regent by the Small Council while Aegon recovers from his injuries, and he quickly orders the closing of the city to stop fear spreading among the smallfolk due to the blockade on King's Landing. He later becomes enraged when Lord Jason Lannister refuses to march his army into the Riverlands unless Aemond and Vhagar join him and decides to send Ser Tyland Lannister away to ally with the Triarchy. He also forces Alicent to step down from her advisory position on the Small Council after she continues to disagree with the rest of its members. After he is informed that Aegon has awoken from his coma, Aemond goes to confront him and questions whether he remembers anything about the Battle at Rook's Rest, but Aegon denies remembering how he received his injuries. After he witnesses the dragon Silverwing flying above King's Landing with a new rider, he rushes to fetch Vhagar. He then chases Silverwing to Dragonstone, but after witnessing Rhaenyra with her dragon Syrax alongside Verimithor and his new rider, Aemond quickly retreats, not wanting to take on three adult dragons at once. In his anger, Aemond burns down Sharp Point, the seat of House Bar Emmon, who are pledged to Rhaenyra. He pressures Helaena to ride Dreamfyre into battle, and after Helaena refuses, he attempts to force her, only for Alicent to stop him and admonish him for his actions. Aemond later confronts Helaena once again and threatens to kill her if she doesn't join him, but Helaena rebuffs him by stating how she saw Aemond cause Aegon's injuries in a vision and that Aemond will die during the war's end.

In season 3, after Aegon flees King's Landing, Aemond claims the title of King, believing his brother had abdicated. When Alicent returns to King's Landing, he questions his mother about her whereabouts. Alicent urges him to seize Harrenhal using Vhagar, stating that he is vulnerable in King’s Landing. He reluctantly agrees and kisses his mother before leaving. When he arrives at Harrenhal, he slaughters the remaining men stationed there. He then kills Ser Simon Strong and his sons after challenging them to a duel, even though they refuse. He is left wounded after Paxter Strong stabs him from behind, and begs Alys Rivers for help. Alys helps Aemond recover by tending to his wounds. When bounty hunters arrive to claim Aemond, he defends Alys and kills them all.

=== Baela Targaryen ===
Baela Targaryen (portrayed by Bethany Antonia as a teenager and by Shani Smethurst as a young child) is the elder daughter of Prince Daemon Targaryen and Lady Laena Velaryon. She is a dragonrider who is bonded to the dragon Moondancer. Following her mother's death, Baela becomes the ward of her grandmother Princess Rhaenys Targaryen. Six years later, she is betrothed to her cousin Prince Jacaerys Velaryon, which would make her the future queen consort once married, as Jace is Rhaenyra's heir.

In season 2, Rhaenyra sends Baela and Moondancer to keep watch on King's Landing in anticipation of any future attacks. Baela later discovers Ser Criston Cole and Ser Gwayne Hightower leading an army into the Crownlands and reports their movements to the Black Council, allowing the lords whose houses reside on the mainland to better prepare for an attack. Following the death of her grandmother, Baela is sent by Rhaenyra to offer her grandfather, Lord Corlys Velaryon, the position of Hand to the Queen. With his wife and children dead, Corlys asks Baela to be the heir to Driftmark, but she refuses, stating that she is more Targaryen than Velaryon. Baela later comforts Jacaerys, who expresses how he feels unworthy of being Rhaenyra's heir after lowborn bastards claim dragons in the Red Sowing. She assures him that she doesn't care about his parentage and convinces Jace to take part in a feast in honor of the dragonseeds, to show them his authority. She attends the feast at Dragonstone with the other dragonriders and expresses how concerned she is about sending their dragons to attack the opposing cities of Oldtown and Lannisport, not wanting to harm any innocents.

In season 3, Baela takes Moondancer to aid the Velaryon fleet during the Battle of the Gullet alongside Jace on Vermax. During the battle, she is attacked by Sheepstealer, leading to Jace coming to her defence and being killed by the Triarchy alongside Vermax. After the battle, Baela recovers Jace's body and takes him back to Dragonstone. She is then sent to scout the Riverlands and Crownlands alongside Addam to find both Vhagar and Sheepstealer. They find evidence of Vhagar in Wendish Town, but discover that she is long gone.

=== Rhaena Targaryen ===
Rhaena Targaryen (portrayed by Phoebe Campbell as a teenager and by Eva Ossei-Gerning as a young child) is the younger daughter of Prince Daemon Targaryen and Lady Laena Velaryon. Unlike her sister and cousins, her dragon egg did not hatch. Although she previously attempted to bond with the unclaimed dragons on Dragonstone, she was unsuccessful and nearly killed, leaving her without a dragon. She later bonds with the wild dragon Sheepstealer. She is betrothed to her cousin Prince Lucerys Velaryon, who together would have acted as the joint heirs to Driftmark once married until Lucerys' death prevents this from proceeding.

In season 2, she attends Lucerys' funeral and grieves her former betrothed. After the assassination attempt on Queen Rhaenyra Targaryen, she requests Rhaena to take care of her younger children, Prince Joffrey Velaryon, Prince Aegon "the Younger", and Prince Viserys Targaryen, and stay with them at the Eyrie to be under Lady Jeyne Arryn's protection. Rhaenyra also sends the dragon hatchlings Tyraxes and Stormcloud with her, as well as four dragon eggs, which include Viserys' chosen egg and a clutch laid by Syrax, so that Rhaena can protect the future of House Targaryen. After arriving at the Eyrie, Jeyne expresses her displeasure at Rhaena having brought two dragon hatchlings with her instead of an adult dragon to defend the Vale. While taking a walk through the countryside with Joffrey, she discovers the remains of a dragon's feeding ground. She later confronts Jeyne about the existence of a wild dragon in the Vale, who confirms her suspicions. Jeyne also informs Rhaena that she is to leave the Vale on the merchant ship the Gay Abandon with Aegon "the Younger" and Viserys so they can be sheltered by Prince Reggio Haratis in Pentos. After Rhaena is forced to leave the Eyrie along with Aegon "the Younger" and Viserys, she leaves her half-brothers to track down the wild dragon. After searching for some time, she finally comes across the dragon Sheepstealer and confronts him.

In season 3, she mounts Sheepstealer and quickly bonds with him. She then rides him to the Crownlands and takes part in the Battle of the Gullet, but she struggles to control him, as Sheepstealer starts attacking both Velaryon and Triarchy ships, and even her own sister on Moondancer, leading to Jace coming to Baela's defence and being killed by the Triarchy alongside Vermax. Feeling guilty, Rhaena goes to Jeyne Arryn seeking asylum and offers to protect the Vale with Sheepstealer. She then lives in a cave with her dragon, until Daemon discovers her. He tries to convince his daughter to come with him to King's Landing, but Rhaena ignores her father's pleas and flees on Sheepstealer. Rhaena later searches for Vhagar in an attempt to set things right, but is spotted by Addam and Baela, who tell Rhaenyra that Sheepstealer's rider is still alive. Daemon gets to Rhaena first and urges her to flee, but they are interrupted by Addam and Rhaenyra, who is shocked that Rhaena is the one who got her son killed, furiously chastising Daemon for keeping this from her. A fight breaks out between Syrax, Seasmoke, Caraxes, and Sheepstealer, during which Sheepstealer is badly injured to Rhaena's horror. Rhaena is taken back to King's Landing and confined to her room by Rhaenyra. She is later comforted by Baela, who forgives her for her role in Jace's death.

=== Helaena Targaryen ===
Helaena Targaryen (portrayed by Phia Saban as an adult and by Evie Allen as a young child) is the second child of King Viserys I Targaryen and Queen Alicent Hightower, the sister-wife of King Aegon II Targaryen, and mother of Jaehaerys Targaryen and Jaehaera Targaryen. She is a dragonrider who is bonded to the dragon Dreamfyre. She has a unique interest in bugs and seems to make cryptic prophecies of the future. Helaena predicts her brother Prince Aemond Targaryen claiming the dragon Vhagar and losing his eye, and Princess Rhaenys Targaryen's escape from King's Landing among other predictions.

In season 2, after her uncle Prince Daemon Targaryen hires Blood and Cheese to infiltrate the Red Keep, they force Helaena to tell them which of her children is a boy, as they are fraternal twins who look identical. She reluctantly gives up her son who is subsequently murdered before she escapes with her daughter. She attends the funeral procession of Jaehaerys with her mother but becomes overwhelmed and on the verge of a panic attack as she grieves her son. She later goes with Alicent to the Grand Sept to pray for Aegon's recovery following the injuries he sustained during the Battle at Rook's Rest. After the smallfolk begin rioting in King's Landing when Queen Rhaenyra Targaryen sends shipments of food to the starving city, she and Alicent are forced to flee the Grand Sept with several Kingsguard and are quickly overrun by rioters until they are escorted to their carriage by Ser Rickard Thorne and flee the area. While spending time with her mother, Helaena expresses that she doesn't understand why the smallfolk hate them and how she hasn't been happy since becoming queen. With Rhaenyra having found riders for three adult dragons, Aemond then tries to force Helaena to join him on her dragon Dreamfrye. She expresses that she doesn't want to hurt anyone, but Aemond tries to force her until Alicent stops him and expresses her concern regarding Helaena's mental state. During a vision, Helaena talks to Prince Daemon Targaryen, stating that he has a part to play in deciding the future. Aemond confronts Helaena once again and threatens her life, but Helaena rebuffs him by stating how she saw Aemond cause Aegon's injuries in a vision and that Aemond will die during the war.

In season 3, Alicent asks Helaena to use her authority as the queen to demand that the Hightower soldiers not attack Rhaenyra when she arrives to claim King's Landing. She then takes Helaena and Jaehaera and tries to flee the city with them. However, they are captured and returned to the Red Keep. Alicent and Helaena are subsequently locked in their chambers and are only allowed to see Jaehaera every few days. Helaena later learns that she is pregnant, and unsuccessfully attempts to hide it from Alicent. When Alicent attempts to force Helaena to abort her pregnancy, Helaena is insulted and refuses despite the danger her child would pose to Rhaenyra's rule. She begins to disagree and argue with her mother, wanting to leave the Red Keep and escape their confinement. Alicent attempts to escape with her, but they are quickly caught by Mysaria. Helaena later refuses to eat, and so Rhaenyra has her force-fed. She then jumps from the window of her chambers to her death.

=== Orwyle ===
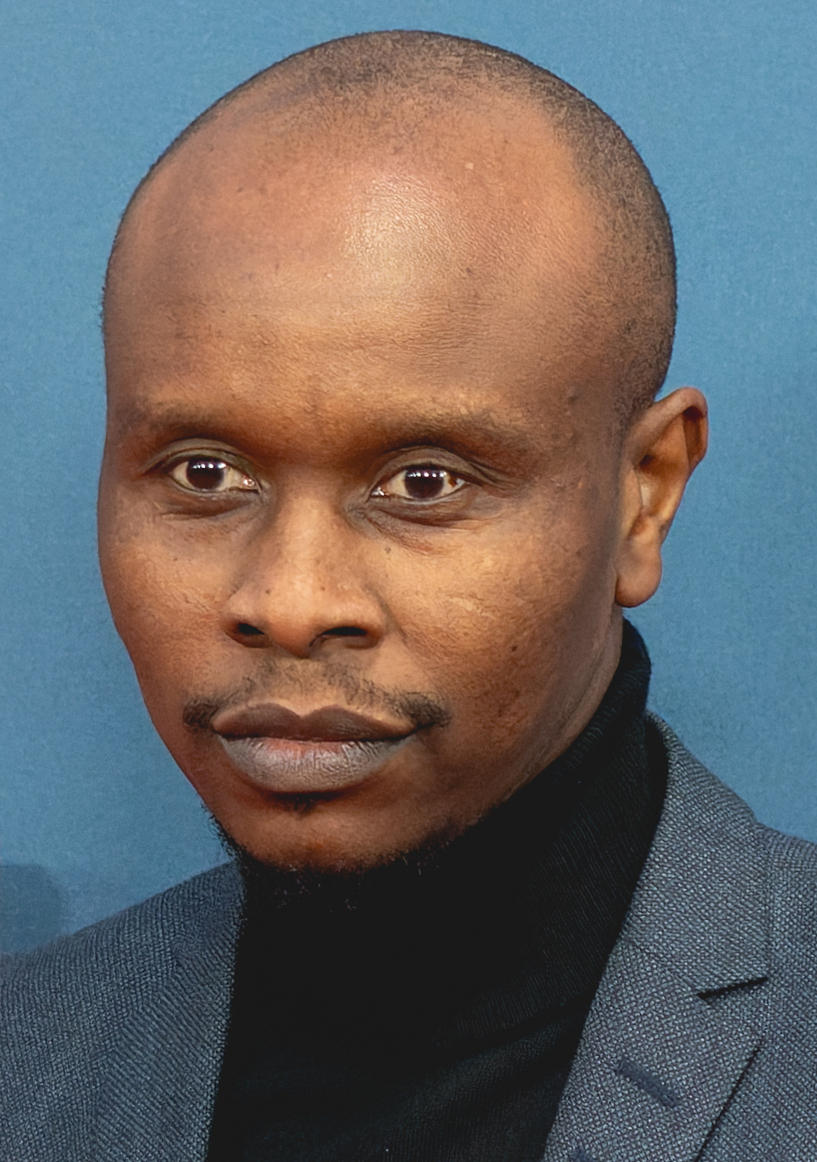
Kurt Egyiawan

Orwyle (portrayed by Kurt Egyiawan) is the Grand Maester on the Small Council of King Viserys I, King Aegon II, and Queen Rhaenyra Targaryen. Before serving as Grand Maester, he assists Mellos in treating an ailing Viserys, ultimately suggesting better methods of treatment despite his lesser experience. Sixteen years later, after the immediate death of Viserys, Orwyle is revealed to be part of a scheme to crown Aegon as king, and advocates for the murder of Princess Rhaenyra to eliminate the rival claimant. He also joins Ser Otto Hightower when they travel to Dragonstone in an attempt to convince Rhaenyra to surrender peacefully.

In season 2, Orwyle suggests offering the vacant position of Master of Ships to Lord Dalton Greyjoy, so they can use the Iron Fleet to match the dominant Velaryon Fleet. After the Battle of the Burning Mill, Orwyle suggests ordering the elderly Lord Grover Tully to seize control over the houses sworn to him in the Riverlands, but the notion is dismissed by Lord Jasper Wylde. He discreetly delivers moon tea to Queen Alicent Hightower, who questions him regarding whether he believes Viserys changed his mind and chose Aegon to be king, but refuses to comment. Following the Battle at Rook's Rest, Orwyle personally attends to Aegon's injuries after he is returned to King's Landing. When selecting a regent to take over while Aegon recovers, Orwyle is the only member of the Small Council who advocates for Alicent. Orwyle later reports to the Small Council that Aegon has regained consciousness and informs Alicent that House Beesbury had pledged their allegiance to Rhaenyra and were fighting against House Hightower. At the insistence of Lord Larys Strong, Orwyle pushes Aegon harder to try and start walking again, despite his broken leg. Orwyle later discreetly assists Alicent in arranging transport to Dragonstone so she can meet with Rhaenyra.

In season 3, after Aegon flees King's Landing, Aemond accuses Orwyle of helping him escape and is about to promptly behead him when Jasper intervenes by informing them that Larys has also disappeared, saving his life. When Alicent begins to make preparations for Rhaenyra to take King's Landing, Orwyle arrests Jasper Wylde after he attempts to assault the queen, and then later gives him to Daemon in exchange for his own life. During Rhaenyra's first small council meeting, Orwyle informs them that the treasury has been depleted, and that Tyland Lannister had it divided for safekeeping. Rhaenyra allows Orwyle to remain on the Small Council, but has Mysaria monitor him. When Rhaenyra privately raises the issue of the High Septon refusing to anoint her with sacred oils so that she may be crowned queen, he suggests assassination instead of having him removed, but cautions her against antagonizing the Faith. Orwyle brings Alicent moon tea so Helaena can abort her pregnancy, but states that he can no longer help Alicent now that he serves Rhaenyra.

=== Hugh Hammer ===
Hugh Hammer (portrayed by Kieran Bew) is a bastard son of Princess Saera Targaryen, the ninth-born child of King Jaehaerys the Conciliator, making him a dragonseed. He is the husband of Kat and the father of their daughter. He becomes a dragonrider after bonding with the dragon Vermithor. As a blacksmith from King's Landing, Hugh is commissioned by the Crown to manufacture scorpion ballista to defend King's Landing from potential dragon attacks. Needing money to care for his sick daughter, he petitions King Aegon II to ask for payment in advance for his work, which Aegon approves. After Hugh witnesses the head of the dragon Meleys being paraded through King's Landing, he is later convinced by Kat that they must abandon the city and relocate to Tumbleton in fear of the escalating war. As they go to leave the city with their sick daughter, the gates are closed on Prince Aemond's orders. After the smallfolk begin rioting in King's Landing when Rhaenyra Targaryen sends shipments of food to the starving city, Hugh fights for a bag of food to bring back to his wife and daughter. After their daughter later succumbs to her illness, Hugh learns that Rhaenyra is seeking Targaryen bastards in an attempt to find new dragonriders and departs for Dragonstone. During the Red Sowing, he witnesses Vermithor massacring dozens of other dragonseeds and dodges dragonfire until he finally confronts Vermithor and manages to bond with and claim the dragon. Following the Red Sowing, he and Ulf White are brought onto Dragonstone, where Hugh tries to act respectfully during a feast with the other dragonriders, and Rhaenyra promises him a knighthood if they win the war.

In season 3, the Dragonseeds are sent to Harrenhal to ambush Aemond Targaryen when he arrives. However, after three days of waiting, they are warned by Alys Rivers of the Battle of the Gullet, and they leave to assist in the battle. Prince Daemon Targaryen scolds them for disobeying orders. Alongside Rhaenyra, Daemon, and Ulf, Hugh helps take King's Landing and is present when Daemon forces Ormund Hightower to submit. Hugh is later knighted by Daemon in the Red Keep and asks for his name to be styled "Hammer", after his trade as a blacksmith. He asks Rhaenyra what sort of living he should expect for himself and his wife, who has since moved to Tumbleton. She states that in time they will be granted a house on Visenya's Hill. When Lord Ormund Hightower's army seizes Tumbleton, he offers to observe the town so he can check on his wife. During one of his watch duties, Hugh sneaks into Tumbleton and finds Kat, urging her to leave so that they can be together again, but she angrily rejects him. During the Battle of Tumbleton, Hugh abandons his post in King's Landing to search the town for his wife, only to be devastated when he finds her dead.

=== Alyn of Hull ===
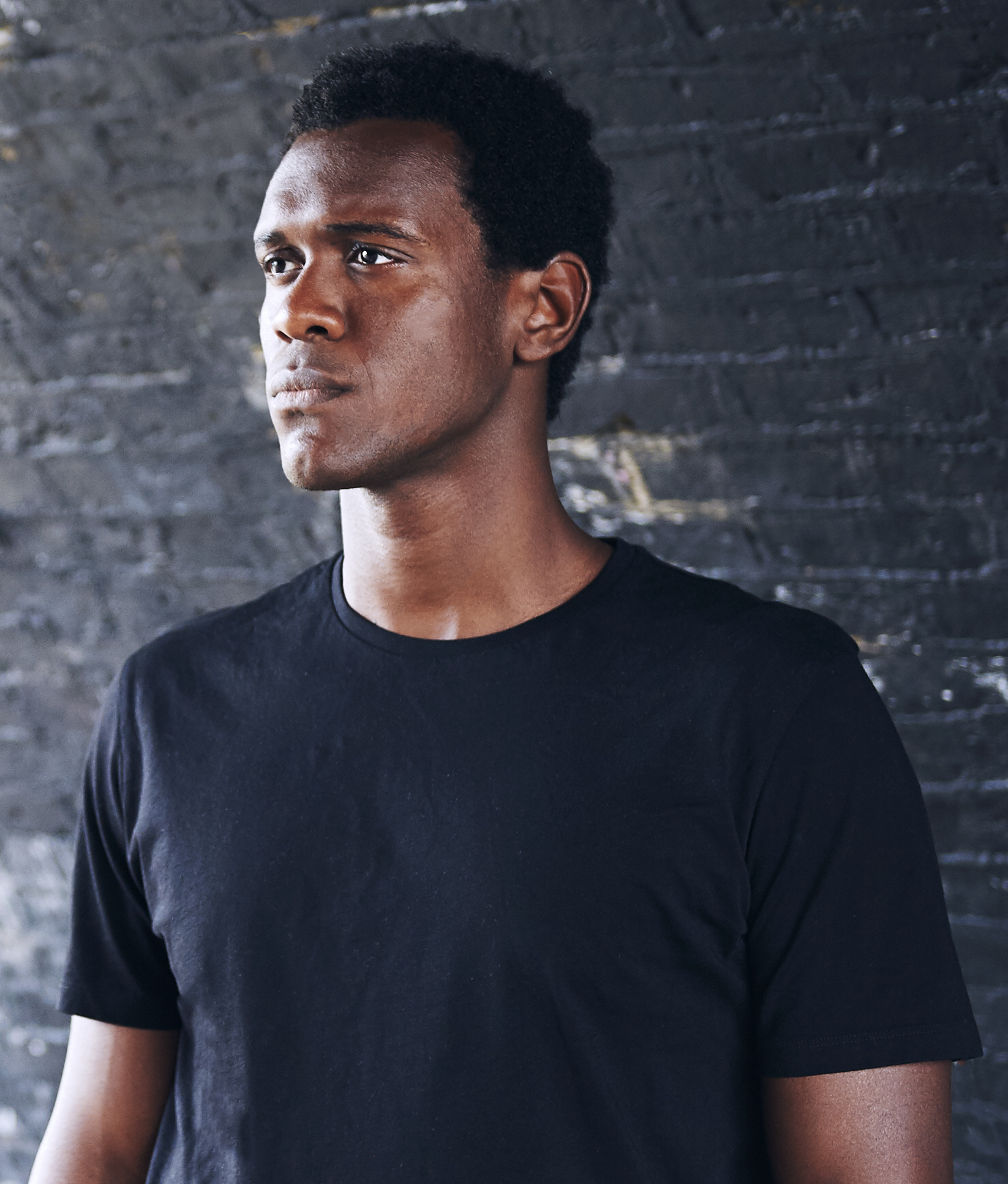
Abubakar Salim

Alyn of Hull (portrayed by Abubakar Salim) is a bastard son of Lord Corlys Velaryon, making him a dragonseed, and the older brother of Addam of Hull. He is a sailor in the Velaryon fleet and saved Corlys' life during the War for the Stepstones. When Corlys oversees the repairs of the flagship of the Velaryon fleet, the Sea Snake, he encounters Alyn and thanks him for saving his life. He soon reunites with his brother after months apart and is later confronted by Princess Rhaenys Targaryen who claims to know Alyn's parentage. Corlys names Alyn as his first mate of the Sea Snake despite Alyn's reluctance, who feels rejected by his father and keeps his head shaved to hide his Valyrian hair. After Corlys informs Alyn that his brother claimed Seasmoke, he asks if Alyn would also like to attempt to claim a dragon, but he instead declines. Corlys then tasks Alyn with helping ferry dozens of potential Targaryen bastards from King's Landing to Dragonstone, including Hugh Hammer and Ulf White. After Corlys' flagship is ready to sail, Alyn rebuffs his attempts to try and connect with his estranged bastard son. He angrily tells Corlys of the grief and hardship he and Addam suffered growing up poor and without a father figure, and how he grew to hate Corlys' neglect after seeing him care for his legitimate son Ser Leanor Velaryon. Despite this, he still agrees to leave Driftmark with Corlys and join the Velaryon fleet, not wanting to disobey orders.

In season 3, Alyn takes part in the Battle of the Gullet alongside his father. When their ship is rammed by Sharako's Lohar's vessel, and Corlys falls overboard, Alyn manages to fight and kill Lohar. After Corlys is recovered, he promises to make Alyn his heir. After Rhaenyra takes King's Landing, Corlys asks her to legitimize both Alyn and Addam as "Velaryons", but after she refuses to legitimize Addam when he is later knighted, Corlys becomes furious at Rhaenyra's refusal to legitimize his sons when her own children are bastards. After Corlys leaves King's Landing due to his disagreements with Rhaenyra, Alyn sits on Rhaenyra's Small Council in his stead. He later reports to Rhaenyra that despite the heavy losses that the Velaryon Fleet took during the Battle of the Gullet, plans to rebuild the fleet were underway at Driftmark.

=== Cregan Stark ===
Cregan Stark (portrayed by Tom Taylor) is the son of Lord Rickon Stark and succeeds him as Lord of Winterfell, head of House Stark, and Warden of the North. He visits the Wall alongside Prince Jacaerys Velaryon and agrees to uphold his father's oath and support Rhaenyra Targaryen's claim to the Iron Throne. He agrees to send an army of over two thousand men known as the Winter Wolves while he musters the rest of his forces. Consisting of greybeards, aging men who intend to die in combat to preserve supplies for the coming winter, they later march into the Riverlands in support of Rhaenyra by crossing at the Twins.

=== Addam of Hull ===
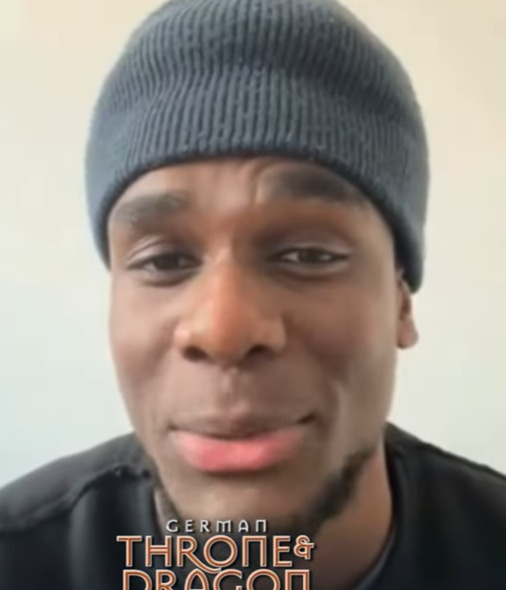
Clinton Liberty

Addam of Hull (portrayed by Clinton Liberty) is a bastard son of Lord Corlys Velaryon, making him a dragonseed, and the younger brother of Alyn of Hull. He becomes a dragonrider after bonding with the dragon Seasmoke. Addam is a shipwright for the Velaryon fleet working out of Driftmark. He reunites with his brother after Alyn spent many months fighting in the Stepstones and later sees the dragon Seasmoke flying overhead. Unlike his brother, Addam is hopeful that Corlys will one day accept them as his sons, although he is disappointed by his own lack of Valyrian features. While preparing to go fishing, he is chased by Seasmoke along a beach on Driftmark. After Seasmoke lands and corners him, he chooses Addam as his dragonrider and allows Addam to bond with and claim him. After flying on Seasmoke for the first time, he is confronted by Rhaenyra Targaryen and pledges himself to her before traveling with her to Dragonstone. Accepted as Rhaenyra's new ally, he is approached by Corlys, who praises his son for the first time and relieves Addam of his position as a shipwright now that he has a new purpose as a dragonrider. Addam attends a feast at Dragonstone with the other dragonriders and acts well-mannered compared to the raconteur Ulf White. Rhaenyra then requests that Addam fly alongside her to Harrenhal, trusting him more than the other new dragonriders, and promises him a knighthood if they win the war.

In season 3, the Dragonseeds are sent to Harrenhal to ambush Aemond Targaryen when he arrives. However, after three days of waiting, they are warned by Alys Rivers of the Battle of the Gullet, and they leave to assist in the battle. After learning that Corlys Velaryon was missing, Addam searches for him on Seasmoke and locates his father. After Rhaenyra takes King's Landing, Corlys asks Rhaenyra to legitimize both Alyn and Addam as "Velaryons". Addam is later knighted by Daemon in the Red Keep, but Rhaenyra styles his name as "Addam of Hull", making Corlys furious at Rhaenyra's refusal to legitimize him when her own children are bastards. Addam then joins Baela to scout the Riverlands and Crownlands to find Vhagar. They manage to uncover evidence of Vhagar in Wendish Town, but discover that she is long gone. Later on, Addam and Baela spot Sheepstealer and tell Rhaenyra that his rider is still alive. He later joins Rhaenyra when she confronts Daemon and stops Rhaena from escaping.

=== Ulf White ===
Ulf White (portrayed by Tom Bennett) is a purported bastard son of Prince Baelon Targaryen, the father of King Viserys I and Prince Daemon, making him a dragonseed. He becomes a dragonrider after bonding with the dragon Silverwing. He is a raconteur and drunkard who is popular among the smallfolk of King's Landing. While drinking in a tavern with his friends Cley and Mujja, the brothel madam Sylvi tells Ulf about the lavish parties and banquets the upper class is having while the smallfolk are starving, and Ulf openly expresses his discontent on the city streets. After learning that Queen Rhaenyra Targaryen is seeking Targaryen bastards in an attempt to find new dragonriders, Ulf is pressured by his friends to go, and he departs for Dragonstone. During the Red Sowing, he witnesses Vermithor massacring dozens of other dragonseeds and is knocked to the ground. He manages to escape the carnage and makes his way deeper into the Dragonmont, where he stumbles upon Silverwing's lair. While initially afraid of the dragon, Silverwing approaches Ulf but remains docile before allowing him to bond with and claim her. He then joyfully flies Silverwing across the skies above King's Landing. Following the Red Sowing, he and Hugh Hammer are brought onto Dragonstone, where Ulf acts rude and jovial despite being in the presence of royalty. Prince Jacaerys Velaryon berates Ulf for the way he acts and forces him to apologize after Ulf insinuates that he and Jacaerys are comparable, as they are both bastards. He later continues to be rude during a feast with Rhaenyra and the other dragonriders, who command that he show respect and promise him a knighthood if they win the war.

In season 3, the Dragonseeds are sent to Harrenhal to ambush Aemond Targaryen when he arrives. Whilst waiting, Ulf talks about how he uncovered his Targaryen blood when a priest from Essos, who paid him to experiment on him, informed him of his "King's Blood". Ulf is disheartened to learn that he would need to become a lord to own a castle rather than a knight. He becomes spooked after they are warned by Alys Rivers of the Battle of the Gullet, and they leave to assist in the battle. Prince Daemon Targaryen scolds them for disobeying orders. Alongside Rhaenyra, Daemon, and Hugh, Ulf helps take King's Landing and is present when Daemon makes Ormund Hightower bend the knee. Ulf is later knighted by Daemon in the Red Keep and asks for his name to be styled "Targaryen"; however, Rhaenyra vehemently refuses, so he asks to be styled as "White" instead, and expresses dissatisfaction with this lack of position. Returning to the tavern he frequents in King's Landing, he reunites with Cley and Mujja. He also witnesses smallfolk protesting Rhaenyra's rule by insulting her children's legitimacy. After he informs Rhaenyra, she forbids him from leaving the Red Keep unless she orders him. During the Battle of Tumbletown, Ulf switches sides after Ormund promises him a lordship. However, he is hungover when the Battle of Tumbleton begins. After being berated and beaten by Ormund, he mounts his dragon and attacks both the Tully army before burning Tumbleton.

=== Kat ===
Kat (portrayed by Ellora Torchia) is the wife of Hugh Hammer, the mother of their sick daughter, and the sister of Leo. With the war escalating and the blockade on King's Landing making life harder for the smallfolk, Kat convinces Hugh that they should relocate to Tumbleton to stay with Leo. However, they are unable to leave the city after the gates are closed on Prince Aemond Targaryen's orders. After their daughter later succumbs to her illness, Kat begs for Hugh to leave the city with her but he refuses after learning that Rhaenyra Targaryen is seeking Targaryen bastards in an attempt to find new dragonriders and reveals to Kat his parentage.

In season 3, Kat witnesses the arrival of Rhaenyra and her dragons when she takes King's Landing and flees the city to live with her brother in Tumbleton. When Ormund Hightower later seizes Tumbleton, his army occupies the town, and soldiers are forced to live with Kat and Leo. Garrick, one of the soldiers, assaults Kat, but Leo defends her. They later petition Ormund to have Garrick punished, which Ormund agrees to, but later has Leo killed by Daeron Targaryen anyway. Hugh sneaks into Tumbleton to try and convince Kat to leave with him, but she refuses, angry that Hugh abandoned her to become a dragonrider. During the Battle of Tumbleton, Kat attempts to protect her brother's family but Hugh later finds her dead in her brother's home.

=== Gwayne Hightower ===
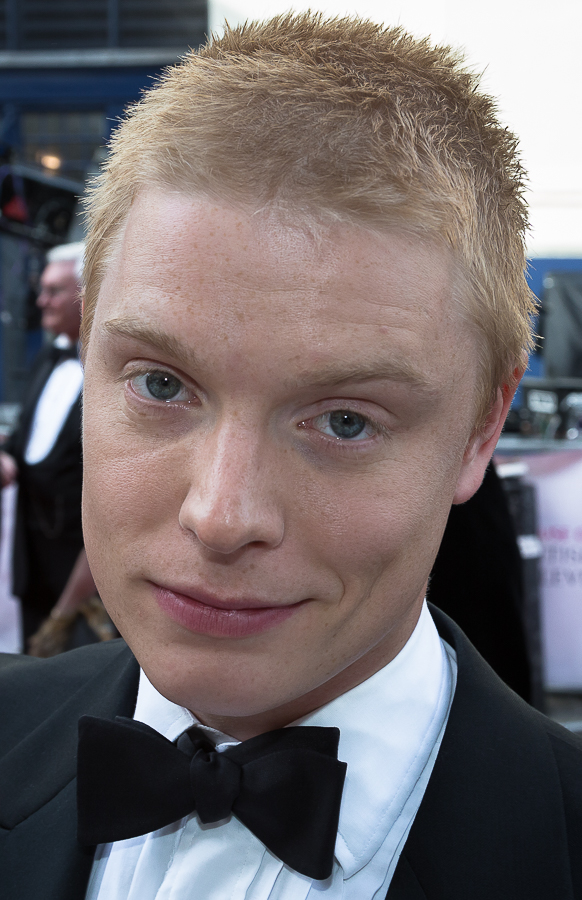
Freddie Fox

Gwayne Hightower (portrayed by Freddie Fox and by Will Willoughby as a younger Gwayne) is the son of Ser Otto Hightower. He participates in the Heir's Tournament, where he is unseated by Prince Daemon Targaryen. In season 2, he journeys with House Hightower forces to King's Landing and accompanies Ser Criston Cole and his army into the Crownlands, and participates in the Battle at Rook's Rest. Following his return to King's Landing, he speaks with his sister, Alicent, about her youngest son, Daeron, whom she hadn't seen for many years since he had become a ward of House Hightower. He then departs King's Landing once again with Criston and their army to march into the Riverlands. While camping in the Riverlands, Gwayne draws his sword on Criston after noticing he has Alicent's favor. Gwayne accuses Criston of sleeping with his sister but backs down after Criston states that he remains loyal to her after she helped prevent him from committing suicide.

In season 3, Criston and Gwayne remain camped in the Riverlands as they plan to march their army to take Harrenhal. After Aemond arrives with Vhagar, they continue their campaign and follow him to Harrenhal. After reaching Harrenhal, they find that Aemond is already gone. Gwayne joins Criston in a guerrilla campaign to slow down Oscar Tully's forces by burning river crossings and attacking their camps during the night. Criston then has his army race to beat the Tully forces to a river crossing at Stoney Sept, but they are too late. Having lost many men to exhaustion or desertion, Gwayne tries to convince Criston to end their campaign now they have no hope of succeeding, but after Criston states he plans to die in combat, Gwayne then abandons Criston and heads to join his cousin Ormund in Tumbleton. He then saves Daeron and Ormund from an assassination attempt when Rhaenyra sends assassins disguised as Baratheon soldiers.

=== Alys Rivers ===
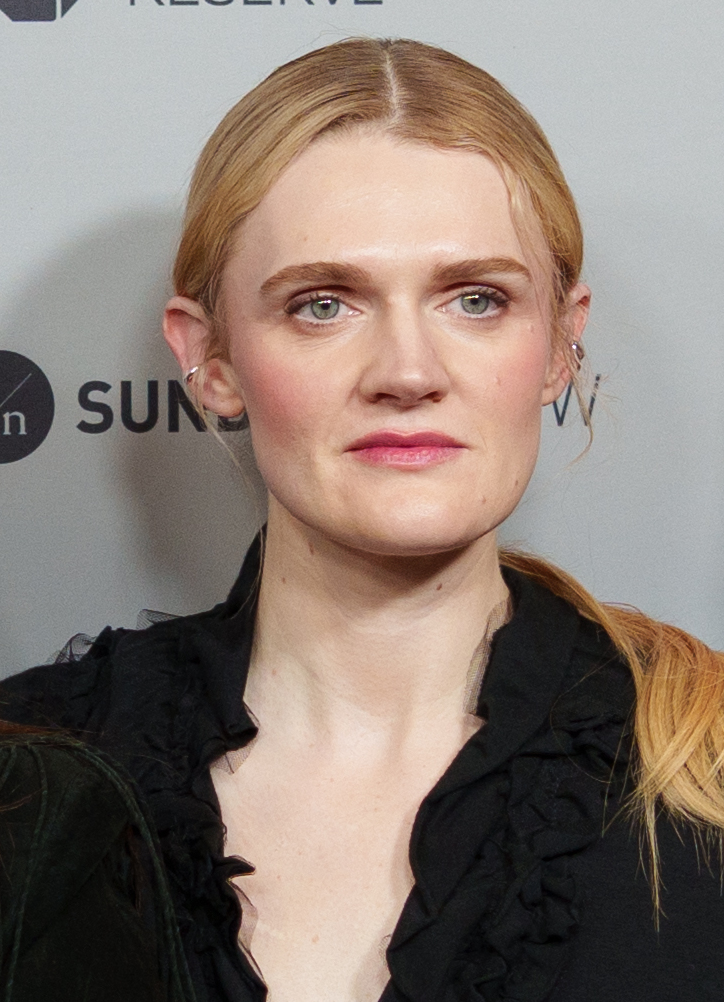
Gayle Rankin

Alys Rivers (portrayed by Gayle Rankin) is a mysterious healer at Harrenhal in service to House Strong. After Prince Daemon claims Harrenhal for Rhaenyra Targaryen, Alys encounters him in Harrenhal's godswood and warns him that he will die there. After Daemon experiences further visions, he confronts Alys in her quarters and discovers that she acts as Harrenhal's maester despite not being one herself, leading him to believe that she is a witch. She questions Daemon's strange visions and seems to induce them herself after brewing him a drink that causes him to lose his sense of time. After Daemon is disturbed by another vision, he plans to confront the Riverlords himself, but Alys stops him from departing. Daemon asks Alys for her counsel; she tells Daemon that he needs House Tully on his side to control the other Riverlords and convinces him that he should wait for three days. Three days later, Ser Simon Strong informs Daemon that Alys had attempted to aid the sick Lord Grover Tully, who died shortly afterward, causing Daemon to cry with joy as he could now better convince Grover's young grandson and successor. Believing that he is now ready, Alys later brings Daemon to the godswood and requests that he place his hand on the weirwood tree, allowing him to peer into the future and experience a multitude of visions.

In season 3, she warns the Dragonseeds of the Battle of the Gullet, convincing them to leave Harrenhal. When Daemon intends to return to King's Landing with Rhaenyra, she asks for Harrenhal in exchange for loyalty, which Daemon refuses but promises to find some other reward. When Aemond takes Harrenhal with Vhagar, he is wounded fighting Simon Strong and his sons, and begs Alys for help. When Ser Criston Cole's army arrives at Harrenhal, she claims that Aemond has fled. Alys helps Aemond recover by tending to his wounds. When bounty hunters arrive to claim Aemond, he defends Alys and kills them all. When Aemond attempts to leave Harrenhal, Alys reveals that she is in possession of five dragon eggs, left behind by Queen Rhaena Targaryen and her dragon Dreamfyre. Alys later saves Aemond's life again when he is poisoned by his mother Alicent. When Aemond reawakens, she reveals that she is the wife of Harren Hoare, the Ironborn king who built Harrenhal, who has been cursed to live forever after trying to use black magic to save her dying son following Aegon the Conqueror's destruction of the castle.

=== Simon Strong ===
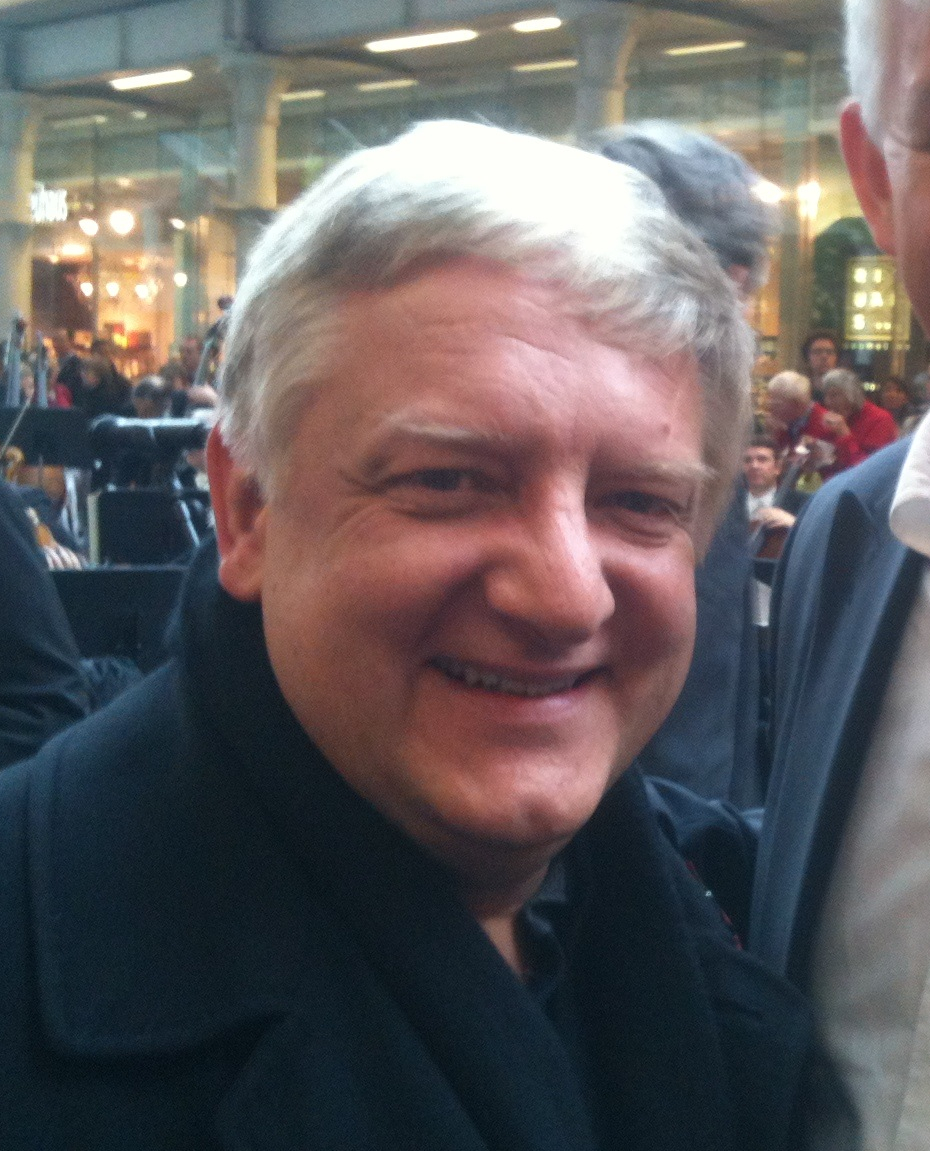
Simon Russell Beale

Simon Strong (portrayed by Simon Russell Beale) is the father of Germund Strong and Paxter Strong, and the uncle of Lord Lyonel Strong. He is the Castellan of Harrenhal but holds no loyalty to his great-nephew Lord Larys Strong for his role in the deaths of Lyonel and Ser Harwin Strong. When Prince Daemon claims Harrenhal for Rhaenyra Targaryen, he willingly yields the castle and pledges his loyalty to Rhaenyra's cause. Daemon orders Simon to summon Lord Grover Tully and the various Riverlords to Harrenhal to pledge themselves to Rhaenyra, but Simon informs Daemon of Grover's fragile state and how the recent Battle of the Burning Mill would complicate things. Simon hosts Ser Oscar Tully and Ser Willem Blackwood when they arrive to meet with Daemon at Harrenhal. Under Daemon's orders, he begins the reconstruction of Harrenhal but requests that Daemon find a way to help fund the work, as Larys had emptied Harrenhal's treasury and moved its contents to King's Landing when he succeeded his father. After Daemon awakens from another vision, he threatens Simon with a knife and questions his loyalty. Simon later informs Daemon of the death of Grover and that his grandson has succeeded him. He soon hosts a gathering of Riverlords at Harrenhal's godswood so that they can pledge themselves to Oscar, the new Lord Paramount of the Riverlands. After Ser Alfred Broome arrives in Harrenhal, Simon overhears him attempt to convince Daemon to claim the throne for himself. Simon sends a message to Rhaenyra, fearful of Daemon's potential betrayal, and greets her when she arrives at Harrenhal.

In season 3, Simon brings wine from Harrenhal to Daemon's forces after his victory against Jason Lannister's army. Aemond later arrives on Vhagar to claim Harrenhal and attempts to force Simon to duel him. Simon refuses, but Aemond stabs him to death anyway and then kills both his sons.

=== Ormund Hightower ===
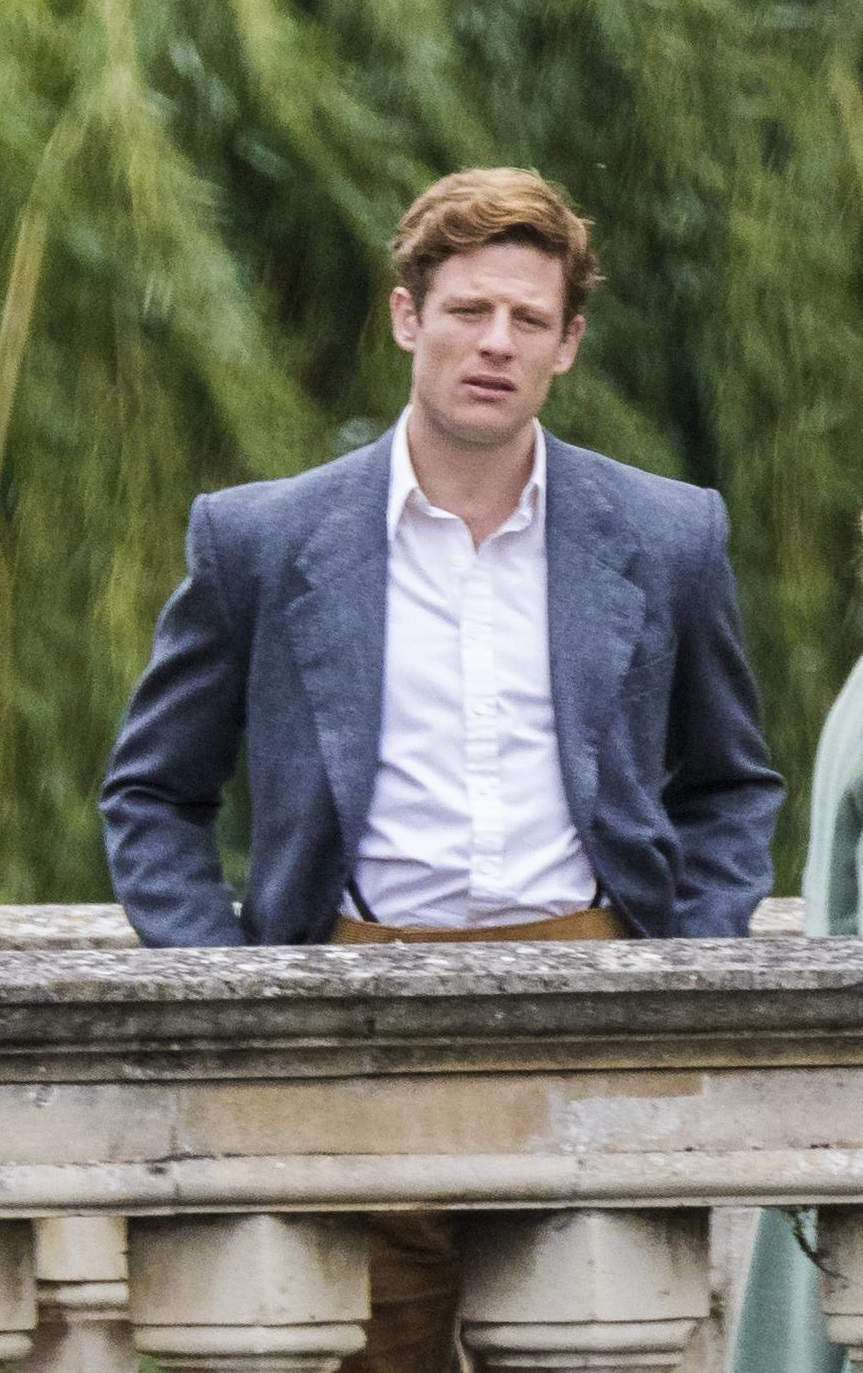
James Norton

Ormund Hightower (portrayed by James Norton) is the son of Lord Hobert Hightower and Lady Lynesse Hightower, who succeeds his father as the Lord of Oldtown and head of House Hightower of the Reach. Ormund submits to Daemon Targaryen after Rhaenyra Targaryen takes King's Landing and gives up "Daeron Targaryen", his ward, when requested. After he is taken hostage to King's Landing, Alicent is brought to see "Daeron", but does not recognise him, as Ormund had forced a merchant boy to pose as her son. Ormund's submission is then revealed to be a ruse, and he seizes the town of Tumbleton. He receives word that Aemond Targaryen and his dragon, and the armies of Criston Cole and Borros Baratheon, will not be coming to his aid, forcing Ormund's forces to hold the town on their own. He also punishes a soldier after he assaults Kat and Leo. Ormund privately tells Daeron that he plans to have Daeron become king, due to him being both devout and visibly more Hightower than Targaryen. He then forces a reluctant Daeron to kill Leo, so he does not show signs of weakness. Ormund later has coins minted with Daeron's likeness and publicly claims Daeron as king. He has spies in King's Landing spread rumours about the illegitimacy of Rhaenyra's children to further push Daeron's claim to the throne, and pays for the deaths of any City Watchmen in King's Landing loyal to Daemon, resulting in several gruesome murders, including the City Watch commander Luthor Largent. During the Battle of Tumbleton, Ormund lines the ramparts with children to prevent dragons from attacking the town. He later fights Roderick Dustin on the battlements and severs his arm before Roderick stabs Ormund in the back. They are then both burned alive when Ulf attacks Tumbleton on Silvering, with Jon Roxton later finding Ormund's burned corpse.

=== Jon Roxton ===
Jon Roxton (portrayed by Joplin Sibtain), also known as "Bold Jon Roxton", is the Head of House Roxton of the Reach. He is part of Lord Ormund Hightower's host and is present when he submits to Daemon Targaryen and when Ormund seizes Tumbleton. Roxton later saves Daeron Targaryen from assassins sent by Rhaenyra, and kidnaps Corlys Velaryon as a hostage. During the Battle of Tumbleton, Roxton battles the Winter Wolves and nearly kills Daemon in a one-on-one duel that is interrupted when Ulf White attacks the town on Silverwing. He later finds Ormund's burned corpse during the aftermath of the battle.

=== Roderick Dustin ===
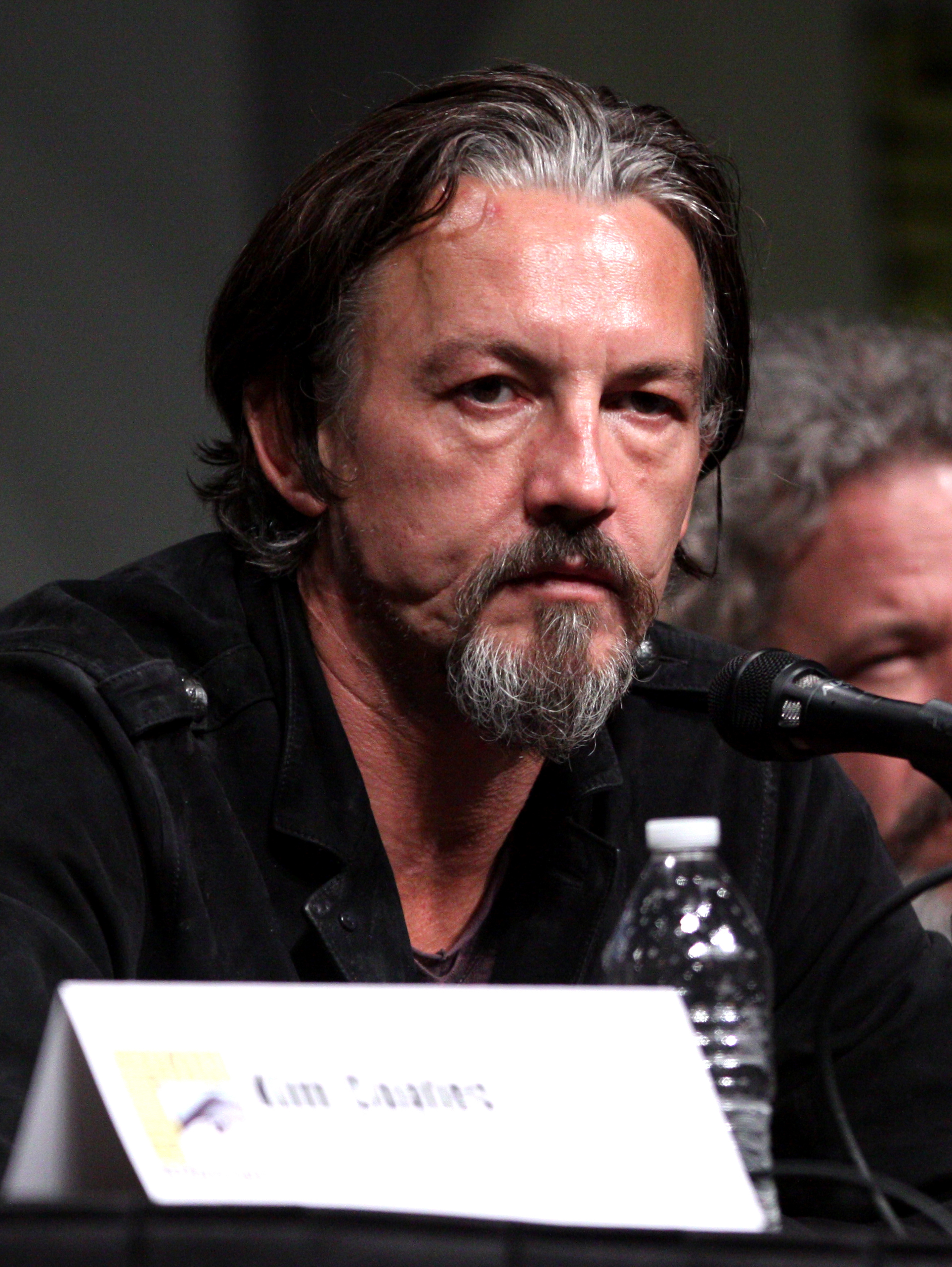
Tommy Flanagan

Roderick Dustin (portrayed by Tommy Flanagan), also known as "Roddy The Ruin", is the Lord of Barrowton and Head of House Dustin of the North. Roderick is the leader of the Winter Wolves, aging men who expect to die in combat, who were sent by Lord Cregan Stark to fight for Queen Rhaenyra Targaryen. In the aftermath of Prince Daemon Targaryen's battle against the Lannister forces, Roderick emerges with Lord Jason Lannister's severed head and declares his loyalty to the queen. He later joins in the celebrations after the battle. After Criston Cole's army delays Oscar Tully's forces' march south by destroying several river crossings, Roderick suggests to Oscar that he send the Winter Wolves to hunt Criston down, but Oscar favours using Criston's guerrilla tactics against him. They later ambush Criston's army, and Roderick is present when Oscar refuses Criston's request to die an honorable death. When Criston warns that many of their own men might die in battle, Roderick laughs it off, telling Criston he and his men want to die in battle. After Criston is killed by Alysanne Blackwood, Roderick orders the Winter Wolves to attack and helps wipe out the remainder of Criston's army. Roderick leads the Winter Wolves during the Battle of Tumbleton and fights Ormund Hightower on the town's battlements. After Ormund severs Roderick's arm, he stabs Ormund in the back and laughs as Ulf attacks Tumbleton on Silverwing and burns them both alive.

=== Torrhen Manderly ===
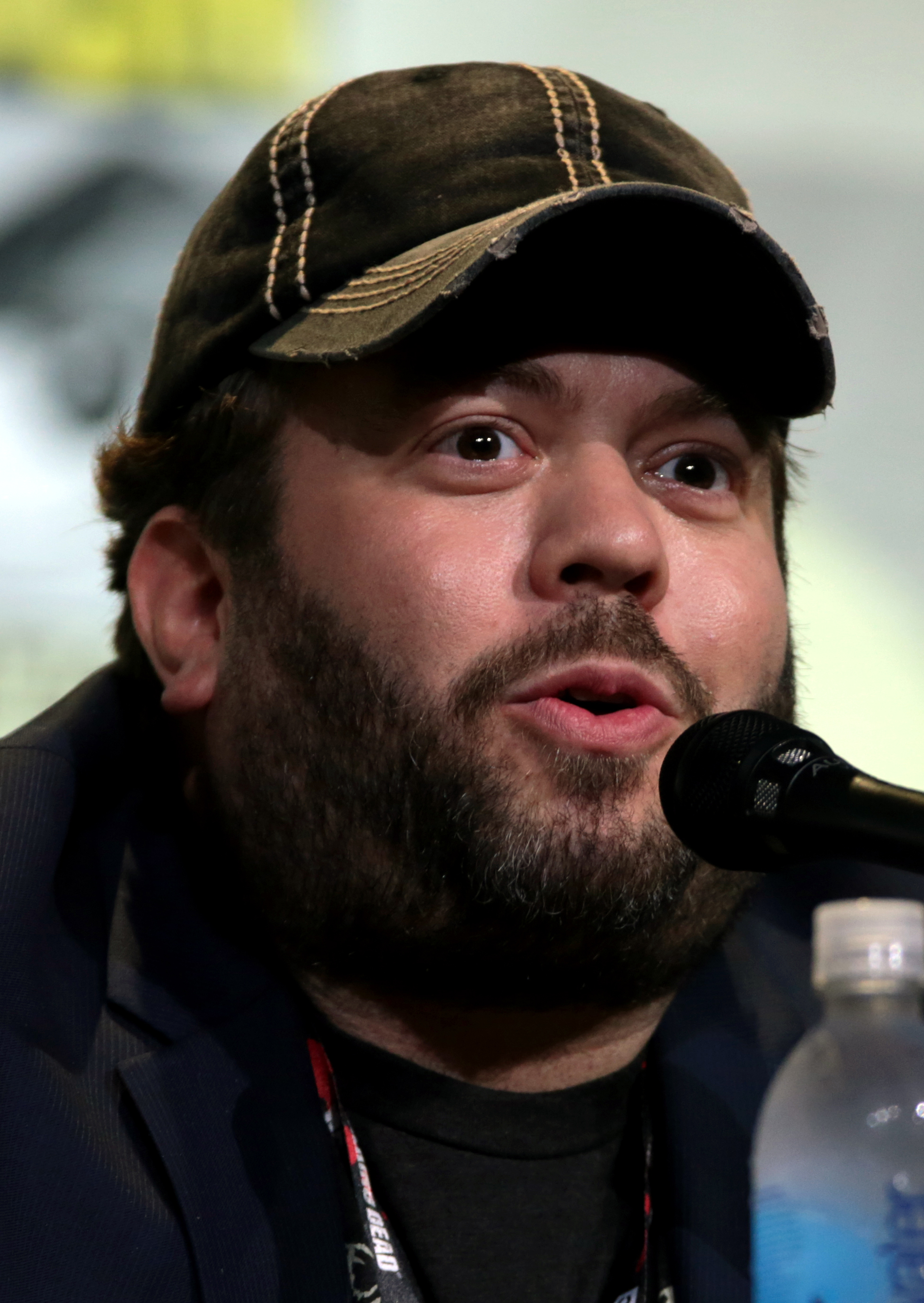
Dan Fogler

Torrhen Manderly (portrayed by Dan Fogler) is a knight of House Manderly of White Harbour in the North who serves as the Master of Coin on Rhaenyra Targaryen's Small Council. After Rhaenyra takes King's Landing, she holds a feast for the nobility of King's Landing, and she punishes them for hoarding food from the smallfolk by serving them rats and having their homes raided by the City Watch. Afterwards, Torrhen compliments her strategy and states that the smallfolk will support her decision and might even make them forget it was her blockade of the Gullet that made food in the city scarce. Rhaenyra later appoints him to the Small Council, and he succeeds Tyland Lannister as the Master of Coin, after Mysaria advised her that Torrhen can take the blame for the city's dire financial situation.

=== Daeron Targaryen ===
Daeron Targaryen (portrayed by Benjamin Evan Ainsworth) is the youngest child of King Viserys I Targaryen and Queen Alicent Hightower. He is a dragonrider who is bonded to the dragon Tessarion. For several years, he remained in Oldtown as the ward of Lord Hobert Hightower and then continued under his son and successor Lord Ormund Hightower. With his young dragon large enough to fight, he flies alongside the Hightower forces as they march to battle. In season 3, Ormund submits to Daemon Targaryen after Rhaenyra Targaryen takes King's Landing and gives up "Daeron" when requested. After he is taken hostage to King's Landing, Alicent is brought to see "Daeron", but does not recognize him, as Ormund had forced a merchant boy to pose as her son. The real Daeron remains with Ormund when he seizes Tumbleton and keeps Tessarion hidden inside the town's keep to protect her. Ormund informs Daeron that he plans to put Daeron on the throne, despite Daeron's reluctance, and forces him to kill Leo so Daeron does not show signs of weakness. Ormund later has coins minted with Daeron's likeness and publicly claims Daeron as king. Upon Gwayne Hightower's arrival at Tumbleton, Daeron argues with his uncle, resenting the fact that he was left alone in Oldtown with Ormund. Rhaenyra later sends some assassins disguised as Baratheon soldiers to kill Daeron, but is saved by Gwayne and Jon Roxton. When Ormund continues to hide his plans from Daeron and Gwayne, Daeron concludes that Ormund is going to get them all killed. Gwayne then suggests that Daeron escape on Tessarion, as Ormund would have no pretence to continue his campaign otherwise, but Daeron refuses to abandon his men and remarks that Rhaenyra may keep her crown for all he cares. As the Tully army organises outside Tumbleton, Daeron and Gwayne free a captive Corlys Velaryon behind Ormund's back in an attempt to sue for peace, but Daemon refuses and takes Corlys prisoner. During the Battle of Tumbleton, Daeron attempts to join the fight on Tessarion, but is talked down by Gwayne, who begs his nephew not to die for Ormund's doomed crusade and urges him to flee. When Ulf White and Silverwing start burning Tumbleton, Daeron and Gwayne are caught in the crossfire; when Gwayne regains consciousness, there is no sign of Daeron.

== Supporting characters ==
=== House Arryn ===
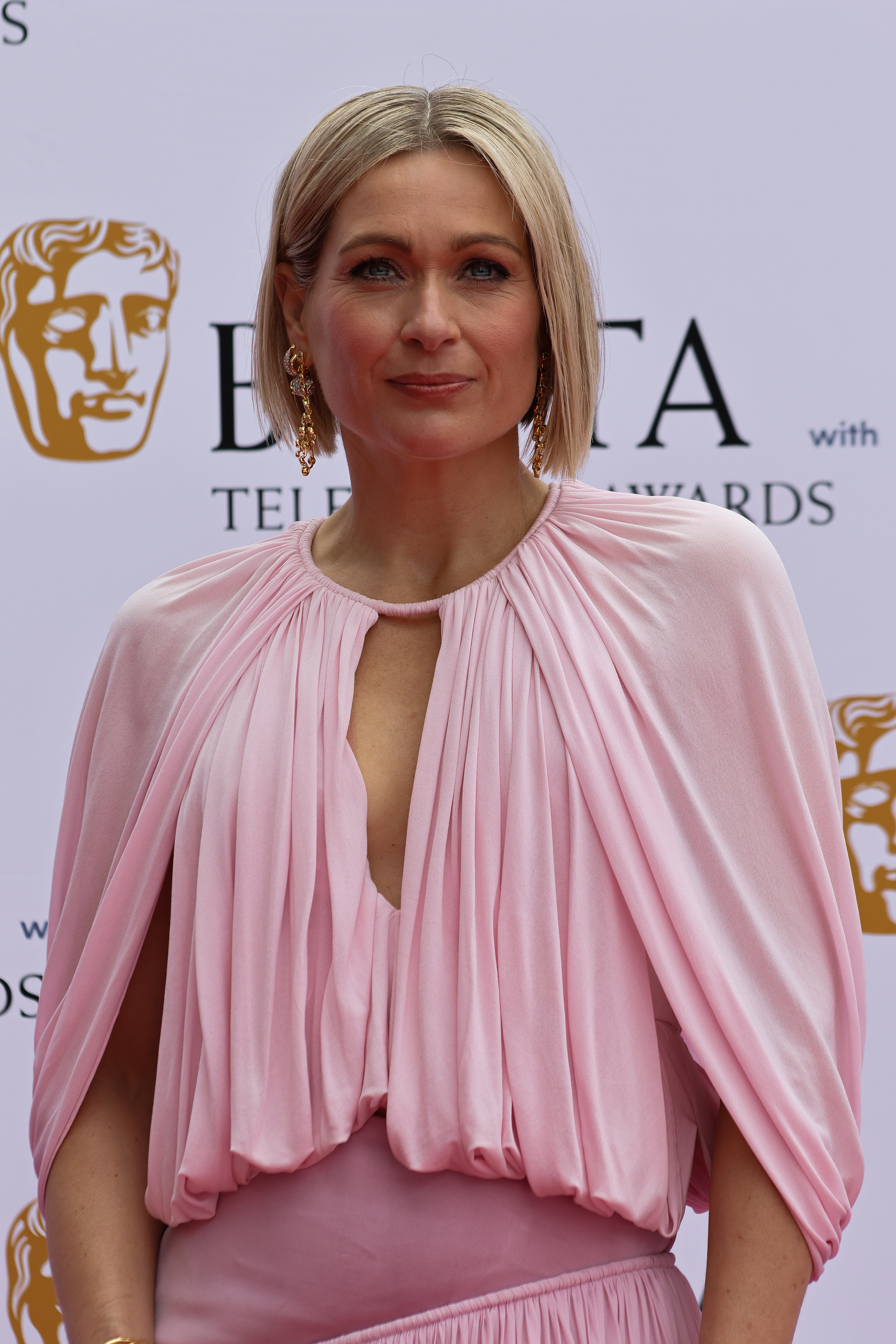
- Siân Brooke
  Aemma Arryn (portrayed by Siân Brooke) is the first wife of Viserys I Targaryen, the mother of Rhaenyra and Baelon Targaryen, and a cousin of Jeyne Arryn. She is also a granddaughter of Jaehaerys I Targaryen through her mother, making Viserys her first cousin. During the Heir's Tournament, Aemma goes into labour and struggles to birth Baelon. Viserys requests that Grand Maester Mellos perform a c-section on her to save the baby. Aemma dies during the operation, and Baelon dies hours later. A funeral is then held, and they are cremated together. In season 2, she appears during Daemon Targaryen's visions at Harrenhal.
- Gerold Royce (portrayed by Owen Oakeshott) is a cousin of Rhea Royce. Following Rhea's death, Gerold attends the royal wedding feast of Laenor Velaryon and Rhaenyra Targaryen in King's Landing, where he confronts Daemon Targaryen with claims that he murdered Rhea, which he denies. Daemon then threatens Gerold that he can request Rhea's inheritance and claim Runestone, the seat of House Royce, should Gerold continue his accusations.
- Rhea Royce (portrayed by Rachel Redford) is the estranged first wife of Daemon Targaryen and a cousin of Gerold Royce. After Daemon secretly confronts Rhea, she falls from her horse and Daemon bludgeons her to death. This allows Daemon to remarry, and Rhea's death is reported as a horse-riding accident.
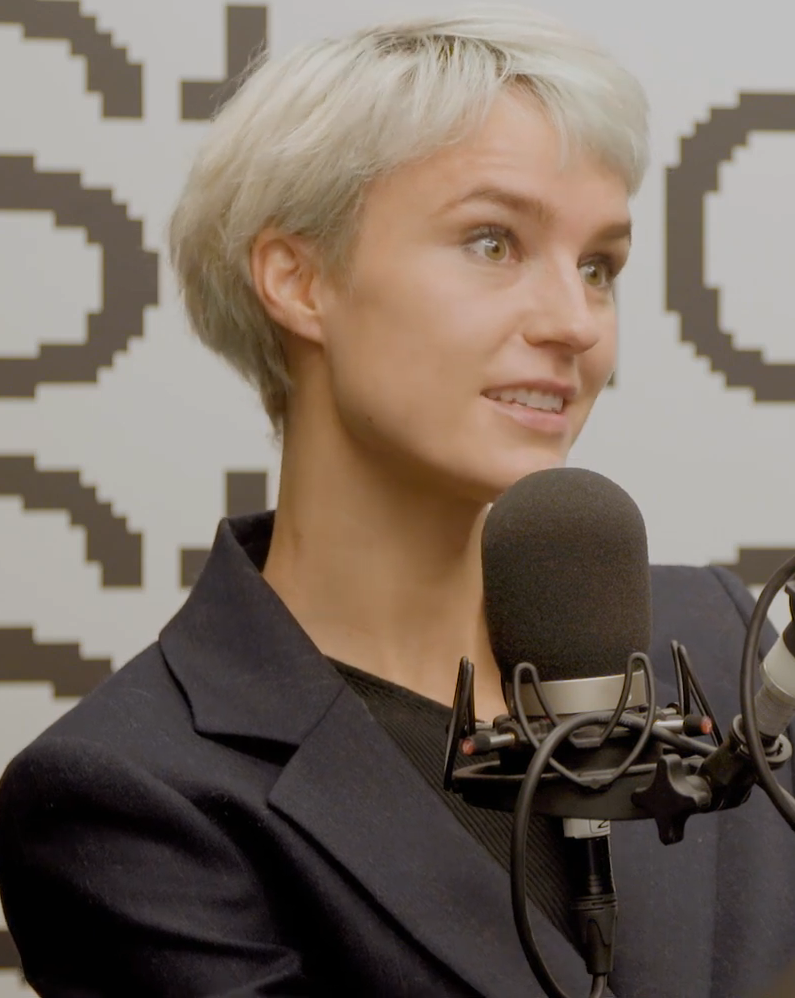
- Amanda Collin
  Jeyne Arryn (portrayed by Amanda Collin), also known as the "Maiden of the Vale", is the Lady of the Eyrie, head of House Arryn, and Warden of the East. She is a cousin of Aemma Arryn. In season 2, Jeyne meets with Jacaerys Velaryon and agrees to uphold her oath to support Rhaenyra Targaryen's claim to the Iron Throne in exchange for a dragon to protect the Vale. She allows Rhaena Targaryen, Joffrey Velaryon, Aegon "the Younger" Targaryen, and Viserys Targaryen to stay in the Eyrie under her protection but is unimpressed that two dragon hatchlings arrived with them instead of a capable adult dragon. Jeyne later has Aegon and Viserys sent to Pentos to be under the protection of Reggio Haratis. She also confirms Rhaena's suspicions that the wild dragon Sheepstealer lived in the Vale. In season 3, after the Battle of the Gullet, Rhaena returns to the Eyrie seeking asylum after unintentionally causing Jace's death. Jeyne agrees to protect Rhaena after she offers to defend the Vale with Sheepstealer, on the condition that Rhaena remain hidden to avoid alerting Rhaenyra to her presence. She also gives Daemon Targaryen 10,000 gold to put towards the financial situation in King's Landing. Jeyne chastises Rhaena for not remaining hidden after the smallfolk report seeing her attempting to see her sister. She later informs Daemon that Rhaena has left the Vale.

=== House Baratheon ===
- Boremund Baratheon (portrayed by Julian Lewis Jones) is the Lord of Storm's End, head of House Baratheon, and Lord Paramount of the Stormlands. He is the father of Borros Baratheon and a cousin of Rhaenys Targaryen. Boremund participates in the Heir's Tournament, where he is unseated by Criston Cole. Alongside many other lords and ladies of Westeros, Boremund swears an oath to support Rhaenyra Targaryen's claim to the Iron Throne. He later hosts Rhaenyra at Storm's End during her tour of Westeros and advises her on various suitors who propose marriage. Boremund dies off-screen of unknown causes, and Borros succeeds him as Lord of Storm's End.
- Beric Dondarrion (portrayed by Paul Leonard) is the Lord of Blackhaven and head of House Dondarrion of the Stormlands. During Rhaenyra Targaryen's tour of Westeros, Beric is one of her many suitors at Storm's End, but is quickly dismissed by Rhaenyra on account of his advanced age.
- Borros Baratheon (portrayed by Roger Evans) is the son of Boremund Baratheon, who succeeds him as the Lord of Storm's End, head of House Baratheon, and Lord Paramount of the Stormlands. He is a cousin of Arrion Baratheon. Following the death of Viserys I Targaryen, Borros arranges a marriage between one of his daughters and Aemond Targaryen. When Lucerys Velaryon arrives in Storm's End as an envoy for Rhaenyra Targaryen, Borros refuses to uphold his father's oath to support her claim to the Iron Throne. In season 3, Ormund Hightower sends ravens to Borros seeking aid, but he refuses. Borros also sends Arrion to King's Landing to act as an envoy, who informs Rhaenyra that Borros is fighting the Vulture King in the Stormlands.
- Arrion Baratheon (portrayed by Daniel Boyd) is a cousin of Borros Baratheon. In season 3, Arrion is sent to King's Landing as an envoy to inform Rhaenyra Targaryen that Borros is busy fighting the Vulture King. Rhaenyra then orders Arrion and his men to remove their armor so she can outfit her own men as part of a ruse to assassinate Ormund Hightower in Tumbleton.

=== House Blackwood ===
- Willem Blackwood (portrayed by Jack Parry-Jones as an adult and by Alfie Todd as a young child) is the brother of Alysanne Blackwood and the regent of Raventree Hall, in the name of his nephew, the child lord of House Blackwood of the Riverlands. During Rhaenyra Targaryen's tour of Westeros, Willem is one of her many suitors at Storm's End. After being mocked by Jerrel Bracken, Willem kills him during a brief duel. In season 2, sixteen years later, Willem agrees to support Daemon Targaryen in exchange for his help to avenge Lord Samwell Blackwood, who was killed during the Battle of the Burning Mill. After Amos Bracken refuses to surrender, Daemon urges Willem to use terror tactics against the Brackens. This proves successful, forcing Amos to pledge his house to Daemon's cause. Willem later pledges House Blackwood to serve both Daemon and Oscar Tully, but Oscar demands that Willem be punished for his transgressions against the Brackens and suggests that Daemon execute Willem to prove himself to the untrusting Riverlords. Daemon obliges and swiftly beheads Willem.
- Davos Blackwood (portrayed by Kieran Burton) is a member of House Blackwood. In season 2, after his family chooses to support Rhaenyra Targaryen, Davos quarrels with Aeron Bracken over a land dispute which eventually escalates into the Battle of the Burning Mill. His fate after the battle is unknown.
- Alysanne Blackwood (portrayed by Annie Shapero), also known as "Black Aly", is the sister of Willem Blackwood. In season 3, Alysanne joins Oscar Tully's forces and helps fight the Lannister army in the Riverlands. After Oscar and Roderick Dustin's forces later surround and defeat Criston Cole's army, Alysanne remains hidden and kills Criston by firing three arrows into him. She also takes part in the Battle of Tumbleton.

=== House Bracken ===
- Humfrey Bracken (portrayed by Chris David Storer) is the Lord of Stone Hedge and head of House Bracken of the Riverlands. He is the father of Jerrel Bracken and Amos Bracken. During Rhaenyra Targaryen's tour of Westeros, Humfrey accompanies Jerrel, who is one of Rhaenyra's many suitors at Storm's End. He later comforts his dying son after Jerrel is killed by Willem Blackwood during a brief duel. Humfrey dies off-screen of unknown causes, and Amos succeeds him as Lord of Stone Hedge.
- Jerrel Bracken (portrayed by Gabriel Scott) is a son of Humfrey Bracken. During Rhaenyra Targaryen's tour of Westeros, Jerrel is one of her many suitors at Storm's End. After insulting the much younger Willem Blackwood, Jerrel is killed by him during a brief duel.
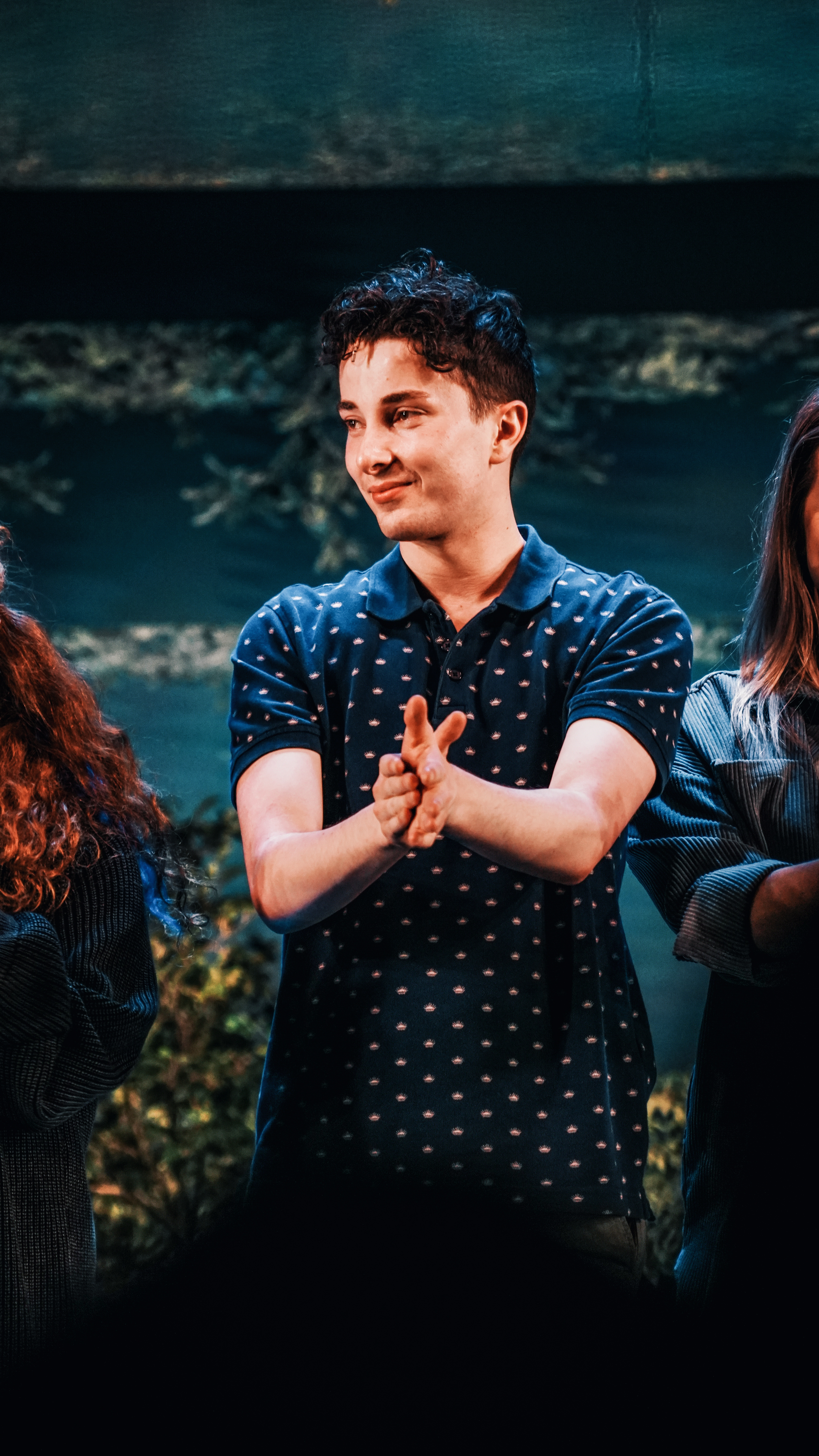
- Ryan Kopel
  Aeron Bracken (portrayed by Ryan Kopel) is a nephew of Amos Bracken. In season 2, after his family chooses to support Aegon II Targaryen, Aeron quarrels with Davos Blackwood over a land dispute which eventually escalates into the Battle of the Burning Mill, where Aeron is killed.
- Amos Bracken (portrayed by Tim Faraday) is a son of Humfrey Bracken, who succeeds him as the Lord of the Stone Hedge and head of House Bracken of the Riverlands. He is the father of Raylon Bracken, brother of Jerrel Bracken, and uncle of Aeron Bracken. In season 2, Amos refuses to surrender to Daemon Targaryen and Willem Blackwood despite their threats to destroy House Bracken. After Willem and the Blackwoods use terror tactics against the Brackens, Amos is forced to pledge his house to Daemon's cause. Willem then takes Amos and Raylon prisoner, and labels them as traitors to the Riverlords gathered at Harrenhal.
- Raylon Bracken (portrayed by Aedan Day) is the son of Amos Bracken. In season 2, after Raylon's father is forced to pledge their house to Daemon's cause, Willem Blackwood takes Raylon prisoner and labels him a traitor to the Riverlords gathered at Harrenhal.

=== House Hightower ===
- Hobert Hightower (portrayed by Steffan Rhodri) is the Lord of Oldtown and head of House Hightower of the Reach. He is the husband of Lynesse Hightower, father of Ormund Hightower, and brother of Otto Hightower. Alongside many other lords and ladies of Westeros, Hobert swears an oath to support Rhaenyra Targaryen's claim to the Iron Throne. During the second nameday celebrations for Aegon Targaryen, Hobert pressures Otto to persuade Viserys I Targaryen to have Aegon named his new heir, as it would strengthen House Hightower's power. Hobert dies off-screen of unknown causes, and Ormund succeeds him as Lord of Oldtown.
- Lynesse Hightower (portrayed by Alana Ramsey) is the wife of Hobert Hightower and mother of Ormund Hightower. During the second nameday celebrations for Aegon Targaryen, Lynesse socializes with Alicent Hightower, Ceira Lannister, and Joselyn Redwyne.
- Soren (portrayed by Ben Dilloway) is a household knight of House Hightower. When Mysaria sends a messenger to the Red Keep with information about Rhaenyra and Daemon Targaryen, Soren informs Otto Hightower. In season 3, Soren has been promoted to captain of the household guard in the Red Keep. Alicent Hightower gives him a forged letter to send to Ormund Hightower. After Rhaenyra takes King's Landing, Soren is arrested by the City Watch along with the rest of the Hightower guard.
- Talya (portrayed by Alexis Raben) is a lady-in-waiting to Alicent Hightower. Talya also acts as a spy for Mysaria and informs her of events occurring in the Red Keep. After the death of Viserys I targaryen, she is among the household staff who are imprisoned. Talya is killed off-screen on the orders of Larys Strong, who tortures and executes all of the Red Keep's servants to remove suspected spies.
- False Daeron Targaryen (portrayed by Charlie Gordon) is a merchant boy whose family serves House Hightower. In season 3, Ormund Hightower has the boy's hair bleached silver so he can pose as Daeron Targaryen. When Ormund submits to Daemon Targaryen after Rhaenyra Targaryen takes King's Landing, he gives up the false Daeron when requested. After the boy is taken to King's Landing as a hostage, Alicent Hightower is allowed to visit "Daeron", but does not recognize him. The boy reveals to Rhaenyra that Ormund had forced him to pose as Daeron after threatening his mother's life.
- Garrick of Whitegrove (portrayed by Douglas Russell) is a household knight of House Hightower. In season 3, Garrick is part of Ormund Hightower's forces that occupy Tumbleton. He is forced to live with Kat and Leo, and later assaults Kat, causing Leo to defend her. Kat and Leo later petition Ormund to have Garrick punished. Ormund agrees and has Garrick gelded and one arm broken.

=== House Strong ===
- Lyonel Strong (portrayed by Gavin Spokes) is the Lord of Harrenhal and head of House Strong of the Riverlands who serves as the Master of Laws on the Small Council of Viserys I Targaryen and later switches positions when he succeeds Otto Hightower as the Hand of the King. He is the father of Harwin Strong and Larys Strong. Following the death of Aemma Arryn, Lyonel objects to Rhaenyra Targaryen becoming Viserys' chosen heir due to her gender. He supports Corlys Velaryon's proposal for Viserys to marry Laena Velaryon and later suggests that Rhaenyra marry Laenor Velaryon to mend the rift between House Targaryen and House Velaryon. Ten years later, Lyonel attempts to resign his position following rumors that Harwin and Rhaenyra have had three bastard children together, but Viserys refuses. Lyonel then escorts Harwin to Harrenhal after he is dismissed from the City Watch for fighting Criston Cole. Both Lyonel and Harwin later burn to death when their chambers are set on fire, orchestrated by Larys, who succeeds his father as Lord of Harrenhal.
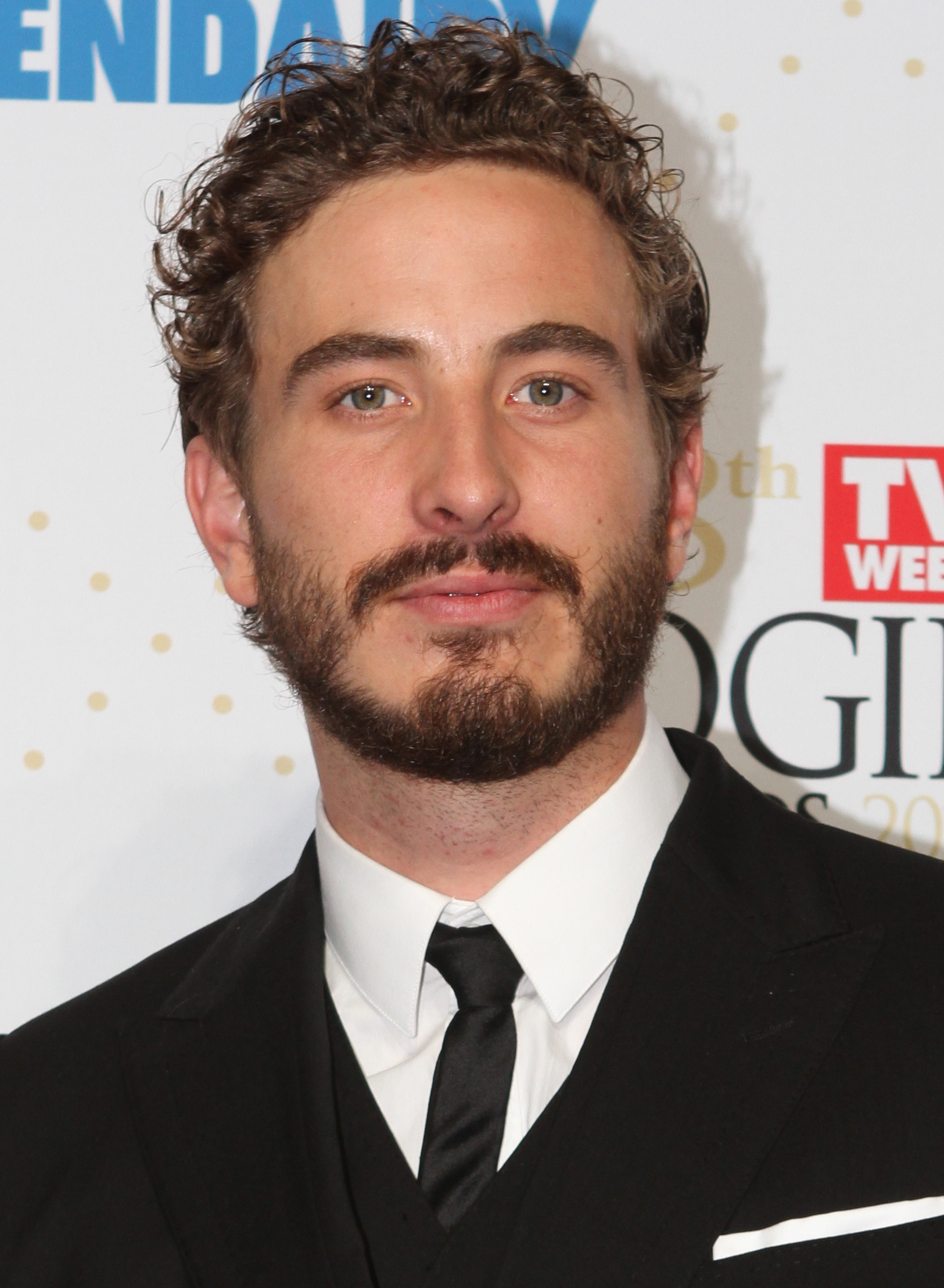
- Ryan Corr
  Harwin Strong (portrayed by Ryan Corr), also known as "Breakbones", is the elder son of Lyonel Strong and brother of Larys Strong. He is a secret lover of Rhaenyra Targaryen and the biological father of her children, Jacaerys Velaryon, Lucerys Velaryon, and Joffrey Velaryon. He also serves as the Lord Commander of the City Watch and is said to be the strongest man in the Seven Kingdoms. When Harwin's father becomes Hand of the King, he moves to King's Landing and joins the City Watch. At the royal wedding feast of Laenor Velaryon and Rhaenyra, Lyonel orders Harwin to rescue Rhaenyra after the crowd begins to panic when Criston Cole attacks Joffrey Lonmouth. Ten years later, Harwin has become Lord Commander of the City Watch and secretly fathered three children with Rhaenyra. He is provoked into fighting Criston when he insinuates that Rhaenyra's children are illegitimate. Lyonel then escorts Harwin to Harrenhal after he is dismissed from the City Watch. Both Lyonel and Harwin later burn to death when their chambers are set on fire, orchestrated by Larys.
- Paxter Strong (portrayed by Graeme McKnight) is a son of Simon Strong and brother of Germund Strong. In season 2, when Daemon Targaryen claims Harrenhal for Rhaenyra Targaryen, Paxter is residing in Harrenhal with his father. In season 3, when Aemond Targaryen arrives to claim Harrenhal, he kills both Simon and Germund, but Paxter stabs Aemond in the back before he too is killed.
- Germund Strong (portrayed by Paul Valentine) is a son of Simon Strong and brother of Paxter Strong. In season 2, when Daemon Targaryen claims Harrenhal for Rhaenyra Targaryen, Germund is residing in Harrenhal with his father. In season 3, when Aemond Targaryen arrives to claim Harrenhal, he stabs Simon with a dagger, then kills both Germund and Paxter with his sword.

=== House Targaryen ===
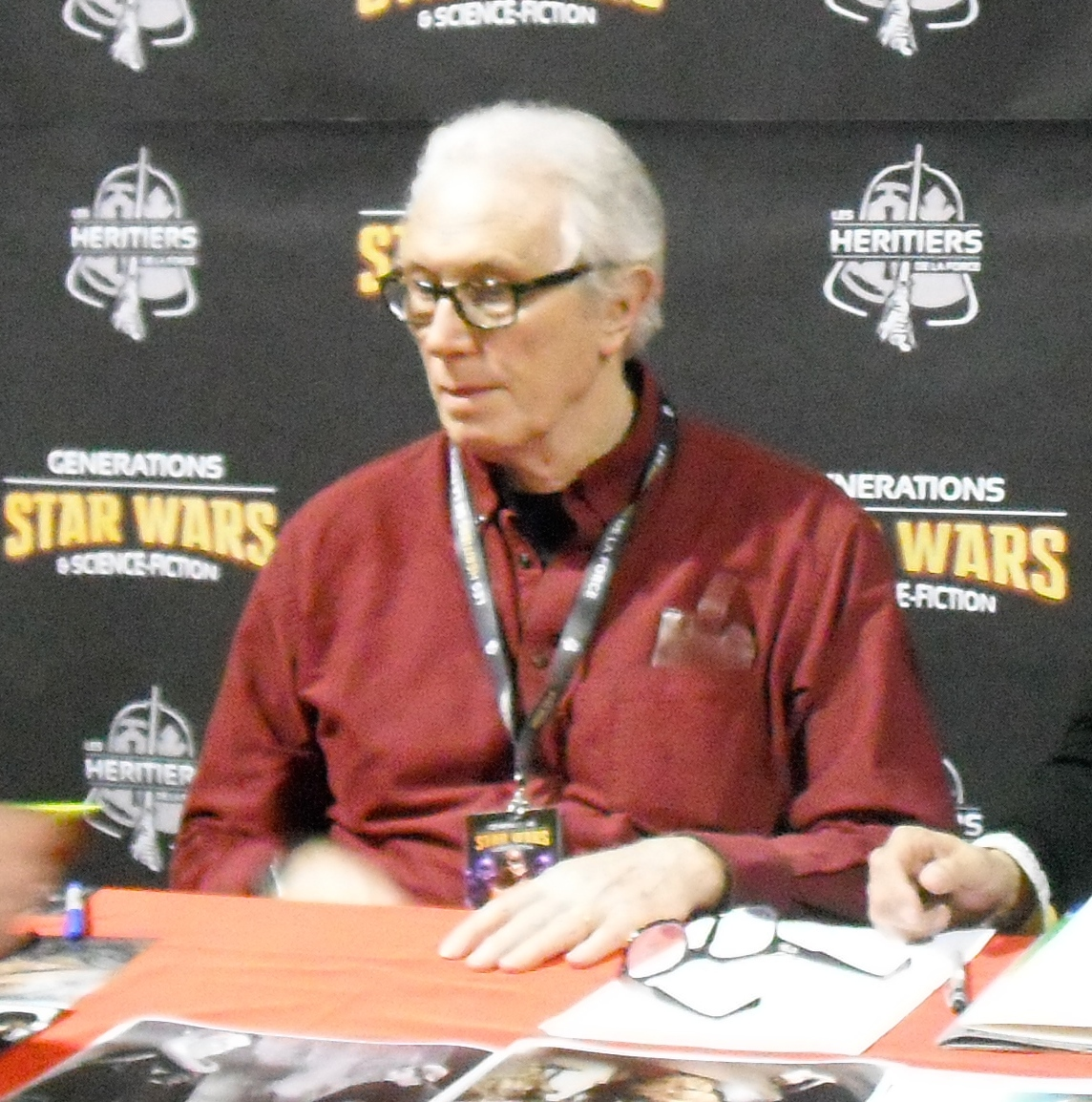
- Michael Carter
  Jaehaerys I Targaryen (portrayed by Michael Carter), also known as the "Jaehaerys the Conciliator" or the "Old King", was the fourth king of the Seven Kingdoms. He is the grandfather of Rhaenys Targaryen, Viserys I Targaryen, Daemon Targaryen, Aemma Arryn, and Hugh Hammer. He was a dragonrider who was bonded to the dragon Vermithor. Jaehaerys ruled for over half a century and outlived all his children. He eventually had to organize the Great Council at Harrenhal to choose an heir from his grandchildren, ultimately deciding on Viserys, who later succeeded Jaehaerys following his death from illness.
- Alyssa Targaryen (portrayed by Emeline Lambert) was a daughter of Jaehaerys I Targaryen, sister/wife of Baelon Targaryen, and the mother of Viserys I Targaryen and Daemon Targaryen. She was a dragonrider who was bonded to the dragon Meleys. Alyssa died following complications during her third childbirth. In season 2, she appears during Daemon Targaryen's visions at Harrenhal.
- Brynden Rivers (portrayed by Joshua Ben-Tovim and previously portrayed by Struan Rodger and Max von Sydow in Game of Thrones), also known as "Bloodraven" and the "Three-Eyed Raven", is a future Targaryen bastard and descendant of Rhaenyra Targaryen and Daemon Targaryen. In season 2, when Daemon meets with Alfred Broome in Harrenhal's godswood, Alfred hears Brynden's voice call him a traitor. Daemon later sees Brynden in a vision set roughly a century after the Dance of the Dragons, of him becoming the Three-Eyed Raven when his body is fused with a weirwood tree beyond the Wall.
- Jaehaerys Targaryen is the son of Aegon II Targaryen and Helaena Targaryen, and the twin brother of Jaehaera Targaryen. After his father becomes king, Jaehaerys becomes the heir to the Iron Throne. In season 2, Aegon brings Jaehaerys to a Small Council meeting where he humiliates Tyland Lannister by stealing his marble of office. Jaehaerys is later decapitated in his bed by Blood and Cheese, who were sent by Daemon Targaryen to assassinate Aemond Targaryen but killed Jaehaerys instead in retaliation for Lucerys Velaryon's death. Jaehaerys' severed head is later recovered when Blood is captured, and is sewn back onto his body for a funeral procession.
- Jaehaera Targaryen is the daughter of Aegon II Targaryen and Helaena Targaryen, and the twin sister of Jaehaerys Targaryen. In season 2, when her brother is killed by Blood and Cheese, Helaena brings Jaehaera to safety. In season 3, Alicent Hightower attempts to flee the city with Helaena and Jaehaera when Rhaenyra Targaryen takes King's Landing. However, they are captured and returned to the Red Keep. Alicent and Helaena are subsequently locked in their chambers and are only allowed to spend limited time with Jaehaera.
- Aegon "the Younger" Targaryen is the elder son of Rhaenyra Targaryen and Daemon Targaryen and Rhaenyra's fourth son overall. He is the brother of Jacaerys Velaryon, Lucerys Velaryon, Joffrey Velaryon, and Viserys Targaryen. He is bonded to the dragon hatchling Stormcloud. In season 2, after Rhaenyra survives an assassination attempt, she sends Aegon with Rhaena Targaryen, Joffrey, and Viserys to the Eyrie to be under Jeyne Arryn's protection. He later leaves the Eyrie with Viserys and Stormcloud when they are sent to Pentos to be under the protection of Reggio Haratis.
- Viserys Targaryen is the younger son of Rhaenyra Targaryen and Daemon Targaryen and Rhaenyra's fifth son overall. He is the brother of Jacaerys Velaryon, Lucerys Velaryon, Joffrey Velaryon, and Aegon "the Younger" Targaryen. He is in possession of an unhatched dragon egg. In season 2, after Rhaenyra survives an assassination attempt, she sends Viserys with Rhaena Targaryen, Joffrey, and Aegon to the Eyrie to be under Jeyne Arryn's protection. He later leaves the Eyrie with Aegon and Stormcloud when they are sent to Pentos to be under the protection of Reggio Haratis.
- Axell Bulwer (portrayed by Eddie Eyre) is a household knight of House Targaryen. In season 2, Axell acts as an officer in Criston Cole's army and participates in the Battle at Rook's Rest. He later heralds their victory when they return to King's Landing. In season 3, following the defeat of Criston's army during the Butcher's Ball, Axell's fate is unknown.
- Edgar (portrayed by Richard Flood) is a household knight of House Targaryen. In season 3, Edgar acts as an officer in Criston Cole's army and takes part in a guerrilla campaign against Oscar Tully's forces. Despite many soldiers deserting the army, Edgar remains with Criston until they are ambushed during the Butcher's Ball, where Criston is killed. Edgar and the rest of the army are then killed by Tully soldiers.

=== House Tully ===
- Oscar Tully (portrayed by Archie Barnes) is the grandson of Lord Grover Tully and succeeds him as the Lord of Riverrun, head of House Tully, and Lord Paramount of the Riverlands. He travels to Harrenhal in place of his frail grandfather to meet with Prince Daemon Targaryen but refuses to speak for his grandfather while he is still alive and is dismissed. Following his grandfather's death from illness, he succeeds him as Lord of Riverrun and travels to Harrenhal to conduct a gathering with several Riverlords so they can swear their allegiance to him. While he agrees to uphold his grandfather's oath and support Queen Rhaenyra Targaryen's claim to the Iron Throne, he insults Daemon over his methods of trying to raise an army and commands that he execute Ser Willem Blackwood for his razing and pillaging of House Bracken lands to help gain the trust of the other Riverlords, which Daemon obliges. In season 3, Oscar participates in a battle against the Lannister armies in the Riverlands, in which he disagrees with Daemon's choice to burn the bodies of the fallen rather than bury them. He later joins in the celebrations after the battle. Oscar and Roderick Dustin's forces are later delayed during their march south after Criston Cole's army burns several river crossings. Oscar continues his journey and manages to beat Criston to the river crossing at Stoney Sept, and has the bridge burned behind them. Oscar's forces later ambush Criston's men and surround them. Oscar refuses Criston's request for an honorable death, and commands his forces to wipe out the remainder of Criston's men.
- Forrest Frey (portrayed as Kenneth Collard) is the husband of Sabitha Frey. He is the Lord of the Crossing and head of House Frey of the Riverlands. He and his wife meet with Jacaerys Velaryon at the Twins to discuss allowing the armies of the North pledged to Rhaenyra Targaryen to pass through the Twins on their way south.
- Sabitha Frey (portrayed by Sarah Woodward) is wife of Lord Forrest Frey. She also serves as an advisor on Rhaenyra Targaryen's Small Council. She and her husband meet with Jacaerys Velaryon at the Twins and request that Rhaenyra give House Frey the recently captured castle of Harrenhal in exchange for their support. In season 3, she is granted a seat on Rhaenyra's Small Council, however, she voices her grivences after learning that Rhaenyra has promised Harrenhal to Aemond Targaryen's killer, instead of gifting the castle to House Frey as previously agreed. After serving on the council for several meetings, Rhaenyra reluctantly tells Sabitha to return to the Twins to gather the Frey army and march on Harrenhal.
- Petyr Piper (portrayed by Antonio Magro) is the Lord of Pinkmaiden and head of House Piper of the Riverlands. Alongside other Riverlords, Petyr travels to Harrenhal to berate Prince Daemon Targaryen for House Blackwood's pillaging and raiding of House Bracken's lands and refuses to pledge his house to Daemon's cause, stating that the Blackwoods have no honor. Following the death of Lord Grover Tully, he is summoned to Harrenhal alongside several other Riverlords to pledge himself to Lord Oscar Tully but is skeptical of his young age and inexperience. In season 3, after delivering news to Oscar and Roderick Dustin that Criston Cole's army has burned a river crossing, Petyr is ordered to take some men and ride to the Stoney Sept to secure another river crossing. Petyr then returns to his tent, but his throat is slit by Criston during a raid on his camp.
- Lord Darry (portrayed by John-Paul Hurley) is the Lord of Castle Darry and head of House Darry of the Riverlands. Alongside other Riverlords, he travels to Harrenhal to berate Prince Daemon Targaryen for House Blackwood's pillaging and raiding of House Bracken's lands and refuses to pledge his house to Daemon's cause, stating his belief that Daemon ordered the murder of Prince Jaehaerys Targaryen. Following the death of Lord Grover Tully, he is summoned to Harrenhal alongside several other Riverlords to pledge himself to Lord Oscar Tully and denounces the Blackwoods using Daemon's authority to exact revenge on their ancient rivals the Brackens. In season 3, Addam of Hull reports to Rhaenyra Targaryen that several farms near Wendish Town, which is ruled by House Darry, have been burned by Vhagar. Rhaenyra replies that Lord Darry is her ally, and questions whether she is being provoked.
- Lady Mallister (portrayed by Anna Francolini) is the Lady of Seaguard and the head of House Mallister of the Riverlands. Alongside other Riverlords, she travels to Harrenhal to berate Prince Daemon Targaryen for House Blackwood's pillaging and raiding of House Bracken's lands and refuses to pledge her house to Daemon's cause, calling him a tyrant. Following the death of Lord Grover Tully, she is summoned to Harrenhal alongside several other Riverlords to pledge herself to Lord Oscar Tully and demands justice for the crimes committed by the Blackwoods.
- Lord Mooton (portrayed by Turlough Convery) is the Lord of Maidenpool and head of House Mooton of the Riverlands. Alongside other Riverlords, he travels to Harrenhal to berate Prince Daemon Targaryen for House Blackwood's pillaging and raiding of House Bracken's lands and refuses to pledge his house to Daemon's cause, stating how the Blackwoods' atrocities were carried out under the banners of House Targaryen. Queen Rhaenyra Targaryen later sends word to Lord Mooton to request his help in reclaiming Rook's Rest in her name. Following the death of Lord Grover Tully, he is summoned to Harrenhal alongside several other Riverlords to pledge himself to Lord Oscar Tully.
- Walys Mooton (portrayed by Richard Riddell) is a knight of House Mooton. He leads an army through the Crownlands searching for Tyland Lannister and discovers both Aegon II Targaryen and Tyland on his way to Rook's Rest. After the pair refuse to surrender, Aegon's dragon Sunfyre approaches and burns all the Mooton soldiers alive, including Walys.

=== House Velaryon ===
- Laenor Velaryon (portrayed by John Macmillan as an adult, by Theo Nate as a teenager, and by Matthew Carver as a young child) is the son of Lord Corlys Velaryon and Princess Rhaenys Targaryen, first husband of Princess Rhaenyra Targaryen and legal father to her children Prince Jacaerys, Prince Lucerys and Prince Joffrey Velaryon. He is a dragonrider who is bonded to the dragon Seasmoke. He participates in the War for the Stepstones with Seasmoke alongside his father. After he is arranged to marry Rhaenyra, they come to an understanding that they will perform their royal duties together but that Laenor can continue his relationship with his male lover, Ser Joffrey Lonmouth. However, at their royal wedding feast, Joffrey is beaten to death by Ser Criston Cole after Joffrey discovers that Criston is Rhaenyra's secret lover. Ten years later, Rhaenyra's first three sons had all been fathered by her lover Ser Harwin Strong, with Laenor being their father legally, so they remain legitimate. He had since taken a new lover, Ser Qarl Correy, and attends his sister's funeral at Driftmark. To strengthen Rhaenyra's claim to the Iron Throne by having her marry Prince Daemon Targaryen, Daemon helps fake Laenor's death, which allows him to flee with Qarl on a boat to go into exile in Essos.
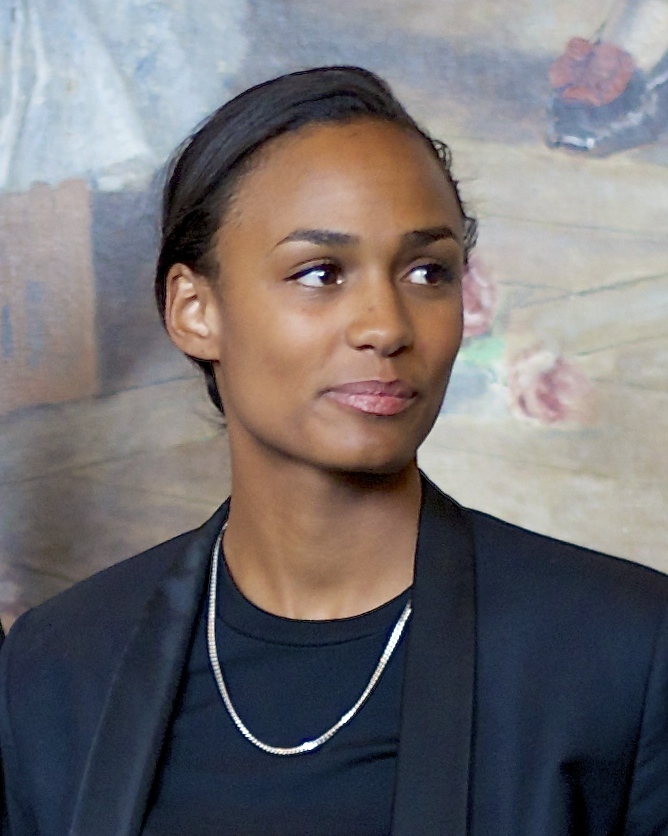
- Nanna Blondell
  Laena Velaryon (portrayed by Nanna Blondell as an adult, by Savannah Steyn as a teenager, and by Nova Foueillis-Mosé as a young child) is the daughter of Lord Corlys Velaryon and Princess Rhaenys Targaryen, the second wife of Prince Daemon Targaryen and mother of Lady Baela Targaryen and Lady Rhaena Targaryen. She is a dragonrider who is bonded to the dragon Vhagar. After the death of Queen Aemma Arryn, Corlys proposes marrying Laena to King Viserys I Targaryen, who refuses due to her young age. She attends the royal wedding feast of her older brother Ser Laenor Velaryon and Princess Rhaenyra Targaryen and gets the attention of Daemon, later leading to them getting married before they move to Pentos together. Ten years later, during her third pregnancy, she suffers prolonged labor, and after she is unable to deliver, she commits suicide by having Vhagar incinerate her. Her funeral is later held at Driftmark, and Vhagar is claimed by Prince Aemond Targaryen. In season 2, she appears during Daemon's mysterious visions while staying in Harrenhal.
- Vaemond Velaryon (portrayed by Wil Johnson) is the younger brother of Lord Corlys Velaryon and a commander of the Velaryon fleet. He participates in the War for the Stepstones alongside his brother. Ten years later, he delivers a eulogy at the funeral of his niece, Lady Laena Velaryon. Six years later, Vaemond petitions Ser Otto Hightower to name him the heir to Driftmark in the event of his brother's death, who had fallen gravely ill. Both King Viserys I Targaryen and Princess Rhaenys Targaryen dispute this, causing Vaemond to insult Rhaenyra and publicly declare that her children are illegitimate, resulting in Prince Daemon Targaryen decapitating him.
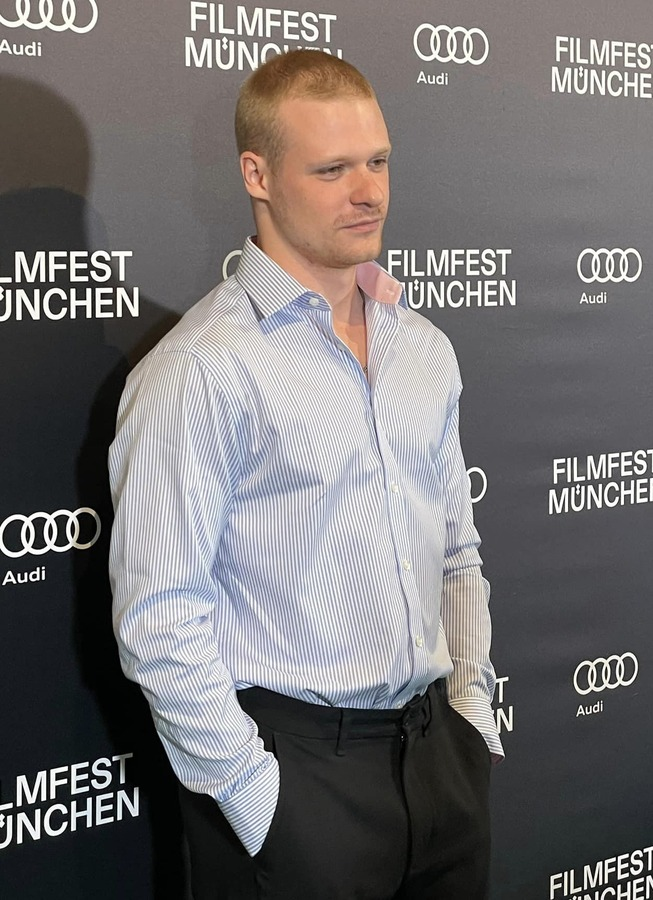
- Solly McLeod
  Joffrey Lonmouth (portrayed by Solly McLeod), also known as the "Knight of Kisses", is a household knight of House Velaryon who is the battle companion and lover to Ser Laenor Velaryon. He participates in the War for the Stepstones alongside Laenor. At the royal wedding feast of Laenor and Princess Rhaenyra Targaryen, he reveals to Ser Criston Cole that he is aware of Criston's secret affair with Rhaenyra and is subsequently beaten to death by him. Laenor would eventually name his third son in honor of Joffrey.
- Qarl Correy (portrayed by Arty Froushan) is a household knight of House Velaryon and lover of Ser Laenor Velaryon. Prince Daemon Targaryen secretly conspires with Qarl and provides him with enough gold to allow him and Laenor to run away together. They then fake Laenor's death and flee on a boat to go into exile in Essos.
- Lucerys "Luke" Velaryon (portrayed by Elliot Grihault as a teenager and by Harvey Sadler as a young child) is the second son of Queen Rhaenyra Targaryen, his legal father Ser Laenor Velaryon and his biological father Ser Harwin Strong. He is a dragonrider who is bonded to the dragon Arrax. Following the funeral of Lady Laena Velaryon, after discovering that Prince Aemond Targaryen had claimed Laena's dragon Vhagar, Lucerys slashes Aemond's eye with a knife, partially blinding him. Six years later, Luke is betrothed to his cousin Lady Rhaena Targaryen, who together would act as the joint heirs to Driftmark once married. Following the death of King Viserys I Targaryen, Luke is sent as an envoy to House Baratheon and meets with Lord Borros Baratheon at Storm's End to ensure that he keeps his father's oath to support Rhaenyra's claim to the Iron Throne. He is refused, however, as Aemond had arrived first and arranged a political alliance with Borros through marriage with one of his daughters. After Luke leaves on Arrax, he is pursued by Aemond on Vhagar, but Vhagar disobeys Aemond's commands and attacks Luke and Arrax, devouring them both. In season 2, Arrax's partial remains are found by Rhaenyra but nothing remained of Luke as he was devoured whole. His funeral is later held at Dragonstone.
- Joffrey Velaryon (portrayed by Oscar Eskinazi) is the third son of Queen Rhaenyra Targaryen, his legal father Ser Laenor Velaryon, and his biological father Ser Harwin Strong. He is bonded to the dragon hatchling Tyraxes. In season 2, he attends his older brother Prince Lucerys Velaryon's funeral at Dragonstone and places one of his toys onto the funeral pyre. After the assassination attempt on his mother, Joffrey and his younger half-brothers Prince Aegon "the Younger" and Prince Viserys Targaryen are sent away from Dragonstone with Lady Rhaena Targaryen to the Eyrie to be under Lady Jeyne Arryn's protection. In season 3, Rhaenyra requests that Joffrey be brought to King's Landing after she takes the city, as following the death of his brother Jacaerys during the Battle of the Gullet, Joffrey is now Rhaenyra's heir. Joffrey later arrives in the city and lives in the Red Keep, though Rhaenyra is too busy with her duties to see her son.
- Kelvyn (portrayed by Haqi Ali) is the Maester of Driftmark serving House Velaryon. After Prince Lucerys Velaryon partially blinds Prince Aemond Targaryen, Kelvyn tends to his eye, and later Princess Rhaenyra Targaryen's arm when Queen Alicent Hightower wounds her. Six years later, he had been tending to Lord Corlys Velaryon's injuries received during fighting in the Stepstones and reports his condition to Princess Rhaenys Targaryen.

=== Royal court and officials ===
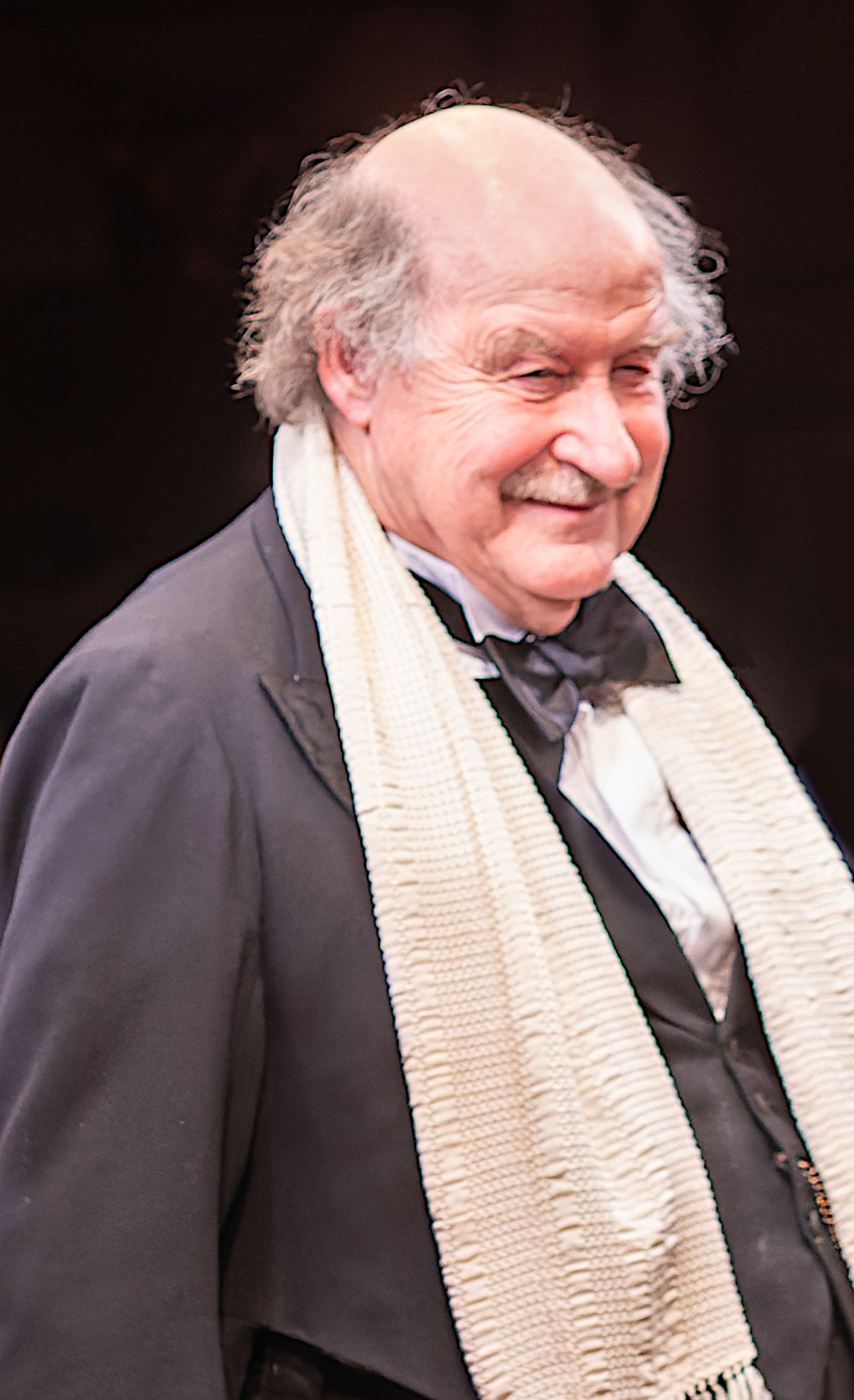
- David Horovitch
  Mellos (portrayed by David Horovitch) is the Grand Maester on the Small Council of King Viserys I Targaryen and also serves as his personal physician. During the birth of Viserys' son Prince Baelon Targaryen, Viserys requests him to perform a C-section on Queen Aemma Arryn, which results in her death. He later brews and delivers moon tea, which is used to abort pregnancies, to Princess Rhaenyra Targaryen on the orders of Viserys, following her exploits with her uncle Prince Daemon Targaryen. Mellos dies off-screen of unknown causes, and Orwyle succeeds him as Grand Maester.
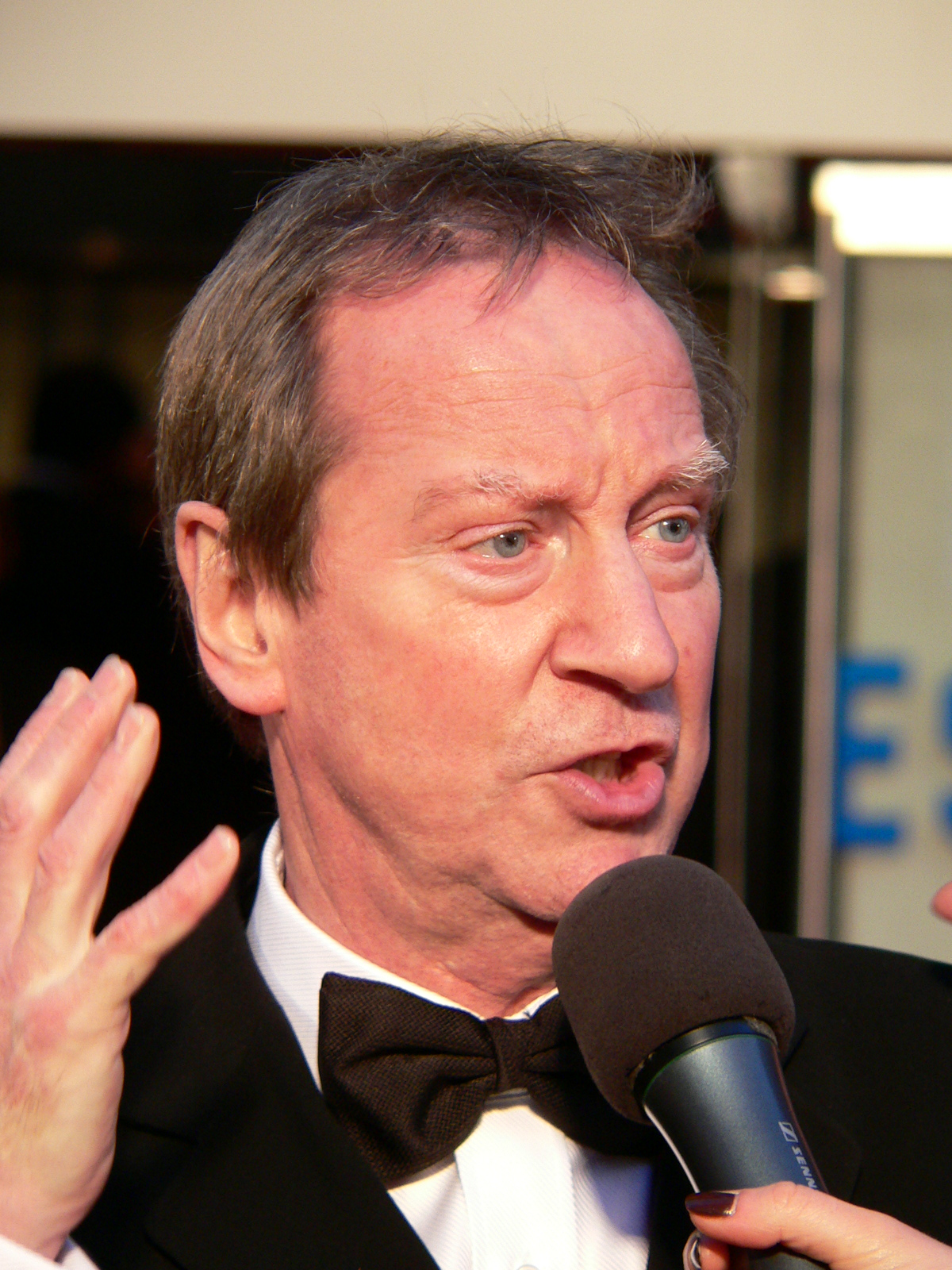
- Bill Paterson
  Lyman Beesbury (portrayed by Bill Paterson) is the Lord of Honeyholt and head of House Beesbury of the Reach. He serves as the Master of Coin on the Small Council of King Jaehaerys the Conciliator and King Viserys I Targaryen. Following Viserys' death, he openly opposes Ser Otto Hightower and the other Small Council members when it is revealed that they have conspired to crown Prince Aegon Targaryen as king instead of the chosen heir, Princess Rhaenyra Targaryen. When he accuses them of treason, he is accidentally killed by Ser Criston Cole when he shoves Lyman back into his seat, cracking his head on his marble of office, making him the first death during the Dance of the Dragons. In season 2, outraged by Lyman's death, House Beesbury pledges their allegiance to Rhaenyra and directly opposes House Hightower.
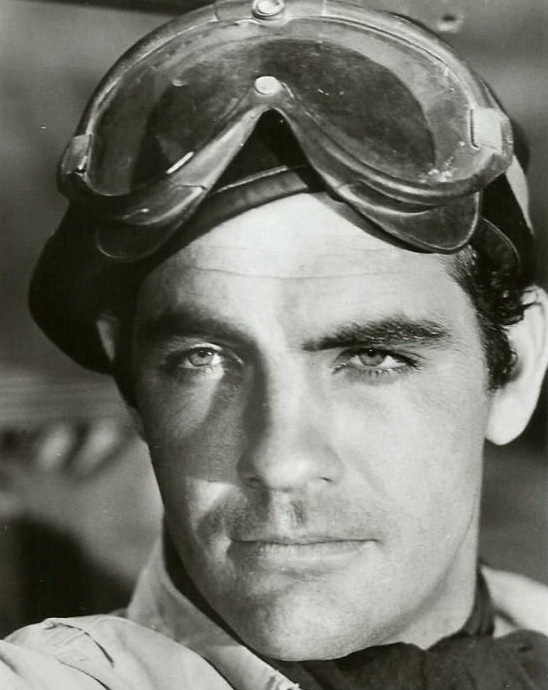
- Gary Raymond
  The High Septon (portrayed by Gary Raymond) serves as the head of the Faith of the Seven during the reigns of King Jaehaerys the Conciliator and King Viserys I Targaryen. During the Great Council at Harrenhal, he announces that Viserys was chosen as the heir to succeed his grandfather on the Iron Throne. Eleven years later, he attends the ceremony where Princess Rhaenyra Targaryen is chosen as Viserys' heir. Two years later, he officiates the marriage ceremony of Rhaenyra and Ser Laenor Velaryon. He dies off-screen of unknown causes, and Eustace succeeds him as High Septon.
- Randyll Barret (portrayed by Frankie Wilson) is a captain of the City Watch of King's Landing during the reign of King Viserys I Targaryen. Under the order of his commander, Prince Daemon Targaryen, he rounds up thieves, rapists, and murderers and carries out appropriate punishments.
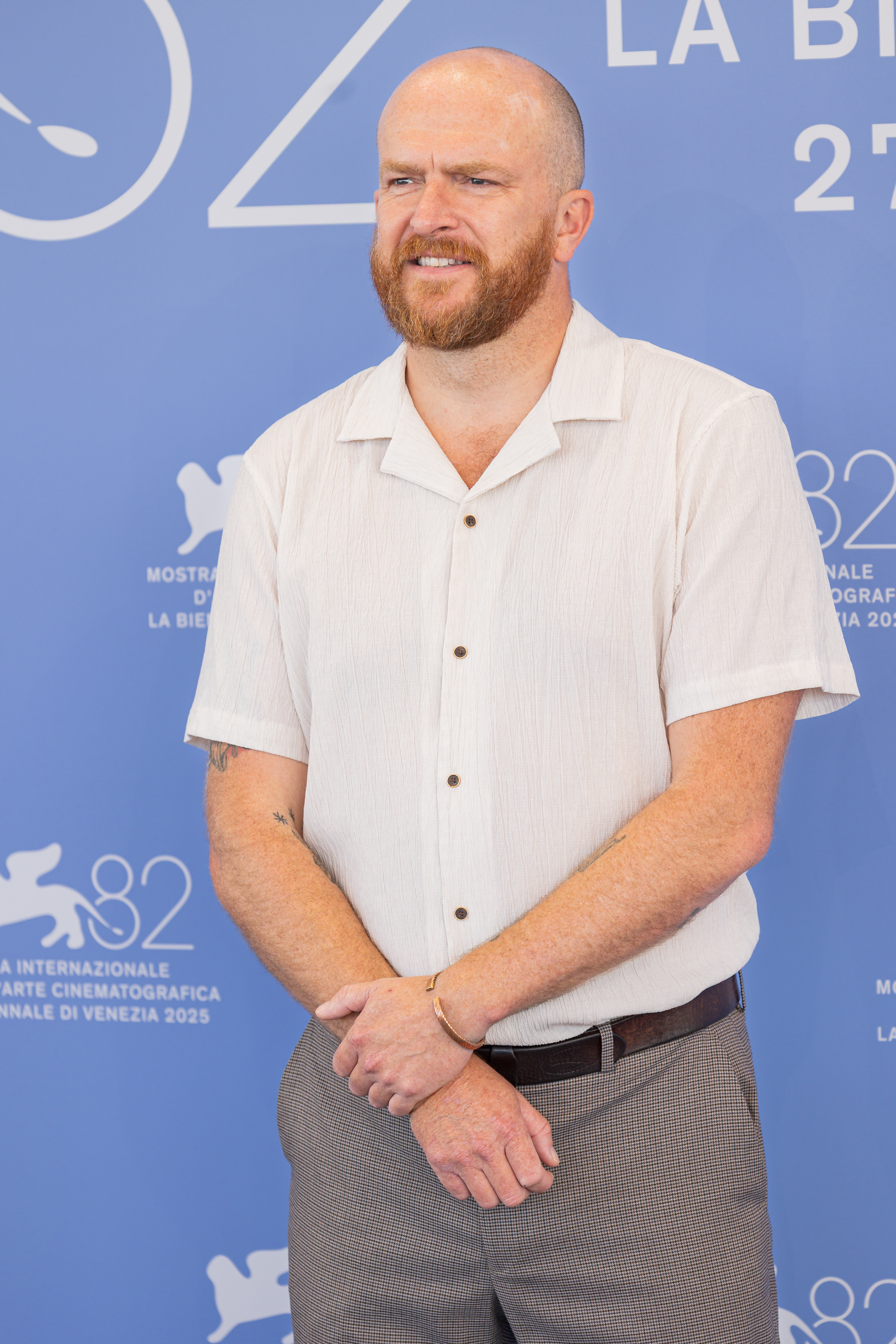
- Edward Rowe
  Howland Sharp (portrayed by Edward Rowe) is the Royal Huntsman serving House Targaryen during the reign of King Viserys I Targaryen. He oversees the royal hunt in the Kingswood during the second nameday celebrations for Prince Aegon Targaryen and informs Viserys of the significance of the white hart, a rare type of deer that symbolises royalty.
- Jasper Wylde (portrayed by Paul Kennedy), also known as "Ironrod", is the Lord of Rain House and head of House Wylde of the Stormlands. He serves as the successor to Lord Lyonel Strong as the Master of Laws on the Small Council of King Viserys I Targaryen and King Aegon II Targaryen. After the immediate death of Viserys, Jasper is revealed to be part of a scheme to crown Aegon as king, and is threatened by Queen Alicent Hightower when he defends their reasoning to not include her in their plans. In season 2, following the Battle of the Burning Mill, Jasper dismisses the conflict as a consequence of the ancient feud between House Blackwood and House Bracken. He also insultingly derides the elderly Lord Grover Tully when Orwyle proposes asking for his support, and instead supports the notion of sending word to Lord Ormund Hightower to bring House Hightower forces to help control the Riverlands. Following the Battle at Rook's Rest, when selecting a regent to take over while Aegon recovers, Jasper puts forward Prince Aemond Targaryen as a candidate, who is ultimately chosen. After receiving no word from Lord Dalton Greyjoy, who was approached to fill the vacant position of Master of Ships, Jasper proposes marrying Alicent to him, which she vehemently objects to. Jasper later heard a rumor that the dragon Seasmoke has been claimed and chooses to confide in Lord Larys Strong, who dismisses the rumor due to the fact it had been passed through word of mouth. He informs Aemond that Tessarion, the dragon bonded to his younger brother Prince Daeron Targaryen, is now big enough to fly and that he will be joining the House Hightower forces as they march to war. He later informs Aemond that numerous Targaryen bastards were ferried to Dragonstone. Angered by this, Aemond orders him to enforce an inspection for all ships entering and departing King's Landing, even after Jasper points out this would disrupt the fishing boats that feed the smallfolk. In season 3, in the aftermath of Aegon fleeing King's Landing, Jasper reports that Larys has fled with him, preventing Aemond from beheading Orwyle. When Alicent makes preparations for Rhaenyra to take King's Landing, he attempts to sexually assault the queen but is stopped and arrested by Orwyle, who then offers him in exchange for his own life. Jasper is then dragged into the throne room and beheaded by Daemon Targaryen.
- Allun Caswell (portrayed by Paul Hickey) is the Lord of Bitterbridge and head of House Caswell of the Reach. Following King Viserys I Targaryen's death, he is at court among numerous other lords and ladies and reluctantly bends the knee after witnessing Lord Merryweather and Lady Fell be imprisoned for refusing to recognize King Aegon II Targaryen as king. Due to his support of Princess Rhaenyra Targaryen, he attempts to flee King's Landing but is apprehended by Lord Larys Strong. He is later hanged and labeled a traitor as a warning to those who refuse to swear fealty to Aegon.
- High Septon Eustace (portrayed by Simon Chandler) serves as the head of the Faith of the Seven during the reigns of Viserys I Targaryen and Aegon II Targaryen. Following the death of Viserys, Eustace anoints Aegon II with sacred oils during his coronation. In season 3, after Rhaenyra takes King's Landing, Eustace refuses to anoint Rhaenyra with sacred oils for her coronation, claiming that until there is proof of Aegon's death, he cannot anoint his successor. When she claims that Aegon is dead, Eustace doubts her, stating that his gods "do not deal in dragons" and warns her not to make an enemy of the Faith. Rhaenyra later attempts to force Eustace to anoint her, but having received news of Aegon's survival, he refuses once again. Rhaenyra then has Alyn of Hull kill Eustace, despite his warning that this will declare war on the Faith.
- Lady Fell (portrayed by Miriam Lucia) is the Lady of Felwood and head of House Fell of the Stormlands. Following King Viserys I Targaryen's death, she is at court among numerous other lords and ladies and refuses to recognize King Aegon II Targaryen as king, and is subsequently imprisoned alongside Lord Merryweather for treason. In season 3, after Rhaenyra takes King's Landing, Daemon frees her from the black cells and Rhaenyra thanks Lady Fell for her loyalty.
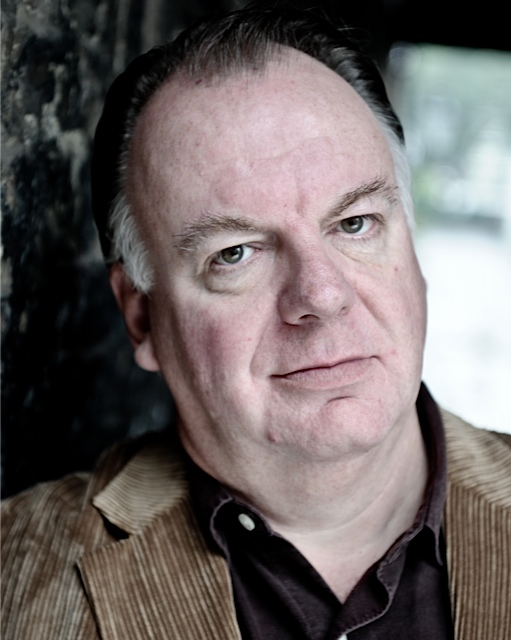
- Paul Clayton
  Lord Merryweather (portrayed by Paul Clayton) is the Lord of Longtable and head of House Merryweather of the Reach. Following King Viserys I Targaryen's death, he is at court among numerous other lords and ladies and refuses to recognize King Aegon II Targaryen as king. After he attempts to leave, he is subsequently imprisoned alongside Lady Fell for treason. In season 3, after Rhaenyra takes King's Landing, Daemon frees him from the black cells and Rhaenyra thanks Lord Merryweather for his loyalty.
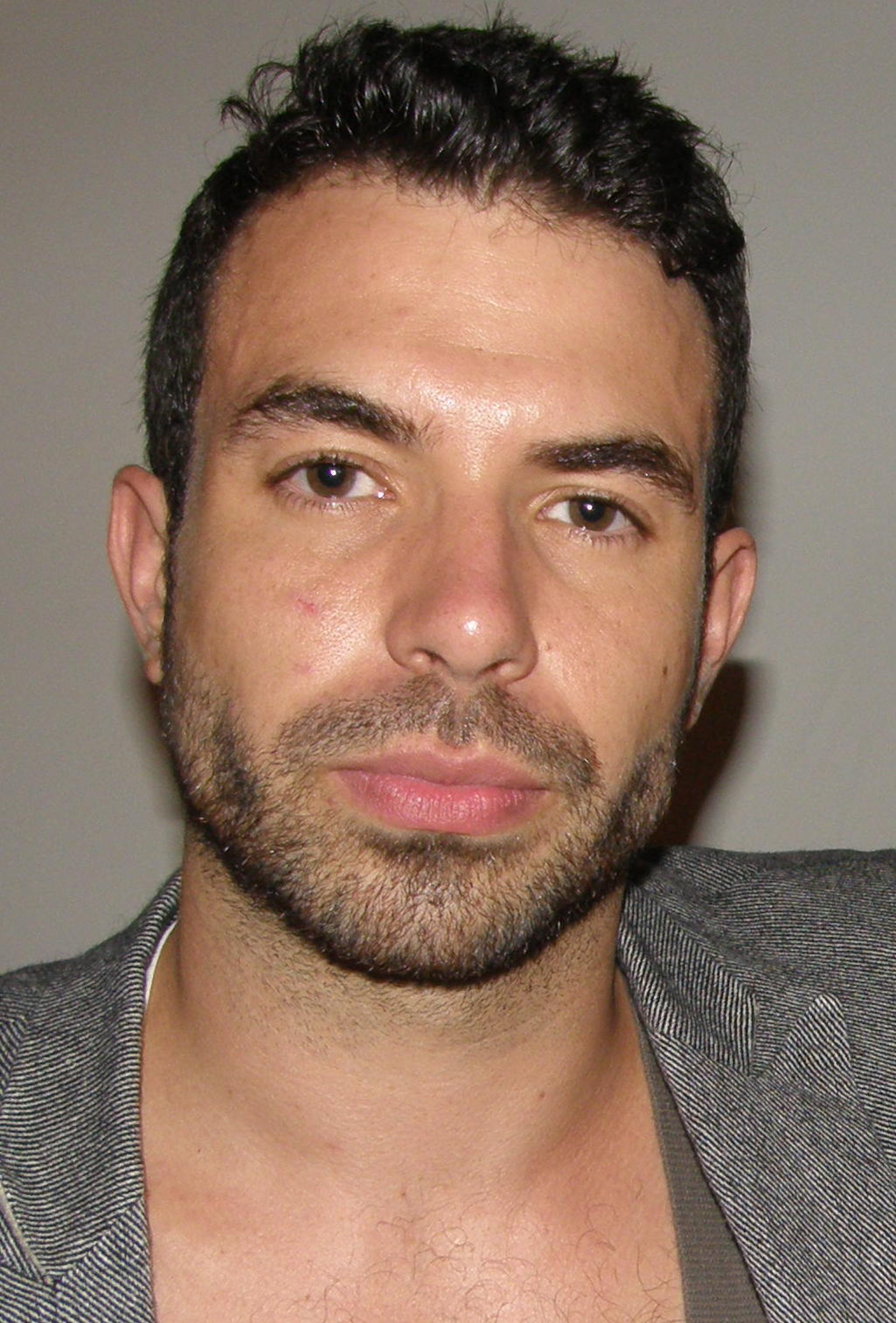
- Tom Cullen
  Luthor Largent (portrayed by Tom Cullen) is the commander of the City Watch of King's Landing during the reign of King Aegon II Targaryen. Having served under Daemon Targaryen when he was the commander of the City Watch during the reign of Viserys I Targaryen, he supports Rhaenyra Targaryen and his former commander when they arrive to take King's Landing. He temporarily serves as Rhaenyra's sworn sword afterwards until she appoints new Queensguard to protect her. He is dispatched to round up dissenters in the city streets who had been creating graffiti that insults Rhaenyra's children, and deals out harsh punishments. After multiple City Watchmen are killed in gruesome ways, Luthor asks for Daemon's help and requests that the City Watch receive their delayed pay to stop men from deserting, despite the city's inability to pay them. Luthor then helps Daemon torture one of the killers, and learns that Ormund Hightower is paying for the death of anyone in the City Watch loyal to Daemon. Daemon later returns to see Luthor, only to find both him and several other City Watchmen disembowled, throats and eyes cut, with their bodies displayed as partaking in a "traitor's feast".
- Lord Gaunt (portrayed by Peter Polycarpou) is the head of House Gaunt of the Crownlands. When Rhaenyra Targaryen holds a feast for the nobility of King's Landing, she punishes them for hoarding food from the smallfolk by serving them rats and having their homes raided by the City Watch.
- Lady Gaskell (portrayed by Abigail Thaw) is the head of House Gaskell of the Crownlands. When Rhaenyra Targaryen holds a feast for the nobility of King's Landing, she punishes them for hoarding food from the smallfolk by serving them rats and having their homes raided by the City Watch.
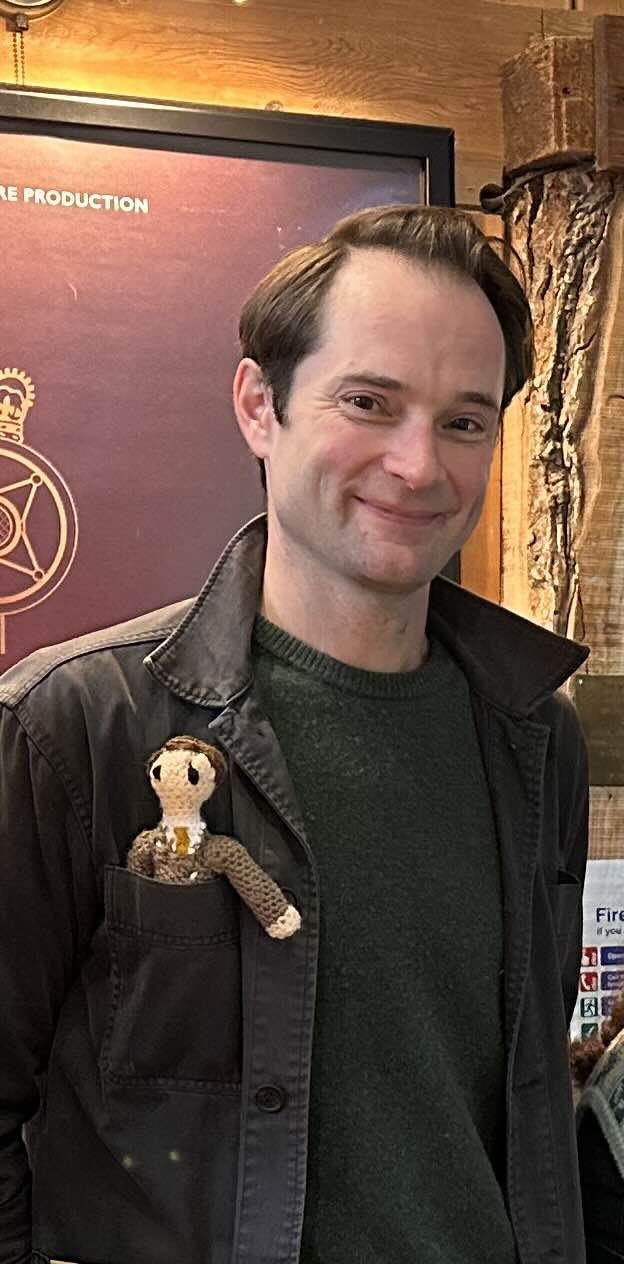
- Peter Sandys-Clarke
  Lord Bywater (portrayed by Peter Sandys-Clarke) is the head of House Bywater of the Crownlands. When Rhaenyra Targaryen holds a feast for the nobility of King's Landing, she punishes them for hoarding food from the smallfolk by serving them rats and having their homes raided by the City Watch.

=== Dragonstone ===
- Elinda Massey (portrayed by Jordon Stevens) is the daughter of Lord Gormon Massey and a lady-in-waiting to Queen Rhaenyra Targaryen. She is present for the birth of Prince Joffrey Velaryon, and Rhaenyra's miscarriage following the news of her father's death. In season 2, when Ser Arryk Cargyll attempts to assassinate Rhaenyra, she escapes and gets assistance from Ser Lorent Marbrand and the household guard. She is later sent by Mysaria to sneak into King's Landing to meet with the barmaid Dyana and give her a message to help incite rumors among the smallfolk. She is later instructed to spread word throughout King's Landing that any bastards of Targaryen descent will be snuck out of the city and taken to Dragonstone to try and claim a dragon. In season 3, Elinda reunites with Rhaenyra after she takes King's Landing and assists her in preparing for her first appearance in court. She later informs Rhaenyra of Joffrey's arrival in King's Landing, and takes care of him in Rhaenyra's absence.
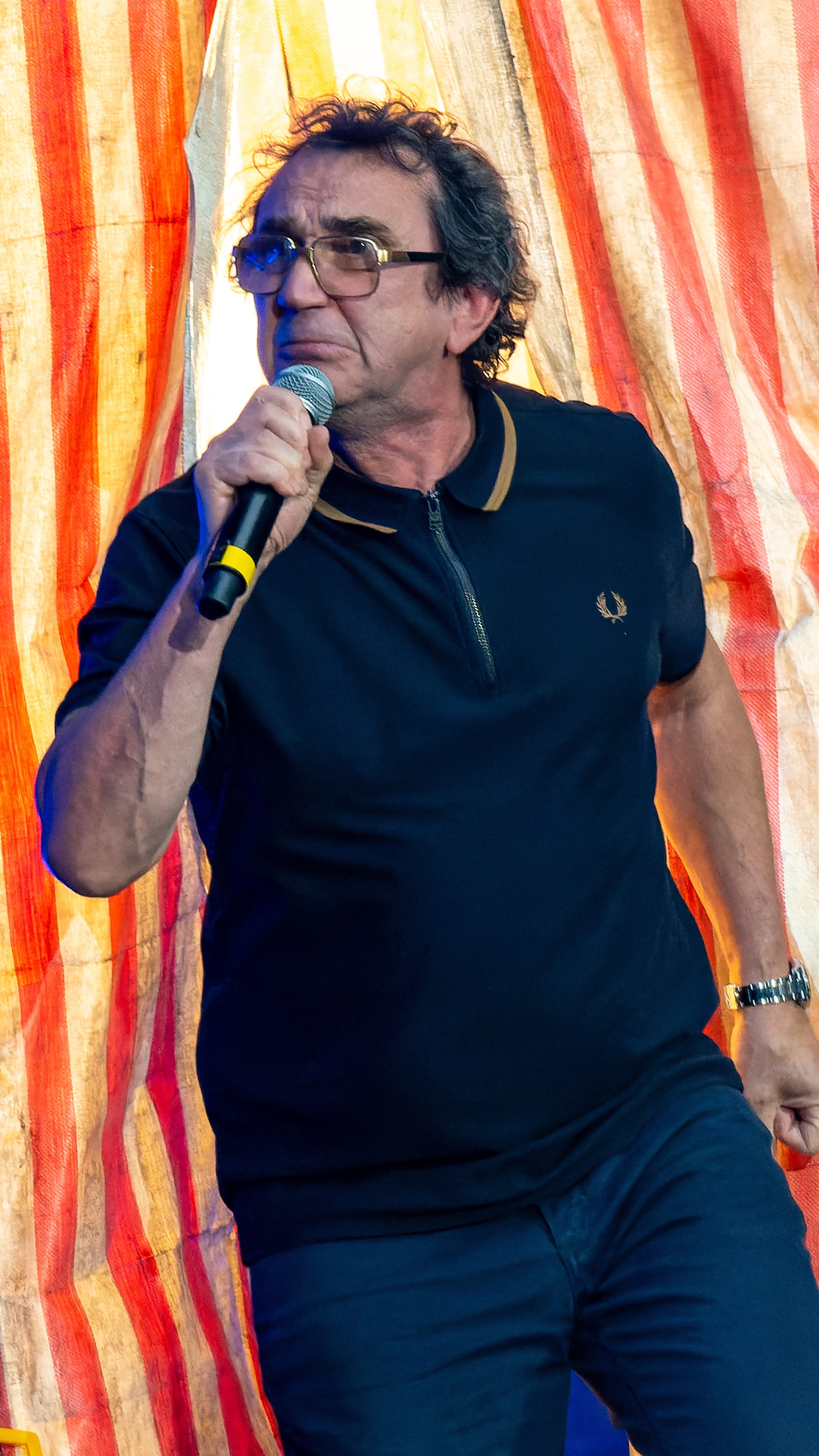
- Phil Daniels
  Gerardys (portrayed by Phil Daniels) is the Maester of Dragonstone serving House Targaryen who advises Queen Rhaenyra Targaryen as part of the Black Council. In season 2, Gerardys informs Rhaenyra of the murder of Prince Jaehaerys Targaryen and that it is widely believed that she ordered his death. After Addam of Hull manages to claim the dragon Seasmoke, Gerardys is instructed to teach him High Valyrian so he can issue the dragon commands. He later delivers Rhaenyra a message from Ser Simon Strong, who grew fearful that Prince Daemon Targaryen was going to betray her. In season 3, after Rhaenyra is locked in her chambers by Jacaerys before the Battle of the Gullet, Rhaenyra dismisses Gerardys from the Black Council for his silence while she grieves her son's death.
- Bartimos Celtigar (portrayed by Nicholas Jones) is the Lord of Claw Isle and head of House Celtigar of the Crownlands who serves on the Black Council. Like House Targaryen and House Velaryon, the Celtigars are of Valyrian descent. Following the death of King Viserys I Targaryen, he urges Queen Rhaenyra Targaryen to use their greater number of dragons to their advantage. In season 2, after the assassination attempt on Rhaenyra, Bartimos agrees with Lord Gormon Massey's suggestion that she leave Dragonstone for somewhere safer and have the Black Council rule in her stead, which she vehemently rejects. Following the Battle at Rook's Rest, Bartimos urges that while Vhagar recovers, they push to take King's Landing, as it wouldn't be expected of them. He strongly objects to Rhaenyra's proposal of allowing Ser Steffon Darklyn to attempt to claim a dragon. After Steffon's death, he continues to question Rhaenyra's decision-making and is struck by her in front of the castle servants and guards. Bartimos once again objects to Addam of Hull claiming the dragon Seasmoke, insulted by the fact that a lowborn man could claim a dragon. In season 3, after Rhaenyra is locked in her chambers by Jacaerys before the Battle of the Gullet, Rhaenyra dismisses Bartimos from the Black Council for his silence while she grieves her son's death.
- Simon Staunton (portrayed by Michael Elwyn) is the Lord of Rook's Rest and head of House Staunton of the Crownlands who serves on the Black Council. In season 2, after Lady Baela Targaryen informs the Black Council of Ser Criston Cole leading an army into the Crownlands, Simon requests to leave Dragonstone so he can return home to defend Rook's Rest, which he believes will be a likely target due to it being on the mainland. Simon's assumption was proven correct when Criston and his growing army laid siege during the Battle at Rook's Rest. He leads the defense of Rook's Rest and witnesses the dragon battle between Princess Rhaenys Targaryen, King Aegon II Targaryen, and Prince Aemond Targaryen. Following the battle and Rook's Rest being reduced to ruins, Simon's fate is unknown.
- Alfred Broome (portrayed by Jamie Kenna) is a household knight of House Targaryen who serves on the Black Council. Following the murder of Prince Jaehaerys Targaryen, he proposes that Rhaenyra take credit for the killing as an act of vengeance for the recent death of her son but is quickly rebuked. Following the Battle of the Burning Mill, he insists that Rhaenyra utilize all her dragons to their immediate advantage, ignorant of the devastation it may cause. Alfred later reprimands Lady Baela Targaryen for not using Moondancer to kill Ser Criston Cole and further urges that they send dragons to defend Rook's Rest after receiving news regarding the Sack of Duskendale. After the Battle at Rook's Rest, Rhaenyra sends Alfred to Harrenhal in an attempt to convince Prince Daemon Targaryen to communicate with her once again. Disappointed with Rhaenyra's inaction, Alfred arrives at Harrenhal, privately meets with Daemon in Harrenhal's godswood, and tries to persuade him to claim the throne for himself. After Rhaenyra arrives at Harrenhal, having been informed of Daemon's meeting with Alfred by Ser Simon Strong, he watches as Daemon pledges himself and his army of rivermen to Rhaenyra and her claim to the throne, causing Alfred to flee.
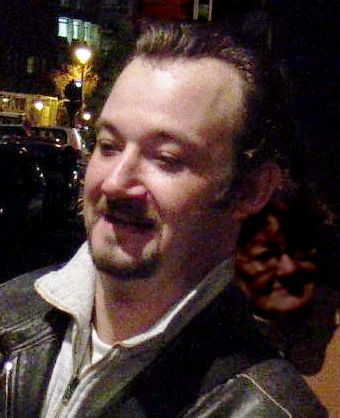
- James Dreyfus
  Gormon Massey (portrayed by James Dreyfus) is the father of Elinda Massey. He is the Lord of Stonedance and head of House Massey of the Crownlands who serves on the Black Council. After the assassination attempt on Queen Rhaenyra Targaryen, Gormon suggests that she leave Dragonstone for somewhere safer and have the Black Council rule in her stead, which she vehemently rejects. In season 3, after Rhaenyra takes King's Landing, Gormon no longer serves on the Black Council.
- Gunthor Darklyn (portrayed by Steven Pacey) is the father of Ser Steffon Darklyn. He is the Lord of Duskendale and head of House Darklyn of the Crownlands. Following the Sack of Duskendale, he refuses to swear fealty to King Aegon II Targaryen and is executed by Ser Criston Cole, leading his remaining forces to surrender and join Criston's army.

=== The Kingsguard / Queensguard ===
- Ryam Redwyne (portrayed by Garry Cooper) is the aging Lord Commander of the Kingsguard under King Jaehaerys the Conciliator and King Viserys I Targaryen. Ryam dies off-screen of natural causes, and Ser Harrold Westerling succeeds him as Lord Commander.
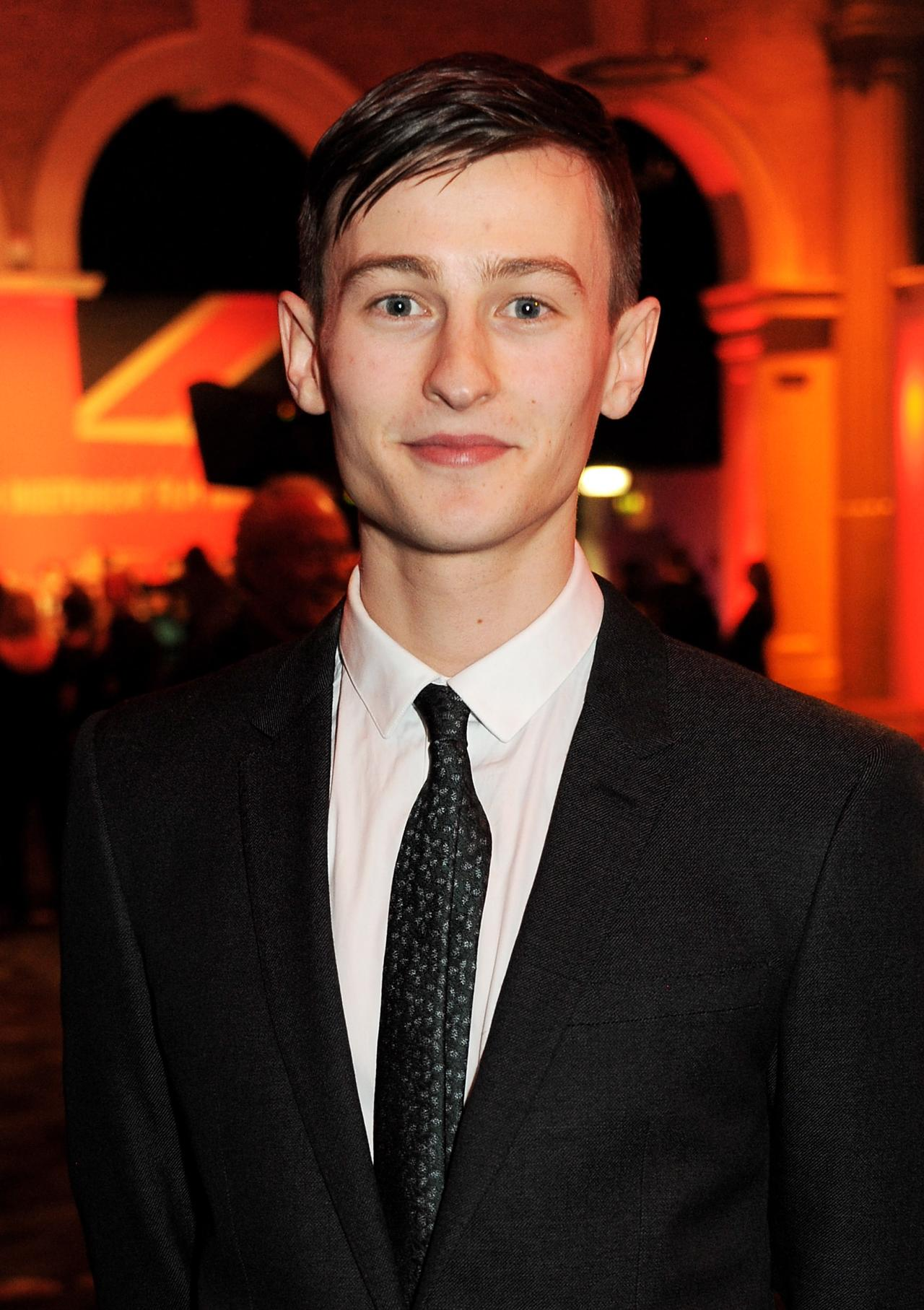
- Elliott Tittensor
  Erryk Cargyll (portrayed by Elliott Tittensor) is the twin brother of Ser Arryk Cargyll. He is a member of King Viserys I Targaryen's Kingsguard and later a member of Queen Rhaenyra Targaryen's Queensguard. Erryk accompanies Arryk in their search for Prince Aegon Targaryen, on the orders of Ser Otto Hightower, so that he may be crowned king. Erryk quickly becomes disgusted by the actions of the Small Council and their plot to crown Aegon as king. He steals Viserys' crown and frees Princess Rhaenys Targaryen from her house arrest so that she can escape King's Landing on her dragon Meleys. Erryk then travels alone to Dragonstone and delivers Rhaenyra her father's crown, swears his allegiance to her, and serves on the Black Council. In season 2, Erryk uncovers Mysaria on a ship after she had fled King's Landing and brings her to Dragonstone. He is later warned by Mysaria that Arryk had snuck onto Dragonstone in an attempt to assassinate Rhaenyra. After confronting and killing his brother, Erryk impales himself on his sword in grief. Erryk and Arryk are then buried together on Dragonstone.
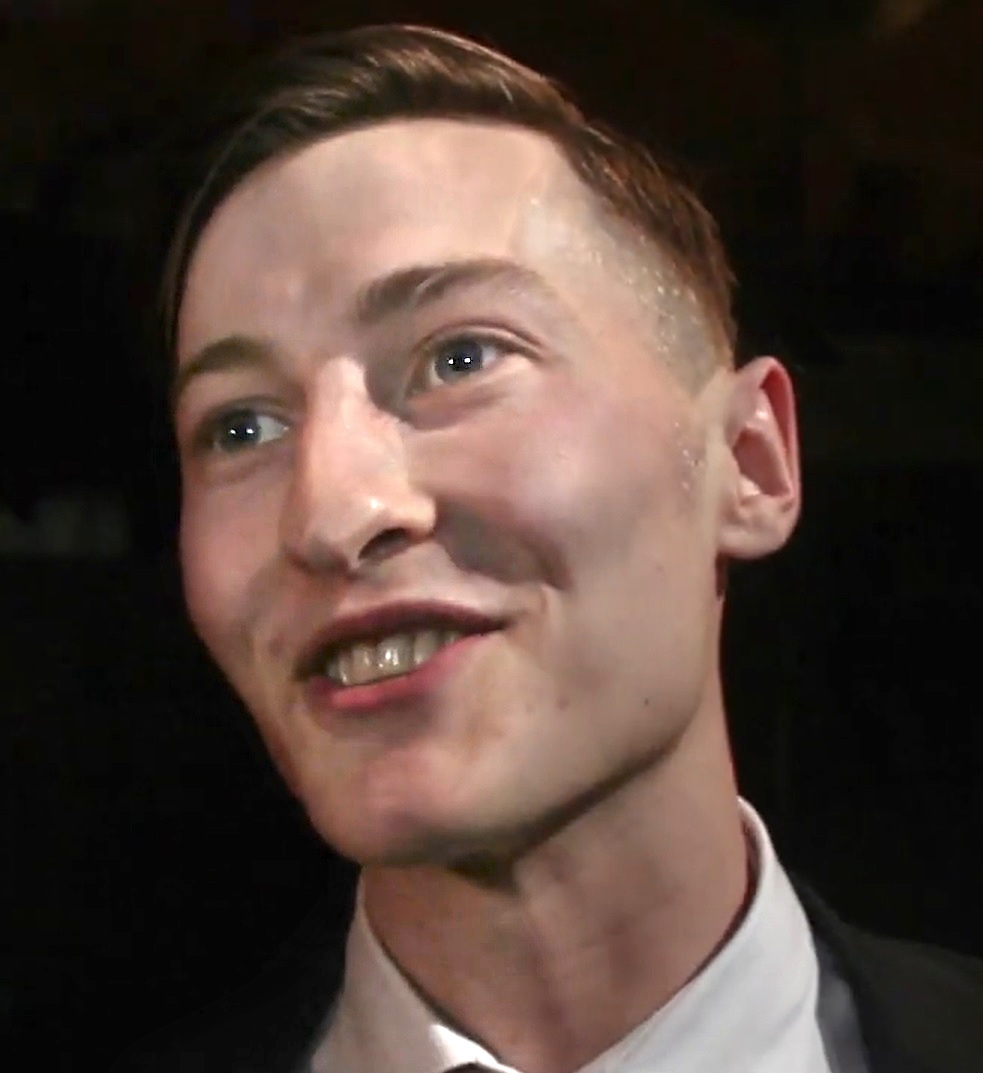
- Luke Tittensor
  Arryk Cargyll (portrayed by Luke Tittensor) is the twin brother of Ser Erryk Cargyll. He is a member of the Kingsguard under King Viserys I Targaryen and King Aegon II Targaryen. Following the death of Viserys, Ser Otto Hightower orders Arryk and his brother to locate Aegon. In season 2, following the murder of Prince Jaehaerys Targaryen, Ser Criston Cole sends Arryk to assassinate Queen Rhaenyra Targaryen by disguising himself as his brother, but he is confronted and killed by Erryk, who commits suicide soon after. Erryk and Arryk are then buried together on Dragonstone.
- Steffon Darklyn (portrayed by Anthony Flanagan) is the son of Lord Gunthor Darklyn. He is a member of the Kingsguard under King Jaehaerys the Conciliator and King Viserys I Targaryen and later serves as the Lord Commander of Queen Rhaenyra Targaryen's Queensguard. After Viserys' death, he swears his allegiance to Rhaenyra alongside Ser Lorent Marbrand and serves on the Black Council. In season 2, he accompanies Rhaenyra disguised as a septon when she infiltrates King's Landing to speak to Queen Alicent Hightower. When he returns with Rhaenyra to Dragonstone, he receives news that his father has been killed following the Sack of Duskendale. Due to his distant Targaryen ancestor and the potential for him to still have Valyrian blood, Rhaenyra requests that he attempt to bond with the unclaimed dragon Seasmoke. Steffon willingly agrees, and after Seasmoke is called to Dragonstone by a group of dragonkeepers, he is unsuccessful at bonding with the dragon and is burned alive.
- Lorent Marbrand (portrayed by Max Wrottesley) is a member of King Viserys I Targaryen's Kingsguard and later a member of Queen Rhaenyra Targaryen's Queensguard. After Viserys' death, he swears his allegiance to Rhaenyra alongside Ser Steffon Darklyn and serves on the Black Council. In season 2, he is alerted to Ser Arryk Cargyll's assassination attempt on Rhaenyra and comes to protect her. Fearful of future assassination attempts, he becomes Rhaenyra's sworn sword and remains by her side. In season 3, when word reaches Dragonstone that the Triarchy intends to attack the Velaryon fleet, Jacaerys Velaryon orders Lorent to lock Rhaenyra in her chambers to prevent her from riding into battle and being put in harm's way. After being threatened by Jacaerys, Lorent obeys and refuses to free Rhaenyra when she requests him to. Rhaenyra views Lorent's actions as treason following Jace's death, and after he offers his life for the apparent betrayal, she dismisses him from her service and says Lorent can "choose how he will die".
- Martyn Reyne (portrayed by Barney Fishwick) is a companion and flatterer of King Aegon II Targaryen, whom he personally appoints to the Kingsguard following the defection of three Kingsguard to Queen Rhaenyra Targaryen's Queensguard. After the smallfolk begin rioting in King's Landing when Queen Rhaenyra Targaryen sends shipments of food to the starving city, he refuses orders to sheathe his sword and attacks the smallfolk before he is overwhelmed. For his actions during the riot, Martyn is expelled from the Kingsguard by Prince Aemond Targaryen but is spared from execution and is sentenced to join the Night's Watch at the Wall alongside Ser Eddard Waters.
- Leon Estermont (portrayed by Ralph Davis) is a companion and flatterer of King Aegon II Targaryen, whom he personally appoints to the Kingsguard following the defection of three Kingsguard to Queen Rhaenyra Targaryen's Queensguard. After the smallfolk begin rioting in King's Landing when Queen Rhaenyra Targaryen sends shipments of food to the starving city, Leon maims a rioter and is quickly overwhelmed and stabbed to death.
- Eddard Waters (portrayed by Tok Stephen), also known as "Red Ned", is a hedge knight, companion, and flatterer of King Aegon II Targaryen, whom he personally appoints to the Kingsguard following the defection of three Kingsguard to Queen Rhaenyra Targaryen's Queensguard. After the smallfolk begin rioting in King's Landing when Queen Rhaenyra Targaryen sends shipments of food to the starving city, he refuses orders to sheathe his sword and attacks the smallfolk before he is overwhelmed. For his actions during the riot, Eddard is expelled from the Kingsguard by Prince Aemond Targaryen but is spared from execution and is sentenced to join the Night's Watch at the Wall alongside Ser Martyn Reyne.
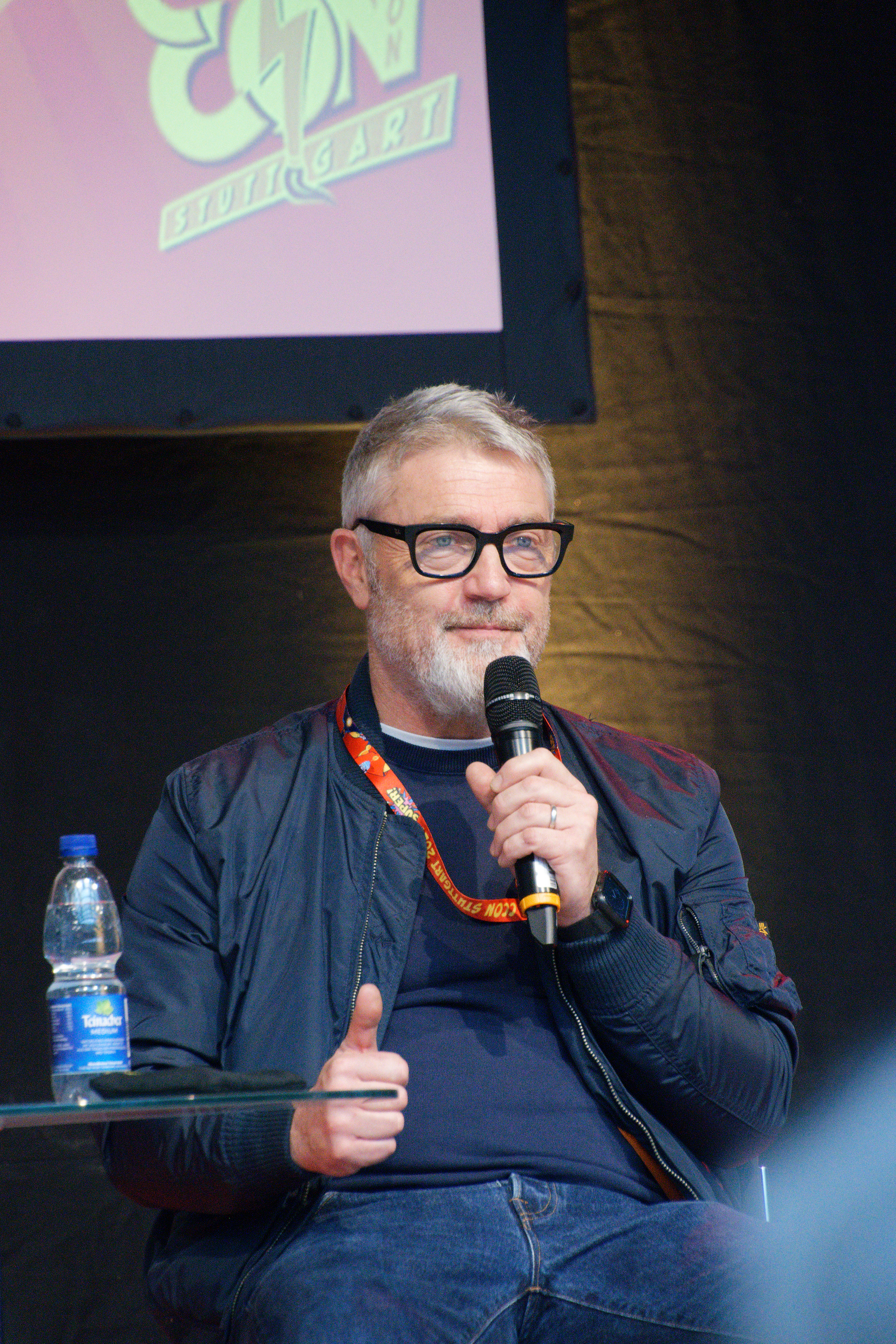
- Vincent Regan
  Rickard Thorne (portrayed by Vincent Regan) is a member of King Aegon II Targaryen's Kingsguard who serves as Queen Alicent Hightower's royal protector. After the smallfolk begin rioting in King's Landing when Queen Rhaenyra Targaryen sends shipments of food to the starving city, Rickard escorts Alicent and Queen Helaena Targaryen from the Grand Sept to safety and is forced to abandon his fellow Kingsguard after they attack the rioters and become overwhelmed. He is later trusted by Alicent to escort her into the Kingswood so she can escape from King's Landing and spend some time alone and away from the city. He later escorts Alicent to Dragonstone so she can meet with Queen Rhaenyra Targaryen in secret. In season 3, when Rhaenyra takes King's Landing, Rickard defends the Iron Throne with several Hightower guards. After the arrival of the City Watch, who support Rhaenyra and their former commander Daemon Targaryen, Rickard is forced to surrender and is arrested.
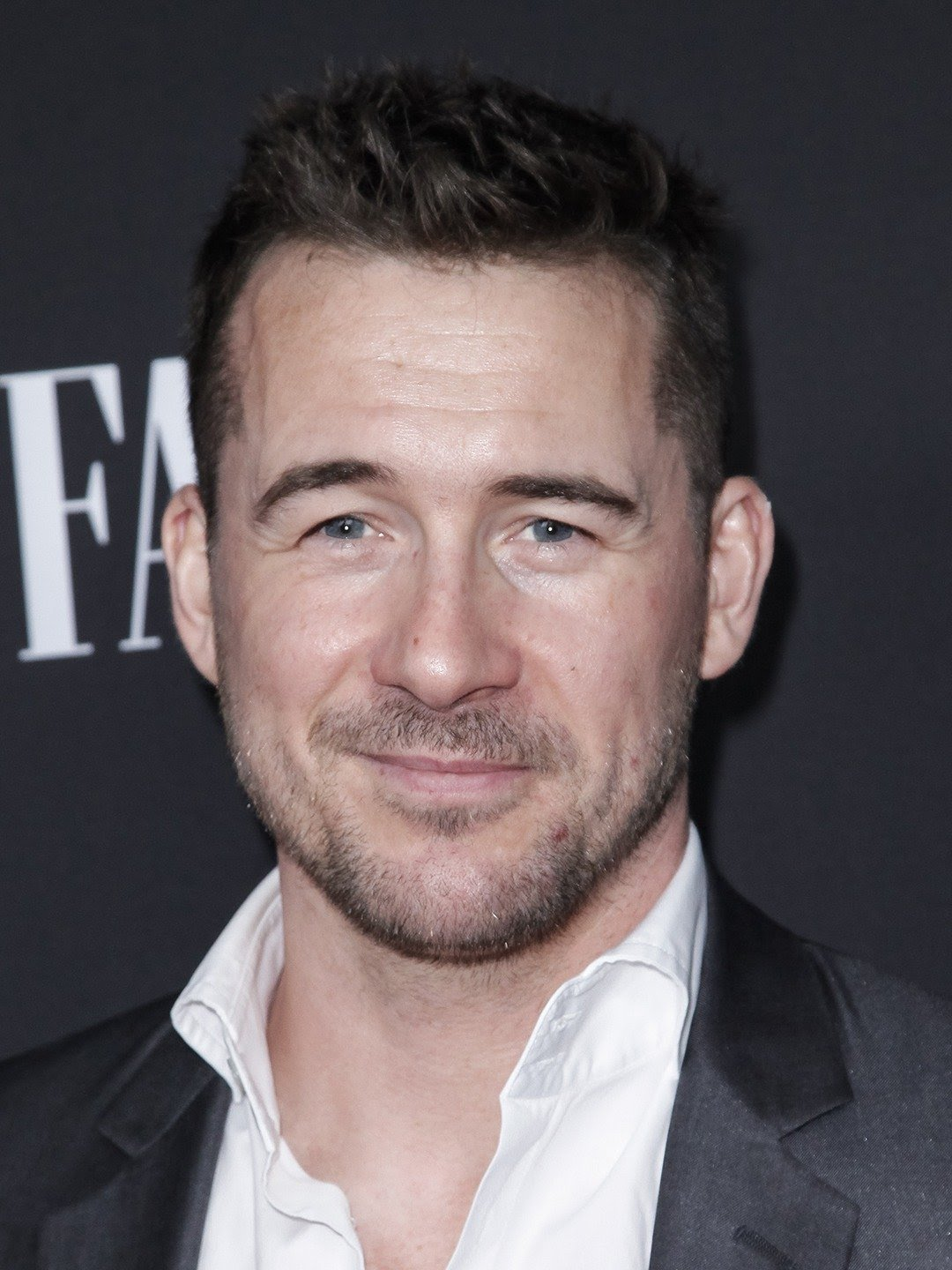
- Barry Sloane
  Adrian Redfort (portrayed by Barry Sloane) is a member of Queen Rhaenyra Targaryen's Queensguard. He is appointed to the Queensguard after Rhaenyra takes King's Landing and serves as her sworn sword. He is later sent with Alicent Hightower to Harrenhal, so Alicent can draw Aemond Targaryen out and have Adrian kill him. However, not trusting him, Aemond stabs Adrian in the neck, killing him.
- Lyonel Bentley (portrayed by Joe Gaminara) is a member of Queen Rhaenyra Targaryen's Queensguard. He is appointed to the Queensguard after Rhaenyra takes King's Landing. He is ordered to pose as an envoy from House Baratheon and goes to Tumbleton with the false Arrion Baratheon to assassinate Ormund Hightower and Daeron Targaryen. However, Gwayne Hightower deduces the ruse, and Lyonel is killed by Jon Roxton.

=== People of Westeros ===
- Rickon Stark (portrayed by David Hounslow) is the Lord of Winterfell, head of House Stark, and Warden of the North. He is the father of Cregan Stark. Alongside many other lords and ladies of Westeros, Rickon swears an oath to support Rhaenyra Targaryen's claim to the Iron Throne. Rickon dies off-screen of unknown causes, and Cregan succeeds him as Lord of Winterfell.
- Ceira Lannister (portrayed by Lucy Briers) is the mother of Jason Lannister and Tyland Lannister. During the second nameday celebrations for Aegon Targaryen, Ceira socializes with Alicent Hightower, Lynesse Hightower, and Joselyn Redwyne. Ceira and Joselyn openly condemn Daemon Targaryen's involvement in the War for the Stepstones, which upsets Rhaenyra Targaryen.
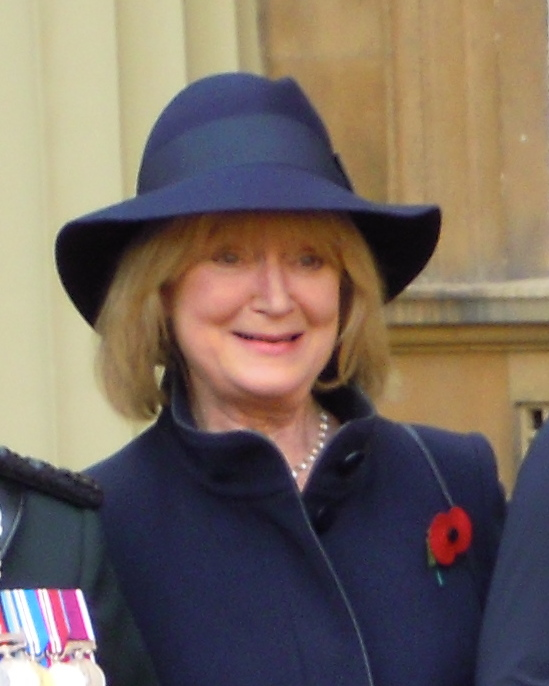
- Joanna David
  Joselyn Redwyne (portrayed by Joanna David) is the Lady of the Arbor and the head of House Redwyne of the Reach. During the second nameday celebrations for Aegon Targaryen, Joselyn socializes with Alicent Hightower, Lynesse Hightower, and Ceira Lannister. Joselyn and Ceira openly condemn Daemon Targaryen's involvement in the War for the Stepstones, which upsets Rhaenyra Targaryen.
- Dragonkeeper Elder (portrayed by Patrice Naiambana) is a dragonkeeper in King's Landing who only speaks in High Valyrian. He instructs Prince Jacaerys Targaryen on how to issue commands to his dragon Vermax. In season 3, six years later, he flees from Tumbleton after Lord Ormund Hightower seizes it with his army, and reports to Queen Rhaenyra Targaryen that Ormund has taken a young dragon within the town's walls.
- Dyana (portrayed by Maddie Evans) was a household servant of Prince Aegon Targaryen and Princess Helaena Targaryen. After she is raped by Aegon, Queen Alicent Hightower pays her to keep quiet. In season 2, she had since been dismissed from the Red Keep and had become a barmaid at a tavern in the Streets of Silk in King's Landing. She is later visited by Elinda Massey after she sneaks into King's Landing with a message from Mysaria to help incite rumors among the smallfolk.
- Sylvi (portrayed by Michelle Bonnard) is a brothel madam in the Streets of Silk in King's Landing who is frequently visited by Prince Aemond Targaryen. Following the death of King Viserys I Targaryen, Aemond takes Ser Criston Cole to Sylvi for information concerning Prince Aegon Targaryen's whereabouts, but she informs them that he isn't there. In season 2, Aemond visits Sylvi and expresses regret over his role in the death of Prince Lucerys Velaryon. While conversing with Ulf White in a tavern, she tells him about the lavish parties and banquets the upper class is having while the smallfolk are starving, leading to Ulf openly expressing his discontent on the city streets. In season 3, Sylvi witnesses the arrival of Rhaenyra and her dragons when she takes King's Landing. Sylvi later petitions Rhaenyra and asks for justice for the smallfolk as they starve while the city's nobility hoards food.
- Blood (portrayed by Sam C. Wilson) is a disgruntled member of the City Watch who has a strong dislike for House Hightower. He is still loyal to the former commander of the City Watch, Prince Daemon Targaryen, who hires him and the ratcatcher Cheese to infiltrate the Red Keep and assassinate Prince Aemond Targaryen. Unable to find Aemond, he and Cheese instead kill Prince Jaehaerys Targaryen and decapitate him. Blood is later discovered attempting to flee the Red Keep with Jaehaerys' severed head by Lord Larys Strong. He willingly admits that his accomplice is a ratcatcher, and is beaten to death by King Aegon II Targaryen, who sought vengeance for his son's murder.
- Cheese (portrayed by Mark Stobbart) is a ratcatcher who works in the Red Keep. Prince Daemon Targaryen hires him, and Blood, a City Watch guard, to infiltrate the Red Keep and assassinate Prince Aemond Targaryen. After he and Blood instead kill Prince Jaehaerys Targaryen, he flees the Red Keep. When Blood is apprehended and confesses that his accomplice was a ratcatcher, Cheese is among the ratcatchers of the Red Keep who are rounded up and hanged on the orders of King Aegon II Targaryen. Following his appointment as regent, Aemond orders the corpses of the ratcatchers to finally be cut down.
- Mujja (portrayed by Samson Kayo) is a denizen of King's Landing and a drinking companion of Ulf White. After hearing rumors that Queen Rhaenyra Targaryen was seeking Targaryen bastards to travel to Dragonstone, Mujja and Cley encourage Ulf to go and claim a dragon by reminding him of his purported Targaryen father. In season 3, Mujja witnesses the arrival of Rhaenyra and her dragons when she takes King's Landing. He and Cley later reunite with Ulf, and he requests that Ulf petition Rhaenyra for a house outside the town of Rosby.
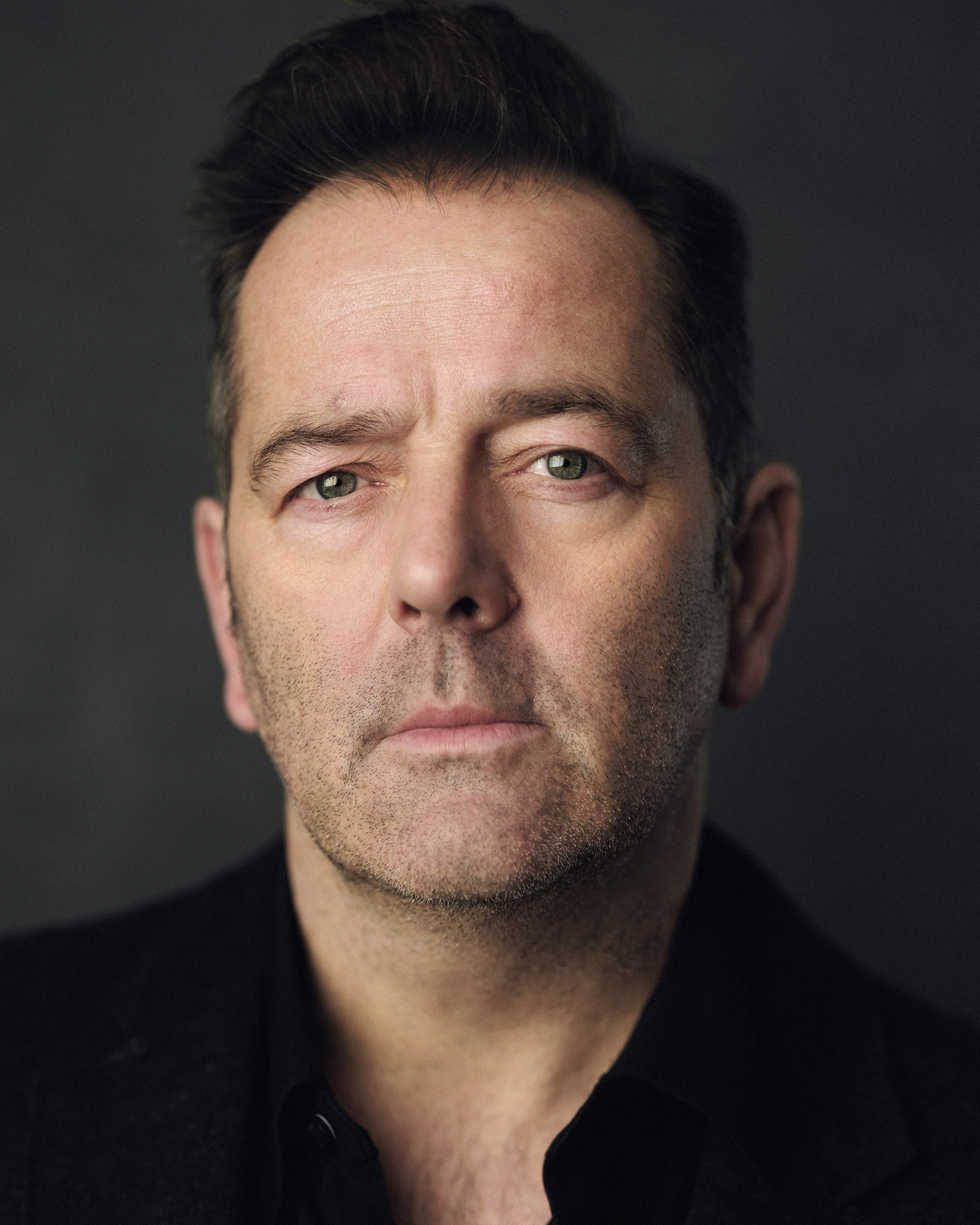
- James Doherty
  Cley (portrayed by James Doherty) is a denizen of King's Landing and a drinking companion of Ulf White. After hearing rumors that Queen Rhaenyra Targaryen was seeking Targaryen bastards to travel to Dragonstone, Mujja and Cley encourage Ulf to go and claim a dragon by reminding him of his purported Targaryen father. In season 3, Cley witnesses the arrival of Rhaenyra and her dragons when she takes King's Landing. He and Mujja later reunite with Ulf, and he requests that Ulf petition Rhaenyra for Cley to be pardoned of his petty crimes.
- Humfrey Lefford (portrayed by Daniel Fathers) is the Lord of the Golden Tooth and the head of House Lefford. In season 2, when Jason Lannister arrives with the Lannister army at the Golden Tooth, Humfrey hosts Jason while they await to receive word from Aemond Targaryen. He later marches into the Riverlands alongside Jason and his army. In season 3, following the defeat of the Lannister army by Daemon Targaryen's forces, Humfrey's fate is unknown.
- Silver Denys (portrayed by Robert Rhodes) is a dragonseed from King's Landing who travels to Dragonstone after learning that Queen Rhaenyra Targaryen is seeking Targaryen bastards in an attempt to find new dragonriders. During the Red Sowing, he is the first to step forward and attempt to claim the dragon Vermithor but is quickly burned alive.
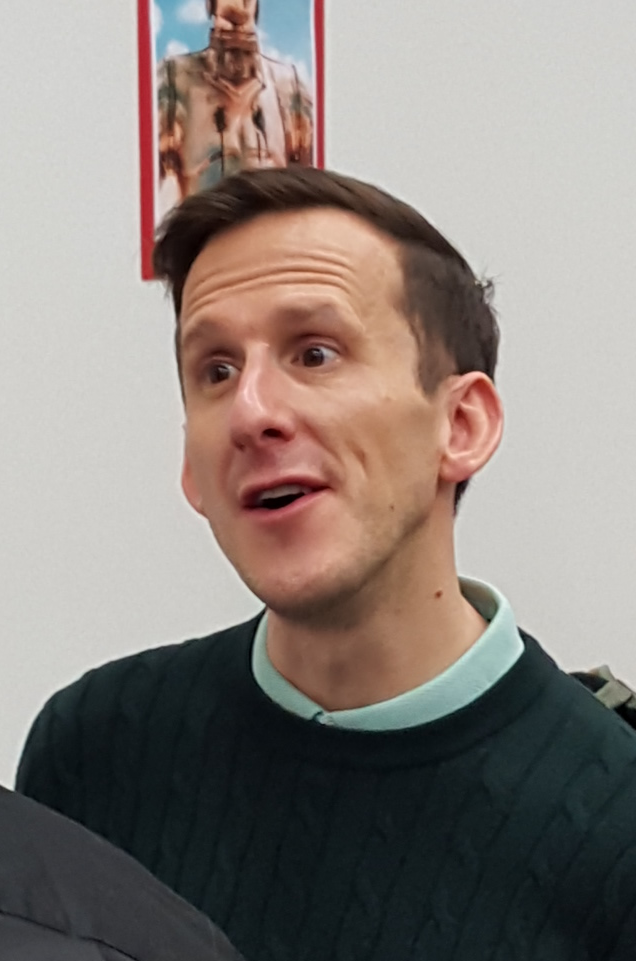
- Adam Brown
  Glendon Footly (portrayed by Adam Brown) is the Lord of Tumbleton and head of House Footly of the Reach. He is the husband of Sharis Footly. In season 3, after Ormund Hightower seizes Tumbleton, Glendon voices his concerns about the Hightower occupation but is dismissed. Following the Battle of Tumbleton, Glendon's fate is unknown.
- Sharis Footly (portrayed by Alexandra Moen) is the wife of Glendon Footly. In season 3, after Ormund Hightower seizes Tumbleton, Sharis asserts her family's support of Rhaenyra Targaryen before she is dismissed. Following the Battle of Tumbleton, Sharis' fate is unknown.
- Janos (portrayed by Oliver Coopersmith) is the leader of a group of refugees that occupy the ruins of Rook's Rest. When Larys Strong and Aegon II Targaryen arrive at Rook's Rest under the guise of survivors from Sharp Point, he sets them to work. He threatens Aegon after he raises his voice against Janos and makes him kiss his boot. Janos later finds Aegon's crown among his things, but Aegon quickly stabs him to death before Janos can expose his identity. Janos' body is later buried by Tyland Lannister to avoid Aegon from being discovered
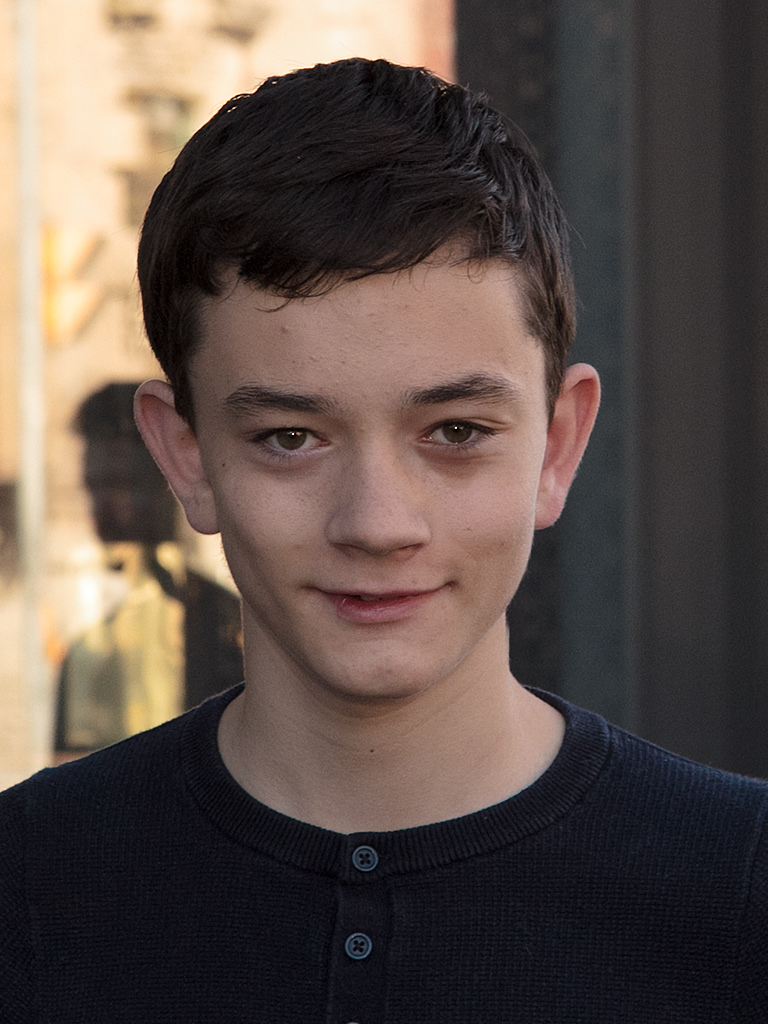
- Lewis MacDougall
  Tom Tangletongue (portrayed by Lewis MacDougall) is a refugee working for Janos at the ruins of Rook's Rest. He is known as "Tangletongue" due to his stuttering. He helps Aegon clean the latrines and attempts to befriend him after they both receive no food due to a shortage. He later flees Rook's Rest with the rest of the refugees due to an army from House Mooton marching through the area.
- Leo (portrayed by Abhin Galeya) is Kat's brother who lives in Tumbleton with his wife and children. After Leo is forced to let three Hightower soldiers share his home while they occupy the town, he defends Kat when the soldier Garrick assaults her. They later petition Ormund to have Garrick punished, which Lord Ormund Hightower agrees to, leading to Garrick being punished. He is later arrested and brought before Ormund, who forces Daeron to kill him. Leo's body is then burned and eaten by Tessarion.
- False Arrion Baratheon (portrayed by Will Stevens) is a knight serving Rhaenyra Targaryen. In season 3, he poses as Arrion Baratheon and is sent alongside Lyonel Bentley to assassinate Ormund Hightower and Daeron Targaryen, under the guise of swearing fealty to the latter, and they are covered in mud to disorientate Ormund's senses. Gwayne Hightower deduces the ruse on the basis that Arrion is more comely and slits the man's throat before he and Jon Roxton kill the rest of the assassins.

=== People of Essos ===
- Craghas Drahar (portrayed by Daniel Scott-Smith), also known as the "Crabfeeder", is a Myrish prince-admiral and leader of the Triarchy, a triple-alliance consisting of the free cities of Myr, Lys, and Tyrosh. He wages war against House Velaryon and their large fleet of ships during the War for the Stepstones, which disrupts the Westerosi sea trade. He became infamous for the practice of crucifying and feeding his captured enemies to crabs. During the climactic Siege of Bloodstone, he is bisected by Prince Daemon Targaryen, pushing the Triarchy back to Essos and bringing the war to an end.
- Reggio Haratis (portrayed by Dean Nolan) is the Prince of the Free City of Pentos. He hosts Prince Daemon Targaryen and his family and offers him a permanent residence and land in Pentos in exchange for military assistance in fending off the Triarchy. In season 2, he answers a letter sent by Lady Rhaena Targaryen and agrees to shelter the youngest sons of Queen Rhaenyra Targaryen, Prince Aegon "the Younger" Targaryen and Prince Viserys Targaryen, at his home in Pentos.
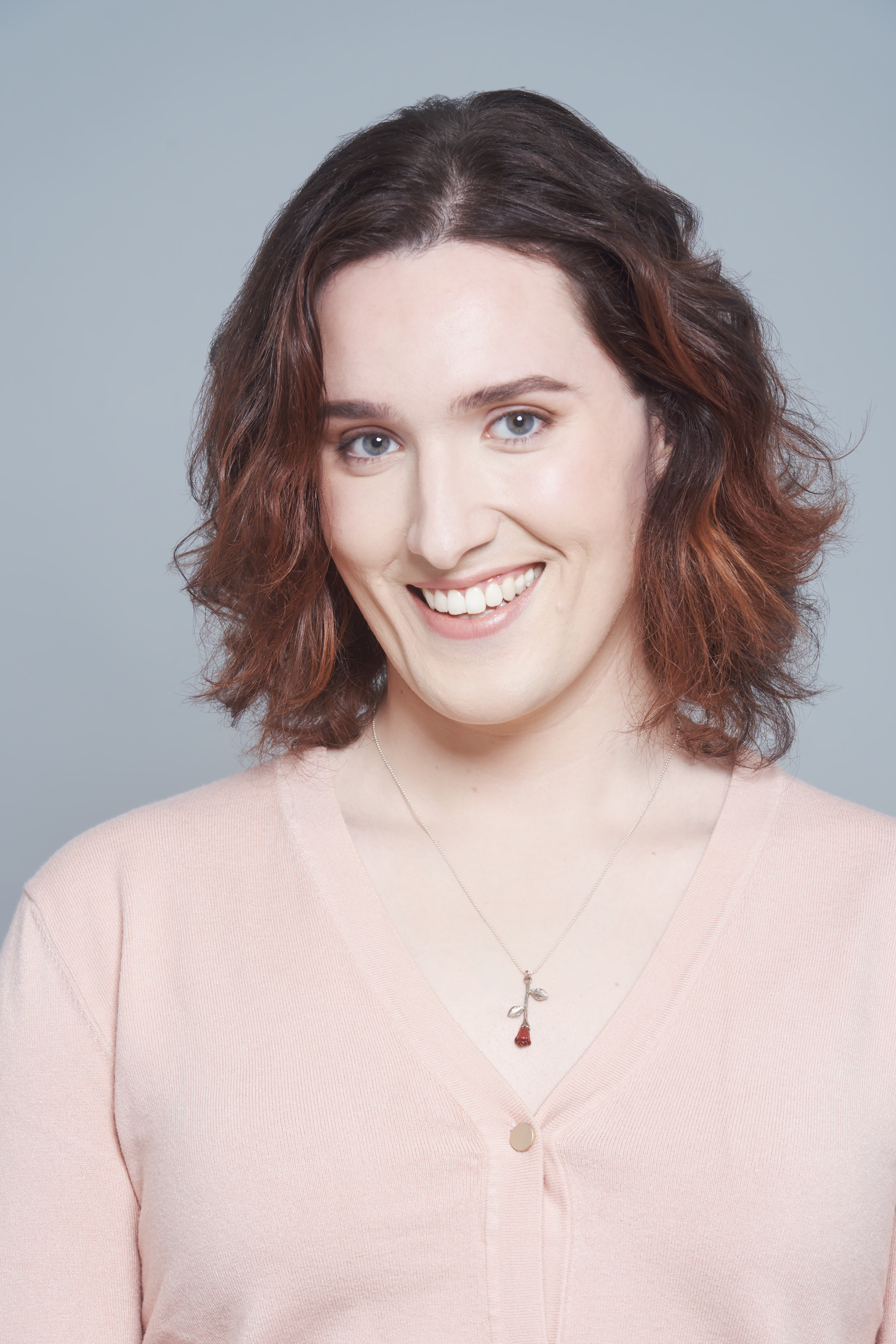
- Abigail Thorn
  Sharako Lohar (portrayed by Abigail Thorn) is an eccentric Lysene admiral and the commander of the Triarchy fleet. Residing in the free city of Tyrosh, she agrees to meet with Ser Tyland Lannister when he is sent to negotiate with the Triarchy for their help in breaking the Velaryon Fleet's blockade of King's Landing. After Tyland proves his worth and impresses Sharako by mud-wrestling her, she asks him to sire children through her wives and agrees to join him and bring her fleet to Westeros. In season 3, Sharako leads the Triarchy fleet and ignores the terms of her deal with Tyland to pursue Lord Corlys Velaryon during the Battle of the Gullet. She follows Corlys through a rocky pass, angering Tyland further, who she then throws overboard. She eventually rams Corlys' ship and duels him until the ship breaks apart. Alyn then engages Sharako and stabs her to death.

=== Dragons ===
- Syrax is an adult dragon with yellow scales hatched to and ridden by Rhaenyra Targaryen. She also laid a clutch of three dragon eggs on the Dragonmont on Dragonstone that were recovered by Prince Daemon. In season 3, Rhaenyra flies Syrax when she takes King's Landing.
- Caraxes, also known as the "Blood Wyrm", is an adult dragon with blood-red scales bonded to and ridden by Prince Daemon. Unlike most dragons, Caraxes's neck and body are much longer and more serpentine-shaped, and his roar is more high-pitched. Historically, he was previously bonded to Prince Aemon Targaryen, the father of Princess Rhaenys. He participates in the War for the Stepstones. In season 2, Daemon uses Caraxes to intimidate the Riverlords into supporting him and Rhaenyra, most notably Lord Amos Bracken. In season 3, Daemon flies Caraxes to help Rhaenyra take King's Landing. He later discovers Sheepstealer when Daemon travels to the Eyrie for gold and fights the wild dragon alongside Syrax and Seasmoke, causing Sheepstealer to flee.
- Meleys, also known as the "Red Queen", is an adult dragon with scarlet red scales bonded to and ridden by Princess Rhaenys Targaryen. She is known as one of the swiftest dragons in the known world. Historically, she was previously bonded to Princess Alyssa Targaryen, the mother of King Viserys I Targaryen and Prince Daemon Targaryen. When Rhaenys escapes from her house arrest in King's Landing, she uses Meleys to break through the floor of the Dragonpit and interrupt the coronation of King Aegon II Targaryen, before flying away to Dragonstone. In season 2, Meleys takes part in the Battle at Rook's Rest and manages to overpower Aegon and his dragon Sunfyre, wounding the dragon until the arrival of Prince Aemond and his dragon Vhagar, who sends Sunfyre tumbling to the ground. After grappling with Vhagar and forcing her to the ground, she is killed when Vhagar ambushes and crushes Meleys' neck, killing her and sending Rhaenys plummeting to her death as they crash onto Rook's Rest. After the battle, her head is decapitated and paraded around the streets of King's Landing, much to the horror of the smallfolk. In season 3, her headless corpse is still impaled on the battlements of Rook's Rest.
- Seasmoke is an adult dragon with silver-grey scales hatched to and ridden by Ser Laenor Velaryon until he fakes his death, and would later be claimed and ridden by the dragonseed Addam of Hull, Laenor's half-brother. He participates in the War for the Stepstones. After Laenor fakes his death and goes into exile, Seasmoke remained on Driftmark riderless and unclaimed. In season 2, Seasmoke had become restless and was called to Dragonstone by the dragonkeepers so that Ser Steffon Darklyn could attempt to claim him. Seasmoke refuses Steffon, however, and burns him alive, and later chases down Addam on the beaches of Driftmark. After Seasmoke lands and corners Addam, choosing him as his rider, Addam bonds with and claims the dragon. In season 3, Seasmoke takes part towards the end of the Battle of the Gullet, and is later used to locate Corlys Velaryon after he fell overboard during the battle. He is later used to patrol the Riverlands in search of Vhagar and fights Sheepstealer alongside Syrax and Caraxes when the wild dragon attacks them.
- Vhagar, also known as the "Queen of All Dragons", is an ancient dragon with deep jade green scales that hatched on Dragonstone following the Doom of Valyria and was bonded to and ridden by Lady Laena Velaryon until her death, and would then be claimed and ridden by Prince Aemond. She is the oldest, largest, and most powerful dragon in the known world. Historically, she was previously bonded to Queen Visenya Targaryen during Aegon's Conquest and later to Prince Baelon, the father of King Viserys I and Prince Daemon. Following the funeral of Lady Laena Velaryon, Aemond approaches the now unclaimed dragon and bonds with her, who accepts him as her rider. Following the death of Viserys, Vhagar disobeys Aemond's commands when he pursues Prince Lucerys on his dragon Arrax in the skies above Shipbreaker Bay in the Stormlands, resulting in her devouring both Arrax and his rider. In season 2, Vhagar takes part in the Battle at Rook's Rest as part of a plan to lure a dragon to defend the castle while it's under siege and have Vhagar ambush them. When Aemond and Vhagar enter the battle, she is commanded to attack both Princess Rhaenys's dragon Meleys and King Aegon II's dragon Sunfyre, engulfing the latter in flame and sending him tumbling to the ground. She later grapples with Meleys, and despite Meleys initially getting the upper hand, Vhagar crushes Meleys' neck and kills her, sending her body plummeting onto Rook's Rest below. Aemond later flies Vhagar to Sharp Point, the seat of House Bar Emmon, who are pledged to Queen Rhaenyra Targaryen, and burns it to the ground. In season 3, Aemond rides Vhagar to Harrenhal and has her kill the remaining soldiers garrisoned there. After Aemond is injured while taking Harrenhal, Vhagar flies off on her own while Aemond recovers, and is spotted burning farms near Wendish Town in the Riverlands.
- Balerion, also known as the "Black Dread", was a gigantic and powerful dragon with black scales from Old Valyria who was bonded to and ridden by King Aegon the Conqueror during the Conquest of Westeros. He was later bonded to King Maegor the Cruel and later Princess Aerea, the elder granddaughter of King Aenys I, the second King of the Seven Kingdoms, and Aegon's elder son. He would eventually be claimed and ridden by Viserys Targaryen until Balerion died of old age during the reign of King Jaehaerys the Conciliator. His skull would then be kept deep beneath the Red Keep in King's Landing, and Viserys would never ride again.
- Sunfyre, also known as "Sunfyre the Golden", is a young dragon with golden scales hatched to and ridden by King Aegon II. Unlike other dragons, he is shown to be able to take commands in the Common Tongue as well as High Valyrian. In season 2, Sunfyre takes part in the Battle at Rook's Rest when Aegon flies him into battle despite protests from his family and the Small Council. He attacks Princess Rhaenys Targaryen and her dragon Meleys but is quickly outmatched by the larger, more experienced dragon. After the arrival of Prince Aemond Targaryen and his dragon Vhagar, she engulfs Sunfyre in flame, which severely wounds him, causing Sunfyre and Aegon to tumble to the ground. As they fall, Sunfyre turns to shield Aegon from the impact with his body. Following the battle, Sunfyre remains at Rook's Rest injured, unable to fly, and kept under guard, although Aegon believes that he is likely dead. In season 3, Daemon mentions that Baela spotted Sunfyre's body while scouting the Riverlands and Crownlands for signs of other dragons. Aegon and Larys visit Sunfyre on their way to Rook's Rest, which some smallfolk were charging people to visit. Aegon claims he can hear Sunfyre breathing, even though the dragon had been motionless for several weeks. Sunfyre later awakens and reunites with Aegon, before Aegon commands him to burn the House Mooton army alive. He later flies with Aegon to Harrenhal to confront Aemond.
- Dreamfyre is an adult dragon with pale blue scales bonded to but rarely ridden by Queen Helaena Targaryen. Having hatched during the reign of King Aegon the Conqueror, she is one of the older dragons in the known world. Historically, she was previously bonded to Princess Rhaena Targaryen, the eldest daughter of King Aenys I Targaryen. One of Dreamfyre's eggs was chosen to be placed in the cradle of Prince Baelon Targaryen, but after Baelon's death, it was stolen by Prince Daemon Targaryen until he surrendered the egg to Princess Rhaenyra Targaryen.
- Tessarion, also known as the "Blue Queen", is a young dragon with dark cobalt scales hatched to and ridden by Prince Daeron Targaryen. In season 3, Tessarion is present alongside the Hightower army as it marches from the Reach towards the Crownlands. After Ormund Hightower seizes Tumbleton, Tessarion is kept hidden inside the town's keep to protect her from other dragons. After Daeron is forced by Ormund to execute Leo, Tessarion roasts and eats Leo's corpse.
- Moondancer is a young dragon with pale green scales hatched to and ridden by Lady Baela Targaryen. In season 2, while scouting near King's Landing on Moondancer, Baela spots Ser Criston Cole and his armies advancing through the Crownlands and chases him down before being forced to pull back. In season 3, Moondancer takes part in the Battle of the Gullet alongside Vermax. She is later sent to scout the Riverlands and Crownlands for signs of Vhagar and Sheepstealer.
- Vermax is a young dragon with olive green scales hatched to and ridden by Prince Jacaerys Velaryon. In season 3, Vermax takes part in the Battle of the Gullet alongside Moondancer. During the battle, Vermax is shot by a scorpion bolt fired by Triarchy ships and falls into the sea, where he drowns, with his dragonrider also killed by the Triarchy shortly afterwards.
- Arrax is a young dragon with pearlescent white scales hatched to and ridden by Prince Lucerys. Following the death of King Viserys I, both Arrax and Lucerys are devoured during an altercation with Prince Aemond and his dragon Vhagar in the skies above Shipbreaker Bay in the Stormlands, making him the first dragon to be killed during the Dance of the Dragons.
- Tyraxes is a dragon hatchling hatched to Prince Joffrey Velaryon. In season 2, he is sent to the Eyrie, alongside Joffrey, per the request of Lady Jeyne Arryn, who wants a dragon to protect the Vale. In season 3, Tyraxes presumably moves to King's Landing along with Joffrey.
- Stormcloud is a dragon hatchling with dark grey scales hatched to Prince Aegon the Younger. In season 2, he is sent to the Eyrie, alongside Aegon, per the request of Lady Jeyne Arryn, who wants a dragon to protect the Vale. He later leaves the Eyrie with Aegon when they are sent away to be ferried to Pentos on board the merchant ship the Gay Abandon to be under the protection of Prince Reggio Haratis.
- Vermithor, also known as the "Bronze Fury", is an adult dragon with bronze scales bonded to and ridden by the dragonseed Hugh Hammer. Historically, he was previously bonded to King Jaehaerys the Conciliator, Hugh's grandfather. Following Jaehaerys' death, Vermithor made his lair with Silverwing on the Dragonmont, a large volcano on Dragonstone, where he remained riderless and unclaimed. Having hatched during the reign of King Aegon the Conqueror, he is the second-largest dragon in the known world. In season 2, during the Red Sowing, Vermithor is called to Dragonstone by Queen Rhaenyra Targaryen. After the dragonseed Silver Denys attempts to claim Vermithor, the dragon burns him alive and begins massacring dozens of other dragonseeds until he is confronted by Hugh, who bonds with and claims the dragon. In season 3, Vermithor takes part towards the end of the Battle of the Gullet, and is later used to help Rhaenyra take King's Landing. Hugh later uses Vermithor to monitor Tumbleton and takes part in the Battle of Tumbleton.
- Silverwing is an adult dragon with silver scales bonded to and ridden by the dragonseed Ulf White. Historically, she was previously bonded to Queen Alysanne, wife of King Jaehaerys the Conciliator and Ulf's purported grandmother. Following Alysanne's death, Silverwing made her lair on the Dragonmont with Vermithor, where she remained riderless and unclaimed. Having hatched during the reign of King Aegon the Conqueror, she is one of the older dragons in the known world. In season 2, during the Red Sowing, Silverwing slumbers within the Dragonmount until Ulf stumbles into her lair. After approaching Ulf but remaining docile, she allows him to bond with and claim her. In season 3, Silverwing takes part towards the end of the Battle of the Gullet, and is later used to help Rhaenyra take King's Landing. Ulf later uses Silverwing to monitor Tumbleton on Rhaenyra's orders and attacks both the Tully army and Tumbleton itself when Ulf switches sides.
- Sheepstealer is an adult dragon with mud brown scales bonded to Rhaena Targaryen. In season 2, he lived wild in the Vale and hunted flocks of sheep for food. Wanting a dragon of her own, Rhaena goes searching for him. In season 3, she mounts Sheepstealer and quickly bonds with him. She then rides him to the Crownlands and takes part in the Battle of the Gullet, but she struggles to control him as Sheepstealer starts attacking both Velaryon and Triarchy ships, and even Baela on Moondancer, leading to the death of Jace and Vermax when they come to Baela's defence. Feeling guilty, Rhaena goes to Jeyne Arryn seeking asylum and offers to protect the Vale with Sheepstealer. They hide in the Vale until they are attacked by Caraxes, Syrax, and Seasmoke, leading to Sheepstealer becoming injured and riderless after Rhaena is taken to King's Landing.
