= Raven Dauda =

Canadian writer and actor

- Born: 1973 (age 52–53); Ottawa, Ontario, Canada
- Website: www.ravendauda.com

Raven Dauda is a Canadian writer and actress. She has appeared in numerous roles in film and television, and wrote and starred in a one-woman show, Addicted.

== Early life and education ==
Dauda was born in Ottawa in 1973 to a Jamaican mother and a father from Sierra Leone. She attended Studio 58, but did not complete the program.

== Career ==
Dauda gained recognition in the Toronto theatre scene for her performance as Esther in Intimate Apparel in 2008.

In 2018, Dauda's one-woman show, Addicted, premiered with Adedo Collective and Watah Theatre. She began creating the work while studying the Anitafrika method at the Watah theatre under d'bi young anitafrika. The play follows Penelope Day, an alcoholic with a family history of addiction, who checks herself into a rehab centre. The play was written to be the first part of a trilogy. In March 2024, Dauda brought Addicted to Halifax's Neptune Theatre.

== Awards and nominations ==
Year	Award	Category	Work	Result	Notes	Ref.
2009	Dora Mavor Moore Awards	Outstanding Performance in a Featured Role in a Play or Musical	Miss Julie: Freedom Summer	Won		
2009	Dora Mavor Moore Awards	Outstanding Performance in a Featured Role in a Play or Musical	Doubt, a parable	Nominated		
2018	Dora Mavor Moore Awards	Outstanding Performance Female	Addicted	Won	Produced by Adedo Collective and The Watah Theatre	
2023	ACTRA Awards	Outstanding Performance – Gender Non-Conforming or Female	Five Days at Memorial, “Day Five”	Won	For her portrayal of Angela McManus	

== Filmography ==
=== Television ===
Year	Title	Role	Notes
2018–2024	Star Trek: Discovery	Dr. Tracy Pollard	Recurring role (17 episodes)
2025	Mistletoe Murders	Debbie Brannigan	
2023	Spellbound	Ginger Jones	
2019–2025	Hudson & Rex	Jan Renley	
2022	Five Days at Memorial	Angela McManus	Mini-series
2022	The Hardy Boys	Deputy Con Riley	
2022	Transformers: BotBots	Agent Wagner and Agent Smartlit	Voice
2021	Titans	GCPD Administrator	
2021	The Hot Zone	Dr. Halstrom	
2020–2021	Nurses	Nurse Nadine	
2019–2021	Clifford the Big Red Dog	Mrs. Clayton	Voice
2020	Utopia Falls	Reia	
2020	The Umbrella Academy	Odessa	
2020	Grand Army	Nicole Jackson	
2020	Spinning Out	Nancy Stevens	
2018–2020	Murdoch Mysteries	Sarah Johnston	
2018	Condor	Hoyle	
2018	The Expanse	Nono Volovodov	
2017	Salvation	Harris's Secretary	
2017	Top Wing	Rhonda	Voice
2014–2017	Annedroids	Maggie Clegg	
2013	Nikita	Miriam Hasan	
2007–2009	da Kink in my Hair	Lara	
2007	Across the River to Motor City	Jessie Preacher	
2005	Riding the Bus with My Sister	Shane	TV movie
2004	Paradise Falls	Kelly Fairview	
2003	Bliss	Claire	
2000	Livin' for Love: The Natalie Cole Story	Janice	TV movie

=== Film ===
Year	Title	Role	Notes
2000	Left Behind: The Movie	Gloria	
2019	Life Support	Jogger	Short
2022	Stay the Night	Claire	

=== Theatre ===
Year	Title	Role	Notes
2005	da Kink in my Hair	Sharmaine	Mirvish Productions
2008	Intimate Apparel	Esther Mills	Obsidian Theatre
2008	Wild Dogs	Rachel	Nightwood Theatre
2009	Miss Julie: Freedom Summer	Christine	Canadian Stage Company and Vancouver Playhouse
2009	Doubt: A Parable	Mrs. Muller	Canadian Stage
2010	Intimate Apparel	Esther Mills	Canadian Stage and Obsidian Theatre
2012	The Penelopiad	Antinous / Maid	Nightwood Theatre
2013	4.48 Psychosis	Doctor	Necessary Angel Theatre Company
2016	Up The Garden Path	Amelia	Obsidian Theatre
2018	Addicted	All characters and playwright	Adedo Collective and The Watah Theatre
2020	The Events	Clair	Necessary Angel Theatre Company
2024	Addicted	All characters and playwright	Neptune Theatre

=== Web ===
Year	Title	Role	Notes
2021	CHILD-ish	Jani Lauzon	4-episode web series
