= Knuckledust (film) =

2020 British film by James Kermack

- Promotional poster
- Directed by: James Kermack
- Written by: James Kermack
- Produced by: Julien Loeffler; James Kermack; Fabrice Smadja; Daniel Goroshko; Genny Goudard; Rodolphe Sanze; Laurent Fumeron
- Starring: Moe Dunford; Kate Dickie; Gethin Anthony; Sébastien Foucan; Chris Patrick-Simpson; Guillaume Delaunay; Alex Ferns; Dave Bibby; James Kermack; Amy Bailey; Olivier Richters; Rohan Gurbaxani; Matthew Stathers; Christy O'Donnell; Phil Davis; Jaime Winstone; Camille Rowe
- Cinematography: Pat Aldinger
- Edited by: Chris Gill; Natasha Wilkinson
- Music by: Walter Mair
- Production companies: Featuristic Films; The Project; Head Gear Films; Metrol Technology; OneWorld Entertainment; Onsight; Trigger Films; IIW Studio; Attention O Chiens
- Distributed by: Samuel Goldwyn Films
- Release dates: December 8, 2020 (United States and Canada); December 11, 2020 (United Kingdom)
- Country: United Kingdom
- Language: English

Knuckledust is a 2020 British action-thriller film written and directed by James Kermack. Filmed in the United Kingdom, the film stars Moe Dunford, Kate Dickie, Camille Rowe, Phil Davis, Alex Ferns, Olivier Richters, Jaime Winstone, Gethin Anthony, and Sébastien Foucan. It was released in the United States and Canada on VOD by Samuel Goldwyn Films on December 8, 2020, and in the United Kingdom on December 11, where it was met with mixed reviews from critics.

== Premise ==
In Knuckledust, police discover an elite fight club where they find seven underground levels, filled with the dead bodies of fighters from around the world. Only one man is found left alive. The task force has to work out if he is a mass murderer or the lone survivor.

== Cast ==
- Moe Dunford as Hard Eight
- Kate Dickie as Keaton
- Camille Rowe as Serena
- Phil Davis as Happy
- Alex Ferns as Major Vaughn
- Olivier Richters as Rawbone
- Jaime Winstone as Redmond
- Gethin Anthony as Jeremiah
- Sébastien Foucan as Tick Tock

== Production ==
Principal photography for Knuckledust began on October 28, 2019. After filming in multiple countries in Europe, filming concluded on December 3, 2019, in the United Kingdom. On November 2, 2020, Samuel Goldwyn Films announced that they would distribute the film. In an interview, actress Kate Dickie revealed that she joined the film after reading its script.

== Reception ==
On review aggregator Rotten Tomatoes, Knuckledust holds an approval rating of 57% based on seven reviews, with an average rating of 5.6/10. From The Guardian, Leslie Felperin gave the film a star rating of two stars out of five, writing that the film's "cinematography seems designed to distract from the shabbiness of the sets, while the muffled dialogue and too-loud backing tracks make it nigh on impossible to work out what the hell is going on".
