= Rik Young =

British actor

- Born: Ricky James Young; 25 April 1978 (age 48); New Forest, England
- Education: Guildhall School of Music and Drama
- Occupations: Actor, dancer, Writer, producer
- Years active: 1995–present

Rik Young (born 25 April 1978) is an English actor, dancer, and producer. His early work includes the miniseries Children of Dune (2003) and the films Is Harry on the Boat? (2001) and Beowulf (2007). More recently, he is known for his roles in the series Find Me in Paris (2018–2020), Theodosia (2022–2024) and the Sky miniseries Gunpowder Siege (2024).

== Early life ==
Young grew up in Hythe, a suburb of Southampton. His mother Helen is a dance instructor and his older sister Rachel is a Utrecht-based comedian. He began working with professional ballet companies from the age of fifteen. He went on to train at the Guildhall School of Music and Drama, graduating in 2000.

== Filmography ==
=== Film ===
Year	Title	Role	Notes
1995	Shakespeare in the Park		Short film
1999	Hitlist	Paul	Short film
2000	Hit List	Paul	Short film
2007	License to Wed	Randy	Additional scenes
2007	Beowulf	Eofor	Voice role
2007	Perchance to Dream	Romeo	Short film
2009	Without a Paddle: Nature's Calling	Nigel	Direct-to-video
2010	Golf in the Kingdom	Evan Tyree	
2011	The Adventures of Tintin	Thompson	Voice role
2012	Bloodwork	Nigel Denton	
2013	Siren		
2015	Kick	Dan	Producer
TBA	The Midnight League		Upcoming

=== Television ===
Year	Title	Role	Notes
1997	Great Performances		Episode: Henry V at Shakespeare's Globe
2000	Diwrnod Hollol Mindblowing Heddiw	Jimmy	Television film (Welsh)
2001	Is Harry on the Boat?	Mario	Television film
2003	Frank Herbert's Children of Dune	Javid	Miniseries
2005	Hitched	Feifer	Television film
2006	Charmed	Nomed	Episode: "Kill Billie: Vol 2"
2006	Voodoo Moon	Daniel	Television film
2006	CSI: Crime Scene Investigation	Young Mickey Dunn	Episode: "Living Legend"
2007	The Suite Life of Zack & Cody	Johnny Vaine	Episode: "The Suite Life Goes Hollywood: Part 2"
2007	Bones	Thor / Calvin Johnson	Episode: "Death in the Saddle"
2018–2020	Find Me in Paris	Armando Castillo	59 episodes
2022–present	Theodosia	Alistair Throckmorton	52 episodes
2023–present	Spellbound	Armando Castillo	returning

== Stage ==
Year	Title	Role	Notes
1997	Henry V		Globe Theatre, London
1999	Far From the Madding Ballet		Birmingham Royal Ballet
2000	Romeo and Juliet		English National Ballet
2010	Romeo and Juliet	Mercutio	Creation Theatre Company, Oxford
2014	Much Ado About Nothing	Benedick	Globe Theatre, London
2016	Werther		Royal Opera House, London
2017	The Phantom of the Opera at the London Coliseum	—N/a	Producer; orchestral performance of Roy Budd's 1925 film score
2020	Mojo	Baby	The Drill, Lincoln
