= Find Me in Paris =

English-language television series

- Genre: Teen comedy-drama; Science fiction
- Created by: Jill Girling; Lori Mather
- Starring: Jessica Lord; Hannah Dodd; Rory J. Saper; Eubha Akilade; Hiran Abeysekera; Castle Rock; Christy O'Donnell; Terique Jarrett; Seán Óg Cairns; Chloe Fox; Caitlin-Rose Lacey; Jake Swift
- Composer: Norbert Gilbert
- Countries of origin: France; Germany
- Original language: English
- No. of seasons: 3
- No. of episodes: 78

Production
- Executive producers: Leila Smith; Jill Girling; Lori Mather
- Cinematography: Phillipe de Vaucelles; Jean-Phillipe Gosselin
- Camera setup: Multiple-camera setup
- Running time: 25 minutes
- Production companies: Cottonwood Media; ZDF Enterprises; BE-FILMS

Original release
- Network: Hulu
- Release: April 14, 2018 – August 21, 2020

Related
- Spellbound

Find Me in Paris is an English-language teen science-fantasy dramedy series that premiered on April 14, 2018, on Hulu and Netflix (only for season 1), produced by ZDF Enterprises and Cottonwood Media. The series is filmed on location in Paris, in areas such as the Palais Garnier and Opera National de Paris. The second season, consisting of 26 episodes, premiered on August 16, 2019. Later that year, the series was renewed for a third and final season, which premiered on August 21, 2020. Find Me in Paris is available in over 130 countries.

In 2022, a forthcoming successor series by the same creators and producers titled Spellbound was announced. The new series would be set in the same location of the Paris Opera Ballet School, but with a new cast of characters and a focus on magic rather than time travel.

== Plot ==
=== Season 1 ===
Lena Grisky, a Russian princess from 1905, is training to be a ballerina at the Opéra de Paris and is the school's top student. Her boyfriend Henri is unaware that his family are time travellers, and he discovers a time-piece hidden by his father, which he gives to Lena as a gift, thinking it is just a piece of jewellery. Lena is transported and trapped in the year of 2018, leaving Henri battling to find a way to bring her back and to fight off the Time Collectors, who set out to capture Lena.

Meanwhile in 2018, Lena must continue to attend ballet school at the modern Opéra de Paris in order to keep her identity a secret and remain in Paris until she can return to 1905. However, despite wanting to return to 1905, Lena soon settles into her new time period and makes new friends with some of the school's other students - Jeff, Dash and Ines, who becomes her best friend and the first to discover her secret. However, she also finds a rival in the ruthless Thea, who sees Lena as a threat to her ambition to be the school's best dancer. To make things even more complicated, even though Lena has not forgotten Henri, she ends up falling for Max, who becomes her dance partner. She also finds a love for a new dance genre, hip-hop, when she joins Max's dance group called the BLOK. With all these conflictions, Lena is left with a dilemma: return to 1905 or stay in the future.

=== Season 2 ===
Thea has time travelled to 1905, and it is reported to the time travel bureau that someone has entered the wrong century. It is then revealed in episode 15 that Lena was actually born in the 21st-century, but was sent to the late 19th-century as a new-born. Lena and Henri become separated in different time zones, and write letters to each other throughout the season. Thea discovers the Time Collectors, and begins a relationship with Frank, and uses his time travelling device.

Frank and Thea devise a plan to control Time Travel but things go awry when a rookie Bureau agent, Lex, decides to fix things without qualifications. She soon begins to interfere with Lena's life and causes problems. Whilst at the school, Lena joins Max in a risky dance that injures his knee. Max is ruled out for dancing leaving Lena and Jeff to fight for ownership of the BLOK. They decide to create one group and join the American competition series called Dance Off which Thea won a couple of years ago. Later on, Lena is ready to return to her time period but then Travels to 1983 with, Jeff, Inez and Isaac by mistake. Lex struggles to comprehend what has happened but then gets deleted by Captain Nico Michaels, a high ranking teen in the Bureau. She is deleted for unauthorised interference with Time Travel. Frank and Thea get thrown into 1905 and combining the powers of the time pieces Clive and Pinky are lost.

=== Season 3 ===
The season starts with Lena and the gang's memories erased. For First Division, they have been chosen to join Mr Castillo's experimental workshop in the South of France for the first half of the year. In this season, 2 important main characters leave the show: Thea remains in 1905 and goes on a world tour, meanwhile Max leaves Paris because of his injury and goes to London. Nico goes undercover as a student, taking Max's place as Lena's dance partner. A younger dancer named Romy shows up to the workshop, wanting to take part. Later, she finds photos of Lena from 1905 in her house and wants to investigate despite her skeptical friend Simon's dissuasion.

Lena has dreams and flashbacks of time travel and her 1905 life she cannot make sense of. Whenever she or Ines remember, they forget again. They attempt to piece things together with notes, but Nico sabotages them. Frank sends Claudine to the future to figure out Nico's intentions with Lena. Henri arrives in the South and realises Lena's lost her memories. After a few tries, she manages to get them back after a kiss. Romy, who is now in on it, introduces Lena to her father, who reveals himself to be Lena's father.

Mr Castillo's group returns to Paris, but loses to Ms Carré's group. Lena suggests they put on their version of The Nutcracker anyway. However, she, Henri, and Frank are transported to a time traveller's ball in 1905. Nico also ends up there, meaning all of them must be Heirs. It is revealed his mother Quinn runs the Bureau, and that all this information was kept from him since he was raised to be an agent. They manage to get back in time to finish the show by making a deal with Quinn that the Chosen One will turn themself in when they turn 18. Romy has Lena's timepiece and keeps using it to manipulate things in her favour.

== Cast ==
=== Main ===
- Jessica Lord as Helena "Lena" Grisky
- Hannah Dodd as Dorothea "Thea" Raphael (main, seasons 1–2; guest, season 3)
- Rory J. Saper as Maximus "Max" Alvarez Castillo (seasons 1–2)
- Eubha Akilade as Ines Le Breton
- Hiran Abeysekera as Dash Khan (main, season 1; guest, season 2)
- Castle Rock as Jeffrey "Jeff" Chase
- Christy O'Donnell as Henri Duquet
- Terique Jarrett as Isaac Portier (seasons 2–3)
- Chloe Fox as Bree Girling (recurring, seasons 1–2, main, season 3)
- Caitlin-Rose Lacey as Kennedy Mather (recurring, seasons 1–2, main, season 3)
- Seán Óg Cairns as Frank (recurring, seasons 1–2, main, season 3)
- Audrey Hall as Claudine Renault (recurring, seasons 1–2, main, season 3)
- Jake Swift as Nico Michaels (main, season 3)
- Isabelle Allen as Romy Jensen (recurring, season 3)

=== Recurring ===
- Lawrence Walker as Pinky
- Luca Varsalona as Clive
- Katherine Erhardy as Gabrielle Carré
- Sophie Airdien as Francie Parks (season 1)
- Elisa Doughty as Princess Alexandra
- Ingo Brosch as Victor Duquet
- Chris Baltus as Etienne (season 1)
- Javone Prince as Oscar
  - Edward Kagutuzi as Young Oscar
- Rik Young as Armando Castillo
- Manuel Pacific as Reuben Bello
- Rameet Rauli as Alexa "Lex" Dosne (recurring, season 2; guest, season 3)
- Esther Lindebergh as Jenna Bicks (seasons 2–3)
- Louis Davison as Simon (season 3)
- Josh Burdett as Jack Jensen (season 3)
- Kirsty Mitchell as Quinn Michaels (season 3)

== Episodes ==
Season	Episodes	Originally released	
Season	Episodes	First released	Last released
1	26	April 14, 2018	July 20, 2018
2	26	August 16, 2019	
3	26	August 21, 2020	

=== Season 1 (2018) ===
No. overall	No. in season	Title	Directed by	Written by	Original release date
1	1	"The Portal of the Opera"	Matt Bloom	Jill Girling & Lori Mather-Welch	April 14, 2018
When Lena, a princess in 1905, discovers that her parents are planning to move her from her school at the Garnier to her home back in Russia, she and her boyfriend, Henri, hatch a plan to run away together. But just when she's about to make her escape she finds herself thrown through time, landing in modern day Paris. With no time to adjust, she must use her ballet training at the Paris Opera Ballet School in order to keep her cover, posing as a student who hasn't arrived yet, Elena Grande.
2	2	"Rooftop Hip-Hop"	Matt Bloom	Jill Girling & Lori Mather-Welch	April 14, 2018
After learning that she's time travelled, Lena is visibly rattled, but it is vital that she stay put and remain at the Garnier for the time being. Help is on the way with Henri’s father on the hunt to retrieve her. Unfortunately, he's not the only one searching. Three dangerous thugs, The Time Collectors, are on her tail looking to steal the timepiece given to her by Henri. Lena will have to use her ballet talents to blend in if she hopes to remain at the Garnier long enough to be rescued.
3	3	"Together Again"	Matt Bloom	Jill Girling & Lori Mather-Welch	April 14, 2018
After the real Elena Grande arrives, obvious questions arise. Luckily for her, Victor arrives just in time. He is quick with answers to every question and adds that Lena comes from royalty with a benefactor who will pay Lena’s tuition if she's allowed to stay. Impressed by Lena's talent, Ms. Carré agrees to keep her on. Victor leaves Lena behind in an effort to trap the advancing Time Collectors, but Henri has his own plan for saving Lena – one with unforeseen consequences.
4	4	"Just Dance"	Matt Bloom	Jill Girling & Lori Mather-Welch	April 21, 2018
Henri’s quick thinking with the timepiece might’ve saved Lena from the Time Collectors but unfortunately they aren't the only ones kept from getting to her. With Victor and Henri trapped in different years, Lena must settle into her new life at the Paris Opera Ballet School and her new confidante Ines is there to help. She'll need all the help she can get - between the heavy workload, modern ballet techniques, and the trouble with her new dance partner - Lena is truly a fish out of water.
5	5	"Pineapple Therapy"	Matt Bloom	Jill Girling & Lori Mather-Welch	April 21, 2018
Desperate to fit into her new surroundings, Lena begs fellow student, Jeff, into taking her on a little day trip outside the school walls. It is exciting and new, and Lena gets easily distracted by this new world, filled with colorful clothing and funky music. Meanwhile, the other students participate in an artistic exercise and Ines is hurt by Dash’s interpretation of her.
6	6	"Battle of the Tutus"	Matt Bloom	Jill Girling & Lori Mather-Welch	April 28, 2018
Lena’s super excited for the opportunity to be a "Little Mother," a mentor to one of the younger students. When she realizes that she'll have to go head-to-head with Thea to compete for the spot, it is game on. The two face-off in endurance challenges unaware that it is all an entertaining mind-game for the conniving protégé. Elsewhere Max auditions for an exclusive underground dance crew.
7	7	"Curse of the Fairy"	Matt Bloom	Jill Girling & Lori Mather-Welch	April 28, 2018
When Etienne assigns a scene study about a love triangle, everyone is excited until parts are handed out. Initially being given the part of the Fairy, Lena loses the role after multiple failed attempts at the dance with Max. She stays determined to get the role back, which she eventually does after practising with Ines. Henri and Oscar construct a model of a time machine, which the Time Collectors copy with the intention of building their own.
8	8	"Twirls, Spins, and Dobles"	Matt Bloom	Jill Girling & Lori Mather-Welch	May 5, 2018
The feels are alive at the Paris Opera Ballet School. Max is still conflicted about his feelings for Lena following the scene study and is standoffish towards her. When Lena sees Max acting suspiciously she follows Max to his aunt’s modest home. There, she is ambushed by his loud and nosey family as they take an instant liking to Lena and pry into her and Max’s non-relationship status.
9	9	"Faux Besties"	Matt Bloom	Jill Girling & Lori Mather-Welch	May 5, 2018
When Ms. Carré assigns Lena, Ines, and Thea together for a trio ballet assignment, everyone expects the worst. However, both Lena and Thea surprisingly find common ground over a Ballet they both enjoy, and choose it to perform for their assignment. They bond leaving a confused Ines feeling like a third wheel. Lena manages to reunite her friendship with Ines. Max struggles to come up with a dance to present to Group XS, and is about to tell them that they will perform later, but Jeff and the others come to his aid, and together they present a dance that is praised by Group XS.
10	10	"A Pain in the Bun"	Matt Bloom	Jill Girling & Lori Mather-Welch	May 12, 2018
It is audition time for the mid-season show. Knowing she might not get this opportunity again, Lena plans to work hard and nail it. That is until she gets paired with Jeff, a talented but undisciplined dancer. With it all on the line, Lena tries everything from inspiring speeches to reverse psychology, but nothing works. Jeff will not take the upcoming auditions seriously. Lena is out of ideas, that is until she gets helpful advice from an unlikely source.
11	11	"What Happens Under the Garnier"	Matt Bloom	Jill Girling & Lori Mather-Welch	May 19, 2018
With the completion of the port-a-portal, the Time Collectors double cross Henri and make their way to modern day to grab both Lena and the timepiece. Luckily a tied up Henri escapes and follows after them through the portal. Meanwhile, Lena accidentally traps herself and her classmates in the tunnels below the Garnier. As the students split off into groups, Lena and Max pair up and search for an escape, unaware that a frantic Henri has arrived in present day and is looking for her.
12	12	"The Chill Method"	Matt Bloom	Jill Girling & Lori Mather-Welch	May 19, 2018
As the mid-season performance nears, Lena is pushing herself to her limit. She wants to be perfect but the pressure is getting to her. After several shaky rehearsals, Ms. Carré demotes pairs Lena and Max to the understudy roles. A motivated Max concocts a plan to get their leading roles back. He enlists his go-to “chill method” to try to get Lena to relax. Ms. Carré witnesses them practise outdoors, and gives them their roles back, leaving a frustrated Thea. She sneaks out on the rooftop, discovering one of Henri’s most recent letters to Lena.
13	13	"Gone"	Matt Bloom	Jill Girling & Lori Mather-Welch	July 20, 2018
It is the mid-season performance day and the air is electric as Lena gets ready backstage. After the intense audition process, all the rehearsals, and almost losing the role to her understudy Thea, Lena is ready to wow the audience and most importantly Ms. Carré. But just before the performance, Lena is handed a letter from Henry by Thea. She decides to go and meet Henry, but takes the opportunity to kiss Max on stage before heading out. Henri manages to free himself from the Time Collectors’s restrains before heading to present day to Lena, but he is abducted just as they make contact.
14	14	"Time to Face the Music"	R.T. Thorne	Jill Girling & Lori Mather-Welch	July 20, 2018
Still confused about where Henri went, Lena returns to the school to face the aftermath of the previous night. Carré decides to expel her, leaving Lena with no place to go. Ines rallies Jeff, Max and Dash to convince Carré to let Lena stay, which later proves to pay off, and Lena adds to it with her own persuasion. Henri is revealed to have been taken back to 1905 by Victor, who scolds him for causing a dent in time. In the process, he destroys the time machine, trapping the Time Collectors in 2018. They manage to repair the time machine and travel back to 1905, however, Pinky stays behind.
15	15	"Between the Bricks"	R.T. Thorne	Jill Girling & Lori Mather-Welch	July 20, 2018
Carré has the students start on a new project with mixed decade as a theme, but benches Lena as punishment. Lena resorts to practising on her own. In 1905, Victor advises Henri to not attempt to travel back in time, and united with Lena, they decide to exchange letters. The Time Collectors arrive back in 1905, ordering Victor to hand over the second time measure, which he refuses. Frank then puts him on an eternal time loop eating an apple, before he and Clive discover a secret door. In there, they rummage through letters in order to find information about the second time measure, which they eventually do, giving them a new clue about someone named Alex having the second piece. Lena puts forward customes for the groups, excluding Max and Thea, to use for the project, which impresses Carré. However, she gives Lena a stern warning not to cross her again, while also revealing she was testing her by having her benched. On the rooftop, Lena and Henri share a dance between their respective times.
16	16	"High-Stakes Hip-Hop"	R.T. Thorne	Jill Girling & Lori Mather-Welch	July 20, 2018
Lena starts frequently corresponding with Henri, updating him on most things she has experienced. However, upon mentioning Max, Henri becomes wary. She asks Ines to help her in a discussion about the time bubble and how Henri plans to get her back. He runs out of papers, and returns only to find the gates locked. Max approaches Lena with a new idea to use the Baroque themed dance from their previous assignment and blend it with some hip-hop for a BLOK dance - a flash mob. However, Lena is unable to find her mask, causing an absent for the dance. Upon the others returning to the school, Lena discovers that Thea stole her mask, sabotaging her. As a result of her actions, Max decides to break up with Thea. She and Lena start an argument, the latter accusing her of sabotage, while Thea accuses her of being jealous. Returning to her correspondence with Henri, Lena thinks that he might be angry, but he tells her was getting more paper, but ends up with her breaking up with him. She practises the Baroque-hip hop themed dance in the tunnels under the Garnier, being observed by an impressed Max.
17	17	"A Slippery Pointe"	R.T. Thorne	Jill Girling & Lori Mather-Welch	July 20, 2018
Lena is still heartbroken after her breakup with Henri. Thea pranks her with luring out of her room and locking the door, and putting gooey substance on the handle bars in a practise room. Lena decides to get back at her with masquerading as a celebrity blogger, Lav D. The prank has a more severe impact on Thea then Lena expected, and does her best to comfort her. She finds the right thing being to emphasise their rivalry. Dash is excluded from a special group project, which Max and Jeff are picked to join. He auditions for a ballet school in London, but breaks his ankle in the process. Ines encourages him to do better. She also advises Lena not to talk about her situation due to Thea now being their roommate, unbeknown that Thea is eavesdropping.
18	18	"Oh Brother"	R.T. Thorne	Jill Girling & Lori Mather-Welch	July 20, 2018
When the BLOK gets a hand delivered an invitation to participate in an underground dance competition, everyone is psyched but concerned as most of their challenges come by text. They are supposed to be a secret club, so many wonder who else knows about them. Even with all this, the temptation is too great and the BLOK gladly accept. However, they discover that another group, El Barrio, has stolen their baroque themed dance, forcing them to make a new one, combining hip-hop and ballet. In 1905, Henri is unable to find his father, but manages to steal back the pendant from the Time Collectors. He and Lena later meet at the same bridge he was abducted from, feeling their respective heart beats between their respective times.
19	19	"Running in the Family"	R.T. Thorne	Jill Girling & Lori Mather-Welch	July 20, 2018
The students are abuzz as auditions for the end of season performance approach. When a famous choreographer, Armando Castillo, arrives, everyone is on their best behavior except Max, who seems intent to undermine him.
20	20	"Secrets and Pointes"	R.T. Thorne	Jill Girling & Lori Mather-Welch	July 20, 2018
After Max’s family secret is revealed, Lena pushes him to confront his famous father and finally make peace. But when Reuben, the leader of El Barrio, enters the rehearsal studio and is introduced as Armando’s son - Max’s brother, anger and jealousy lead to more resentment. Frustrated by Max’s attitude, Lena takes Max to an underprivileged community center with the intent to have Max teach a dance lesson.
21	21	"L.O.V.E."	R.T. Thorne	Jill Girling & Lori Mather-Welch	July 20, 2018
Word is out that Lena and Max kissed so Lena takes it upon herself to talk it out with Thea. She is pleasantly surprised when Thea seems happy for the pair. Unbeknownst to Lena, Thea poses as her and sends Henri a letter telling him about Max.
22	22	"They Know"	R.T. Thorne	Jill Girling & Lori Mather-Welch	July 20, 2018
On a class trip to the museum, Lena gets the shock of her life, when she comes face to face with the Grisky family portrait. In it, her mother is wearing a necklace, one she's never seen before.
23	23	"Spinning Lies"	R.T. Thorne	Jill Girling & Lori Mather-Welch	July 20, 2018
The pressure is on as the end of year gala is quickly approaching. Armando and Ms. Carré are watching and judging, preparing to decide who gets a solo, who gets a pairs role, and who is exiled to the corp. Lena tries her best to focus, but she's distracted after learning that her mother is also a time traveller.
24	24	"Dance 'till You Drop"	R.T. Thorne	Jill Girling & Lori Mather-Welch	July 20, 2018
Lena’s still grappling with everything she found out about her mother. Dance is the only thing that can keep her mind off it so she throws herself in completely. During the warm up, Max learns that the BLOK has qualified for the Euro Challenge, a big underground dance competition with crew from all over Europe. But this time the dance members balk. How can they do the BLOK challenge and rehearse for the year-end gala?
25	25	"A Dangerous Game"	R.T. Thorne	Jill Girling & Lori Mather-Welch	July 20, 2018
Lena and the BLOK are swamped as they not only rehearse for tomorrow’s gala but also prepare to sneak off after school to their first Euro Challenge. Plans go awry, when a frustrated Armando changes the choreography yet again and announces a late night rehearsal.
26	26	"Showtime"	R.T. Thorne	Jill Girling & Lori Mather-Welch	July 20, 2018
It is performance day. It is portal day. Lena’s a nervous wreck. She's worried about the fallout from the BLOK, she's nervous about seeing Henri, she's feeling a hundred emotions at once. Fortunately, Lena and Ines make peace and Ines promises to help Lena avoid the Time Collectors while they wait for Henri. But when Henri finally arrives and is eager to bring Lena home, she feels conflicted about where home really is. The portal was closed the time they got there and Lena and Henri are now stuck in 2018. Thea had taken the special time piece that Lena dropped from the powerful spark and time traveled to 1905.

=== Season 2 (2019) ===
No. overall	No. in season	Title	Directed by	Written by	Original release date
27	1	"Moments Later"	Unknown	Unknown	August 16, 2019
Resuming after the season one cliffhanger, Lena is stuck in the present with Henri, while her modern day nemesis Thea has been thrown back in time to 1905.
28	2	"New Year, New Rules"	Unknown	Unknown	August 16, 2019
It is the first day of Second Division, and the group are surprised that Armando's back to teach permanently.
29	3	"Out of Place"	Unknown	Unknown	August 16, 2019
As Henri fumbles through 2019, it creates distance between him and Lena, so he plans a romantic picnic of the roof, hoping to rekindle their chemistry.
30	4	"Whatever It Takes"	Unknown	Unknown	August 16, 2019
With the announcement of the European Choreographer's Grand Prix, lines are drawn in the sand, when Lena and Ines both vie for the same role.
31	5	"Game On"	Unknown	Unknown	August 16, 2019
Lena's on a mission to one up Thea by starting her own all-girl hip-hop crew and entering them in Thea's claim to fame, the TV series "Dance Off".
32	6	"Unexpected Allies"	Unknown	Unknown	August 16, 2019
During auditions for the European Choreographer's Grand Prix, Lena is devastated to learn that not only are Ines and Pinky working together behind her back, but also Henri is missing.
33	7	"Close Call"	Unknown	Unknown	August 16, 2019
Lena must put her anger and feelings of betrayal aside and team up with Ines and Pinky to save Henri from time jail.
34	8	"Break a Leg"	Unknown	Unknown	August 16, 2019
When Lena joins Max in a risky dance routine to dazzle Armando, the routine goes wrong and Max seriously injures his knee.
35	9	"Guess Who's Back"	Unknown	Unknown	August 16, 2019
It is Portal Day and Lex is on a mission to return everyone to their rightful time periods.
36	10	"New Kids On the BLOK"	Unknown	Unknown	August 16, 2019
When Lena learns the BLOKettes yielded a spot on Dance Off, she and Jeff butt heads over leadership.
37	11	"The Takeover"	Unknown	Unknown	August 16, 2019
Lena and Jeff battle it out at a dance challenge to decide who will be the new leader of the BLOK.
38	12	"Ballet Off"	Unknown	Unknown	August 16, 2019
The students travel to Brussels for the European Choreographer's Grand Prix but when Lena leads them to a ballet battle with another school, they all could be expelled.
39	13	"Can't Beat the Elite"	Unknown	Unknown	August 16, 2019
During the performance for the European Choreographer's Grand Prix, Lex arrives and although Lena tries her best to stop her, Lex is determined to win this round!
40	14	"On the Run"	Unknown	Unknown	August 16, 2019
With Victor's help, Lena and Thea break out of the Bureau and escape through a portal door right back into the Garnier.
41	15	"Like Father, Like Son"	Unknown	Unknown	August 16, 2019
As the girls search for the missing timepiece, Armando assigns the students a dance project that quickly turns into a competition between father and son.
42	16	"Spread the Love"	Unknown	Unknown	August 16, 2019
When Lena agrees to play Valentine's Day cupid, she misinterprets her mission and creates confusion and hurt feelings.
43	17	"Who's the Boss?"	Unknown	Unknown	August 16, 2019
Lena's and Jeff's dance crews perform in front of the producers of "Dance Off," but Thea plays both sides and claims the crews as her own.
44	18	"The Brainy Bunch"	Unknown	Unknown	August 16, 2019
Lena and Max are partnered for a science fair project, but Lena is left wondering if they are compatible as a couple.
45	19	"Sabotage"	Unknown	Unknown	August 16, 2019
All the students vie to choreograph the year-end carte blanche showcase. Armando gets them to compete with each other, as he decides which choreography will feature at the showcase.
46	20	"Mystery Princess"	Unknown	Unknown	August 16, 2019
After Thea drops out of the BLOK, Lena must create online buzz for the crew in order to stay on "Dance Off."
47	21	"Flash Forward"	Unknown	Unknown	August 16, 2019
During Max's auditions for the carte blanche showcase, Lena is distracted by trying to get Ines to forgive her for changing the calculations on her time-travel science paper.
48	22	"Mutiny at the Garnier"	Unknown	Unknown	August 16, 2019
After Lena learns that only Thea and Isaac have roles in Max's showcase, she complains to Gabrielle who splits the performance into two parts between Max and Lena.
49	23	"Lost and Found"	Unknown	Unknown	August 16, 2019
Lena is livid when she discovers Henri is in the present day and didn't reach out, and later learns even worse news about Ines.
50	24	"One Last Chance"	Unknown	Unknown	August 16, 2019
Lena devises a plan to reset all time and decides to take the BLOK onto "Dance Off."
51	25	"He Knows"	Unknown	Unknown	August 16, 2019
After being expelled for going on "Dance Off," Lena tells Max everything about her life, and the two redesign the showcase for a final performance together.
52	26	"Going Home"	Unknown	Unknown	August 16, 2019
Lena is ready to reset time after one final showcase with her friends.

=== Season 3 (2020) ===
No. overall	No. in season	Title	Directed by	Written by	Original release date
53	1	"This is 1983"	Unknown	Unknown	August 21, 2020
Lena and the crew are stuck in 1983, with Henri having been deleted by the Time Bureau.
54	2	"The Future of Dance"	Unknown	Unknown	August 21, 2020
Back in present day with their time travel memories erased, Lena and the crew finish their school exams for the year, unsure of their future or their past.
55	3	"Pair Up"	Unknown	Unknown	August 21, 2020
With Max gone, Lena panics about not having a dance partner but her problem seems solved when she meets Nico.
56	4	"Trouble in Paradise"	Unknown	Unknown	August 21, 2020
In the South of France, the crew has an opportunity to audition for the CJ Company's production, but dance partner drama gets in the way.
57	5	"The New Girl"	Unknown	Unknown	August 21, 2020
Lena is challenged by a younger dancer named Romy, who is hoping to train with the First Division.
58	6	"Trip Down Memory Lane"	Unknown	Unknown	August 21, 2020
With her time travel memories erased, Lena struggles to complete an assignment about her dance progress.
59	7	"Slamming Doors"	Unknown	Unknown	August 21, 2020
Armando issues a ballet challenge to the CJ Company and other divisions on behalf of the crew, but tensions among crew members hinder the creative process.
60	8	"Magic Kiss"	Unknown	Unknown	August 21, 2020
Henri is back in present day and working hard to help Lena regain her memories.
61	9	"Old Friends"	Unknown	Unknown	August 21, 2020
Nico suspects that Lena has regained her memories which forces Claudine and Lena to work together to save the day.
62	10	"Down to the Wire"	Unknown	Unknown	August 21, 2020
Lena and Claudine hatch a plan to steal Nico's wristband in order to disarm him and give Ines her memories back.
63	11	"Family Reunion"	Unknown	Unknown	August 21, 2020
Lena struggles with meeting her biological father and tries to focus on ballet and the upcoming performance.
64	12	"The Nutcracker"	Unknown	Unknown	August 21, 2020
Lena has the idea to put on a "Night of Tchaikovsky" performance at the school but everything is derailed by a mysterious ball in 1905.
65	13	"Four Heirs"	Unknown	Unknown	August 21, 2020
The "Night of Tchaikovsky" performance is about to begin, but Ines, Jeff and Isaac are trapped in 1905.
66	14	"The Deal"	Unknown	Unknown	August 21, 2020
Lena, Henri, Frank, and Nico are held captive in the white room until they reach an agreement with the Bureau.
67	15	"You're All Out"	Unknown	Unknown	August 21, 2020
With Company auditions fast approaching, Armando gives the first division assessments and mock auditions.
68	16	"Operation Armando"	Unknown	Unknown	August 21, 2020
After everyone is ranked by Armando, they see him with a mysterious woman and believe he is leaving the school.
69	17	"What If"	Unknown	Unknown	August 21, 2020
Armando gives out aptitude tests and the crew members are unhappy with their results.
70	18	"Who's Got Talent"	Unknown	Unknown	August 21, 2020
The Heirs put on a Talent Show as a cover for a covert mission.
71	19	"Only the Best"	Unknown	Unknown	August 21, 2020
The pressure is on as the crew learns there are only three spots left in the Company.
72	20	"Rescue Mission"	Unknown	Unknown	August 21, 2020
Lena and Nico must sneak into the Bureau to save Romy.
73	21	"Video Undercover"	Unknown	Unknown	August 21, 2020
Lena and Ines feel the pressure with Company auditions fast approaching.
74	22	"Time to Train"	Unknown	Unknown	August 21, 2020
Nico trains Lena, Henri and Frank for their upcoming time fight with the Bureau.
75	23	"No Dance Today"	Unknown	Unknown	August 21, 2020
With Company auditions one day away, Armando instructs the crew that they must rest and not rehearse or even think about dance.
76	24	"This Is It"	Unknown	Unknown	August 21, 2020
Today's the day the crew has been working towards their entire life -- The Paris Opera Ballet Company auditions.
77	25	"The Chosen One"	Unknown	Unknown	August 21, 2020
It is the Heirs' 18th birthday which means the Chosen One will be revealed and the Bureau will come to take him or her away.
78	26	"Make It or Break It"	Unknown	Unknown	August 21, 2020
Fast forwarding in time to see what the crew is up to six months after the fight against the Bureau.

== Production ==
Find Me in Paris is a French-German series produced by Cottonwood Media in association with ZDF, ZDF Enterprises, and the Opera National de Paris. The production budget for season one was $12.5 million.

Filming for the third season commenced in July 2019, and wrapped on November 28, 2019.

== Broadcast ==
Region	Network	Ref.
Australia	ABC	
Canada	Gem	
Bosnia and Herzegovina; Bulgaria; Croatia; Czech Republic; Hungary; North Macedonia; Poland; Romania; Serbia; Slovakia	HBO Europe	
Finland	Yleisradio	
Slovenia	Pop TV, HBO Europe and OTO	
France	Disney Channel and France Télévisions	
Germany	ZDF	
Italy	Disney Channel, Rai Gulp and DeA Kids	
Japan	NHK Etele	
Portugal	SIC K and RTP 2	
Sweden	SVT Barn	
United Kingdom	Nickelodeon	
United States	Hulu and Universal Kids	
Latin America	Disney Channel	
Belgium	Ketnet	
The Netherlands	Zapp	
Catalonia	SX3	

== See also ==
- Time travel in fiction
