= Spellbound (2023 TV series) =

- Created by: Jill Girling; Lori Mather
- Countries of origin: France; Germany
- Original language: English
- No. of seasons: 2
- No. of episodes: 39

Production
- Producers: David Michel; Cécile Lauritano; Zoé Carrera Allaix
- Production companies: Cottonwood Media; ZDF Studios

Original release
- Network: France 4 (France); ZDF (Germany); Hulu (United States)
- Release: August 31, 2023 – October 11, 2024

Related
- Find Me in Paris

Spellbound is an English-language tween fantasy television series. Produced by ZDF Studios and Cottonwood Media, it serves as a successor series to Find Me in Paris (2018–2020), set in the same location of the Paris Opera Ballet School, but with a new cast of characters and a focus on magic rather than time travel. The series premiered on Hulu on 31 August 2023.

== Cast ==
=== Main ===
- Hailey Romain as Cece Parker Jones
- Margherita Barbieri as Simone Souter
- Abigail O'Regan as Mia Banks
- Etienne Moana as Benoit Ducasse
- Sam Darius as Jack Ryder
- Zac Gabriel Werb as Finn Cassidy
- Lance West as Sebastian "Bash" Baker
- Georgia Pemberton as Jade Hudson

=== Recurring ===
- Rik Young as Armando Castillo
- Cameron James-King as Adrian Stone
- Imogen Mackie Walker as Amy
- Raven Dauda as Ginger Jones, Cece's aunt
- Malou Beauvoir as Lizzie Jones
- Gomolémo Tsagaé as Lola
- Charles Baker as Kevin Stone
- Briony Martha as Juliet
- Castle Rock as Jeff Chase
- Cornelius Macarthy as David Parker
- Diane Weller as Zoe Hudson
- Francesca Cherruault as The North Elder

== Episodes ==
Season	Episodes	Originally released	
Season	Episodes	First released	Last released
1	26	August 31, 2023	November 20, 2023
2	13	October 11, 2024	

=== Season 1 (2023) ===
No. overall	No. in season	Title	Directed by	Written by	Original release date
1A
1	1	"W Stand for Wizen"	Alexander Jacob	Jill Girling; Lori Mather	August 31, 2023
2	2	"Magic Malaise"	Alexander Jacob	Jill Girling; Lori Mather; Arun Blair-Mangat	August 31, 2023
3	3	"Take the Stage"	Alexander Jacob	Andrew Burrows-Trotman	August 31, 2023
4	4	"Agreeable Pie"	Alexander Jacob	Jill Girling; Lori Mather	August 31, 2023
5	5	"Outside the Box"	Alexander Jacob	Jill Girling; Lori Mather	August 31, 2023
6	6	"Twinning is Winning"	Alexander Jacob	Arun Blair-Mangat	August 31, 2023
7	7	"Mirror Mirror on the Wall"	Annie Bradley	Jill Girling; Lori Mather	August 31, 2023
8	8	"Starcrossed"	Annie Bradley	Jill Girling; Lori Mather; Nada Yousif	August 31, 2023
9	9	"Fear of Flying"	Annie Bradley	Abena Taylor Smith	August 31, 2023
10	10	"Prom-a-thon"	Annie Bradley	Isaac Tomisak	August 31, 2023
11	11	"Bewitched Ballet"	Annie Bradley	Jill Girling; Lori Mather	August 31, 2023
12	12	"Juliet"	Annie Bradley	Jill Girling; Lori Mather	August 31, 2023
13	13	"The Scottish Play"	Annie Bradley	Jill Girling; Lori Mather	August 31, 2023
1B
14	14	"Release Me"	Robert Burke	Isaac Tomisak	November 20, 2023
15	15	"The Secrets we Keep"	Robert Burke	Jill Girling; Lori Mather	November 20, 2023
16	16	"Hybrid Hip Hop"	Robert Burke	Arun Blair-Mangat	November 20, 2023
17	17	"Red Velvet Magic"	Robert Burke	Jill Girling; Lori Mather	November 20, 2023
18	18	"Front Page Challenge"	Robert Burke	Jill Girling; Lori Mather	November 20, 2023
19	19	"Reveal the Feels"	Robert Burke	Jill Girling; Lori Mather	November 20, 2023
20	20	"Get Some Zest"	Robert Burke	Arun Blair-Mangat; Nada Yousif	November 20, 2023
21	21	"Model Students"	Alexander Jacob	Abena Taylor Smith	November 20, 2023
22	22	"Hell Week"	Alexander Jacob	Jill Girling; Lori Mather	November 20, 2023
23	23	"The Awakening"	Alexander Jacob	Arun Blair-Mangat	November 20, 2023
24	24	"As Above so Below"	Alexander Jacob	Nada Yousif	November 20, 2023
25	25	"Go with the flow"	Alexander Jacob	Jill Girling; Lori Mather	November 20, 2023
26	26	"Leap of Faith"	Alexander Jacob	Jill Girling; Lori Mather	November 20, 2023

=== Season 2 (2024) ===
No. overall	No. in season	Title	Directed by	Written by	Original release date
27	1	"Mystic Invasion"	Robert Burke	Jill Girling; Lori Mather	October 11, 2024
28	2	"The Wizen Archives"	Robert Burke	Jill Girling; Lori Mather	October 11, 2024
29	3	"Merge the Call"	Robert Burke	Jill Girling; Lori Mather	October 11, 2024
30	4	"Dancing in Paris"	Robert Burke	Jill Girling; Lori Mather	October 11, 2024
31	5	"Honey, I shrunk my roommate"	Robert Burke	Jill Girling; Lori Mather	October 11, 2024
32	6	"Ill Wishes"	Robert Burke	Jill Girling; Lori Mather	October 11, 2024
33	7	"The Bestie's Back"	Ronan Burke	Jill Girling; Lori Mather; Arun Blair-Mangat	October 11, 2024
34	8	"The Seer"	Ronan Burke	Jill Girling; Lori Mather	October 11, 2024
35	9	"The Drain Game"	Ronan Burke	Jill Girling; Lori Mather	October 11, 2024
36	10	"Who's Davey Parker?!"	Ronan Burke	Jill Girling; Lori Mather	October 11, 2024
37	11	"The Mystic Crypts"	Ronan Burke	Nada Yousif	October 11, 2024
38	12	"Check Mate"	Ronan Burke	Jill Girling; Lori Mather	October 11, 2024
39	13	"The Showdown"	Robert Burke	Jill Girling; Lori Mather	October 11, 2024

== Production ==
In June 2022, it was announced a new tween series Spellbound was in development from Find Me in Paris creators Jill Girling and Lori Mather. Cottonwood Media and ZDF would return with a new co-production partner France Télévisions.

It was also revealed with the series announcement that Hailey Melody Romain would lead the series as Cece Parker Jones. Rik Young, who played coach Armando Castillo in Find Me in Paris, would return for Spellbound. Other cast members confirmed in April 2023 included Margherita Barbieri, Abigail O'Regan, Etienne Moana, Sam Darius, Zac Gabriel Werb, Raven Dauda, Malou Beauvoir, Cameron James-King, Gomolémo Tsagaé, Imogen Mackie Walker, and Charles Baker.

Spellbound was in development and casting as of late 2021. Principal photography took place in Paris and Brussels from 1 August to 14 December 2022. The budget for the first season was €15.3 million.

== Release ==
Upon the series announcement in 2022, Hulu was once again attached to distribute the series in the United States, and later secured a 31 August 2023 release date. The CBC boarded as a Canadian distributor in April 2023 in English and French.

Hulu released a full-length trailer on 10 August 2023. All thirteen episodes of the second season were slated to be released on Hulu on 20 September 2024, but was delayed to 11 October 2024.

In France, the first season was released from 21 October 2023, and the second season was released from 18 October 2024, on France 4 under the Okoo block and its service.

== Reception ==
The Michigan Daily's Eliza Shearing was critical of the show. Johnny Loftus of the New York Post's Decider enjoyed the combination of a ballet school with witchcraft.
