= Jessica Lord =

English actress and dancer (born 1998)

- Born: Jessica Jane Lord; 29 July 1998 (age 28); Rochdale, England
- Education: O'Neill Collegiate and Vocational Institute; Story Arts Centre
- Occupations: Actress; dancer
- Years active: 2015–present

Jessica Jane Lord (born 29 July 1998) is an English actress and dancer. She is known for her roles as Lola in the fifth season of the Family series The Next Step (2017) and Lena Grisky in the Hulu series Find Me in Paris (2018–2020).

== Early life ==
Jessica Lord was born in Rochdale, Greater Manchester. When she was six, her family relocated to Port Perry, Canada. She attended high school at O'Neill Collegiate and Vocational Institute in Oshawa, specialising in dance. She later attended the Centennial College Theatre Arts and Performance.

== Career ==
In 2015, Lord made her onscreen debut as a dancer in four episodes of The Next Step. Then in 2017, she became a series regular on the fifth series of The Next Step as Lola. In 2018, Lord was cast in the Hulu series Find Me in Paris as Lena Grisky, a role she portrayed until the series ended in 2020. In 2019, she appeared in an episode of Ransom, and in 2020, she made an appearance in the pilot episode of Party of Five.

== Filmography ==
Year	Title	Role	Notes
2015	The Next Step	Jessica	4 episodes (series 3)
2016	Paranormal Witness	Marnie	Episode: "The Contract"
2017	The Next Step	Lola	Main role (series 5)
2018–2020	Find Me in Paris	Lena Grisky	Main role
2019	Ransom	Tatiana	Episode: "Prima"
2020	Party of Five	Alice	Episode: "Pilot"
2023	Binged to Death	Sienna	Film
2024	Murder at Hollow Creek	Jessica Rhodes	Film
2024	The Real Bros of Simi Valley: The Movie	Ventura	Film
2024	Christmas in the Spotlight	Bowyn Sykes	Film
