= Christy (musician) =

- Born: 16 September 1997 (age 28); Glasgow, Scotland
- Other name: Christy
- Years active: 2012–present
- Musical career
- Genres: Acoustic; folk-pop; blues rock
- Instruments: Vocals; guitar; keyboard
- Labels: Made Records; Decca Records
- Member of: Supanova

Christy O'Donnell (born 16 September 1997) is a Scottish musician and actor. He is known for his roles in the films Moon Dogs (2016), Knuckledust (2020), and the series Find Me in Paris (2018–2020). In 2020, he began releasing music under the moniker Christy.

== Early life and career ==
O'Donnell is from Castlemilk on the South Side of Glasgow. He left school at sixteen after struggling with dyslexia and began busking on Sauchiehall Street. He then formed a boy band titled Supanova with his friends Harris Hiscoe and Gregor Coleman. They toured Scotland and played at Savifest 2012.

O'Donnell made his acting debut in the 2016 independent film Moon Dogs. He was then cast in the 2018 tween time travel-dance series Find Me in Paris as Henri Duquet, a role he played for all three seasons. A French-German production, the series aired on different channels, including Hulu in the United States and Nickelodeon in the United Kingdom. While filming in Paris, O'Donnell was invited to open for Rufus Wainwright on the French leg of his tour in late 2017. After the end of Find Me in Paris, O'Donnell appeared in Knuckledust. He contributed to the soundtracks of both projects.

In 2020, O'Donnell began releasing singles under the name Christy as well as his debut EP Homegrown with MADE Records. This was followed by further singles and his second EP Somebody Else Instead in 2021. O'Donnell was named One to Watch by Amazon Music that year. O'Donnell then began working with Decca Records to release more singles in 2022 and 2023, as well as an acoustic EP titled Coast to Coast. He was one of 16 Scottish acts to feature at the 2023 Great Escape Festival.

== Artistry ==
O'Donnell grew up listening to Robbie Williams as his teacher would put it on in class. He has cited Ray Charles, John Martyn, and Chet Baker as his musical influences. His music has also been compared to Jeff Buckley, Chris Martin, and Bon Iver, as well as Paolo Nutini and Alabama Shakes.

== Discography ==
=== Albums and EPs ===
Title	Details
Homegrown	Released: 2020 Label: Made Records
Somebody Else Instead	Released: 2021 Label: Made Records
Coast to Coast	Released: 2023 Label: Decca Records
In Denial	Released: TBA Label: Decca Records

=== Singles ===
Year	Title	Album
2020	"On My Mind"	Homegrown
2020	"Remember Me Well"	Homegrown
2020	"Pictures"	Homegrown
2020	"Dancing with Air"	Homegrown
2020	"When We Get Old"	—N/a
2020	"When We Get Old" (Home Version)	Somebody Else Instead
2020	"This Road"	—N/a
2021	"Burned Out"	—N/a
2021	"Forever"	Somebody Else Instead
2021	"A Better Place"	Somebody Else Instead
2022	"In Denial"	In Denial
2023	"Without You"	—N/a
2023	"I Don't Love You"	Coast to Coast
2023	"Heart Shaped Hole"	Coast to Coast
2023	"Coast to Coast"	Coast to Coast
2025	"Let You Down"	—N/a
2025	"Stranger" with Lexie Carroll	—N/a
2025	"Feel Life"	—N/a

== Filmography ==
Year	Title	Role	Notes
2016	Moon Dogs	Thor	Soundtrack credits
2017	Clique	Student Superhero	1 episode
2018–2020	Find Me in Paris	Henri Duquet	Main role; soundtrack credits
2020	Knuckledust	Private Bench	Soundtrack credits
2021	Annika	Danny Hendry	1 episode
