= Olivier Richters =

Dutch bodybuilder and actor (born 1989)

- Born: 5 September 1989 (age 37); Hilversum, Netherlands
- Other name: "The Dutch Giant"
- Occupations: bodybuilder; model; actor; CEO
- Years active: 2007–present
- Height: 2.18 m (7 ft 2 in)
- Spouse: Desiree Stuijt (m. 2026)
- Children: 1
- Professional bodybuilder

Best statistics
- Weight: 160 kg (350 lb)

Olivier Richters (born 5 September 1989) is a Dutch professional bodybuilder and actor. Known as The Dutch Giant, Richters stands at 2.18 metres (7 ft 2 in) tall. After pursuing a career in bodybuilding, Richters focused more intentionally on his acting career, portraying characters such as Ursa in the 2021 film Black Widow. He also appeared in The King's Man and The Electrical Life of Louis Wain in 2021, in Indiana Jones and the Dial of Destiny in 2023, and the third season of Reacher in 2025.

== Early life ==
Richters was born in Hilversum, North Holland, on 5 September 1989. From a young age, Richters towered over students of his age. While he continued to grow, Richters developed pectus excavatum, which required surgery in his childhood, breaking his ribcage and allowing the ribs to regrow to rectify the issue. By 19, Richters had grown to 2.18 metres (7 ft 2 in) tall, yet weighed under 80 kilograms (180 lb). This motivated Richters to seek a "change", and to pursue bodybuilding.

== Bodybuilding career ==
Richters started to train in 2007, but did not start to pursue bodybuilding until 2013. After 8 years of training, Richters had gained nearly 75 kilograms (165 lb) of mass, predominantly composed of lean muscle. In 2021, he also took home the World Record for the "tallest professional bodybuilder", 12.7 centimetres (5.0 in) taller than Hafþór Júlíus Björnsson. Following this feat, Richters was featured on the cover of the November 2018 Netherlands' edition of Men's Health, and the subject of a documentary by the magazine. To achieve his bodybuilding goals, Richters rigorously committed to consuming up to 7000 calories a day spread over seven meals.

== Acting career ==
After a few minor television roles in the early 2010's, Richters pursued a career in acting more intentionally from 2018 onwards, appearing in the 2018 horror/comedy film Ravers. Richters has stated that his inspiration for his acting career is Richard Kiel, the actor of equal height who had portrayed the henchman Jaws in two James Bond films. Since 2018, Richters has appeared in films such as Knuckledust, Black Widow, The Electrical Life of Louis Wain, The King's Man, Indiana Jones and the Dial of Destiny, and Borderlands. On television, Richters has been cast in shows such as Gangs of London and Reacher, appearing as the secondary antagonist in the third season of the latter.

== Lifestyle and health ==
Due to his size, Richters maintains a regimen of 5,000 calorie intake for filming, and 6,500 to 7,000 calories for all other purposes, within a 24 hour period. The intake is spread out in seven meals, with one of them at 3:00 a.m., consisting of carbs, up to 1,000 grams of various meats and vegetables, in addition to an oat shake, made of "ultra-fine oats, blended with a whey scoop". In his interview with Adil Ray on Good Morning Britain, Richters maintained that he is "pushed" to keep up with his diet.

Richters was born with pectus excavatum, causing the bones of his ribcage to grow in such a way to squeeze the cardiac muscle. CT-scans revealed his heart was 20% smaller than it should have been. He underwent a procedure involving breaking the ribs and allowing the heart and lungs to continue growing, something made possible due to his still young age at the time, and extending his lifespan. Richters spent six months recovering—two under morphine, the third relearning basic mobility—walking, cycling and swimming. In the fourth month, he began a return to weightlifting.

According to The Times, Richters' stature is the result of the natural growth process and he does not suffer from gigantism, a condition in which a tumor affects the pituitary gland, causing abnormal height growth. In 2020, a MyHeritage DNA test revealed he has 48.2% Scandinavian, 34.8% English, and 17% Northwestern European descent.

In March 2013, Richters and his two siblings founded Muscle Meat, a company that provides athletes with resources and foods supplements.

== Filmography ==
=== Film ===
Year	Title	Role	Notes
2013	Points of View	Harmonium Player	
2018	Ravers	Warehouse Guy	
2019	Naile	Iwan	Short film
2020	Knuckledust	Rawbone	
2021	Black Widow	Ursa	
2021	Miami Heat	Olivier	
2021	The Electrical Life of Louis Wain	Journeyman Boxer	
2021	The King's Man	Huge Machine Shack Guard	
2023	Indiana Jones and the Dial of Destiny	Hauke	
2024	Borderlands	Krom	
2026	Street Fighter	Zangief	

=== Television ===
Year	Title	Role	Notes
2014	Fashion Planet	Assistant Photographer	
2020	Gangs of London	Duncan	
2025	Reacher	Paul "Paulie" van Hoven	Main cast
