= Black Widow (2021 film) =

Marvel Studios film

- Theatrical release poster
- Directed by: Cate Shortland
- Screenplay by: Eric Pearson
- Story by: Jac Schaeffer; Ned Benson
- Based on: Marvel Comics
- Produced by: Kevin Feige
- Starring: Scarlett Johansson; Florence Pugh; David Harbour; O-T Fagbenle; Olga Kurylenko; William Hurt; Ray Winstone; Rachel Weisz
- Cinematography: Gabriel Beristain
- Edited by: Leigh Folsom Boyd; Matthew Schmidt
- Music by: Lorne Balfe
- Production company: Marvel Studios
- Distributed by: Walt Disney Studios Motion Pictures
- Release dates: June 29, 2021 (world premieres); July 9, 2021 (United States)
- Running time: 134 minutes
- Country: United States
- Language: English
- Budget: $288.5 million
- Box office: $379.8 million

Black Widow is a 2021 American superhero film based on Marvel Comics featuring the character of the same name. Produced by Marvel Studios and distributed by Walt Disney Studios Motion Pictures, it is the 24th film in the Marvel Cinematic Universe (MCU). The film was directed by Cate Shortland from a screenplay by Eric Pearson and stars Scarlett Johansson as Natasha Romanoff / Black Widow alongside Florence Pugh, David Harbour, O-T Fagbenle, Olga Kurylenko, William Hurt, Ray Winstone, and Rachel Weisz. Mostly set during the events of Captain America: Civil War (2016), the film sees Romanoff on the run and forced to confront her past as a Russian spy before she became an Avenger.

Lionsgate Films began developing a Black Widow film in April 2004, with David Hayter attached to write and direct. The project did not move forward and the character's film rights had reverted to Marvel Studios by June 2006. Johansson was cast in the role for several MCU films beginning with Iron Man 2 (2010), and began discussing a solo film with Marvel. Work began in late 2017 and Shortland was hired in July 2018. Jac Schaeffer and Ned Benson contributed to the script before Pearson joined. The film was written to be a prequel that expands on Romanoff's history and helps end her MCU story following the character's death in Avengers: Endgame (2019). Shortland put an emphasis on the fight sequences and said this was the most violent MCU film so far. Filming took place from May to October 2019 in Norway, England, Budapest, Morocco, and Macon, Georgia.

Black Widow premiered at events around the world on June 29, 2021, and was released in the United States on July 9, simultaneously in theaters and through Disney+ with Premier Access. It is the first film in Phase Four of the MCU, and was delayed three times from an original May 2020 release date due to the COVID-19 pandemic. Black Widow broke several pandemic box office records and grossed over $379 million worldwide. (Note: Disney announced that Black Widow also earned $67 million globally from Disney+ Premier Access in its opening weekend. This is not factored into box office grosses.) The film received positive reviews from critics, with particular praise for the action sequences and for the performances of Johansson and Pugh. In July 2021, Johansson filed a lawsuit against Disney over the simultaneous release, which was settled two months later.

== Plot ==
In 1995, super soldier Alexei Shostakov and Black Widow assassin Melina Vostokoff work as Russian undercover agents, posing as a family in Ohio with Natasha Romanoff and Yelena Belova as their daughters. They steal S.H.I.E.L.D. intel and escape to Cuba where their boss, General Dreykov, has Romanoff and Belova taken to the Red Room for training as Widows. In the following decades, Shostakov is imprisoned in Russia while Romanoff and Belova become successful, dangerous assassins. Romanoff eventually defects to S.H.I.E.L.D. after helping Clint Barton bomb Dreykov's Budapest office, which apparently kills Dreykov and his young daughter Antonia.

In 2016, Romanoff is a fugitive for violating the Sokovia Accords. (Note: As depicted in Captain America: Civil War (2016)) She escapes from U.S. Secretary of State Thaddeus Ross and flees to a safehouse in Norway supplied by Rick Mason. Meanwhile, Belova kills a rogue former Widow but comes in contact with a synthetic gas that neutralizes the Red Room's chemical mind-control agent. Belova sends antidote vials to Romanoff, hoping she and the Avengers can free the other Widows, and goes into hiding. When Romanoff is unknowingly driving with the vials in her car, Red Room agent Taskmaster attacks her. Romanoff escapes from Taskmaster and realizes that the vials came from Budapest. There she finds Belova, who reveals that Dreykov is alive and the Red Room is still active. Widows and Taskmaster attack them, but Romanoff and Belova evade them and meet with Mason, who supplies them with a helicopter.

Romanoff and Belova break Shostakov out of prison to learn Dreykov's location, and he directs them to Vostokoff, who lives on a farm outside Saint Petersburg. There she is refining the chemical mind control process used on the Widows. Vostokoff alerts Dreykov and his agents arrive to take them, but Romanoff convinces Vostokoff to help them and the pair use face mask technology to switch places. At the Red Room, a secret aerial facility, Vostokoff frees Shostakov and Belova from their restraints. Dreykov sees through Romanoff's disguise. He reveals that Taskmaster is Antonia, who suffered damage in the Budapest bombing that was so severe Dreykov had to put technology in her head to save her. This turned Antonia into the perfect soldier, capable of mimicking the actions of anyone she sees. Romanoff is unable to attack Dreykov due to a pheromone lock installed in every Widow, but negates that by breaking her own nose and severing her olfactory nerve. Shostakov battles Taskmaster while Vostokoff disables one of the facility's engines, and they then lock Taskmaster in a cell.

Dreykov escapes as other Widows attack Romanoff, but Belova exposes them to the antidote. Romanoff copies the locations of other Widows worldwide from Dreykov's computer as the facility begins to explode and fall. She retrieves two surviving antidote vials and frees Taskmaster from the locked cell. Vostokoff and Shostakov escape via a plane while Belova blows up Dreykov's aircraft, killing him. In freefall, Romanoff gives Belova a parachute before battling Taskmaster. After landing, Romanoff uses one antidote vial on Taskmaster and gives the other to Belova along with the locations of the other mind-controlled Widows so she can find and free them. Belova, Vostokoff, and Shostakov say goodbye to Romanoff and leave with Antonia and the freed Widows. Two weeks later, Mason supplies Romanoff with a Quinjet to use in freeing the imprisoned Avengers.

In a post-credits scene set after Romanoff's death, (Note: As depicted in Avengers: Endgame (2019)) Valentina Allegra de Fontaine visits Belova at Romanoff's grave. De Fontaine blames Romanoff's death on Barton and assigns him as Belova's next target.

== Cast ==
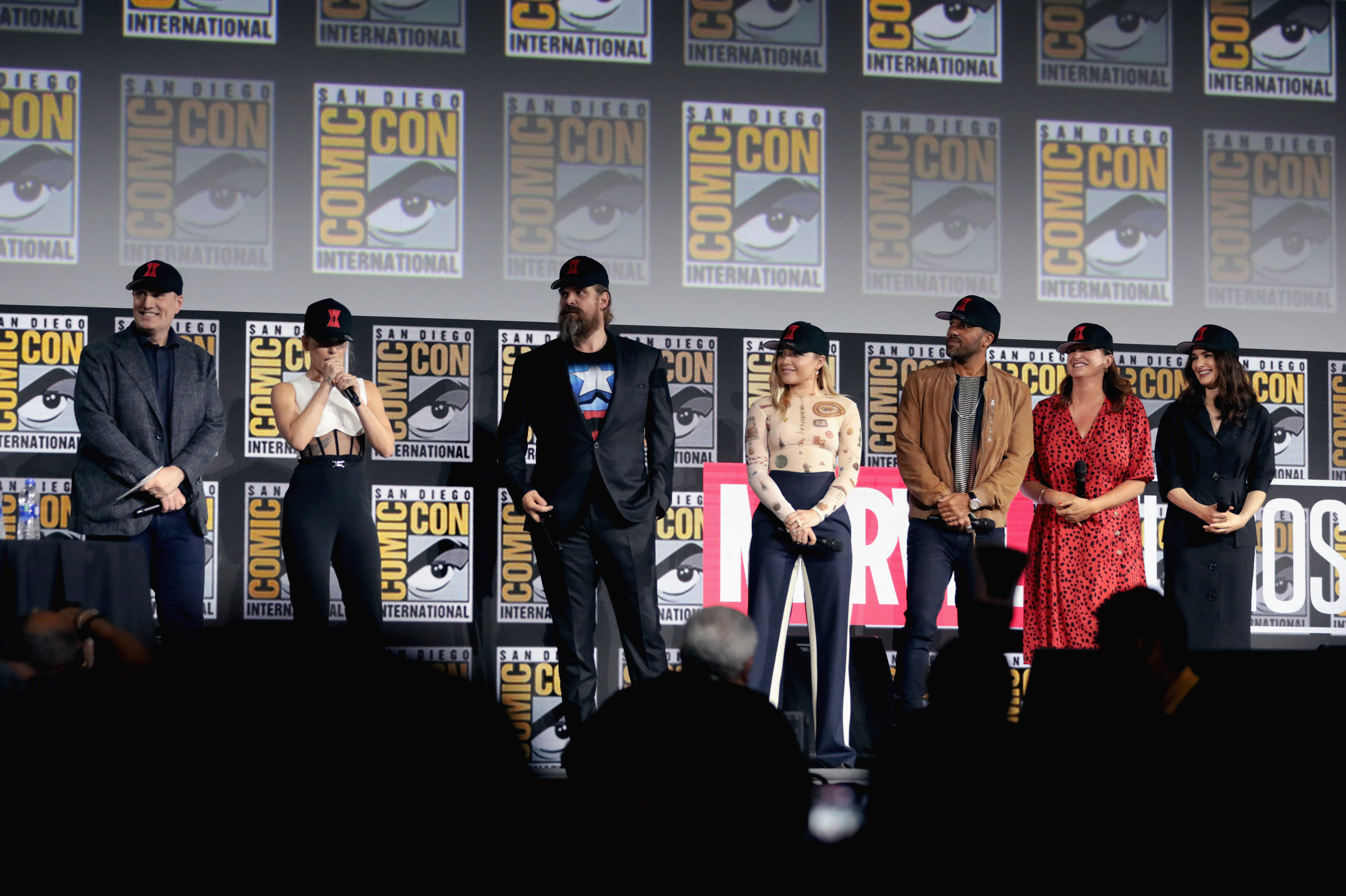
From left: Feige, Johansson, Harbour, Pugh, Fagbenle, Shortland, and Weisz at the 2019 San Diego Comic-Con

- Scarlett Johansson as Natasha Romanoff / Black Widow:
  An Avenger, highly trained former-KGB assassin, and former agent of S.H.I.E.L.D. Romanoff is on the run and alone following the events of Captain America: Civil War (2016), which Johansson saw as an opportunity to show the character as "a woman who has come into her own and is making independent and active choices for herself". Director Cate Shortland said Romanoff's ambiguous psychological journey was the center of the story, and writer Eric Pearson said the film would show Romanoff become the "more emotional, vulnerable and at peace" version of the character seen in Avengers: Infinity War (2018) and Avengers: Endgame (2019). Because the character dies in Endgame, Johansson said Black Widow allowed her to leave the MCU "on a high note" and said her work portraying Romanoff was now complete. Ever Anderson portrays a young Natasha Romanoff. Anderson, who speaks Russian, felt her background in taekwondo and gymnastics training was helpful for the role.
- Florence Pugh as Yelena Belova:
  A sister to Romanoff who was trained in the Red Room as a Black Widow. Johansson said Belova was an early inclusion in the film who could stand on her own alongside Romanoff. Pugh said there was a generational difference between the two, describing Belova as "unapologetic, and confident in herself, and curious... and emotionally brave". She admired Belova's bluntness and determination, and noted that the character is a skilled fighter who does not know how to live a normal life. Shortland said Romanoff would be handing the baton to Belova in the film, and during filming Pugh looked to Johansson for guidance on meeting the demands of making Marvel films. Johansson wanted to avoid an antagonistic dynamic between the two characters, instead having a sister-like but contentious relationship that Pugh characterized as "a sister story that really hones in on grief, on pain, on abuse, on being a victim—and living with being a victim". Violet McGraw portrays a young Yelena Belova.
- David Harbour as Alexei Shostakov / Red Guardian:
  The Russian super-soldier counterpart to Captain America and father-figure to Romanoff and Belova. Harbour said Shostakov was not heroic or noble, and was both comically and tragically flawed. Shostakov claims that he fought Captain America in the 1980s, and Pearson felt the character actually believes this despite it being impossible in the MCU timeline. Harbour and Shortland discussed Ricky Gervais's performance in The Office (2001–2003) and Philip Seymour Hoffman's in The Savages (2007), described as "comedy that comes out of real domestic need". Harbour had already grown his facial hair for the fourth season of Stranger Things (2016–2025), and he gained weight for the role to be 280 pounds (127 kg). He then lost 60 pounds (27 kg) over the course of filming to portray a younger version of the character in the opening flashback sequence.
- O-T Fagbenle as Rick Mason:
  An ally from Romanoff's S.H.I.E.L.D. past who has a romantic history with her. Fagbenle described Mason as a "finder for people who aren't so affiliated with armies" who assists Romanoff in that manner. On why a romance between Mason and Romanoff is not directly explored in the film, Fagbenle said the film was "bigger than that" and their relationship was part of Romanoff's larger family instead. Beyond Pearson's script, Fagbenle developed Mason's backstory with Shortland and Johansson. As Taskmaster's identity was kept secret, many people assumed Mason would secretly take up the mantle, which Fagbenle had to deny even to his personal trainer. The film's final scene, in which Mason provides Romanoff with a Quinjet, was added during reshoots in early 2020 after test audiences liked seeing Romanoff and Mason together.
- Olga Kurylenko as Antonia Dreykov / Taskmaster:
  Dreykov's daughter who completes missions for the Red Room. She has photographic reflexes that allow her to mimic opponents' fighting styles, and uses techniques from superheroes such as Black Widow, Iron Man, Captain America, the Winter Soldier, Spider-Man, Black Panther, and Hawkeye. Several body doubles were required to portray the character's various skills. Kurylenko said much of Antonia's pain is internal, and described her relationship with Dreykov as abusive since Dreykov uses her "as a tool [and] has her do whatever he wants". Taskmaster is revealed to be Antonia in the film instead of the comic book counterpart Tony Masters since Masters did not fit into the film's story and it was more natural to Pearson to tie Taskmaster into a "loose end from Natasha's past". Ryan Kiera Armstrong portrays a young Antonia Dreykov.
- William Hurt as Thaddeus Ross:
  The United States Secretary of State and a former U.S. Army general. Regarding Ross's mindset in Black Widow following the character's attempt to control the Avengers in Civil War, Hurt said there was "fatigue setting in" and Ross was a "soldier on the last hill... the way he can strike back against the changing world would be by capturing Natasha Romanoff."
- Ray Winstone as Dreykov:
  A Russian general and the head of the Red Room. Pearson felt the film needed a villain that could fit within its timeframe undetected to avoid contradicting the events of Infinity War. He described Dreykov as a coward who is "puppeteering things" from the shadows and does not care about hurting others.
- Rachel Weisz as Melina Vostokoff:
  A seasoned spy trained in the Red Room as a Black Widow and mother-figure to Romanoff and Belova who is now one of the Red Room's lead scientists. Compared to Vostokoff's comic book counterpart, who becomes the supervillain Iron Maiden, Weisz felt the film's version was more ambiguous and layered, with a deadpan personality and no sense of humor which Weisz found amusing. Weisz was given a tailored Black Widow suit for the film which she called an "iconic" piece of clothing that was "a lot to live up to". Weisz decided to portray Vostokoff as more affectionate towards Shostakov, rather than dismissive.

Additionally, Liani Samuel, Michelle Lee, and Nanna Blondell appear as Red Room assassins Lerato, Oksana, and Ingrid, respectively, while Jade Xu portrays another Black Widow who was later identified as Helen in Shang-Chi and the Legend of the Ten Rings (2021). Olivier Richters portrays Ursa Major, a fellow inmate of Shostakov's. The film's post-credits scene sees Julia Louis-Dreyfus reprising her role as Valentina Allegra de Fontaine from the Disney+ series The Falcon and the Winter Soldier (2021) in an uncredited cameo appearance. Jeremy Renner reprises his MCU role as Clint Barton in an uncredited voice-only cameo.

== Production ==
=== Background ===
"What I tried to do was use the backdrop of the splintered Soviet Empire—a lawless insane asylum with 400-some odd nuclear missile silos. It was all about loose nukes, and I felt it was very timely and very cool. Unfortunately, as I was coming up on the final draft, a number of female vigilante movies came out. We had Tomb Raider and Kill Bill, which were the ones that worked, but then we had BloodRayne and Ultraviolet and Æon Flux. Æon Flux didn't open well, and three days after it opened, the studio said, 'We don't think it's time to do this movie.'"

— David Hayter on his version of the film and why it failed to move forward

In February 2004, Lionsgate acquired the film rights for the Marvel Comics character Black Widow, and in April announced David Hayter as writer and director of the film, with Marvel Studios' Avi Arad producing. By June 2006, Lionsgate had dropped the project and the rights reverted to Marvel Studios. Hayter and Marvel tried getting another financier to develop the project, but Hayter did not feel that they found another place "that was willing to take the movie, and the character, seriously". Hayter said this left him heartbroken, and he hoped the film would be made some day.

Marvel Studios entered early talks with Emily Blunt to play Black Widow in the Marvel Cinematic Universe (MCU) film Iron Man 2 (2010) in January 2009, but she was unable to take the role due to a previous commitment to star in Gulliver's Travels (2010). In March 2009, Scarlett Johansson signed on to play Natasha Romanoff / Black Widow, with her deal including options for multiple films. In September 2010, Marvel Studios President Kevin Feige said discussions with Johansson had already taken place regarding a Black Widow standalone film, but Marvel's focus was on the crossover film The Avengers (2012). Johansson reprised her role in that film, as well as in Captain America: The Winter Soldier (2014), Avengers: Age of Ultron (2015), Captain America: Civil War (2016), Avengers: Infinity War (2018), and Avengers: Endgame (2019). After the release of Age of Ultron, Johansson revealed that the number of films on her contract had been adjusted since she first signed to match the "demand of the character", as Marvel had not anticipated the audience's positive response to the character and Johansson's performance.

After teasing Black Widow's past in Age of Ultron, Feige said in February 2014 that he would like to see it explored further in a solo film. Development work for this had already started, including a "pretty in depth" treatment by Nicole Perlman who co-wrote Marvel Studios' Guardians of the Galaxy (2014). The following April, Johansson expressed interest in starring in a Black Widow film and said it would be driven by demand from the audience. That July, Hayter expressed interest in reviving the project for Marvel, while director Neil Marshall said a month later that he "would love to do a Black Widow film". Marshall said he was fascinated by a superhero with "extraordinary skills" rather than superpowers who is also an ex-KGB assassin. In April 2015, Johansson spoke more on the possibility of a solo Black Widow film, seeing the potential to explore the character's different layers as depicted in her previous appearances. However, she felt that the character was being "used well in this part of the universe" at that time. While promoting Civil War the next April, Feige noted that due to Marvel's announced schedule of films for Phase Three of the MCU, any potential Black Widow film would be four or five years away. He added that Marvel was "creatively and emotionally" committed to making a Black Widow film eventually.

Joss Whedon, the director of The Avengers and Avengers: Age of Ultron, said in July 2016 that he was open to directing a Black Widow film. He liked the idea of making it a paranoid spy thriller that was "John le Carré on crack". In October, Johansson discussed the potential film being a prequel, saying, "you can bring it back to Russia. You could explore the Widow program. There's all kinds of stuff that you could do with it." She cautioned that she may not want to wear a "skin-tight catsuit" for much longer. The next February, Johansson said she would dedicate herself to making any potential Black Widow film "amazing. It would have to be the best version that movie could possibly be. Otherwise, I would never do it ... [it would] have to be its own standalone [film] and its own style and its own story." Due to the development work already done and the public support for the project, Marvel Studios decided to move forward with the film at the beginning of the MCU's Phase Four in 2020 following the conclusion of the Infinity Saga storyline in Endgame. Johansson said this decision had become "more of a reality" during the filming of Infinity War. Following Romanoff's death in Endgame, Johansson felt there was "no pressing urgency" to make a Black Widow film and this would improve the project's quality.

=== Development ===
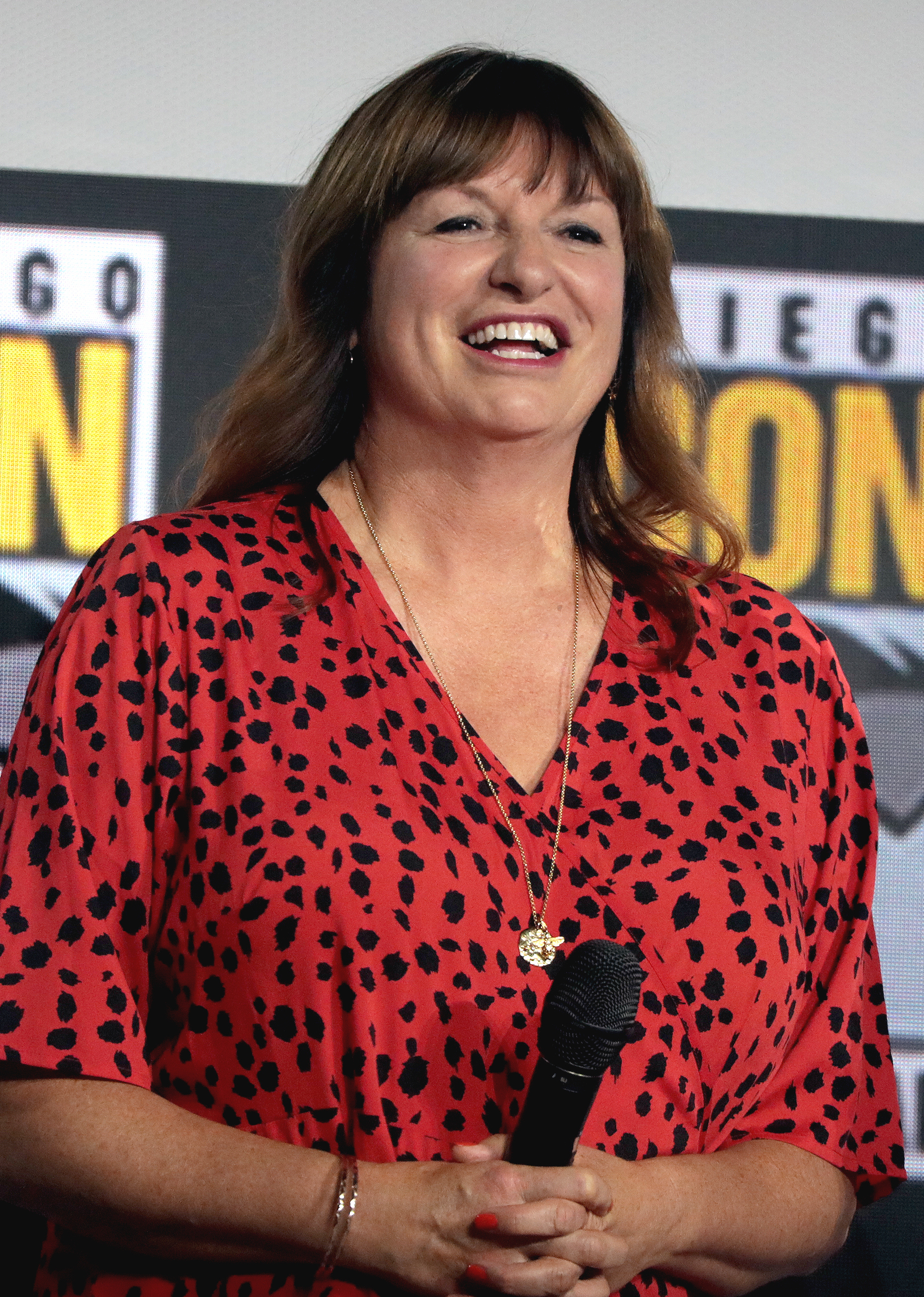
Director Cate Shortland at the 2019 San Diego Comic-Con

Feige met with Johansson to discuss the direction of a Black Widow film in October 2017. Marvel then began meeting with writers for the project, including Jac Schaeffer and Jessica Gao. Gao's pitch was influenced by Grosse Pointe Blank (1997), in which Romanoff would have been planted in a high school to assassinate a target and then 20 years later attends a high school reunion where she has to deal with the fallout of her earlier actions. The pitch heavily featured the character She-Hulk, and Marvel Studios executive Brad Winderbaum felt Gao was instead pitching a She-Hulk film that featured Black Widow. Gao would later be hired by Marvel Studios as the head writer for the Disney+ television series She-Hulk: Attorney at Law (2022). Schaeffer met with Feige in December, and was hired to write the screenplay by the end of 2017. Schaeffer and Johansson were set to discuss the direction of the film at the beginning of February 2018.

Marvel began meeting with female directors to potentially take on the project, part of a priority push by major film studios to hire female directors for franchises. By the end of April 2018, the studio had met with over 65 directors for the project in an "extremely thorough" search, including Deniz Gamze Ergüven, Chloé Zhao, Amma Asante, and Lynn Shelton. Lucrecia Martel was also approached, but was discouraged when she was told that she would not have to "worry about the action scenes". She also felt the music and visual effects of Marvel films were "horrible". Coralie Fargeat was in contention following the success of her film Revenge (2017), but chose to develop The Substance (2024) instead, believing Marvel would not give her final cut privilege. Zhao took herself out of contention after deciding that Black Widow was not the right story for her, and because the planned filming schedule conflicted with her film Nomadland (2020) which was a story Zhao wanted to tell; she went on to direct Marvel's Eternals (2021). In the following months, a shortlist of 49 directors was made before the top choices of Cate Shortland, Asante, and Maggie Betts met with Feige and Johansson in June. Mélanie Laurent and Kimberly Peirce were also in the "next-to-final mix". Johansson was a fan of Shortland's previous female-starring film Lore (2012), and was the one who had approached her about directing the film; Shortland was hired in July, and watched all of Romanoff's MCU appearances in preparation for making the film.

The Hollywood Reporter reported in October 2018 that Johansson would earn $15 million for the film, an increase from the "low-seven figure salary" that she earned for starring in The Avengers. Chris Evans and Chris Hemsworth each earned $15 million for the third films in their MCU franchises—Civil War and Thor: Ragnarok (2017), respectively—as well as for Infinity War and Endgame. Despite The Hollywood Reporter claiming that their report had been confirmed by "multiple knowledgeable sources", Marvel Studios disputed its accuracy and said they "never publicly disclose salaries or deal terms". The Walt Disney Company later said Johansson had earned $20 million by the end of July 2021 for her work on the film, including her role as an executive producer.

As Romanoff dies during the events of Endgame, the film is set earlier in the MCU timeline. It primarily takes place between the main plot of Civil War and that film's final scene, in which the Avengers escape from prison. Johansson and Feige felt this was "the best place to start" because it is the first time that Romanoff is on her own and not tied to a larger organization such as the Red Room, S.H.I.E.L.D., or the Avengers. This setting means the film is not an origin story for Romanoff, which Feige wanted to avoid because he felt that was the expected direction for a prequel to go. He was influenced by the television series Better Call Saul (2015–2022), which is a prequel to the series Breaking Bad (2008–2013), calling it "a wonderful example of a prequel that almost completely stands on its own... because it informs you about so many things you didn't know about before".

=== Pre-production ===
In February 2019, Ned Benson was hired to rewrite the script, and Feige confirmed that, despite rumors, the studio did not want the film to receive an R-rating from the Motion Picture Association. The following month, Florence Pugh entered negotiations to join the cast as a spy, later revealed to be Yelena Belova. Marvel had been considering Pugh for the role since late 2018, but began looking at other actresses in early 2019, including Saoirse Ronan, who passed on the role. The studio returned to Pugh after she received strong reviews for her performance in the film Fighting with My Family (2019). Devin Grayson and J. G. Jones, who co-created Belova, expected to receive $25,000 for her role in the film based on a 2007 agreement with Marvel Comics, but ultimately received $5,000 due to a provision in the contract which allowed Marvel to reduce creators' payments; after Grayson went public with this, Marvel agreed to pay her the remaining amount. In April 2019, Pugh was confirmed to have been cast alongside David Harbour, Rachel Weisz, and O-T Fagbenle. An early version of the script included a scene from Civil War featuring Romanoff and Robert Downey Jr.'s Tony Stark / Iron Man, and Downey was reported to be appearing in the film. Fans also expected Jeremy Renner to reprise his MCU role as Clint Barton. Shortland and Feige ultimately decided against including other heroes so Romanoff could stand on her own, though Renner does have an uncredited voice-only cameo.

Eric Pearson, who started his writing career in Marvel's screenwriting program and went on to work on several MCU projects, was hired during pre-production to rewrite the film's script again. He ultimately received sole screenwriter credit, with Schaeffer and Benson receiving story credits. Shortland and Johansson had decided to take inspiration from the television series The Americans (2013–2018), which is about a Russian undercover spy family, by introducing Romanoff's own "family" of Russian spies including Belova. When Pearson joined the film, the opening sequence—a prologue set in the 1990s with Romanoff and her "family" living undercover in the Midwestern United States—had already been written. The rest of the film focuses on this family coming back together in the "present day", with a pivotal scene later in the film where they are all reunited around a dining table. Of all the MCU projects that he had worked on, Pearson found Black Widow's setting within the MCU timeline to be the most difficult to get right. This was because he wanted the audience to feel that the villain could succeed without breaking the timeline, which would be difficult considering audiences had already seen Civil War, Infinity War, and Endgame. He chose to focus on the Red Room—where the Black Widows are trained—and its leader, who "wields power from the shadows". Pearson thought that the film's spy thriller tone helped alleviate his concerns about the villain. A scene at the end of the film in which Thaddeus Ross pursues Romanoff was deliberately left unresolved, as Shortland wanted to leave the audience "on a high" and questioning how Romanoff escapes rather than exhausted with another fight. This is then followed by a scene that connects this film to the end of Civil War by showing Romanoff leaving on a Quinjet to save the Avengers. She is wearing a vest given to her by Belova and has dyed her hair blonde, which matches the character's appearance in Infinity War.

Pearson said there were discussions about ensuring the film was an appropriate farewell for Romanoff. They wanted it to feature "the greatest hits" of the character, including expanding on the backstory that was mentioned in The Avengers. In that film, Romanoff and Barton discuss a past mission in Budapest and there is a mention of "Dreykov's daughter". Black Widow expands on the Budapest hints by having Romanoff return there and revealing some of that mission's details. Dreykov is revealed to be the head of the Red Room, who Romanoff believes to have been killed during the earlier Budapest mission. Johansson wanted the film to comment on the #MeToo movement which saw women supporting each other and "coming through these shared experiences of trauma on the other side", and this is seen in the way that Romanoff is forced, by the arrival of Belova, to confront Dreykov and her past trauma. Johansson was grateful to have the film to comment on these ideas. Pearson felt the truth behind "Dreykov's daughter" needed to be "something pretty bad. Natasha is ashamed of it. We've been doing allusions to her having a dark past [throughout the MCU]... It had to be something actively tough that she did that haunts her dreams." He settled on the idea that Romanoff and Barton used Dreykov's young daughter as bait to kill him and believed the girl had also died in the process. There was "heated conversation" with Marvel over how much of Romanoff's dark past to show, and Pearson successfully argued for including this element. Early versions of the script included the comic book character Tony Masters / Taskmaster as a villain. Pearson moved towards the more subtle villain Dreykov who he felt fit better into the story and the timeline, but decided to reveal that Dreykov's daughter is alive and now a version of Taskmaster that he compared to a Terminator. He felt this was a way to have some "Marvel fun" within the otherwise grounded story. Fagbenle auditioned for the original version of Taskmaster, who he called a maniac with an African accent, and said the role was down to him and another actor. After the story changes, Marvel asked if Fagbenle was interested in playing Rick Mason instead, which he accepted.

=== Filming ===
Principal photography began on May 28, 2019, in Norway. Shortland took inspiration from such films as How to Train Your Dragon (2010), No Country for Old Men (2007), and Thelma & Louise (1991), as well as Captain America: The Winter Soldier. She looked at combat films and those with armies and militia, allowing her to imagine females in those roles to help translate that to Black Widow. Shortland also referenced fight scenes involving female characters in Alien (1979) and the Terminator franchise, and wanted the film's fights to resemble "real fights" rather than wrestling matches. She edited together fight scenes from different films into shorts that helped her explore the style of fighting that she wanted in the film. Shortland said this was the most violent film in the MCU and she wanted to approach that aspect with the same "truth" that she was approaching the rest of the film.

Early reports suggested that Rob Hardy would be the film's cinematographer, but he left the production before filming began. Gabriel Beristain served as cinematographer instead, having previously done so for the Marvel One-Shot short films Item 47 (2012) and Agent Carter (2013), for the television series Agent Carter (2015–2016), and for additional photography on Iron Man (2008) and six other MCU films. Beristain was initially not credited in Black Widow's trailers, as pointed out by Jeff Sneider at Collider who wondered if contractual obstacles were to blame for Marvel not crediting the cinematographer at that point. Sneider felt Beristain would be credited in later marketing materials, and his hiring was confirmed in the film's official press advance. Beristein later confirmed that he joined the film after production had already begun, opting to leave a television directing job and move to London so he could be the main cinematographer for an MCU film. Shortland preferred to avoid technical equipment where possible and prioritize natural lighting, which provided a challenge for Beristain in having to match the light of the location shoots to later additional photography filmed in Los Angeles. The naturalistic approach was also reflected in interior scenes, lighting from outside the set or using lights with strong diffusion to create the same effect. An anamorphic format was chosen to highlight the expansive movements and landscapes in the film, with a special system used that split the camera's image sensor from its body to help with this approach.

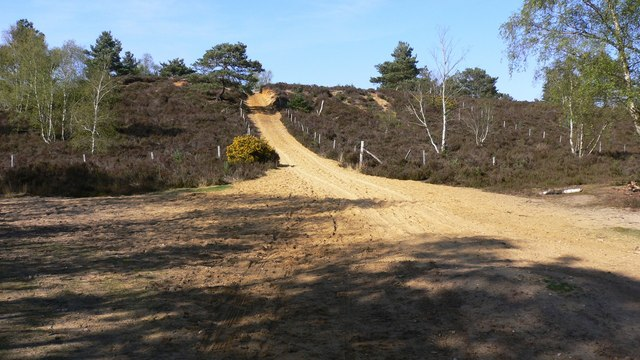
Hankley Common in Surrey, England, was made to look like a Russian farmstead for the film.

The production moved to Pinewood Studios in London in early June. Shortland hired someone to help Johansson and Pugh bond through trust exercises and other bonding activities, but the pair felt their "real bonding" happened during Pugh's first two days of filming when they were working on an early fight scene between Romanoff and Belova. Pugh had some stunt experience from her work on Fighting with My Family, and Johansson gave her advice that she had received from Samuel L. Jackson while working on Iron Man 2. Pearson was on set to hear a joke from Pugh about the "ridiculous" pose that Johansson often lands in while fighting as Romanoff throughout her MCU appearances, which led to him adding some jokes from Belova to Romanoff about the poses in the script. Ray Winstone joined the film's cast later in June, when filming took place on location in Budapest. 13 BMW X3s were used to create a car chase involving Romanoff and Belova in Budapest, with the crew often switching off the electronic stability control and safety assistance functions to be able to do what the script asked for. They also swapped the X3's electronic parking brake for a hydraulically actuated one. Second unit director Darrin Prescott explained that the crew would often "replace the engine or tear the entire body off the car and rebuild it from scratch". The sequence's plot and locations were adjusted to help Prescott create the "spontaneous" stunts that he wanted.

Shooting took place in mid-July 2019 at Hankley Common in Surrey, England, under the working title Blue Bayou. The site was made to look like a Russian farmstead, with added helicopter crash sites. The Thursley Parish Council objected to this filming, as it had occurred while Marvel Studios' application to use the site was still pending. The production planned to revisit the site in late August for further filming. Black Widow was officially announced at the 2019 San Diego Comic-Con later in July, with a release date of May 1, 2020, revealed alongside roles for some of the new cast members. In August, bodybuilder Olivier Richters revealed that he had been cast in the film, playing a character that was subsequently confirmed to be Ursa Major. That same month, crew undertook scanning and texture photography at the Well-Safe Guardian oil rig in the North Sea as a reference for visual effects. A wrap party was held at the end of September, before production moved to Macon, Georgia, for the week of September 30. Filming locations in Macon, including Terminal Station, were dressed to portray Albany, New York. Set photos from the start of October revealed that William Hurt would appear in the film, reprising his MCU role as Thaddeus Ross. Additional filming in Georgia took place in Atlanta and Rome. Also in early October, filming took place in Tangier, Morocco, with local production services provided by Zak Productions. Principal photography lasted for 87 days and officially wrapped on October 6, 2019.

=== Post-production ===
External videos
- Marvel Studios' Black Widow Opening Title Sequence presents the film's main title sequence, YouTube video from Perception's channel

Matthew Schmidt and Leigh Folsom Boyd edited the film. Pearson said the handling of Romanoff's Budapest backstory was "85% cracked" prior to filming, and the rest was determined during editing and additional photography. Winstone disliked the additional photography, saying it changed the character from what he and Shortland created and feeling that his performance was being criticized by Marvel Studios executives. He wanted his role to be recast instead, but was contractually obligated to return. A scene of Romanoff wearing underwear and a T-shirt that Shortland enjoyed due to "how sexy [Johansson] is [when] she's in control" was cut because test audiences criticized it as using the "male gaze". Black Widow is one of the few Marvel films to feature an opening credits sequence, which Feige explained was because Shortland felt strongly about exploring what Dreykov is responsible for at the beginning of the film. The sequence was designed by Perception, who worked with Shortland to film various vignettes on set that were made to look as if they were captured on 8 mm film, 90's digital video, and VHS. These were combined with old photographs and documents that Perception's team created and manipulated to tell the story.

In mid-March 2020, Disney removed the film from its release schedule due to the COVID-19 pandemic. In early April, Disney announced that Black Widow would be released on November 6, 2020, and the rest of their Phase Four slate of films were shifted to accommodate this. In September 2020, Disney pushed the release back again to May 7, 2021, followed by a third shift in March 2021 to July 9, 2021. In April 2021, following Julia Louis-Dreyfus's appearance as Valentina Allegra de Fontaine in the Marvel Studios television series The Falcon and the Winter Soldier (2021), Joanna Robinson of Vanity Fair reported that Louis-Dreyfus had been expected to first appear in Black Widow before the delays pushed its release to after The Falcon and the Winter Soldier's premiere on Disney+. Feige later confirmed this, explaining that Black Widow's post-credits scene was originally intended to be the character's introduction but instead became a reference to her appearance in the series. He said this was the only change to Marvel's Phase Four plans that was forced by the pandemic. The post-credits scene was added after Hawkeye (2021) showrunner Jonathan Igla expressed interest in having Yelena Belova appear in his series. Pearson was asked to write the scene, in which De Fontaine assigns Clint Barton as Belova's next target, without knowing who the target would be. Shortland considered the setting of the scene, at Romanoff's grave in a remote clearing, to be a response to fans who were upset that Romanoff did not receive a funeral in Endgame. Shortland said the character was private and would not have wanted a large funeral, so this scene allowed the character's ending "to be the grief the individuals felt, rather than a big public outpouring". Shortland said in May 2021 that the film had been completed a year prior and had not been altered, despite the release delays. Olga Kurylenko's role as Antonia Dreykov / Taskmaster was revealed with the film's release.

Original plate (top) and the completed shot (bottom) with visual effects by Digital Domain, for the film's final battle sequence

The film's visual effects vendors included Cinesite, Digital Domain, Industrial Light & Magic, Mammal Studios, SSVFX, Scanline VFX, Trixter, and Wētā FX. Digital Domain was responsible for the final battle sequence and completed around 320 visual effects shots for the film. They created the Red Room, an airborne fortress hidden in the clouds, which was inspired by the brutalist architecture of the Soviet Union. A combination of practical and visual effects were used to create the sequence where the Red Room is destroyed and falls from the sky: actors and stunt performers were filmed in a wind tunnel against bluescreens while being held with wires and mechanical arms, and the surrounding environment of sky and debris was created digitally. Cinesite primarily handled the Russian prison that Harbour's Alexei Shostakov / Red Guardian is found in. Wētā FX created the mountain range that surrounds the prison, based on photography from Svalbard, Norway, as well as an avalanche. Wētā also created the Mil Mi-8 helicopter that is seen in that sequence, while Cinesite created it for other sequences. For the pigs on the farm of Weisz's Melina Vostokoff, Wētā filmed live Kunekune pigs as reference for the digital pigs in the final shots.

Industrial Light & Magic completed approximately 800 VFX shots for the film, working on the opening airplane escape scene, the Budapest apartment fight and subsequent motorcycle and car chase, and the fight between Romanoff and a group of Black Widows in Dreykov's office. The opening airplane scene was created with half of an airplane rig on a hydraulic platform. Footage filmed on location in Atlanta was played on LED screens on the soundstage to create interactive lighting for the actors on set. To create the Budapest scenes, ILM worked with second unit director Darren Prescott. Romanoff and Belova's chase across the rooftops was a combination of practical and visual effects, while scenes involving smokestacks were created using virtual actors. The car chase scene in Budapest features a practical tank driven by Taskmaster that was created by Paul Corbould, the film's special effects supervisor. Digital cars were added to the scene to make it appear more dangerous and for better interaction with the tank. For the fight scene in Dreykov's office, ILM worked on the graphic displays in the background as well as the lighting that interacts with the Widows' bodies. In addition to creating the film's opening credits sequence, Perception designed the graphics for Dreykov's screens and other Red Room technology, researching Soviet Union technology for inspiration. Trixter created Taskmaster's mask and worked on several action sequences as well.

== Music ==
Alexandre Desplat was revealed to be composing the music for the film in January 2020. Late in post-production, Lorne Balfe replaced Desplat as composer, which Desplat confirmed in May 2020. Balfe briefly references Alan Silvestri's motif for Romanoff and main theme for the Avengers from The Avengers in the score, but otherwise wanted to focus on creating a new identity for Romanoff. His discussions with Shortland led to him writing an original piece in the style of Russian folk music that he thought Romanoff and Belova may have grown up listening to. The rest of his score developed from that piece, and also took inspiration from Russian composers Sergei Prokofiev and Igor Stravinsky. Balfe completed recording for the score at Abbey Road Studios as the COVID-19 pandemic began to impact studio recording sessions.

The film's opening credits sequence features a cover of Nirvana's "Smells Like Teen Spirit" by Think Up Anger, featuring Malia J, which was suggested by Perception. "American Pie" by Don McLean and "Cheap Thrills" by Sia are also featured in the film. A soundtrack album featuring Balfe's score was released digitally by Marvel Music and Hollywood Records on July 9, 2021.

== Marketing ==
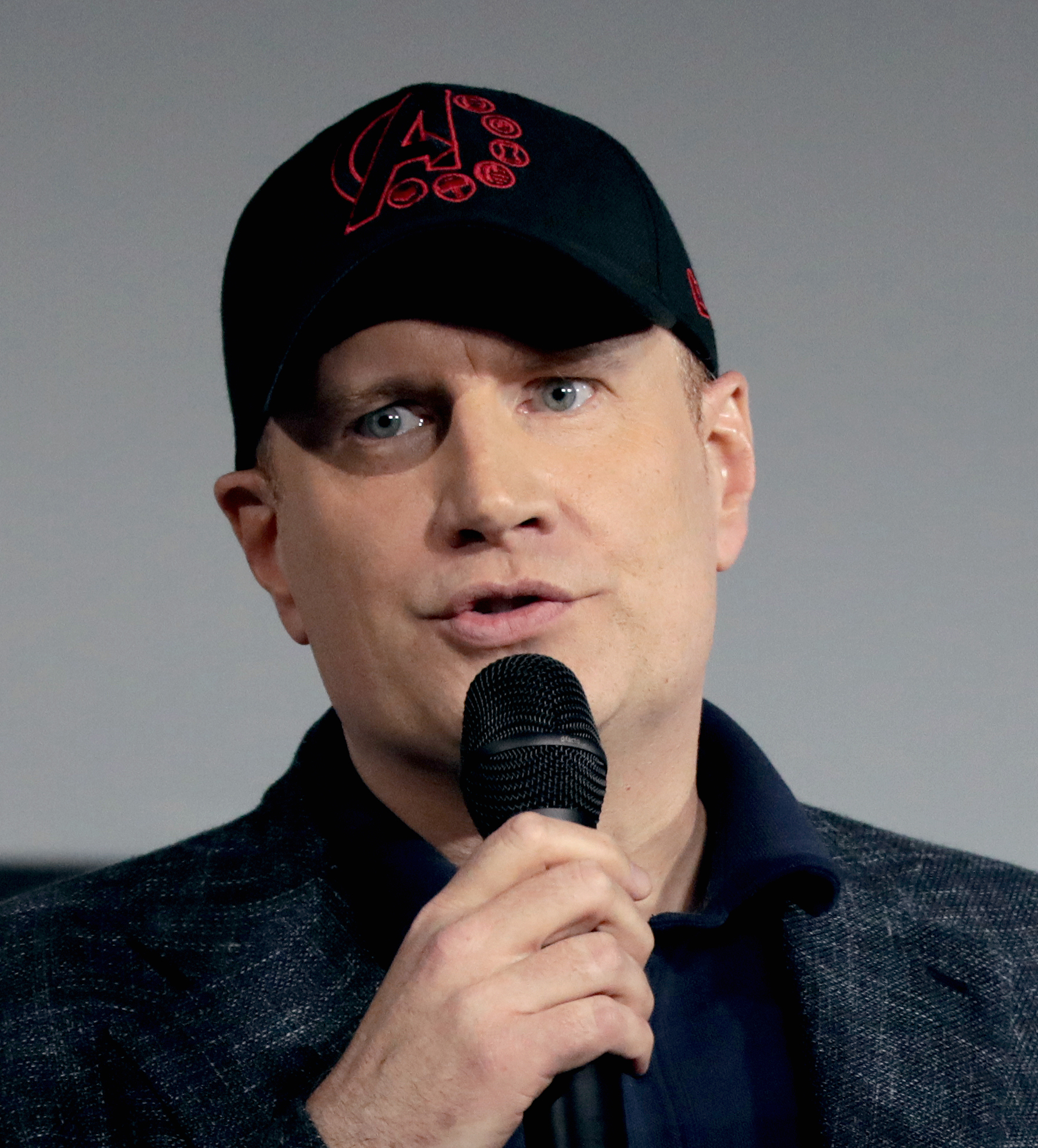
Producer Kevin Feige at the 2019 San Diego Comic-Con

The film was officially announced at the 2019 San Diego Comic-Con by Feige, Shortland, and members of the cast. They discussed the film and introduced footage from the first 30 days of production. Some of that footage was included in a teaser trailer for the film that was released in December, with several commentators highlighting its spy thriller tone and calling the film "long awaited" or "highly anticipated" by fans. Rachel Leishman of The Mary Sue said finally seeing a trailer for the film was "surprisingly emotional". She felt that setting it between Civil War and Infinity War would allow the character to grow into her more mature form from the latter film after earlier MCU films had depicted her in a supporting role to the male Avengers. Scott Mendelson of Forbes compared the trailer's story and tone to the films Atomic Blonde (2017), Red Sparrow (2018), and Anna (2019), but felt Black Widow had a commercial advantage over those films since it stars a familiar character. Mendelson thought this familiarity could outweigh the teaser's focus on "family melodrama" over superheroics, which he compared to Marvel Studios' Thor (2011). The Hollywood Reporter's Richard Newby found noticeable differences in Shortland's shot composition and cinematography in the trailer compared to the styles of Jon Favreau, Joss Whedon, and the Russo brothers, all directors who helped define Black Widow in previous MCU films, indicating a move away from the MCU's "house style".

What was intended to be the final trailer for the film debuted in March 2020. Nicole Carpenter of Polygon said it was the most in-depth look at the film yet with a more "intimate look" at the relationship between Romanoff and Belova. Josh Weiss of Syfy Wire enjoyed the trailer's quieter moments in addition to the expected action sequences. Mendelson found the trailer to be an improvement over the teaser, attributing this to its theme of "found families (the Avengers), forced families ([the Black Widows]) and actual family" portrayed by Pugh, Harbour, and Weisz.

Disney's president of marketing Asad Ayaz said that after Black Widow was delayed from its original May 2020 release date, the marketing team paused their campaign for the film. Once they began working towards a new release date in 2021, they were able to use character looks and story points they had not revealed in the initial campaign to build a new approach to the film. Ayaz explained that they did not want it to feel like they had returned to the same marketing campaign, which focused on the Black Widow symbol and her traditional black costume. The marketing team differentiated the new campaign by instead featuring the character's new white costume from the film, and by focusing on her legacy as an Avenger. The campaign featured 30 brands, including co-branded opportunities with GEICO, Ziploc, BMW, and Synchrony Bank. Additional custom partnerships occurred with Fandango, YouTube, Roku, TikTok, and Amazon, with a Twitter E3 gaming sponsorship as well as announcements, posters, and collectibles for premium theater experiences such as IMAX.

In September 2020, Barbie released two Black Widow dolls featuring Romanoff's black and white outfits from the film. Marvel released another trailer in April 2021, which Austen Goslin at Polygon described as a new "final" trailer for the film's new release date. He said it only had a few new scenes in it but provided the best look yet at the villain Taskmaster. Goslin highlighted the Russian-inspired version of The Avengers theme music used at the end of the trailer. Germain Lussier of io9 also highlighted the use of The Avengers theme, feeling that the music combined with footage from previous MCU films as well as flashback moments of Romanoff and her family made the trailer feel more epic than the previous "final" trailer. Lussier said it was a trailer that "gets you excited for the return" of MCU films after the pandemic delays. Ethan Anderton of /Film said the free-falling fight with Taskmaster showcased in the trailer "looks like a sequence unlike any other" in the MCU. The trailer received over 70 million views in its first 24 hours. On July 5, Moneymaker: Behind the Black Widow, a half-hour documentary special centered on Johansson's stunt double Heidi Moneymaker, premiered on ESPN+ as part of ESPN's E60 series. The special was directed by Martin Khodabakhshian and narrated by Johansson. A subsequent, eight-minute version of the special aired on ESPN's Outside the Lines on July 10. An episode of the series Marvel Studios: Legends was released on July 7, exploring Black Widow using footage from her previous MCU appearances.

== Release ==
=== Theatrical and Premier Access ===
Black Widow premiered on June 29, 2021, at various red carpet fan events in London, Los Angeles, Melbourne, and New York City. It was screened at the Taormina Film Fest on July 3, and was released in the United States on July 9, simultaneously in theaters and on Disney+ with Premier Access for US$30. It premiered in 46 territories over the course of its first weekend. In the U.S. it opened in 4,100 theaters, with 375 in IMAX, over 800 in premium large formats, 1,500 in 3D, and 275 in specialty D-Box, 4DX, and ScreenX theaters. In IMAX screenings, approximately 22 minutes of the film appeared in IMAX's expanded aspect ratio. Black Widow is the first film released in Phase Four of the MCU. Release dates for China, Taiwan, India, parts of Australia, and other Southeast Asia and Latin America markets were not set by the film's opening weekend, and by September the film was not expected to be released theatrically in China. Black Widow was the first of several MCU films to not receive a theatrical release in China, a "de facto ban" that was not lifted until 2023.

The film was originally scheduled for release on May 1, 2020. In early March 2020, after the COVID-19 pandemic had caused the closure of theaters in many countries, the release date for the film No Time to Die was shifted from April 2020 to November 2020. Commentators began speculating about the potential for other major films like Black Widow to be postponed as well. Deadline Hollywood reported on rumors in the film distribution industry suggesting that Black Widow would take the November release date of Marvel's Eternals, with the latter being delayed until 2021, but Disney said that it still intended to release Black Widow in May 2020. After a trailer was released for the film a week later, Scott Mendelson at Forbes said the trailer's existence and use of the May 2020 release date confirmed that the film was not being delayed. He said this was "the logical choice" because it was an ideal release date for the film and there was no evidence that the pandemic would affect its performance in the U.S. A week later, theaters across the U.S. were closed due to the pandemic and gatherings larger than 50 people were discouraged by the Centers for Disease Control and Prevention (CDC); Disney removed the film from its May release date. Adam B. Vary and Matt Donnelly at Variety questioned whether the MCU could be impacted more by pandemic delays than other franchises due to its interconnected nature. A Marvel Studios source told them that changing the film's release date would not affect the MCU timeline, and the pair speculated that this was due to the film being a prequel. In April, Disney gave Eternals's November 6, 2020, release date to Black Widow and shifted all other Phase Four films back in the release schedule to accommodate this.

Anthony D'Alessandro of Deadline Hollywood reported in September 2020 that Disney was considering rescheduling Black Widow again, with Variety also reporting this and attributing it to the low box office returns for Disney's Mulan in China and Warner Bros.' Tenet in North America. Later that month, Disney pushed the release to May 7, 2021, rescheduling Eternals and Shang-Chi and the Legend of the Ten Rings (2021) as a result. In January 2021, Feige said he still expected Black Widow to debut in theaters, but Variety reported that Disney was considering releasing the film on its streaming service Disney+. There was also potential to delay the film's release again, or release it concurrently in theaters and on Disney+ with Premier Access—as was done with Disney's Raya and the Last Dragon (2021)—if the effects of the pandemic did not improve leading up to May 2021. Variety felt it would be "insurmountably more challenging" for Black Widow to become profitable if it did not have a traditional theatrical release. In early February, Disney CEO Bob Chapek reaffirmed that Black Widow was intended to be solely released in theaters, but Disney was cognizant of theaters reopening, particularly in large cities such as New York and Los Angeles, as well as consumer desire to return to theaters. According to Variety, Feige was opposed to a hybrid release for the film. If the film was delayed again, the film distribution industry believed Disney would move it to July 9, 2021, which at that point was the release date for Shang-Chi. Chapek reiterated the next month that Disney planned to release Black Widow in theaters on May 7, while Deadline Hollywood again noted the possibilities of delaying the film, releasing it simultaneously on Disney+, or releasing it in theaters for a short time before making it available on Disney+. Chapek soon stated that Disney was remaining flexible as they gauged consumer behavior, and they would make a final decision at the "last minute".

In late March, Disney moved the film's release date to July 9, 2021, and announced that it would be released simultaneously in theaters and on Disney+ with Premier Access. Shang-Chi was delayed again as a result. Kareem Daniel, the chairman of Disney Media and Entertainment Distribution, said the simultaneous release gave fans options to see the film while serving the "evolving preferences of audiences". Chaim Gartenberg at The Verge opined that Disney had to move forward with a simultaneous release because they could not afford to delay Marvel's Phase Four television series, which were some of the few "high-profile, must-watch shows" on Disney+ and once they began with WandaVision in January 2021 there was only so long that the films could be delayed before the interconnected nature of Marvel's storytelling began causing issues. For instance, the series Hawkeye was expected to be released later in 2021 and contain spoilers for Black Widow, so the film needed to be released before then. Gartenberg said Disney and Marvel were victims of their own success, but felt the potential revenue loss from the simultaneous release could lead to long-term positives such as fans who otherwise would not have watched Marvel's series potentially discovering them when signing up for Disney+ to watch Black Widow.

==== Lawsuit ====
In July 2021, Johansson filed a lawsuit in Los Angeles County Superior Court against The Walt Disney Company, alleging that the simultaneous release of Black Widow in theaters and on Disney+ breached a stipulation in her contract that the film be released exclusively in theaters. The suit claimed that the simultaneous release exempted Disney from paying "very large box office bonuses" that Johansson would have been entitled to. According to The Wall Street Journal, Johansson had been concerned about the possibility of the film being released on Disney+ as early as prior to the release of Avengers: Endgame when Black Widow was still in development. Vulture contributor Chris Lee opined that not having any planned appearances in future MCU projects might have influenced Johansson's decision to move forward with filing the lawsuit. Disney issued a statement in response to the suit, saying it had "no merit whatsoever" and that Johansson had shown a "callous disregard for the horrific and prolonged global effects of the COVID-19 pandemic". The company claimed that they had fully complied with Johansson's contract and that the Disney+ Premier Access release of the film had "significantly enhanced [Johansson's] ability to earn additional compensation" beyond the $20 million she had already received for the film.

Bryan Lourd, Johansson's agent and co-chairman of Creative Artists Agency, condemned Disney's response as "shamelessly and falsely accus[ing] Ms. Johansson of being insensitive to the global COVID pandemic". He accused the company of "leaving artistic and financial partners" out of their streaming profits and denounced the disclosure of Johansson's $20 million earnings as "an attempt to weaponize her success as an artist and businesswoman, as if that were something she should be ashamed of". The advocacy organizations Women in Film, ReFrame, and Time's Up jointly denounced Disney's response, calling it a "gendered character attack" and saying they "stand firmly against Disney's recent statement which attempts to characterize Johansson as insensitive or selfish for defending her contractual business rights". TheWrap reported that Johansson was shocked by the tone of Disney's response, while Disney chairman and then-former CEO Bob Iger was allegedly mortified. Feige was reported to be angered and embarrassed by Disney's handling of the situation, and wanted the company to make it right with Johansson. SAG-AFTRA president Gabrielle Carteris also condemned Disney's response, saying they "should be ashamed of themselves for resorting to tired tactics such as gender-shaming and bullying". In response to these criticisms, Disney attorney Daniel Petrocelli called the suit a "highly orchestrated [public relations] campaign to achieve an outcome that is not obtainable in a lawsuit".

Eriq Gardner at The Hollywood Reporter believed Johansson's case was potentially weak since disputes of this kind usually take place in arbitration, and that she had been forced into presenting a claim of tortious interference rather than a standard contract breach due to a clause in her contract. Gardner added that Disney could defend not waiting for the market to recover from the pandemic since they had already delayed the film's release by a year and needed Black Widow to be released so they could continue the MCU, considering the film introduces important new characters such as Yelena Belova who was expected to appear in future MCU projects. Screen Daily editor Matt Mueller told BBC News that he expected the case would be resolved between Disney and Johansson before reaching court, and expressed surprise that Disney had let it get to this stage, given Warner Bros. had made agreements with stars for simultaneous releases in theaters and on HBO Max for films like Space Jam: A New Legacy (2021). Mueller also believed the case would prompt other studios with streaming services to look at what contractual steps they would need to prevent further legal action like this. Variety reported in July 2021 that the case had prompted other Disney actors to consider similar litigations.

In August 2021, Disney filed a motion to move the lawsuit to arbitration, citing that Black Widow had outgrossed other MCU films in its opening weekend with an "impressive pandemic-era showing". Johansson's attorney John Berlinski criticized this move as an attempt by Disney to "hide its misconduct in a confidential arbitration", while calling the company's initial response to the case misogynistic. The suit was settled a month later under undisclosed terms, though Deadline Hollywood reported that Johansson would receive over $40 million from Disney. The settlement came after Disney chose to give theatrical-only releases to subsequent 2021 films following the box office success of Shang-Chi and Free Guy (2021), which both received exclusive theatrical windows when initially released. In November 2021, Johansson said in regards to the lawsuit that she felt "very fortunate that nobody will have to go through what I went through" and thought the case had made "a positive impact in the industry and hopefully for artists and creatives' lives and livelihood[s]."

=== Home media ===
Black Widow was released by Walt Disney Studios Home Entertainment on digital download in the U.S. on August 10, 2021, and was released on Ultra HD Blu-ray, Blu-ray, and DVD on September 14. Deleted scenes, a gag reel, and behind-the-scenes featurettes were included. The film was made available to all Disney+ subscribers starting October 6. The IMAX Enhanced version of the film was made available on Disney+ on November 12.

== Reception ==
=== Box office ===
Black Widow grossed $183.7 million in the United States and Canada, and $196.1 million in other territories, for a worldwide total of $379.8 million. The film's opening weekend earned $226.2 million globally, which included $80.4 million at the domestic box office, $78.8 million at the international box office, and $67 million in Disney+ Premier Access global revenue. The opening weekend gross was within or had exceeded various pre-release projections. In June 2021, Fandango reported that the film had the most ticket presales in 2021, and surpassed other MCU films from previous years like Doctor Strange (2016) and Spider-Man: Homecoming (2017).

Black Widow earned $39.5 million on its opening day, including $13.2 million from Thursday night previews, which was the best preview night and opening day since the onset of the COVID-19 pandemic in March 2020. Its total weekend gross was $80.4 million, making it the top film of the weekend. This was the largest box office opening since the COVID-19 pandemic began, surpassing F9's opening of $70 million, and the largest opening weekend since Star Wars: The Rise of Skywalker (2019). The domestic gross was within some of the pre-release projections for the film, but it was below some updated industry projections that were made during the weekend after the opening night and preview grosses were known; Deadline Hollywood partially attributed this to the film's availability on Disney+ with Premier Access. When the $80.4 million theatrical gross was combined with the domestic Premier Access revenue of $55 million, totaling over $135.4 million for its opening weekend, Disney noted that Black Widow was the only film to surpass $100 million in domestic consumer spend on opening weekend since the start of the pandemic, and it marked the third largest opening ever for an MCU origin film behind Black Panther ($202 million) and Captain Marvel ($153.4 million). Following its opening weekend, Black Widow posted the largest non-holiday Monday ($7.16 million) and Tuesday ($7.6 million) gross in the pandemic. The film passed $100 million at the domestic box office in six days, the fastest to do so in the pandemic.

In its second weekend, the film grossed $25.8 million, finishing second behind Space Jam: A New Legacy. Its 67% drop marked the largest sophomore week decline for an MCU film, passing Ant-Man and the Wasp (62%). Box office analysts attributed Black Widow's second-week decline to its Disney+ Premier Access release, as well as widely reported piracies of the film online. In its third weekend, the film earned a further $11.6 million and became the fastest film to reach $150 million in total domestic box office gross in the pandemic. Black Widow was the fourth-highest-grossing film of 2021 in the United States and Canada.

Outside of North America, Black Widow earned $78.8 million in its opening weekend, from 46 markets. It was the number one film in nearly all of these markets, including the markets in the Asia Pacific region where it opened—excluding Japan, where it was third—and all markets in the Latin America region. Black Widow had the top pandemic opening weekend in 15 European markets. IMAX accounted for $4.8 million of the weekend gross, from 59 countries, 11 of which set opening weekend records for the pandemic. In South Korea, the film's opening day was the second-best of 2021, with $3.3 million, and Hong Kong had the best opening of the pandemic, with $3.2 million. The film had the largest opening day of the pandemic in Austria, the Czech Republic, Qatar, and Slovakia, while in Saudi Arabia, the film earned the highest opening day for a Disney release ever. It was the number one film on opening day in many other markets. As of October 2021, the top markets for the film outside of North America were South Korea ($26.3 million), the United Kingdom ($25.8 million), and France ($15.1 million).

=== Streaming viewership ===
With Disney+ Premier Access, Black Widow earned $67 million worldwide in its opening weekend. It was the first film that Disney revealed Premier Access revenue for, with the revenue skewing heavily towards the United States with $55 million. Analytics company Samba TV, which measures at least five minutes of viewership on smart televisions in over 3 million U.S. households, reported that 1.1 million households watched the film in its opening weekend. Deadline Hollywood noted that this viewership translated to about $33 million in revenue for Disney, considering the US$30 price of Premier Access, which lined up with the announced worldwide revenue. The site also stated that Disney was receiving about 85% of the Disney+ Premier revenue, sharing the rest with platform providers such as Amazon Firestick and Apple TV+. The following weekend, Deadline Hollywood reported that Black Widow had become the most-pirated film of the past week, while some industry sources believed it had become the most-pirated film of the pandemic.

Samba TV later updated the film's Disney+ Premier Access viewership, reporting that the film had been streamed over 2 million times in the U.S. over its first 10 days of release, which resulted in around $60 million in overall domestic revenue from Disney+. Samba TV also reported updates to 10-day viewership in the United Kingdom (258,000), Germany (116,000), and Australia (47,000). In October, Samba TV reported that over 1.1 million U.S. households had watched Black Widow in the first five days of its availability to all subscribers on Disney+. They also reported viewership in the United Kingdom (190,000) and Germany (96,000) during that same time frame. As of August 2021, Black Widow had earned $125 million through streaming and digital downloads. In its first 30 days, the film was watched in over 2.8 million U.S. households. Deadline Hollywood reported the film had been pirated over 20 million times, resulting in at least $600 million in lost revenue for Disney. Nielsen Media Research, which records streaming viewership on certain U.S. television screens, reported that Black Widow was the eleventh most-streamed film of 2021 with 4.410 billion minutes streamed. In January 2022, tech firm Akamai listed Black Widow as the third-most pirated film of 2021.

=== Critical response ===
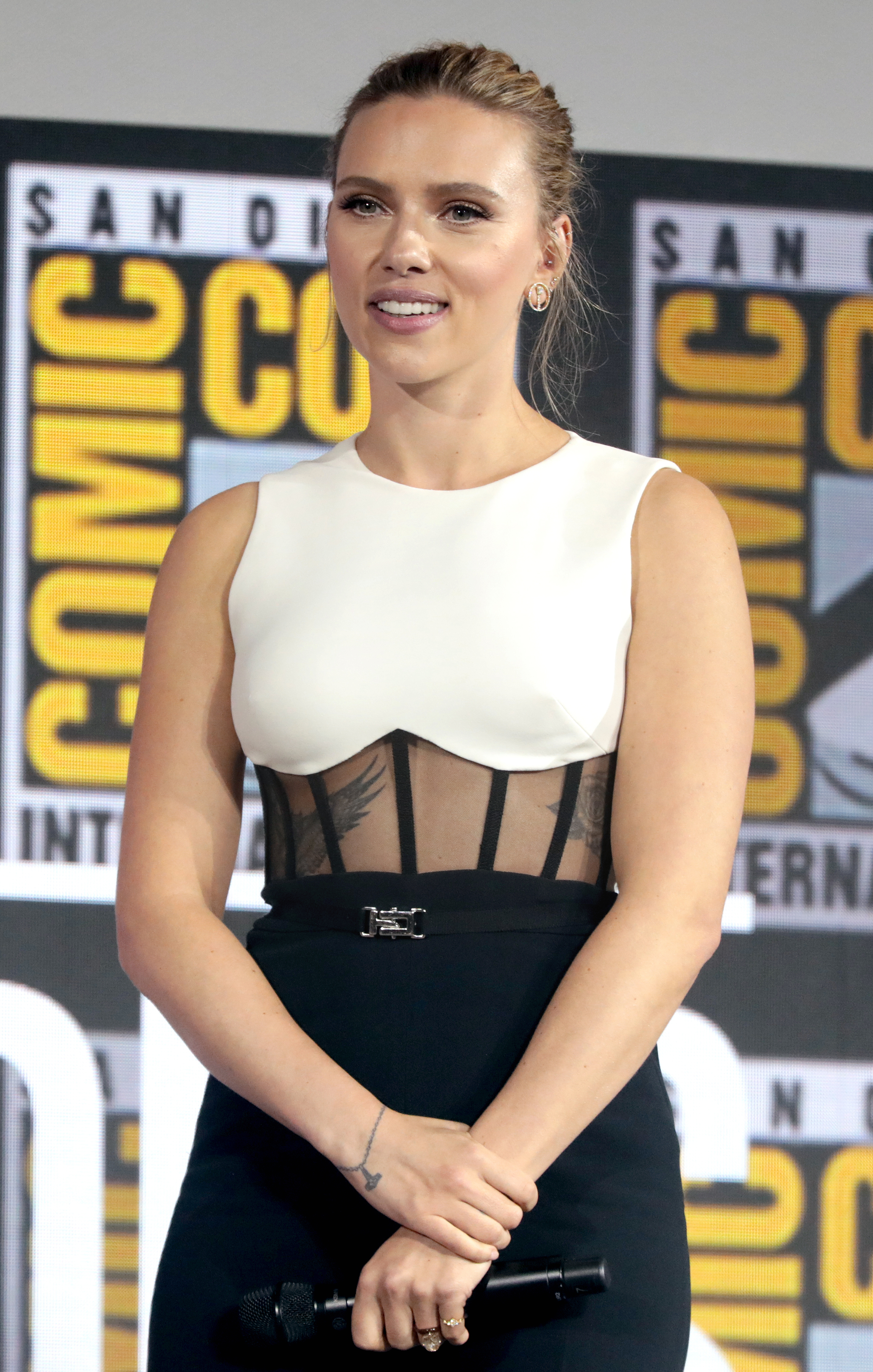
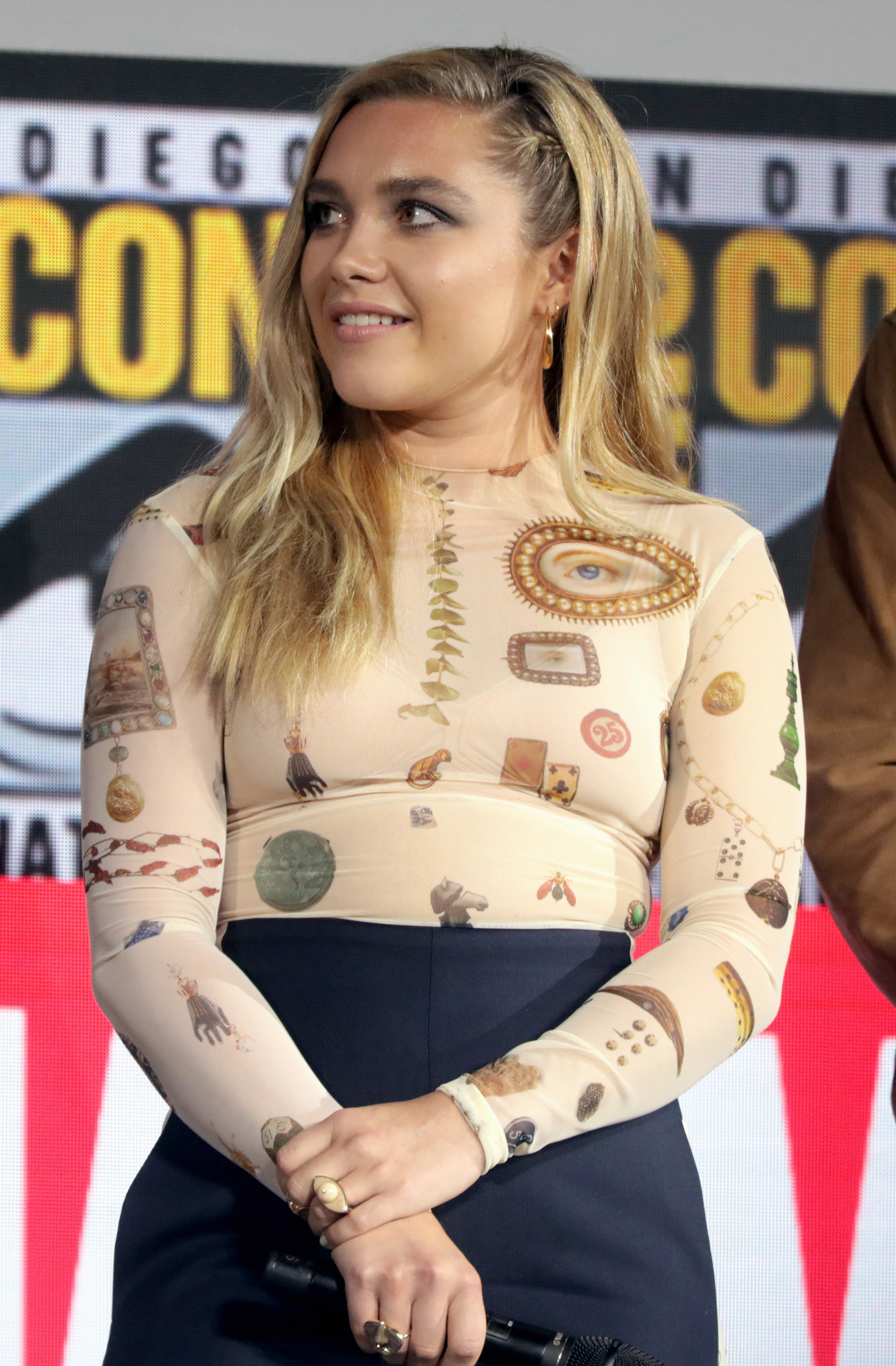
The performances of Scarlett Johansson (L) and Florence Pugh (R) were praised by critics.

The review aggregator Rotten Tomatoes reported an approval rating of 79%, with an average score of 7/10, based on 463 reviews. The website's critical consensus reads, "Black Widow's deeper themes are drowned out in all the action, but it remains a solidly entertaining standalone adventure that's rounded out by a stellar supporting cast." Metacritic, which uses a weighted average, assigned the film a score of 68 out of 100 based on reviews from 58 critics, indicating "generally favorable" reviews. Critics commonly praised the cast, particularly Johansson and Pugh, as well as the action sequences. Audiences polled by CinemaScore gave the film an average grade of "A−" on an A+ to F scale, while PostTrak reported that 88% of audience members gave it a positive score and 69% said they would definitely recommend the film.

Owen Gleiberman of Variety initially feared that Black Widow would just be two hours of Johansson fighting, but found the film to be more interesting than that despite still having fight sequences that would "give a mainstream audience that getting-your-money's-worth feeling". He praised Shortland's direction and said, "from the opening credits, most of it has a gritty, deliberate, zap-free tone that is strikingly—and intentionally—earthbound for a superhero fantasy". Writing for The Hollywood Reporter, David Rooney felt the film's move away from the superhero genre into a "high-octane espionage thriller" made it a more satisfying female-starring MCU film than the "blandly bombastic" Captain Marvel. At IGN, Nicole Clark discussed the ambition of the film to go beyond the superhero genre to explore the abuse and "intense tragedy" from Romanoff's past.

At The Hollywood Reporter, Rooney described the film as a "stellar vehicle" for Johansson and praised her vulnerability in the film, while Gleiberman said Johansson "holds the film together and gives it its touch of soul" with her vulnerability which he said was unusual for a superhero film performance. Several critics praised the film's supporting cast, with the chemistry between Johansson and Pugh in particular a highlight. Pete Hammond of Deadline Hollywood said "Natasha's awkward shyness [is] counterpunched by the lively and cynical Yelena", and praised Johansson's presence in her role. He felt Pugh was ready to lead her own franchise and also praised the performances of Weisz, Harbour, and Winstone. Leah Greenblatt of Entertainment Weekly said the relationship between Romanoff and Belova was the "real love story" of the film, and Nicole Clark felt the film was at its strongest in the scenes where the pair were fighting against or beside each other. Brian Tallerico of RogerEbert.com said Pugh was the film's MVP and had found "just the right shades of strength and vulnerability". Caryn James at the BBC also praised Pugh and said Belova was "more lived-in than most action-movie characters".

IndieWire's Eric Kohn gave the film a B grade, saying it delivered on action and praising the lower stakes. He positively compared the film's fight sequences to the Bourne franchise and said, "If this is the last time we get to see Johansson mete out justice to her assailants with gymnastic velocity, it's an apt send-off." Hammond of Deadline Hollywood agreed, writing that Johansson "goes out with all guns blazing as this [film...] does not stint one bit on the action". Gleiberman also compared the film to the Bourne franchise, while James compared it to the Mission: Impossible franchise and said it was "the least Avenger-like movie in the [MCU] so far". She gave the film four out of five stars, but did criticize the ending as being typical of the franchise. Writing for Vanity Fair, Richard Lawson praised Shortland's direction of the action sequences and the film's more grounded physics.

Despite calling the film stylish and fun, Joshua Rivera of Polygon said it came across as "hollow" and like an "apology" for Romanoff's death in Endgame. Similarly, Hoai-Tran Bui at /Film felt the film was "too little, too late" after the character's death, and Matt Goldberg at Collider felt the film wasted the chance to further explore the Budapest mission in Romanoff's past in favor of introducing Belova as a replacement Black Widow. Ann Hornaday at The Washington Post had similar thoughts, noting the set-up for Pugh to continue in the franchise and feeling the film did not make up for Johansson getting "short shrift" in earlier MCU installments.

=== Accolades ===
Black Widow was one of 28 films that received the ReFrame Stamp for 2021, awarded by the gender equity coalition ReFrame for films that are proven to have gender-balanced hiring.

Accolades received by Black Widow
Award	Date of ceremony	Category	Recipient(s)	Result	Ref(s)
Golden Trailer Awards	July 22, 2021	Best Fantasy Adventure	"Control" (MOCEAN)	Won	
Golden Trailer Awards	July 22, 2021	Best Summer 2021 Blockbuster Trailer	"Home" (Wild Card)	Nominated	
Golden Trailer Awards	July 22, 2021	Best Summer Blockbuster TV Spot (for a Feature Film)	"Choose" (Wild Card)	Won	
Golden Trailer Awards	July 22, 2021	Best Teaser Poster	"Teaser One-Sheet" (LA/Lindeman Associates)	Nominated	
Women's Image Network Awards	October 14, 2021	Outstanding Actress Feature Film	Scarlett Johansson	Nominated	
Women's Image Network Awards	October 14, 2021	Outstanding Feature Film	Black Widow	Won	
Hollywood Music in Media Awards	November 17, 2021	Score – SciFi/Fantasy Film	Lorne Balfe	Nominated	
Hollywood Professional Association Awards	November 18, 2021	Outstanding Visual Effects – Feature Film	David Hodgins, Hanzhi Tang, Ryan Duhaime, James Reid, Edmond Smith III (Digital Domain)	Won	
Hollywood Professional Association Awards	November 18, 2021	Outstanding Visual Effects – Feature Film	Sean Walker, Marvyn Young, Karl Rapley, Lily Lawrence, Timothy Walker (Weta Digital)	Nominated	
People's Choice Awards	December 7, 2021	Movie of 2021	Black Widow	Won	
People's Choice Awards	December 7, 2021	Action Movie of 2021	Black Widow	Nominated	
People's Choice Awards	December 7, 2021	Female Movie Star of 2021	Scarlett Johansson	Won	
People's Choice Awards	December 7, 2021	Female Movie Star of 2021	Florence Pugh	Nominated	
People's Choice Awards	December 7, 2021	Action Movie Star of 2021	Scarlett Johansson	Nominated	
People's Choice Awards	December 7, 2021	Action Movie Star of 2021	Florence Pugh	Nominated	
St. Louis Film Critics Association	December 19, 2021	Best Action Film	Black Widow	Nominated	
St. Louis Film Critics Association	December 19, 2021	Best Visual Effects	Black Widow	Nominated	
San Diego Film Critics Society	January 10, 2022	Best Comedic Performance	David Harbour	Runner-up	
Georgia Film Critics Association	January 14, 2022	Oglethorpe Award for Excellence in Georgia Cinema	Cate Shortland, Eric Pearson	Nominated	
Houston Film Critics Society	January 19, 2022	Best Stunt Coordination	Black Widow	Nominated	
Screen Actors Guild Awards	February 27, 2022	Outstanding Performance by a Stunt Ensemble in a Motion Picture	Black Widow	Nominated	
Hollywood Critics Association Film Awards	February 28, 2022	Best Stunts	Black Widow	Nominated	
Visual Effects Society	March 8, 2022	Outstanding Model in a Photoreal or Animated Project	"The Red Room" – Tristan John Connors, Bo Kwon, James Stuart, Ryan Duhaime	Nominated	
Visual Effects Society	March 8, 2022	Outstanding Compositing and Lighting in a Feature	"Red Room Crashing Back to Earth" – Michael Melchiorre, Simon Twine, Daniel Harkness, Tim Crowson	Nominated	
Critics' Choice Super Awards	March 17, 2022	Best Superhero Movie	Black Widow	Nominated	
Critics' Choice Super Awards	March 17, 2022	Best Actress in a Superhero Movie	Florence Pugh	Won	
Critics' Choice Super Awards	March 17, 2022	Best Actress in a Superhero Movie	Scarlett Johansson	Nominated	
Nickelodeon Kids' Choice Awards	April 9, 2022	Favorite Movie Actress	Scarlett Johansson	Nominated	
MTV Movie & TV Awards	June 5, 2022	Best Hero	Scarlett Johansson	Won	
MTV Movie & TV Awards	June 5, 2022	Best Fight	Black Widow vs. Widows	Nominated	

== Documentary special ==
In February 2021, the documentary series Marvel Studios: Assembled was announced. The specials go behind the scenes of the MCU films and television series with cast members and additional creatives. A special for this film, "The Making of Black Widow", featuring Johansson, was released on Disney+ on October 20, 2021.

== Future ==
Pugh reprised her role as Belova in the Disney+ series Hawkeye, continuing the storyline that is set up by the film's post-credits scene. In June 2021, Shortland expressed interest in directing another film in the MCU, and noted that a potential sequel to Black Widow would likely revolve around a different character following Romanoff's death. Weisz said she would be interested in a future storyline featuring Vostokoff assuming her Iron Maiden comic book persona.
