= O'Neill Collegiate and Vocational Institute =

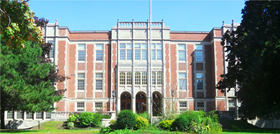

Location
- 301 Simcoe Street North; Oshawa, Ontario, L1G 4T2; Canada; 43.9058°N 78.8664°W

Information
- Motto: Let Talent Flourish
- Founded: 1909 (as Oshawa High School); 1930 (as Oshawa C.V.I.); 1959 (as O'Neill C.V.I.)
- School board: Durham District School Board
- Principal: Hoi Leung
- Grades: 9-12
- Enrolment: 1,310 (2019/2020)
- Language: English
- Area: Durham
- Colours: Red, green, and gold
- Mascot: Red Hawks
- Website: www.ddsb.ca/school/oneillcvi/

O'Neill Collegiate and Vocational Institute is located in Oshawa, Ontario, Canada, within the Durham District School Board. The school includes grades 9-12 and offers a wide range of academic and extracurricular activities. It is known as an art school, drawing many students from around the Greater Toronto Area into its arts programs. The science programs are well developed, with multiple fully functional science labs.

== Motto ==
The official motto of the school is "Let Talent Flourish", which is featured in many of the school's murals and artistic expressions, most notably a mural based on Vincent van Gogh's The Starry Night, featuring the motto, hidden in the position of the stars. The motto is also featured in the 'boys' foyer'.

== History ==
O'Neill CVI is the oldest secondary school in Oshawa, opened in its present location in 1909 as Oshawa High School. High school classes had been held in the Central Public School downtown for many year prior to this, so the school's roots go back well into the 19th century. The original building is still in the core of the school, but is not visible from outside.

After several major expansions during the 1920s, OHS became Oshawa Collegiate and Vocational Institute in 1930. In the post-war era, when Oshawa began building other high schools, OCVI was renamed O'Neill Collegiate and Vocational Institute after long-time principal, Albert O'Neill, who had led its expansion and transition to collegiate status. O'Neill celebrated its 75th anniversary (as OCVI, though it is actually much older if the OHS days are included) in 2005 with a mural in the library and a reunion of students and teachers.

== Academics ==
O'Neill is home to a Performing Arts program (PA), a Visual Arts program (VA), and a program for identified Gifted and Enriched students. PA and VA programs draw students from across Durham Region, and O'Neill was mentioned in the Toronto Star as a prestigious arts school in Southern Ontario. The Gifted program, however, only draws students from across Oshawa, as the other cities in Durham Region have their own Gifted schools. The Gifted and Enriched courses are offered from Grade 9 to Grade 11.

Due to O'Neill's large numbers of Gifted and Enriched students, it far surpassed the Durham District School Board's average on the EQAO testing, to be one of the top schools in the region.

== Library ==
The O'Neill CVI library has a lounge area with couches and chairs, study rooms, work desks, and books.

The library features a commemorative mural, created to celebrate the 75th anniversary of the school. It features the inukshuk sculpture that was originally outside the school in the back garden. This sculpture was dismantled by unknown perpetrators after school hours and was never rebuilt.

== Arts programs ==
O'Neill is known for its arts programs. The visual arts program is used to promote interest in visual-art based careers by introducing students to many forms of artistic media and allowing them to experiment and explore with various artistic ventures. The performing arts program is similar, but involves the study of performance-based art, (dance, drama, music, etc.) taught though the use of many public performances for both the community and the school.

=== Specialized visual arts program ===
Some art classes require students to participate in auditioning for the program which involves an interview and a letter from your former elementary school art or homeroom teacher. These normally involve specialized art styles or techniques, such as cartooning or photography.

=== Open studio ===
The visual arts department allows students to stay after school to work on art projects with the school's full roster of art supplies, or participate in various workshops, which can involve teaching by local experts on such subjects as fresco painting or wire sculpting.

=== Murals ===
There are many murals throughout the school, which are mostly created by students but occasionally by members of the art department. These include the war memorial mural in the memorial foyer, the dancers murals on the first floor, and the rainforest mural in the law hallway.

== Extracurricular activities ==
O'Neill offers many extracurricular activities, such as several choirs and bands; the School Reach team; sports teams in football, soccer, rugby, cross country, curling, basketball, volleyball, golf, STAR (Students Together Against Racism), the Spirit Committee, Eco Club, the Breakfast Club, the Robotics Club, the Leadership Club, DECA, and GSA (Gay-Straight Alliance).

== Notable alumni ==
- Wayne Cashman — NHL hockey player and member of Team Canada 1972 in the Summit Series versus the Soviet Union
- Tim Deegan — MuchMusic VJ
- Shalom Harlow — model and actress
- Kathryn Humphreys — former Citytv sports specialist
- Donald Jackson — Olympic figure skater
- Jessica Lord — actress
- Bobby Orr — attended his first part of grade 9 here before transferring to MCVI
- Nik Nanos — public opinion pollster
- Ryan O'Donnell — theoretical computer scientist and professor at Carnegie Mellon University
- Allan Pilkey — Ontario Minister of Correctional Services and Solicitor General (1991)
- Darrin Rose — stand-up actor and comedian on the CBC Television series, Mr. D

== Trivia ==
- A common joke played on freshmen is convincing them that there is a pool on the fourth floor. Though this is not true today, a pool was in the original plans for the school, but was never built due to cost.
- Craig Wildman is the longest serving teacher at O'Neill CVI, having taught from 1985 to 2017.

== See also ==
- Education in Ontario
- List of secondary schools in Ontario
