= List of Eve (British TV series) episodes =

Eve is a British children's science fiction series broadcast on CBBC that ran for three series. Series 1 of 13 episodes aired from 5 January to 11 April 2015; the episodes were broadcast on Mondays, with a double-episode finale on 23 March 2015, which was later separated into two episodes broadcast on Saturdays from 4 to 11 April 2015. A Christmas special was broadcast on Friday 25 December 2015 at 2:50 p.m. Series 2 of 12 episodes aired on Mondays from 4 January to 21 March 2016. Series 3 of 9 episodes aired on Wednesdays at 4:30 p.m., with its first two episodes premiered on 26 October 2016 and the rest ran until 14 December 2016.

== Series overview ==
Series	Episodes	Originally released	
Series	Episodes	First released	Last released
1	13	5 January 2015	11 April 2015
2	12	4 January 2016	21 March 2016
3	9	26 October 2016	14 December 2016
Special		25 December 2015	

== Episodes ==
=== Series 1 (2015) ===
No. overall	No. in season	Title	Directed by	Written by	Original release date
1	1	"All About Eve"	Adrian McDowall	Emma Reeves	5 January 2015
Life changes beyond recognition for the Clarke family when Eve, the world's first fully sentient "artificial person", comes to live under their roof. Eve is the first of her kind and, on the surface, she seems perfectly human. But scratch beneath that surface and you find a robot capable of amazing feats—if she manages to navigate her way through the perils of teenage life first. When maverick scientist Mary Douglas is thrown out of her own scientific institute, Calimov Systems, she orders Nick Clarke to destroy her top secret "Project Eternity" prototype Eve. But just as he is about to disconnect Eve, Nick is stopped by his teenage son Will. Will reconnects Eve, bringing her to life. He persuades his dad to take her back to their home, where they will need to keep Eve's existence a secret to protect her. But hiding Eve proves harder than expected. It will take all the ingenuity of Eve, Will and his best friend Lily to sort things out. Meanwhile, at Calimov Systems, Katherine Calvin is desperately trying to unlock the mystery of Project Eternity. First appearance: Poppy Lee Friar as Eve, Oliver Woollford as Will Clarke, Eubha Akilade as Lily Watson, Ben Cartwright as Nick Clarke, Rhona Croker as Katherine Calvin, Elijah Ayite as Abe Watson, Jane Asher as Mary Douglas, Shonagh Price as Maddy Watson, Richie Campbell as Viv Watson and David Ireland as Mr Bevan.
2	2	"A Real Girl"	Adrian McDowall	Emma Reeves	12 January 2015
Eve is the world's first fully sentient "artificial person". She seems human, but under the surface she is a robot capable of amazing feats—if she can navigate her way through the perils of teenage life first. Eve struggles to fit in with the outside world. Will and Lily try to help, but driven by her protocols, Eve has her own ideas. Nick's boss Katherine is on the trail of Project Eternity, but does she realise Eve's secret? Lily's brother Abe takes Eve shopping, and she meets a wannabe girl gang, the GP2s, and tries to join by dressing and dancing like them—she even graffitis their tag and "jacks" Lily's mum Maddy's car. But what is Protocol Zero, and who is Eve communicating with in private?
3	3	"Beautiful Game"	Adrian McDowall	Emma Reeves	19 January 2015
Will reluctantly has to explain the differences between boys and girls to a surprised Eve, and discovers that his robot friend has a hidden talent for goalkeeping. Will begs her to play for his failing team, but Eve wants to win, whatever the cost. Lily uncovers a mysterious Wi-Fi signal, but Eve insists it is not coming from her. Meanwhile, the cleaning spiderbot Nick has brought home from his work at Calimov has become sentient and goes out of control. Lily finds a connection between Eve and an attempt to hack into the systems of a local nuclear power station controlled by Calimov. First appearance: Rory Barraclough as Chris.
4	4	"The Bubble Bursts"	Adrian Mead	Emma Reeves	26 January 2015
Abe puts his feet up while Eve does his after-school deliveries. But when Eve goes into overdrive saving the planet, life gets dangerous.
5	5	"Brain Freeze"	Adrian McDowall	Andrew Yerlett	2 February 2015
Eve is desperate to try ice cream for the first time after Abe gets "brain freeze" from a Goliath sundae. Nick absolutely forbids Eve to eat or drink, so she builds herself an ice cream machine. Nick wants to find out more about Project Eternity and discovers that the military are hunting for a missing computer chip. He realises that Mary put it inside Eve, so he bans her from leaving the house. When Nick finds out that the military chip will explode if exposed to very cold temperatures there is a desperate rush to stop Eve trying the ice cream she craves. First appearance: Billy Ashworth as Zac.
6	6	"Things That Go Beep in the Night"	Adrian McDowall	Emma Reeves	9 February 2015
Will wants to take Eve to a Halloween party, but Nick forbids it. And when Nick discovers that his boss Katherine has found a way to track down the location of the military chip inside Eve, a desperate diversion is needed. Meanwhile, at the party, Eve is chatting to good-looking boy, Zac. But is there more to Zac than first appearances suggest? Will decides to shut Eve down and try to throw Zac off the scent. But it appears that Eve has formed an emotional attachment.
7	7	"The X & Y Factor"	Adrian Mead	Joe Williams	16 February 2015
Katherine suspects that Nick knows more about Project Eternity than he is letting on and dispatches Zac to flirt with Eve and gather information about Nick's secret work. Zac invites Eve out on a date to a karaoke cafe, but Eve's singing voice sounds like a computer modem. When Will discovers that Zac works for Katherine, he and Lily must race to the cafe before Eve's secret is out.
8	8	"The Truth About Lies"	Adrian Mead	Ann Marie Di Mambro	23 February 2015
Struggling to work out how to keep love-struck Eve away from Katherine's spy Zac, Will and Lily send her to hang out with Abe while they think up a plan. Abe is up to no good making dodgy fizzy drinks, so Eve quickly learns a thing or two about lying. Back at Will's house, Lily has an idea to protect Eve by getting Zac fired. Will calls Katherine pretending to be a German doctor looking for Zac and information about Calimov's secrets.
9	9	"Trashed"	Adrian Mead	Vivien Adam	2 March 2015
Abe's tablet goes haywire—and then, apparently, so does Eve, who seems to have forgotten that she is a robot and that she ever knew Zac. But when Eve sees Lily's parents Maddy and Viv together, she begins to remember fragmentary flashes of Zac. Determined to fill in the blanks, Eve asks Maddy to drive her to Calimov, where Zac worked, so she can understand who he was and why he is no longer in her life. Will and Lily work out that Eve used Abe's clean-up software to delete her own memory.
10	10	"Mum's the Word"	Jonathan Fox Bassett	Ann Marie Di Mambro	9 March 2015
It is Lily's birthday, and Eve is intrigued by the wish Lily makes when she blows out her candles. Eve wants to try it out for herself and "wishes" to meet her mother. This technically comes true when Mary appears in the form of a hologram before her, revealing to Eve that she is nearby, hiding in the woods. Eve tells Will, but he dismisses her "wish" as a daydream. While Lily and Will discuss Eve's "dream", Abe is eavesdropping in a bedroom cupboard. Abe understands that information about Mary's whereabouts pays well at Calimov. So, he anonymously calls Katherine with a tip-off that Mary is in the woods.
11	11	"IT Girl"	Jonathan Fox Bassett	Kirstie Swain	16 March 2015
Lily returns from school upset because she was disqualified from the science fair competition as Will, her partner, did not show up. Will barely apologizes—Lily could have gone with someone else. But Lily does not have any other friends. Lily has a brainwave and asks Eve, who has become a daytime TV addict, to come to school with her. At Calimov, Nick is banned from the research room where Katherine is trying to piece together burnt documents and photos recovered from Mary's cabin in the woods. Nick manages to get a sneak peek and realises that very soon the pieced-together jigsaw is going to reveal Eve as a robot. Nick needs to come up with a plan quickly.
12	12	"The Robot Next Door (Control, Alter, Delete Part 1)"	Jonathan Fox Bassett	Emma Reeves	4 April 2015
Will, Lily and Abe try to help Eve cope after she is devastated by the news that her "mother" Mary is dead. Eve receives a hologram message that Mary had prerecorded, which gives her instructions about where to hide if she and her friends are ever in trouble. But, for now, Eve and Will do not want to leave their lives behind. In trying to silence Mr Bevan, who now knows Eve's secret, the gang inadvertently gives him more solid evidence. He threatens to tell the truth to the whole school. To keep Bevan quiet, Eve solves a famous maths problem and offers to give him the credit. Delighted, Bevan agrees. At Calimov, Katherine traps Nick into confessing his involvement with Project Eternity to save a colleague—and then tricks him into revealing the location of the secret lab. With the clock ticking, Nick, Eve and Will plan to run away. As Katherine closes in, a heroic Abe buys time for his friends. Note: This episode and "Eternity" originally aired on 23 March 2015 as a double episode titled "Control, Alter, Delete", but both were later released as separate episodes.
13	13	"Eternity (Control, Alter, Delete Part 2)"	Jonathan Fox Bassett	Emma Reeves	11 April 2015
Will and Nick are caught by Katherine's minions and escorted to Calimov. Lily and Abe realise it is up to them to save the day. Lily hacks into Calimov's systems, but someone is there before her. At Calimov, Katherine offers Nick a choice: help her build an army of killer robots, or she will take Eve apart. Guest: Steven Tonge as Adam. Final appearance: David Ireland as Mr Bevan.

=== Christmas special (2015) ===
No. overall	No. in season	Title	Directed by	Written by	Original release date
14	1	"Christmas Eve"	Adrian McDowall	Emma Reeves	25 December 2015
It is Eve's first Christmas and after finding a way to connect to her mother, she has a million questions in her mind. She contacts Mary Douglas, but instead of answers, she contracts a software virus which activates her latent ability to dream. When Will finds Eve in an unresponsive state, he works tirelessly with Nick, Lily and Katherine to figure out what is wrong with her. They get a window into Eve's dream state, but Eve's brain was not wired to cope with imaginative visions and it is behaving weirdly. The software virus sends Eve into a cheerless parallel world, and as Eve cannot distinguish between reality and dream, her systems start to shut down. Can Will and the gang save Eve from her Christmas nightmare? And can Abe escape his own nightmare—being "Santa's little helper", dressed as a Christmas elf?

=== Series 2 (2016) ===
No. overall	No. in season	Title	Directed by	Written by	Original release date
15	1	"Do Not Build Them"	Adrian McDowall	Emma Reeves	4 January 2016
Calimov has attracted the attention of an anti-artificial intelligence group called PRICE. Under pressure, Katherine promises Calimov's board representative, Mr Gwenlan, something extraordinary and plans to reveal the truth about Eve. But with the help of some old friends, Eve upsets Katherine's plans. When a Calimov drone is sabotaged, this is the last straw for the board. Katherine and Nick get fired. Eve and Will suspect that Mary is behind the sabotage. But Nick cannot stop Mary attacking Eve's systems without access to his Calimov lab. So Eve has to go back into Calimov and pretend to work, right under Mr Gwenlan's nose. First appearance: Peter Collins as Mr Gwenlan and Michael Wildman as Lord Hoffman.
16	2	"Truth or Dare"	Adrian McDowall	Vivien Adam	11 January 2016
An ordinary day in Green Park begins with Eve helping Will to cheat on his homework and Abe teaching Eve the importance of "dares". But then Will's mum Rebecca arrives from Dubai. Nick is adamant that Rebecca must not learn the truth about Eve. Will is upset that his dad does not trust his mum. Meanwhile, Zac returns from Cuba determined to win Eve back. Eve is initially uncertain that she wants to be won back. Zac goes all out to prove his good intentions, but as Eve starts to think more positively about Zac, her body seems to protect her from her feelings and drives her away from Zac. At dinner with his mum, Will asks tough questions about her disappearance from his life and realises why Rebecca has come back. They get interrupted when Will spots Mr Gwenlan—who is supposed to be in prison. Mr Gwenlan chases after Will and finally corners him. First appearance: Jenny Bede as Rebecca Clarke. Returned: Billy Ashworth as Zac.
17	3	"The Mark of Cain"	Adrian McDowall	John Phelps & Gary Lawson	18 January 2016
With Mr Gwenlan on the loose, Katherine wants Eve to be locked up at Calimov. Eve and Nick talk her out of it as long as Eve stays out of trouble. Yet when Eve offers to babysit Zoe, Lily's tearaway cousin, staying out of trouble seems wholly unlikely. To understand the behaviour of "small humans", Eve lets Zoe run riot in the local park. When Katherine realises that Mr Gwenlan stole a spiderbot from Calimov, she is determined that Eve be kept under lock and key. Meanwhile Will and Lily start getting followed around everywhere by a strange boy called Cain. And when him and Lily start bonding, Will starts becoming a little jealous. First appearance: Chris Hegarty as Cain.
18	4	"Party Girl"	Adrian McDowall	Holly Phillips	25 January 2016
Eve feels compelled to try out a youth group called Party and drags her friends along to its lakeside activities. Eve loves Party, and its youth leader is impressed by Eve's attitude to technology. But when Eve becomes obsessed with the idea of canoeing on the lake, Will starts to get really nervous. Nick and Zac have worries of their own and attempt to listen into Mr Gwenlan's phone calls. When Mr Gwenlan turns out to be Party's co-founder and appears at the youth club, Will marches Eve home. Will cannot understand why Eve's protocols are not responding to danger and has strong words with Eve, but she storms off. Will, Lily and Zac reach the lakeside in time to find the youth group encouraging Eve to cross the lake on a rickety raft. If Eve falls in, it will be the end of her. To make matters worse, Will cannot swim but dives in to try and save Eve anyway.
19	5	"Power Games"	Lynsey Miller	Sergio Casci	1 February 2016
Abe introduces Eve to "basic sales techniques" getting her to help him sell mobile phones in the park. Once Eve gives the mobiles a turbo boost they start to sell like hot cakes. Abe is delighted until Eve sells a phone to Isaac, a young wheelchair user, for double the price. For Abe, a business line has been crossed—he even ends up paying Isaac to get the phone back. In another part of the business world, to protect Calimov from Price, Katherine has designed a new security system called Quincy. But when Quincy fails to stop a hack, Eve's secret is at risk. Eve herself is busy in the park teaching some manners to a gang of older boys, which leads Isaac to discovering something different about Eve.
20	6	"The Eve of Destruction"	Lynsey Miller	Joe Lidster	8 February 2016
Eve is infuriated by PARTY's anti-technology messages, she apparently causes a series of strange electrical surges and Abe gets a huge shock. Nick cannot detect any outside interference, so Eve concludes that for her friends' safety, she must be deactivated. Will and Lily see a connection between Eve going haywire and PRICE attempting to hack into Calimov two days earlier. While Lily stalls Mr Gwenlan at a PARTY event, Will goes to his house but cannot get inside. Will's call for help reactivates Eve who races out to help him. Inside Mr Gwenlan's house, Eve and Will discover more about what PRICE knows. But when Mr Gwenlan arrives home and intends to call the police, it is what Will knows that stops Mr Gwenlan in his tracks. Abe leaves hospital and is happy to forgive Eve in exchange for a new pair of trainers. Nick still cannot believe that Eve caused the electric shock. And when Eve intercepts a communication between Mary and someone else—the source of the malfunction finally becomes clear.
21	7	"A Case of Identity"	Lynsey Miller	Ann Marie Di Mambro	15 February 2016
Eve investigates the identity of Adam by channeling the methods of the great Sherlock Holmes. First Eve turns her attention to Isaac. Then Eve considers if it is Cain. Lily inspects and is shocked to discover the truth about Cain and his family. When Eve develops her intuition using Sherlock's method she overloads her system. Zac suggests that she would be better off using her own processes and Eve realises that her tests have been flawed and that Mary could have built Adam to better pass for a human. Perhaps Adam can eat or even breathe? Meanwhile, Nick and Katherine attempt to discover the robot's identity by tricking Mary into revealing Adam's location. However Mary turns the tables, leaving them back at square one.
22	8	"All About Adam"	Lynsey Miller	Emma Reeves	22 February 2016
Faced with Zac, his identical clone Adam and no way of reliably working out who is who—even Eve is confused! The gang lock the robot and the human in the cellar while Eve runs to Calimov for help. One of the lookalikes breaks out and catches up with Eve, claiming he is Zac and that Katherine has captured Mary. Eve knows who she is dealing with and tries to make Adam accept that he is not Zac. But Eve's plan backfires when Mary orders Adam to bring Eve to her.
23	9	"Giving Up the Ghost"	Adrian Mead	Mark Stevenson	29 February 2016
Eve is devastated by Adam being irreparably damaged. To cheer her up, Abe suggests a ghost hunt! Will and Lily think he is crazy, but Eve is fascinated by the idea of ghosts—and the possibility that Adam might have one. Meanwhile, Katherine and Gwenlan concoct a plan to build giant EMP devices and remove the threat of Mary once and for all. But Nick is furious about the danger this poses to Eve and resigns from Calimov. Eve sets about finding a ghost and her behaviour becomes increasingly odd. But Eve is not the only one acting peculiarly as Abe seems intent to make everything in the house as scary as possible.
24	10	"Fair Cop"	Adrian Mead	James Moran	7 March 2016
When Lily is arrested for hacking Lord Hoffman's computer, Will and Eve are desperate to save her. But Nick and Katherine cannot help them as they concentrate on getting their new robot working in time for a major presentation. Inspired by her favourite robot film, Eve breaks into the police station, analyses the evidence against Lily and concludes that Lily has been set up. Will and Lily contact Mary, who believes Lord Hoffman is behind the arrest and offers to destroy the evidence against Lily—if Will and Eve destroy Katherine's new robot. First appearance: Ellie Grainger as KT.
25	11	"Her Sister's Keeper"	Adrian Mead	Joe Williams	14 March 2016
With Will's assistance, Katherine's new robot KT comes to life.
26	12	"A Change in the World"	Adrian Mead	Emma Reeves	21 March 2016
Eve tries to return KT by offering herself to Mary but Mary reveals that it is Will that she wants. Final appearance: Peter Collins as Mr Gwenlan. Death of: Michael Wildman as Lord Hoffman and Jane Asher as Mary Douglas (human body).

=== Series 3 (2016) ===
No. overall	No. in season	Title	Directed by	Written by	Original release date
27	1	"Children of Eve"	Adrian McDowall	Emma Reeves	26 October 2016
Eve's attempts to help her sister KT pass for human are derailed when a miraculously recovered Katherine returns to Calimov. To Nick and Eve's horror, Katherine reveals her new range of childbots, which have been placed with local families. To prevent Katherine restoring KT to factory settings, Eve smuggles her out of Calimov and back to the Clarke house. But with Will and Lily insisting KT is returned to Calimov, Eve and her sister are forced to take matters into their own hands. The situation escalates when Katherine's childbots start to malfunction and it is KT who comes under suspicion, admitting she has no wish to pass as human. In order to make Eve prove she loves her sister as she is, KT wants Eve to reveal her own robot identity to the world. Trapped inside the house by the childbots, and with police and reporters gathering outside, the gang's worst fears have been realised. With Eve about to admit her secret to the world on live TV, can Will's nanobots save the day?
28	2	"New Born"	Adrian McDowall	Ann Marie Di Mambro	26 October 2016
Rebecca and Nick are desperate to get to the bottom of Will's nanobot problem, so they take him into Calimov to run some tests. Whilst there, Nick insists that Katherine deactivate KT after the trouble she has caused, but Katherine has other ideas. Meanwhile Abe is disgruntled after Lily refuses to help him with his homework—she is more interested in her date with Cain. Maddy has her hands full preparing for the arrival of the new baby and tells Abe that it is time he grew up and took some responsibility for himself. A dejected Abe goes to Eve for help. As Eve completes his homework, Abe wonders aloud what is so special about babies—why do they get everyone's attention? After researching human child-rearing, Eve cites "helplessness" as the main reason. Inspired, a scheming Abe fakes being ill to regain Maddy's attention, but his plan backfires. Suspecting Abe has appendicitis a concerned Maddy calls an ambulance! Once again Abe begs Eve for help and so Eve hacks the local traffic control system, gridlocking the roads and preventing the emergency services from getting through. The situation escalates when Maddy unexpectedly goes into labour. With the roads blocked, Abe must man-up and help his mum—while Eve goes for help. Across town Will crashes Lily's date revealing that Cain is a fully paid up member of anti-tech group PRICE. At Calimov, under Katherine's interrogation, KT reveals how Will ended the childbot siege using his nanobots. Katherine now has the leverage she needs to persuade Nick to keep KT online. At the Watsons', Eve and the gang return with help—to find Abe has successfully delivered his baby brother!
29	3	"Infinity, Plus One"	Adrian McDowall	James Moran	2 November 2016
For the umpteenth time, Eve defeats her friends at gaming, singing a football chant in triumph. Eve explains how, in a matter of nanoseconds, her predictive software allows her to always choose the best possible course of action—hence the winning streak. But it cannot predict random events like lottery numbers, much to Abe's disappointment. Unknown to the gang, Cain waits outside with Michael Hoffman, the son of the late Lord Hoffman. In their attempts to find rogue robots, Cain pitches his theory that—given the multiple incidents involving robot activity at the Clarke house, plus Nick's prior history with Mary Douglas—this is a good place to start. When the doorbell rings, Eve answers to find Cain and Michael. Detecting their concealed EMPs, she slams the door on them. Spooked by this odd behaviour they break in, fearful that there may be another robot siege in progress. Once inside they learn that Eve is the robot and blast her with their EMPs—only for time to rewind. This has simply been a simulation in Eve's predictive software! Eve runs multiple simulations, trying to find a way to stop Cain and Michael discovering her robot nature, but in each one her identity is exposed, and Cain and Michael destroy her. With time running out, Eve recruits the Will and Lily simulations. Lily speculates that Eve is experiencing anxiety—she has become so human that it has caused her predictive software to malfunction. Eve must disable the software and go it alone. Although Eve manages to evade discovery, neither she nor the gang realise that, while inside, Cain has bugged Nick's computer and is one step closer to the truth.
30	4	"Possession"	Adriam McDowall	Vivien Adam	9 November 2016
Mary resorts to extreme measures to head off the threat of Cain and PRICE, enlisting KT to help her temporarily transfer her consciousness to Eve. With KT AWOL from Calimov, a distracted Nick and Katherine welcome back Zac, who is helping them answer questions about how Mary was able to duplicate his personality. Excited about Zac's return, Eve suggests he join the gang's picnic that afternoon. To everyone's surprise Zac brings his new girlfriend, and for the first time Eve experiences jealousy. Spotting KT hovering nearby puts Eve on high alert. Operating under Protocol Zero, KT is Mary's automaton, and is primed to execute her mother's plan. Meanwhile, on Abe's misguided advice, Eve kisses Will in an attempt to make Zac jealous. For a moment, in robot communion, Will sees inside Eve's mind and then passes out. In the ensuing chaos, KT places a magnetic patch containing Mary's consciousness onto Eve. Inhabiting Eve's robot body, Mary begins to question Cain about PRICE. Separately, a revived Will tells Lily that when he kissed Eve he could see inside her systems. They theorise that this made her malfunction and fixate on the idea of jealousy—perhaps she is attempting to make Zac jealous by paying Cain so much attention? Little do they realise the truth. Later, Eve—still possessed by Mary—meets Cain in the park, where she interrogates him about PRICE's super-EMP. Mary decides that Cain must be terminated. Will intervenes in the nick of time, kissing Eve again. The disruption to her circuits forces Mary to relinquish control, but Will hears Mary's voice in Eve's mind. The gang are left with a burning question—could Mary be alive? Meanwhile at Calimov, unbeknownst to Nick, Katherine is using nanobots to heal. Guest: Billy Ashworth as Zac.
31	5	"Invasion"	Jonathan Fox Bassett	Michael Bhim	16 November 2016
Having been unknowingly possessed by Mary, Eve is on high alert. Matters are made worse by the fact that her memories of recent events are corrupted. Could Eve's actions be down to a sleeper virus, or—as Will suggests—has Mary found some way to cheat death? Eve's investigation is put on hold when Abe embroils her in a family drama. The Watsons have been invaded by their crotchety grandma Gloria, who is irate having discovered Abe's online competition to name his newborn brother. Eve witnesses the Watsons' meltdown as Gloria reveals that she never approved of Maddie and Viv's marriage.
32	6	"The P.R.I.C.E. of War"	Jonathan Fox Bassett	Mark Stevenson	23 November 2016
The discovery that Mary has cheated death throws the gang into chaos. If Mary were to take control of Eve permanently, she would be unstoppable. Sending KT as bait, Mary lures Eve to a secret bunker beneath Calimov. Will and Lily are horrified to discover that Mary has built herself a body out of the reclaimed childbots. Mary wants Will to bring her inanimate body to life! The ultimatum for Will: do as Mary demands or risk Mary deleting Eve and KT's memories. Unable to bear the thought of losing his friend, Will ignores Lily's pleas and uses his nanobots to force Mary's disembodied consciousness into her robot body. Resurrection of: Jane Asher as Mary Douglas. Death of: Chris Hegarty as Cain.
33	7	"The P.R.I.C.E. of Life"	Jonathan Fox Bassett	Emma Reeves	30 November 2016
Will and Lily are not speaking. Worse still, Will is suffering adverse side effects from protecting his friends from the rogue KT. Nick, fearing that he might not find a way to repair Will's nanobots, puts Eve on the spot, asking her if she can find Mary. Knowing the danger Mary poses, Eve lies—and tracks her mother down in secret. Meanwhile, cajoled by Abe, Lily finally softens and visits Will just as he takes a turn for the worse. Guest: Billy Ashworth as Adam and Poppy Lee Friar as Young Mary Douglas & Helen Douglas.
34	8	"Meet Your Maker"	Jonathan Fox Bassett	Kim Miller	7 December 2016
The Clarke household is in crisis. Will's nanobots are rapidly failing, and Nick is at a loss. Determined to save his son, Nick lays aside his initial suspicions when Katherine appears with a hi-tech solution. Will comes round and, despite a nano-hangover, seems well. But, as Nick knows, he is not out of danger yet—Katherine has supplied only a temporary fix. Heeding Nick's warning, Eve tracks down Peterson with Abe in tow, and Abe finds out what happened to Rebecca. First appearance: Steve Furst as Benjamin Peterson.
35	9	"Goodbye Forever, Again"	Fraser McDonald	Emma Reeves	14 December 2016
When Eve tries to prevent a war between humans and robots, Will struggles to control his nanobots and his feelings for Lily, Whiles Mary plots her revenge. Death of: Steve Furst as Benjamin Peterson and Jane Asher as Mary Douglas (robot body). Guest: Poppy Lee Friar as Helen Douglas. Note: Originally broadcast as a double-length episode, and split into two parts when it was repeated on 21 and 22 January 2017.
