= List of Coronation Street characters introduced in 2018 =

Coronation Street is a British soap opera first broadcast on 9 December 1960. The following is a list of characters introduced in 2018, by order of first appearance. All characters are introduced by series producer Kate Oates or her successor, Iain MacLeod. The first character to be introduced is Josh Tucker (Ryan Clayton), the rapist of David Platt (Jack P. Shepherd), in January. Gail Rodwell's (Helen Worth) clairvoyant Rosemary Piper (Sophie Thompson), Liz McDonald's (Beverley Callard) new love interest Mike Thornberry (Louis Emerick), school bully Tyler Jefferies (Will Barnett) and Geoff Metcalfe (Ian Bartholomew), Tim Metcalfe's (Joe Duttine) father, joined the show in March. April saw Emma Brooker (Alexandra Mardell), a new love interest for David, and Kayla Clifton (Mollie Winnard), a character introduced to continue Bethany Platt's (Lucy Fallon) sexual exploitation storyline, make their first appearances, while the year's first birth, Susie Price, daughter of Aidan Connor (Shayne Ward) and Eva Price (Catherine Tyldesley), also took place this month. Paul Foreman (Peter Ash) made his first appearance in May for a guest stint, before returning to the serial regularly in January 2019. Mr Fitzgerald (Adam Weafer) appeared in July. Sally Metcalfe's (Sally Dynevor) lawyer Paula Martin (Stirling Gallacher) joined the cast in August, while Liz and Jim McDonald's (Charles Lawson) fraudulent "daughter" Hannah Gilmore (Hannah Ellis Ryan), Tyrone Dobbs' (Alan Halsall) long-lost grandmother Evelyn Plummer (Maureen Lipman) and Tyler's mother Vicky Jefferies (Kerri Quinn) were introduced in September. Elsa Tilsley (Kelly Harrison), Nick Tilsley's (Ben Price) secret wife, joined the cast in November.

== Josh Tucker ==
Josh Tucker
- Coronation Street character
- Portrayed by: Ryan Clayton
- Duration: 2018–2020
- First appearance: Episode 9363/9364; 26 January 2018
- Last appearance: Episode 9973; 3 January 2020
- Introduced by: Kate Oates (2018); Iain MacLeod (2019)
In-universe information
- Occupation: Car mechanic

Josh Tucker, played by Ryan Clayton, made his first appearance on 26 January 2018. Details about the character were announced in early December 2017. Clayton's casting was announced on 16 January 2018. In July 2018, Clayton was longlisted for the "Best Bad Boy" award at the Inside Soap Awards. He did not progress to the viewer-voted shortlist. Clayton filmed his final scenes later in the year and Josh departs in episode 9575, first broadcast on 1 October 2018.

In July 2019, it was announced that Clayton had reprised his role as Josh, who would return for a story with David Platt (Jack P. Shepherd). He returns for a guest stint and the character is stabbed as part of the story. David becomes the prime suspect for the stabbing and Shepherd admitted that the scripts were vague as to whether David is responsible, so the outcome is unknown. The character returned in the episode broadcast on 18 October 2019 when David spots him in a prison hospital awaiting treatment. Another prisoner then explains that Josh is in prison for drugging and raping someone, like he had to David.

When a vacancy arises at Webster's Autocentre, following the death of their mechanic Luke Britton (Dean Fagan), Josh approaches co-owner Tyrone Dobbs (Alan Halsall) and asks if he needs to fix anything in order to prove he is worthy of the job. After a brief interview, despite querying about the number of different towns and garages he has worked in, Tyrone agrees to give Josh the job. Josh also impresses Tyrone by suggesting that they and other street residents should remember Luke by hosting a charity boxing match in his honour.

Over the following months, Josh befriends David and the pair often hang out and go drinking together. This initially causes problems in David's relationship with his girlfriend, Shona Ramsey (Julia Goulding). However, Shona eventually accepts their friendship. When Shona, David and Josh are drinking in the pub with some of their neighbours, Shona comments on the chemistry between Josh and Alya Nazir (Sair Khan). David dismisses this idea leading Shona to tease him about wanting Josh all to himself. Josh overhears this and becomes more flirtatious with David.

In March, Josh spikes David's drink with GHB during a night out. He takes David back to his flat and rapes him. David awakens in Josh's bed and realises with horror what happened to him. When Josh turns up at his house the next day, David confronts him but Josh manipulates David by claiming that they got drunk and had a consensual one-night stand. David's relationship with Shona suffers as a result of his secret rape trauma and he breaks up with her. Josh asks David if he ended his relationship because of their "one night stand" but an angry David tells Josh he is delusional and sick in the head if he thinks David ended his relationship because he wants to get together with him.

When Tyrone pulls out of the charity boxing match, David volunteers to fight his sister Sarah Platt's (Tina O'Brien) boyfriend Gary Windass (Mikey North) in his place despite his epilepsy ruling him out. Josh is refereeing the fight and taunts David during the break. David snaps and brutally beats up Gary in front of the shocked crowd. Josh does not bother to stop the fight. Gary is rushed to hospital where he recovers. Gary thinks David is suffering from post traumatic stress disorder as a result of witnessing his wife Kylie's murder two years previously.

David is arrested for ABH but released on bail. David has a one-night stand with new trainee hairdresser, Emma Brooker (Alexandra Mardell) and moves her into his house. However, after his neighbour Aidan Connor (Shayne Ward) commits suicide, David admits to Shona that Josh raped him. David is arrested for failing to turn up at court and Shona confronts Josh who continues to pretend he and David had a consensual one night stand. Josh arrives at Alya's house with flowers and charms her into bed to give himself a cover story in case David and Shona report him to the police.

Josh returns a month later when it is revealed that David had been following him to try and stop him from raping someone else. Billy Mayhew (Daniel Brocklebank) finds David and tells him to go home. However, once David leaves, Billy tells Ethan (the man Josh is with at a bar) that Josh is a rapist. It transpires that Josh was beaten up by Ethan after he found GHB in his pocket.

Josh is left temporarily blind in the hospital due to the attack. David is happy at Josh's suffering but Billy is wracked with guilt over his role. Billy tries to get Josh to admit his sins but fails. Josh is discharged from hospital in September 2018 and turns up at Billy's flat as he has nowhere to go. Billy reluctantly allows Josh to stay warning him to keep a low profile. Alya discovers that Josh is living at Billy's and tells David, who tells Billy that Josh also raped others so Billy throws Josh out.

In October 2018, Josh apologises for spiking David but is reluctant to admit to rape, giving half-truths. David bundles Josh into a car. Driving Josh to an alleyway, David tells him that he has driven him to the police station and demands him to hand himself to the police. Josh, terrified, pleads to David not to destroy his life, saying he would not cope in jail. He goes on to say he would be branded a rapist and likely to be put on a register. This satisfies David enough to reveal they are nowhere near a police station. Having gotten closure despite Josh not directly admitting to the rape, David drives off, leaving Josh behind.

After David was sentenced to 4 months in prison for fraud, he needed some painkillers, but as soon as he goes to the nurse, he pulls a distressed look when he witnesses Josh in the prison with multiple injuries. He was brutally beaten up by Terry "Tez" Collier for being a rapist. It turns out Josh was sent here for getting caught raping someone and GHB, the sentence was unknown. David was left distressed.

As David's sentence was nearly over, a prison riot occurred because of overcrowding and Abe Crowley (Liam Boyle) told David it was his chance to get revenge. But David protected Josh and went into a cell with him. David forces Josh to admit what he did, Josh admits he raped David and loads of other people, which left David infuriated.

Josh was later stabbed in prison with a pair of scissors. The police take David out of his cell and they charge him with attempted murder along with Abe and Tez.

David pleads not guilty along with the others, but he is refused bail despite his sentence being almost over. Josh lied to the police to frame David for stabbing him. The video showed Josh with a scissor stab and David walking out with no traces of blood left on him but the police do not believe David.

David phones Billy Mayhew asking him to talk to Josh in the hospital because apparently they were friends and he listens to him. Billy tries to get contact but he fails.

Paul Foreman disguises himself as a nurse and forces Josh to admit he lied and how much this is affecting David with multiple counts of persuasion.

Josh finally admits to the police he lied, and that Abe and Tez stabbed him. It's unknown what happened but it presumed he was charged with perverting the course of justice.

After David got let out of prison, Billy tells him Josh was charged with another count of rape against him, leaving David relieved.

Josh went on trial for his rape on 3 January 2020, David was left nervous because Shona was not there to support him since she is in a coma, David manages to testify against Josh.

On 8 January 2020, Josh was found guilty of raping David and the other people and was sentenced to 15 years in prison.

== Rosemary Piper ==
Rosemary Piper
- Coronation Street character
- Portrayed by: Sophie Thompson
- First appearance: Episode 9401; 12 March 2018
- Last appearance: Episode 9474/9475; 6 June 2018
- Introduced by: Kate Oates
In-universe information
- Occupation: Clairvoyant

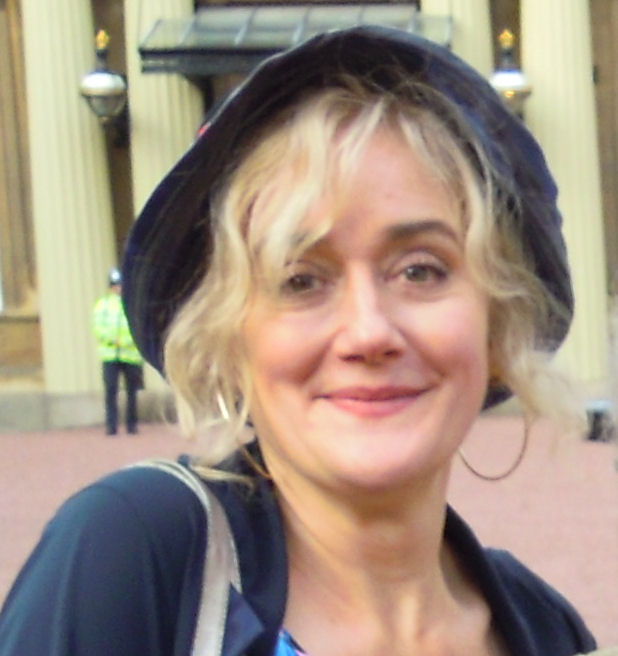
Actress Sophie Thompson portrays Rosemary.

Rosemary Piper, played by Sophie Thompson, made her first appearance on 12 March 2018. The character and Thompson's casting details were announced on 18 January 2018. Rosemary is a psychic medium, who tells Audrey Roberts (Sue Nicholls) that she has been in contact with her late husband Alf Roberts (Bryan Mosley). Audrey's daughter Gail Rodwell (Helen Worth) is unconvinced, but Rosemary tells her that she has also received messages from Gail's former, deceased husbands, including Richard Hillman (Brian Capron). Of Thompson's casting, a show spokesperson stated, "Sophie is perfect for the role of Rosemary and we are excited she is joining the cast and working alongside Helen and Sue. Gail and Audrey are convinced she is getting messages from Alf and Gail's husbands. It remains to be seen if she is all she claims to be."

The character's storyline was nominated for "Most Bizarre Soap Storyline" at the 2018 Digital Spy Reader Awards; it came in ninth place with 2.5% of the total votes.

Rosemary first appears when she books a hair appointment at Audrey's Salon. She claims that a former client of Audrey's, who recently died, recommended the salon. It emerges that Rosemary is conspiring with Lewis Archer (Nigel Havers) in a scheme against Gail, which Roy Cropper (David Neilson) and Cathy Matthews (Melanie Hill) become targets of too.

== Tyler Jefferies ==
Tyler Jefferies
- Coronation Street character
- Portrayed by: Will Barnett
- Duration: 2018–2019
- First appearance: Episode 9411; 22 March 2018
- Last appearance: Episode 9954; 18 December 2019
- Introduced by: Kate Oates
In-universe information
- Father: Jed Moss
- Mother: Vicky Jefferies
- Half-brothers: Sonny Jefferies

Tyler Jefferies, played by Will Barnett, made his first appearance on 22 March 2018. Tyler is a school friend of Simon Barlow (Alex Bain) who is involved in a gang. Barnett described Tyler as "[Someone who] has no respect for authority and just likes to cause trouble" and on his casting stated "I am super excited about my Corrie debut, we are having family and friends around to our house to celebrate this new chapter in my life." In December 2018, it was revealed that Tyler would become a teenage father with Simon's cousin Amy Barlow (Elle Mulvaney).

Tyler and his gang become friends with Simon and have a negative effect on his behaviour. The gang mugs Audrey Roberts (Sue Nicholls), which Simon later brags to Tyler about regarding his involvement. Tyler and his gang continue to loiter around the street. When Carla Connor (Alison King) advises Simon to leave the gang, Tyler threatens her. Tyler and Simon throw a brick through a car windscreen, steal alcohol from the local shop and play truant. Tyler is disgusted when Simon sends a text from Tyler's mobile to Summer Spellman (Matilda Freeman) suggesting that Tyler wants to date her. He warns him to never use his phone again. A few months later, Tyler and Simon discover that pensioner Flora McArdle (Eileen Davies) has inherited a large sum of money and decide to rob her flat while she is out. As they do, Flora returns. Tyler knocks her unconscious. Simon confesses his and Tyler's involvement to the police, who arrest Tyler. After the confession, Tyler gives repeatedly threatens Simon and poisons the family dog, Eccles. Simon unsuccessfully testifies against Tyler in court, although Tyler receives a custodial sentence after posting a video online bragging about getting away with his crimes and insulting the judge. Tyler's friends continue to harass Simon until Simon's father Peter Barlow (Chris Gascoyne) speaks to Tyler's mother, Vicky (Kerri Quinn) about it.

== Mike Thornberry ==
Mike Thornberry
- Coronation Street character
- Portrayed by: Louis Emerick
- First appearance: Episode 9415; 28 March 2018
- Last appearance: Episode 9648; 25 December 2018
- Introduced by: Kate Oates
In-universe information
- Occupation: Former teacher Taxi driver

Mike Thornberry, portrayed by Louis Emerick, made his first appearance on 28 March 2018. The character and Emerick's casting details were announced on 27 January 2018. Emerick began filming on 31 January. Mike is a love interest for Liz McDonald (Beverley Callard) and a former school teacher of Liz's son, Steve McDonald (Simon Gregson). Emerick signed a three-month contract with Coronation Street. Emerick expressed his delight at joining the show. He commented, "To say I'm chuffed is the biggest understatement ever!" Emerick previously appeared in the soap in 1986 as a delivery man.

Mike arrives to ask Steve for a job at his taxi firm, StreetCars, which he agrees to. Alison Slade of What's on TV reported that Steve thinks that "there's some fun to be had in being his teacher's boss." Mike tries to win the attraction of Liz, which Steve dislikes. On 24 April 2018, it was confirmed that his contract would not be renewed at its conclusion, but he had not finished filming yet. When the announcement received criticism, Emerick defended the news, stating that he was aware of the length of his contract when he joined. He confirmed that he would not be killed off. Mike made his final appearance on 29 June 2018 after his relationship with Liz. On 22 August, it was announced that Emerick would return to the series in December, following a positive response to his character during his initial stint. Chris Edwards of Digital Spy reported that Mike returns because he has "unfinished business" with Liz.

== Geoff Metcalfe ==
Geoff Metcalfe
- Coronation Street character
- Portrayed by: Ian Bartholomew
- Duration: 2018–2022
- First appearance: Episode 9415; 28 March 2018
- Last appearance: Episode 10,725; 24 August 2022
- Introduced by: Kate Oates
In-universe information
- Occupation: Hospital Radio DJ; Magician; Waiter
- Wife: Elaine Jones (backstory); Tessa Metcalfe (backstory); Yasmeen Nazir (2019–2020)
- Sons: Tim Metcalfe
- Granddaughters: Faye Windass
- Other relatives: Miley Hodge

Geoff Metcalfe, portrayed by Ian Bartholomew, made his first appearance on 28 March 2018. The character was announced on 22 March 2018, while Bartholomew's casting details were announced after the episode's transmission. Lindsay revealed that Geoff would already have relatives on the show, but did not confirm who they were. After the broadcast of his first episode, Daniel Kilkelly of Digital Spy wondered whether he could be related to established character Tim Metcalfe (Joe Duttine).

Tim sends Faye to live with Geoff because he fears for her safety with Pat Phelan (Connor McIntyre) creating trouble for Faye's family. On 30 March, it was revealed that Geoff is the father of Tim when he visited Tim's wife, Sally Metcalfe (Sally Dynevor) and Tim's daughter, Faye Windass (Ellie Leach). Producers kept Geoff's identity a secret until the episode's transmission.

Geoff was introduced as a love interest for Audrey Roberts (Sue Nicholls) and the DJ at Weatherfield General's radio station. Duncan Lindsay of the Metro described Geoff as "dashing". Geoff meets Audrey and Rita Tanner (Barbara Knox) at the hospital after Audrey is admitted to the hospital and they mistake Geoff for a doctor. Geoff dedicates a song on his radio station to Audrey and he asks Audrey to join him on his radio show. Lindsay (Metro) reported that Geoff and Audrey would "have a laugh together" after she becomes locked in the radio studio.

Geoff later meets and eventually marries Yasmeen Nazir.

In 2019, Geoff began controlling Yasmeen. In 2020, Yasmeen eventually fights back and hits Geoff over the head with a wine bottle before stabbing him in the neck with it. Geoff survives and claims to others that Yasmeen was the abuser in their relationship. Tim and Faye initially supported Geoff, but later turned against him after seeing footage of him abusing Yasmeen and tell him that they want nothing to do with him anymore.

At Yasmeen's trial, Geoff attempted to paint her as a violent alcoholic, who attacked him unprovoked. It is also revealed that Elaine (Paula Wilcox), Tim's mother, is alive, after she reads the notice of the trial, and that she too ran away from Geoff and their son after he abused her. He attempted to silence Elaine, into not giving evidence at the trial. However, this failed and Elaine came to court and gave her evidence where she said that after leaving Geoff, she tried to retrieve a then infant Tim, but Geoff had warned her off by threatening to kill Tim. Yasmeen's defence Imran also showed footage of Geoff arriving at the hospital where Elaine was to threaten her. Despite Geoff's attempts to claim that he had actually been visiting patients at the hospital, the jury finds Yasmeen not guilty with Geoff calling the trial "a farce".

Geoff later arrives at Yasmeen's flat and attempts to convince her to sell him her share of their home so that he can start a new life with Christine, his new love interest. Yasmeen agrees on the condition that she can visit their home and collect some photographs of her family. Geoff agrees. Later Geoff attacks Alya at Speed Dhal and leaves her unconscious, he then returns to the house where Yasmeen is and sets fire to the photographs she has collected. To escape the flames and smoke Yasmeen flees into the loft and climbs onto the roof. Geoff follows her, threatening to push her off. Alya appears trying to aide Yasmeen, who berates Geoff and he slides down the roof. When Yasmeen casts him her scarf, Geoff fails to grab it in time and falls off the roof to his death.

In 2022, he made a guest appearance in one of Yasmeen's nightmares.

== Emma Brooker ==
Emma Brooker, portrayed by Alexandra Mardell, made her first appearance on 20 April 2018.

== Kayla Clifton ==
Kayla Clifton
- Coronation Street character
- Portrayed by: Mollie Winnard
- First appearance: Episode 9441; 27 April 2018
- Last appearance: Episode 9519; 27 July 2018
- Introduced by: Kate Oates
In-universe information
- Other names: Kayla Westbrook
- Occupation: Restaurant worker
- Father: Neil Clifton
- Mother: Marsha Westbrook

Kayla Clifton (also credited as Kayla Westbrook), portrayed by Mollie Winnard, made her first appearance on 27 April 2018. The character and Winnard's casting details were announced on 21 March 2018. Kayla is an employee at Zeedan Nazir's (Qasim Akhtar) restaurant, Speed Daal. Alison Slade of What's on TV reported that Kayla would create problems for Bethany Platt (Lucy Fallon) and Craig Tinker (Colson Smith). On 27 July 2018, it was confirmed that Winnard had made her final appearance as Kayla. A show spokesperson stated that Kayla could return in the future though. In October 2018, Winnard won the "Best Bad Girl" accolade for her role as Kayla at the Inside Soap Awards. For her portrayal of Kayla, Winnard was nominated for Best Soap Newcomer at the 2018 Digital Spy Reader Awards; she came in eleventh place with 2.1% of the total votes.

On 6 May 2018, it was reported that Kayla is the daughter of Neil Clifton (Ben Cartwright), who was involved in Bethany's grooming storyline in 2017. Kayla keeps her identity a secret, suggesting that she could seek revenge on Bethany and Craig, who helped convict Neil. Kayla gives Craig her phone number, upsetting Bethany. It was reported that Bethany would suffer flashbacks of her encounters with Neil and would struggle to move on after being faced with "a daily reminder of the horror of what she's been through."

== Susie Price ==
Susie Price
- Coronation Street character
- Portrayed by: Lexi & Liberty Kingsberry-Jones (2018); Edison & Isaac Manning (2018); Aurora Bradshaw (2025–present)
- Duration: 2018, 2025–present
- First appearance: Episode 9444; 30 April 2018
- Introduced by: Kate Oates (2018; Kate Brooks (2025)
In-universe information
- Other names: Susie Barlow
- Father: Aidan Connor
- Mother: Eva Price
- Grandfathers: Johnny Connor
- Grandmothers: Stella Price; Lou Connor
- Aunts: Leanne Battersby; Carla Connor; Kate Connor
- First cousins: Oliver Battersby; Simon Barlow (adoptive)
- Other relatives: Michelle Connor; Gloria Price

Susie Price (formerly Barlow) made her first appearance on 30 April 2018. She is portrayed by two sets of twins, girls Lexi and Liberty and boys Eddison and Isaac. Susie is the daughter of Eva Price (Catherine Tyldesley) and Aidan Connor (Shayne Ward), although Toyah Battersby (Georgia Taylor) agrees to raise her after Eva decides she does not want a child. On Toyah's plan to raise Eva's baby, Taylor said it "seems to come out of the blue" in a "split second", with Toyah figuring out how it can work, but it is "tiptoed around in previous conversations." Tyldesley and Taylor spent eight hours filming the labour scenes. Tyldesley used her own experiences to portray the scenes and said that she "felt like I'd given birth". Tyldesley explained that Eva is scared when she goes into labour alone and after Susie is born, she tries to avoid bonding with her at risk of establishing a connection with her. However, Tyldesley pointed out that when Eva holds Susie, she "fall[s] in love with her".

When the surrogate mother carrying a baby for Toyah and Peter Barlow (Chris Gascoyne) miscarries, Eva agrees to hand her unborn daughter to Toyah, under the pretence that the baby is the surrogate's. Eva gives birth in a cottage in Lymm with the help of Toyah and the baby is named Susie after Peter's late twin sister, Susan Barlow (Joanna Foster). Toyah finds pictures that Eva had taken with Susie, but Eva insists Toyah is her mother and Toyah later returns to Weatherfield with Susie. Upon her return in 2025, it was announced that Aurora Bradshaw would be taking over the role of Susie when her mother returns with her new family.

== Paul Foreman ==
Paul Foreman
- Coronation Street character
- Portrayed by: Peter Ash
- Duration: 2018–2024
- First appearance: Episode 9441; 11 May 2018
- Last appearance: Episode 11,355; 8 November 2024
- Introduced by: Kate Oates (2018); Iain Macleod (2019)
In-universe information
- Other names: Apollo Foreman
- Occupation: Packer; Helpline operator Labourer; Hairdresser Assistant
- Father: Denny Foreman
- Mother: Bernie Winter
- Sisters: Gemma Winter
- Half-brothers: Kit Green
- Husband: Billy Mayhew (2023–2024)
- Stepdaughters: Summer Spellman (adoptive)
- Uncles: Mike Winter
- Nephews: Aled Winter-Brown; Bryn Winter-Brown; Brody Michaelis
- Nieces: Carys Winter-Brown; Llio Winter-Brown

Apollo "Paul" Foreman, portrayed by Peter Ash, initially appeared for a few episodes in May 2018, before returning on 1 January 2019. Paul was initially introduced as the cellmate of David Platt (Jack P. Shepherd) while he is in prison for attacking Gary Windass (Mikey North). On his return, it was revealed he is the twin brother of Gemma Winter (Dolly-Rose Campbell). On 24 March 2023, it was announced that Paul would be diagnosed with motor neurone disease, and that this storyline would eventually result in the character's death which was broadcast on 9 September 2024. Paul returned in November 2024 as an apparition seen by Billy, as his husband struggled to cope with the death of Paul.

Paul is first seen greeting David in prison who was reluctant to share with another man following his ordeal with Josh Tucker (Ryan Clayton). David warned Paul to stay away from him and later lashed out and pinned him to a wall as Paul gently tried to wake him up. David later apologised to Paul and admitted that he could do with a mate inside, but Paul informed him that there were no "mates" in prison and that he would have to learn to fend for himself.

On New Year's Day 2019, Paul arrives in Weatherfield and asks for help from David in finding him a job. David puts him in contact with the local vicar Billy Mayhew (Daniel Brocklebank), who helps him get a job with Carla Connor (Alison King) at her factory, Underworld. Paul's twin sister Gemma is upset by his reappearance. Her attempts to get him fired are unsuccessful and Paul takes delight in winding her up. It is later revealed that Paul took the blame for Gemma accidentally causing the death of an elderly woman in a home robbery and spent some time in prison as a result.

Paul's cheeky and cheerful nature endear him to the Weatherfield residents. He flirts with Billy and they share a passionate kiss. Billy thinks it's the start of a new relationship but is dismayed to see Paul on a date in someone else. Paul later deletes his dating app and indicates that he is ready for a committed relationship and begins dating Billy after their chemistry becomes undeniable. He mends his relationship with Gemma when they work together to steal back a necklace that Paul had stolen from a church yard sale. His romance with Billy later comes to an end when they conflict over Paul's petty crimes and Billy falsely suspecting Paul of mugging Sean Tully (Antony Cotton). He is one of the protesters in Underworld when the roof collapses though he survives. Paul and Rita are present when Gemma learns that she is pregnant by her boyfriend Chesney Brown (Sam Aston) and he counsels her to be honest with him about the baby and stay in Weatherfield to raise the child. It takes some time but Gemma agrees and she and Chesney prepare for the birth of their child, later revealed to actually be quadruplets.

Paul and Gemma's mother Bernie Winter (Jane Hazlegrove) arrives in the summer after learning of Gemma's pregnancy. Paul wants nothing to do with Bernie or her frequent cash scams and is angered when she and Gemma repair their relationship. Bernie and Paul spend much of their time arguing with each other even as Bernie tries to reunite their family. He is shocked when Bernie reconnects with her old boyfriend Kel Hinchley (Joseph Hinchley) who last saw the family when Gemma and Paul were fourteen. Paul's reaction to Kel raises Billy's suspicions but Billy's attempts to get Paul to open up are angrily rebuffed. Billy suspects, and Paul later confirms, that Kel groomed and sexually abused a teenage Paul. Paul insists that it was consensual over Billy's objections that it was abuse. He talks to Kel about the past and they have a confrontation in the alley that leads to Kel being knocked out when Paul realises he was abused. When Paul finds out Billy has given his mum a job, he confronts Billy and presses him for a reason as to why he would employ someone so untrustworthy, a question leading to Billy admitting that he loves Paul and just wants to help. Reeling from the declaration, Paul speaks to David who had been through something similar, when David explains his wife Shona was the one to help him through his ordeal, this strikes a Chord with Paul who realises Billy has been his rock throughout. Paul returns and admits that he wants Billy in his life and the two kiss.

When Billy's ex Todd Grimshaw returned and set up a scheme to tear the couple apart, Paul lost his family and was framed for multiple wrongdoings that were actually done by Todd. Todd's apprentice Will set Todd up and his crimes were exposed to a shocked street during what was meant to be a charity calendar event. Billy cut Todd from his and Summer's life and attempted to make amends with Paul. The emotional scars healed and the three united to help Summer in her time of need during her eating disorder.

By 2023, Billy realised he still loved Paul and confessed this to him where the two shared a moment of passion. Paul felt he could not commit with Billy, however, with Billy still believing Todd was the one to attack Mike Hargrave. Paul came clean with support from Todd and he reunited with Billy as a result.

On 5 April 2023 Paul is told by a neurologist that he may be suffering from onset Motor Neurone Disease, with the news not being shared with his family or friends.

For his performance in Coronation Street, Ash won the "Best Newcomer" award at the 25th National Television Awards in 2020. He beat out Hollyoaks' Imran Adams (Mitchell Deveraux), Casualty's Jack Nolan (Will Noble), Emmerdale's Jurell Carter (Nate Robinson), and EastEnders' Max Bowden (Ben Mitchell).

In April 2024, it was announced that Danny Cunningham was going to be joining the cast of Coronation Street as Paul and Gemma's father Denny Foreman, who made his first appearance on 29 April 2024.

== Zack Rubinstein ==
Zack Rubinstein
- Coronation Street character
- Portrayed by: Alfie and Mikey Fletcher (2018); Phoenix and Sebastian Winnington (2018–2019)
- Duration: 2018–2019
- First appearance: Episode 9466; 25 May 2018
- Last appearance: Episode 9682; 1 February 2019
- Introduced by: Kate Oates
In-universe information
- Father: Gary Windass
- Mother: Nicola Rubinstein
- Stepmother: Maria Connor
- Half-brothers: Jake Windass
- Grandfathers: Eddie Windass; Pat Phelan
- Grandmothers: Anna Windass; Annabel Rubinstein
- Aunts: Faye Windass (adoptive)
- First cousins: Miley Hodge (adoptive)

Zack Rubinstein is the son of Nicola Rubinstein (Nicola Thorp) and Gary Windass (Mikey North) who is born by caesarean section. He was named after Nicola's real father Isaac who was the man who brought her up, much to the delight of her stepmother Eileen Grimshaw (Sue Cleaver). He departs with Nicola after she decides to leave Weatherfield in light of her villainous birth father Pat Phelan (Connor McIntyre) being killed by Gary's mother Anna Windass (Debbie Rush) at the conclusion of his lethal siege, wherein Phelan nearly endangered Zack upon shooting both Nicola and one of their neighbours Michelle Connor (Kym Marsh). He was originally played by Alfie and Mikey Fletcher, but where recast to Phoenix and Sebastian Winnington for three episodes and then again for Zack's return episodes in 2019.

== Mr Fitzgerald ==
Mr Fitzgerald
- Coronation Street character
- Portrayed by: Adam Weafer
- Appears in: Episode 9508/9; 16 July 2018
- Introduced by: Kate Oates
In-universe information
- Occupation: Secondary school teacher

Mr Fitzgerald, portrayed by Adam Weafer, appeared in two episodes first broadcast on 16 July 2018. Mikie O'Loughlin of RSVP Live reported on 28 June 2018 that Weafer would guest star in the show as a teacher. On the role, Weafer told Siobhan O'Connor of the Irish Mirror, "It's only a couple of episodes and it's got a mad ending to it." The actor was invited to audition for the role and was surprised to discover he was successful. Weafer filmed for the role across one week and enjoyed the process. He had hoped to reprise the role in the future and opined that it would be good to introduce a new Irish character to the soap opera. Dianne Bourne of the Manchester Evening News described the character as "dodgy" and said that he "caused a stir among viewers".

Mr Fitzgerald is a teacher at local secondary school, Weatherfield High School. He drops off a van for repair at mechanics garage, Webster's Autos. Mechanic Abi Franklin (Sally Carman) discovers drugs in the glove compartment of the van and informs the police. They arrive at the garage as Mr Fitzgerald comes to collect the van; he is arrested for drug possession.

== Paula Martin ==
Paula Martin
- Coronation Street character
- Portrayed by: Stirling Gallacher
- Duration: 2018–2020
- First appearance: Episode 9537; 17 August 2018
- Last appearance: Episode 10073; 10 June 2020
- Introduced by: Kate Oates
In-universe information
- Occupation: Lawyer/Solicitor
- Daughters: Isla Martin

Paula Martin, portrayed by Stirling Gallacher, made her first appearance on 17 August 2018. The character was originally called Paula Cunliffe, although this was later changed. At the time of the announcement, Gallacher had already begun filming. Paula is billed as a "hugely successful lawyer" and a childhood friend of Sally Metcalfe (Sally Dynevor) and Gina Seddon (Connie Hyde). Paula is introduced when Sally asks for her help after being conned by a fraudster. Dynevor explained that Sally disliked Paula as a child and bullied her because she was "popular" and "the real pretty girl". She added that Paula would get along with Sally and Gina when they reunite and that they would be seen "laughing, getting drunk and reminiscing about old times". Daniel Kilkelly of Digital Spy liked Paula's introduction and described her first scenes as "hilariously snobby". Dynevor told Kilkelly that when Paula becomes romantically involved with Sally's daughter Sophie (Brooke Vincent), her friendship with Sally is ruined.

== Sabeen Habeeb ==
Sabeen Habeeb
- Coronation Street character
- Portrayed by: Avita Jay (2018); Zora Bishop (2021)
- Duration: 2018, 2021
- First appearance: 20 August 2018
- Last appearance: 20 October 2021
- Introduced by: Kate Oates (2018); Iain MacLeod (2021)
In-universe information
- Occupation: Lawyer
- Husband: Imran Habeeb (backstory)

Sabeen Habeeb, originally played by Avita Jay, is the estranged wife of Imran Habeeb (Charlie De Melo) who turns up to Imran's father Hassan's funeral. When Imran learns that his mother invited her, he is furious. 3 years later, now played by Zora Bishop. Sabeen invites Imran to the bistro to inform him that she would be representing Corey Brent (Maximus Evans) in court regarding the murder of Seb Franklin (Harry Visinoni), and that his client Kelly Neelan (Millie Gibson), who was also on trial for Seb's murder, would not stand a chance against her in court.

After the trial, it is revealed that Sabeen is representing drug lord Harvey Gaskell (Will Mellor) following the appeal of his prison sentence. Sabeen asks Imran to help her with the appeal but he refuses, because he knows that Harvey had terrorised Leanne Battersby (Jane Danson) and Simon Barlow (Alex Bain). Sabeen is annoyed by this, so starts blackmailing Imran by telling him to help her with the appeal or else she will expose his one-night stand with Abi Franklin (Sally Carman) to Toyah Battersby (Georgia Taylor). Imran gives in by trying to find information about Harvey's aunt Sharon Bentley (Tracie Bennett); however, Sabeen realises that she is ruining Imran's life, so eventually drops it. He later comes clean to Toyah about everything anyways who is furious with Imran. They later reconcile.

== Hannah Gilmore ==
Hannah Gilmore
- Coronation Street character
- Portrayed by: Hannah Ellis Ryan
- First appearance: Episode 9555; 7 September 2018
- Last appearance: Episode 9585; 12 October 2018
- Introduced by: Kate Oates
In-universe information
- Other names: Katie McDonald; Hannah Moorside

Hannah Gilmore (also Moorside), portrayed by Hannah Ellis Ryan, made her first appearance in the episode first broadcast on 7 September 2018. Initially, the character was thought to be Katie McDonald, who was first referenced in January 1992 when she was born prematurely off-screen to Liz McDonald (Beverley Callard) and Jim McDonald (Charles Lawson) and died shortly afterwards. It was announced on 16 July 2018 that the character would appear in the series, twenty-six years after her supposed death. It was reported that Liz would discover that there had been an error made at the hospital and that Katie had survived, before being adopted and moved to Australia. Then, when she was 18, Katie began looking for her parents, finding Jim through his military records. The twist will "turn Liz's world upside down" as she struggles to cope with the news.

The casting of Australian actress Ellis Ryan was announced on 18 July. On her casting, a show spokesperson commented, "They've cleverly cast the role of Jim and Liz's daughter to a beautiful woman in the hope of making her the street's new resident fox." The introduction of Hannah was criticised by fans, who disliked that producers were rewriting the show's history. On 27 July, it was revealed that the character would be called Hannah, not Katie, having had her name changed after being adopted.

Episodes following the character's first appearance reveal that Hannah is not Katie McDonald and is working with Jim to scam Liz and their son, Steve McDonald (Simon Gregson). Lawson explained that Hannah visited Jim in prison and wanted to care for him, which he appreciated as he felt "abandoned". He added that the relationship is "a spooky one". The actor revealed that Hannah is leading the scam and Jim regrets the plan as soon as he sees Liz again. He also predicted that the storyline would be emotional. Justin Harp of Digital Spy described Hannah and Jim's relationship as "disgusting".

The character's storyline won the accolade for "Most Bizarre Soap Storyline" at the 2018 Digital Spy Reader Awards.

Hannah first appears when she meets with Jim McDonald. Liz and Jim meet for dinner, where he explains that a woman traced him through his Army records and revealed herself to be their daughter Katie. Jim then introduces Hannah to Liz as their daughter; Liz is shaken and tells Hannah to leave. Jim explains that there was a mix-up with the babies at the hospital and Katie was swapped with the baby of an Australian couple; Jim hands Liz the results of a DNA test and a photo of Hannah. In a conversation between Hannah and Jim, it emerges that they are in a relationship and they are planning to scam Liz and Steve as revenge for letting Jim reside in prison. In December 2018, she and Jim are arrested as a result of their scam; however, due to a lack of evidence and the fact that Liz handed her money over willingly they could not be charged and so were allowed to walk free.

== Evelyn Plummer ==
Evelyn Plummer
- Coronation Street character
- Portrayed by: Maureen Lipman
- Duration: 2018–2025
- First appearance: Episode 9558; 12 September 2018
- Last appearance: Episode 11756; 25 December 2025
- Introduced by: Kate Oates
In-universe information
- Sisters: Millie
- Husband: Harold Plummer (backstory)
- Daughters: Cassie Plummer
- Grandsons: Tyrone Dobbs
- Other relatives: Ruby Dobbs; Dorin Pop; Hope Dobbs (adoptive)

Evelyn Plummer, portrayed by Maureen Lipman, made her first appearance on 12 September 2018. The character and Lipman's casting details were announced on 3 August 2018. Evelyn is introduced as the grandmother of established character Tyrone Dobbs (Alan Halsall). The character is billed as an "outspoken battleaxe" and a "nuisance". Producer Iain MacLeod described her as "eye-wateringly withering", while Lipman described the character as a "nasty" person and a "monster". The actress also called Evelyn "unpleasant and mean" and a "stroppy cow". Chris Riches of the Daily Express reported that Evelyn would "ruffle a few feathers on the Street". Lipman had previously appeared in the soap as Lillian Spencer in 2002. The actress decided to join the cast after receiving a "sign" from her late husband, former Coronation Street writer Jack Rosenthal, that she should accept the role of Evelyn.

Evelyn arrives after Tyrone researches his family history following the death of his mother, Jackie Dobbs (Margi Clarke). Evelyn then moves into Tyrone and his partner Fiz Stape's (Jennie McAlpine) house, "[wasting] no time in making herself comfortable." MacLeod said that he was "beyond thrilled" to introduce the character and believed that she would "add a fresh dollop of northern humour to the show as she turns Tyrone and Fiz's lives upside down". Advanced spoilers for the character's introduction explained that after rejecting Tyrone, he discovers that she is being evicted and has nowhere to stay. She visits Weatherfield and after conning Dev Alahan (Jimmi Harkishin) and spending time in the Rovers Return Inn pub, she agrees to move into Tyrone and Fiz's home.

In an interview with Claire Crick of What's on TV, Lipman revealed that Evelyn would clash with Tyrone's partner, Fiz, leading to McAlpine's temporary exit from the show. The actress explained that Evelyn's "boorish behaviour" would cause Fiz to leave. Lipman also spoke about Evelyn's relationship with Tyrone, stating that it was "prickly". Tyrone is Evelyn's only remaining family member and he helps her when she has nobody else, but she refuses to appreciate his efforts. Lipman commented, "Tyrone's a darling and she just comes along and wrecks everything." Despite Evelyn's brash manner, Lipman believed that her character was redeemable and hoped that writers would include some kinder traits in Evelyn.

In March 2023, Evelyn's pet dog Cerberus was killed-off, and Evelyn blamed her friend Roy Cropper (David Neilson) for his death. In June 2023, the character took an extended break from the soap.

In December 2024, Lipman announced that she would not be returning full-time to the soap after her extended break, but would return as a recurring character instead.

== Vicky Jefferies ==
Vicky Jefferies
- Coronation Street character
- Portrayed by: Kerri Quinn
- Duration: 2018–2019
- First appearance: Episode 9562; 17 September 2018
- Last appearance: Episode 9958; 26 December 2019
- Introduced by: Kate Oates
In-universe information
- Sons: Tyler Jefferies; Sonny Jefferies

Vicky Jefferies, portrayed by Kerri Quinn, made her first appearance on 17 September 2018. Vicky is introduced as the mother of Tyler Jefferies (Will Barnett), a young gang leader. Vicky features in a storyline with Peter Barlow (Chris Gascoyne) following a rivalry between Tyler and Peter's son, Simon Barlow (Alex Bain). Quinn told Ivan Little of the Belfast Telegraph that Vicky would "kick up a storm" when she appears. Vicky will appear in 10 episodes with the possibility to extend this. Producers asked Quinn to keep her Belfast accent for the role. Quinn temporarily moved to Manchester, where the show is filmed, from Northern Ireland to film for the role. Quinn was offered the role after she impressed producers during several meetings for another character which she did not get.

== Elsa Tilsley ==
Elsa Tilsley
- Coronation Street character
- Portrayed by: Kelly Harrison
- Duration: 2018–2019
- First appearance: Episode 9608; 9 November 2018
- Last appearance: Episode 9667; 15 January 2019
- Introduced by: Kate Oates
In-universe information
- Husband: Nick Tilsley (2017–2019)

Elsa Tilsley, portrayed by Kelly Harrison, made her first appearance on 9 November 2018. The character and Harrison's casting details were announced on 30 October 2018. She is introduced as the secret wife of Nick Tilsley (Ben Price).

Elsa comes to Weatherfield looking for Nick after he claimed that his mother, Gail Rodwell (Helen Worth) was seriously ill. Upon finding her, Nick tells her he wants a divorce. Elsa later sees Carla Connor (Alison King) in Nick's car and accuses her of having an affair with him. Carla tells Elsa that she is simply Nick's business partner and he has invested in her company, Underworld. She finds out that Nick has been sleeping with Leanne Battersby (Jane Danson) and as Elsa wants revenge, Carla offers her Nick's share of Underworld. Elsa later agrees to divorce Nick as long as he returns all of the money he stole. Nick returns her money after he steals from his grandmother, Audrey Roberts (Sue Nicholls). However, after she sees an online post by Leanne showing a piece of jewellery that Nick had bought her, she returns to Weatherfield and puts their divorce on hold.

== Other characters ==
| Date(s) | Character | Actor | Circumstances |
|---|---|---|---|
| 12 January – 26 February | Sam Bryce | Amy Dolan | Sam is a friend of Bethany Platt (Lucy Fallon) who works at a lap dancing club. When Bethany's boyfriend, Craig Tinker (Colson Smith), asks who Sam is, Bethany claims that she is a member of a victim support group that she is attending. Sam encourages Bethany to be honest with Craig and her family. Craig, a police officer, attends a call to Sam and Bethany's club after Sam is groped by a drunk customer. When Sam is unable to give a clear description of her attacker, Bethany is asked to give a description, forcing her to face Craig. |
| 16–28 May | Dec Lonsdale | Josh Harper | Dec is a former colleague of Josh Tucker (Ryan Clayton). Shona Ramsey (Julia Goulding) visits Dec to speak to him about Josh, hoping to find evidence about Josh after he rapes Shona's boyfriend, David Platt (Jack P. Shepherd). Shona presses Dec for information, so he tells her that Josh was fired for fighting with a customer and said that he can not be trusted. Dec later visits Josh and confesses that he was also raped by Josh; he also asks Shona to leave him alone. |
| 8 June | Phillip Schofield | Himself | Phillip Schofield and Holly Willoughby interview Rosie Webster (Helen Flanagan), Gemma Winter (Dolly-Rose Campbell) and Craig Tinker (Colson Smith) on This Morning, following their involvement in a drugs bust. |
| 8 June | Holly Willoughby | Herself | Phillip Schofield and Holly Willoughby interview Rosie Webster (Helen Flanagan), Gemma Winter (Dolly-Rose Campbell) and Craig Tinker (Colson Smith) on This Morning, following their involvement in a drugs bust. |
| 29 May – 14 January 2019 | Olivia Radfield | Arianna Ajtar | Olivia is a model who works on a fashion shoot at Underworld factory booked by her agent Antoine Reese (Jay Rincon). She meets Rosie Webster (Helen Flanagan) at the photoshoot and Rosie warns Olivia to check the extra bag that Antoine gave her. She discovers drugs inside the bag, something which Antoine had done to Rosie when she travelled to the UK a year earlier. Olivia works with Rosie and Gemma Winter (Dolly-Rose Campbell) to expose Antoine. They replace the drugs with icing sugar, but leave one package with drugs. The women then place the drugs in Antoine's luggage. |
| 11 June – 14 January 2019 | Duncan Radfield | Nicholas Gleaves | Duncan is the father of Olivia Radfield (Arianna Ajtar). He applies for a council grant towards setting up a charity in memory of his dead wife, May. He thanks Sally Metcalfe (Sally Dynevor) for Rosie's involvement in saving Olivia from prison. |
| 25 June – 25 July | Marsha Westbrook | Joanne Mitchell | Marsha is the mother of Kayla Clifton (Mollie Winnard) and ex-wife of Neil Clifton (Ben Cartwright). |
| 1–24 August 17 May 2021 – 25 June 2021 | Carol Hill | Emma Hartley-Miller | A homeless woman who befriends Sean Tully (Antony Cotton) while he sleeps rough. She finds him years later and discovers that he is earning lots of money through a business called Double Glammy, and she asks him if she can be involved. |
| 3 August | Helen Newton | Lily Knight | Helen meets with Henry Newton (George Banks) at The Rovers Return Inn public house. When Henry tells Helen that he hasn't told his girlfriend, Gemma Winter (Dolly-Rose Campbell), his secret, she calls him a "coward" and warns him to tell Gemma before she does. Their conversation is heard by Chesney Brown (Sam Aston), who confronts Henry. He reveals that Helen is his sister and that his allowance has been stopped by his parents. |
| 14 November – 5 December | Steff Mulvenney | Sarah Middleton | Steff was a woman who Sinead Tinker (Katie McGlynn) encountered at a massage parlour. Sinead, who was suffering from cervical cancer and undergoing chemotherapy at the time, was persuaded by Steff, who had breast cancer, to dodge the treatment in favour of an alkaline diet. They became good friends and Sinead took her advice, but when Steff died after her cancer returned, Sinead immediately went back on the treatment. Even though they were once friends, Sinead grew to hate Steff once her own cancer returned in September 2019, as if she had not listened to Steff, she may not have developed terminal cancer. |
| 5 December – 5 July 2021 | Jo Lafoe | Marnie Baxter | A client of Underworld who regularly orders stock from them. |
