= Kate Oates =

British television producer (born 1979/80)

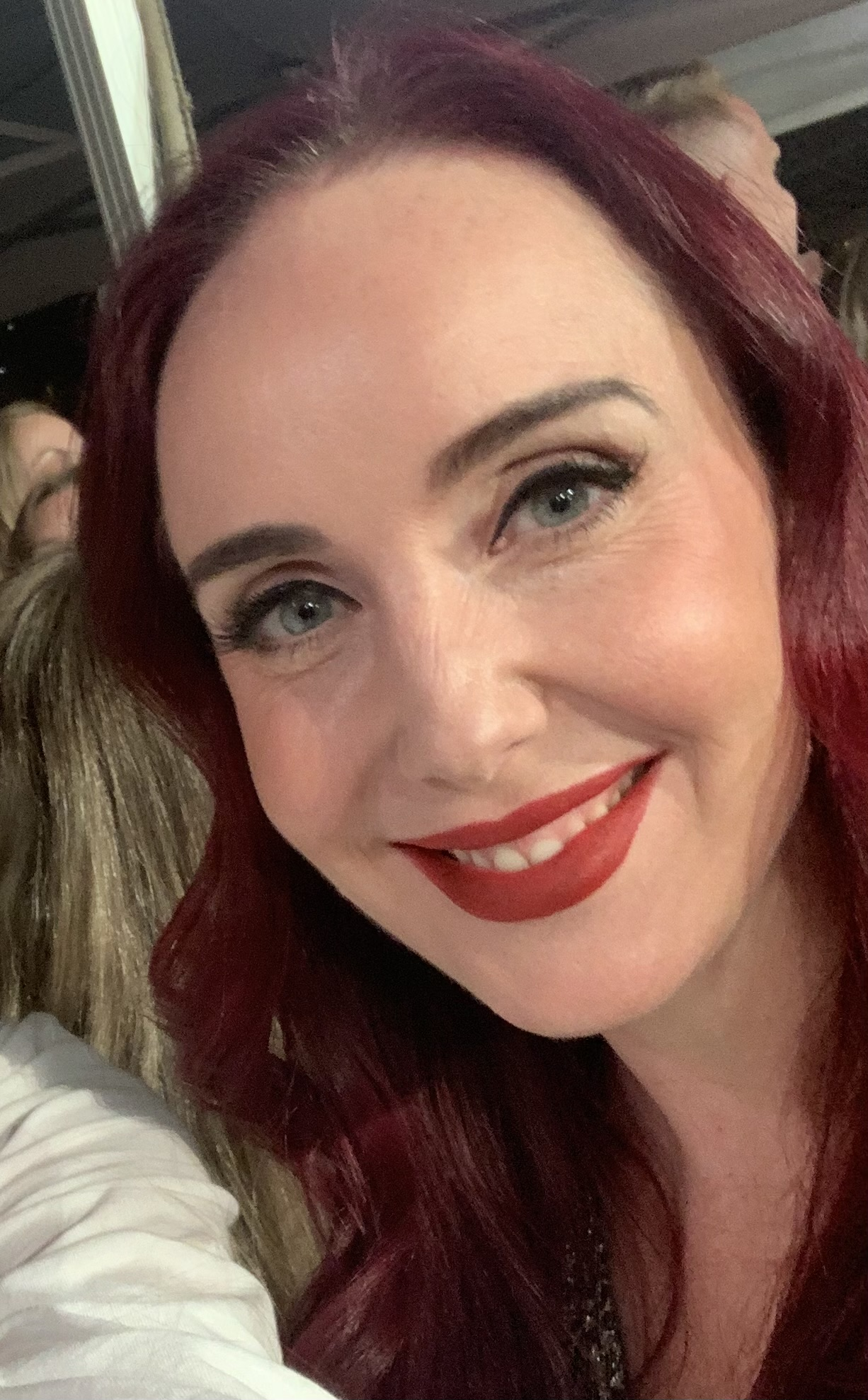
- Oates in 2022
- Born: 1979/1980; Nottingham, England
- Education: Warwick University
- Occupations: Television producer, researcher, story editor
- Years active: 2003–present

Kate Oates (born 1979/1980) is a British television producer, who was born in Nottingham and graduated from Warwick University. She began her career working as a researcher and editorial assistant for Germaine Greer, before becoming a script editor for the soap opera Crossroads. In 2003, she joined the radio soap The Archers as a producer, a position which Oates credits as the majority of her training. After resigning from this job, Oates began working on the ITV soap opera Emmerdale as a script editor, during which time she assisted with the soap's fortieth anniversary celebrations and worked on British Soap Award-winning storylines. She remained in the position until 2012 when she joined Coronation Street as the assistant producer.

In October 2012, Oates was announced as the series producer of Emmerdale, a position she began three months later. As series producer, Oates oversaw a surge in the popularity of the programme. Her duration at Emmerdale received positive acclaim from critics of the genre. She resigned from the show and left in December 2015. After leaving Emmerdale, Oates transferred to Coronation Street as the series producer, a move which was praised by ITV personnel. While in the position, the show's ratings and critical acclaim increased, although Oates' darker storylines received mixed critical response and led to the soap being reported to Ofcom for the inclusion of violent imagery during the pre-watershed time frame. Oates announced her resignation from Coronation Street in April 2018, where it was announced that she would join production company Tall Story Pictures producing series 2 of Bancroft.

Oates' hiring by the BBC as the senior executive producer of EastEnders, Casualty and Holby City was announced in August 2018. With the announcement came praise from multiple personnel of the BBC, including the BBC's director of content, Charlotte Moore. Oates' primary responsibility in the position is her work on EastEnders as executive producer. She was later promoted to Head of Continuing Drama at BBC Studios in 2019, overseeing six BBC soap operas and dramas, remaining in creative control of EastEnders.

== Early life ==
Oates was born in Nottingham, England. She attended Ockbrook School and Warwick University, where she graduated with an English and Theatre degree. Actress Rosie Marcel revealed in a December 2019 interview with the Metro that Oates used to be a Samaritan.

== Career ==
=== Early work ===
Oates begun her career as a researcher and editorial assistant for writer Germaine Greer and credited Greer as "inspiring", "inimitable", "kind" and "enthusiastic". She moved to Carlton Television as a researcher and script editor for soap opera, Crossroads, which she continued until 2003. Crossroads was cancelled in March 2003, with the final episode airing in May. Oates' work on Crossroads lead her to begin producing BBC Radio 4 soap opera, The Archers, a place which she credits as the "bulk of her training". In 2012, Oates praised The Archers's editor of twenty-one years, Vanessa Whitburn, calling her "inspiring". Oates produced the soap opera for seven years, choosing to leave in 2010.

=== Emmerdale ===
Oates began working on the ITV soap opera Emmerdale in early 2010 as a story editor, under then-producer, Gavin Blyth. Oates edited various storylines for the show, including Aaron Livesy (Danny Miller) assisting the suicide of his boyfriend, Jackson Walsh (Marc Silcock), which won the British Soap Award for Best Storyline in 2012. Oates held a key role in the soap's fortieth anniversary celebrations and said that she was "proud" to be involved. Oates left her position at Emmerdale in 2012, having worked on the show for two and a half years. Reflecting on Oates' work on the show as story editor, John Whiston, the creative director of ITV soaps, commented, "Kate swept into Emmerdale a couple of years ago with a deadly combination of determination and brio. She soon proved her worth to the show, working on stories that ranged from the extremely tough to the light and funny."

==== As series producer ====
"I'm delighted to be Emmerdale's new producer as I'm passionate about the programme and everyone who works on the show. [...] I feel very lucky to be returning to such a wonderfully successful show. I'm in awe of the cast, crew and writing team and it's a privilege to be renewing my working relationship with everyone."

— Oates on becoming the series producer of Emmerdale. (2012)

On 15 October 2012, Oates was announced to be succeeding Stuart Blackburn as the series producer of Emmerdale. Having left the soap earlier that year, Oates explained that she did not expect to return to the show as quickly as she did. She started in the position in January 2013. Oates reports to Whiston, who believed that she was "in tune with the vibrant spirit of modern Emmerdale". He also thought that Oates would be able to maintain that over the coming years. Oates was first credited for the position in episode 6518/6519, first broadcast on 4 April 2013, alongside Blackburn, and was first sole credited in episode 6522, first broadcast on 9 April.

Oates focused on major storylines such as Brenda Walker's (Lesley Dunlop) brain tumour, Cameron Murray's (Dominic Power) killing spree and Rhona Goskirk's (Zoe Henry) painkiller addiction. She felt that it was best to focus on the storytelling and to make Emmerdale popular. Cameron's killing spree culminated in a siege set in The Woolpack pub, a central location of the series. The siege won the Spectacular Scene of the Year award at the 2014 British Soap Awards. During her time at Emmerdale, Oates introduced many well publicised storylines, including Donna Windsor's (Verity Rushworth) "heart-wrenching" battle with terminal cancer, Laurel Thomas' (Charlotte Bellamy) "dark" alcoholism story, Aaron Livesy's "tear-jerking" and "tragic" revelation that he was sexually abused by his father as a child, a week of episodes involving a helicopter crash and the deaths of two regular characters, as well as the popular pairing of Robert Sugden (Ryan Hawley) and Aaron Livesy, which Duncan Lindsay of the Metro opined had "defined" her era.

Oates introduced multiple major characters to the soap. One of her first casting choices included extending the established Barton family to include the brother-in-law and nephews of Moira Barton (Natalie J. Robb). The family was expanded again in 2015 through the introduction of Emma Barton (Gillian Kearney). Oates also created the White family, a new leading family for Home Farm manor, an "iconic" location in the show. She reintroduced the character of Robert Sugden with the family, although recast the role to actor Ryan Hawley. Oates introduced multiple other leading characters to the soap as well. She also reintroduced former characters Leyla Harding (Roxy Shahidi), Donna Windsor (Rushworth), Aaron Livesy (Miller) and Douglas Potts (Duncan Preston) for regular stints, as well as Steph Stokes (Lorraine Chase), Paul Lambert (Matthew Bose) and Nikhil Sharma (Rik Makarem) for guest stints. She also recast and reintroduced multiple former characters.

On 18 September 2015, it was announced that Oates would leave Emmerdale. She praised the soap and said that she had enjoyed her time as series producer. John Whiston praised Oates' work on the show, opining that she had made Emmerdale popular again and given it an "on-going resurgence". He added, "She has that rare combination, a sharp editorial eye for a compelling story together with deep understanding of what drives characters caught up in such drama." He felt these elements allowed her to improve Emmerdale without losing any of the soap's "credibility or humour". Oates left the show in December 2015, and was last credited in episode 7503, first broadcast on 16 May 2016.

=== Coronation Street ===
In 2012, Oates joined ITV soap opera Coronation Street as the assistant producer. Kieran Roberts, the executive producer of the soap, said that as the assistant producer, she made a "huge impact". Whiston said that many people were impressed with her "inspiration and sheer hard work" during her time on the soap, which would help her in the future. Oates was first credited as assistant producer in episode 7951, first broadcast on 10 September 2012, and last credited in episode 8083, first broadcast on 15 March 2013.

Oates' appointment as the series producer of Coronation Street, succeeding Blackburn, was announced on 18 September 2015. Oates was delighted to join the soap, describing the move as "exiciting" and adding that she felt honoured to do so. Oates joined the soap in early 2016. On the move from Emmerdale to Coronation Street, she commented, "But as much as Emmerdale has meant the world to me Corrie [sic] also has a special place in my heart." John Whiston felt that Oates was the perfect person to become the series producer of the soap. Blackburn described the position as "one of the best jobs in television" and wished Oates luck. Roberts opined that Oates would make an "ideal" producer for the series and believed that she had "all the qualities to be a big success as producer of Coronation Street". Mark Jefferies of Daily Mirror thought that Oates would be the "Coronation Street saviour". Oates was first credited in the position in episode 8968, first broadcast on 15 August 2016.

Upon her appointment, Oates developed the established Barlow family through the reintroductions of Peter Barlow (Chris Gascoyne), Adam Barlow (Sam Robertson) and Daniel Osbourne (Rob Mallard). She also reintroduced Toyah Battersby (Georgia Taylor), following a 14-year absence, Rosie Webster (Helen Flanagan), Brian Packham (Peter Gunn) and Carla Connor (Alison King). Oates also oversaw the soap's move from transmitting five episodes per week to six episodes per week. Following reports of upset within the show's cast and crew over the increase in episodes, Oates denied the claims and said that the production team were working together to ensure that "the show is in a great place for when we go to six a week".

At a show press event, Oates explained that she wanted to introduce a "greater breadth of storylines" and use more of the soap's talented cast. She added, "In terms of pacing, I do like things to move and develop, but you also need to let the right moments breathe." Oates introduced major plots, including Pat Phelan's (Connor McIntyre) "grisly" reign of terror, which spanned the entirety of Oates' tenure, that saw the departures of Andy Carver (Oliver Farnworth) and Luke Britton (Dean Fagan). Michelle Connor (Kym Marsh) and Steve McDonald's (Simon Gregson) "devastating" late miscarriage, Ken Barlow's (William Roache) stroke and attempted murder, Bethany Platt's (Lucy Fallon) "brave and dark" sexual exploitation story, David Platt's (Jack P. Shepherd) "controversial" rape at the hands of Josh Tucker (Ryan Clayton), and Aidan Connor's (Shayne Ward) "haunting" suicide. Oates has been praised for creating higher ratings for the show. Daniel Kilkelly and Rianne Houghton of Digital Spy dubbed Oates' tenure as "divisive".

"Kate Oates has transformed Coronation Street during her tenure. This has been reflected both in the huge critical acclaim the show has been getting and in the ratings. We are now used to opening the overnights and seeing Coronation Street has delivered its highest ratings for many years, a herculean achievement in this box set era."

— John Whiston on Oates' time as the series producer of Coronation Street. (2018)

On 24 April 2018, it was announced that Oates had resigned from her position as series producer of Coronation Street after two years. Oates called her time on the show "one of the best experiences of my life". She said that she was proud of her storylines and the impact they made. She added, "I've had a ball working with one of the best and most talented teams in television. I'll be forever grateful for this opportunity and all it has given me". Whiston praised Oates' work and said that she "transformed" the soap opera, creating much positive publicity. He commended her "groundbreaking and socially important stories", including Pat Phelan's villainous spree and the light-hearted humour between characters. On the storylines, he said, "It is a testament to her brilliant editorial touch that these stories, though difficult, have been both credible and engaging." He added that the movement from five to six episodes was "a phenomenal achievement" for Oates and said that the increase in ratings was "a herculean achievement in this box set era."

Iain MacLeod, the producer of Emmerdale, was announced as Oates' successor. He described Oates as "an extraordinarily talented woman – very intelligent, very capable and a very good storyteller". MacLeod confirmed that Oates had prepared storylines for Coronation Street until November 2018, so she would be credited until early December. Oates' final episode of the soap is episode 9635, first broadcast on 10 December 2018.

=== Tall Story Pictures ===
After leaving Coronation Street, Oates was announced to be joining Tall Story Pictures, a company owned by ITV Studios. It was confirmed that Oates would produce the second series of ITV drama Bancroft. Oates looked forward to starting her new position and working on the production of Bancroft.

=== BBC ===
In August 2018, it was announced that Oates would become the senior executive producer of EastEnders as well as BBC medical dramas Casualty and Holby City. Initially, Oates primarily worked with the team at EastEnders alongside the show's executive consultant, John Yorke from October to December 2018 to provide a "smooth handover". From then on, Oates was to gain sole responsibility for the show. Oates relished in the chance to be involved in the production of the three shows. She commented, "I'm excited about meeting the teams and talent behind each show and can't wait to get stuck in and tell some unmissable stories." Mark Linsey, the CCO of BBC Studios, called Oates a "dynamic, passionate and creative storyteller" and looked forward to her joining the studios. Charlotte Moore was pleased with Oates' appointment and said in a press release, "she has a real passion for soaps and I have no doubt that her experience, creative flair and dynamism will excite the next generation of BBC One soap fans." Piers Wenger, the controller of BBC Drama, opined that Oates had an "unrivalled" ability to make soaps and continuing dramas popular and "talked about". He predicted that she would be "brilliant" in her new position.

In September 2018, Oates spoke to Duncan Lindsay of the Metro about her plans for EastEnders. She explained that she wants to make the soap "the very best it can be", although pointed out that this would be challenging. Oates told the reporter that she already had ideas about the show and knew which characters she could utilise well, but wanted to speak to the cast and crew and find out their ideas before implementing anything new. She added that she had recently been researching the history of EastEnders in preparation for joining the soap. Oates confirmed that she did not want to write out multiple characters as she believed that it would not benefit the spirit of the show. One of Oates' first responsibilities was to hire an executive producer for EastEnders. Jon Sen was later chosen for the position. Oates' first credited episode as senior executive producer on EastEnders is episode 5872, originally broadcast on 21 February 2019.

In April 2019, it was announced that Oates had been promoted to Head of Continuing Drama at BBC Studios, succeeding Oliver Kent. Under the position, she is responsible for the leadership of six BBC soaps and dramas: EastEnders, Casualty, Holby City, Doctors, River City and Pobol y Cwm. Oates continues to be based at the filming studios of EastEnders, BBC Elstree Centre, and works closely with their production team. Oates expressed her excitement at being promoted and working with three new soap operas. She stated that she found it demanding to keep viewers "consistently engaged with brilliant stories that feel fresh and exciting". She added that she was enjoying work with the production teams of EastEnders, Casualty and Holby City already. Ralph Lee, the director of content at BBC Studios, praised Oates, branding her "an exceptional talent". He observed, "Kate's passion and creativity is already making a real difference and she can now apply her exciting vision to the full portfolio of our continuing dramas."

Media offices
Preceded by Stuart Blackburn	Series producer of Emmerdale; 2013−2016	Succeeded by Iain MacLeod
Preceded by Stuart Blackburn	Series producer of Coronation Street; 2016−2018	Succeeded by Iain MacLeod
New title	Senior executive producer of EastEnders, Casualty and Holby City; 2018−2019	Defunct title
Preceded by Oliver Kent	Head of Continuing Drama, BBC Studios; 2019−present	Incumbent
