= The Last Czars =

English-language docudrama on Netflix

- Genre: Docudrama
- Starring: Robert Jack; Susanna Herbert; Bernice Stegers; Ben Cartwright
- Country of origin: United States
- Original language: English
- No. of seasons: 1
- No. of episodes: 6

Production
- Executive producer: Jane Root
- Production locations: Vilnius, Rumšiškės
- Running time: 42–50 minutes
- Production company: Nutopia

Original release
- Network: Netflix
- Release: July 3, 2019

The Last Czars is a six-part English-language docudrama that premiered on Netflix on July 3, 2019. The series follows the reign of Nicholas II, the last emperor of Russia's Romanov Dynasty, from his accession to the throne in 1894 to his execution along with the Romanov family in 1918.

== Cast ==
- Robert Jack as Czar Nicholas II
- Susanna Herbert as Czarina Alexandra Feodorovna
- Ben Cartwright as Grigori Rasputin
- Oliver Dimsdale as Pierre Gilliard
- Bernice Stegers as Dowager Czarina Maria Feodorovna
- Gerard Miller as Prince Yusupov
- Steffan Boje as Dr. Schmidt
- Indre Patkauskaite as Ana Anderson
- Elsie Bennett as Grand Duchess Elizabeth Feodorovna
- Jurga Seduikyte as Militsa
- Duncan Pow as Yurovsky
- Karina Stungyte as Grand Duchess Stana Nikolaevna
- Milda Noreikaite as Grand Duchess Militza Nikolaevna
- Michelle Bonnard as Praskovya
- Gavin Mitchell as Grand Duke Sergei Alexandrovich of Russia
- Karolina Elzbieta Mikolajunaite as Grand Duchess Olga Nikolaevna
- Aina Norgilaite as Grand Duchess Tatiana Nikolaevna
- Gabija Pazusyte as Grand Duchess Anastasia Nikolaevna
- Digna Kulionyte as Grand Duchess Maria Nikolaevna
- Oskar Mowdy as Tsarevich Alexei
- Milda Noreikaite as Shura

== Episodes ==
No.	Title	Original release date
1	"The Chosen One"	July 3, 2019
Alexander III of Russia dies unexpectedly at the age of 49 in 1894, paving way for his son, Nicholas II, succeeding him at the age of 26. He vows to continue the same autocratic control over Russia as his father, but his coronation is marked by mass deaths during the festivities. He and his wife, Alix of Hesse, struggle to conceive a son to one day become the heir to the throne. In Siberia, Grigori Rasputin sets out on a pilgrimage, and impresses a family by healing an old man. Rasputin is said to be an adherent of the heterodox known as Khlysty. In 1925, seven years after the Romanov family’s death, their former tutor, Pierre Gilliard, visits a mental hospital in Berlin, where a woman claiming to be Anastasia is hospitalised. He is suspicious to how she allegedly survived the family’s assassination.
2	"The Boy"	July 3, 2019
Nicholas leads Russia into war with Japan, despite his political advisors arguing against it. On July 30, 1904, Alix gives birth to their son Alexei, but they soon discover that he’s suffering from haemophilia, which they keep from the public. Bloody Sunday (1905) happens in January 1905. In February 1905, Nicholas’ uncle Grand Duke Sergei Alexandrovich is assassinated by Ivan Kalyayev during the 1905 Russian Revolution. Suffering massive losses in the war with Japan, and with unrest at home, Nicholas and his family find sanctuary outside of St. Petersburg. One of his advisors recommends him to establish a Duma as a concession to the people, despite his reservations. Rasputin arrives in the city and impresses the “black princesses” with his sympathy and understanding of a grieving woman. Initially uncertain of Rasputin’s abilities, Nicholas subsequently calls on him to tend to his son.
3	"Anarchy"	July 3, 2019
In 1925, Gilliard deduces that the woman in Berlin who claims to be Anastasia is an imposter. He also recounts that he only met Rasputin once during his time with the Romanov family. With Rasputin’s influence growing, he starts a sex cult and is alleged to have had affairs and seduced many women. Prime minister Pyotr Stolypin is witness to Rasputin’s unusual tactics first hand by his own daughter. He recommends Nicholas to send him away from St. Petersburg and has the police gather information on Rasputin. Nicholas is however not swayed, calling the allegations against Rasputin, lies. Stolypin and the czar also clash over further concessions to the people. Stolypin warns Rasputin personally and warns that he will be arrested if he doesn’t leave. The church’s efforts to dampen Rasputin also fails. In September 1911, Stolypin is assassinated at the Kiev Opera. Bishop Germogen leaks Rasputin’s private letters to the public, causing a stir. Nicholas finally sends Rasputin back to Siberia. In September 1912, he returns shortly after Alexei hurts himself and starts to bleed.
4	"War"	July 3, 2019
Gilliard’s wife arrives in Berlin to help him with the woman who claims to be Anastasia. She notably presents the woman with jewelry which the empress gave her and looks for a swell on her foot. In June 1914, Archduke Franz Ferdinand of Austria-Hungary is assassinated in Sarajevo and the country declares war against Serbia, supported by Germany. Nicholas is unbalanced by advice to declare war by Grand Duke Nicholas Nikolaevich or don’t by both his wife and Rasputin. He subsequently chooses the former and puts Nikolaevich in command. Back home in Pokrovskoye, Rasputin is stabbed by Chionya Guseva, during which time he becomes a decisive figure in society. By 1915, Nicholas takes over command of the war and heads to the front, placing Alix and Rasputin in charge in St. Petersburg. While drinking in a bar, Rasputin boasts about his influence over Alix, which states public rumours that they’re having a sexual relationship. With Rasputin becoming unpopular among politicians and the public alike, Nicholas is stuck between listening to them or his wife who wants to keep Rasputin. In December 1916, Felix Yusupov invites Rasputin to talk about an issue, where he gets drunk. Yusupov comes back with a revolver and shoots him. Rasputin unexpectedly wakes up again and escapes outside, where he stumbles on the ground. He is shot another time, this one fatal.
5	"Revolution"	July 3, 2019
In Berlin 1925, Gilliard enlists the help of the children’s aunt, Olga, to visit the woman who claims to be Anastasia. In 1916, following the death of Rasputin, Nicholas decides to head to the Eastern front and puts his wife Aleksandra temporarily in charge of the country. Just after his departure, strikes erupt in Petrograd that escalate into mass protests. They are later joined by sympathetic soldiers and march towards the palace. At the war’s frontline, soldiers desert the war effort and join the Russian Revolution. Worried about his family, Nicholas hastily returns. On the way there, realising he has lost control of the country, he abdicates the throne. Alexander Kerensky is put in charge of a provisional government and moves the family to protect them from the extremist protesters. However, his government is overthrown a few months later, paving the way for Vladimir Lenin and the Bolsheviks. In 1918, Yakov Yurovsky is put in charge of moving the family to a safe house within Bolshevik territory.
6	"The House of Special Purpose"	July 3, 2019
The Romanovs are moved to the Ipatiev House in Yekaterinburg, and are guarded and set on a daily schedule to uphold during their stay. Lenin’s Bolshevik rule is put under fire when lose fraction groups split and cause the Russian Civil War. The White Army gets the upper hand and make their way to Yekaterinburg. Yurovsky is personally put in charge of the house’s security after it’s deemed compromised after one of the girls becomes intimate with one of the guards. With the White Army nearing the city, Yurovsky is ordered to move the family, but is in reality preparing to execute them. They are brought to the basement, where he sentences them to death and a firing squad executes them. Remaining family members of the Romanov’s escape the country, while 18 of them are executed. In 1925, Gilliard uncovers evidence of Anna Anderson being the woman claiming to be Anastasia. Following the family’s execution, he visited the house personally. Anderson would for many decades uphold her claim to be Anastasia. In 1979, the family’s remains are uncovered and officially confirmed three years later. In 1998, President Boris Yeltsin orders a re-burial of the family’s remains, although two bodies are missing. They are of Alexei and Maria, whose remains are finally discovered in 2007. However, their remains have yet to be buried to this day. Prince Philip, Duke of Edinburgh gave blood to enable DNA testing since he was from the House of Glücksburg which is the same royal house to which the mother of Nicholas II Maria belonged.

== Reception ==
On the review aggregation website Rotten Tomatoes, the series has an approval rating of 60% with an average rating of 6/10, based on 10 reviews.

The series was described by The Guardian as "a surreal Wikipedia entry brought to life", in a review which pointed out production errors such as a bottle with the word “vodka” misspelled in Cyrillic, and a shot of Red Square, supposedly in 1905, featuring Lenin's Mausoleum which was not built until 1924.
