= Eve (British TV series) =

British children's science fiction series

- Title card
- Genre: Children's; Comedy drama; Sci-fi
- Created by: Emma Reeves; David Chikwe
- Directed by: Adrian McDonwall; Jonathan Fox Bassett; Adrian Mead
- Starring: Poppy Lee Friar; Oliver Woollford; Eubha Akilade; Ben Cartwright; Rhona Croker; Elijah Ayitè; Rory Barraclough; Jane Asher
- Theme music composer: Philip Curran
- Composer: Philip Curran
- Country of origin: United Kingdom
- Original language: English
- No. of series: 3
- No. of episodes: 35 (1 special) (List of episodes)

Production
- Executive producers: Ruth Caleb; Sue Nott
- Producers: Peter Gallagher; Jeremy Swimer; Wendy Griffin; David Chikwe
- Editors: Scott McCartney; Ben McKinstrie
- Camera setup: Multi-camera
- Running time: 28 minutes
- Production companies: Leopard Drama; Argonon

Original release
- Network: CBBC
- Release: 5 January 2015 – 14 December 2016

Eve is a British children's science fiction series starring Poppy Lee Friar that follows the adventures of a gynoid, a female android, named Eve (also known as Project Eternity) living with a family in suburbia, trying to make sense of human life as a teenage girl. Written by children's writer Emma Reeves, Eve was co-created with David Chikwe, creative director of Blacklisted Films.

Eve launched on CBBC on 5 January 2015 with its 13-episode first series occupying a Monday afternoon slot in the channel's schedule. This was later followed by special airing on Christmas Day 2015. A 12-episode second series followed in 2016. The third series was first confirmed by a post on Poppy Lee Friar's Instagram account and began airing on 19 October 2016 and concluded on 14 December 2016.

== Cast ==
=== Main ===
- Poppy Lee Friar as Eve, the main protagonist of the series. Eve is a newly-awakened gynoid whose appearance is based on Helen, the deceased twin sister of Eve’s “mother”, Mary Douglas, as she appeared during the 1970s. In public she assumes the guise of Will's cousin from the United States. Eve is socially inept and often unaware of the many dangers she often finds herself in, but with help from her adopted family she learns to pass for a human and decide her own course.
- Oliver Woollford as Will Clarke, a teenage boy who awakened Eve and Dr. Clarke's son. He develops a strong relationship with Eve and holds a fierce desire to protect her, even at the cost of his own safety though his stubbornness often brings him into conflict with his family and friends.
- Eubha Akilade as Lily Watson, a genius teenage girl and socially awkward hacker who is Will's best friend. She also forms a close friendship with Eve and despite occasional jealousy, is both fascinated by and protective of the often ignorant gynoid.
- Elijah Ayité as Abe Watson, Lily's acquisitive little brother who affectionately refers to Eve as "Robo Girl". Though a constant annoyance to Will and Lily and largely unaware or uninterested in ethics or empathy, he actually cares deeply for Eve and maintains a moral code.
- Ben Cartwright as Dr. Nick Clarke
- Rhona Croker as Dr. Katherine Calvin, the central antagonist of the first season; a brilliant but highly contemptuous and ambitious scientist and manager of Calimov Systems. She usually holds Nick and his family in little regard.
- Jane Asher as Mary Douglas, the transhumanist main antagonist of the series and Eve's creator. She believes humans are good only for death and destruction and thus seeks to replace them with a species of artificial intelligence that will eventually shape the future of the entire universe.

=== Recurring ===
- Shonagh Price as Maddy Watson
- Richie Campbell as Viv Watson
- Jenny Bede as Rebecca Clarke
- Ellie Grainger as KT
- Alex Sawyer as Michael Hoffman
- Michael Wildman as Lord Hoffman
- Peter Collins as Mr Gwenlan
- Rory Barraclough as Chris
- Paksie Vernon as Laurie
- Chris Hegarty as Cain
- Billy Ashworth as Zac and Adam

== Episodes ==
Series	Episodes	Originally released	
Series	Episodes	First released	Last released
1	13	5 January 2015	11 April 2015
2	12	4 January 2016	21 March 2016
3	9	26 October 2016	14 December 2016
Special		25 December 2015	

== Awards and nominations ==
Ceremony	Award	Nominee	Result
2015 British Academy Children's Awards	Children's Performer in 2015	Poppy Lee Friar	Nominated
2015 London Screenwriters’ Festival: British Screenwriters Awards	Best British Children's Television	Emma Reeves, Andrew Yerlett, Joe Williams, Ann Marie Di Mambro, Vivien Adam and Kirstie Swain	Nominated
2016 Writers' Guild of Great Britain Awards	Best Children's TV Episode	Emma Reeves for "Control, Alter, Delete"	Won
2016 Broadcast Awards	Best Children's Programme	Eve	Shortlisted
2016 Televisual Bulldog Awards	Best Children's Programme	Eve	Nominated
2016 Royal Television Society Scotland Awards	Best Children's Programme	Eve	Won
2016 Royal Television Society Scotland Awards	Best Sound	John Cobban / 422.tv	Won
