= Knightswood Secondary School =

Coordinates: 55°53′22.43″N 4°20′17.63″W

Knightswood Secondary School (Incorporating The Dance School of Scotland)

Location
- Knightswood Road; Glasgow, City of Glasgow, G13 2XD; Scotland

Information
- Type: State Funded, Secondary
- Motto: Fidelis (Faithful)
- Religious affiliation: Non-denominational
- Established: 10 October 1958
- Local authority: Glasgow City Council
- Head teacher: Maura McNeil
- Staff: c.110
- Gender: Co-educational
- Age range: 11 to 18
- Enrollment: c.1200 pupils
- Language: English
- Website: Knightswood Secondary School; The Dance School of Scotland

Knightswood Secondary School is a secondary school located in Knightswood in the west-end of Glasgow, Scotland.

The school has a roll of approximately 1200 pupils. Knightswood is co-educational, non-selective and non-denominational, and provides education for pupils of varying backgrounds. Knightswood also contains The Dance School Of Scotland, which opened in 1984.

== Management ==
As well as a headteacher and deputy headteacher, each school year has an assistant head teacher, who is able to have a more personal contact with students. The offices of the headteacher, deputy head and assistant heads are all held in one corridor located on the ground floor.

Guidance (known as pastoral care) teachers are assigned by registration classes. There are typically twelve guidance counsellors in one school year.

== Layout and structure ==
Knightswood was the first school designed by the modernist architects Gillespie, Kidd & Coia. Designed in 1938, it was not built until the 1950s, being opened on 10 October 1958 by John Maclay, Secretary of State for Scotland. It is now protected as a category B listed building. Knightswood contains four floors, as well as three annexes.

== The Dance School of Scotland ==
Knightswood Secondary is affiliated with The Dance School of Scotland, a centre of excellence for vocational dance and musical theatre fully funded by the Scottish Government and opened in 1983. The Dance School incorporated into the main school to allow Dance and Musical Theatre pupils to have both their academic and vocational needs fulfilled.

Potential pupils audition in the spring/summer and start classes the following school year, if they receive a placement. The Dance course can be auditioned for from S1 and upward. The Preparatory Theatre course for musical theatre can be auditioned for in preparation for S3, and the Musical Theatre for S5/S6. Students are assessed throughout the year and progression through the school is dependent on their assessment grades.

Pupils go to the main building for academic lessons and have class with mainstream students. For subjects deemed not entirely necessary to their education, they return to the dance school and receive vocational training instead. Students in the Dance course study modern, jazz, national, tap and contemporary, with a primary focus on ballet. Musical Theatre and Preparatory Theatre receive tuition in dancing, singing, acting, and performance skills. The Musical Theatre Showcase is performed in November and a fully staged musical is performed (usually at The Citizen's Theatre, Glasgow) in June. The Dance Course's Showcase is performed in June (usually at The Theatre Royal, The King's Theatre or The Glasgow Royal Concert Hall)

If accepted pupils live too far away to travel from home on a daily basis, they can be offered a place at the school's nearby residential building to stay in during the week. Students stay in the residence from Sunday to Thursday inclusive. The residence is shared with students from the Music School of Douglas Academy.

An Open Day for the Dance School School of Scotland is usually held in November.

== Notable alumni ==
- Moyo Akandé, actress
- John Fleck, football player
- Jamie Murphy, football player
- Alan Rough, football goalkeeper
- Sharon Rooney, actress
- Bill Forsyth, director
- Eubha Akilade, actress and dancer
- Mirren Mack, actress
- Gary Maclean, chef
- John Bennett, businessman and chairman of Rangers Football Club
- Gayle Rankin, actress (GLOW, The Listeners), attended The Dance School of Scotland
- Dawn Sievewright, actress
