= Michelle Bonnard =

British/ Seychellois actress

Michelle Bonnard (born 14 September 1980) is a British /Seychellois actress, writer and director. She attended the Central Junior Television Workshop before studying at LAMDA.

== Career ==
Michelle Bonnard has worked in television, theatre and film. She first came to prominence playing Helena in the BBC's 2005 adaptation of A Midsummer Night's Dream, called ShakespeaRe-Told. Other roles include DCI Goodchild in The Fear for Channel 4 starring Peter Mullan, press officer Tops in BBC/HBO drama Five Days (Golden Globe and BAFTA nominated), Raghad Hussein in Channel 4’s Saddam's Tribe and Stephanie Blake in Law and Order UK.

Stage appearances include The Quiet House at Park Theatre (nomination for 2016 Offie for Best Actress), A Wolf in Snakeskin Shoes at Tricycle Theatre directed by Indhu Rubasingham, Beasts and Beauties at Hampstead Theatre Melly Still, On The Record (Michael Longhurst), Macbeth (Max Stafford-Clark) and Europe (Douglas Rintoul) and The Mirror for Princes (Sulyman Al Bassam) (both at the Barbican Theatre).

== Filmography ==
=== Film ===
Year	Title	Role	Notes
2018	Ray & Liz	Zeinab	

=== Television ===
Year	Title	Role	Notes
1995	Backup	Elaine	Episode: "Badlands"
1998	Bernard's Watch	Mel	Episode: "Old Time"
1998	Dangerfield	First Nurse	Episode: "Double Helix"
2004	EastEnders	Trish	Episode dated 11 May 2004
2004–2010	Casualty	Various roles	5 episodes
2004–2015	Doctors	Various roles	10 episodes
2005	Spooks	Delphine Lapin	Episode: "The Special: Part 1"
2005	ShakespeaRe-Told	Helena	Episode: "A Midsummer Night's Dream"
2006	Eleventh Hour	Junior Doctor	Episode: "Resurrection"
2007	Five Days	Tops	5 episodes
2007	Saddam's Tribe: Bound by Blood	Raghad	Television film
2007	My Boyfriend, the Sex Tourist	Narrator	Television film
2008	Waking the Dead	Dr Emma McKenna	2 episodes
2008	Silent Witness	Kez	Episode: "Terror: Part 2"
2008	Apparitions	Sandra Tellor	Episode #1.3
2009	Margot	Sally	Television film
2010	Law & Order: UK	Stephanie Blake	Episode: "Anonymous"
2011	Hustle	Secretary	Episode: "Silent Witness"
2012	The Fear	Janice Goodchild	3 episodes
2013	Holby City	Julie Horton	Episode: "Not Aaron"
2013	Blackout	Nurse Gabby	Television film
2017	Inspector George Gently	Liz Paton	Episode: "Gently and the New Age"
2018	Strike	Hazel Furley	Episode: "Career of Evil: Part 2"
2018–2021	Unforgotten	Sal	7 episodes
2019	The Last Czars	Praskovya	3 episodes
2022	We Hunt Together	Prof. Judy Hackwood	3 episodes
2022–present	House of the Dragon	Sylvi	8 episodes
