= Prince Andrew: The Musical =

2022 television musical

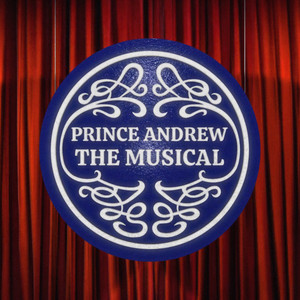
- Based on: The life of Prince Andrew
- Written by: Kieran Hodgson
- Starring: Kieran Hodgson; Emma Sidi; Munya Chawawa; Jenny Bede; Harry Enfield; Baga Chipz; Joe Wilkinson
- Composers: Kieran Hodgson; Freddie Tapner; Pippa Cleary
- Country of origin: United Kingdom
- Original language: English

Production
- Executive producers: Stu Mather; Jimmy Mulville
- Producer: Adam Reeve
- Running time: 60 minutes
- Production company: Hat Trick Productions

Original release
- Network: Channel 4
- Release: 29 December 2022

Prince Andrew: The Musical is a 2022 British made-for-television biographical musical comedy film written by and starring Kieran Hodgson. The musical is a "satirical send-up" of the life of the former Prince Andrew, and covers key events during his life, including his relationships, controversies, and his infamous 2019 interview with journalist Emily Maitlis.

The musical aired on Channel 4 on 29 December 2022 and also stars Emma Sidi as Maitlis, Munya Chawawa as Andrew's brother, the then Prince Charles, and Harry Enfield as former Prime Minister Tony Blair. It is part of the network's newly commissioned programmes to mark its 40th anniversary and was first announced in August 2022 at the Edinburgh International Television Festival. The show received mixed reviews from critics.

In November 2025, in light of the loss of Andrew's royal titles, Channel 4 announced that the musical would henceforth be rebranded on its streaming service as simply Andrew: The Musical (stylised as ~~Prince~~ Andrew: The Musical).

== Plot ==
The show begins with a recreation of Andrew's Newsnight interview with Emily Maitlis, interspersed with real footage. Once the interview is over, they each believe that they got the upper hand in the interview ("I Nailed It"). History then rewinds itself to 1982, when Andrew was growing up. As the programme's unreliable narrator, he reflects on how he was always more popular than his brother, Prince Charles, and that in a time of public anxiety over inflation and the Falklands War, he had been able to take advantage of not being the heir by crafting a more stylish and down-to-earth version of himself that the public swoons over ("England Expects").

At Royal Ascot 1985, Andrew makes a pass at Sarah Ferguson, whom he has not seen since childhood, and offers her a profiterole. In her mind, she unravels the metaphor of the profiterole representing the material luxury that Andrew could offer her in marriage, and accepts ("My Profiterole"). They get married, but the deterioration between Sarah and the media forces the two to separate, and eventually in the spring of 1996, Andrew divorces Sarah ("Will You Be My Ex Wife?").

In 2001, as he retires from the Royal Navy, Andrew accepts Prime Minister Tony Blair's offer of becoming a trade envoy, and when he believes that it would benefit his role to befriend the rich and influential, Ghislaine Maxwell introduces him to Jeffrey Epstein ("A Different Kind of Duty"). As Andrew's taxpayer-funded extravagance during his time as an envoy comes to light in 2010, along with the cash for access scandal, Prince Charles wishes that his brother would conform to the image that he wants to craft for the Royal Family in time for his accession to the throne ("Obey").

In the wake of the Newsnight interview, Charles confronts Andrew and tells him to withdraw from public life and return his military titles. Andrew is initially defiant, but after a news bulletin reveals to them both that he has just settled his lawsuit with Virginia Giuffre, Charles pressures him further. Andrew responds by insisting that in order to take media attention away from the wrongdoings of the rest of the royals, they need to keep him around as a scapegoat ("You're Always Gonna Need An Andrew"). As an unimpressed Charles leaves Andrew solitarily dancing, the screen fades to black and the cast perform a mock curtain call ("Bows & Credits").

== Cast ==
- Kieran Hodgson as Prince Andrew
- Emma Sidi as Emily Maitlis
- Munya Chawawa as Prince Charles
- Jenny Bede as Sarah Ferguson
- Harry Enfield as Tony Blair
- Baga Chipz as Margaret Thatcher
- Joe Wilkinson as newspaper vendor

== Musical numbers ==
Seven original musical numbers were created. All tracks have music by Kieran Hodgson, and lyrics by Hodgson and Freddie Tapner - both except where noted, ("Obey", Munya Chawawa, Pippa Cleary).

No.	Title	Lyrics	Music	Performer(s)	Length
1.	"I Nailed It"			Hodgson, Emma Sidi	3:40
2.	"England Expects"			Hodgson, Baga Chipz, Joe Wilkinson, Munya Chawawa	5:47
3.	"My Profiterole"			Jenny Bede	4:13
4.	"Will You Be My Ex Wife?"			Hodgson, Bede	4:56
5.	"A Different Kind of Duty"			Hodgson, Harry Enfield	4:01
6.	"Obey"	Chawawa	Pippa Cleary	Chawawa	3:52
7.	"You're Always Gonna Need An Andrew"			Hodgson, Chawawa	5:33
8.	"Bows & Credits"				1:32

== Orchestration ==
The music was recorded by the London Musical Theatre Orchestra in Angel Studios, conducted by Freddie Tapner. The 32-piece orchestra consisted of six woodwinds, two French horns, three trumpets, three trombones, drums, percussion, guitar, piano, bass, harp, 8 violins, 2 violas and 2 cellos. The orchestrations were by Simon Nathan.

== Release ==
=== Promotion ===
On 23 December 2022, the soundtrack album was released onto streaming services. The album cover, which shares the continuity logo seen within the show's television broadcast, is a visual parody of the PizzaExpress logo; this is a reference to Andrew's alibi that he was at the PizzaExpress in Woking on the day that he allegedly had sex with Virginia Giuffre.

On 29 December 2022, the day of the broadcast, a mobile billboard was placed outside the PizzaExpress in Woking to publicise the show - reading "If you miss it, you'd better have a decent alibi".

=== Broadcast ===
Prince Andrew: The Musical premiered on Channel 4 on 29 December 2022 at 9pm, and reran on 4seven later that evening.

On 17 April 2023, along with other royal related programming, a rebroadcast of Prince Andrew: The Musical was announced to feature as part of Channel 4's 'alternative' coronation coverage.

== Reception ==
The Birmingham Mail reported that social media postings gave mixed reviews of Prince Andrew: The Musical, with many finding the musical in poor taste.

Professional critical reviews were also mixed. In a positive review, giving the musical four stars, Tina Campbell for the Evening Standard said it was "certainly worth a watch" and called it "the satirical musical that nobody asked Father Christmas for, but what you're getting anyway is actually quite good". Playing on the name of the opening number, Carol Midgley for The Times said "this spoof nailed it", awarding three stars. Also awarding three stars, Anita Singh of The Telegraph said that it was "better than it has any right to be, thanks to some clever writing".

Lucy Mangan for The Guardian awarded three stars, but added that it "never quite flies" and that the Epstein scandal has been "played for laughs in a way that is not OK". One of the more outright negative reviews came from Alex Moreland of National World, awarding the musical only half a star, calling it "embarrassing" and a "contender for [the] worst [TV programme] of 2022". Louis Chilton for The Independent called the musical "tasteless", adding that it "should have never been made".
