= Mollie Winnard =

English actress

- Born: Mollie Louise Winnard; 14 March 1997 (age 29); Wigan, England
- Years active: 2017–present

Mollie Louise Winnard (born 14 March 1997) is an English actress. For her performance in the ITV soap opera Coronation Street (2018), she won an Inside Soap Award. She has since appeared in the Channel 5 series All Creatures Great and Small (2020–present), the BBC One crime drama Happy Valley (2023) and the BBC school drama Waterloo Road (2026).

== Early life ==
Winnard was born in Wigan on 14 March 1997. She grew up in Chorley, Lancashire. She started acting in a primary school production and joined a local youth theatre. Winnard attended Winstanley College in Wigan. She subsequently trained at the Manchester School of Acting.

== Career ==
Winnard made her television debut as Zoe in the 2017 BBC One drama Love, Lies and Records. The following year, she joined the cast of the long-running ITV soap opera Coronation Street as antagonist Kayla, a role she played from April to July 2018. Her performance won Best Bad Girl at the Inside Soap Awards.

In 2020, Winnard began playing the recurring character Maggie in the Channel 5 revival of All Creatures Great and Small. She appeared in the 2022 ITV true crime miniseries Four Lives as Demi. In 2023, Winnard joined the cast of the BBC One crime drama Happy Valley for its third series as Joanna Hepworth. In 2025, Winnard played the lead of Katurian in The Pillowman at a local am-dram theatre called Summerseat Players at the Theatre Royal in Ramsbottom. In 2026, it was announced that she had joined the cast of the BBC school drama series Waterloo Road as Gemma Tully, a newly qualified teacher. She will make her first on-screen appearance in its eighteenth series.

== Personal life ==
As of 2023, Winnard is in a relationship with DJ Jordan Murphy.

== Filmography ==
Year	Title	Role	Notes
2017	Love, Lies and Records	Zoe	2 episodes
2018	Coronation Street	Kayla Clifton	30 episodes
2020–present	All Creatures Great and Small	Maggie	18 episodes
2022	Four Lives	Demi	2 episodes (miniseries)
2023	Happy Valley	Joanna Hepworth	5 episodes (series 3)
2026	Silent Witness	DI Claire Ferris	2 episodes (series 29)
2026	Waterloo Road	Gemma Tully	Main role
2026	Apnas	Eleanor Elmsley	
