= Four Lives =

British serial killer drama

- Genre: Drama
- Created by: Neil McKay
- Starring: Stephen Merchant; Sheridan Smith
- Country of origin: United Kingdom
- Original language: English
- No. of series: 1
- No. of episodes: 3

Production
- Producers: Jeff Pope; Neil McKay; Serena Cullen; Carolyn Parry-Jones; Ken Horn

Original release
- Network: BBC One; BBC Two Wales
- Release: 3 January – 5 January 2022

Four Lives, originally and internationally titled The Barking Murders, is a British three-part television drama, first aired from 3 to 5 January 2022 on BBC One. It follows the true story of the families of four young gay men (Anthony Walgate, Gabriel Kovari, Daniel Whitworth and Jack Taylor) who in 2014 and 2015 were murdered by Stephen Port. Facing failings by the Metropolitan Police, they fought for justice for their loved ones. Stephen Merchant plays serial killer Port with Sheridan Smith as Sarah Sak, the mother of Anthony Walgate, Port's first victim.

== Production ==
First announced in early 2020, production on the show was halted due to the COVID-19 pandemic. The series was delayed twice after its announcement. On 13 December 2021 the official trailer was released with stills from the show being released on social media. During promotion for the series, Sheridan Smith said: "Every night I was going home in bits, crying – you can't help but take it home [...] I really beat myself up with it because I want to do a good job for them."

== Cast ==
- Stephen Merchant as Stephen Port
- Sheridan Smith as Sarah Sak
- Tim Preston as Anthony Walgate
- Jakub Svec as Gabriel Kovari
- Leo Flanagan as Daniel Whitworth
- Samuel Barnett as Ryan Edwards
- Paddy Rowan as Jack Taylor
- Robert Emms as Ricky
- Michael Jibson as DC Slaymaker
- Kris Hitchen as Tom
- Memet Ali Alabora as Sami Sak
- Daniel Ryan as Adam Whitworth
- Rufus Jones as John Pape
- Ian Puleston-Davies as Karl Turner MP
- Giselle Cullinane as Barbara Denham
- Ben Cartwright as Det. Sgt. O'Donnell
- Leanne Best as Kate
- Isabella Laughland as China
- Alexa Davies as Kiera
- Shaun Thomas as Paul
- Jack Pierce as Acting DI Rolf Schamberger
- Ella Kenion as Mandy Whitworth (Pearson)
- Jaime Winstone as Donna Taylor
- Stephanie Hyam as Jenny Taylor
- Holly Aird as Jeanette Taylor
- Tom Christian as DC Ian Atkinson
- Jason Done as a Barking Police Sergeant
- Mollie Winnard as Demi

== Episodes ==
No.	Title	Directed by	Written by	Original release date	UK viewers (millions) 7 day	UK viewers (millions) 28 day
1	"Episode 1"	David Blair	Neil McKay	3 January 2022	4.95	6.44
Two young men are found dead in Barking, London. The first, Anthony Walgate, is found outside the flat of Stephen Port. The police suggest the death may have been a drug overdose, but his friends in London and his family back in Hull are unconvinced. Walgate's mother thinks there is more to the case than the police are letting on and believes her son may have been murdered. Walgate's friends also reveal that Walgate was going to meet a man he met via a male escort website but was not heard from since, and they are frustrated that the police seem more interested in Walgate's sex life than the nature of his death. Port is arrested for perverting the course of justice, having lied to the police by claiming he didn't know Walgate before switching his story to claim the two had sex after Walgate had taken the drugs himself, but he is released on bail. The second victim, Gabriel Kovari from Slovakia, is found by a dog-walker in the graveyard of the nearby church. Kovari had moved into Port's flat but shortly before his death had confided to Port's neighbour that he found Port's behaviour intimidating.
2	"Episode 2"	David Blair	Neil McKay	4 January 2022	4.28	5.94
The body of a third victim, Daniel Whitworth, is discovered in the same graveyard by the same dog-walker. Again, the police suggest a deliberate drugs overdose, pointing to a suicide note found next to Whitworth's body which implies he knew Kovari and was responsible for Kovari's death, but Whitworth's partner and his family are all unconvinced, claiming that Whitworth didn't do drugs and that the tone and handwriting of the note are uncharacteristic. Kovari's friend and former landlord also conducts research of his own and is astonished to find what appear to be suspicious but obvious connections between the three deaths. He, the families of Whitworth and Walgate, and Port's neighbour, all express their concerns to the police but are told there is no evidence to indicate the deaths are linked. Meanwhile, Port is tried for perverting the course of justice and sentenced to eight months in prison, but he is released early with an electronic tag. Inquests are held into the deaths of Kovari and Whitworth, and both reach an open verdict. The coroner states there is insubstantial evidence to suggest murder but also raises concerns over how Barking police have carried out the investigation into Whitworth's death.
3	"Episode 3"	David Blair	Neil McKay	5 January 2022	4.37	5.93
The body of a fourth victim, Jack Taylor, is found in a public park adjacent to the same graveyard. His sisters challenge the police over their collection and interpretation of evidence, which again suggests that Taylor died from an accidental overdose, also claiming that Jack wasn't a drug user. They start conducting their own research and, through learning about the previous victims, they notice three of the deaths follow the same pattern and come to the conclusion that their brother was killed by someone. CCTV footage of Taylor meeting Port indicates the sisters' version of events to be correct. Port is arrested following a positive identification on the CCTV footage by a member of the police. The police concede to the families and friends of the victims that corroborated evidence now shows they were indeed murdered and that the Met will refer itself to the Independent Police Complaints Commission over the handling of the investigation. Port is tried at the Old Bailey and is found guilty on four counts of murder. He receives a whole life order.

== Release ==
Four Lives first aired from 3 to 5 January 2022 on BBC One.

It aired on SBS Television in Australia over three weeks from 14 April 2022.

Four Lives is distributed internationally by BritBox as The Barking Murders.

== Reception ==
Ed Cumming of The Independent rated the series with four stars out of five, writing "In less sensitive hands, a case like this could lend itself to prurience or melodrama, but Neil Mackay's [sic] script and David Blair's direction deftly avoid these traps". In The Guardian, Lucy Mangan gave a three-star rating, saying "The drama does a good job of making the victims... live again" but also noted "Beyond that and despite the usual great work of Sheridan Smith and others, the drama never catches fire". Hugo Rifkind of The Times wrote, "Superficially, the most interesting thing about Four Lives was the casting of the great Stephen Merchant as Port. There's something intrinsically chilling about a comedian as a killer, but Merchant was more blank than sinister. This didn't particularly matter because although Port inevitably sat at the heart of Four Lives, this was more a story about police incompetence".
