= John Bennett (businessman) =

Scottish businessman (born 1963)

- Born: June 1963 (age 63); Glasgow, Scotland
- Occupation: Asset management

John Bennett (born June 1963) is the former chairman of Rangers, having been a director at the club since 2015 until he became vice chairman and then later chairman. He stood down as chairman in 2024 and later sold his shares in 2025.

== Business career ==
Bennett attended Knightswood Secondary School in May 1980 and started a career in finance with Clydesdale Bank. He moved to investment management company Ivory and Sime, in September 1987 - a month before Black Monday. The years following saw him employed with GAM Investments, Gartmore Group and latterly Janus Henderson from 2011, where he oversaw portfolios worth £7.5billion as the Director of European Equities. In August 2023, Bennett announced he would retire from Henderson within twelve months to focus on his role as Rangers chairman.

== Football ==
Bennett is a lifelong Rangers fan who became a Rangers director on 6 May 2015. He was appointed vice-chairman on 27 March 2020 following a boardroom change which saw Dave King resign as chair and Douglas Park replace him. Just over three years later Bennett succeeded Park as Rangers chairman on 4 April 2023. In September 2024 Bennett stepped down as Rangers chairman for health reasons. In 2025 Bennett sold all his shares in Rangers to a US consortium of investors who completed a takeover of the club.

== Personal life ==
Bennett resides in the south east of England with his family, he is married with four children. Aside from football, his pastimes include fly fishing.
