= Eubha Akilade =

Scottish actress & dancer (born 1998)

- Born: 27 June 1998 (age 27); Cathcart, Glasgow, Scotland
- Education: Dance School of Scotland
- Occupations: Actress; dancer
- Years active: 2015–present
- Television: Eve; Find Me in Paris

Eubha Akilade (/ˈeɪvə ˌækəˈlɑːdi/ AY-və AK-ə-LAH-dee; born 27 June 1998) is a Scottish actress, dancer, and filmmaker. On television, she is known for her roles in the CBBC series Eve (2015–2017), the Hulu series Find Me in Paris (2018–2020) and the BBC One series Shetland (2022–present).

== Early life ==
Akilade was born on 27 June 1998 in Cathcart, Scotland. She is of Nigerian descent, was born to mother Christine, a Macmillan Cancer Support nurse, and she has a brother and a sister. Akilade began attending the Dance School of Scotland in Knightswood, but quit when she secured her role in Eve.

== Career ==
Akilade made her professional debut as Lily Watson in the CBBC children's series Eve in 2015, a role she portrayed until 2017, despite having no formal training. Then in 2017, she appeared in two episodes of the BBC Three series Clique as a receptionist. Later that year, she was cast as Ines Le Breton in the Hulu series Find Me in Paris, a role she portrayed until 2020. On her casting, Akilade commented: "Within two weeks of the audition, I found out that I’d got the part and that I was flying to Paris for the next six months two weeks later".

In 2020, Akilade joined the cast of the BBC Scotland crime drama Shetland for its seventh series as PC Lorna Burns. She also appeared in episodes of the soap operas Doctors and Casualty. In 2023, she had recurring roles as Olivia O'Neill in the ITVX thriller Six Four and Amy Callaghan in the Alibi thriller The Diplomat. Akilade made her professional stage debut originating the role of Rebecca in the musical Starter for Ten at the Bristol Old Vic.

== Filmography ==
| Year | Title | Role | Notes | Ref(s) |
|---|---|---|---|---|
| 2015–2017 | Eve | Lily Watson | Main role | |
| 2017 | Clique | Receptionist | 2 episodes | |
| 2018–2020 | Find Me in Paris | Ines Le Breton | Main role | |
| 2020 | Doctors | Sophie Broomfield | Episode: "Mamma Mia" | |
| 2020 | Casualty | Asma Khan | 1 episode | |
| 2022–present | Shetland | PC Lorna Burns | 10 episodes (series 7–) | |
| 2023 | Six Four | Olivia O'Neill | 2 episodes | |
| 2023 | The Diplomat | Amy Callaghan | 3 episodes | |
