= Jenny Bede =

English comedienne

Jenny Bede (born 1983) is an English comedian, actress and writer. Trained in musical theatre, she has performed since 2008 with a focus on musical comedy.

== Early life ==
Bede was born in 1983, and grew up in Pinner, London.

== Education ==
Bede trained in musical theatre at the Royal Academy of Music.

== Career ==
Bede worked as a PA prior to full-time comedy.

- In 2008, Bede first performed at the Edinburgh Festival Fringe, in a musical, returning in 2011 to 2014, in double-headers.
- In 2010, Bede joined the cast of NewsRevue, a resident musical sketch show, at Canal Cafe Theatre in Little Venice, London.
- In 2013, Bede wrote and starred in her first comedy pilot, AAA, for Comedy Feeds, for BBC3.
- In 2015, Bede performed Jenny Bede: Don’t Look at Me at the Edinburgh Festival Fringe.
- In 2017 and 2019 at the Edinburgh Fringe, Bede performed Jenny Bede: Eggtime and Jenny Bede: The Musical, an hour show at Just The Tonic at The Mash House, respectively.
- In 2022, Bede starred in Prince Andrew: The Musical as Sarah, Duchess of York.

== Recognition ==
- In 2013, Bede was the winner of the Musical Comedy Awards Best Newcomer.
- In 2015, Bede was a winner of The Observer's rising stars of 2015.
- In 2017, Bede was a winner of BAFTA Rocliffe New Writing Award, for her script, Baby.

== Filmography ==
=== Film ===
Year	Title	Role	Notes
2011	Too Posh to Push	Victoria Beckham	Short film
2013	Killer Moves	Imogen	Short film
2013	The World's End	Fitness Instructor	
2013	Convenience	Debbie	
2016	One Crazy Thing	Kelly	
2017	Mr. Happy	Rachel	Short film
2018	Blue Iguana	Waitress	
2019	Foreign	Jen	Short film
2023	The Doll's House	Gabby	Short film

=== Television ===
Year	Title	Role	Notes
2012	Comedy Feeds	Various characters	Episode: "Dawson Bros. Funtime"
2012	Misfits	Stephi	Episode: #4.6
2013	Watson & Oliver	Various characters	4 episodes
2014	Crackanory	Ella	Episode: "Let Me Be the Judge & I'm Still Here"
2014	Comedy Feeds	Various characters	Episode: "Jenny Bede: AAA". Also writer
2015	Episodes	Studio Office Manager	Episode: #4.1
2015	Broadchurch	Laura	2 episodes
2015	Murder in Successville	Taylor Swift, Nicki Minaj, Jessie J	3 episodes
2015	Not Safe for Work	Jane	Pilot episode
2015	Josh	Phoebe	Episode: "Swimming & Kissing"
2016	Stan Lee's Lucky Man	Receptionist	Episode: "Evil Eye"
2016	Eve	Rebecca	9 episodes
2016	Lovesick	Isabel	Episode: "Isabel"
2016	Off Their Rockers	–	Co-writer on episode: #4.6
2018	Bliss	Hostess	Episode: #1.1
2018	Sick Note	Penny Hayward	Episode: "Constable Polly"
2019	Catastrophe	Shop Girl	Episode: #4.1
2019	Four Weddings and a Funeral	Soph	Mini-series; episode: "We Broke"
2019	Content	Jenny	Episode: "Charity"
2019	Small Town Politics	–	Mini-series. Writer on all 3 episodes
2020	The Lock Inn Pub Quiz	Herself - Contestant	Episode: #1.7
2022	Prince Andrew: The Musical	Sarah Ferguson	Television Special
2023	Pointless Celebrities	Herself - Contestant	Episode: #15.20
2024	Spent	Rabbi	Episode: #1.3
2025	Stuffed	Sarah	Television film
