= Adrian Mead =

British screenwriter, director and author

- Occupations: Screenwriter, director, author
- Known for: Night People; Waking the Dead; Molly and Mack

Adrian Mead is a British screenwriter, director, and author.

== Career ==
Prior to working in television, Mead had worked odd jobs, such as a hairdresser in New York and a nightclub bouncer. While studying in Edinburgh for a degree in criminal psychology, Mead got involved with student short films. He began making his own short films in the early 2000s, and gained his first television writing credit on Where the Heart Is, followed by series such as Paradise Heights, Waking the Dead and River City. In 2005, he directed and co-wrote his feature debut, Night People. It was developed and financed under the Scottish Screen/SMG New Found Film initiative.

He also worked as a director on children's television, such as Eve and Molly and Mack, as well as doing second unit on The Replacement and the fourth series of Shetland. He authored a screenwriting manual, Making it as a Screenwriter, in 2008, which focused on practical tools and steps towards working in the British industry.

== Filmography ==
=== Television ===
- Where the Heart Is (2000–2001) - Writer
- Paradise Heights (2002) - Writer
- The Eustace Bros. (2003) - Writer
- Blue Dove (2004) - Writer
- Waking the Dead (2008) - Writer
- River City (2010) - Writer
- M.I. High (2014) - Director
- Eve (2015–2016) - Director
- Molly & Mack (2018–2019) - Lead director

=== Film ===
- Family (2002) - Director
- Hushtown (2004) - Director, writer
- Night People (2005) Director, co-writer
- Killer (2012) - Director, writer
- Misgivings (2016) - Director
