= Ben Cartwright (actor) =

British actor

Ben Cartwright (born 17 June 1976) is a British actor.

He appeared in Judge John Deed in 2001, playing Paul Bailey. He also had a small part in EastEnders in 2003, playing Tony Jamison.

He played Heath Gambol in Casualty in 2005. His fifth and most recent role in Casualty was as Felix Barstow, in July 2018.

In 2009, he appeared in the film version of Sherlock Holmes as a graveside policeman, and also played the role of a policeman in another 2009 release, The Imaginarium of Dr Parnassus.

Cartwright also had a role in the television series Hatfields & McCoys, which was aired on The History Channel in the USA on 28 May 2012. Cartwright plays Parris McCoy alongside Kevin Costner and Bill Paxton. The series has had the biggest ratings of any television show, second to the Super Bowl.

In 2013, he appeared in the British movie Run for Your Wife, which grossed just £602 at the UK box office, in its opening weekend.

He made an appearance as Steve Kettle in Tracy Beaker Returns and The Dumping Ground. He also portrayed DS Chris Henney in By Any Means.

He has appeared in the CBBC programme Eve as Nick Clarke.

He also appeared in Coronation Street as Neil Clifton, a police officer involved in the sexual exploitation and sexual grooming of Bethany Platt.

Cartwright was cast in the first series of ITV Drama Fearless in 2017. He played Phil Simms in the series and was hiding crucial information about his niece's disappearance.

In 2019, he plays Rasputin in the Netflix 6 episode docu-drama The Last Czars.

== Filmography ==
=== Film ===
Year	Title	Role	Notes
2007	The Marchioness Disaster	Reporter	Television film
2009	The Imaginarium of Doctor Parnassus	Policeman	
2009	Sherlock Holmes	Grave Policeman	
2009	Children of the Lake	Nick	
2012	Run for Your Wife	DS Troughton	
2017	The Riot Act	Philbin	Short film
2021	Mister Mayfair 2 - A Song to Kill For	Ricky	
2024	The Strangers: Chapter 1	Rudy	

=== Television ===
Year	Title	Role	Notes
1998	EastEnders	Ash	Guest role; 2 episodes
1999	The Bill	Simms	Episode: "When the Snow Lay Round About"
2001	In Deep	TSG Commander	Episode: "Blue on Blue"
2001	Judge John Deed	Paul Bailey	Episode: "Rough Justice"
2003	Doctors	Steve Allen	Episode: "Drinking Games"
2003	EastEnders	Tony Jamison	Guest role; 7 episodes
2005	Casualty	Heath Gambol	Episode: "Animals"
2007	Casualty	Joe Sheldon	Episode: "Day One"
2009	The Bill	Ray Pelosi	Episode: "Old Habits"
2010	Doctors	PC Matthew Radley	Episode: "Fault Lines"
2011	Casualty	Neil Denton	Episode: "To Have and Have Not"
2011	Doctors	PC Matthew Ridley	Episode: "The Good Guys"
2011–2012	Tracy Beaker Returns	Steve Kettle	Recurring role; 2 episodes
2012	Hatfields & McCoys	Parris McCoy	Miniseries; 2 episodes
2013	The Dumping Ground	Steve Kettle	Recurring role; 2 episodes
2013	By Any Means	DS Chris Heaney	Miniseries; 1 episode
2015	Doctors	Adrian Amerley	Episode: "The Lost Weekday"
2015–2016	Eve	Nick Clarke	Series regular; 24 episodes
2016	Casualty	Liam Medford	Episode: "History Repeating"
2017	Fearless	Phil Simms	Miniseries; 5 episodes
2017–2018	Coronation Street	Neil Clifton	Series regular; 30 episodes
2018	Casualty	Felix Barstow	Episode: "Series 32, Episode 43"
2019	Victoria	Feargus O'Connor	Recurring role; 2 episodes
2019	The Last Czars	Grigori Rasputin	Miniseries; 6 episodes
2021	Casualty	Sergeant Adrian Pitt	Episode: "Warning Signs"
2022	Four Lives	DS Martin O'Donnell	Miniseries; 2 episodes
2022–2023	The Bay	Paul Archer	Recurring role; 2 episodes
2023	The Long Shadow	Michael Baxter	Miniseries; 1 episodes
