= Of Monsters and Men discography =

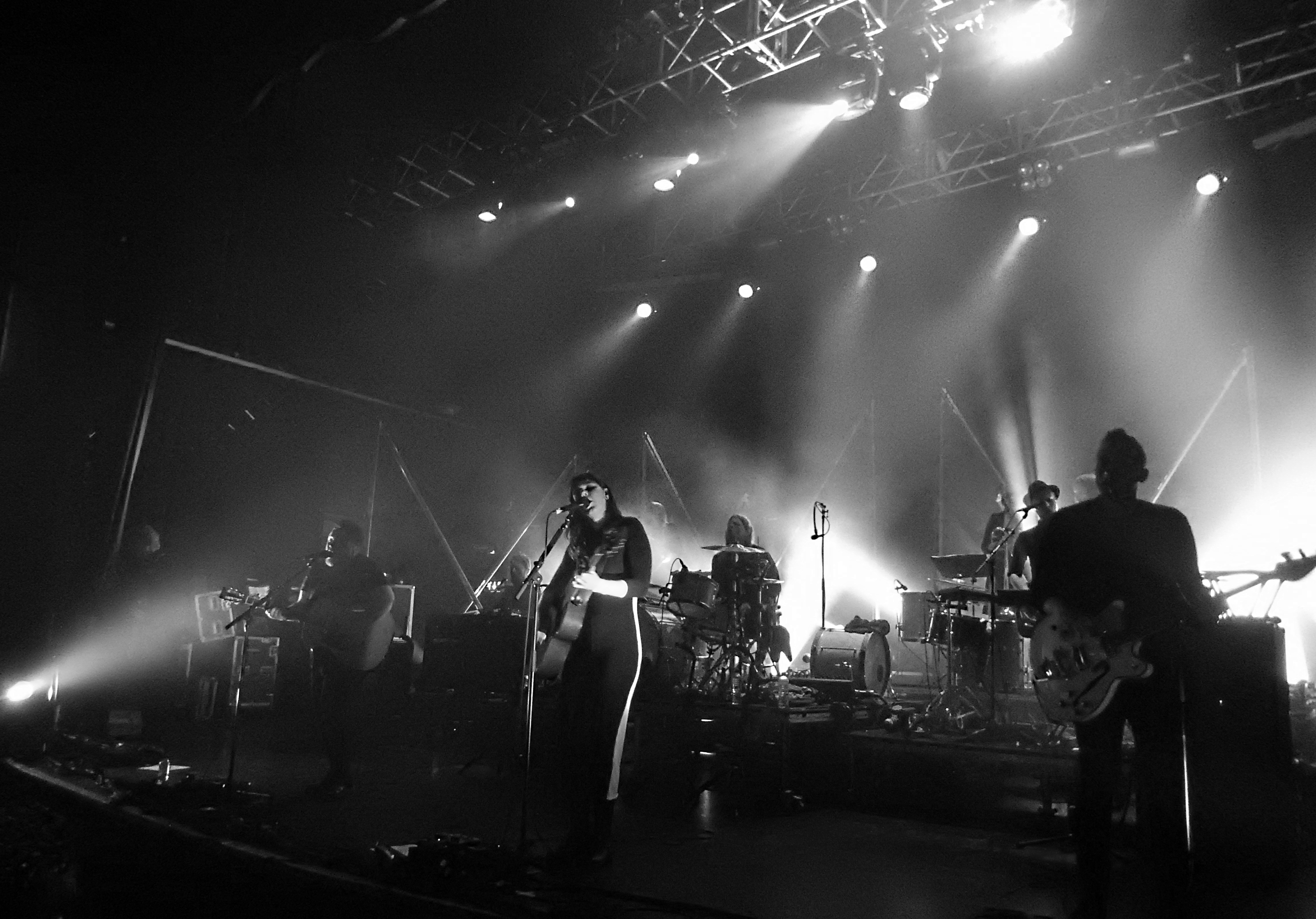
- Of Monsters and Men performing in London in June 2015
- Studio albums: 4
- Extended plays: 2
- Live albums: 2
- Compilation albums: 2
- Singles: 20
- Music videos: 14

The discography of the Icelandic indie folk/rock band Of Monsters and Men consists of four studio albums, two live albums, two compilation albums, two extended plays, twenty singles and fourteen music videos. The band was founded in Garðabær in 2010.

== Albums ==
=== Studio albums ===
List of studio albums, with selected chart positions and certifications
Title	Details	Peak chart positions										Certifications
Title	Details	ICE	AUS	AUT	BEL	CAN	GER	NZ	SWI	UK	US	Certifications
My Head Is an Animal	Released: 20 September 2011 (Iceland) 3 April 2012 (North America) 27 April 2012 (Europe); Label: Record, Republic; Formats: CD, LP, digital download, streaming	1	1	17	14	4	4	4	29	3	6	ARIA: 2× Platinum; BPI: Platinum; BVMI: Platinum; MC: 2× Platinum; RIAA: 2× Platinum; RMNZ: 2× Platinum
Beneath the Skin	Released: 8 June 2015 (Iceland) 9 June 2015 (Elsewhere); Label: Republic; Formats: CD, LP, digital download, streaming	2	4	20	23	1	10	10	6	10	3	BPI: Silver; MC: Gold
Fever Dream	Released: 26 July 2019; Label: Republic; Formats: CD, digital download, streaming	1	21	55	81	2	29	—	13	15	9	
All Is Love and Pain in the Mouse Parade	Released: 17 October 2025; Label: Skarkali; Formats: CD, LP, digital download, streaming	14	—	—	—	—	58	—	58	16	— (Note: All Is Love and Pain in the Mouse Parade did not enter the US Billboard 200, but peaked at number 46 on the Top Current Album Sales Chart.)	
"—" denotes a recording that did not chart or was not released in that territory.

=== Live albums ===
List of live albums
Title	Details
Live from Vatnagarðar	Released: 10 December 2013; Label: Republic; Formats: Digital download, streaming
My Head Is an Animal (The Cabin Sessions)	Released: 9 December 2022; Label: Republic; Formats: Digital download, streaming

=== Compilation albums ===
List of compilation albums
Title	Details
Ófreskja	Released: 1 April 2022; Label: Universal; Formats: Digital download, streaming
Manneskja	Released: 15 April 2022; Label: Universal; Formats: Digital download, streaming

== Extended plays ==
List of extended plays, with selected chart positions
Title	Details	Peak chart positions		
Title	Details	AUS	US	US Alt.
Into the Woods	Released: 20 December 2011 (United States); Label: Republic; Formats: CD, LP, digital download, streaming	66	108	18
Tíu	Released: 10 June 2022; Label: Republic; Formats: CD, LP, digital download, streaming	—	—	—
"—" denotes a recording that did not chart or was not released in that territory.

== Singles ==
List of singles, with selected chart positions and certifications, showing year released and album name
Title	Year	Peak chart positions										Certifications	Album
Title	Year	ICE	AUS	BEL	CAN	IRE	NZ	SWI	UK	US	US Rock	Certifications	Album
"Little Talks"	2011	1	7	3	55	1	4	24	12	20	3	ARIA: 6× Platinum; BPI: 4× Platinum; IFPI SWI: Gold; MC: 3× Platinum; RIAA: 7× Platinum; RMNZ: 2× Platinum	My Head Is an Animal
"Mountain Sound"	2012	—	29	— (Note: "Mountain Sound" did not enter the Ultratop 50, but peaked at number three on the Flemish Ultratip chart.)	69	28	22	— (Note: "Mountain Sound" did not enter the Swiss Singles chart but charted at number 90 on the Swiss Airplay chart.)	66	— (Note: "Mountain Sound" did not enter the Billboard Hot 100, but peaked at number three on the Bubbling Under Hot 100 Singles chart.)	14	ARIA: Platinum; BPI: Silver; MC: Gold; RIAA: Platinum; RMNZ: Gold	My Head Is an Animal
"Dirty Paws"	2013	—	—	—	—	—	35	75	— (Note: "Dirty Paws" did not enter the UK Singles Chart but peaked at number 86 on the UK Streaming Chart.)	—	24	ARIA: Platinum; BPI: Gold; MC: Gold; RIAA: Platinum; RMNZ: Gold	My Head Is an Animal
"King and Lionheart"	2013	—	—	—	—	—	—	— (Note: "King and Lionheart" did not enter the Swiss Singles chart, but charted at number 80 on the Swiss Airplay chart.)	—	—	28	RIAA: Platinum; RMNZ: Gold	My Head Is an Animal
"Crystals"	2015	2	94	— (Note: "Crystals" did not enter the Ultratop 50 but peaked at number 75 on the Flemish Ultratip chart.)	84	—	—	— (Note: "Crystals" did not enter the Swiss Singles chart but charted at number 58 on the Swiss Airplay chart.)	—	—	12		Beneath the Skin
"I of the Storm"	2015	—	—	—	—	—	—	—	—	—	28		Beneath the Skin
"Empire"	2015	25	—	—	—	—	—	—	—	—	— (Note: "Empire" did not enter the Hot Rock & Alternative Songs chart but peaked at number 33 on the Rock & Alternative Airplay chart.)		Beneath the Skin
"Hunger"	2015	—	—	—	—	—	—	—	—	—	26		Beneath the Skin
"Wolves Without Teeth"	2016	4	—	—	—	—	—	—	—	—	— (Note: "Wolves Without Teeth" did not enter the Hot Rock & Alternative Songs chart but peaked at number 49 on the Rock & Alternative Airplay chart.)		Beneath the Skin
"Alligator"	2019	6	—	—	— (Note: "Alligator" did not enter the Billboard Canadian Hot 100, but peaked at number 50 on the Canadian Digital Song Sales chart.)	—	—	—	—	—	8		Fever Dream
"Wild Roses"	2019	12	—	—	—	—	—	—	— (Note: "Wild Roses" did not enter the UK Singles Chart but peaked at number 93 on the UK Video Streaming Chart.)	—	38		Fever Dream
"Wars"	2019	11	—	—	—	—	—	—	—	—	34		Fever Dream
"Circles"	2020	15	—	—	—	—	—	—	—	—	—		Non-album single
"Visitor"	2020	21	—	—	—	—	—	—	—	—	48		Tíu
"Destroyer"	2021	5	—	—	—	—	—	—	—	—	— (Note: "Destroyer" did not enter the Hot Rock & Alternative Songs chart but peaked at number 24 on the Alternative Digital Song Sales chart.)		Tíu
"Phantom"	2021	35	—	—	—	—	—	—	—	—	—		My Head Is an Animal
"This Happiness"	2022	16	—	—	—	—	—	—	—	—	—		Tíu
"Television Love"	2025	28	—	—	—	—	—	—	—	—	—		All Is Love and Pain in the Mouse Parade
"Ordinary Creature"	2025	24	—	—	—	—	—	—	—	—	— (Note: "Ordinary Creature" did not enter the Hot Rock & Alternative Songs chart but peaked at number 20 on the Rock & Alternative Airplay chart.)		All Is Love and Pain in the Mouse Parade
"Dream Team" / "The Towering Skyscraper at the End of the Road"	2025	37	—	—	—	—	—	—	—	—	—		All Is Love and Pain in the Mouse Parade
"Dream Team" / "The Towering Skyscraper at the End of the Road"	2025	—	—	—	—	—	—	—	—	—	—		All Is Love and Pain in the Mouse Parade
"—" denotes a single that did not chart or was not released in that territory.

== Other charted songs ==
List of songs, with selected chart positions, showing year released and album name
Title	Year	Peak chart positions	Album
Title	Year	ICE	Album
"Organs"	2015	8	Beneath the Skin
"Soothsayer"	2019	21	Fever Dream
"Tuna in a Can"	2025	39	All Is Love and Pain in the Mouse Parade

== Other appearances ==
List of other appearances, with selected chart positions, showing year released and album name
Title	Year	Peak chart positions			Album
Title	Year	CAN	US Alt. Dig.	US Rock	Album
"Silhouettes"	2013	— (Note: "Silhouettes" did not enter the Billboard Canadian Hot 100 but peaked at number 61 on the Canadian Digital Song Sales chart.)	14	26	The Hunger Games: Catching Fire (Original Motion Picture Soundtrack)
"Sinking Man"	2013	—	—	—	The Walking Dead (AMC's Original Soundtrack), Vol. 1
"Thousand Eyes"	2015	—	—	—	Jessica Jones, Beneath the Skin
"—" denotes a song that did not chart or was not released in that territory.

== Music videos ==
List of music videos, showing year released and directors
Title	Year	Director(s)	Ref.
"Little Talks"	2012	WeWereMonkeys	
"Mountain Sound"	2012	Unknown	
"King and Lionheart"	2013	WeWereMonkeys	
"Crystals"	2015	Arni and Kinski	
"Empire"	2015	Tabitha Denholm	
"Wolves Without Teeth"	2016	Magnús Leifsson	
"Alligator"	2019	Shih-Ting Hung	
"Wild Roses"	2019	Thora Hilmarsdottir	
"Wars"	2019	WeWereMonkeys	
"Visitor"	2020	Thora Hilmarsdottir	
"Phantom"	2021	WeWereMonkeys	
"This Happiness"	2022	Arnar Rósenkranz Hilmarsson	
"Television Love"	2025	Erlendur Sveinsson	
"Ordinary Creature"	2025	Erlendur Sveinsson	
