= No One (Game of Thrones) =

- Game of Thrones episode
- Episode no.: Season 6 Episode 8
- Directed by: Mark Mylod
- Written by: David Benioff; D. B. Weiss
- Cinematography by: P. J. Dillon
- Editing by: Katie Weiland
- Original air date: June 12, 2016
- Running time: 58 minutes

Guest appearances
- Richard E. Grant as Izembaro; Essie Davis as Lady Crane; Julian Glover as Grand Maester Pycelle; Anton Lesser as Qyburn; Ian Gelder as Kevan Lannister; Faye Marsay as the Waif; Jacob Anderson as Grey Worm; Richard Dormer as Beric Dondarrion; Paul Kaye as Thoros of Myr; Clive Russell as Brynden Tully; Tobias Menzies as Edmure Tully; Tim Plester as Walder Rivers; Daniel Tuite as Lothar Frey; Daniel Portman as Podrick Payne; Eugene Simon as Lancel Lannister; Roger Ashton-Griffiths as Mace Tyrell; Hafþór Júlíus Björnsson as Gregor Clegane; Jóhannes Haukur Jóhannesson as Lem; Melanie Liburd as a Red Priestess; Leigh Gill as Bobono; Rob Callender as Clarenzo; Ricky Champ as Gatins; Ian Davies as Morgan; Ross McKinney as Riddell; Nanna Bryndís Hilmarsdóttir as a musician; Ragnar Þórhallsson as a musician; Arnar Rósenkranz Hilmarsson as a musician; Brynjar Leifsson as a musician; Kristján Páll Kristjánsson as a musician

Episode chronology
← Previous "The Broken Man"	Next → "Battle of the Bastards"
- Game of Thrones season 6

"No One" is the eighth episode of the sixth season of HBO's fantasy television series Game of Thrones, and the 58th episode overall. It was written by series co-creators David Benioff and D. B. Weiss, and directed by Mark Mylod.

Arya Stark fights for her life and chooses her destiny; Jaime Lannister returns Edmure Tully to Riverrun; Cersei Lannister is thwarted; Daenerys Targaryen returns to Meereen; and Sandor Clegane tracks down the Brotherhood Without Banners.

"No One" received mostly positive reviews from critics, who listed the conclusion of Arya's story with the Faceless Men, the reintroduction of the Brotherhood Without Banners, and Jaime's scheme to retake Riverrun as high points of the episode, but also received some criticism as being anticlimactic. Filming of the episode's foot chase scene between Arya and the Waif required a month of practice in Belfast to get the choreography right. In the United States, the episode achieved a viewership of 7.60 million in its initial broadcast. The episode was Peter Dinklage and Maisie Williams' selection for the 68th Primetime Emmy Awards to support their nominations.

This episode marked the final appearance of Tom Wlaschiha (Jaqen H'ghar), Faye Marsay (the Waif), and Clive Russell (Brynden Tully).

== Plot ==
=== In King's Landing ===
The Faith Militant arrive to take Cersei to see the High Sparrow, but Cersei refuses to go with them. Tommen announces he has decided to end the practice of trial by combat as a means of resolving conflicts. Cersei is unnerved by the prospect of a trial by seven septons instead. Qyburn then reports to Cersei about a "rumor" that she ordered him to investigate, and remarks that it is "more, much more".

=== In the Riverlands ===
The Hound kills some of the men from the Brotherhood Without Banners who had raided his community. Beric Dondarrion and Thoros of Myr try to recruit The Hound into the Brotherhood to fight the threat from the north.

Brienne proposes to Jaime that if she can convince the Blackfish to surrender, then Jaime will allow him and the Tully army safe passage north to fight for Sansa. Jaime gives Brienne until nightfall. The Blackfish is sympathetic to Sansa's plight, but refuses to abandon Riverrun, so Jaime coerces Edmure into commanding the Tullys to surrender by threatening to kill his son. The Blackfish helps Brienne and Podrick escape, but remains to fight the Lannisters and dies doing so.

=== In Meereen ===
Varys leaves for Westeros to find more allies. Tyrion, Grey Worm, and Missandei celebrate Meereen's rejuvenation as a fleet sent by the Masters arrives to attack the city. Daenerys returns to Meereen with Drogon.

=== In Braavos ===
Lady Crane finds an injured Arya and treats her wounds. While Arya rests, the Waif finds and kills Lady Crane, intending to kill Arya as well. Arya flees to her hideout with the Waif in pursuit. Once trapped at the hideout, Arya puts out the single candle lighting the room and fights the Waif in the dark.

Jaqen follows a trail of blood to the Hall of Faces, where he finds the Waif's face before being held at sword-point by Arya. Jaqen congratulates Arya for finally becoming No One, but she rejects the title, asserting her identity as Arya Stark of Winterfell and declaring that she is returning home.

== Production ==
=== Writing ===
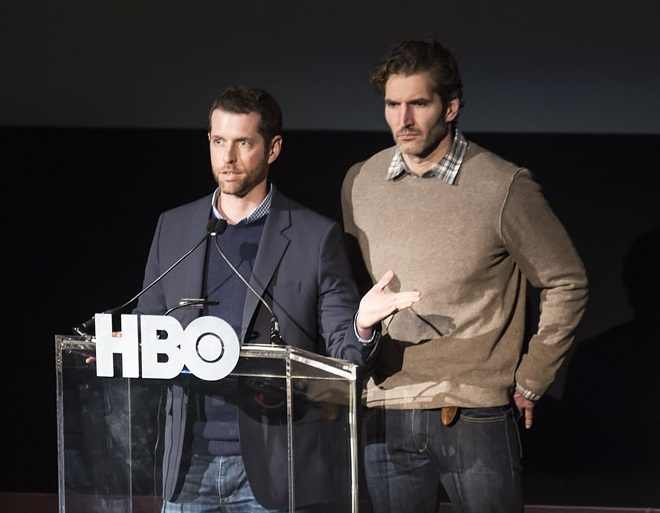
The episode was written by series co-creators David Benioff and D. B. Weiss.

"No One" was written by the series' creators David Benioff and D. B. Weiss.

In the "Inside the Episode" featurette published by HBO following the airing of the episode, David Benioff spoke about the revelation in King's Landing, and Tommen's decision to abolish "trial by combat," stating "This moment is a grievous blow for Cersei because she's been counting on trial by combat really since the end of season five. This was always her ace in the hole, the Mountain was never going to lose a trial by combat there's no one out there who could beat him. And then Tommen takes it away from her and knowing really what he's doing. He might be a weak King, but he's not an idiot, he understands that this move is going to mean that she's probably not going to fare that well in this trial. So it's a pretty devastating moment for Cersei, and you see that in her reaction, and partly because it just bodes so ill for this coming trial, and partly because it's her own son who's really betrayed her."

Speaking about the siege of Riverrun, Weiss noted about Brienne and Jaime's reunion that "Jaime didn't expect to see Brienne necessarily ever again, he certainly didn't expect to see her marching into his military camp. And his relationship is obviously very complicated, and fraught, and has undercurrents that he's uncomfortable with feeling." Benioff continued about Brienne's escape, "It's these two who are not quite sure how they feel about the other, and he lets her go. He'd be well within his rights to send his men after her, to capture her, and it wouldn't be that hard to capture her since she's being slowly rowed away by Podrick, but he doesn't. She might technically be an enemy now that she's serving Sansa Stark, who is still obviously a suspect in Joffrey's murder, but she's not Jaime's enemy."

Clive Russell, who portrayed Brynden "Blackfish" Tully in the series, spoke about his character's encounter with Brienne of Tarth, in an interview with IGN, noting "Brienne represented for him his young self, a person of integrity, a soldier of integrity, trying to do the right thing. That added to the conflict he felt of what was the right thing to do: whether to send men to Sansa or not." He continued by saying about their relationship to each other, "She spoke very clearly to power. She was talking to an older man who's, initially, very irritated by her being there, but eventually takes her very, very seriously. There's a touching moment where he acknowledges that to her face. It's very touching and sad, and I think that's what it's about. He's really recognizing the next generation of what I once was."

In the conclusion of the "Inside the Episode" segment Weiss spoke about Arya's story, saying "Arya is in danger, she's got an open wound in her stomach, and the one person who has protected her to this point unfortunately gets murdered. The fact that the Many-Faced God gets the people who have been promised to him really makes you think that there's almost an inevitability about what happens to people who run afoul of the Faceless Men, as Arya has done." Weiss continued about the final part of the sequence, "Arya's telling Jaqen by putting the face on the wall that 'this account is settled, and we're good here, and now I'm going to walk away,' and I think she knows what the answer's going to be. The implication, obviously, is that Jaqen was, on some level, rooting for the outcome that he got. He may be "no one," but there's still enough of a person left in him to respect, and admire who this girl is and what she's become. Arya finally tells us something that we've kind of known all along, that she's not no one, she's Arya Stark of Winterfell."

=== Casting ===
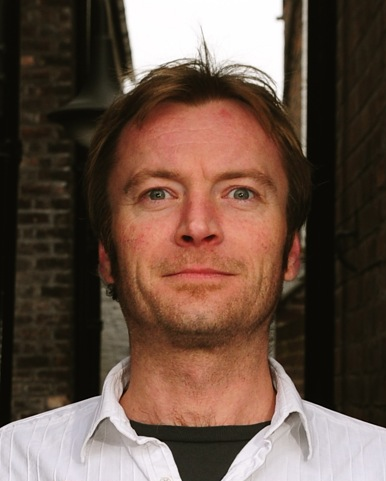
Richard Dormer (pictured) and Paul Kaye returned to the series as Beric Dondarrion and Thoros of Myr, respectively.

"No One" saw the reintroduction of Richard Dormer and Paul Kaye, who portrayed Beric Dondarrion and Thoros of Myr, respectively, in the third season, last appearing in the episode "The Bear and the Maiden Fair", before returning for the sixth season. Dormer was previously asked about returning to Game of Thrones in an interview in February 2015, saying at the time that he was doubtful about coming back to the series, stating "they haven't told me about it, so I don't think so." He also noted about his portrayal of the character, "Beric was a noble character, a leader of men. Kind of like Robin Hood. So I thought, that's how I'll play the guy." Paul Kaye's participation in the series was confirmed in mid-April 2016, with his agency posting about the casting shortly before the premiere of the sixth season.

The episode also featured the deaths of several recurring characters in the series. Faye Marsay, who portrayed the Waif, spoke about her participation in the episode, and leaving Game of Thrones after several seasons, saying "As much as I'm sad that I'm now off of the show, I think that storyline needed to be concluded that way. I'm rooting for Arya and Maisie as well. Even though I won't be able to hang out with everyone again, I think it was done right and done properly. I think Arya deserved to rip off her face and stick it on a wall." Recurring guest actors Clive Russell as Blackfish, and Essie Davis as Lady Crane portrayed their characters for the last time in the series, as they were killed off screen.

In the first scene featuring Sandor "the Hound" Clegane, comedian Steve Love was cast as one of the Brotherhood members killed by the Hound. Love previously had become known for his impressions of various Game of Thrones characters, uploading the video to YouTube, which ultimately resulted in his appearing on Jimmy Kimmel Live!. Following the appearance, Love stated that he had received an email from Benioff offering him a part in the show, saying "I broached the subject by sending them an email back saying 'Listen I don't know what your plans are for me but it would really mean a lot to me if I could have one of those trademark Game of Thrones gruesome death scenes, and they wrote back saying 'Actually Steve, that was exactly what we had in mind for you.'"

=== Filming ===
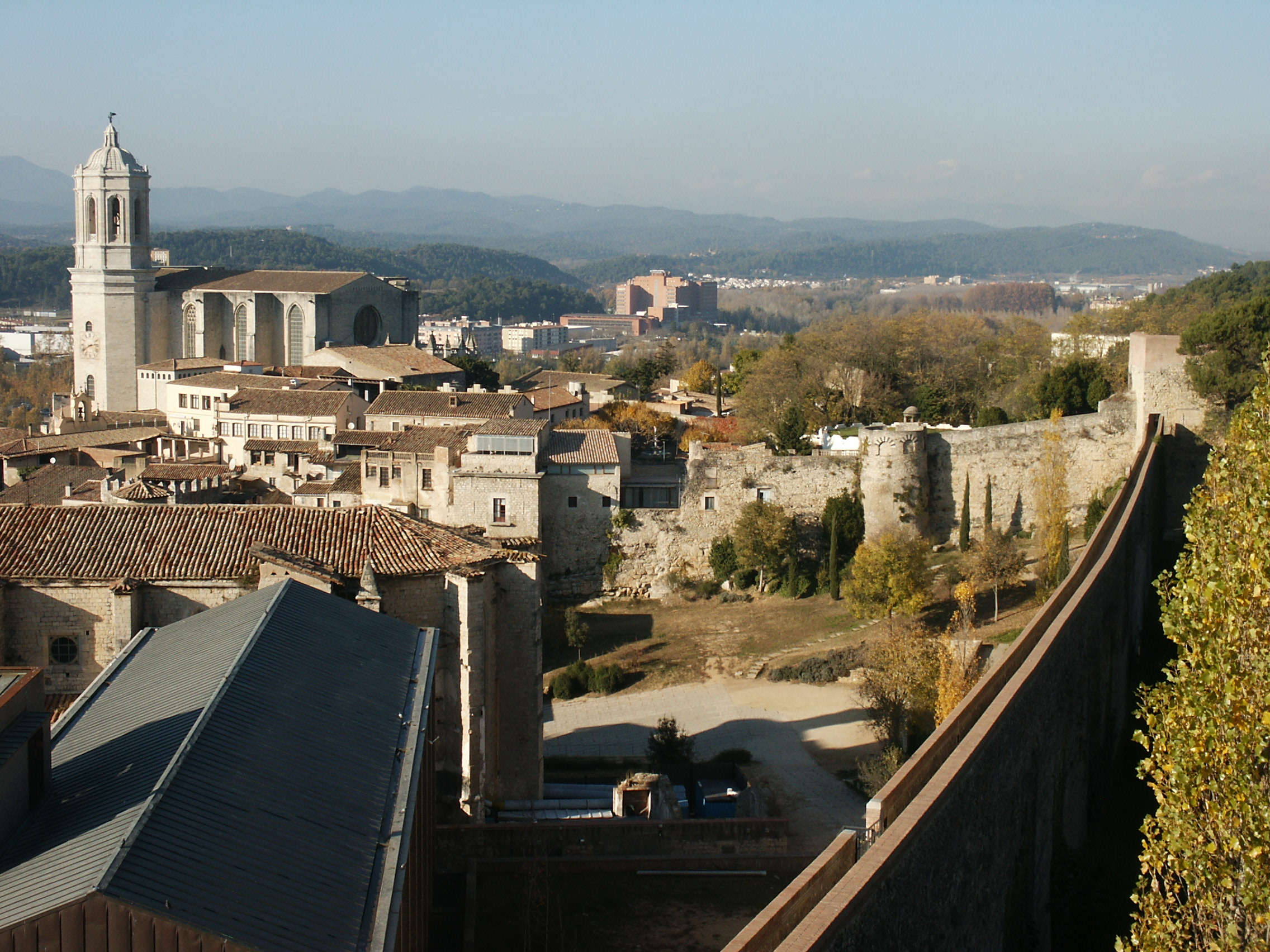
Filming of the exterior chase scenes throughout Braavos took place in Girona, Spain.

"No One" was directed by Mark Mylod. Mylod previously directed the fifth season episodes "High Sparrow" and "Sons of the Harpy". Mylod also directed the previous episode, "The Broken Man", for the sixth season. Mylod stated in an interview that the most physically challenging scene to direct was the chase scene, while the scene he was most scared to shoot was the conversation between Jaime and Edmure, stating that he felt the writing was "so freaking good that I was scared about fucking it up."

Mylod additionally spoke about filming the final scenes of the episode, the foot chase between Arya and the Waif, in the behind the scenes featurette published by HBO after the airing of the episode. Mylod stated that he did extensive research in order to create the foot chase, saying "I devoured every foot chase in the history of cinema, but trying to take from that something that would fit into the blueprint of the Game of Thrones visual style, which is not necessarily the same kind of kinetic, handheld feel that you find in many contemporary thrillers. It's a much more classic frame." He continued, "Everything hinged from finding this very lovely, steep stairwell and thinking 'Wouldn't it be great if she leapt off that, and then tumbled down the stairs?' I had this image in my head that I wanted lots of oranges rolling down, not quite sure where that comes from, but it looked pretty." Mylod also stated in a separate interview that it was a conscious decision not to show the final fight between Arya and the Waif, given that it took place in the dark, noting "when the character dies in the dark, unless we switch on night-vision goggles, we're not going to be able to see that, and we're not going to stick around to hear a scream in the dark anyway. It was actually a conscious choice in the writing and I think, for me, a very elegant storytelling beat as to get that reveal a few seconds later."

In an interview, Maisie Williams described the thought process behind Arya's scenes, as well as the process of filming saying "We wanted people to think this could be the end, or the start of the end. Like maybe her wound is going to fester – like The Hound." She continued, "There was this constant spectrum of conversation with Mark Mylod during the chase of about how petrified she needs to look, but also how safe she is. Arya's been very lucky with the people she's encountered so far. The whole time she was with The Hound she took a back seat because he was really good. So I wanted her to look like she was struggling." Williams also stated that she gave input on how the scene should take place, stating "I didn't want the chase stunt to be unnecessary or superhuman. I got on set and they were going to have Arya rolling around, and diving, and I was like, "That looks amazing, but no." I'd be like, "Why would she run over there? She'd just duck under here and just get out." It doesn't look quite as cinematic, maybe, but they'll have to find something else if they want cinematic. And I felt awful because the job of the stunt guys is to make everything look as crazy and cool as possible. But I know Arya now. In the beginning it was a lot of guesswork and now I've figured her out."

Faye Marsay, who portrayed the Waif, spoke about her scenes and filming with Williams, saying, "I think we did a month in Belfast before we started shooting. We went into the stunt tent and lived there. It was choreographed like a dance. Maisie is so well coordinated and good at what she does. I'm a little bit less coordinated and easily pissed off. I would drop the stick down and go, "I can't do it!" And she would encourage me. She's so supportive. We did a month, and then the day before the cameras turned on, we would go through the moves a couple of times so we wouldn't hurt each other. There were a few times we clipped each other. I remember getting her in the stomach really bad one time, and she nearly cut my ear off at one point. It was fun. It was a lot of fun, but we were exhausted as well."

The castle face, and drawbridge were physically built, with the rest added in post-production with special effects.

Filming of the Riverrun sequence began in October 2015, and led to some complaints by locals living in the area following the construction of a portion of the Tully castle. The shooting of the scenes took place in Corbet, County Down, Northern Ireland. Due to some concerns over the size of the structure, filming was unable to take place until local inspectors were able to determine if the production unit followed what had been agreed upon in the "planning application." Construction of a portion of the castle began in September, with tents and wooden additions being added shortly after. In addition, the production unit also created an actual working drawbridge for the scenes, rather than relying on CGI to create the set piece. Visual effects were added to create the rest of the castle.

Clive Russell, who portrayed Blackfish, spoke about working with Gwendoline Christie as Brienne of Tarth, noting "There's something very curious, by the way, I'm probably about 6'6" tall. I think she's about 6'3", but all the time I worked with her, I felt like she was taller than me. Now I don't really know what that has to do with it. It might be something to do with being confronted by a physically charismatic very tall woman, or maybe it's that she's caught the impressiveness of the character of that woman, that soldier. She's also an extraordinarily hilarious woman. We had great fun together. It was great fun to play." Gwendoline Christie also spoke about filming with Nikolaj Coster-Waldau, who portrays Jaime Lannister, again, saying "I was excited, It was really fun to be with Nikolaj again, and I thought the way of which their reunion happens is not really expected. I just loved that it was so formal, because within the confines of such formality, and having to negotiate with each other, there are so many other stories begging to be told in those moments. There's a slow process of creeping familiarity among two people who haven't been together for a long time; it was allowed to build." Coster-Waldau also spoke about their first reunion scene, stating "It's a great scene. These characters are so much about holding their cards so close to their chest and they don't want to reveal how they're feeling. But we know there's history between them, that this is more than two knights meeting. But they would never acknowledge that."

Mylod, spoke about the decision to show Blackfish's death off screen, saying "there was a lot of tonal discussion about this, and I think I can safely speak for the writers that the choice was a conscious one in the writing not to see his actual death, because the emotional focus was really about the final moments between him and Brienne -- two warriors, two samurais, facing each other -- and Brienne's acknowledgment that this fellow samurai has chosen his moment, and this is his moment of dignity and choice of his death. So it was really about that moment of choice and the dignity and acceptance between these two great warriors, rather than the actual detail of his actual death. That was actually a tonal choice as to how we saw that character."

== Reception ==
=== Ratings ===
"No One" was viewed by 7.60 million American households on its initial viewing on HBO, which was slightly less than the previous week's rating of 7.80 million viewers for the episode "The Broken Man". The episode also acquired a 3.9 rating in the 18–49 demographic, making it the highest rated show on cable television of the night. In the United Kingdom, the episode was viewed by 2.436 million viewers on Sky Atlantic, making it the highest-rated broadcast that week on its channel. It also received 0.113 million timeshift viewers.

=== Critical reception ===
"No One" was received mostly positively by critics, who listed the conclusion of Arya's story with the Faceless Men, the reintroduction of the Brotherhood Without Banners, and Jaime's scheme to retake Riverrun as high points of the episode, but some critics described sequences in the episode as being anticlimactic. It has received an 85% rating on the review aggregator website Rotten Tomatoes from 47 reviews with an average score of 7.2/10. The site's consensus reads ""No One" sees some fan favorites back in action and moves the final few pieces into place for a momentous – and long-awaited – battle."

Matt Fowler of IGN wrote in his review for the episode, ""No One" may have given us a bloodless siege, but there were plenty of bloody moments, namely from the brothers Clegane, who were both awesomely brutal this week. Though not against one another, as it looks like, for now, the Cleganebowl's been canceled. I loved the end of Arya's arc along with Jaime's scheme to take Riverrun - though I'm curious to see what comes of the Tully angle. Brienne failed to get an army for Sansa and Jaime's just going to head back home now? It seems like there should be more to this that him just winning one for the Lannister name. Though regardless of what the payoff might be, it was still good to see how so much of this story tied back to the first three seasons and Jaime's time as Catelyn's prisoner." He gave the episode an 8.2 out of 10. Myles McNutt of The A.V. Club criticized the episode's momentum within the season, writing "The lack of momentum driving these stories is surprising to me given that the season has largely been doing a fine job with internal momentum." McNutt continued, "The show may have run into an unfortunate convergence of so many anti-climactic storylines in a single episode, but their very existence is a necessary byproduct of a narrative that is preparing to shed its skin and move forward with a new lease on life." Despite this, he gave the episode a grade of B−. Erik Kain of Forbes wrote about the episode, "Not the greatest episode of the season, but I still didn't want it to end. Sometimes I realize that even an episode I have lots of complaints about manages to be some of the best television out there. Game of Thrones isn't always on the money, but even an off night can be surprisingly good." James Hibberd of Entertainment Weekly summarized the episode in his review by saying "Cheers, chills, and the sound of online fan theories imploding. "No One" delivered Jaime Lannister's finest scene in years, a thrilling chase, and set one Stark on an exciting new path."

Jeremy Egner of The New York Times criticized the episode in his review, writing, "It's just not all that satisfying. After endless weeks of stick-beating and the events of last week, it all seemed a little too tidy," and additionally called Arya's story "anticlimactic." However, Egner also praised the episode's continuation with the King's Landing story, as well as the follow-up with Sandor Clegane and the Brotherhood Without Banners. TV Guide's Damian Holbrook criticized as implausible the fact that Arya, after being stabbed multiple times in the previous episode by the Waif, was able to outrun and kill her faster, stronger nemesis in this episode. Hanh Nguyen of Indiewire also felt the Riverrun sequence ended in an anticlimactic fashion as well.

=== Accolades ===
Year	Award	Category	Nominee(s)	Result	Ref.
2016	Primetime Emmy Awards	Outstanding Supporting Actor in a Drama Series	Peter Dinklage as Tyrion Lannister	Nominated	
2016	Primetime Emmy Awards	Outstanding Supporting Actress in a Drama Series	Maisie Williams as Arya Stark	Nominated	
2016	Primetime Creative Arts Emmy Awards	Outstanding Production Design for a Fantasy Program	Deborah Riley, Paul Ghirardani, Rob Cameron	Won	
2017	ADG Excellence in Production Design Award	One-Hour Single Camera Period Or Fantasy Television Series	Deborah Riley	Nominated	
