= Blood of My Blood =

- Game of Thrones episode
- Episode no.: Season 6 Episode 6
- Directed by: Jack Bender
- Written by: Bryan Cogman
- Cinematography by: Jonathan Freeman
- Editing by: Yan Miles
- Original air date: May 29, 2016
- Running time: 51 minutes

Guest appearances
- Diana Rigg as Olenna Tyrell; Richard E. Grant as Izembaro; David Bradley as Walder Frey; Essie Davis as Lady Crane; Joseph Mawle as Benjen Stark; Tobias Menzies as Edmure Tully; Ellie Kendrick as Meera Reed; Faye Marsay as the Waif; Roger Ashton-Griffiths as Mace Tyrell; Ian Gelder as Kevan Lannister; Hannah Waddingham as Septa Unella; James Faulkner as Randyll Tarly; Samantha Spiro as Melessa Tarly; Eugene Simon as Lancel Lannister; Tim Plester as Black Walder Rivers; Daniel Tuite as Lothar Frey; Kevin Eldon as "Ned Stark" actor; Leigh Gill as Bobono; Eline Powell as Bianca; Rob Callender as "Joffrey Baratheon" actor; Eva Butterly as "Margaery Tyrell" actress; David Rintoul as King Aerys II Targaryen; Freddie Stroma as Dickon Tarly; Rebecca Benson as Talla Tarly; Robert Aramayo as young Ned Stark; Raül Tortosa as Tyrell bannerman; Lucy Hayes as Lady Kitty Frey; William and James Wilson as little Sam; Nanna Bryndís Hilmarsdóttir as a musician; Ragnar Þórhallsson as a musician; Arnar Rósenkranz Hilmarsson as a musician; Brynjar Leifsson as a musician; Kristján Páll Kristjánsson as a musician

Episode chronology
← Previous "The Door"	Next → "The Broken Man"
- Game of Thrones season 6

"Blood of My Blood" is the sixth episode of the sixth season of HBO's fantasy television series Game of Thrones, and the 56th overall. The episode was written by Bryan Cogman, and directed by Jack Bender.

Bran Stark and Meera Reed are rescued from the White Walkers by Benjen Stark. Samwell Tarly returns to his family's home in Horn Hill, accompanied by Gilly and little Sam; Jaime Lannister attempts to rescue the Queen, Margaery Tyrell; Arya Stark defies the Faceless Men; and Daenerys Targaryen rides on Drogon and emboldens her newly acquired khalasar.

"Blood of My Blood" was positively received by critics, who praised the return of several notable characters, including Benjen Stark, Walder Frey and Edmure Tully, as well as several plot points, such as Samwell's return to Horn Hill, and Arya's decision to return to being a Stark rather than a disciple of the Many-Faced God. The episode title is a reference to a famous Dothraki saying used between a Khal and his bloodriders. Filming of Bran's visions was put together precisely and also very carefully chosen. In the United States, the episode achieved a viewership of 6.71 million in its initial broadcast.

== Plot ==
=== Beyond the Wall ===
Bran and Meera continue fleeing the wights. Bran, still in his visions, sees events past and future, including Jaime Lannister killing King Aerys Targaryen, the Night King's attack on the wildling settlement Hardhome, a dragon flying over the Red Keep, and wildfire exploding beneath King's Landing. As the wights close in, a rider appears, pulls Meera and Bran onto his horse, and they escape.

Bran awakens to find the rider is his uncle, Benjen Stark, who had gone missing beyond the Wall. Benjen explains he was stabbed by a White Walker, but that the Children of the Forest saved him. He tells Bran that he is the Three-Eyed Raven, and that he must learn to control his abilities and be "ready" before the Night King comes south.

=== In King's Landing ===
The High Sparrow and Tommen prepare for Margaery's walk of atonement. Tommen is allowed to visit Margaery and discovers that Margaery has become a devout follower of the Faith and has repented for her sins.

Jaime and Mace Tyrell lead the Tyrell soldiers to the Great Sept of Baelor, where the High Sparrow is presenting Margaery to the people. Jaime orders the High Sparrow to release Margaery and Loras, threatening force against the Faith Militant. The High Sparrow declares that Margaery will not perform a walk of atonement, and presents Tommen, who announces that he has agreed to unite the Faith and the Crown. Mace asks Olenna what this means. She replies the High Sparrow has won.

Tommen punishes Jaime for taking up arms against the Faith by removing him from the Kingsguard. Jaime receives orders to oust the Blackfish from Riverrun. Cersei counsels him to use the campaign to demonstrate their force to their enemies. Cersei expresses no concern about her upcoming trial, as it will be a trial by combat with the Mountain as her champion. Cersei and Jaime passionately kiss.

=== At the Twins ===
Lord Walder Frey learns that House Tully's former seat Riverrun has been retaken by Brynden "Blackfish" Tully. Walder orders his son Lothar Frey and Black Walder Rivers to recapture the castle. He brings in Edmure Tully, held prisoner since the Red Wedding, and declares they will use him to retake Riverrun.

=== In The Reach ===
Samwell, Gilly, and Little Sam arrive at Horn Hill, the seat of House Tarly. Sam warns Gilly not to mention that she is a Wildling, as his father Randyll hates Wildlings. At dinner, Randyll insults Sam. Gilly defends Sam, but inadvertently reveals her Wildling heritage. Disgusted, Randyll tells Sam that Gilly and Little Sam can remain at Horn Hill, but that he must never set foot in Horn Hill again. Sam bids farewell to Gilly, but then changes his mind, choosing to bring her and Little Sam to the Citadel. Sam also takes House Tarly's ancestral Valyrian steel sword, Heartsbane.

=== In Braavos ===
Arya watches the play featuring Lady Crane and sneaks backstage to poison her rum. As Arya leaves, Lady Crane stops her. They discuss acting and Lady Crane's early life. Arya stops her from drinking her rum and warns that her rival, Bianca, wants her dead. The Waif witnesses this scene and tells Jaqen of Arya's failure. Jaqen gives the Waif permission to kill Arya. Arya retrieves her sword, Needle, and goes into hiding.

=== In the Dothraki Sea ===
While riding, Daenerys notices an unusual gust of wind and rides out alone to investigate. As Daario, impatient, prepares to follow her, Drogon flies over the khalasar, having grown much larger, with Daenerys on his back. Daenerys lands nearby, rallying the Dothraki by stating that she chooses them all to be her bloodriders, rather than the traditional three chosen by khals. She asks if they will help her retake the Seven Kingdoms and they shout their agreement.

== Production ==
=== Writing ===
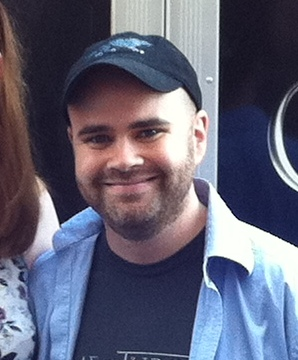
Series veteran Bryan Cogman wrote the episode, his first of two episodes of the season.

"Blood of My Blood" was written by Bryan Cogman. Cogman has been a writer for the series since its beginning, previously writing seven other episodes, as well as the subsequent episode. The title of the episode, "Blood of My Blood", is a reference to the famous Dothraki saying between a Khal and his bloodriders.

In an interview with Entertainment Weekly, Cogman described some of the thought process he had when writing the reunion between Samwell and his family, saying, "As much as Sam has gone through, I love exploring those family dynamics. His mother and sister and brother are all fundamentally decent people but his father is just a cold hearted bastard when it comes to his distant son. There's a painful part of the scene where his father just unloads on him and tells him every hateful thing he ever thought about him and Sam can't defend himself. We found that fascinating – Sam has killed a man, he's killed a White Walker, he's emerged as such a great hero, but he still can't stand up to his dad."

Cogman noted, about the Arya storyline in the same interview, that he comes from a theater background, and that "being able to comment on the show and the reactions to the show through the players were so much fun. The show is often accused of being gratuitous in all kinds of way – the violence and the bigness of the characters. It's a huge operatic story. We're able to lovingly spoof ourselves but also play with ideas about how audiences view the show, good and bad, and how a perspective of a story changes. Plus there’s the dramatic deliciousness of Arya watching her own life play out on stage." Weiss also spoke about Arya, saying "We were excited to do the play within the play, and it's a distorted fun house mirror representation of things we've already seen." Benioff continued, "Part of Arya's amusement is just that she knows that they're getting so many details wrong, but she always regretted that she didn't have a chance to watch Joffrey die, and now she gets to. It's obviously a comic version of it, but that gives her great pleasure." Weiss also noted, "Arya is slowly getting seduced by these performances, and Lady Crane, the actress that she's charged with killing, this is somebody who like her has taken as her life's work the job of becoming other people."

In regards to the final scene of the episode with Daenerys Targaryen riding Drogon and emboldening her newly acquired khalasar, Benioff stated in the "Inside the Episode" featurette that the scene is a reflection of the speech that Khal Drogo gave before his death, with Benioff saying "One of our favorite moments from season one was watching Khal Drogo deliver a speech to his gathered khalasar, that speech clearly lingered in Daenerys's mind, and she's echoing almost the exact same language when she's talking to the Dothraki now. She's basically telling them the promise that one of the great Khals had made years before and saying now is the time to live up to that promise and fulfill it."

=== Casting ===
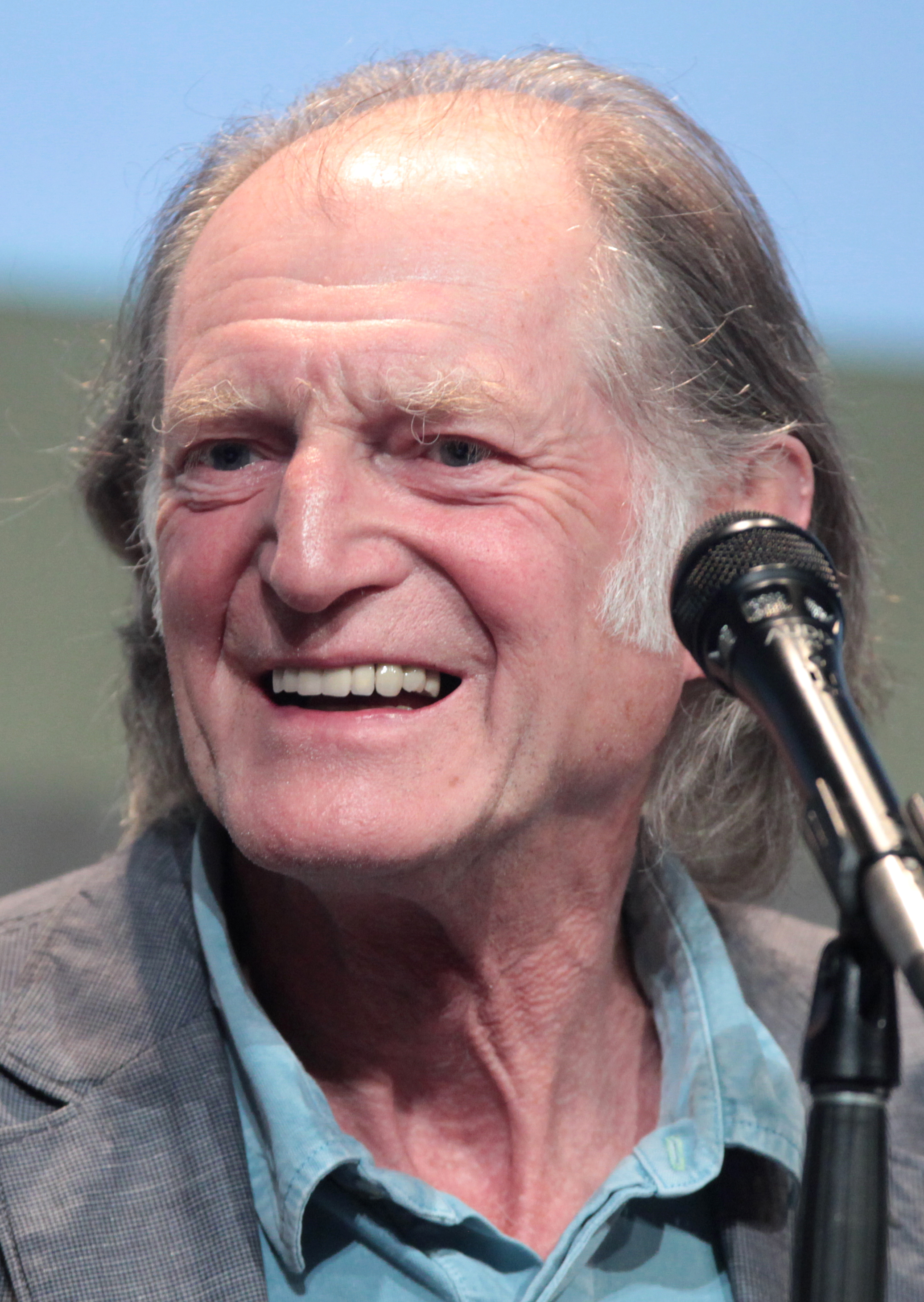
Actor David Bradley (pictured), as well as Joseph Mawle and Tobias Menzies returned to the series after a nearly three-year absence.

The episode saw the return of several characters from previous seasons and the introduction of new characters that had either been mentioned or had some connection to established characters. Joseph Mawle, who was previously cast to play Benjen Stark and was featured in three episodes in the show's first season before disappearing (as he does in the A Song of Ice and Fire series that the show is based on). In an interview with Entertainment Weekly, Bryan Cogman spoke of the re-introduction of Benjen and Mawle to the show saying "It was great to have Joe Mawle back with us – it must have been a trip for him to step back into the character after so long – but he's also decidedly not the Benjen of season 1. So that was fun to explore." Mawle had been interviewed in 2013, where he expressed his desire to return to the series.

Another return involved the story of the Riverlands with actor David Bradley returning to the show as Walder Frey, who last appeared in the aftermath of the Red Wedding, as well as Tobias Menzies as Edmure Tully, who also had not appeared since the Red Wedding episode "The Rains of Castamere", in the third season. Tim Plester, who plays one of Walder's sons also returned but his other son, Lothar, was re-cast, with Daniel Tuite taking over the role.

Several new actors were cast as Samwell Tarly's family in Horn Hill. Samwell's father, Randyll Tarly, had been referenced several times and had been described as "cruel" in his treatment of his oldest son. In an interview with The Hollywood Reporter, John Bradley (Samwell Tarly) spoke about the introduction of his family to the series, stating, "When you see Sam with his father and mother and brother especially, he starts to make sense. The character is contextualized. Why is his psyche the way it is? Why does he behave the way he does? Ever since you first saw him, he comes from this very sincere and heartfelt maternal love, and then there's this monster. You can see why he's so damaged. His emotional life has been pulled in so many different directions. He's so incredibly confused." Actor James Faulkner was cast in the role of Randyll, with Samantha Spiro portraying Samwell's mother and Freddie Stroma and Rebecca Benson portraying Samwell's brother Dickon and sister Talla.

For Bran's brief vision sequence at the beginning of the episode, actor David Rintoul was cast as King Aerys II Targaryen in a scene that had only been described to that point. It depicts the murder of Aerys, who is repeatedly yelling "burn them all", at the hands of Jaime Lannister.

=== Filming ===
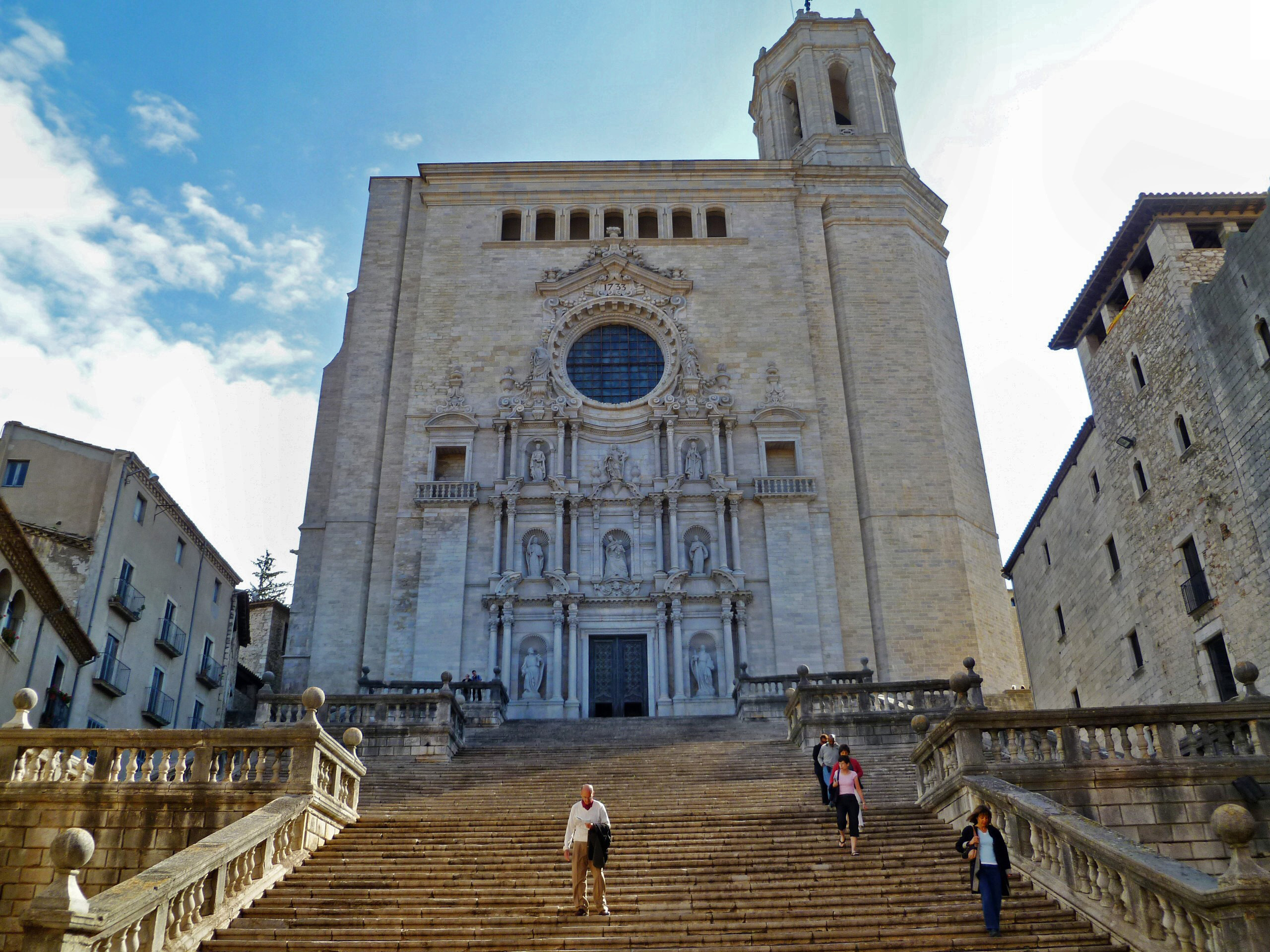
The Cathedral in Girona, Spain stood in for the Great Sept, with some extending CGI altering the building.

"Blood of My Blood" was directed by Jack Bender, who also directed the previous episode "The Door", his directorial debut for the series. Bender had been approached to direct for the series but declined due to the extensive time commitment involved in shooting, which he noted in an interview as having to commit to "four-and-a-half to six months because of the enormity of the episodes".

For the primary King's Landing scene at the Great Sept, with Margaery being presented to the city by the High Sparrow, the grand staircase of the Girona Cathedral in Girona, Spain was used. The cathedral was constructed in the 11th century, and continued its expansion throughout the 12th and 13th centuries, as well as the 18th century. According to prior reports, filming took place over the course of approximately two weeks, with many different challenges involved in shooting at the location, including "extras requiring medical attention due to exhaustion and dehydration," as well as the need for extensive security to close off certain areas, during filming, from the public. Parts of Braavos were also filmed in Girona. In nearby Canet de Mar, Catalonia, Spain, the Castell de Santa Florentina, an 11th-century medieval castle, was utilized for the castle of House Tarly.

The director of the episode, Bender, conducted an interview with The Wall Street Journal following the airing of the episode, and spoke about filming the play with Arya in Braavos, stating "I staged the whole play, we did it, and the producers came in to watch the rehearsal, including all the fart jokes, all that stuff, some of which was written. So, after we watched the rehearsal, and the guys laughed a lot, I said, 'My only concern is, am I mocking your brilliant show too much?' And they said, 'No, do it more!' They're completely unpretentious, David and Dan, and they loved it." He also noted that several other extra scenes were filmed, but were cut from the final version of the episode, noting that they will likely be released as deleted scenes on the DVD for the season.

In the behind the scenes video published by HBO following the airing of the fifth and sixth episodes, Benioff described Bran's visions at the beginning of the episode as being something that was put together very precisely and purposefully, noting "Even though some of those images flash by in just a fraction of a second each of them was very carefully chosen. And the Mad King was probably the most dramatic of those because we've been hearing about the Mad King from the very beginning of the show, but he's never appeared on screen before. And shooting it, you know, spending a lot of time on what ended up being maybe like a second and a half, couple seconds, of screen time." The new scenes of the Mad King, Aerys II Targaryen, are interspersed with previously shown footage of the White Walkers, as well as wildfire explosions, and other landmark moments from throughout the series, such as Ned Stark's beheading, the Red Wedding, and Bran falling from the Broken Tower in the series premiere. In the A Song of Ice and Fire series by George R. R. Martin, the Mad King is described as having long, unkempt hair and beard, with nine inch long fingernails. The show's version portrayed his look in a more tidy fashion, with David Rintoul playing the role of the Mad King.

Ellie Kendrick, who portrays Meera Reed in the series, in an interview with The Hollywood Reporter spoke about the reintroduction of Benjen Stark, or Coldhands Benjen, and working with Joseph Mawle, saying, "It was so fantastic. And it's interesting. If you've read the books, then you know about the Coldhands character, who was cut out of the Bran, Meera and Jojen storyline on the show. It was always interesting, having read the books, watching this amalgamation of story lines happen. Benjen is sort of like the Coldhands character in that he's a slightly suspicious guy who is half-dead and half-alive with blue hands. I thought that was very cool, the way it happened. It was a nice marriage between the book and TV revelations rolled into one. I was very excited having him on set. I loved working with Joseph Mawle, and I loved having another member of our rapidly dwindling gang."

== Reception ==
=== Ratings ===
"Blood of My Blood" was viewed by 6.71 million American households on its initial viewing on HBO, which was a modest decrease from the previous week's rating of 7.89 million viewers for the episode "The Door", likely due to the Memorial Day holiday in the United States. The episode also acquired a 3.25 rating in the 18–49 demographic, making it the highest rated show on cable television of the night. In the United Kingdom, the episode was viewed by 2.684 million viewers on Sky Atlantic, making it the highest-rated broadcast that week on its channel. It also received 0.126 million timeshift viewers.

=== Critical reception ===
"Blood of My Blood" was positively received by critics who praised the return of several notable characters from past seasons, including Benjen Stark and Walder Frey, as well as Samwell Tarly's return home to Horn Hill and Arya's decision to return to being a Stark, abandoning the teachings of the Faceless Men. It has received an 88% rating on the review aggregator website Rotten Tomatoes from 44 reviews with an average score of 7.6/10, a decrease over the previous episode. The site's consensus reads "Crucial power dynamics are reassessed and significant characters return in the skillfully plotted and gratifying "Blood of My Blood"."

Matt Fowler of IGN wrote in his review of the episode, "Some sluggish stories took better turns this week – albeit sometimes by just ending things for now – while a book character many thought would never appear on the series made a notable splash, answering a big mystery that the novels hadn’t even revealed yet in the process. There were some great moments in "Blood of My Blood", but mostly the big returns made it possible to salivate for the payoffs (and possible characters) to come." He also continued by noting, "this installment probably speaks, more than any other episode so far this season, to the accelerated rate of payoffs we're now getting that the show isn't directly following the books." Fowler gave the episode an 8.6 out of 10. Laura Prudom of Variety also praised the pacing of the episode as well as the season's payoffs, writing "There's a clarity of purpose in Season 6 that certainly gives the impression that we're barreling towards a conclusion instead of just meandering through Dorne or killing time in Qarth."

Emily St. James of Vox likewise praised the structure of the season, noting the recent absence of Ramsay Bolton as a positive, but continuing, "Though it wasn't as good as the last two episodes, "Blood of My Blood" continued the general upswing in quality Game of Thrones season six has undergone." St. James also wrote in her review, ""Blood of My Blood" is another exciting hour of television, even if it's a bit more piece move-y than, say, "The Door". The revelations are milder, the characters mostly talk about what they're going to do next, and the stories go from Point A to Point B, instead of Point X, Y, or Z. But there's still plenty going on that's worth checking out." Comparing the episode to "Book of the Stranger", Jeremy Egner of The New York Times said, "The problem with emerging naked from a flaming temple is that it's hard to top. It's hard to top, that is, unless you happen to have a dragon with a flair for dramatic timing."

Aaron Riccio of Slant Magazine criticized the episode, writing in his review "The largest problem with tonight's episode is that it either changes course so abruptly or restates certain theses so redundantly that it feels like a bit of a tease, especially to those not invested in Samwell Tarly's storyline."

=== Accolades ===
Year	Award	Category	Nominee(s)	Result	Ref.
2016	Primetime Creative Arts Emmy Awards	Outstanding Production Design for a Fantasy Program	Deborah Riley, Paul Ghirardani, Rob Cameron	Won	
2017	ADG Excellence in Production Design Award	One-Hour Single Camera Period Or Fantasy Television Series	Deborah Riley	Nominated	
