= Wild Roses (song) =

Single by Of Monsters and Men

from the album Fever Dream
- Released: 12 July 2019
- Genre: Folk
- Length: 4:02
- Label: Records
- Songwriters: Nanna Bryndís Hilmarsdóttir; Ragnar Þórhallsson
- Producers: Of Monsters and Men; Rich Costey

Of Monsters and Men singles chronology
"Alligator" (2019)	"Wild Roses" (2019)	"Wars" (2019)

Music video
- "Wild Roses" on YouTube

"Wild Roses" is a song by Icelandic indie folk group Of Monsters and Men. It was released on 12 July 2019 by Republic Records as the second single for their third studio album Fever Dream (2019). Written by Nanna Bryndís Hilmarsdóttir and Ragnar Þórhallsson and produced by Of Monsters and Men and Rich Costey, it is a folk power ballad about recovering from pain that progressively builds into a huge-sounding outro. It was a top-20 hit in Iceland but performed far weaker in North America, only spending two weeks on the Billboard Hot Rock Songs chart and peaking at 38.

== Composition ==
On Fever Dream, Of Monsters and Men introduces a bunch of electronic and synthesizer textures to their sounds. "Wild Roses" is an example of this, mixing the pace of their folk work with the production of dance hall and new wave music. Influenced by dance music and Joseph Campbell's book The Power of Myth (1988), Hilmarsdóttir went for an melancholic "introverted side" with "Wild Roses". "Wild Roses" depicts Hilmarsdóttir nervously singing in a similar haunting manner to "I of the Storm" over calm piano and strings, heavy drums, and the occasional bits of synthesizers and auto-tuned voices. Also similar to the Beneath the Skin cut "Organs", it is a folk power ballad that builds in tension to a "big finish" with a brass section. Although "Wild Roses" is an upbeat track with a pop groove, the lyrics deal with the difficulty of recovering from pain and contain imagery of vines, flying moths, and "wild roses on a bed of leaves in the month of May".

== Release ==
"Wild Roses" was released on 12 July 2019 as the second single of Fever Dream. The music video was directed by Þóra Hilmars and released on 17 October 2019. It was filmed in a swimming pool in Hafnarfjörður in 12 hours, just before the group went on the Fever Dream tour. Influenced by Scandinavian horror, the video depicts Hilmarsdóttir performing a dance routine, choreographed by Stella Rosenkranzto, in a blood-filled pool.

== Commercial performance ==
In Of Monsters and Men's native country of Iceland, "Wild Roses" debuted at number 18 and reached number 12 in its seventh week on the chart. In terms of North American Billboard rock and alternative charts, the song was the weakest-performing Fever Dreams single. It debuted at 38 on the Hot Rock Songs and only re-entered at number 41 following the release of Fever Dream, lasting for only two weeks and, unlike "Alligator" and "Wars", failing to enter the Rock Airplay, Alternative Airplay, Adult Alternative Airplay, and Canada Rock charts.

== Critical reception ==
PopMatters journalist Jordan Blum enjoyed "Wild Roses" as "celebratory but frank, with a robust and danceable backing that's quite infectious". Sean Maunier, a writer for Metro Weekly, praised the vocalists for pushing their boundaries on Fever Dream, citing "Wild Roses" as an example of the presentation of Hilmarsdóttir's versatility. Graham Kervin of Slant Magazine, however, felt the dance percussion robbed the "airy quiet" of Hilmarsdóttir's performance.

== Personnel ==
Credits adapted from the liner notes of Fever Dream.

Of Monsters and Men

- Nanna Bryndís Hilmarsdóttir – vocals, writing
- Ragnar Þórhallsson – vocals, writing
- Brynjar Leifsson – guitar, synthesizer
- Kristján Páll Kristjánsson – bass, synth bass
- Arnar Rósenkranz Hilmarsson – drums, percussion
- Steingrímur Karl Teague – piano

Other

- Rich Costey – production, mixing
- Martin Cooke – engineering
- Joe LaPorta – mastering

== Charts ==
=== Weekly charts ===
Weekly chart performance for "Wild Roses"
Chart (2019)	Peak position
Iceland (Tónlistinn)	12
US Hot Rock & Alternative Songs (Billboard)	38

=== Year-end charts ===
2019 year-end chart performance for "Wild Roses"
Chart (2019)	Position
Iceland (Tónlistinn)	94
