= Into the Woods (EP) =

EP by Of Monsters and Men
- Released: 20 December 2011
- Genre: Alternative rock
- Length: 17:45
- Language: English
- Label: Republic

Into the Woods is an EP by the Icelandic band Of Monsters and Men, released in the United States on 20 December 2011. The EP features songs from their debut album My Head Is an Animal and peaked at number 108 on the US Billboard 200.

== Track listing ==
No.	Title	Writer(s)	Length
1.	"Little Talks"	Nanna Bryndís Hilmarsdóttir; Ragnar Þórhallsson	4:27
2.	"Six Weeks"	Ragnar; Arnar Rósenkranz Hilmarsson	5:34
3.	"Love Love Love"	Nanna	4:00
4.	"From Finner"	Nanna; Ragnar; Arnar; Brynjar Leifsson	3:44
Total length:			17:45

Record Store Day Edition
No.	Title	Writer(s)	Length
4.	"From Finner" (ends at 3:44; followed by hidden song "Sinking Man")	"Sinking Man": Nanna; Ragnar	6:37

== Charts ==
Chart (2012)	Peak position
US Billboard 200	108

== Certifications ==
Certifications for Into the Woods
Region	Certification	Certified units/sales
New Zealand (RMNZ)	Platinum	15,000^{‡}
^{‡} Sales+streaming figures based on certification alone.

== Release history ==
Region	Date	Format	Label
United States	20 December 2011	10" vinyl, CD, digital download	Republic
United States	21 April 2012	10" vinyl (Record Store Day Edition)	Republic
