= Visitor (song) =

Single by Of Monsters and Men
- Released: 9 September 2020
- Length: 3:27
- Label: Republic
- Songwriters: Nanna Bryndís Hilmarsdóttir; Ragnar Þórhallsson
- Producers: Of Monsters and Men

Of Monsters and Men singles chronology
"Wars" (2019)	"Visitor" (2020)	"Destroyer" (2021)

Music video
- "Visitor" on YouTube

"Visitor" is a song by Icelandic group Of Monsters and Men, released on 9 September 2020. The song was critically well-received and charted on various Billboard rock and airplay charts, in particularly giving Of Monsters and Men their fifth number-one hit on the Adult Alternative Airplay chart.

== Background and composition ==
"Visitor" is Of Monsters and Men's first single since the release of their third studio album Fever Dream (2019). In addition to a positive critical reception, the album was number one on the Billboard Top Rock Albums chart, a top-ten hit on the Billboard 200, and had a number-one single on the Adult Alternative Airplay chart with "Alligator". According to vocalist Nanna Bryndís Hilmarsdóttir, "Visitor" is about alienation, only being able to observe the real world without any connection to it, hence the metaphor of being a "visitor at your parents' house".

The song and its music video were released on 9 September 2020. The video was directed by Thora Hilmars and filmed in Iceland in February 2020, just before the COVID-19 pandemic began. The video goes back and forth between shots of the group performing live and an old man dancing at the concert and walking in nature during sunrise. A remix by MUNA was released on 9 October 2020.

== Reception ==
Indiependent highlighted "Visitor"'s mixture of indie and pop elements with an aggressive tone, where "the catchy guitar and drums are paired with vocals that are both electric and beautifully delicate at the same time". The webzine Euphoria called "Visitor" "compulsively listenable, energetic, and sensual", and noted Hilmarsdóttir's nuance in her performance, and QRO called it "a soaring piece of uplift". Global News named it one of "5 songs you must hear this week", and DuJour listed it on their "top five new favorite songs released this week". In Of Monsters and Men's country of Iceland, "Visitor" debuted at number 21 and last only three weeks in the top 40. The track also appeared on the following Billboard charts for only one week each: number 48 on the Hot Rock & Alternative Songs, seven on Rock Digital Song Sales, and 11 on Alternative Digital Song Sales. By 9 October 2020, the song had been streamed more than four million times worldwide.

In terms of Billboard's rock and airplay charts, "Visitor" performed far better, lasting for around 16–20 weeks each. It had been the greatest gainer on the Alternative Airplay and Adult Alternative Airplay charts within a month of its release. On the week on 12 December 2020, it reached number one on the Adult Alternative Songs chart, making it the group's fifth topper of the chart and the first since "Alligator"; it was also at number 27 on the Rock Airplay, having already established its number 26 peak, with a new high of weekly impressions for the song, 1.7 million. On the Alternative Airplay chart, it reached number 24. It also was a top-ten hit on the Canada Rock chart.

== Charts ==
=== Weekly charts ===
Weekly chart performance for "Visitor"
Chart (2020–2021)	Peak position
Canada Rock (Billboard)	10
Iceland (Tónlistinn)	21
US Hot Rock & Alternative Songs (Billboard)	48
US Rock & Alternative Airplay (Billboard)	26

=== Year-end charts ===
2021 year-end chart performance for "Visitor"
Chart (2021)	Position
US Adult Alternative Airplay (Billboard)	48
