= All Is Love and Pain in the Mouse Parade =

Studio album by Of Monsters and Men
- Released: 17 October 2025
- Genres: Indie rock; indie folk
- Length: 53:37
- Label: Skarkali
- Producers: Of Monsters and Men; Peter Katis

Of Monsters and Men chronology
Fever Dream (2019)	All Is Love and Pain in the Mouse Parade (2025)

Singles from All Is Love and Pain in the Mouse Parade
- 1. "Television Love" Released: 1 July 2025; 2. "Ordinary Creature" Released: 7 August 2025

All Is Love and Pain in the Mouse Parade is the fourth studio album by Icelandic band Of Monsters and Men. It was released on 17 October 2025 through Skarkali Records, marking the band's return after a six-year hiatus since their previous full-length album, Fever Dream (2019). The album explores themes of love, pain, loneliness, and connection through atmospheric folk-rock soundscapes and poetic storytelling.

== Background ==
The album's title is derived from the closing track "Mouse Parade", which tells a surreal story of mice inhabiting a vacant house during winter. Lead singer Nanna Bryndís Hilmarsdóttir described the song as "a little bit of an odd one out," yet emblematic of the album's emotional duality.

== Artwork ==
The cover art for All Is Love and Pain in the Mouse Parade was designed by singer and guitarist Ragnar Þórhallsson, in collaboration with graphic designer Davíð Arnar Baldursson. It features abstract, muted visuals that reflect the album’s introspective tone and surreal themes.

== Reception ==
The album received positive reviews from critics, who praised its introspective tone and sonic evolution. When the Horn Blows described it as "the band's most introspective and sonically polished work to date", highlighting its atmospheric textures and emotional nuance. Apple Music noted the album's surreal storytelling and emotional vulnerability. Genius listed the full track lyrics and credited the band's songwriting as "a tapestry of stories, moments, and conversations".

== Track listing ==
All Is Love and Pain in the Mouse Parade track listing
No.	Title	Writer(s)	Length
1.	"Television Love"	Nanna Bryndís Hilmarsdóttir; Ragnar Þórhallsson; Arnar Rósenkranz Hilmarsson	4:40
2.	"Dream Team"	Nanna; Ragnar; Arnar	3:08
3.	"The Actor"	Nanna; Ragnar	4:33
4.	"Tuna in a Can"	Nanna; Ragnar	3:06
5.	"Barefoot in Snow"	Nanna; Ragnar	3:36
6.	"Fruit Bat"	Nanna; Ragnar; Arnar	8:17
7.	"Kamikaze"	Nanna; Ragnar; Arnar	3:32
8.	"The Towering Skyscraper at the End of the Road"	Nanna; Ragnar; Arnar	3:34
9.	"Ordinary Creature"	Nanna; Ragnar; Arnar	3:40
10.	"Styrofoam Cathedral"	Nanna; Ragnar; Brynjar Leifsson	3:53
11.	"The Block"	Nanna; Ragnar; Arnar	4:26
12.	"Mouse Parade"	Nanna; Arnar	4:34
13.	"The End"	Nanna; Ragnar	2:38
Total length:			53:37

== Personnel ==
=== Of Monsters and Men ===
- Nanna Bryndís Hilmarsdóttir – vocals, guitar
- Ragnar Þórhallsson – vocals, guitar
- Brynjar Leifsson – guitar
- Kristján Páll Kristjánsson – bass
- Arnar Rósenkranz Hilmarsson – drums, percussion

=== Additional musicians ===
- Steingrímur Karl Teague – keyboards
- Ragnhildur Gunnarsdóttir – trumpet, keyboards
- Josh Kaufman – 12-string guitar (tracks 3, 6)

=== Technical ===
- Of Monsters and Men – producer
- Peter Katis – mixing; producer (tracks 1, 6, 9)
- Greg Calbi – mastering

=== Artwork and design ===
- Davíð Arnar Baldursson – graphic design
- Ragnar Þórhallsson – graphic design

== Charts ==
=== Weekly charts ===
Weekly chart performance for All Is Love and Pain in the Mouse Parade
Chart (2025)	Peak position
French Rock & Metal Albums (SNEP)	65
German Rock & Metal Albums (Offizielle Top 100)	16
Icelandic Albums (Tónlistinn)	14
Irish Independent Albums (IRMA)	8
Scottish Albums (Official Charts)	11
Swiss Albums (Schweizer Hitparade)	58
UK Albums (Official Charts)	16
UK Independent Albums (Official Charts)	3
US Top Current Album Sales (Billboard)	36
