= Alligator (Of Monsters and Men song) =

Single by Of Monsters and Men

from the album Fever Dream
- Released: 3 May 2019
- Genre: Indie rock; punk rock; folk-pop; electronic rock
- Length: 3:04
- Label: Republic
- Songwriter: Nanna Bryndís Hilmarsdóttir
- Producers: Of Monsters and Men; Rich Costey

Of Monsters and Men singles chronology
"Wolves Without Teeth" (2016)	"Alligator" (2019)	"Wild Roses" (2019)

Music video
- "Alligator" on YouTube

"Alligator" is a song by Icelandic indie folk group Of Monsters and Men. It was released on 3 May 2019 by Republic Records as the lead single for their third studio album Fever Dream (2019). Written by Nanna Bryndís Hilmarsdóttir and produced by the band and Rich Costey, "Alligator" is an uplifting yet aggressive indie rock, folk-pop, punk rock and electronic rock track about trying to break free from disillusion and confusion. Although its high energy, drums and forceful vocal performances recall the group's early sound, it is absent of their typical folk stylings. "Alligator" was well received by reviewers of Fever Dream, who expressed disappointment that most of the album did not follow its style and sound. In addition to being a top-ten hit in the band's home country of Iceland, it was also in the top ten of various North American Billboard rock and alternative charts and reached number-one on the Rock Airplay and Adult Alternative Airplay charts.

== Background and release ==
"Alligator" was released on 3 May 2019. The release of the single was preceded by the group teasing it on their social media with alligator-related imagery. As Nanna Bryndís Hilmarsdóttir announced upon release, "We are so excited about Alligator, the first release from our upcoming album. The song very much speaks to the excitement and energy that we feel about being back. We can't wait to share more music and see everyone again." An official music video, filmed in two days "inside one of Iceland’s most haunted hotels" according to Nanna, was released on 2 July 2019. It depicts the singer having a fever dream about a hotel with the other members wearing masks.

The group performed "Alligator" on The Tonight Show with Jimmy Fallon on 16 May 2019, Jimmy Kimmel Live! on 31 July 2019, and The Ellen DeGeneres Show on 24 September 2019. They also performed the song on Night Two of KROQ's Absolut Almost Acoustic Christmas 2019, alongside "Mountain Sound", "Wars", and "Little Talks"; and Triple J's Like a Version where they also played a cover of Post Malone's "Circles".

== Composition ==
"Alligator" is an exultant yet aggressive indie rock, folk-pop, punk rock and electronic rock song in the style of Chvrches and with elements of 1980s power pop. Over a thick, pounding bass line, buzzing, hazy guitars a la Yeah Yeah Yeahs and "ominous, drifting, shapeshifting drums", Nanna, in a stressful and anthemic manner, calls for liberation from the feelings of disillusion and confusion. As she belts in the chorus, "Wake me up / I'm fever dreaming / And now I lose control / I'm fever dreaming / Shake it out / It's just a-what I’m feeling / And now I take control / I'm fever dreaming!"

Critics had dissimilar views over how similar "Alligator" sounded in comparison to their previous works. Some were reminded of the band's early sound through the song's "pulsating" and "hypnotic" drum beat, high energy, and forceful vocal performance. Others found it different to the point of being unrecognizable as a song from Of Monsters and Men, primarily due to its malicious tone. While the debut album My Head Is an Animal (2011) established an upbeat folk pop sound for the group and Beneath the Skin (2015) introduced guitar rock elements to it, "Alligator" is stripped of those records' folk stylings.

== Critical reception ==
Several critical reviews of Fever Dream considered "Alligator" to be the album's best track. Sophia Simon-Bishall of The Line of Best Fit enjoyed it as "startling and thrilling", but also claimed it promised a diverse sound that the rest of the track list failed to live up to. DIY's Louisa Dixon and Slant Magazine's Graham Kervin were disappointed most of Fever Dream followed a forgettable pop style instead of the "arena-ready punchiness" and powerful vocals of "Alligator". Paste's Andy Crump enjoyed "Alligator" as a "banger" and lamenting that "if, from start to finish, the whole record worked half as well as 'Alligator,' it’d be a bold new chapter in Of Monsters and Men's narrative". More negatively, PopMatters journalist Jordan Blum compared "Alligator" to "the latter-day stylistic deviations of Muse and Pure Reason Revolution". He argued that it is "catchy and iridescent enough to appeal in a commercial sense", but was absent of "almost all of what makes Of Monsters and Men exceptional in the first place", finding it similar to "countless generic empowerment anthems residing within modern pop music".

== Commercial performance ==
On the Icelandic Singles Chart, "Alligator" debuted at number nine and rose to its peak of number six in its second week. On the Billboard issue dated 13 July 2019, "Alligator" was at number four on the magazine's Rock Airplay chart, garnering 6.7 million listens according to Nielsen Music. Also that week, it went from 2–1 on the Adult Alternative Airplay chart, remaining at its peak for two weeks. This notched Of Monsters and Men a fourth number one on the chart, following "Crystals", "Mountain Sound", and "Little Talks". Reaching number-one in the ninth week, it also broke a record for a song by the Icelandic group with the lowest amount of weeks to get to the top; the previous holder was "Crystal" with ten weeks.

Upon Fever Dream's release, "Alligator" bolted from 15–9 on the Hot Rock Songs chart. This made it the second top-ten hit on the chart for "Of Monsters and Men" since "Little Talks" peaked number three in July 2012. In the issue dated 24 August 2019, "Alligator" became the band's first Rock Airplay chart topper, launching from 4–1 as a result of to its 8.8 million impressions, 9% higher than that of the previous week. Of Monsters and Men became the second act in 2019 to notch a Rock Airplay number-one for the first time, after Shaed with "Trampoline" in July. It was also the band third's Rock Airplay hit, after the number-two-peaking "Mountain Sound" and the top-three "Little Talks". Also on 24 August, "Alligator" went from 6–3 on the Alternative Songs; at the time, they were the only group with a song in the top five on the chart, as mostly solo acts were in the chart's top five.

== Personnel ==
Credits adapted from the liner notes of Fever Dream.

Of Monsters and Men

- Nanna Bryndís Hilmarsdóttir – vocals, writing
- Ragnar Þórhallsson – vocals
- Brynjar Leifsson – guitar, synthesizer
- Kristján Páll Kristjánsson – bass, synth bass
- Arnar Rósenkranz Hilmarsson – drums, percussion

Other

- Rich Costey – production, mixing
- Martin Cooke – engineering
- Joe LaPorta – mastering

== Charts ==
=== Weekly charts ===
Weekly chart performance for "Alligator"
Chart (2019)	Peak position
Canadian Digital Song Sales (Billboard)	50
Canada Rock (Billboard)	3
China Airplay/FL (Billboard)	29
Czech Republic (Modern Rock)	20
Iceland (Tónlistinn)	6
US Hot Rock & Alternative Songs (Billboard)	8
US Rock Airplay (Billboard)	1

=== Year-end charts ===
2019 year-end chart performance for "Alligator"
Chart (2019)	Position
Iceland (Tónlistinn)	89
US Hot Rock & Alternative Songs (Billboard)	29
US Rock Airplay (Billboard)	9
