= Fever Dream (Of Monsters and Men album) =

Studio album by Of Monsters and Men
- Released: 26 July 2019
- Genres: Electronica; indie folk; stadium rock
- Length: 40:30
- Label: Republic
- Producers: Of Monsters and Men; Rich Costey

Of Monsters and Men chronology
Beneath the Skin (2015)	Fever Dream (2019)	All Is Love and Pain in the Mouse Parade (2025)

Singles from Fever Dream
- 1. "Alligator" Released: 3 May 2019; 2. "Wild Roses" Released: 12 July 2019

Fever Dream (stylized in all caps) is the third studio album by Icelandic band Of Monsters and Men, released on 26 July 2019 through Republic Records. The album was co-produced by the band with Rich Costey, and was preceded by the lead single "Alligator".

== Background ==
Lead singer Nanna Bryndís Hilmarsdóttir said that while writing the album she had grown "really tired" of writing songs on an acoustic guitar as it "brought out things in [me] that were predictable", so she began working on a laptop at home, "figuring out all these new sounds and being curious about them". Nanna said lead single "Alligator", called "driving and percussion-heavy" by Billboard, began like a "dance song", but that it is not entirely representative of the album's sound. She described the album as "more poppy and brighter" than the band's previous album, 2015's Beneath the Skin.

== Reception ==
=== Critical reception ===
Professional ratings
Aggregate scores
Source	Rating
Metacritic	70/100
Review scores
Source	Rating
AllMusic	4/5 stars
DIY	2.5/5 stars
The Irish Times	3/5 stars
The Independent	3/5 stars
Paste	6.3/10
Sputnikmusic	4.2/5

Fever Dream received generally positive reviews from music critics. At Metacritic, which assigns a normalized rating out of 100 to reviews from mainstream critics, the album received an average score of 70, based on 12 reviews, which indicates "generally favorable reviews".

=== Commercial performance ===
Fever Dream debuted at number nine on the US Billboard 200 with 34,000 album-equivalent units, of which 30,000 were pure album sales. It is Of Monsters and Men's third US top 10 album.

== Track listing ==
Fever Dream track listing
No.	Title	Writer(s)	Length
1.	"Alligator"	Nanna Bryndís Hilmarsdóttir	3:04
2.	"Ahay"	Nanna; Ragnar Þórhallsson; Arnar Rósenkranz Hilmarsson	2:56
3.	"Róróró"	Nanna	4:20
4.	"Waiting for the Snow"	Nanna	3:43
5.	"Vulture, Vulture"	Nanna; Ragnar	2:56
6.	"Wild Roses"	Nanna; Ragnar	4:02
7.	"Stuck in Gravity"	Nanna; Ragnar; Arnar	4:24
8.	"Sleepwalker"	Nanna; Ragnar; Arnar	3:20
9.	"Wars"	Nanna; Ragnar	3:38
10.	"Under a Dome"	Nanna; Ragnar; Arnar	4:33
11.	"Soothsayer"	Nanna; Arnar	3:34
Total length:			40:30

== Personnel ==
=== Of Monsters and Men ===
- Nanna Bryndís Hilmarsdóttir – vocals, guitar, piano, keyboards, percussion
- Ragnar Þórhallsson – vocals, guitar, piano, synthesizer, keyboards
- Brynjar Leifsson – guitar, synthesizer
- Kristján Páll Kristjánsson – bass, synthesizer
- Arnar Rósenkranz Hilmarsson – drums, percussion, programming, synthesizer, piano

=== Additional musicians ===
- Steingrimur Karl Teague – piano (tracks 2, 4, 5, 6, 9)
- Viktor Orri Árnason – strings (tracks 4, 10)

=== Technical ===
- Of Monsters and Men – producer
- Rich Costey – producer, mixing, programming
- Joe LaPorta – mastering
- Martin Cooke – engineering, programming
- KT Pipal – mixing assistance

=== Artwork and design ===
- Davíð Arnar Baldursson – design, layout
- Ragnar Þórhallsson – design, layout
- Jón Sæmundur – paintings

== Charts ==
=== Weekly charts ===
Weekly chart performance for Fever Dream
Chart (2019)	Peak position
Australian Albums (ARIA)	21
Austrian Albums (Ö3 Austria)	55
Belgian Albums (Ultratop Flanders)	81
Belgian Albums (Ultratop Wallonia)	79
Canadian Albums (Billboard)	2
French Albums (SNEP)	132
German Albums (Offizielle Top 100)	29
Icelandic Albums (Plötutíóindi)	1
Italian Albums (FIMI)	90
Scottish Albums (Official Charts)	8
Spanish Albums (Promusicae)	54
Swiss Albums (Schweizer Hitparade)	13
UK Albums (Official Charts)	15
US Billboard 200	9
US Top Alternative Albums (Billboard)	2
US Top Rock Albums (Billboard)	1
US Indie Store Album Sales (Billboard)	11

=== Year-end charts ===
2019 year-end chart performance for Fever Dream
Chart (2019)	Position
Icelandic Albums (Plötutíóindi)	39
