= The Broken Man =

- Game of Thrones episode
- Episode no.: Season 6 Episode 7
- Directed by: Mark Mylod
- Written by: Bryan Cogman
- Cinematography by: P. J. Dillon
- Editing by: John Harris
- Original air date: June 5, 2016
- Running time: 50 minutes

Guest appearances
- Ian McShane as Brother Ray; Diana Rigg as Olenna Tyrell; Clive Russell as Brynden Tully; Tobias Menzies as Edmure Tully; Gemma Whelan as Yara Greyjoy; Faye Marsay as the Waif; Jóhannes Haukur Jóhannesson as Lem; Tim McInnerny as Robett Glover; Ian Whyte as Wun Wun; Hafþór Júlíus Björnsson as Gregor Clegane; Tim Plester as Walder Rivers; Daniel Tuite as Lothar Frey; Ricky Champ as Gatins; Ian Davies as Morgan; Murray McArthur as Dim Dalba; Hannah Waddingham as Septa Unella; Bella Ramsey as Lyanna Mormont

Episode chronology
← Previous "Blood of My Blood"	Next → "No One"
- Game of Thrones season 6

"The Broken Man" is the seventh episode of the sixth season of HBO's fantasy television series Game of Thrones, and the 57th overall. The episode was written by Bryan Cogman, and directed by Mark Mylod.

Sandor "the Hound" Clegane lives a peaceful life with the pacifist community of Brother Ray; Jon Snow, Sansa Stark and Davos Seaworth attempt to build an army; Margaery Tyrell convinces her grandmother to leave the capital despite Cersei's appeal to stay; Jaime Lannister attempts to negotiate with the Blackfish; and Arya Stark is ambushed in Braavos.

"The Broken Man" garnered high praise from critics, who noted the long-awaited return of Sandor Clegane, the introduction of new characters such as Lyanna Mormont, and the siege of Riverrun as highlights of the episode. The title of the episode is a reference to a speech given by Septon Meribald, a character in the A Song of Ice and Fire series, who was also used to create the character of Ray. In the United States, the episode achieved a viewership of 7.80 million in its initial broadcast. The episode earned a nomination at the 68th Primetime Emmy Awards for Outstanding Production Design for a Fantasy Program.

== Plot ==
=== In the North ===
Jon, Sansa, and Davos secure the allegiance of the Wildlings after Tormund reminds them of their debt to Jon for saving them at Hardhome and points out that the Boltons will wipe them out if they do nothing. They also secure the allegiance of House Mormont but they only secure a small number of men. However, they are unable to secure the allegiance of House Glover, with Lord Robett Glover pointing out how Robb Stark failed to protect his home and family from the Ironborn. They are only able to add a few hundred extra soldiers to the army, but Jon insists that they attack Winterfell as soon as possible before the Boltons rally more forces and the weather turns on them. Sansa, unable to change his mind, begins writing a letter to an unknown party.

=== In King's Landing ===
The High Sparrow chides Margaery that she should try to convert Olenna to the Faith, implying that Olenna's safety cannot be guaranteed otherwise. Margaery meets with Olenna, who attempts to convince her to leave King's Landing and return to Highgarden. Margaery insists that her place is supposed to be at Tommen's side, and discreetly slips Olenna a piece of paper with the sigil of House Tyrell drawn on it, indicating that she is still loyal to her family. After this, Olenna agrees to leave.

Cersei confronts Olenna and tries to convince her to stay and fight the Sparrows. Olenna points out that they have already lost and blames the Sparrows' rise to power on Cersei's lack of foresight. Despite having no allies in King's Landing, Cersei decides to stay and fight.

=== In Free Cities ===
Theon and Yara take the Iron Fleet to Volantis to take on supplies. Yara encourages Theon to regain his confidence to help her retake the Iron Islands, and reveals that she plans to take the Iron Fleet to Meereen and forge an alliance with Daenerys before Euron reaches her.

In Braavos, Arya secures passage back to Westeros, but is subsequently attacked by the Waif, in the guise of an elderly woman. Arya escapes by jumping into a canal, but is left critically wounded.

=== In the Riverlands ===
Jaime and Bronn lead the Lannister army to Riverrun and witness the Blackfish calling Lothar Frey and Walder Rivers' bluff when they threaten to execute Edmure before they take Edmure down from the gallows. Disgusted with the incompetence, Jaime takes charge of the siege and parleys with the Blackfish. He is unintimidated by Jaime's threats and declares that they have enough supplies to last 2 years, daring him to take the castle.

The Hound is revealed to have survived his fight with Brienne and is now living with his rescuer, a warrior turned septon named Ray, and a band of villagers constructing a sept. A trio of men from the Brotherhood without Banners arrives and attempt to extort the villagers but leave upon finding out that they have no worthwhile possessions. The Hound warns Ray that they will return, but he refuses to prepare for a confrontation. The Hound leaves to gather wood but hears screaming and returns to find the villagers slaughtered and Ray hanged. Enraged, The Hound picks up an axe and marches off in search of the men.

== Production ==
=== Writing ===
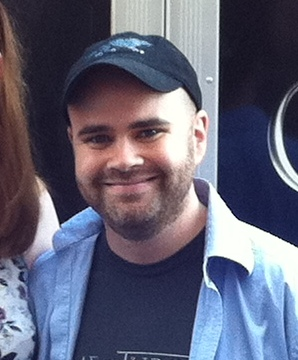
Series veteran Bryan Cogman wrote the episode, his second of two episodes of the season.

"The Broken Man" was written by Bryan Cogman. his second of two episodes for the season, the first being the previous episode, "Blood of My Blood". It also adapts the chapter "Jaime VI" from A Feast for Crows. The title of the episode is in reference to a speech given by Septon Meribald, a character in the A Song of Ice and Fire series, who was also used to create the character of Ray. In an interview with Entertainment Weekly, Cogman stated, "The speech itself didn't make it into the episode, but it inspired the character and some of his dialogue. So the title of the episode is a nod to that speech." He compared it to the second season episode "The Ghost of Harrenhal", whose title was also a reference to the books, but was not specifically stated in the episode. Ian McShane, who portrayed Ray, spoke about the writing in the episode in regards to his participation in the series, noting, "they wrote a two-page speech – so that's why they invited me. It’s a big soliloquy, like in Deadwood, and they needed to get somebody who could do that. It was really well written."

In the "Inside the Episode" featurette published by HBO shortly after the airing of "The Broken Man", series co-creators David Benioff and D. B. Weiss spoke about some of the thought process behind the motivations of the characters that were featured prominently in the episode. David Benioff began by speaking about Sandor "the Hound" Clegane, saying "I think suffering a near death experience probably changes anyone, and that certainly has changed Sandor Clegane. He's a more thoughtful person than he was when we last saw him, he's probably more aware of his vulnerabilities, he knows how close he came to dying, and he's really thinking about his past in a way that he never had before." Weiss continued, "The unfortunate, ugly reality of the kind of pacifism that Ray is preaching is often suicidal when you're in the middle of the kind of world that they're all in. Something sad about the fact that this person who tried desperately to walk away from what he was is being given no real choice but to go full throttle back in the direction of what he really is, which is a killer."

Weiss additionally spoke about the introduction of Lyanna Mormont in the series, with Weiss saying, "We were excited about the prospect of the character because she's mentioned in passing in the previous season," referring to her letter to Stannis denying him men, and swearing fealty to House Stark. Weiss added, "The more we thought about it, Jon is going to come up against so many old guys with beards in the North that like 'What if she was a tougher audience?' It seemed like an inherently fun scene to watch, it also is terrifying because it's putting a lot of dramatic weight on the shoulders of somebody who needs to be very young." David Benioff concluded the featurette speaking about the Ironborn story, noting "Yara's not a therapist, in our kind of sense of the word, she's not there to tell him to 'buck up' and 'everything's going to be okay,' it's a pretty brutal kind of therapy, but that's who they are, I mean they're essentially a Viking people. There's not a lot of room for sort of soft, and gentle psychology. I think it's the kind of tough love Theon needed at this point, and when he finally raises his eyes, and looks into her eyes, we see a glimpse of the old Theon that had been lost for so long."

In regards to the various stories throughout the episode, and the amount of time passing in each one of them, Cogman stated, "The timelines between the various storylines don’t necessarily line up within a given episode. For instance, the “Northern Tour” Jon and Sansa embark on would probably take a couple weeks, but Arya's storyline over the past few episodes only spans a few days. We realized a while ago that if we tied ourselves in knots trying to make all the “story days” line up between all the characters the momentum would suffer."

The episode is only the fourth in the series with a cold open. The first three being the series premiere, "Winter Is Coming", the third season premiere "Valar Dohaeris", and the fourth season premiere, "Two Swords". Bryan Cogman stated that they felt it was necessary to utilize a pre-credits sequence due to the reintroduction of Rory McCann, saying "We figured it would make his reveal more impactful if the audience hadn't seen [McCann's] name in the opening credits first."

=== Casting ===
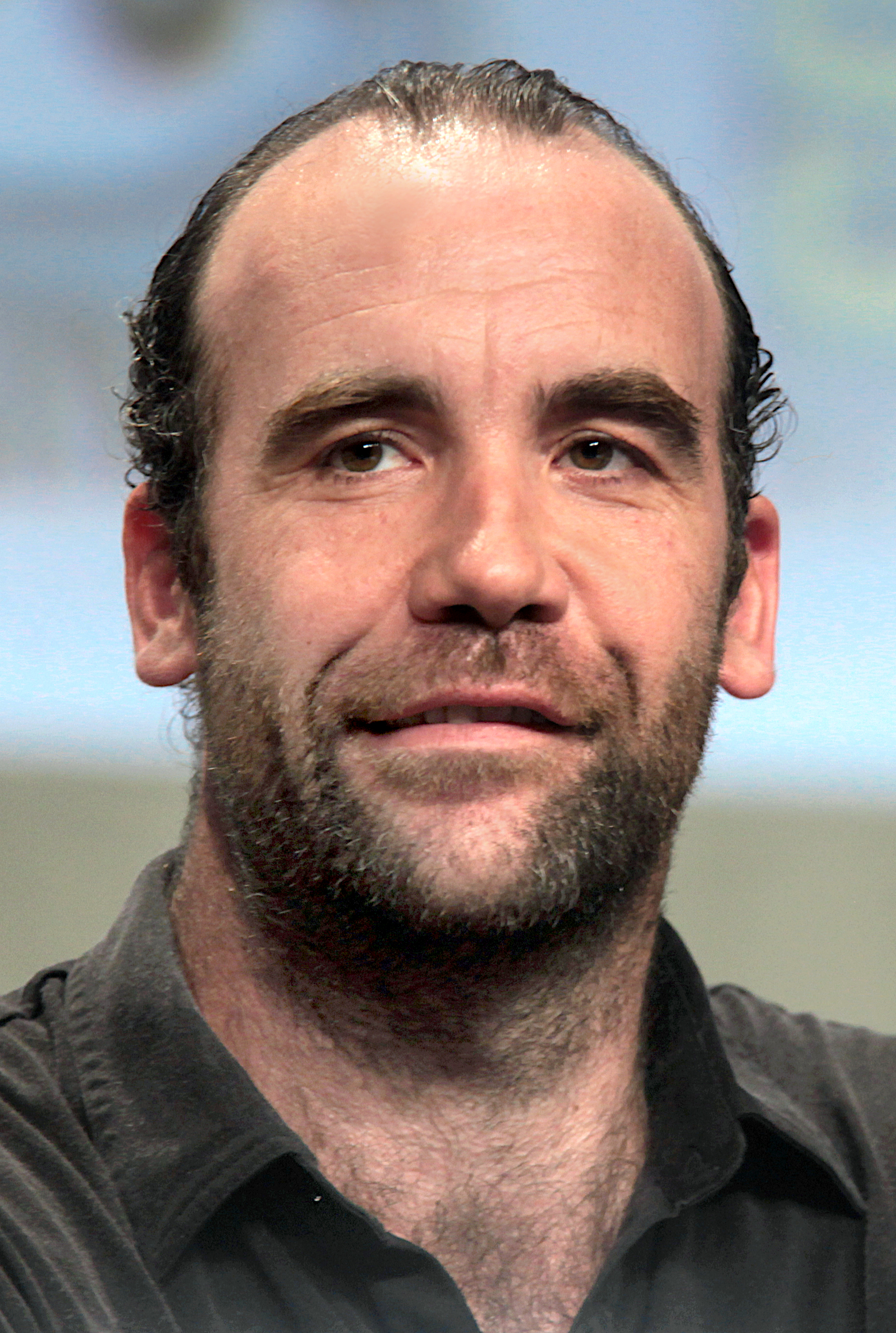
Actor Rory McCann returned as a series regular in his role as Sandor "the Hound" Clegane, last appearing in the season four finale.

The episode featured the return of several characters from previous seasons, as well as the introduction of new characters, who were either mentioned previously within the show, or had some connection to an established character. Rory McCann, who portrayed Sandor "the Hound" Clegane from the beginning of the series through the fourth-season finale episode "The Children", returned as a series regular. McCann had previously speculated about the return of the Hound, saying in an interview with Access Hollywood in 2014, "There's always hope." Bryan Cogman revealed in an interview with Entertainment Weekly that there was always a plan to bring back the Hound, but the manner in which he was reintroduced was not always entirely known.

Another re-introduction involved the storyline surrounding the Siege of Riverrun, with actor Clive Russell returning to the show as Brynden "the Blackfish" Tully, who last appeared in the third-season episode "The Rains of Castamere", in which the Red Wedding took place, and the Blackfish successfully evaded. In an interview with IGN, Clive Russell stated he was hopeful to return to the role saying "I'd hoped that he'd come back because he comes back in the books again. But they're not doing the books -- there is no book to do it from. I'd hoped that would happen. I don't think I was surprised it would happen because they bring back all kinds of people at all kinds of times. But it was good to go back there, I must say."

Ian McShane, who previously starred in the HBO television series Deadwood, guest starred in the episode as Ray. His casting for the series was announced in August 2015. At the time, McShane described his role in the show as the leader of a peace cult, who was also a former warrior that has since renounced violence, also noting that it was a "complete one-off." McShane also revealed that his character would "bring back a much-loved character everybody thinks is dead," leading many to speculate prior to the season that he would either play a role in bringing back Jon Snow, or the Hound, whose fate had also been called into question since his disappearance. McShane was asked about whether there was pressure involved with joining a show that has become an "international hit," with McShane responding "No pressure! It's the most popular TV show in the world, isn't it? I enjoyed meeting showrunners David Benioff and Dan Weiss – nobody ever expects the kind of reaction this has gotten. It's kind of like Deadwood when we started off, but they've managed to go another three seasons. It's interesting because you're a part of the show, but you're not part of the show. I only needed Rory for my scenes, so I didn't meet anybody else in it." Bryan Cogman stated that the character of Ray was a combination of several different characters from the A Song of Ice and Fire series, most evidently the Elder Brother, and Septon Meribald.

With Jon Snow, Sansa Stark, and Davos Seaworth's attempt to unite the North against the Boltons, two different House leaders were cast to portray Lyanna Mormont and Robett Glover, with Bella Ramsey and Tim McInnerny portraying each character, respectively. Cogman noted about Bella Ramsey, "Bella is a terrific young actress – the whole cast and crew were very impressed. I think, much like the character does with Jon, Sansa, and Davos, Bella kept Kit, Sophie, and Liam on their toes!"

Jerome Flynn, who portrays Bronn in the series, made his first appearance in the season, last appearing in the season five finale episode "Mother's Mercy".

=== Filming ===
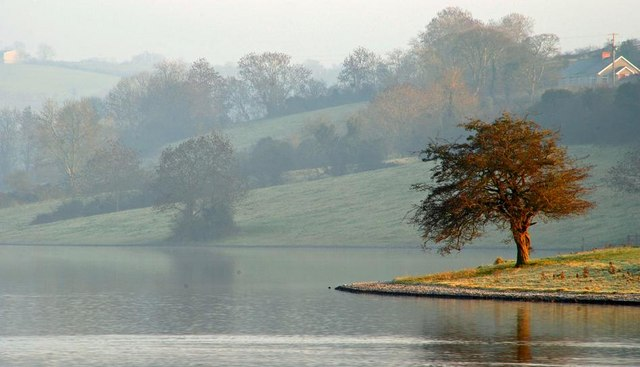
The sequences at Riverrun were filmed in Corbet, County Down, Northern Ireland.

"The Broken Man" was directed by Mark Mylod. Mylod previously directed the fifth season episodes "High Sparrow" and "Sons of the Harpy". Mylod also directed the subsequent episode, "No One", for the sixth season.

Filming of the Riverrun sequence began in October 2015, and led to some complaints by locals living in the area following the construction of a portion of the Tully castle. The shooting of the scenes took place in Corbet, County Down, Northern Ireland. Due to some concerns over the size of the structure, filming was unable to take place until local inspectors were able to determine if the production unit followed what had been agreed upon in the "planning application." Construction of a portion of the castle began in September, with tents and wooden additions being added shortly after.

In an interview with Entertainment Weekly, Ian McShane was asked about the process of shooting his final scene where he is shown hanging after being killed by the Brotherhood, with McShane saying that the filming of the scene was "very easy. You just have to hold your breath for 10 seconds and look sufficiently dead for them to get it." He also noted in the interview, "Rory was a delight to work with, and so was the director. The whole experience was five days in Belfast, and I enjoyed it a lot." Prior to the season, in August 2015, reports emerged about the spotting of Rory McCann at a hotel frequented by actors during filming of the series, in Belfast. McCann, whose character is frequently shown chopping wood in the episode, previously spoke in interviews about his prior career with chopping down trees, revealing "I was a lumberjack for years, [...] and I even trained myself to be a tree surgeon."

Maisie Williams also spoke with Entertainment Weekly and described the process behind Arya's scenes, saying "We wanted people to think this could be the end, or the start of the end. Like maybe her wound is going to fester – like The Hound. We did so many different takes of emerging out of the water the first time she's stabbed and sliced. I had been to a music festival so I hadn't slept the whole weekend. Then I was jumping in the Irish sea. It was a totally manic day. We did a million different takes. We wanted it to be real frantic and panicked. Arya hasn't been emotional in a long time and we wanted to bring that emotion."

== Reception ==
=== Ratings ===
"The Broken Man" was viewed by 7.80 million American households on its initial viewing on HBO, which was a significant increase from the previous week's rating of 6.71 million viewers for the episode "Blood of My Blood", a low that was attributed to the Memorial Day weekend in the United States. The episode also acquired a 3.95 rating in the 18–49 demographic, making it the highest rated show on cable television of the night. In the United Kingdom, the episode was viewed by 2.720 million viewers on Sky Atlantic, making it the highest-rated broadcast that week on its channel. It also received 0.133 million timeshift viewers.

=== Critical reception ===
"The Broken Man" was positively received by critics, who listed the return of Sandor "The Hound" Clegane, the introduction of Lyanna Mormont, and the siege of Riverrun as high points for the episode. It has received a 98% rating on the review aggregator website Rotten Tomatoes from 46 reviews with an average score of 7.8/10. The site's consensus reads "The return of long-lost characters and the introduction of some sharply-drawn newcomers keep "The Broken Man" from feeling like mere setup for the season finale."

Matt Fowler of IGN wrote in his review for the episode, ""The Broken Man" gave us back The Hound, but his return felt a little diminished, given the parade of returns we've already seen this year, and there weren't as many notable moments in this chapter as other Game of Thrones episodes. There were some fine scenes, but nothing on par with the show's usual goods, though Lady Mormont was a highlight and Jaime and the Blackfish's standoff is an interesting scenario, not to mention the questions raised by Sansa's letter. Emily St. James of Vox says Bella Ramsey was "a delight" and turns in an absolutely scene-stealing performance. Arya getting her guts punctured was a shocker, but it didn't feel right that she couldn't see her attacker coming." He gave the episode an 8 out of 10.

Alan Sepinwall of HitFix praised the episode structure, writing "The quick transitions and constant back-and-forth movement among subplots generated more energy that, when combined with several characters we either didn't know before or hadn't seen in a long time, made "The Broken Man" feel livelier." Similarly, Ed Power of The Daily Telegraph also praised the episode, noting, "Once again there was a sense Game of Thrones was steeling itself for battles - and expensive set-pieces - chugging down the track. A storm is brewing - for now, we were invited to enjoy what remains of the calm." Jen Chaney of Vulture also felt the episode was more of a set up episode for storylines to be resolved in the close of the season, writing "Although two bombs get dropped in this week's episode of Game of Thrones, it's an hour focused on putting the narrative chess pieces into place. "The Broken Man" doesn't finish off any of its major moves. Those bold turns are yet to come."

=== Accolades ===
Year	Award	Category	Nominee(s)	Result	Ref.
2016	Primetime Creative Arts Emmy Awards	Outstanding Production Design for a Fantasy Program	Deborah Riley, Paul Ghirardani, Rob Cameron	Won	
2017	ADG Excellence in Production Design Award	One-Hour Single Camera Period Or Fantasy Television Series	Deborah Riley	Nominated	
