= Ricky Champ =

British actor (b. 1980)

- Born: 1 July 1980 (age 45); Southend-on-Sea, Essex, England
- Occupation: Actor
- Years active: 2005–present
- Known for: EastEnders; Him & Her
- Spouse: Samantha Gilbert (m. 2016)
- Children: 2

Ricky Champ (born 1 July 1980) is an English actor. He is known for his roles as Paul Parker in the BBC Three sitcom Him & Her, and Stuart Highway in the BBC soap opera EastEnders. Champ has also appeared in Crims, Plebs, and the sixth series of HBO series Game of Thrones where he played Gatins. In 2023, he joined the West End play 2:22 A Ghost Story at the Apollo theatre.

== Filmography ==
=== Film ===
| Year | Title | Role | Notes |
|---|---|---|---|
| 2006 | Driving Lessons | Tough Looking Man | |
| 2007 | Hotel Very Welcome | Josh | |
| 2013 | The World's End | Big Ugly Bastard | |
| 2013 | Titus | Not Malick | |
| 2015 | Mortdecai | Sergei | |
| 2015 | A Royal Night Out | Tough Soldier | |
| 2016 | AmStarDam | Branislav | |
| 2017 | Lost in London | Cab Driver | |
| 2025 | A Working Man | Nestor | |

=== Television ===
| Year | Title | Role | Notes |
|---|---|---|---|
| 2005 | Family Affairs | Geoff Hardcastle | 2 episodes |
| 2006 | The Bill | Barney Ford | Episode: "The Wrong Man" |
| 2009 | EastEnders | Photographer | |
| 2009 | Doc Martin | Paramedic | Episode: "Better the Devil" |
| 2010 | Rev. | Scaffolder | Episode #1.1 |
| 2010 | Law & Order: UK | Rob Denton | Episode: "Broken" |
| 2010–2013 | Him & Her | Paul | 23 episodes |
| 2012 | The Royal Bodyguard | Lock | Episode: "The Royal Art of Blackmail" |
| 2012 | Casualty | Mark Burton | Episode: "Appropriate Force" |
| 2012 | Dead Boss | Frank | 6 episodes |
| 2013–2014 | Youngers | Clint | 9 episodes |
| 2015 | Crims | Creg | 6 episodes |
| 2015 | Jekyll and Hyde | One Eye | 2 episodes |
| 2015 | Peter and Wendy | Bill Dukes/ Malik | Television film |
| 2016 | Plebs | Hector | Episode: "The Crimewave" |
| 2016 | Game of Thrones | Gatins | Episodes: "The Broken Man" and "No One" |
| 2017 | Tracey Ullman's Show | Various | 3 episodes |
| 2017 | Harlots | Hay | Episode #1.3 |
| 2017 | Stan Lee's Lucky Man | Bill Martin | Episode: "The Fallen Angel" |
| 2017 | Absentia | Charles Avallone | 3 episodes |
| 2018 | Grandpa's Great Escape | Gravedigger Butch | Television film |
| 2018–2022, 2025 | EastEnders | Stuart Highway | Main role |
| 2024 | Suspect | Carter | Episode: "Alistair" |
| 2024 | The Decameron | Mangy Bandit | 2 episodes |
| 2024 | Piglets | Daz | 12 episodes |
| 2025 | The Witcher | Toothless | Episodes "Dream of a Wish Fulfilled", "Trail by Ordeal", "A Sermon of Survival" |

== Awards and nominations ==
| Year | Award | Category | Result | Ref. |
|---|---|---|---|---|
| 2018 | Inside Soap Awards | Best Bad Boy | Shortlisted | |
| 2018 | I Talk Telly Awards | Best Soap Newcomer | Nominated | |
| 2019 | 24th National Television Awards | Newcomer | Nominated | |
| 2019 | TV Choice Awards | Best Soap Actor | Nominated | |
| 2019 | The British Soap Awards | Villain of the Year | Nominated | |
| 2019 | The British Soap Awards | Best Newcomer | Nominated | |
| 2019 | Inside Soap Awards | Best Bad Boy | Shortlisted | |
| 2020 | Inside Soap Awards | Funniest Performance | Nominated | |
| 2021 | Inside Soap Awards | Best Partnership (shared with Tanya Franks) | Nominated | |
