= Art Directors Guild Awards 2016 =

Annual US film and television awards ceremony

21st Art Directors Guild Awards
- Date: February 11, 2017

The 21st Art Directors Guild Excellence In Production Design Awards, took place on February 11, 2017, at the Hollywood & Highland Center Ray Dolby Ballroom in Hollywood, honoring the best production designers of 2016. Nominations were announced on January 5.

== Winners and nominees ==
=== Film ===
Period Film:

- Wynn Thomas – Hidden Figures
  - Santo Loquasto – Café Society
  - David Gropman – Fences
  - Barry Robinson – Hacksaw Ridge
  - Jess Gonchor – Hail, Caesar!
  - Jean Rabasse – Jackie

Fantasy Film:

- Guy Hendrix Dyas – Passengers
  - Patrice Vermette – Arrival
  - Charles Wood – Doctor Strange
  - Stuart Craig – Fantastic Beasts and Where to Find Them
  - Doug Chiang and Neil Lamont – Rogue One: A Star Wars Story

Contemporary Film:

- David Wasco – La La Land
  - Tom Duffield – Hell or High Water
  - Chris Kennedy – Lion
  - Ruth De Jong – Manchester by the Sea
  - Shane Valentino – Nocturnal Animals

=== Television ===
One-Hour Period or Fantasy Single-Camera Television Series:

- Nathan Crowley – Westworld (for "The Original")
  - Martin Childs – The Crown (for "Wolferton Splash", "Hyde Park Corner", "Smoke and Mirrors")
  - Deborah Riley – Game of Thrones (for "Blood of My Blood", "The Broken Man", "No One")
  - Drew Boughton – The Man in the High Castle (for "The Tiger's Cave", "Land O' Smiles", "Fallout")
  - Chris Trujillo – Stranger Things (for "Chapter One: The Vanishing of Will Byers", "Chapter Three: Holly, Jolly", "Chapter Eight: The Upside Down")

One-Hour Contemporary Single-Camera Television Series:

- Anastasia White – Mr. Robot (for "eps2.0_unm4sk-pt1.tc", "eps2.4_m4ster-slave.aes", "eps2.9_pyth0n-pt1.p7z")
  - Tony Fanning – Better Call Saul (for "Inflatable", "Fifi", "Klick")
  - Tim Galvin – Bloodline (for "Part 16", "Part 21")
  - Steve Arnold – House of Cards (for "Chapter 41", "Chapter 47", "Chapter 48")
  - Dave Blass – Preacher (for "See", "South Will Rise Again", "Finish the Song")

Half Hour Single-Camera Television Series:

- Tommaso Ortino – Mozart in the Jungle (for "Now I Will Sing")
  - Bruce Robert Hill – The Last Man on Earth (for "Pitch Black", "The Power of Power", "Mama's Hideaway")
  - Richard Toyon – Silicon Valley (for "Two in the Box", "Bachmanity Insanity", "Daily Active Users")
  - Cat Smith – Transparent (for "If I Were a Bell")
  - Jim Gloster – Veep (for "Kissing Your Sister")

Multi-Camera Series:

- Glenda Rovello – The Great Indoors (for "Pilot")
  - Glenda Rovello – 2 Broke Girls (for "And the 80's Movie", "And the Godmama Drama", "And the Two Openings: Part Two")
  - Greg Grande – Baby Daddy (for "Love & Carriage", "Room-Mating", "Stupid Cupid")
  - John Shaffner – The Big Bang Theory (for "The Positive Negative Reaction", "The Big Bear Precipitation", "The Fermentation Bifurcation")
  - John Shaffner – The Ranch (for "Leavin's Been Comin' (For a Long, Long Time)")

Television Movie or Limited Series:

- Patrizia von Brandenstein – The Night Of (for "The Beach")
  - Andrew Murdock – American Horror Story: Roanoke (for "Chapter 4")
  - Joel Collins, James Foster, and Nicholas Palmer – Black Mirror (for "Nosedive", "Playtest", "San Junipero")
  - Jeffrey Mossa – The People v. O. J. Simpson: American Crime Story (for "100% Not Guilty", "Marcia, Marcia, Marcia", "Manna from Heaven")
  - Arwel W. Jones – Sherlock: The Abominable Bride

Variety, Reality or Competition Series:

- Keith Raywood, Eugene Lee, Akira Yoshimura, and N. Joseph DeTullio – Saturday Night Live (for "Larry David/The 1975", "Peter Dinklage/Gwen Stefani", "Tom Hanks/Lady Gaga")
  - Mercedes Younger – American Grit (for "Ruck Up")
  - Karen Weber – The Ellen DeGeneres Show (for "Ellen's Halloween Show")
  - Schuyler Telleen – Portlandia (for "Weirdo Beach")
  - Eugene Lee and Peter Baran – The Tonight Show Starring Jimmy Fallon (for "Ep. 0417", "Ep. 0461", "Ep. 0493")
  - Anton Goss and James Pearse Connelly – The Voice (for "The Blind Auditions, Part 3", "The Battles Premiere, Part 2")

Awards or Event Special:

- Hannah Beachler – Beyoncé: Lemonade
  - Tamlyn Wright and Baz Halpin – 68th Primetime Emmy Awards
  - David Korins – Grease: Live
  - Derek McLane – Hairspray Live!
  - Derek McLane – The Oscars

Short Format: Web Series, Music Video or Commercial:

- James Chinlund – "iPhone 7: Balloons"
  - Ruth De Jong – "Adidas: Basketball Needs Creators"
  - JC Molina – Beyoncé: Lemonade: "6 Inch"
  - Jason Hougaard – Beyoncé: Lemonade: "Denial"
  - Jason Hougaard – Beyoncé: Lemonade: "Hold Up"
