= Of Monsters and Men =

Icelandic folk rock band

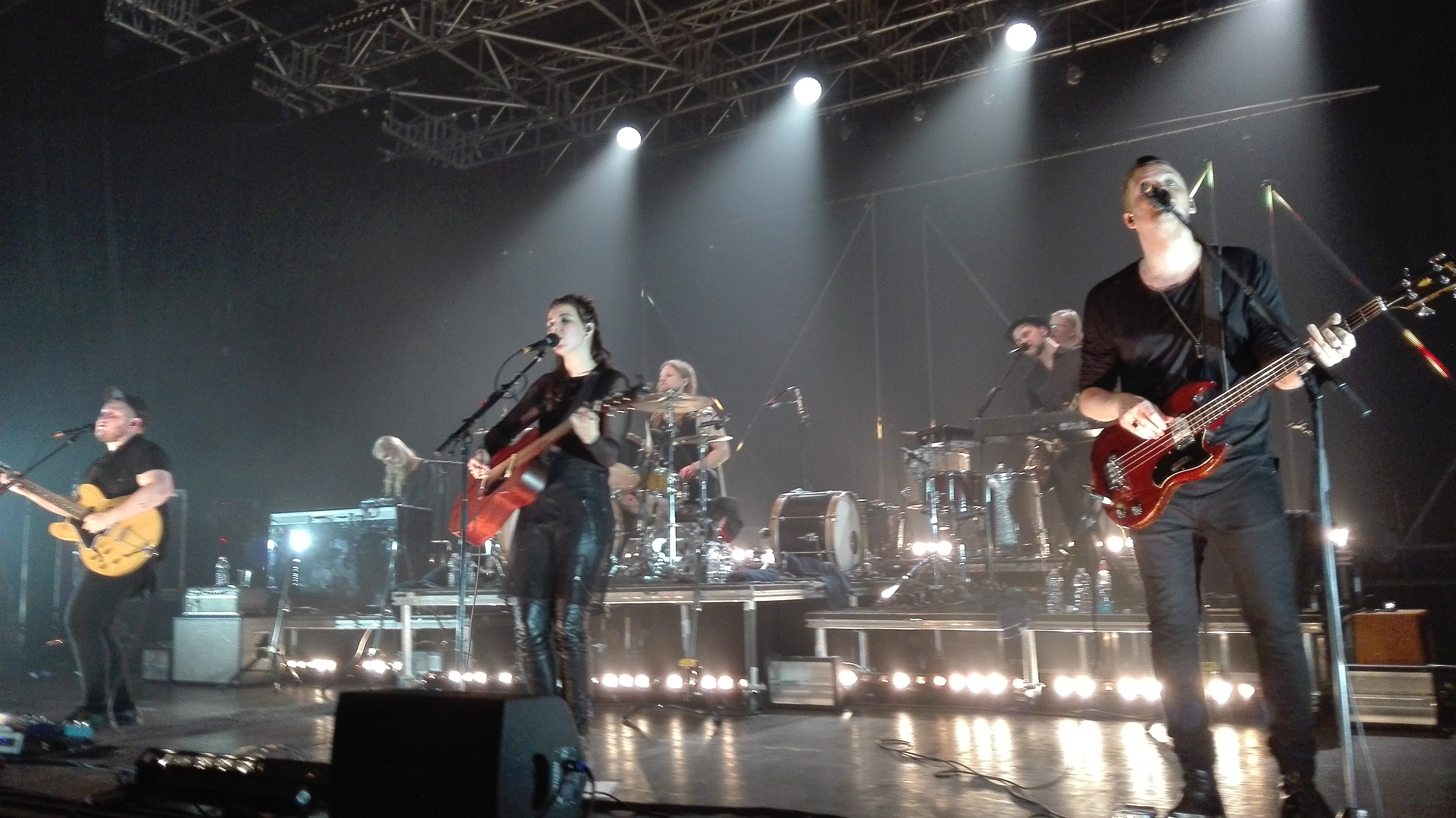
- Of Monsters and Men performing in 2015

Background information
- Origin: Garðabær, Iceland
- Genres: Indie folk; chamber pop; folk pop; folk rock; indie rock
- Works: Discography
- Years active: 2010–present
- Labels: Record; Republic
- Members: Nanna Bryndís Hilmarsdóttir; Ragnar Þórhallsson; Brynjar Leifsson; Kristján Páll Kristjánsson; Arnar Rósenkranz Hilmarsson
- Past members: Árni Guðjónsson
- Website: ofmonstersandmen.com

Of Monsters and Men is an Icelandic indie folk/rock band formed in Garðabær in 2010. It consists of lead singer and guitarist Nanna Bryndís Hilmarsdóttir, singer and guitarist Ragnar "Raggi" Þórhallsson, lead guitarist Brynjar Leifsson, drummer Arnar Rósenkranz Hilmarsson, and bassist Kristján Páll Kristjánsson.

The band has released four studio albums: My Head Is an Animal (2011), Beneath the Skin (2015), Fever Dream (2019), and All Is Love and Pain in the Mouse Parade (2025). They achieved commercial success with their 2011 hit single "Little Talks", which reached the top 10 of the charts in several countries and no. 20 on the Billboard Hot 100.

In 2010, Of Monsters and Men won the Músíktilraunir, an annual Battle of the Bands in Iceland. They won the European Border Breakers Awards in 2013.

== History ==
=== 2009–2010: Formation and early work ===
Of Monsters and Men was formed in 2010 when singer, guitarist, and pianist Nanna Bryndís Hilmarsdóttir, who originally performed solo under the name Songbird, asked friends Brynjar Leifsson (electric guitar) and Ragnar "Raggi" Þórhallsson (backing vocals, melodica, glockenspiel) to help her perform. They were invited to play at Músíktilraunir, an annual music competition in Iceland, at which point Arnar Rósenkranz Hilmarsson (backing vocals, melodica, glockenspiel, tambourine) joined the band. As a quartet, they won the competition. Raggi came up with the band name, as an allusion to reading fairytales and telling stories growing up.

They were invited to perform at the 2010 Iceland Airwaves festival and added two more members, Árni Guðjónsson (accordion/keyboards, backing vocals) and Kristján Páll Kristjánsson (bass, backing vocals), to make the sound bigger for the show.

Shortly thereafter, Seattle-based radio station KEXP recorded them performing the song "Little Talks" from Raggi's living room. The recording went viral in the United States, and the band credited this to the popularity of the English folk rock group Mumford & Sons at the time.

=== 2011–2013: My Head Is an Animal ===
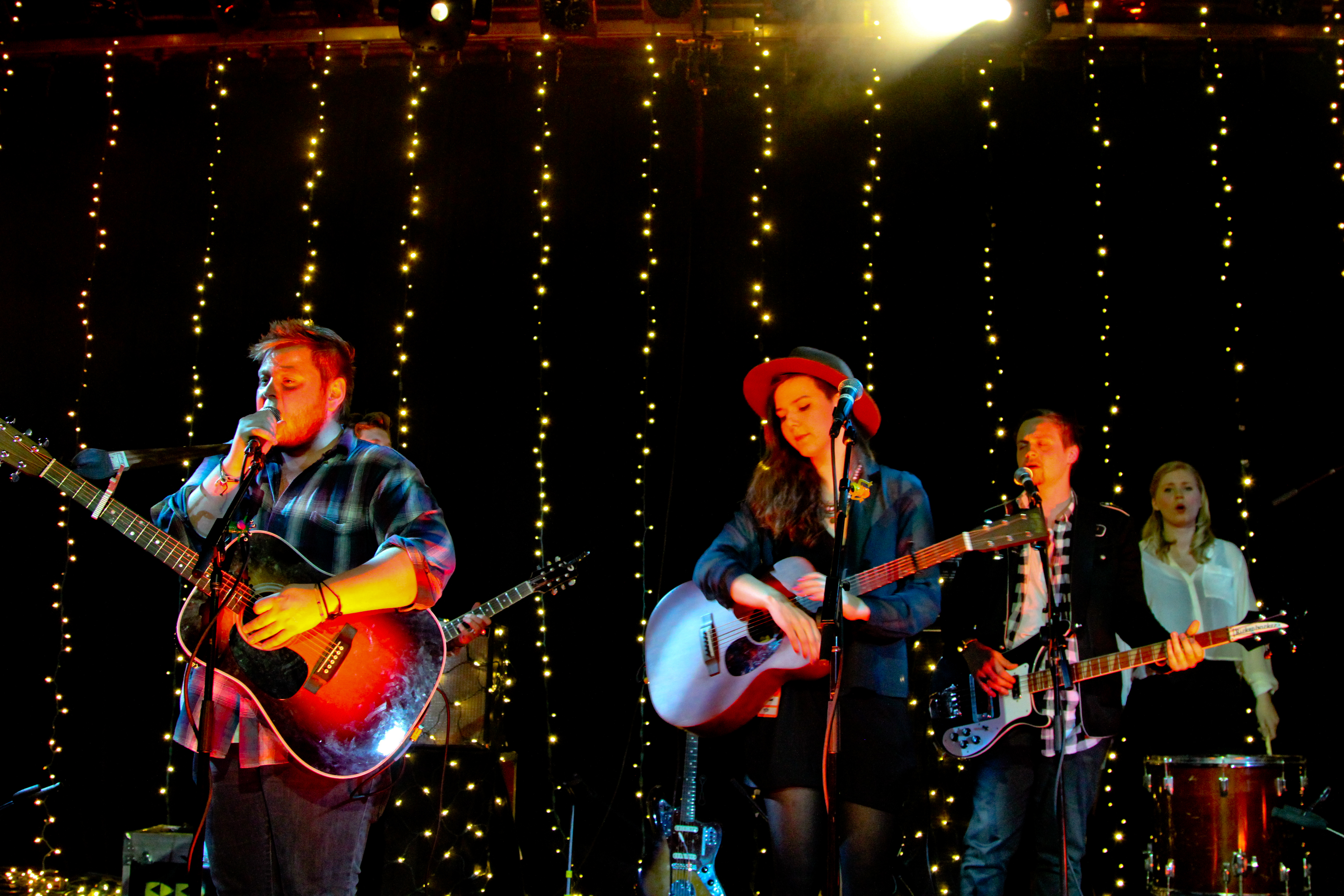
Of Monsters and Men performing in New York City in April 2012

Of Monsters and Men signed with Record Records in February 2011, and in March, they began recording their debut album at Studio Sýrland, in Reykjavík. In August, Philadelphia's Radio 104.5 began playing their debut single, "Little Talks", and propelled the band to nationwide popularity.

The finished album, My Head Is an Animal, was released in Iceland in September 2011, and it reached no. 1, as did "Little Talks". With success in Iceland and growing popularity in the United States, the band signed with Universal Music Group for a worldwide release of the record.

Of Monsters and Men released the EP Into the Woods in December 2011, which featured four songs from their debut album. They also issued My Head Is an Animal in the US in April 2012.

In 2012, the band performed at the Newport Folk Festival, Osheaga, and Lollapalooza. They also played at the Reading and Leeds Festivals. On 5 October 2012, the group was featured on the PBS music show Sound Tracks: Music Without Borders, performing the song "Mountain Sound".

In late 2012, Árni left the band, saying he didn't find it exciting playing "Little Talks" five times per day.

Of Monsters and Men played at the first annual Boston Calling Music Festival in May 2013, and the same year, they performed at Glastonbury Festival.

Their song "Dirty Paws" was featured in the iPhone 5 introduction video, released in September 2012, as well as in the trailer for the 2013 film The Secret Life of Walter Mitty. "Sinking Man" was featured on The Walking Dead: Original Soundtrack – Vol. 1, released in March 2013, and "Silhouettes" was included in The Hunger Games: Catching Fire soundtrack, which came out in November 2013.

=== 2014–2018: Beneath the Skin ===
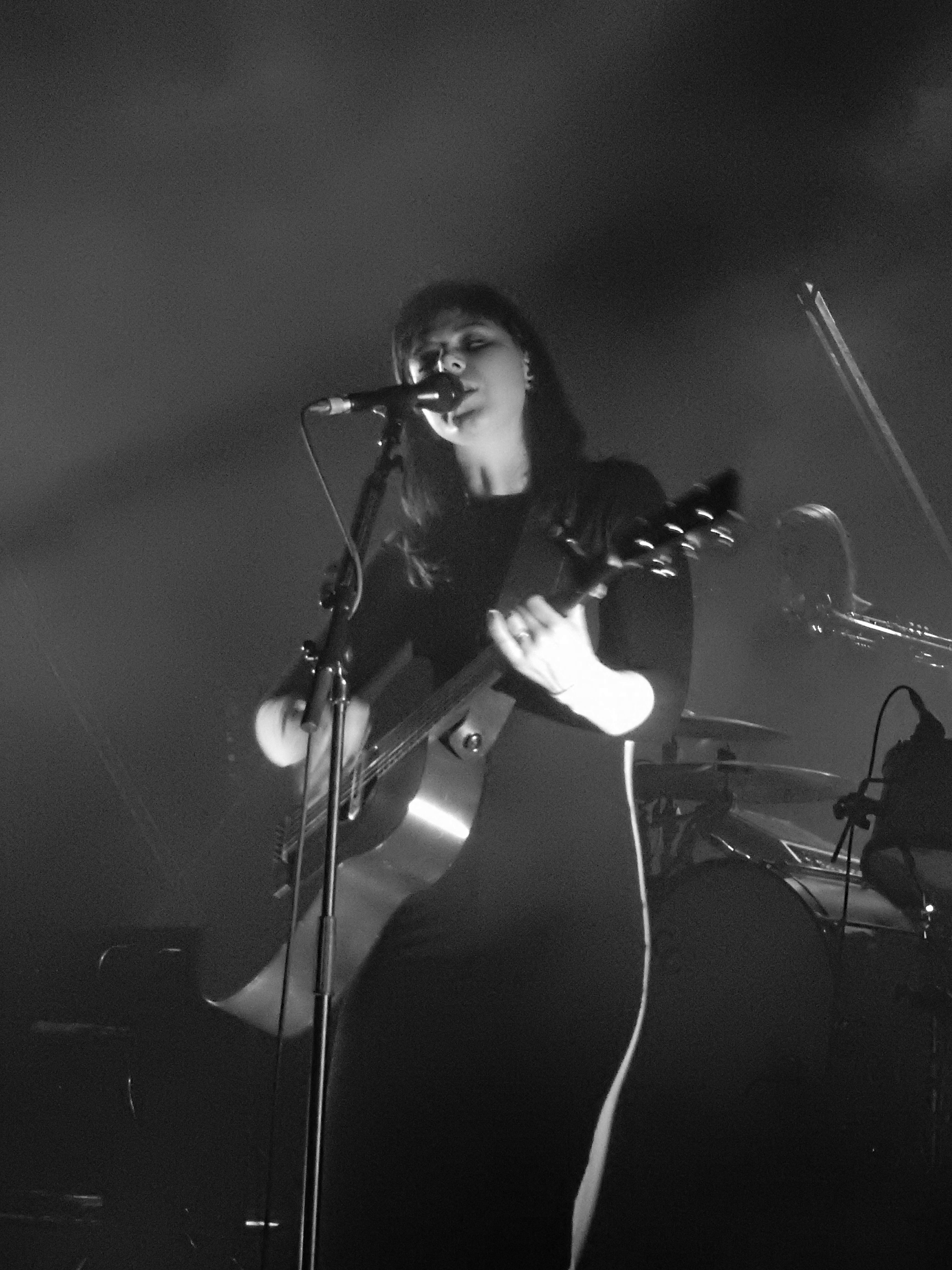
Nanna Bryndís Hilmarsdóttir in 2015

Of Monsters and Men began working on a new album in August 2013, starting the recording process in November 2014. The album's first single, "Crystals", was released in March 2015. The album, Beneath the Skin, came out in June 2015. The artwork for the record and its singles was created by artist Leif Podhajsky. In October 2015, the track "Thousand Eyes" was featured in the pre-season advertising for the TV series Jessica Jones.

In 2015, the band toured North America. The same year, they appeared in a cameo on the episodes "The Door" and "Blood of My Blood" of Game of Thrones, as stage musicians.

In October 2017, Of Monsters and Men became the first Icelandic group to reach one billion streams on Spotify.

=== 2019–2023: Fever Dream and Tíu ===
In May 2019, Of Monsters and Men released "Alligator", the first single from their third album, Fever Dream, which came out in July. The record was produced by Rich Costey. It reached no. 1 on the Billboard Top Rock Albums chart.

In July 2019, they released the single "Wild Roses".

On 9 September 2020, the band unveiled the new single "Visitor", along with a music video. This was followed by "Destroyer" in April 2021.

At the 2022 Tribeca Festival, the band released the documentary Tíu ("ten" in the Icelandic language), a film celebrating the ten-year anniversary of My Head Is an Animal. It was directed by Dean DeBlois and featured the band playing songs outdoors in Iceland during the COVID-19 pandemic. It was accompanied by an EP of the same name.

In December 2024, the band signed with Red Light Management.

=== 2025–present: All Is Love and Pain in the Mouse Parade ===
In July 2025, Of Monsters and Men issued the song "Television Love", their first original release in three years. In August, they previewed their new album, All Is Love and Pain in the Mouse Parade, with the song "Ordinary Creature". The album came out in October 2025.

== Band members ==
Current

- Nanna Bryndís Hilmarsdóttir – lead vocals, rhythm guitar, piano, organ (2010–present)
- Ragnar Þórhallsson – lead vocals, rhythm guitar, melodica, glockenspiel (2010–present)
- Brynjar Leifsson – lead guitar, melodica, percussion, backing vocals (2010–present)
- Kristján Páll Kristjánsson – bass guitar, percussion, backing vocals (2010–present)
- Arnar Rósenkranz Hilmarsson – drums, percussion, melodica, glockenspiel, accordion, keyboard, piano, acoustic guitar, backing vocals (2010–present)

Past

- Árni Guðjónsson – accordion, piano, organ, keyboards, backing vocals (2010–2012)

Touring musicians

- Ragnhildur Gunnarsdóttir – trumpet, accordion, keyboards, piano, percussion, backing vocals (2010–present)
- Steingrimur Karl Teague – piano, keyboards, organ, accordion, backing vocals (2012–present)
- Bjarni Þór Jensson – rhythm guitar, percussion, keyboards (2015–present)
- Sigrún Kristbjörg Jónsdóttir – trombone, percussion, accordion (2015–present)

== Discography ==
Studio albums

- My Head Is an Animal (2011)
- Beneath the Skin (2015)
- Fever Dream (2019)
- All Is Love and Pain in the Mouse Parade (2025)

== Awards and nominations ==
Year	Organization	Nominated work	Award	Result
2012	MTV Video Music Awards	"Little Talks"	Best Art Direction	Nominated
2012	MTV Europe Music Awards	Of Monsters and Men	Best Push Act	Nominated
2013	ECHO Awards	My Head Is an Animal	Best International Newcomer	Nominated
2013	ECHO Awards	My Head Is an Animal	Best International Rock/Pop Group	Nominated
2013	Juno Awards	"Little Talks"	Video of the Year	Nominated
2013	Billboard Music Awards	My Head Is an Animal	Top Rock Album	Nominated
2013	EBBA Awards	My Head Is an Animal	European Border Breakers Award	Won
2015	Icelandic Music Awards	Crystals	Pop Song of the Year	Won
2015	Icelandic Music Awards	Of Monsters and Men	Live Performer of the Year	Won
