= Brynjar Leifsson =

Icelandic musician (born 1990)

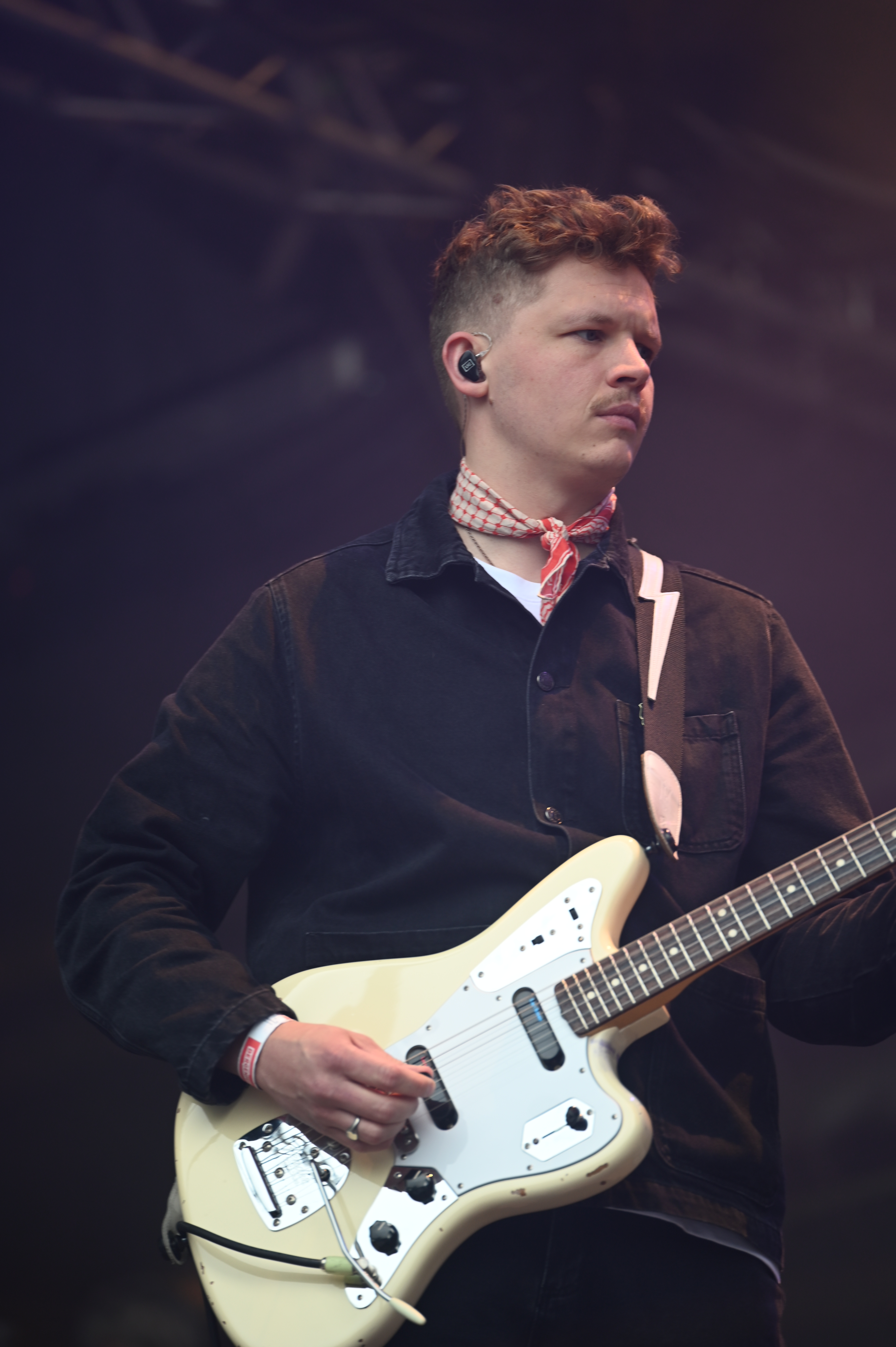
- Brynjar in 2026

Background information
- Born: 11 September 1990 (age 35); Iceland
- Genres: Indie pop; indie rock; indie folk; folk rock; acoustic
- Occupations: Musician; guitarist; singer; songwriter
- Instruments: Guitar; melodica; tambourine; vocals
- Years active: 2009–present
- Member of: Of Monsters and Men

Brynjar Leifsson (born 11 September 1990) is an Icelandic musician. He is best known as the lead guitarist of the Icelandic indie folk band Of Monsters and Men.

== Personal life ==
Brynjar was raised in Keflavík, a town in southwest Iceland. His brother is a pilot.

Brynjar has been in a relationship with musician Ragnhildur Gunnarsdóttir, who is also a touring member of Of Monsters and Men, since at least 2014. The two have a son named Hilmir Hrafn Brynjarsson.

== Of Monsters and Men ==
Brynjar joined Nanna Bryndís Hilmarsdóttir's solo project, Songbird in 2009. The project soon expanded with Ragnar Þórhallsson and Arnar Rósenkranz Hilmarsson joining. The band then entered the 2010 annual Icelandic music competition Músíktilraunir, which they won. The band eventually became Of Monsters and Men.

== See also ==
- List of Icelandic writers
- Icelandic literature
