= Nanna Bryndís Hilmarsdóttir =

Icelandic musician (born 1989)

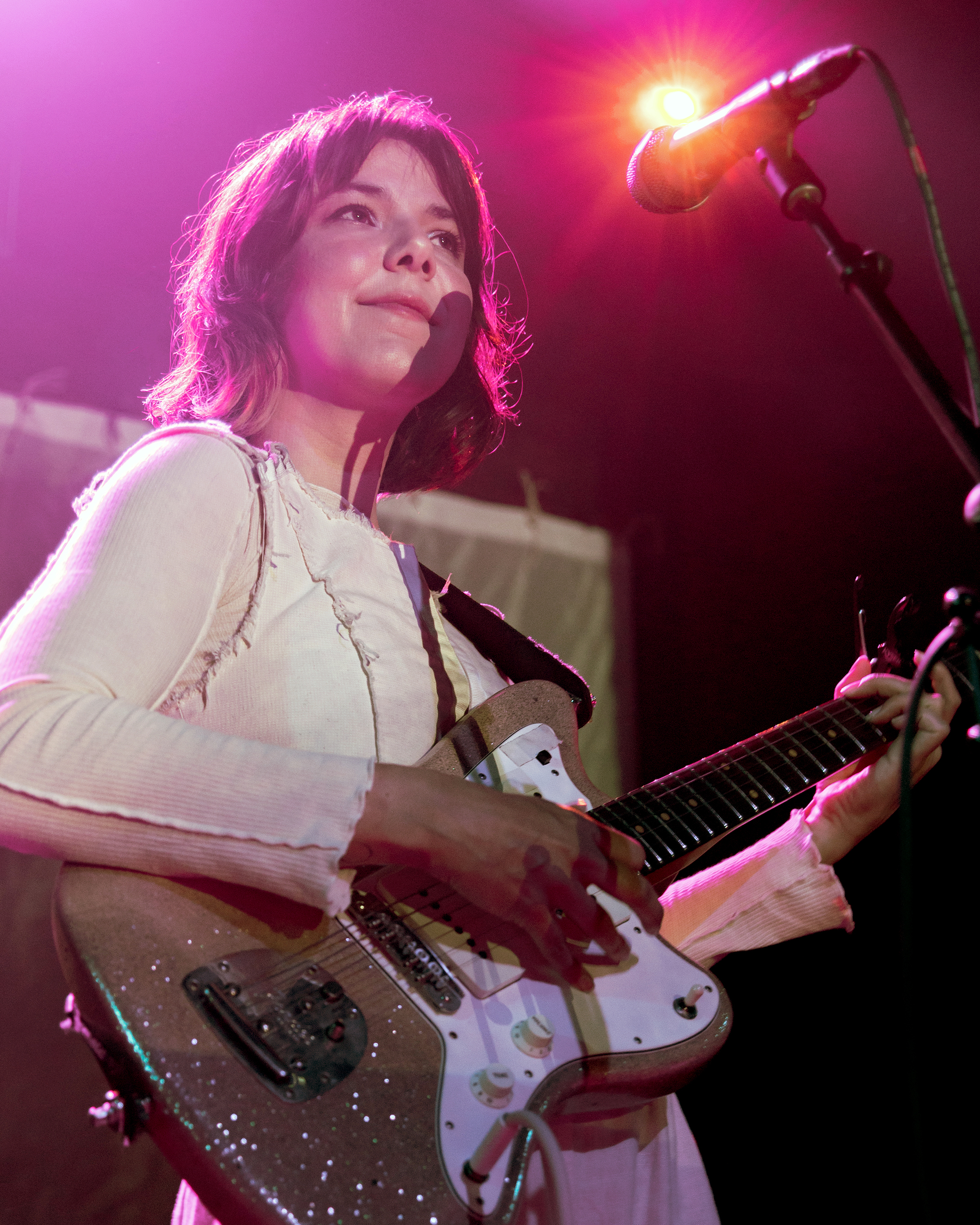
- Nanna performing in 2023

Background information
- Also known as: Songbird
- Born: 6 May 1989 (age 37); Garður, Iceland
- Genres: Indie pop; indie rock; indie folk; folk rock; acoustic
- Occupations: Singer; songwriter; musician
- Instruments: Vocals; guitar; piano
- Years active: 2010–present
- Member of: Of Monsters and Men

Nanna Bryndís Hilmarsdóttir (born 6 May 1989) is an Icelandic musician. She originally performed solo, under the name Songbird. She is the co-lead vocalist and guitarist of the Icelandic indie folk band Of Monsters and Men. In 2023, she released her debut solo album, titled How to Start a Garden.

== Biography ==
Nanna was raised in Garður, a town in southwestern Iceland. She attended music school as a child and prior to the formation of the group Of Monsters and Men, she had a solo musical project called Songbird. She wrote and performed music on open mic nights around Reykjavík and was a video store clerk.

=== Of Monsters and Men ===
Following her Songbird phase, Nanna recruited five musicians who eventually became Of Monsters and Men in 2010. After a week of working together, they won the annual music competition Músíktilraunir.

They released their debut studio album, My Head Is an Animal, in late 2011. It charted in multiple regions, and the band gained popularity worldwide. After the Seattle radio station KEXP broadcast a performance from bandmate Ragnar Þórhallsson's living room, the band went viral.

=== Solo work ===
On 13 January 2023, she released the single "Godzilla" under the name Nanna, followed by a second single, "Crybaby", on 22 February, and the announcement of a solo album entitled How to Start a Garden, which came out on 5 May 2023. On 5 April, she issued a third single, "Disaster Master". Nanna wrote most of How to Start a Garden in a cabin outside Reykjavík. About the project, Riff Magazine stated, "she captures a magnificent soundscape—rich, warm and subtle—that feels solemn and full."

In July 2023, Nanna performed at the Newport Folk Festival, a performance that according to Rhode Island Magazine "offered a more slowed-take on the dreamy Icelandic vibe."

== Influences ==
Nanna cites some of her favorite musicians/influences as Gayngs, Lianne La Havas, Arcade Fire, Feist, and Justin Vernon, of the alt-folk band Bon Iver.

== Discography ==
=== with Of Monsters and Men ===
- My Head Is an Animal (2011)
- Beneath the Skin (2015)
- Fever Dream (2019)
- All is Love and Pain in the Mouse Parade (2025)

=== Solo ===
- How to Start a Garden (2023)
