= Ragnar Þórhallsson =

Icelandic musician (born 1987)

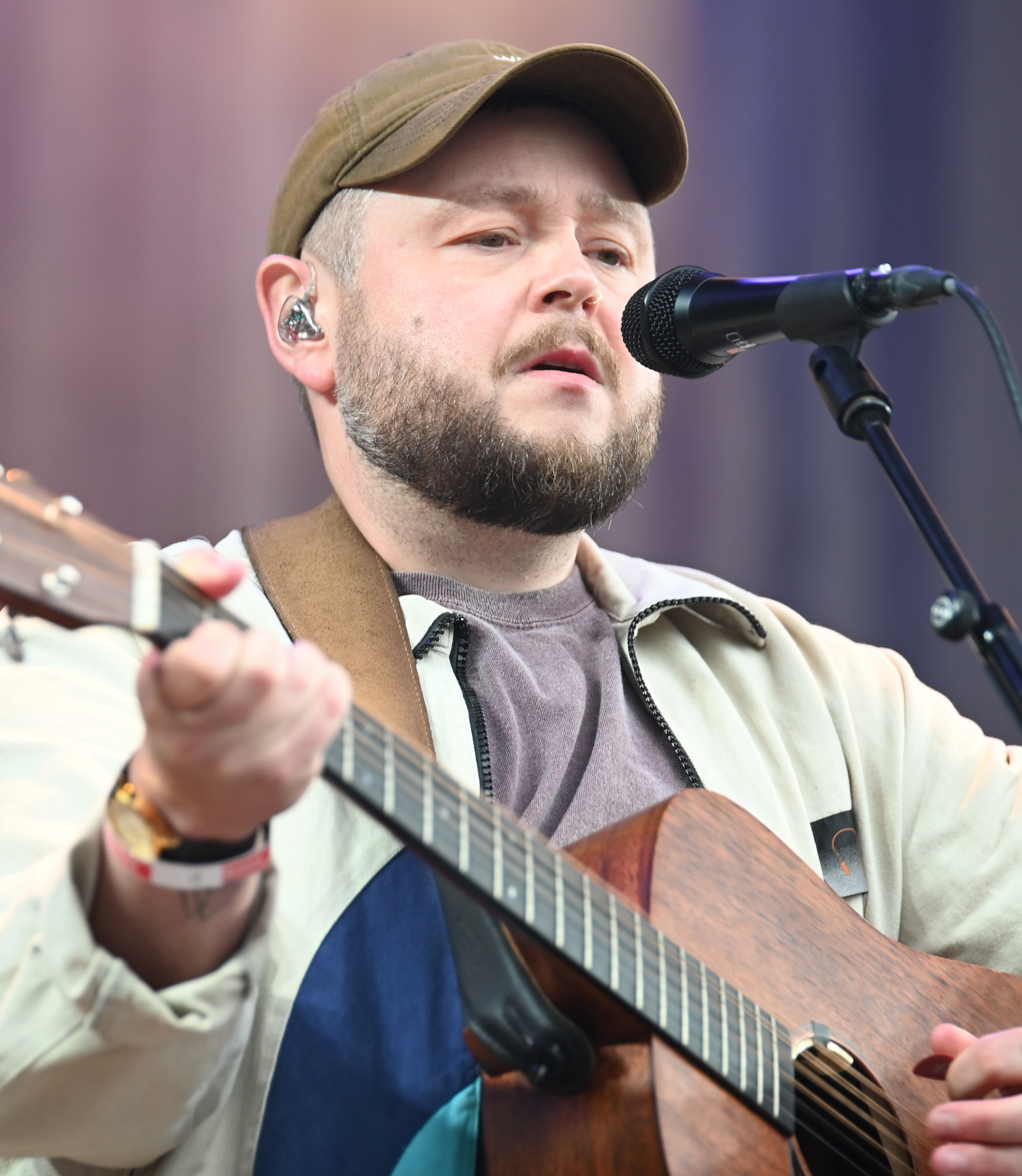
- Ragnar in 2026

Background information
- Born: 6 March 1987 (age 39); Garðabær, Iceland
- Genres: Indie pop; indie rock; indie folk; folk rock; acoustic
- Occupations: Singer; songwriter; musician
- Instruments: Vocals; guitar; melodica; glockenspiel
- Years active: 2009–present
- Member of: Of Monsters and Men

Ragnar "Raggi" Þórhallsson (born 6 March 1987) is an Icelandic musician. He is the co-lead vocalist and guitarist, along with Nanna Bryndís Hilmarsdóttir, of the Icelandic indie folk band Of Monsters and Men.

== Early life ==
Ragnar Þórhallsson was born on 6 March 1987 in Garðabær, Iceland. He attended Fjölbrautaskólinn í Garðabæ, a secondary school located in Garðabær.

He received his first guitar at the age of nine, but did not begin to seriously play the instrument until around the age of seventeen due to initially focusing on visual art and painting rather than on music. His early reluctance to perform was also due to strong stage-fright: when he did first perform, he recalled standing at the back of the stage, his face “a fiery shade of red.”

== Of Monsters and Men ==
Ragnar joined the band in 2010, and later that year the band won the annual Icelandic music competition Músíktilraunir.

Ragnar also came up with the band name, Of Monsters and Men.
