= List of best-selling albums by country =

The following is an independently-determined list of best-selling albums by country. Depends on the measurement, record sales of albums are taken by estimations or certifications.

Note that some of the data are incomplete due to a lack of available published data from a number of territories, unlike the United Kingdom and the United States with recognized national measurement firms and certifying bodies such as Official Charts Company/British Phonographic Industry (BPI) and Nielsen SoundScan/Recording Industry Association of America (RIAA) respectively. Therefore, no rankings are given in certain cases.

== Bangladesh ==
Year	Artist	Album	Sales	Origin
2001	Asif Akbar	O Priya Tumi Kothay	6,000,000	Claimed sales
1993	Miles	Prottasha	300,000	Claimed sales
2003	Habib Wahid	Krishno	300,000	Claimed sales
2006	Stoic Bliss	Light Years Ahead	250,000	Claimed sales

== Bolivia ==
Year	Artist	Album	Sales	Origin
1983	Los Kjarkas	Canto a la Mujer Bolivia de mi Pueblo	75,000	Claimed sales
1997	Luis Miguel	Romances	20,000	Claimed sales
1964	Spanish Singing Nuns	Cantan Las Dominicas	20,000	Claimed sales
1990	Juan Gabriel	Juan Gabriel en el Palacio de Bellas Artes	12,000	Claimed sales
1996	Lapsus (band)	Umar Mash	10,000	Claimed sales
1999	Azul Azul	El Sapo	10,000	Claimed sales
	Willy Claure	Cuecas para no bailar	10,000	Claimed sales
1989	Los Cambistas	Nuevo Rumbo	8,000	Claimed sales
	Los Cambistas	El Negocito	8,000	Claimed sales
1998	Octavia	Ciclos	5,000	Claimed sales
2004	Deszaire	Sexo Seguro	5,000	Claimed sales

== Bulgaria ==
Year	Artist	Album	Sales	Origin
1994	Gumeni Glavi	Debut album	100,000	Claimed sales
2004	Azis	Together- Заедно с Деси Слава	68,000	Claimed sales

== Cameroon ==
Year	Artist	Album	Sales	Origin
1989	Grace Decca	Besoin d'amour	150,000	Claimed sales
1996	Petit-Pays	Class F/M	50,000	Claimed sales
1995	Henri Dikongué	Wa	20,000	Claimed sales

== Croatia ==
Year	Artist	Album	Sales	Origin
2006	Thompson	Bilo jednom u Hrvatskoj	120,000	Claimed sales
1997	Petar Grašo	Mjesec iznad oblaka	110,000	Claimed sales
2007	Various	The Ultimate Collection	100,000	Claimed sales
2001	Gibonni	Mirakul	70,000	Claimed sales
1991	Tomislav Ivčić	Stop the War in Croatia (STWIC)	64,600	Claimed sales
2007	Toše Proeski	Igri bez granici	60,000	Claimed sales
1994	Electro Team	Second to None	51,500	Claimed sales
2006	Gibonni	Unca Fibre	45,000	Claimed sales
2010	Gibonni	Toleranca	30,000	Claimed sales

== Czech Republic ==
1994 to 2006
Rank	Year	Title	Artist
1	1996	Šmoulí-super-disko-šou	various
2	2001	Rebelové OST	various
3	1998	Cik-Cak	Lunetic
4	1993	Snídaně v trávě	Michal Tučný
5	1996	Pasáček hvězd	František a Jan Nedvědovi

Year	Artist	Album	Claimed Sales	Origin
1998	Lunetic	Cik Cak	235,000	Claimed sales
1997	Various	Dracula (Czech musical)	225,000	Claimed sales
1997	Andrea Bocelli	Romanza	182,000	Claimed sales
1997	Karel Gott & Lucie Bílá	Duety	165,000	Claimed sales
1994	Shalom	Brány vzkazů	150,000	Claimed sales
1997	Daniel Hulka	Daniel Hulka	150,000	Claimed sales
2001	Various	Rebelové OST	134,000	Claimed sales
1997	The Smurfs music	Prvni Zimni Smoulympiada	130,000	Claimed sales
1999	Jan Nedvěd	Honza	106,000	Claimed sales
1994	Lucie	Černý kočky mokrý žáby	100,000	Claimed sales
1998	Lucie Bílá	Hvězdy jako hvězdy	100,000	Claimed sales

== Denmark ==
Year	Artist	Album	Sales	Origin
1983	Kim Larsen	Midt om natten	650,000	Claimed sales (up to 2018)
1986	Kim Larsen	Disguised as an adult	650,000	Claimed sales (up to 1988)
1982	Michael Jackson	Thriller	580,000^{‡}	IFPI Danmark certification (original release) & Reissue
1992	ABBA	ABBA Gold	560,000	IFPI Danmark certification (2011)
1986	Kim Larsen	Forklædt som voksen	500,000	Claimed sales (up to 2010)
1990	Shu-bi-dua	Shu-bi-dua 4	500,000	Claimed sales (up to 2016)
1988	Kim Larsen	Yummi Yummi	450,000	Claimed sales (up to 1988)
1997	Aqua	Aquarium	430,000	Claimed sales (up to 2001)
1989	Sanne Salomonsen	Sanne	400,000	Claimed sales (up to 2007)
2011	Rasmus Seebach	Mer' end kærlighed	380,000^{‡}	IFPI Danmark certification (2026)
2013	Rasmus Seebach	Ingen kan love dig i morgen	360,000^{‡}	IFPI Danmark certification (2026)
2015	Kim Larsen	Guld & Grønne Skove	340,000^{‡}	IFPI Danmark certification (2025)
1976	ABBA	Arrival	330,000	Claimed sales
2009	Rasmus Seebach	Rasmus Seebach	320,000^{‡}	IFPI Danmark certification (2026)
1989	Kim Larsen	Kielgasten	301,000	Claimed sales (up to 2007)
2015	Kim Larsen	Guld & grønne skove	300,000^{‡}	IFPI Danmark certification (2022)
1979	Shu-bi-dua	Shu-bi-dua 6	300,000	Claimed sales (up to 1979)
2015	Lukas Graham	Lukas Graham	300,000^{‡}	IFPI Danmark certification (2024)
1990	Hanne Boel	Dark Passion	280,000	Claimed sales (up to 1991)

== Dominican Republic ==
Year	Artist	Album	Sales	Origin
2000	Toño Rosario	Yo Soy Toño	62,000	Claimed sales
1982	Fernando Villalona	El Mayimbe	60,000	Claimed sales
2008	Milly Quezada	Sólo Faltas Tú	50,000	Claimed sales
2007	Los Hermanos Rosario	Aura	30,000	Claimed sales
2007	Juan Luis Guerra	La Llave de mi Corazon	10,000	Claimed sales
2009	Bocatabu	Historia Virgenes	8,000	Claimed sales
2004	Rubby Perez	Tonto Corazón	7,500	Claimed sales
2005	Panky y Los Manolos	Variado	6,000	Claimed sales
2004	Juan Luis Guerra	Para Ti	4,192	Claimed Sales
2009	Johnny Ventura	Volvio La Navidad	4,000	Claimed sales

- Additional information: A best-selling album could have sales between 4,000 and 10,000 copies, according to some reports in the 1990s to early 2010s.

== Ecuador ==
Year	Artist	Album	Sales	Origin
2010	Juan Fernando Velasco	Con todo el alma	250,000; 70,000	Claimed sales
2012	Fausto Miño	Solitario corazón	52,000	Claimed sales
2007	Belanova	Fantasía Pop	50,000	Claimed sales
2015	Juan Fernando Velasco	Misquilla	50,000	Claimed sales
	Enrique Vargas Mármol "Aladino"	Volumen 1	25,000	Claimed sales
2004	Cruks en Karnak	13 Gracias	25,000	Claimed sales
2003	Cruks en Karnak	Las desventuras de Cruks en Karnak	22,000	Claimed sales
2003	Kiruba	Kiruba	20,000	Claimed sales

== Estonia ==
Year	Artist	Album	Sales	Origin
2001	Francis Goya	Pleased to meet You, Mr.Valgre	20,000	Claimed sales
2010	Metsatöll	Äio	13,000	Claimed sales
2004	Metsatöll	Hiiekoda	10,000	Claimed sales
2011	Laur Teär	Lootuste Linnutee	8,500	Claimed sales
2011	Metsatöll	Ulg	7,000	Claimed sales
1997	Metallica	Reload	5,000	Claimed sales

== Ghana ==
Year	Artist	Album	Sales	Origin
1963	Nana Kwame Ampadu	Nana Kwame Ampadu	100,000	Claimed sales
1998	Reggie Rockstone	Me Na Me Kae	100,000	Claimed sales
1992	Kenny G	Breathless	80,000	Claimed sales
1997	Reggie Rockstone	Makaa Maka	50,000	Claimed sales
1996	Lucky Dube	Serious Business	25,000	Claimed sales

- Additional information: According to a 2003 report from The Society, gospel music in Ghana constituted the largest commercial genre by that time; and 5,000 copies sold of a record were technically a "hit" in the country. A 2005 article of Daily Graphic, puts the highest amount that a musician can peak to be 50,000 copies.

== Greece ==
Rank	Year	Artist	Album	Sales	Origin
1	1969	Giannis Poulopoulos	O Dromos	1,000,000	Claimed Sales
2	1979	Thanos Mikroutsikos	O Stavros Tou Notou	700,000	Certifications
3	1982	Yiannis Parios	Ta Nisiotika	400,000	Certifications
4	1982	Giorgos Dalaras	Ta Tragoudia Mou (Orfeas)	350,000	Certifications
5	1983	Glykeria	Me Ti Glykeria Stin Omorfi Nyhta	350,000	Certifications
6	1983	Ta Paidia Ap' Ti Patra	Afieromeno Exairetika	350,000	Certifications
7	1987	Giorgos Dalaras	Latin	300,000	Certifications
8	1975	Syllogi	14 Original Syrtaki	300,000	Certifications
9	1976	Socrates Drank the Conium	Phos	300,000	Certifications
10	1975	Giorgos Dalaras	50 Chronia Rembetiko Tragoudi	250,000	Certifications
11	1964	Mikis Theodorakis	To Axion Esti	250,000	Certifications
12	1983	Dionysis Savvopoulos	Trapezakia Exo	250,000	Certifications
13	1976	Yiannis Parios	Tora Pia	240,000	Certifications
14	2001	Despina Vandi	Geia	200,000	Certifications
15	1985	Glykeria	Tragoudi Aisthimatiko	200,000	Certifications
16	1996	Notis Sfakianakis	5o Vima	200,000	Certifications
17	1984	Nikos Papazoglou	Haratsi	200,000	Certifications
18	1978	Nikos Papazoglou	I Ekdhikisi Tis Gyftias	200,000	Certifications
19	1977	Olympians	I Megales Epitychies Ton Olympians	200,000	Certifications
20	1975	Dionysis Savvopoulos	10 Chronia Kommatia	200,000	Certifications
21	1982	Dionysis Savvopoulos	Fortigo	200,000	Certifications
22	1980	Sotiria Bellou	Laika Proastia	200,000	Certifications
23	1965	Manos Hatzidakis	Pote Tin Kyriaki	200,000	Certifications
24	1971	Poll	Anthropos	200,000	Certifications
25	1972	Manos Hatzidakis	O Megalos Erotikos	200,000	Certifications
26	1975	Dionysis Savvopoulos	To Vromiko Psomi	200,000	Certifications
27	1972	Giorgos Koinousis	Koinousis 13	200,000	Certifications
28	1977	Syllogi	Welcome to Greece 8, 14 Instrumental Syrtaki	200,000	Certifications
29	1985	Mimis Plessas	Tragoudia Apo Ton Elliniko Kinimatografo	200,000	Certifications
30	1999	Notis Sfakianakis	XXX Enthymion	180,000	Certifications
31	1985	Ta Paidia Ap' Ti Patra	Karavan	180,000	Certifications
32	1989	Yiannis Parios	San Trelo Fortigo	180,000	Certifications
33	1989	Giorgos Dalaras	Mi Milas Kindyneuei I Ellas	180,000	Certifications
34	1996	Katy Garbi	Archizo Polemo	180,000	Certifications
35	2000	Anna Vissi	Kravgi	175,000	Certifications
36	1997	Anna Vissi	Trauma	170,000	Certifications
37	1992	Dimitris Mitropanos	I Ethniki Mas Monaxia	160,000	Certifications
38	2001	Giannis Ploutarhos	Mikres Photographies	150,000	Certifications
39	2002	Antonis Remos	Kardia Mou Min Anisichis	150,000	Certifications
40	1988	Stratos Dionysiou	Ego O Xenos	150,000	Certifications

- All sales figures are based on certifications as detailed in Ελληνικἠ Δισκογραφἰα 1950 - 2023, Πἐτρος Δραγουμἀνος (Greek Discography 1950–2023 by Petros Dragoumanos) except as otherwise noted.
- IFPI Greece counts each disc within a double album as a single unit for the purposes of gold and platinum awards, treating double albums as two separate units for certification calculations. To accurately report sales figures per album unit, this chart adjusts certifications for double albums to total units sold by dividing the certification amount by the number of discs (2) in the LP.
- Total streams per album are used as tiebreaker for albums with same certification levels

== Haiti ==
Year	Artist	Title	Sales	Origin
c. 1979	DP Express	David	8,000	Claimed sales

- Additional information: Legitimate album sales higher estimates are considered to be between 5,000 and even a "maximum" of 10,000 of a record.

== Hungary ==
Year	Artist	Album	Sales	Origin
	Various artists	Csendes éj	768,000	Claimed sales
1972	István Horváth	Hopp te Zsiga!	631,000	Claimed sales
	Záray-Vámosi	I	572,000	Claimed sales
1979	Katalin Karády	Katalin Karády	479,000	Claimed sales
	Various artists	István, a király	447,000	Claimed sales
1976	Pál Szécsi	Violák	434,000	Claimed sales
1984	Dolly Roll	Eldorádoll	374,000	Claimed sales
1986	Neoton Família	Minek ez a cirkusz?	374,000	Claimed sales
1984	100 Folk Celsius	Paff, a bűvös sárkány	309,000	Claimed sales
1996	The Smurfs music	Hupikék Törpikék* – Buli Van Aprajafalván!	290,000	Claimed sales
1993	Rapülők	Rapülők	170,000.	Claimed sales

== Iceland ==
Year	Artist	Album	Sales	Origin
1967	Leikhópurinn Dýrin í Hálsaskógi	Dýrin í Hálsaskógi	50,000	Claimed sales
2012	Hafdís Huld	Vögguvísur	50,000	Claimed sales
2012	Ásgeir Trausti	Dýrð í dauðaþögn	40,000	Claimed sales
2011	Mugison	Haglél	32,000	Claimed sales
2011	Of Monsters and Men	My Head Is an Animal	27,000	Claimed sales
1977	Meat Loaf	Bat Out of Hell	20,000	Claimed sales
1977	Stainer Gunnar Thordarson & Björgvin Halldórsson	Ut Uma Graena Grundu	20,000	Claimed sales
1993	Björk	Debut	20,000	Claimed sales
1999	Sigur Rós	Ágætis byrjun	19,500	Claimed sales
2005	Óskar Pétursson	Þú átt mig ein	15,000	Claimed sales
2005	Garðars Thors Cortes	Cortes	15,000	Claimed sales
1993	Bubbi Morthens	Lífið er ljúft	13,000	Claimed sales
2002	Björgvin Halldórsson	Ár og öld	12,000	Claimed sales
1997	Sigur Rós	Von	10,500	Claimed sales
2005	Helgi Björns	Yfir Esjuna	10,000	Claimed sales
2005	Sigur Rós	Takk...	10,000	Claimed sales
2020	Bríet	Kveðja, Bríet	10,000	Claimed sales

== India ==
Year	Album	Artist(s)	Sales	Origin
1995	Dilwale Dulhania Le Jayenge	Jatin–Lalit	25,000,000	Claimed sales
1990	Aashiqui	Nadeem–Shravan	20,000,000	Claimed sales
1995	Bolo Ta Ra Ra..	Daler Mehndi	20,000,000	Claimed sales
1995	Bombay	A. R. Rahman	15,000,000	Claimed sales
1997	Dil To Pagal Hai	Uttam Singh	12,500,000	Claimed sales
1994	Hum Aapke Hain Kaun	Raamlaxman	12,000,000	Claimed sales
1996	Raja Hindustani	Nadeem–Shravan	11,000,000	Claimed sales
1989	Maine Pyar Kiya	Raamlaxman	10,000,000	Claimed sales
1991	Saajan	Nadeem–Shravan	10,000,000	Claimed sales
1995	Bewafa Sanam	Nikhil–Vinay	10,000,000	Claimed sales
1995	Rangeela	A. R. Rahman	10,000,000	Claimed sales
1999	Kaho Naa...Pyaar Hai	Rajesh Roshan	10,000,000	Claimed sales
1998	Kuch Kuch Hota Hai	Jatin–Lalit	8,000,000	Claimed sales
1997	Pardes	Nadeem–Shravan	6,000,000	Claimed sales
1991	Phool Aur Kaante	Nadeem–Shravan	6,000,000	Claimed sales

== Ireland ==
Irish Recorded Music Association's best selling albums
Rank	Year	Album	Artist
1	1998	White Ladder	David Gray
2	1992	Gold: The Greatest Hits	ABBA
3	1992	A Woman's Heart	Various
4	1998	The Best of 1980–1990	U2
5	1994	Live at the Point	Christy Moore

Irish Recorded Music Association certifications / sales
Rank	Year	Album	Artist	Sales	Certification
1	1992	A Woman's Heart	Various	750,000	-
2	1999	White Ladder	David Gray	350,000	20× Platinum
3	1997	Talk on Corners	The Corrs	300,000	20× Platinum
4	2011	21	Adele	270,000	18× Platinum
5	1992	Live at the Point	Christy Moore	270,000	-
6	2009	Crazy Love	Michael Bublé	225,000	15× Platinum
7	1975	Greatest Hits	ABBA	200,000	-
7	1996	Faith of Our Fathers	Frank Patterson...	200,000	-
8	1995	Forgiven, Not Forgotten	The Corrs	195,000	13× Platinum
9	1976	Arrival	ABBA	150,000	-
9	1994	What Colour Is the Wind	Charlie Landsborough	150,000	-
9	1995	Robson & Jerome	Robson & Jerome	150,000	-
9	1998	Urban Hymns	the Verve	150,000	10× Platinum
9	2008	The Love Album	Westlife	150,000	10× Platinum
10	1998	Tracy Chapman	Tracy Chapman	145,000	9× Platinum
11	1996	Spice	Spice Girls	135,000	9× Platinum
11	2008	The Fame / The Fame Monster	Lady Gaga	135,000	9× Platinum
12	1992	Unplugged	Eric Clapton	120,000	8× Platinum
12	1999	Unplugged	The Corrs	120,000	8× Platinum
12	2005	X&Y	Coldplay	120,000	8× Platinum
12	2005	Face to Face	Westlife	120,000	8× Platinum
12	2008	The Circus	Take That	120,000	8× Platinum
12	2009	I Dreamed a Dream	Susan Boyle	120,000	8× Platinum

== Israel ==
Year	Artist	Album	Sales	Origin
1980	Zohar Argov	Eleanor	500,000	Claimed sales
1997	Eyal Golan	Without You	350,000	Claimed sales
1998	Eyal Golan	Soldier Of Love	300,000	Claimed sales
1983	Haim Moshe	Ahavat Hayay	200,000	Claimed sales
1987	David Broza	Haisha She'iti	165,000	Claimed sales
1973	Kaveret	Poogy Tales	150,000	Claimed sales
1997	Emma Shapplin	Carmine Meo	120,000	Claimed sales
1984	David Broza	The Woman by My Side	120,000	Claimed sales
1986	Rita	#1	110,000	Claimed sales
1992	Shlomo Artzi	Yareach	105,000	Claimed sales
1999	Sarit Hadad	Like Cinderella	100,000	Claimed sales
	Rami Kleinstein	tapuchim v'tmarim	100,000	Claimed sales
1987	Rita	#2	100,000	Claimed sales
1987	Rita	#3	90,000	Claimed sales
1988	Yehuda Poliker	Efer v'avak	90,000	Claimed sales
1988	Shlomo Artzi	Hom Yuli August	85,000	Claimed sales
1988	Mashina	Ladies and Gentelemen, Mashina	80,000	Claimed sales
1982	Michael Jackson	Thriller	80,000	Claimed sales
1987	Yehudit Ravitz	Comes From Love	80,000	Claimed sales
2002	Zehava Ben	Melech Amiti	80,000	Claimed sales
1989	Hava Alberstein	London	70,000	Claimed sales
1995	Madonna	Something to Remember	70,000	Claimed sales
1984	Mashina	The First	70,000	Claimed sales
1985	Shalom Hanoch	Waiting For The Messiah	70,000	Claimed sales
1986	Madonna	True Blue	62,000	Claimed sales
	Ariel Zilber	Shmulik's Fans	60,000	Claimed sales
1999	Ethnix	Welcome to Israel	60,000	Claimed sales
	Tislam	Strong Radio	60,000	Claimed sales
1998	Madonna	Ray of Light	55,000	Claimed sales
1990	Madonna	The Immaculate Collection	50,000	Claimed sales
1987	Gidi Gov	Drech Erez	50,000	Claimed sales
	Kaveret	Tzfuf B'Ozen	50,000	Claimed sales
	Arik Einstein & Shalom Hanoch	Shavlul	50,000	Claimed sales
	Svika Pick	Music	50,000	Claimed sales

== Ivory Coast ==
Year	Artist	Album	Sales	Origin
1990	Serge Kassi	I'm Proud	100,000	Claimed sales
1991	Les Parents du Campus	Gboglo koffi	90,000	Claimed sales
2000	Soum Bill	Zambakro	80,000	Claimed sales
1998	Alpha Blondy	Yitzhak Rabin	75,000	Claimed sales
1996	Alpha Blondy	Grand Bassam Zion Rock	65,000	Claimed sales
2007	Billy Billy	Nouvelles du pays	25,000	Claimed sales
1993	UB40	Promises and Lies	22,000	Claimed sales
2009	Billy Billy	Réunion 2 Famille	15,000	Claimed sales

== Jamaica ==
Year	Artist	Album	Sales	Origin
1970	Nicky Thomas	Have a Little Faith	50,000	Claimed sales
1989	Lloyd Lovindeer	Gilbert Yu Gone	30,000	Claimed sales

== Latvia ==
Year	Artist	Album	Sales	Origin
2001	Prāta Vētra	Kaķēns, kurš atteicās no jūrasskolas	27,000	Claimed sales
1999	Prāta Vētra	Among the Suns	25,000	Claimed sales
2006	Prāta Vētra	Four Shores	25,000	Claimed sales
2008	Prāta Vētra	Tur kaut kam ir jābūt	20,000	Claimed sales
2000	Marijas Naumovas and Nika Matvejeva	Ieskaties acīs	15,000	Certification
2023	Ričijs Rū (Richie Roo)	Ričijs Rū rīko koncertu	10,000	Certification
2008	Andris Ērglis	Sirdspuksti	10,000	Certification

== Malaysia ==
Sales figure derived from various sources.

Year	Title	Artist	Claimed sales	Certifications	Ref.
1996	Puji-Pujian	Raihan	1,000,000 – 1,500,000	> 66 × Platinum	
1994	USA	Ella	500,000 – 900,000	> 33 × Platinum	
1994	Bisa Berbisa	Ukays	500,000 – 900,000	> 33 × Platinum	
1996	Dang Dang Dut	Amelina, Iwan & Sheeda	500,000 – 900,000	> 33 × Platinum	
1997	Siti Nurhaliza	Siti Nurhaliza	500,000 – 900,000	> 33 × Platinum	
1996	Kau Kunci Cintaku (Dalam Hatimu)	Ramlah Ram	500,000 – 800,000	> 33 × Platinum	
1992	30110	Ella	500,000 – 800,000	> 33 × Platinum	
1997	Brutal	XPDC	500,000 – 800,000	> 33 × Platinum	
1993	The Goodbye Kiss	Jacky Cheung	500,000 – 800,000	> 33 × Platinum	
1995	Kesan Terbukti	Kumpulan Slam	400,000 – 800,000	> 26 × Platinum	
1997	Cindai	Siti Nurhaliza	400,000 – 800,000	> 26 × Platinum	
1998	Adiwarna	Siti Nurhaliza	400,000 – 800,000	> 26 × Platinum	
1996	Paint My Love - Greatest Hits	Michael Learns to Rock	375,000	15 × Platinum	
1995	Tajam Menikam	Ukays	300,000 – 600,000	> 20 × Platinum	
1999	The Best of Awie	Awie	300,000 – 600,000	> 20 × Platinum	
1996	Kembali Merindu	Kumpulan Slam	300,000 – 600,000	> 20 × Platinum	
1996	Terbaik Slam	Kumpulan Slam	300,000 – 600,000	> 20 × Platinum	
2009	Thank You Allah	Maher Zain	300,000 – 500,000	> 20 × Platinum	
1989	Fenomena	Search	300,000 – 500,000	> 20 × Platinum	
1999	E.M.A.S	Siti Nurhaliza	250,000 – 400,000	> 16 × Platinum	
1990	Karisma	Search	250,000 – 400,000	> 16 × Platinum	

== Malta ==
Year	Artist	Album	Sales	Origin
1975	ABBA	Greatest Hits	3,000	Claimed sales
2003	Etnika	Żifna	3,000	Claimed sales
2006	Toby	Digi Kinda Life	3,000	Claimed sales
2004	Joseph Calleja	Tenor Arias	3,000	Claimed sales
2005	Joseph Calleja	The Golden Voice	1,500	Claimed sales

== Malawi ==
Year	Artist	Album	Sales	Origin
2004	McDonald Mlaka Maliro	Musalire	60,000	Claimed sales
2012	Thocco Katimba	Ndidzaimabe	53,000	Claimed sales
2014	The Great Angels Choir	Mwasankha ine	40,000	Claimed sales
2010	Thocco Katimba	Werenga Madalitso Ako	25,400	Claimed sales
2005	Collins Bandawe	Tchekela Maluzi	20,000	Claimed sales
2011	Lucius Banda	Life	10,000	Claimed sales

== Morocco ==
Year	Artist	Album	Sales	Origin
1994	Douzi	Goulou Imumti Tjini	70,000	Claimed sales

== Nigeria ==
Year	Artist	Album	Sales	Origin
1984	King Sunny Adé	Ase	200,000	Claimed sales
1988	Majek Fashek	Prisoner of Conscience	200,000	Claimed sales
1977	Sonny Okosun	Papa's Land	150,000	Claimed sales
1978	Sonny Okosun	Fire in Soweto	150,000	Claimed sales
1978	Sonny Okosun	Holy Wars	150,000	Claimed sales
1977	Christy Essien-Igbokwe	Freedom	100,000	Claimed sales
1978	Christy Essien-Igbokwe	Patience	100,000	Claimed sales
1978	Christy Essien-Igbokwe	Time Waits For No One	100,000	Claimed sales
1979	Christy Essien-Igbokwe	One Understanding	100,000	Claimed sales
1981	King Sunny Adé	The Message	100,000	Claimed sales

== Pakistan ==
Rank	Year	Album	Artist(s)	Sales	Ref
1	1995	Billo De Ghar	Abrar-ul-Haq	16,000,000	
2	1987	Hawa Hawa	Hassan Jahangir	15,000,000	
3	1981	Disco Deewane	Nazia Hassan and Zoheb Hassan	14,000,000	
4	1997	Only One	Nusrat Fateh Ali Khan and Mahmood Khan	6,000,000	
5	2003	Huqa Pani	Ali Zafar	5,000,000	
5	2004	Jal Pari	Atif Aslam	5,000,000	
7	1997	Vande Mataram	A. R. Rahman and Nusrat Fateh Ali Khan	2,000,000	
7	2006	Doorie	Atif Aslam	2,000,000	
9	1989	Vital Signs 1	Vital Signs	1,000,000	
9	1996	Sangam	Nusrat Fateh Ali Khan and Javed Akhtar	1,000,000	
9	1997	Azadi	Junoon	1,000,000	
9	1998	Roshni	Hadiqa Kiani	1,000,000	

== Papua New Guinea ==
Up to 2006, George Telek's albums distributed by CHM sold about 15,000 copies each. The band Painim Wok, which had Telek as a member, became one of the best-selling bands in Papua New Guinea (or the best-selling band) with over 100,000 copies of their albums in 5 years alone up to 1993.

== Peru ==
Year	Artist	Album	Sales	Origin
2000	Dina Páucar	Cobarde	120,000	Claimed sales
1996	Pedro Suárez-Vértiz	Póntelo en la lengua	100,000	Claimed sales
2018	Gian Marco	Intuición	100,000	Claimed sales
1991	Luis Miguel	Romance	60,000	Certified sales
1985	Hombres G	Hombres G	50,000	Claimed sales
2011	Gian Marco	Días Nuevos	50,000	Claimed sales
2003	Libído	Pop*Porn	50,000	Claimed sales
1994	Luis Miguel	Segundo Romance	40,000	Certified sales
2009	John Kelvin	Renacer	40,000	Claimed sales
2004	Nosequien y Los Nosecuantos	Pisco sour	35,000	Claimed sales
1997	Alejandro Sanz	Más	30,000	Certified sales
2008	Gian Marco	Desde Adentro	30,000	Claimed sales
2011	Pedro Suárez-Vértiz	Ponerme a volar	30,000	Claimed sales

== Poland ==
Year	Artist	Album	Sales	Origin
1995	Varius Manx	Elf	1,250,000	Claimed sales
1997	Budka Suflera	Nic nie boli, tak jak życie	1,100,000	Claimed sales
1977	ABBA	ABBA: The Album	1,000,000	Claimed sales
1993	Hey	Fire	1,000,000	Claimed sales
1999	Spooko	Spooko, panie Wiśniewski	1,000,000	Claimed sales
1976	ABBA	Arrival	800,000	Claimed sales
1993	Hey	Ho!	750,000	Claimed sales
2001	Ich Troje	Ad.4	700,000	Claimed sales
1999	Kayah / Goran Bregović	Kayah i Bregović	700,000	Claimed sales
1997	James Horner	Titanic: Music from the Motion Picture	700,000	Certifications
1995	Edyta Górniak	Dotyk	500,000	Claimed sales
1963	Mazowsze	Mazowsze Sings Christmas Carols	464,199	Claimed sales
1995	Liroy	Alboom	400,000	Claimed sales
1985	Maciej Zembaty	Alleluja	400,000	Claimed sales
1994	Varius Manx	Emu	400,000	Certifications
1994	Various artists	Smerfne Hity 1	400,000	Certifications
1966	Stanisław Grzesiuk	Nie masz cwaniaka nad Warszawiaka	390,990	Claimed sales
1969	Piotr Szczepanik	Empty Envelopes	390,990	Claimed sales
1970	Christie	Christie	375,497	Claimed sales
1961	H. Kowalewska & M. Koleśnik	Głęboka studzienka	375,497	Claimed sales
1968	Filipinki	Do widzenia, profesorze	353,240	Claimed sales
1967	Filipinki	Wala twist	351,500	Claimed sales
1980	Goombay Dance Band	Sun of Jamaica	327,000	Claimed sales
1967	Jarema Stępowski	Szemrane Tango	319,370	Claimed sales
1968	Violetta Villas	Przyjdzie na to czas	318,530	Claimed sales
1970	Katarzyna Sobczyk	O mnie się nie martw	315,805	Claimed sales
1970	Orkiestra z ulicy Chmielnej	Zakazane piosenki	305,165	Claimed sales

== Russia ==
Year	Artist	Album	Sales	Origin
1997	Various artists	Soyuz-21	5,000,000	Claimed sales
1997	Golden Ring	Go Away to grief	2,000,000	Claimed sales
	Laima Vaikule	Laima Vaikule	1,800,000	Claimed sales
1994	Ivanushki International	Your Letters	1,500,000	Claimed sales
2002	Lyube	Давай за...	1,500,000	Claimed sales
1996	Linda	Vorona	1,500,000	Claimed sales
2000	Zemfira	Forgive Me My Love	1,500,000	Claimed sales
2003	Глюк’oza	Глюк’oza Nostra	1,400,000	Claimed sales
2001	Руки Вверх!	Не бойся, я с тобой	1,200,000	Claimed sales
1998	Ruki Vverh!	Hands Up, Dr. Shyager!	1,000,000	Claimed sales
2000	Децл	Кто? Ты	1,000,000	Claimed sales
2002	Zemfira	14 Weeks of Silence	1,000,000	Claimed sales
2002	t.A.T.u.	200 km/h in the Wrong Lane	1,000,000	Claimed sales
2001	t.A.T.u.	200 Po Vstrechnoy	850,000	Claimed sales
2003	Непара	Другая семья	660,000	Claimed sales
2001	Igorek	Love Without Money	600,000	Claimed sales
	Joseph Kobzon	Anthology	500,000	Claimed sales
	Philipp Kirkorov	Say Yes To the Sun	500,000	Claimed sales
2005	Uma2rman	Maybe It's A Dream?	500,000	Claimed sales

== Singapore ==
Year	Artist	Album	Sales	Origin
1985	Various artists	Class Acts	500,000	Claimed sales
1991	Michael Jackson	Dangerous	220,000	Claimed sales
1993	Jacky Cheung	A Goodbye Kiss	200,000	Claimed sales
1992	Kenny G	Breathless	160,000	Claimed sales
1992	ABBA	ABBA Gold	120,000	Claimed sales
1996	Celine Dion	Falling into You	120,000	Claimed sales
1993	Mariah Carey	Music Box	110,000	Claimed sales
1990	Madonna	The Immaculate Collection	103,000	Claimed sales
1996	Bryan Adams	So Far So Good	100,000	Claimed sales
1999	Westlife	Westlife	93,000	Claimed sales
1989	Madonna	Like a Prayer	82,000	Claimed sales
1992	Eric Clapton	Unplugged	80,000	Claimed sales
1997	Mariah Carey	Butterfly	80,000	Claimed sales
2017	Ed Sheeran	÷	70,000	Certifications

== Sierra Leone ==
Year	Artist	Album	Sales	Origin
	Vicky Fornah	Dis Worl	120,000	Claimed sales
2004	Emmerson Bockarie	Borbor Belleh	120,000	Claimed sales
2010	Emmerson Bockarie	Yesterday Betteh Pass Tiday	72,000	Claimed sales
2014	Emmerson Bockarie	Home and Away	56,000	Claimed sales
2007	Emmerson Bockarie	2 Fut Arata	50,000	Claimed sales
2003	Kallboxx Records	Compilation	15,000	Claimed sales
2016	Emmerson Bockarie	Survivor	12,000	Claimed sales

== South Africa ==
Year	Artist	Album	Sales	Origin
1997	Brenda Fassie	Memeza	700,000	Claimed sales
1996	Celine Dion	Falling into You	600,000	Claimed sales
1987	Lucky Dube	Slave	500,000	Claimed sales
2000	Brenda Fassie	Amadlozi	350,000	Claimed sales
1999	Brenda Fassie	Nomakanjani	350,000	Claimed sales
1936	David de Lange	Suikerbossie	300,000	Claimed sales
1989	Phil Collins	...But Seriously	300,000	Claimed sales
1993	The Dalom Kids	Mbalembale	300,000	Claimed sales
1984	The Soul Brothers	Isithembiso	275,000	Claimed sales
1995	Leon Schuster	Hier Kommie Bokke	275,000	Claimed sales
1996	Rebecca Malope	Uzube Nam	235,000	Claimed sales
2001	Janet Jackson	All For You	200,000	Certifications
1983	Lionel Richie	Can't Slow Down	200,000	Claimed sales
1995	Rebecca Malope	Rebecca	200,000	Claimed sales
1997	Shania Twain	Come On Over	200,000	Certifications
1981	The Soul Brothers	Usathane Simehlulile	200,000	Claimed sales
1965	Various artists	Sound of Music	200,000	Claimed sales

== Slovakia ==
Year	Artist	Album	Sales	Origin
1986	Elán	Detektívka	600,000	Claimed sales
1985	Peter Nagy	Mne sa neschováš	500,000	Claimed sales
1982	Miroslav Žbirka	Sezónne lásky	400,000	Claimed sales
1985	Elán	Hodina slovenčiny	400,000	Claimed sales
1984	Peter Nagy	Chráň svoje bláznovstvá	400,000	Claimed sales

== Slovenia ==
Year	Artist	Album	Sales	Origin
1999	Petar Grašo	Utorak	40,000	Claimed sales
2001	Sebastian	Hočem to nazaj	22,000	Claimed sales
2006	Saša Lendero	Ne grem na kolena	20,000	Claimed sales

== Sweden ==
Year	Artist	Album	Sales	Origin
1983	Carola Häggkvist	Främling	1,000,000	Claimed sales
1977	ABBA	ABBA: The Album	753,420	Claimed sales
1976	ABBA	Arrival	740,000	Claimed sales
1991	Roxette	Joyride	660,000	Claimed sales
1988	Roxette	Look Sharp!	511,000	Claimed sales
1992	ABBA	ABBA Gold	500,000	Claimed sales
1995	Gyllene Tider	Halmstads pärlor	500,000	Claimed sales
1995	Nordman	Nordman	510,000	Claimed sales
1975	ABBA	ABBA	474,642	Claimed sales
1997	Aqua	Aquarium	400,000	Claimed sales
1982	Michael Jackson	Thriller	400,000	Claimed sales
2002	Kent	Vapen & ammunition	360,000	Claimed sales
1983	Agnetha Fältskog	Wrap Your Arms Around Me	350,000	Claimed sales
1974	ABBA	Waterloo	349,938	Claimed sales
1992	Soundtrack	The Bodyguard	343,000	Claimed sales
2003	Per Gessle	Mazarin	330,000	Claimed sales
1977	Baccara	Baccara	322,000	Claimed sales
1996	Cornelis Vreeswijk	Guldkorn från Mäster Cees memoarer	320,000	Claimed sales
1991	Michael Jackson	Dangerous	300,000	Claimed sales

== Switzerland ==
Year	Album	Artist	Certification	Shipments
1992	Gold: Greatest Hits	ABBA	10× Platinum	500,000
1985	Brothers in Arms	Dire Straits	6× Platinum+Platinum	350,000
1997	Romanza	Andrea Bocelli	7× Platinum	350,000
1982	Thriller	Michael Jackson	6× Platinum	300,000
1997	Let's Talk About Love	Celine Dion	6× Platinum	300,000
1981	Greatest Hits	Queen	5× Platinum	250,000
1987	Dirty Dancing	Various Artists	5× Platinum	250,000
1989	...But Seriously	Phil Collins	5× Platinum	250,000
1991	Greatest Hits II	Queen	5× Platinum	250,000
1991	Dangerous	Michael Jackson	5× Platinum	250,000
1992	The Bodyguard	Whitney Houston / Various Artists	5× Platinum	250,000
1998	Uf u dervo	Gölä & Band	5× Platinum	250,000

== Tanzania ==
Year	Artist	Album	Sales	Origin
2002	T.I.D	Sauti ya Dhahabu	200,000	Claimed sales

- Additional information: Between 1999 and 2001 "several rappers" sold over 100,000 copies of their albums. Dudubaya sold 25,000 copies with Papo na Papo (2004) in its first-week.

== Thailand ==
Year	Artist	Album	Sales	Origin
2002	Thongchai McIntyre	Choot Rub Kaek	8,000,000	Claimed sales
1994	Christina Aguilar	Hot Code Red Beat	3,000,000	Claimed sales
1991	Thongchai McIntyre	Prik-Kee-Nu	3,000,000	Claimed sales
1998	Loso	Entertainment	2,000,000	Claimed sales
1992	Mai Charoenpura	Kwam-Lab-Sood-Korb-Fah	2,000,000	Claimed sales
	Nicole Terlo	Bussaba Na Pen	2,000,000	Claimed sales
2004	Thongchai McIntyre / Seksan Sukpimai	Bird-Sek	2,000,000	Claimed sales
1990	Thongchai McIntyre	Boomerang	2,000,000	Claimed sales
	Bird Thongchai	Chili Paste	1,000,000	Claimed sales
1987	Carabao	Welcome to Thailand	1,000,000	Claimed sales
1996	Carabao	This Round is Cha Cha Cha	1,000,000	Claimed sales
1990	Christina Aguilar	Ninja	1,000,000	Claimed sales
1997	Ruangsak Loychusak	Siren Love	1,000,000	Claimed sales
1995	Tata Young	Amita Tata Young	1,000,000	Claimed sales
1994	Thongchai McIntyre	Thor-Thong	1,000,000	Claimed sales
1998	Thongchai McIntyre	Thongchai Service	1,000,000	Claimed sales
1999	Thongchai McIntyre	Tu-Pleng Saman Prajam Barn	1,000,000	Claimed sales
2001	Thongchai McIntyre	Smile Club	1,000,000	Claimed sales
1993	Various	MEGADANCE 2	1,000,000	Claimed sales

== Ukraine ==
Year	Artist	Album	Sales	Origin
2004	Ruslana	Wild Dances	700,000	Claimed sales
2003	Verka Serduchka	Kha-ra-sho!	500,000	Claimed sales
2002	Zemfira	14 Weeks of Silence	500,000	Claimed sales

== United States ==
=== Puerto Rico ===
Year	Artist	Title	Sales	Origin
1990	Juan Luis Guerra	Bachata Rosa	200,000	Claimed sales
1992	Jerry Rivera	Cuenta Conmigo	160,000	Claimed sales
2004	Hector El Father	Los Anormales	130,000	Claimed sales
1995	Gisselle	Gisselle	100,000	Claimed sales
2000	Samuel Hernández	Faltan 5 Para Las 12: ¡Jesús Llegó!	100,000	Claimed sales
2002	Tego Calderón	El Abayarde	100,000	Claimed sales
2001	La Secta AllStar	AllStar	100,000	Claimed sales
2004	Eddie Dee	12 Discípulos	70,000	Claimed Sales
1980	Julio Iglesias	Hey!	50,000	Claimed sales
1980	José Luis Rodríguez	Atrévete	50,000	Claimed sales

== Uruguay ==
Year	Artist	Album	Sales	Notes
1998	Shakira	Dónde Están los Ladrones?	30,000	Claimed sales
1985	Jaime Roos	Brindis por Pierrot	25,000	Claimed sales
1991	Luis Miguel	Romance	24,000	4 × Platinum
1998	Chayanne	Atado a Tu Amor	24,000	4 × Platinum
2000	Rubén Rada	¿Quien va a Cantar?	24,000	4 × Platinum
2007	Buitres Después de la Una	Canción de Cuna Para Vidas en Jauría	22,000	Claimed sales
1994	El Cuarteto de Nos	Otra Navidad en las Trincheras	20,000	Claimed sales
2000	Chocolate	Chocolate 2000	20,000	Claimed sales
2006	Jaime Roos	Fuera de Ambiente	20,000	5 × Platinum
1990	María Elena Walsh	20 grandes éxitos	18,000	3 × Platinum
1992	Fito Páez	El amor después del amor	18,000	3 × Platinum
1993	Luis Miguel	Aries	18,000	3 × Platinum
1994	Luis Miguel	Segundo Romance	18,000	3 × Platinum
1998	Los Nocheros	Signos	18,000	3 × Platinum
2001	La Vela Puerca	De Bichos y Flores	16,000	4× Platinum
	El Cuarteto de Nos	El Cuarteto de Nos	15,000	3 × Platinum
2013	Violetta	Hoy Somos Más	15,000	Claimed sales
2012	No Te Va Gustar	El Calor del Pleno Invierno	12,000	3 × Platinum

== Venezuela ==
Year	Artist	Album	Sales	Origin
1984	Franco De Vita	Franco De Vita	500,000	Claimed sales
1978	Rubén Blades / Willie Colón	Siembra	500,000; 450,000	Claimed sales
1981	Menudo	Quiero Ser	334,000	Claimed sales
1981	Menudo	Momentos	334,000	Claimed sales
1982	Guillermo Dávila	Ligia Elena soundtrack	300,000	Claimed sales
1982	Soledad Bravo	Caribe	300,000	Claimed sales
1984	Yordano	Yordano	300,000	Claimed sales
1978	Enrique Y Ana	El disco para los pequeños con Enrique y Ana	290,000	Claimed sales
1990	Juan Luis Guerra	Bachata Rosa	250,000	Claimed sales
1983	Daiquiri	Daiquiri	245,000	Claimed sales
1994	Luis Miguel	Segundo Romance	200,000	Claimed sales
1978	Rubén Blades / Willie Colón	Canciones del Solar de los Aburridos	180,000	Claimed sales
1982	Menudo	Por Amor	174,000	Claimed sales
1998	Shakira	Dónde Están los Ladrones?	159,351	Claimed sales
1983	Serenata Guayanesa	Vol. 8: Cantemos Con Los Niños	152,000	Claimed sales
1980	Menudo	Menudo Es Navidad	152,000	Claimed sales
2001	Shakira	Laundry Service	149,733	Claimed sales
1983	Soundtrack	Flashdance	148,000	Claimed sales
1981	Menudo	Fuego	152,000	Claimed sales
1983	Scarlata	Scarlata	123,000	Claimed sales
1992	Jerry Rivera	Cuenta Conmigo	120,000	Claimed sales
1997	Luis Miguel	Romances	120,000	Certifications
1981	Popy	A Cepillarse	119,000	Claimed sales
1983	Bee Gees	Staying Alive	113,000	Claimed sales
1983	Rags & Riches	Land of 1,000 Dances	106,000	Claimed sales
1991	Luis Miguel	Romance	100,000	Claimed sales

^{†} Billboard source gives numbers and the names of the artists, those numbers are specific to lps that can be seen on discogs for identification purposes

== Zimbabwe ==
Year	Artist	Album	Sales	Origin
2000	Alick Macheso	Simbaradzo	400,000	Claimed sales
1994	Leonard Zhakata	Maruva Enyika	180,000	Claimed sales
1991	Leonard Dembo	Chitekete	130,000; 120,000	Claimed sales
1996	Leonard Zhakata	Nzombe Huru	130,000	Claimed sales
2002	Tongai Moyo	Vimbo	100,000	Claimed sales
2002	Tongai Moyo	Samanyemba	100,000	Claimed sales
2003	Tongai Moyo	Chingwa	100,000	Claimed sales
2007	Alick Macheso	Ndezvashe-E	100,000	Claimed sales
1998	Leonard Zhakata	Ndingaitesei	100,000	Claimed sales
1999	Leonard Zhakata	Pakuyambuka	100,000	Claimed sales
1998	Leonard Zhakata	Ndingaitesei	100,000	Claimed sales
1997	Leonard Zhakata	Original Rhythms of Africa	100,000	Claimed sales

- Additional information: According to Media, Democracy and Development (1997), "a very big hit may be in the region of 50 000 copies".

== By region and former countries ==
=== Central America ===
Year	Artist	Album	Sales	Origin
2008	Daddy Yankee	Talento de Barrio	255,000	Claimed sales
1996	Charlie Zaa	Sentimientos	175,000	Claimed sales
1997	Luis Miguel	Romances	100,000	Claimed sales

=== Europe ===
IFPI Platinum Europe Awards (1996–2011)
Year	Artist	Album	Certified sales
1997	Celine Dion	Let's Talk About Love	10,000,000
2011	Adele	21	10,000,000

=== Middle East (Gulf States) ===
IFPI Middle East Awards (2008–2010)
Year	Artist	Album	Certified sales
2008	High School Musical	High School Musical 3: Senior Year	18,000
2008	Akon	Freedom	12,000

=== USSR ===
Year	Artist	Album	Sales	Origin
1978	Alla Pugacheva	Zerkalo dushi	7,750,000	Claimed sales
1982	Autograph	Autograph-1	6,000,000	Claimed sales
1980	Zodiac	Disco Alliance	5,360,000	Claimed sales
1984	Alla Pugacheva	Soviet Superstar. Greatest Hits 1976–84	5,000,000	Claimed sales
1985	Various Artists	Greenpeace – The Album	4,000,000	Claimed sales
1971	Pesniary	Ты мне вясною прыснiлася	3,000,000	Claimed sales
1982	Vladimir Vysotsky	Songs By Vysotsky	1,800,000	Claimed sales
1986	Aquarium	Red Wave	1,300,000	Claimed sales
1985	Alla Pugacheva	Alla Pugachova Live in Stockholm	1,200,000	Claimed sales
1987	Aquarium	Ravnodenstvie	1,000,000	Claimed sales
1989	Vladimir Kuzmin	Слёзы в огне	1,000,000	Claimed sales
1988	Vladimir Kuzmin	Смотри на меня сегодня	1,000,000	Claimed sales
1987	Vladimir Kuzmin	Ромео и Джульетта	1,000,000	Claimed sales
1990	Mister Twister	Мистер Твистер	1,000,000	Claimed sales

== Yugoslavia ==
Year	Artist	Album	Sales	Origin
1982	Danijel Popović	Bio sam naivan	725,000	Claimed sales
1981	Novi fosili	Budi uvijek blizu	712,000	Claimed sales
1971	Mišo Kovač	Mišo Kovač	700,000	Claimed sales
1990	Hari Mata Hari	Strah me da te volim	700,000	Claimed sales
1980	Zdravko Čolić	Ako Priđeš Bliže	700,000	Claimed sales
1986	Magazin	Put putujem	670,000	Claimed sales
1985	Neda Ukraden	Hoću tebe	650,000	Claimed sales
1987	Magazin	Magazin	630,000	Claimed sales
1982	Lepa Brena	Mile voli disko	600,000	Claimed sales
1979	Srebrna krila	Srebrna krila	600,000	Claimed sales
1985	Plavi orkestar	Soldatski bal	600,000	Claimed sales
1986	Đorđe Balašević	Bezdan	500,000	Claimed sales
1989	Hari Mata Hari	Volio bi' da te ne volim	500,000	Claimed sales
1981	Riblja Čorba	Mrtva priroda	471,000	Claimed sales
1982	Zana	Dodirni mi kolena	400,000	Claimed sales
1981	Zdravko Čolić	Zbog Tebe	400,000	Claimed sales
1982	Neda Ukraden	To Mora Da Je Ljubav	350,000	Claimed sales
1983	Rokeri s Moravu	Krkenzi kikiriki evri dej	300,000	Claimed sales
1981	Zdravko Čolić	Malo pojačaj radio	300,000	Claimed sales
1982	Darko Domijan	SUze u snijegu	250,000	Claimed sales
1982	Neda Ukraden	Oči Tvoje Govore	250,000	Claimed sales
1983	Zana	Natrag na voz	200,000	Claimed sales
1982	Divlje Jagode	Motori	200,000	Claimed sales
1983	Idoli	Čokolada	200,000	Claimed sales
1987	Oliver Dragojević	Oliver	200,000	Claimed sales
1980	Prljavo Kazalište	Crno-bijeli svijet	200,000	Claimed sales
1982	Srebrna krila	Zadnja ploča	200,000	Claimed sales
1974	Tihomir Pop Asanović	Majko Zemljo	200,000	Claimed sales
1987	Boris Novković	Jači od sudbine	180,000	Claimed sales
1982	Darko Domijan	Put u raj	170,000	Claimed sales
1978	Novi Fosili	Da Te Ne Volim	170,000	Claimed sales
1986	Boris Novković	Kuda idu izgubljene djevojke	160,000	Claimed sales
1981	Mišo Kovač	Jači od vjetra	160,000	Claimed sales
1983	Tomislav Ivčić	Talijanska ploča	150,000	Claimed sales

== See also ==
- List of best-selling albums
  - List of best-selling albums of the 21st century
  - List of best-selling remix albums
  - List of best-selling albums by women
  - List of best-selling Latin albums
- List of best-selling singles by country

== Notes ==
- ^{‡}Certification include on-demand audio and video streams and track sale equivalent
