= Live from Vatnagarðar =

Live album by Of Monsters and Men
- Released: 10 December 2013
- Studios: Studio Sýrland, Vatnagarðar, Reykjavík
- Genres: Indie folk; indie rock; indie pop
- Length: 29:19
- Label: Republic

Of Monsters and Men chronology
My Head Is an Animal (2011)	Live from Vatnagarðar (2013)	Beneath the Skin (2015)

Live from Vatnagarðar is the first live album by the Icelandic band Of Monsters and Men, recorded at Studio Sýrland in Vatnagarðar and released digitally through Republic Records worldwide on 20 September 2013. The album consists of six tracks from their previous album—four concert versions, an acoustic version, and a sombre take on their happiest-sounding song—, plus the cover song of their second tour: Yeah Yeah Yeahs' "Skeletons". The first concert performance of this album's version of Little Talks was during the first concert of the band's "May/June North American Tour", at The Orpheum in Vancouver, BC, Canada on 12 May 2013.

== Track listing ==
No.	Title	Writer(s)	Length
1.	"Slow and Steady" (Concert version)	Nanna Bryndís Hilmarsdóttir; Ragnar Þórhallsson; Arnar Rósenkranz Hilmarsson; Árni Guðjónsson; Brynjar Leifsson; Kristján Páll Kristjánsson	5:19
2.	"Mountain Sound" (Concert version)	Nanna; Ragnar; Arnar	3:35
3.	"King and Lionheart" (Acoustic version)	Nanna	2:58
4.	"Dirty Paws" (Concert version)	Nanna; Ragnar	5:01
5.	"Skeletons" (Yeah Yeah Yeahs cover)	Brian Chase; Karen Lee Orzolek; Nicholas Joseph Zinner	3:27
6.	"Little Talks" (Sombre version)	Nanna; Ragnar	3:33
7.	"Six Weeks" (Concert version)	Ragnar; Arnar	5:26
Total length:			29:19
