= Darko Domijan =

Croatian pop singer

- Born: 5 February 1952; Karlovac, FPR Yugoslavia
- Occupation: Singer
- Years active: 1972–1989

Darko Domijan (5 February 1952) is a Croatian pop singer who was most popular in the 1970s and 1980s. His best known songs include "Ulica jorgovana", "Jelena Je Bila Lijepa", "Ruže u snijegu" and "Sedam suza", the latter two being Croatian-language covers of "Sun of Jamaica" and "Seven Tears", respectively, by Goombay Dance Band.

Since his retirement from music in 1989, Domijan has been working as an attorney in Zagreb.

== Discography ==
Releases:

- "Laku noć, Katarina" / "Je l' istina ono što govore o tebi" (7", Single), Jugoton, 1974
- "Julske Kiše" / "Ljetnje Noći" (7", Single), Jugoton, 1977
- Darko Domijan, 1980
- Ruže u snijegu, 1983
- Sve Najbolje, 2001

Tracks Appear On:

- Festival Zabavne Glazbe Split (2xLP, Comp) with: "Moja Romantika", Jugoton, 1981
- Slavonija '81 (LP, Album) with: "Zapjevala Slavonija Naša", Jugoton, 1981
- Split '82 with "Mirišu ti kose", 1982
- ZagrebFest 82 (LP, Comp) with "O, Nela", Jugoton, 1982
- Split 83 with: "Anči", 1983
- Split 84 with: "Nikad više", 1984
- Hitovi Hitovi (Zagreb Fest '85) (Cass, Comp) with "Zlato Moje", Jugoton, 1985
- Split 85 with: "Zadnja noć", 1985
- Split 86 with: "Što bi bilo, kad bi bilo"
- Zvuk osamdesetih Zabavna i Pop 1982 – 1983 with: "Sedam suza", 2002
- Koprivnica 2004. with: "Ti samo...", 2004
- Retromanija Osamdesetih (2xCD) with: "Ulica Jorgovana", City Records (2), 2006
- Đorđe Novković – Gold collection, 2007

== Sources ==
- Diskografija on Darko Domijan
- Discogs on Darko Domijan
