= Oliver Bendt =

German singer and actor

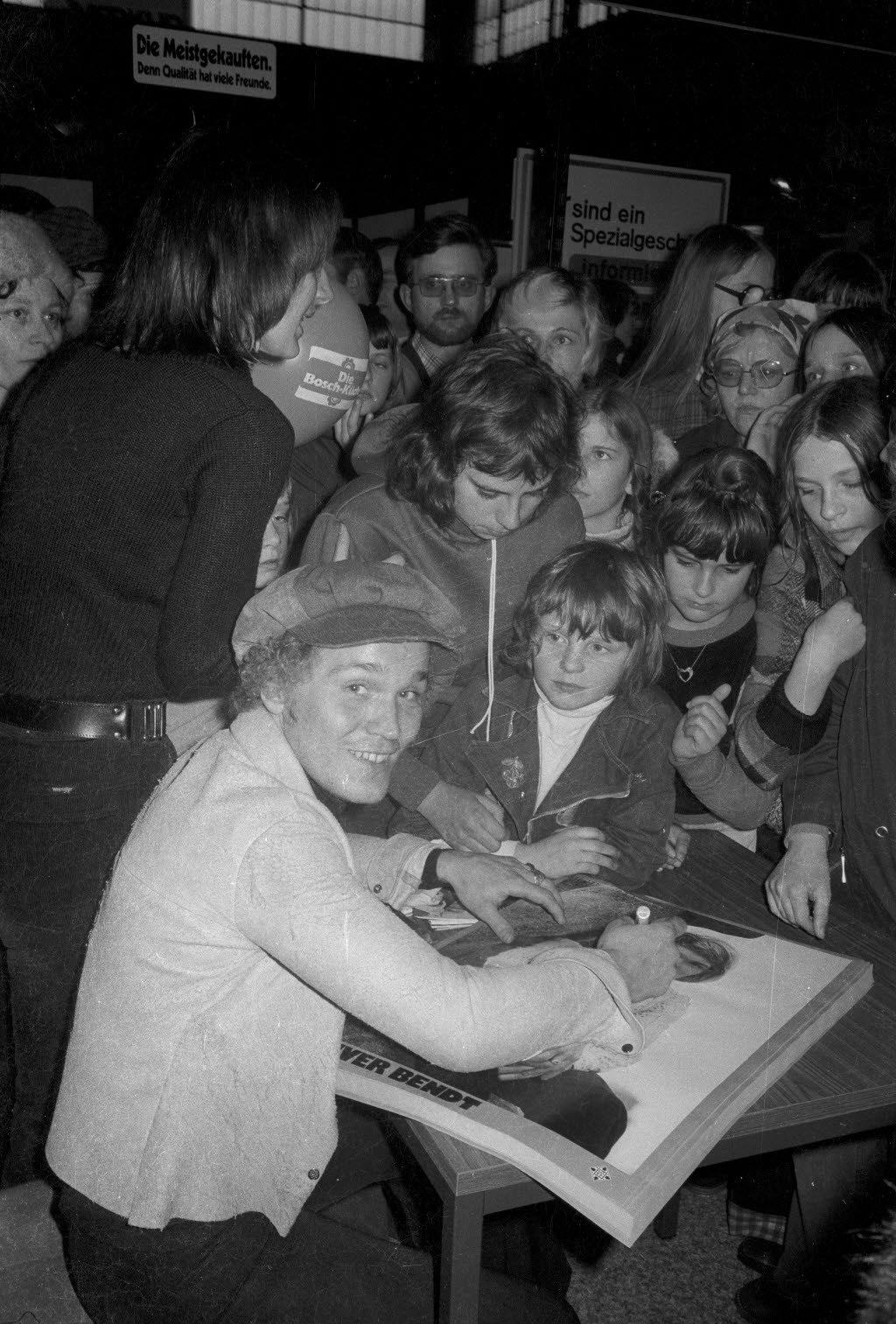
Bendt in 1975

Oliver Bendt (born Jörg Knoch on 29 October 1946 in Potsdam) is a German singer and actor.

Knoch grew up the son of an actress in Munich, where he played children's roles in several films, including Königswalzer (1955) and Weil du arm bist, musst du früher sterben (1956). He received his first violin, piano and guitar lessons and became a member of the Regensburg Cathedral Boys Choir, where he received vocal training, and completed his vocal studies at the Hochschule für Musik und Theater Hamburg. In 1967, he competed at the Ralf Arnie Musikverlag as a junior and came into a career as a singer under the name "George" in 1967 and 1968 with four single records. At the same time he sang with the German production of the musical Hair. Later, he renamed himself Oliver Bendt and had more success with cover versions of English hits, including What I did, I did for Maria, I'll come back to Amarillo, My Song for Mary and Oh, Marie.

Towards the end of the 1970s, he lived for some time on the Caribbean island of Saint Lucia. Here he had the idea for the Goombay Dance Band, which brought him his greatest successes in 1979/1980. The greatest success in Germany was the song Sun of Jamaica. Internationally it was Seven Tears. This single sold 11 million copies, and was in the chart for 12 weeks in the UK including three weeks at number one.

Bendt lives with his family in Norderstedt near Hamburg; he met his wife in St. Lucia.
