= Rock al Parque =

Rock music festival in Bogotá, Colombia

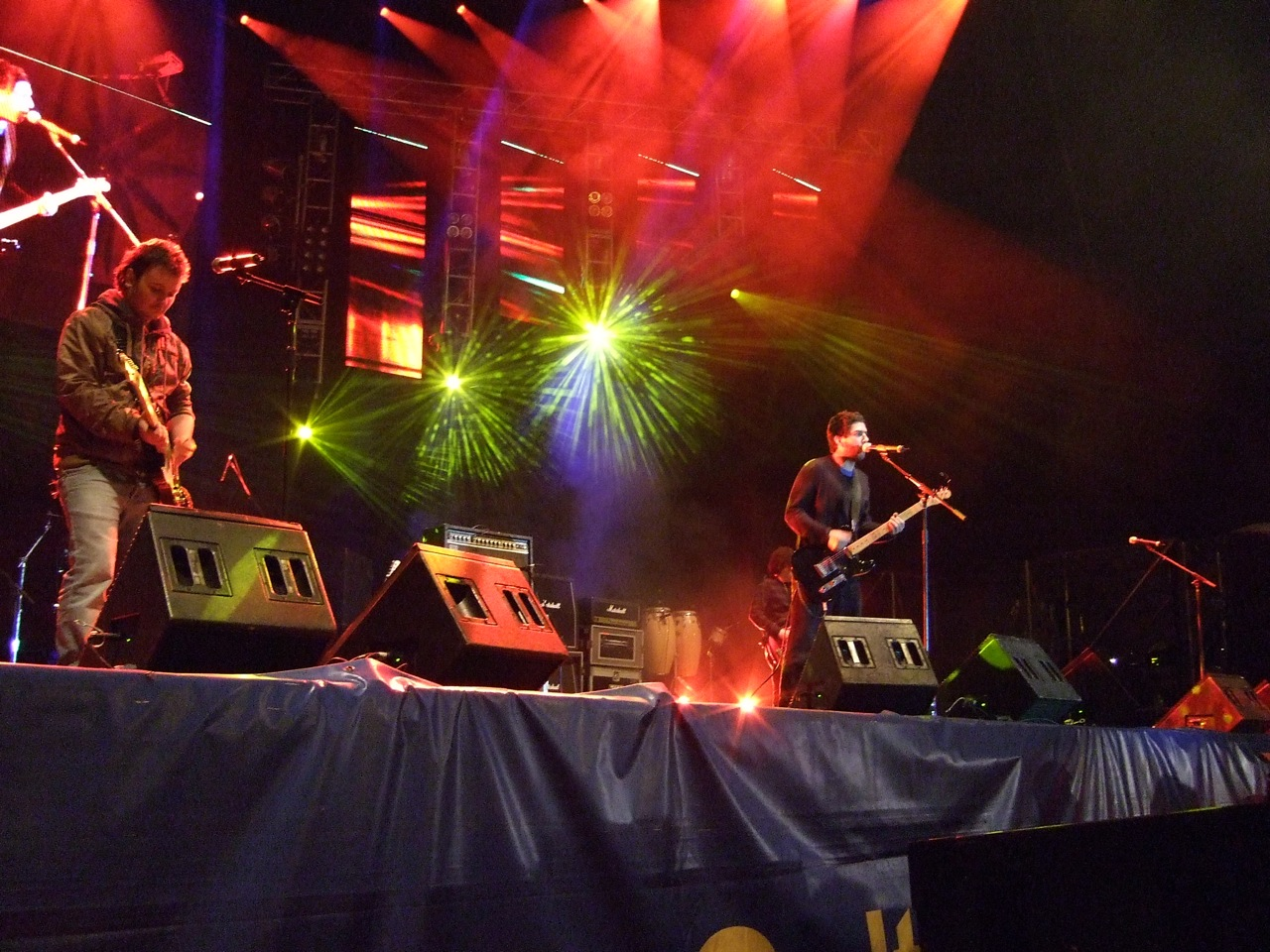
- Genre: Heavy metal, punk rock, rock
- Location: Bogotá, Colombia
- Years active: 1995–present
- Attendance: 400,000+ (2014)
- Website: Official Website (in Spanish)

Rock al Parque is a free rock music festival which has taken place in Bogotá, Colombia, since 1995. It typically gathers more than 50 bands and as many as 400,000 spectators. It is considered the largest rock festival in Colombia and one of the most important in Latin America. Its programme also includes ska, punk, hardcore, metal, and other genres.

== History ==
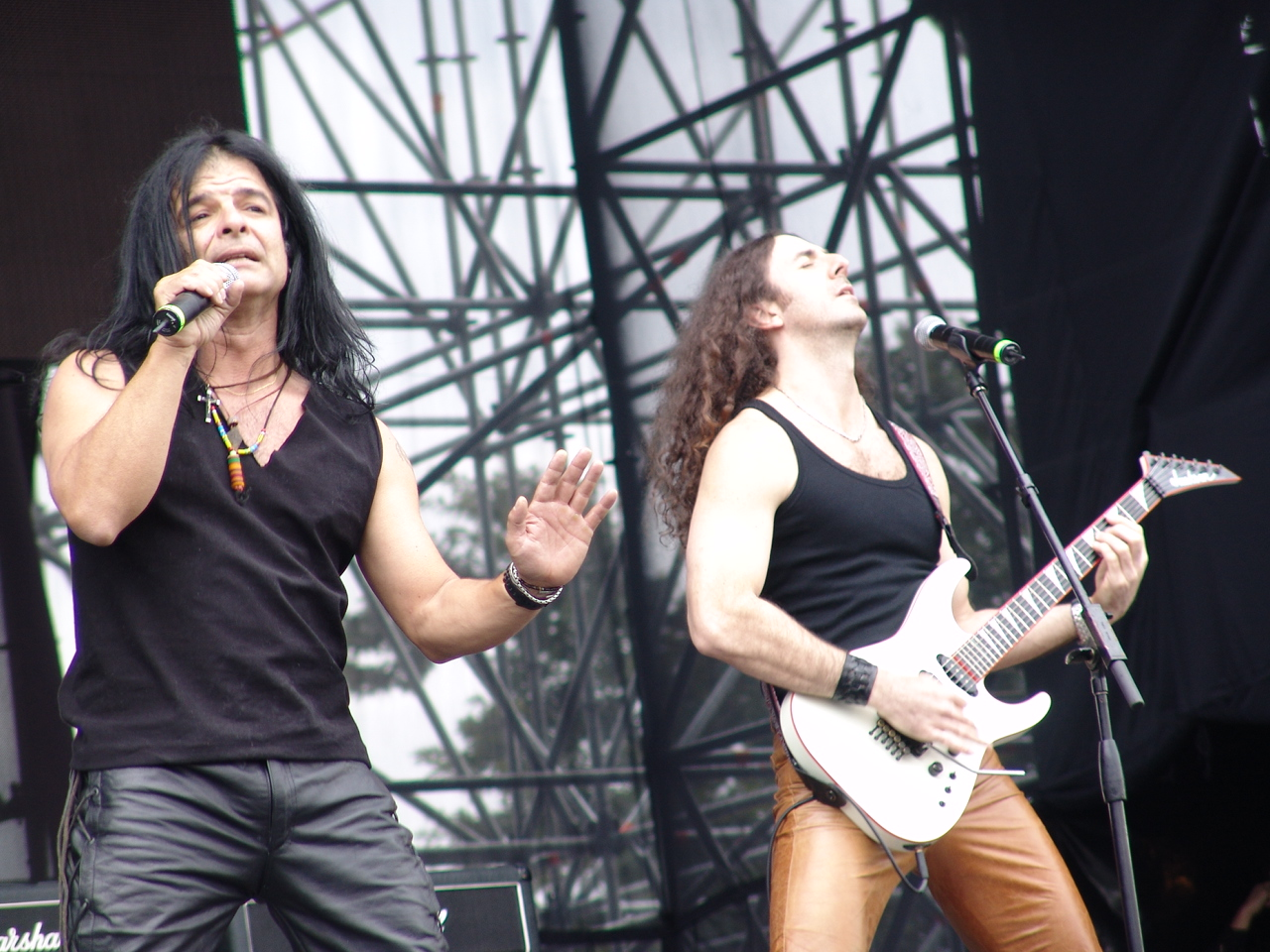
Rock al Parque 2008

The first edition of the Rock Al Parque festival was held in Bogotá, 26–29 May 1995. It started as a continuation of the 'Youth Music meetings' held at the city's planetarium in 1992. The people behind the organization were Mario Duarte, Julio Correal and Bertha Quintero. They initially sought to gain the support of Bogota's Institute of Culture and Tourism, to help establish the festival. It was held across several venues including 'La Media Torta', Simón Bolívar Park, the 'Olaya Herrera' stadium, and the 'Santa María Bullfighting' ring. The last venue asked for admission fees, and was excluded after 1996 to keep the festival free of charge.

The rock music festival gradually included other genres, such as punk, reggae, ska and blues music. Rather than grouping genres together, the festival's organizers promoted diversity by scheduling different types of musicians to participate alongside one another.

Nowadays the festival takes place over three days at Simon Bolivar Park and is broadcast live over public television channel Canal Capital and public radio network Radiónica.

Concertgoers are not allowed entry if they are wearing belts with metallic buckles, as these can be used as weapons. Furthermore, all concertgoers have to go through a routine security inspection before entering the concert grounds. Concerts are scheduled between 1:00 p.m. and 10:00 p.m.

== Participants ==
The festival features national and international bands of different genres. After 1997, artists were selected by a jury after an open multi-stage process (pre-selection, presentation and live auditions). Prizes are awarded to the selected bands, who also gain media exposure and opportunity to share a stage with international bands. Some acts are directly invited by the organizing committee. In its first 15 years, the festival brought 473 artists to 3,092,000 attendees. The 1997 edition of the festival had the largest number of acts, with 87 bands, while the 2002 edition had the fewest, with 25. On average, 51.6 bands have performed annually at Rock al Parque. The 2004 edition, which marked the festival's 10th anniversary, had over 400,000 spectators.

=== International musicians ===
The festival has hosted to a number of musical artists from other countries, including:

| Country | Invited Bands |
|---|---|
| Argentina | Siete Delfines, Divididos, Luis Alberto Spinetta, A.N.I.M.A.L., Timmy O´ Tool, Divididos, Mississippi Blues Band, Cabezones, Botafogo, Carajo, Catupecu Machu, Auténticos Decadentes, Karamelo Santo, Todos tus Muertos, Miranda!, Babasónicos, Turf, Los Pericos, Azafata, Horcas, La Mosca Tse Tse, Capri, Fito Páez, Árbol, Los Cafres, Andres Calamaro, Charly García, Eruca Sativa, Illya Kuryaki and the Valderramas, Jaque Reina, malón, Juana Molina, Capsula, Gustavo Cordera y la Caravana Mágica. |
| Belgium | Aborted |
| Bolivia | Octavia |
| Brazil | Niños Con Bombas, Eminence, Ratos de Porão, Lenine, Black Drawing Chalks, Krisiun, Sepultura |
| Chile | Chancho en Piedra, Criminal, Floripondio, Funkreal, Niños Con Bombas, Dracma, The Ganjas, Gondwana, Guiso, Los Bunkers, Los Tetas, Surtek Collective, Los Mox!, Lucybell, Hoppo!, Gepe, Los Miserables, Banda Conmoción, Sinergia |
| Costa Rica | Las Robertas |
| Denmark | Nekromantix |
| Ecuador | La Trifulca, Rocola Bacalao, Sal y Mileto, Obscura, Muscaria, SIQ, Cruks en Karnak, Descomunal, Sudakaya, Prime Ministers |
| El Salvador | Adhesivo, Easy Easy |
| Finland | Apocalyptica |
| France | Manu Chao, Sergent Garcia, Ina Ich, Dub Incorporation |
| Germany | Niños Con Bombas, Haggard, Destruction, Atari Teenage Riot, Atom Tm. |
| Guyana | Mad Professor |
| Israel | Melechesh |
| Italy | Blonde Redhead |
| Jamaica | The Skatalites, Ky-Mani Marley, Black Uhuru, Junior Kelly |
| Japan | Blonde Redhead |
| Netherlands | Laberinto Epica |
| Mexico | Café Tacvba, Fobia, Jaguares, Maldita Vecindad, Molotov, Panda, Resorte, Telefunka, Kinky, Austin TV, Riesgo de Contagio, Los Concorde, Panteón Rococó, Brujería, División Minúscula, Zoé, Plastilina Mosh, Control Machete, Julieta Venegas, Elis Paprika, Thermo, La Lupita, Guillotina, Ely Guerra, Las Víctimas del Doctor Cerebro, Finde, Quiero Club, El Gran Silencio, Volován, Nortec, Dildo, Inspector, Instituto Mexicano del Sonido, The Warning, Hello Seahorse!, Rebel Cats, Hoppo, Frikstailers, Agora, La Gusana Ciega, Juan Cirerol, Celso Piña, Los Viejos |
| Panama | Cienfue, Filtro Medusa, Señor Loop |
| Peru | La Sarita, Libido, Zopilotes, Huelga de hambre |
| Poland | Behemoth, Vader, Decapited |
| Portugal | Buraka Som Sistema, Fischerspooner |
| Puerto Rico | Puya, Robi Draco Rosa |
| Sierra Leone | Sierra Leone's Refugee All Stars |
| South Africa | Blk Jks |
| Spain | La Kinky Beat, Seguridad Social, Fritanga, Kop, Tom Cary, Def con Dos, Vita Imana, Los toreros muertos, Delorean, Siniestro Total, Nacho Vegas, Vetusta Morla, Soziedad Alkoholika, Against The Waves, Bala. |
| Switzerland | Samael |
| United Kingdom | Paradise Lost, Carcass, Bloc Party, Asian Dub Foundation, Anti-Nowhere League, Skindred, Steel Pulse, GBH |
| United States | Exodus, Dead Kennedys, D.R.I., Overkill, Draco Rosa, Coheed And Cambria, Earth Crisis, Fear Factory, Have Heart, Suicidal Tendencies, VHS or BETA, Black Rebel Motorcycle Club, Volumen Cero, Agent Steel, Death by Stereo, Anthrax, Día de los Muertos, Monstrosity, Morbid Angel, Mutemath, Shadows Fall, Biohazard, A Place to Bury Strangers, Stick To Your Guns, Cold Cave, NOFX, Inquisition, The Dillnger Escape Plan, Saul Williams, Corpse, Symphony X, Downset, Living Colour, Bosnian Rainbows, Nile, Fishbone, Outernational, Blonde Redhead, Black Label Society, aro-in, Nuclear Assault, Total Chaos, POD, The Coup, Nortec Collective, Adrenaline Mob, Ill Niño, Napalm Death, The Black Dahlia Murder, Sick Of It All, Deafheaven, Baroness |
| Uruguay | Cuarteto De Nos, No te va gustar |
| Venezuela | Claroscuro, Los Amigos Invisibles, Desorden Público, Plomo, Pan, Agresión, Los Oceánicos, Sur Carabela, Caramelos de Cianuro, King Changó, Papashanty, Spías, Zapato 3, Chuck Norris, Candy 66, Dischord, Los Mentas. |
