= Beneath the Skin (Of Monsters and Men album) =

Studio album by Of Monsters and Men
- Released: 8 June 2015
- Recorded: 2014–2015
- Genres: Indie folk; indie pop; indie rock
- Length: 48:33
- Label: Republic
- Producers: Of Monsters and Men; Rich Costey

Of Monsters and Men chronology
Live from Vatnagarðar (2013)	Beneath the Skin (2015)	Fever Dream (2019)

Icelandic release

Singles from Beneath the Skin
- 1. "Crystals" Released: 16 March 2015; 2. "I of the Storm" Released: 28 April 2015; 3. "Empire" Released: 14 May 2015; 4. "Hunger" Released: 26 May 2015; 5. "Wolves Without Teeth" Released: 27 January 2016

Beneath the Skin is the second studio album by Icelandic band Of Monsters and Men. It was released on 8 June 2015 in Iceland, and a day later in the rest of the world. The album artwork and design was created by artistic director Leif Podhajsky. It debuted at number three on US Billboard 200, and sold 61,000 copies in its first week, becoming the band's highest-charting album in the country.

The album title is derived from a lyric in the song "Human": "Plants awoke and they slowly grow beneath the skin."

The album was nominated for Best Boxed or Special Limited Edition Package at the 58th Annual Grammy Awards.

== Reception ==
=== Critical reception ===
Professional ratings
Aggregate scores
Source	Rating
Metacritic	63/100
Review scores
Source	Rating
Billboard	3.5/5 stars
Consequence of Sound	C
Entertainment Weekly	B
Q	3.5/5 stars
Sputnikmusic	4/5

Beneath the Skin received generally positive reviews from music critics. At Metacritic, which assigns a normalized rating out of 100 to reviews from mainstream critics, the album received an average score of 63, based on 15 reviews, which indicates "generally favorable reviews". Madison Vain of Entertainment Weekly stated, "Lyrics brim with woodsy imagery, and the sweet vocals elevate these campfire tunes into something extravagant.

=== Commercial performance ===
On the chart dated 27 June 2015, Beneath the Skin debuted at number 3 on the US Billboard 200 chart with 61,000 copies in the first week of its release (including 57,000 pure album sales), becoming the highest-charting album by the band there. Its first-week sales made it the best sales week of the band.

The album also made it entry at number 10 on the UK Albums Chart, selling 8,437 copies. It dropped to number 40 with 2,749 units in the second week on chart.

== Track listing ==
All songs are credited to Of Monsters and Men, but were actually written by the band's individuals and/or others. The actual writers are listed alongside the tracks.

Icelandic release
No.	Title	Writer(s)	Length
1.	"Crystals"	Nanna Bryndís Hilmarsdóttir; Ragnar Þórhallsson; Arnar Rósenkranz Hilmarsson	4:02
2.	"Human"	Nanna; Ragnar	3:58
3.	"Hunger"	Nanna; Ragnar	4:50
4.	"Wolves Without Teeth"	Nanna; Ragnar; Arnar	3:58
5.	"Empire"	Nanna; Ragnar; Arnar	4:22
6.	"Winter Sound"	Nanna; Ragnar; Arnar	3:42
7.	"Slow Life"	Nanna; Ragnar; Arnar	5:43
8.	"Organs"	Nanna; Ragnar	4:31
9.	"Black Water"	Nanna; Ragnar; Arnar	4:13
10.	"Thousand Eyes"	Nanna; Ragnar	4:02
11.	"I of the Storm"	Nanna; Ragnar; Arnar	4:36
12.	"We Sink"	Nanna; Ragnar; Arnar	4:23
13.	"Backyard"	Nanna; Ragnar	4:19

Universal Music Group "standard" release
No.	Title	Length
1.	"Crystals"	4:02
2.	"Human"	3:58
3.	"Hunger"	4:50
4.	"Wolves Without Teeth"	3:58
5.	"Empire"	4:22
6.	"Slow Life"	5:43
7.	"Organs"	4:31
8.	"Black Water"	4:13
9.	"Thousand Eyes"	4:02
10.	"I of the Storm"	4:36
11.	"We Sink"	4:23
Total length:		48:33

Universal Music Group "deluxe" release
No.	Title	Length
12.	"Backyard"	4:19
13.	"Winter Sound"	3:42
14.	"Black Water" (Chris Taylor of Grizzly Bear Remix)	4:27
15.	"I of the Storm" (Alex Somers Remix)	4:32
Total length:		65:33

== Personnel ==
=== Of Monsters and Men ===
- Nanna Bryndís Hilmarsdóttir – vocals, guitar
- Ragnar Þórhallsson – vocals, guitar
- Brynjar Leifsson – guitar
- Kristján Páll Kristjánsson – bass
- Arnar Rósenkranz Hilmarsson – drums, percussion

=== Additional musicians ===
- Steingrímur Karl Teague – keyboards
- Walter Simonsen – trumpet
- Erm Navarro – trombone
- Robert Brophy – viola
- Charlie Bisharat – violin
- Josefina Vergara – violin
- Lisa McCormick – french horn
- Paula Hochhalter – bass trombone
- Stephen Hughes – cello

=== Technical ===
- Of Monsters and Men – producer
- Rich Costey – producer, mixing
- Bob Ludwig – mastering
- Martin Cooke – engineering

=== Artwork and design ===
- Leif Podhajsky – artwork, graphic design

== Charts ==
=== Weekly charts ===
Weekly chart performance for Beneath the Skin
Chart (2015)	Peak position
Australian Albums (ARIA)	4
Austrian Albums (Ö3 Austria)	20
Belgian Albums (Ultratop Flanders)	23
Belgian Albums (Ultratop Wallonia)	50
Canadian Albums (Billboard)	1
Dutch Albums (Album Top 100)	17
French Albums (SNEP)	62
German Albums (Offizielle Top 100)	10
Icelandic Albums (Tonlist)	2
Italian Albums (FIMI)	28
New Zealand Albums (RMNZ)	10
Norwegian Albums (VG-lista)	40
Spanish Albums (Promusicae)	27
Swiss Albums (Schweizer Hitparade)	6
UK Albums (Official Charts)	10
US Billboard 200	3
US Top Rock Albums (Billboard)	2

=== Year-end charts ===
2015 year-end chart performance for Beneath the Skin
Chart (2015)	Position
Canadian Albums (Billboard)	33
US Top Rock Albums (Billboard)	32

2016 year-end chart performance for Beneath the Skin
Chart (2016)	Position
Icelandic Albums (Plötutíóindi)	9

== Certifications ==
Certifications for Beneath the Skin
Region	Certification	Certified units/sales
Canada (Music Canada)	Gold	40,000^{^}
United Kingdom (BPI)	Silver	60,000^{‡}
^{^} Shipments figures based on certification alone.^{‡} Sales+streaming figures based on certification alone.
