= I of the Storm =

Single by Of Monsters and Men

from the album Beneath the Skin
- Released: 28 April 2015
- Recorded: 2015
- Genre: Indie folk; indie pop
- Length: 4:41
- Label: Republic
- Songwriters: Nanna Bryndís Hilmarsdóttir; Ragnar Þórhallsson; Arnar Rósenkranz Hilmarsson
- Producers: Of Monsters and Men; Rich Costey

Of Monsters and Men singles chronology
"Crystals" (2015)	"I of the Storm" (2015)	"Empire" (2015)

Music video
- "I of the Storm" on YouTube

"I of the Storm" is a single recorded by the Icelandic indie folk/indie pop rock band Of Monsters and Men. The song was released as the second single from their second studio album, Beneath the Skin (2015). It was written by band members Nanna Bryndís Hilmarsdóttir, Ragnar Þórhallsson and Arnar Rósenkranz Hilmarsson. The single artwork was created by artistic director Leif Podhajsky.

== Lyric video ==
The lyric video was released to the public via YouTube on 28 April 2015.

The lyric video begins with the single cover and, when the drums start, the actor Atli Freyr Demantur starts to dub the song's verses. The video was directed by Tjarnargatan.

== Track listing ==
Digital download / CD
No.	Title	Writer(s)	Length
1.	"I of the Storm"	Nanna Bryndís Hilmarsdóttir; Ragnar Þórhallsson; Arnar Rósenkranz Hilmarsson	4:41
