= Las Robertas =

Costa Rican band

- Origin: San José, Costa Rica
- Genres: Indie rock, psychedelia
- Years active: 2009–present
- Members: Mercedes Oller; Fabrizio Durán; Russell Sánchez; Daniela Quesada
- Past members: Monserrat Vargas; Franco Valenciano; Sonya Carmona

Las Robertas are a Costa Rican band. They have released five albums since their formation in 2009, most recently All We Need is Now in 2026, and have toured in the Americas and Europe.

== History ==
Mercedes Oller (guitar, vocals), Monserrat Vargas (bass), and Franco Valenciano (drums) formed Las Robertas in San José, Costa Rica, in 2009. Their debut album Cry Out Loud was released by Art Fag Recordings in 2010, and later re-released by Arts & Crafts Records. Las Robertas toured Cry Out Loud internationally, and played at festivals including Primavera Sound, SXSW, and Rock al Parque.

Las Robertas' second album Days Unmade was released in 2014. Vargas and Valenciano then left the band, and Oller was joined by Fabrizio Durán (drums) and Sonya Carmona (bass and vocals) for Las Robertas' third album Waves of the New in 2017. Alt.Latino described Waves of the New as "a sunny set of tunes tinged with surf-rock and psychedelia".

In 2023, Las Robertas released their fourth album Love Is the Answer on Kanine Records. Carmona had left the band, and Oller and Durán were joined by Russell Sánchez (guitar) and Daniela Quesada (keyboard). The album was produced by Owen Morris. Their fifth album All We Need is Now was released in 2026.

== Albums ==
- Cry Out Loud (2010)
- Days Unmade (2014)
- Waves of the New (2017)
- Love Is the Answer (2023)
- All We Need is Now (2026)
