= Empire (Of Monsters and Men song) =

Single by Of Monsters and Men

from the album Beneath the Skin
- Released: 14 May 2015
- Recorded: 2015
- Genre: Indie folk; indie pop
- Length: 4:20
- Label: Republic
- Songwriters: Nanna Bryndís Hilmarsdóttir; Ragnar Þórhallsson; Arnar Rósenkranz Hilmarsson
- Producers: Of Monsters and Men; Rich Costey

Of Monsters and Men singles chronology
"I of the Storm" (2015)	"Empire" (2015)	"Hunger" (2015)

Music video
- "Empire" on YouTube

"Empire" is a single recorded by the Icelandic indie folk/indie pop rock band Of Monsters and Men. The song was released as the third single from their second studio album, Beneath the Skin (2015). It was written by band members Nanna Bryndís Hilmarsdóttir, Ragnar Þórhallsson, and Arnar Rósenkranz Hilmarsson.

== Music video ==
A music video was released on 7 August 2015. It was filmed in black and white and features a young woman who has a very close relationship with another woman. The two of them hang out and it is implied that the young woman looks up to the other woman as a mentor figure in life. Time passes and it is revealed that it was just flashbacks as the young woman – now old – reflects on her life and wonders if she has really changed.

== Lyric video ==
A lyric video was released on 15 May 2015, featuring actress Guðrún Bjarnadóttir lip-syncing the song's lyrics.

== Commercial performance ==
"Empire" peaked at number twenty five on Iceland's Tónlistinn chart and at number thirty three on the Rock & Alternative Airplay chart.

== Track listing ==
Digital download / CD
No.	Title	Writer(s)	Length
1.	"Empire"	Nanna Bryndís Hilmarsdóttir; Ragnar Þórhallsson; Arnar Rósenkranz Hilmarsson	4:20
