= Crystals (song) =

Single by Of Monsters and Men

from the album Beneath the Skin
- Released: 16 March 2015
- Genre: Indie folk; indie pop
- Length: 4:02
- Label: Republic
- Songwriters: Nanna Bryndís Hilmarsdóttir; Ragnar Þórhallsson; Arnar Rósenkranz Hilmarsson
- Producers: Of Monsters and Men; Rich Costey

Of Monsters and Men singles chronology
"King and Lionheart" (2013)	"Crystals" (2015)	"I of the Storm" (2015)

Music video
- "Crystals" on YouTube

"Crystals" is a song written and recorded by Icelandic indie folk/indie pop band Of Monsters and Men. It is the lead single for their second studio album, Beneath the Skin. The single and album artwork was created by artistic director Leif Podhajsky. The song appeared in The CW's "Dare to Defy" promo as well as the first trailer for Disney and Pixar's The Good Dinosaur. The song was also featured in the soundtrack for the 2015 video game FIFA 16.

== Track listing ==
Digital download / CD
No.	Title	Writer(s)	Length
1.	"Crystals"	Nanna Bryndís Hilmarsdóttir; Ragnar Þórhallsson; Arnar Rósenkranz Hilmarsson	4:02

== Music video ==
A music video was released on 11 May 2015. the video features Nanna Bryndís Hilmarsdóttir dressed as a gypsy wearing beads on her eyes. The video takes place in a warehouse where the band members are dressed as workers and Nanna is seen helping them create a monster. As the video goes, she and the members put strange things in a machine and the video ends with them successfully creating what appears to be a girlish creature with crystal eyes.

== Lyric video ==
A lyric video was released on 16 March 2015, featuring Icelandic actor Siggi Sigurjóns.

== Charts ==
=== Weekly charts ===
Weekly chart performance for "Crystals"
Chart (2015)	Peak position
Australia (ARIA)	94
Canada Hot 100 (Billboard)	84
Canada Rock (Billboard)	6
Switzerland Airplay (Schweizer Hitparade)	58
US Hot Rock & Alternative Songs (Billboard)	12
US Rock & Alternative Airplay (Billboard)	6

=== Year-end charts ===
Year-end chart performance for "Crystals"
Chart (2015)	Position
US Hot Rock Songs (Billboard)	41
US Rock Airplay (Billboard)	23

== Certifications ==
Certifications for "Crystals"
Region	Certification	Certified units/sales
Brazil (Pro-Música Brasil)	Gold	30,000^{‡}
^{‡} Sales+streaming figures based on certification alone.
