= Octavia (band) =

- Origin: La Paz, Bolivia
- Genres: Rock, rock en español
- Years active: 1988–1996 (Coda 3) 1996– Present
- Labels: Discolandia, Columbia/Sony Music, Dedos Records, Flagstone Records
- Members: Simón Lujan; Vladimir Pérez; Omar González; Martín Fox

Octavia is a Bolivian pop rock band characterized by a unique mix of Andean music, catchy pop sounds, use of electronic synthesizers, and acoustic music. The band's sound is continually evolving but it is widely regarded as one of the most important and influential bands in the history of Bolivian rock.

== Beginnings ==
Started in La Paz, Bolivia, in 1988, the band comprises:

Simón Lujan, Vladimir Pérez, Omar González, Martín Fox

The first name of the band was "Coda 3" and under this name they recorded four albums of their own compositions with independent record companies in Bolivia.

In 1995 the band's music became known outside Bolivia when its songs were aired by the most important music broadcast those days, MTV Latinoamérica. This opened the possibilities for international record companies to include the band's name on their lists, their name.

== International appearance ==
In 1996 the band signed a three-album deal with Sony Music Entertainment. To avoid being confused with a Mexican band by the name of Coda, they changed their name to Octavia.

The first of these albums was "aura" in 1996, an album which later became an icon for the Bolivian market, with record sales and a platinum disc. Three more albums were created under this contract.

Some of the band's music videos were broadcast on well known music channels such as MTVla, Telehit and Ritmoson Latino.

All these productions went Gold or Platinum, which motivated the band to tour the United States of America in 1998 in locations such as:Miami, Washington, Virginia, Maryland and New York.

In the year 2000, the band was invited to one of the most important music festivals in Latin America, “Rock al Parque” (rock to the park), in Bogotá, Colombia, where they played 2 shows for more than 50,000 viewers. This participation was highlighted in a special report covered by CNN en Español.

The following years, Octavia toured Chile and Peru and extended their contract with Sony Music Entertainment to produce the album “4”. Initially slated to be released in Argentina, Chile, Peru, Bolivia and Ecuador, the economic crisis in Argentina obliterates the economic movement of Sony in Bolivia, and nearby countries. Consequently, the new material was not distributed.

Octavia terminated their contract with Sony and in 2003 independently produced the album “Octavia al Aire libre” (Octavia in Open Air), their first live album featuring their greatest hits from 15 years of work.

In 2004 Octavia spent 6 months in Oklahoma, USA and cut a new album called “Talismán”. The album was produced by Tyson Meade - chief of “Chainsaw Kittens” - under Flagstone Records.

On 2005 the band promoted the album “Talismán” all over Bolivia, performing a series of notable concerts such as their appearance in Paceña's FestiMusic in Santa Cruz and La Paz, along with bands such as Ataque 77 (Argentina) and Kumbia Kings (USA). In the first months of 2006 the band planned the release of “Talisman” in Argentina.

In December 2006 Octavia released a five-song EP called "Masterplan" to fulfill the Bolivian audience's demand for new material after "Talisman".

The band also worked with the Bolivian Beer company "Paceña" to create and release the single "Paceña's theme" as an official song for the brand.

== Discography ==
- "Dia Tras Día" - 1990 - Pro Audio SRL (as Coda 3)
- "Verdades Inéditas" - 1992 (Gold) - Discolandia MCB (as Coda 3)
- "2387" - 1994 (Gold) - Discolandia MCB (as Coda 3)
- "Para Salir Del Molde - Acústico" - 1995 - Discolandia MCB (as Coda 3)
- "Aura" - 1996 (Platinum) - Sony Music
- "Ciclos" - 1998 (Gold) - Sony Music
- "Octavia Acústico" - 2001 (Gold) - Sony Music
- "4" - 2002 (Gold) - Sony Music
- "Octavia Al Aire Libre" - 2003 - Dedos Records
- "Coda 3 1990-1995 (Compilation)" - 2004 - Discolandia MCB (as Coda 3)
- "Talisman (Versión En Español)" - 2004 - Flagstone Records
- "Talisman (English Version)" - 2004 - Flagstone Records
- "Masterplan EP" - 2006 - Flagstone Records
- "Medular" - 2009 - Dedos Records
- "Superluz" - 2014 - Dedos Records
- "8via Sinfonia" - 2018 - Dedos Records
- "La Teoría del Pistolero Solitario" - 2020 - Musi Tech Records

== Videos ==
- Verdades Ineditas
- Después de ti
- Ven
- Si mañana
- Ajayu
- Redención
- Discolipstick
- La Noche
- Phutu & Bass
- Ripiados
- Aterrizame
- Lentamente
- Sintonizate
