= Sun of Jamaica (album) =

Studio album by Goombay Dance Band
- Released: 1980
- Recorded: 1979–1980
- Genre: Euro disco
- Label: CBS
- Producer: Ernest Clinton, Jochen Petersen

Goombay Dance Band chronology
Sun of Jamaica (1980)	Land of Gold (1980)

Sun of Jamaica, also known as Zauber der Karibik (English: Magic of the Caribbean), is the debut studio album by the German group Goombay Dance Band, released in 1980 by CBS Records.

The album achieved commercial success across Europe, including number 1 position in Austria. It spawned two major hits: "Sun of Jamaica" and "Aloha-Oe, Until We Meet Again".

== Track listing ==
Side A

1. "Goombay Dance" – 4:00
2. "Sing Little Children (Bon Soir Dame)" – 2:40
3. "Aloha-Oe, Until We Meet Again" – 3:45
4. "Monkey" – 3:03
5. "Caribbean Girl" – 3:42
6. "Fly Flamingo" – 4:00

Side B

1. "Sun of Jamaica" – 4:22
2. "Bang Bang Lulu" – 2:27
3. "Paradise of Joy" – 3:50
4. "Conga Man" – 3:33
5. "Island of Dreams" – 3:26
6. "Take Me Home to Jamaica" – 2:48

== Chart performance ==
Chart (1980)	Peak position
Austrian Albums Chart	1
Dutch Albums Chart	4
German Albums Chart	3
Norwegian Albums Chart	17
Swedish Albums Chart	15

== Sales and certifications ==
Certifications for Sun of Jamaica
Region	Certification	Certified units/sales
Netherlands (NVPI)	Platinum	100,000^{^}
Poland	—	327,000
^{^} Shipments figures based on certification alone.
