= Emmerson (musician) =

Sierra Leonean Afropop singer

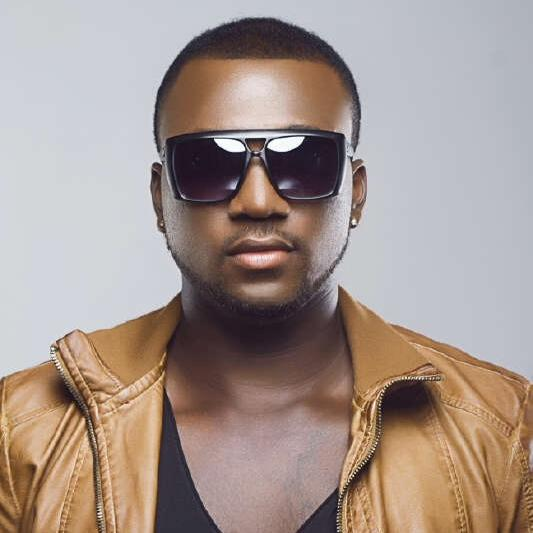

Background information
- Born: Emmerson Amidu Bockarie; December 23, 1980 (age 45); Freetown, Sierra Leone
- Genres: R&B; Afro pop
- Occupations: Singer; songwriter; actor; activist
- Years active: 2002–present
- Label: Sugar Entertainment
- Website: myemmerson.net

Emmerson Amidu Bockarie (born December 23, 1980), better known as Emmerson, is a Sierra Leonean Afropop singer and songwriter. His songs advocate social change, and he has gained recognition in his native Sierra Leone for his political themes that center on the corruption in the government. Emmerson sings in Krio and English.

== Life and career ==
Bockarie was born in Kenema, Sierra Leone. He dropped out of a computer engineering program at Njala University to pursue a career in music. His first musical release was a mixtape called Bodyguard Compilation, Volume One (2002), which contained the single "Yu Go See Am". Velma "Vee" Richards provided vocals for his debut studio album, Borbor Bele, which was released in October 2004. The album's main topics of discussion were kleptocratic institutions and the ideologies and cultures that support them. The title track "Borbor Bele", which translates to "Potbellied Boy", is one of Emmerson's anti-corruption protest songs that expressed the anger and disenchantment Sierra Leoneans felt toward their rulers and leaders. "Borbor Bele" spoke about many of the reasons as to why the incumbent Sierra Leone People's Party should lose to the All People's Congress in the 2007 Sierra Leonean general election.

Emmerson's later albums include 2 Fut Arata (2007), Yesterday Betteh Pass Tiday (2010), Rise (2012), Kokobeh (2013), Home and Away (2014), and Survivor (2016). In May 2017, he released the single "Love Me". Among his previous singles are "Telescope" (2015) and "Tutu Party".

== Discography ==
Studio albums

- Borbor Bele (2004)
- 2 Fut Arata (2007)
- Yesterday Betteh Pass Tiday (2010)
- Rise (2012)
- Kokobeh (2013)
- Home and Away (2014)
- Survivor (2016)

== See also ==
- African popular music
- Fela Kuti
- Michel Martelly
- Opposition (politics)
