= Dirty Paws =

Single by Of Monsters and Men

from the album My Head Is an Animal
- Released: 12 April 2012
- Recorded: 2011–12
- Genre: Indie folk; indie pop
- Length: 4:38
- Label: Universal
- Songwriters: Nanna Bryndís Hilmarsdóttir; Ragnar Þórhallsson
- Producers: Of Monsters and Men; Aron Arnarsson

Of Monsters and Men singles chronology
"Little Talks" (2011)	"Dirty Paws" (2012)	"Mountain Sound" (2012)

Lyric video
- "Dirty Paws" on YouTube

"Dirty Paws" is a song written and recorded by Icelandic band Of Monsters and Men for their debut studio album, My Head Is an Animal (2011). It is the opening track and the title of the album comes from a line in the song, and was released as its second single in April 2012 in the United Kingdom, Ireland and Europe. The lyrics describe a war among animals, launched by the bees against the birds, but won by an alliance of animals against them.

It was featured in the trailer and soundtrack to The Secret Life of Walter Mitty. In 2021, it was also featured in the first episode of Sweet Tooth.

== Lyric video ==
A lyric video to the song was released in 2014. The video features a large two-legged creature carrying a flag through an Icelandic mountainscape, with squadrons of phoenix-like birds flying in the sky.

== Track listing ==
CD / digital download
No.	Title	Writer(s)	Length
1.	"Dirty Paws"	Nanna Bryndís Hilmarsdóttir; Ragnar Þórhallsson	4:38

== Charts ==
=== Weekly charts ===
Weekly chart performance for "Dirty Paws"
Chart (2012–2014)	Peak position
Canada Rock (Billboard)	19
New Zealand (Recorded Music NZ)	35
Switzerland (Schweizer Hitparade)	75
US Hot Rock & Alternative Songs (Billboard)	24
US Rock & Alternative Airplay (Billboard)	25

=== Year-end charts ===
Year-end chart performance for "Dirty Paws"
Chart (2014)	Position
US Hot Rock Songs (Billboard)	98

== Certifications ==
Certifications for "Dirty Paws"
Region	Certification	Certified units/sales
Brazil (Pro-Música Brasil)	Platinum	60,000^{‡}
New Zealand (RMNZ)	Platinum	30,000^{‡}
United Kingdom (BPI)	Gold	400,000^{‡}
United States (RIAA)	Platinum	1,000,000^{‡}
^{‡} Sales+streaming figures based on certification alone.
