= Little Talks =

2011 debut single by Of Monsters and Men

Single by Of Monsters and Men

from the album My Head Is an Animal
- Released: 20 December 2011
- Genre: Stomp and holler
- Length: 4:26 (album version); 4:12 (radio edit)
- Label: Universal Republic
- Songwriters: Nanna Bryndís Hilmarsdóttir; Ragnar Þórhallsson
- Producers: Of Monsters and Men; Aron Þór Arnarsson

Of Monsters and Men singles chronology
| "Little Talks" (2011) | "Dirty Paws" (2012) |

Music video
- "Little Talks" on YouTube

"Little Talks" is the debut single by Icelandic indie rock band Of Monsters and Men. The song was released as the lead single from their debut studio album, My Head Is an Animal (2011). It was also released on the band's EP Into the Woods. It was written by primary vocalists Nanna Bryndís Hilmarsdóttir and Ragnar Þórhallsson, and produced by Aron Þór Arnarsson.

== Background and content ==
According to Nanna Bryndís Hilmarsdóttir, the song describes two loving people talking past each other and implies one is deceased, saying "maybe one person isn't really hearing the other one." The song was inspired by an old house she moved into.

== Critical reception ==
"Little Talks" received critical acclaim. USA Today described the song as a "monster hit", noting its "galloping chorus" and "reverb-heavy production". PBS Arts described the song's "rolling, infectious energy" and foreboding lyrics.

== Commercial performance ==
In August 2011, Philadelphia's Radio 104.5 began playing "Little Talks" and propelled the band to nationwide popularity in the United States. It had sold over 2 million copies in the US as of March 2013.

"Little Talks" reached number 12 in the UK charts and re-entered the UK Top 40 in 2013. In Ireland, the song debuted at number 28 on 26 July 2012 and reached the number-one spot on 16 August, spending two weeks at the top position. The song has peaked at number 20 on the Billboard Hot 100 chart, becoming their first top 20 single in the US. The song holds the record for the longest climb to reach the top 40 of the chart with 30 weeks. "Little Talks" is also the highest-charting single to date on that chart by an Icelandic artist. On 21 July 2012, it topped the Alternative Songs list and remained for a second week, and ultimately ranked as the third most successful song on the year end list. "Little Talks" was later certified Platinum in the United States, becoming their first song to do so. The song was listed for 48 weeks. In Australia, where the song reached number 7, the song reached number 2 in Triple J's Hottest 100 of 2012 on 26 January 2013. Elsewhere, the single reached the top 10 in New Zealand and several European countries, including Austria, Flemish Belgium, Germany, and Italy.

== Music video ==
The music video was released to the public via YouTube on 2 February 2012.

It starts with five sky-sailors (played by the male members of the band) spotting something falling from the sky. When they investigate, the object splits open to reveal a beautiful female creature (played by the band's lead singer Nanna Bryndis Hilmarsdóttir). She joins the sailors on their sky ship, but they are attacked by an enormous two-headed bird. The lady magically vanquishes the bird, but the ship is wrecked, forcing the sailors and the lady to continue on foot into a cave. When they emerge, they are confronted by another beast, which is once again defeated by the lady. They push onwards, but as they are crossing a frozen body of water, the ice breaks, plunging them into the frigid depths and into the clutches of a sea monster. The lady dispatches the monster, and they use a floating iceberg to ascend into the skies, where they are met by an enormous animal clad in the same colors as the female creature, who smiles and rejoins her people as the song ends.

The video was created and directed by the production firm WeWereMonkeys who also produced and directed the video for the band's 2013 single "King and Lionheart". The music video was nominated in the 2012 MTV Video Music Awards for Best Art Direction in a Video but lost to Katy Perry's "Wide Awake". A lyric video was released in 2014 in the presence of the video. The video features the sailors in their sky ship with the woman following behind them.

== Charts ==
=== Weekly charts ===
Weekly chart performance for "Little Talks"
| Chart (2011–2014) | Peak position |
|---|---|
| Australia (ARIA) | 7 |
| Austria (Ö3 Austria Top 40) | 9 |
| Belgium (Ultratop 50 Flanders) | 3 |
| Belgium (Ultratop 50 Wallonia) | 11 |
| Canada Hot 100 (Billboard) | 55 |
| Canada CHR/Top 40 (Billboard) | 37 |
| Canada Hot AC (Billboard) | 33 |
| Canada Rock (Billboard) | 13 |
| Czech Republic Airplay (ČNS IFPI) | 2 |
| Czech Republic Singles Digital (ČNS IFPI) | 63 |
| Europe (Euro Digital Songs) | 9 |
| France (SNEP) | 29 |
| Germany (GfK) | 5 |
| Hungary (Editors' Choice Top 40) | 19 |
| Iceland (Tonlist) | 1 |
| Ireland (IRMA) | 1 |
| Italy (FIMI) | 3 |
| Japan Hot 100 (Billboard) | 72 |
| Luxembourg Digital Songs (Billboard) | 6 |
| Mexico Ingles Airplay (Billboard) | 1 |
| Mexico Airplay (Billboard) | 43 |
| Netherlands (Dutch Top 40) | 16 |
| Netherlands (Single Top 100) | 18 |
| New Zealand (Recorded Music NZ) | 4 |
| Poland Airplay (ZPAV) | 4 |
| Scottish Singles Sales (Official Charts) | 12 |
| Slovakia Airplay (ČNS IFPI) | 6 |
| Spain (Promusicae) | 25 |
| Sweden (Sverigetopplistan) | 21 |
| Switzerland (Schweizer Hitparade) | 24 |
| UK Singles (Official Charts) | 12 |
| US Billboard Hot 100 | 20 |
| US Adult Contemporary (Billboard) | 20 |
| US Adult Pop Airplay (Billboard) | 6 |
| US Hot Rock & Alternative Songs (Billboard) | 3 |
| US Pop Airplay (Billboard) | 18 |
| Venezuela Top 200 (Record Report) | 108 |

=== Year-end charts ===
2011 year-end chart performance for "Little Talks"
| Chart (2011) | Position |
|---|---|
| Iceland (Tonlist) | 1 |

2012 year-end chart performance for "Little Talks"
| Chart (2012) | Position |
|---|---|
| Australia (ARIA) | 38 |
| Austria (Ö3 Austria Top 40) | 35 |
| Belgium (Ultratop 50 Flanders) | 11 |
| Belgium (Ultratop 50 Wallonia) | 44 |
| Germany (Official German Charts) | 13 |
| Ireland (IRMA) | 17 |
| Italy (FIMI) | 30 |
| Netherlands (Dutch Top 40) | 58 |
| Netherlands (Single Top 100) | 46 |
| Poland (ZPAV) | 49 |
| Switzerland (Schweizer Hitparade) | 57 |
| UK Singles (Official Charts Company) | 109 |
| US Hot Rock Songs (Billboard) | 7 |
| US On-Demand Songs (Billboard) | 22 |

2013 year-end chart performance for "Little Talks"
| Chart (2013) | Position |
|---|---|
| Australia (ARIA) | 53 |
| New Zealand (Recorded Music NZ) | 38 |
| Spain (PROMUSICAE) | 44 |
| Sweden (Sverigetopplistan) | 74 |
| UK Singles (Official Charts Company) | 106 |
| US Billboard Hot 100 | 65 |
| US Adult Top 40 (Billboard) | 24 |
| US Hot Rock Songs (Billboard) | 13 |
| US Rock Airplay (Billboard) | 40 |

=== Decade-end charts ===
2010s-end chart performance for "Little Talks"
| Chart (2010–2019) | Position |
|---|---|
| US Hot Rock Songs (Billboard) | 38 |
| Triple J Hottest 100 of the Decade | 30 |

== Certifications ==
Certifications and sales for "Little Talks"
| Region | Certification | Certified units/sales |
|---|---|---|
| Australia (ARIA) | 6× Platinum | 420,000^{^} |
| Austria (IFPI Austria) | Gold | 15,000^{*} |
| Belgium (BRMA) | Platinum | 30,000^{*} |
| Brazil (Pro-Música Brasil) | 2× Platinum | 120,000^{‡} |
| Canada (Music Canada) | 3× Platinum | 240,000^{*} |
| Denmark (IFPI Danmark) | Platinum | 90,000^{‡} |
| Germany (BVMI) | 3× Gold | 450,000^{^} |
| Italy (FIMI) | 2× Platinum | 60,000^{‡} |
| New Zealand (RMNZ) | 5× Platinum | 150,000^{‡} |
| Spain (Promusicae) | Platinum | 60,000^{‡} |
| Sweden (GLF) | 2× Platinum | 80,000^{‡} |
| Switzerland (IFPI Switzerland) | Gold | 15,000^{^} |
| United Kingdom (BPI) | 4× Platinum | 2,400,000^{‡} |
| United States (RIAA) | 7× Platinum | 7,000,000^{‡} |
Streaming
| Denmark (IFPI Danmark) | Gold | 900,000^{†} |
| Spain (Promusicae) | Gold | 4,000,000^{†} |
^{*} Sales figures based on certification alone.^{^} Shipments figures based on certification alone.^{‡} Sales+streaming figures based on certification alone.^{†} Streaming-only figures based on certification alone.

== Release history ==
Release dates and formats for "Little Talks"
| Region | Date | Format | Label(s) | Ref. |
|---|---|---|---|---|
| United States | 23 October 2012 | Mainstream airplay | Republic | |

== In popular culture ==
In 2013, YouTube star Kurt Hugo Schneider and Coca-Cola collaborated to create music videos featuring creative covers of two 2011 hits namely "Little Talks" and Calvin Harris' "Feel So Close" for a campaign called "The Sounds of AHH". "Little Talks" shows Schneider playing only Coca-Cola bottles, glasses and cans. Featured in the version are the vocals of Kevin Olusola. Commercial edits of the video aired on season 13 premiere of American Idol on 14 January 2014 on FOX.
