= Mountain Sound =

2012 single by Of Monsters and Men

Single by Of Monsters and Men

from the album My Head Is an Animal (international version)
- Released: 2 September 2012
- Recorded: 2011
- Genre: Indie folk; indie pop; baroque pop
- Length: 3:31
- Label: Republic
- Songwriters: Nanna Bryndís Hilmarsdóttir; Ragnar Þórhallsson; Arnar Rósenkranz Hilmarsson
- Producer: Jacquire King

Of Monsters and Men singles chronology
"Dirty Paws" (2012)	"Mountain Sound" (2012)	"King and Lionheart" (2013)

Music video
- "Mountain Sound" on YouTube

"Mountain Sound" is a single by Icelandic indie folk and indie pop band Of Monsters and Men. The song was released as the second single from the international version of their debut studio album, My Head Is an Animal (2011). It was written by band members Nanna Bryndís Hilmarsdóttir, Ragnar Þórhallsson and Arnar Rósenkranz Hilmarsson, and produced by Jacquire King.

The song was commercially successful in North America, peaking at no. 14 on the Billboard weekly Hot Rock Songs chart and no. 24 on the year-end Hot Rock Songs chart in 2013 in the U.S. and no. 9 on the Billboard Canada rock chart. Critical reception was also positive.

== Composition ==
Arnar Rósenkranz Hilmarsson, Nanna Bryndís Hilmarsdóttir and Ragnar Þórhallsson collaboratively composed both the music and lyrics. "Mountain Sound" is in a 2/2 time signature in E major, with a vocal range from C#4 to C#5. Bryndís and Þórhallsson share vocal leads.

== Music video ==
The music video for "Mountain Sound" was filmed on location at a festival held at the Hljomskalagardurinn park in Reykjavík, Iceland, on 7 July 2012. The band was filmed while performing at the festival. The video was first released onto YouTube on 13 September 2012.

== Reception ==
=== Chart performance ===
In the UK, "Mountain Sound" debuted on the UK Singles Chart at no. 66 on 10 November 2012, declining to no. 81 the following week and exiting afterwards. In the US, "Mountain Sound" debuted on the Billboard magazine Hot Rock Songs chart on 6 October 2012 and charted there for 52 weeks, peaking at no. 13 on 5 January 2013.

=== Critical reception ===
"Mountain Sound" received positive reviews. Matt Collar of allmusic praised "Mountain Sound" as "catchy" and found it similar to Florence and the Machine. Rolling Stone called the song "upbeat, barreling". Reviewing the My Head Is an Animal album, Hilary Saunders of Paste Magazine cited "Mountain Sound" as an example of quality vocal leads by Bryndís and Þórhallsson. Oran Mor of The Guardian commented that the song "crafts a memorable chorus out of the very English-sounding line 'Hold your horses now'."

== Use in media ==
The song was used in the trailer of Alexander and the Terrible, Horrible, No Good, Very Bad Day. It can be heard in a bar in the fourth episode of the first season of Gang Related, "Perros". It is also included as a playable song in Guitar Hero Live and as DLC for Rock Band 4.

== Charts ==
=== Weekly charts ===
Chart (2012–2013)	Peak position
Australia (ARIA)	29
Belgium (Ultratip Bubbling Under Flanders)	3
Canada Hot 100 (Billboard)	69
Canada Rock (Billboard)	9
Ireland (IRMA)	28
New Zealand (Recorded Music NZ)	22
Scottish Singles Sales (Official Charts)	49
Switzerland Airplay (Schweizer Hitparade)	90
UK Singles (Official Charts)	66
US Bubbling Under Hot 100 (Billboard)	3
US Adult Pop Airplay (Billboard)	25
US Hot Rock & Alternative Songs (Billboard)	14
US Rock & Alternative Airplay (Billboard)	2

=== Year-end charts ===
Chart (2013)	Position
US Hot Rock Songs (Billboard)	24
US Rock Airplay (Billboard)	5

== Certifications ==
Region	Certification	Certified units/sales
Australia (ARIA)	Platinum	70,000^{^}
Brazil (Pro-Música Brasil)	Gold	30,000^{‡}
Canada (Music Canada)	Gold	40,000^{*}
New Zealand (RMNZ)	Platinum	15,000^{*}
United Kingdom (BPI)	Silver	200,000^{‡}
United States (RIAA)	Platinum	1,000,000^{‡}
^{*} Sales figures based on certification alone.^{^} Shipments figures based on certification alone.^{‡} Sales+streaming figures based on certification alone.
