= My Head Is an Animal =

Studio album by Of Monsters and Men
- Released: 20 September 2011 (In Iceland)
- Recorded: 26–28 March 2011; 9–25 January 2012
- Studios: Studio Syrland, Vatnagarðar, Reykjavík
- Genres: Indie folk; indie pop; indie rock
- Length: 59:38
- Labels: Record, Republic
- Producers: Of Monsters and Men, Aron Arnarsson, Jacquire King

Of Monsters and Men chronology
My Head Is an Animal (2011)	Live from Vatnagarðar (2013)

Icelandic release

Singles from My Head Is an Animal
- 1. "Little Talks" Released: 20 December 2011; 2. "Dirty Paws" Released: 12 April 2012; 3. "Mountain Sound" Released: 2 September 2012; 4. "King and Lionheart" Released: 3 March 2013

My Head Is an Animal is the debut studio album by the Icelandic indie rock band Of Monsters and Men, released through Record Records in Iceland on 20 September 2011. After their success, topping the Icelandic charts with their debut single, "Little Talks", the band signed with Universal Music Group and the album was released internationally through Republic Records on 3 April 2012. The title of the album comes from the second line in "Dirty Paws".

== Cover art ==
The front of the international release is a photograph that Brynjar's grandfather took of his friend. The original was black and white; Arnar Hilmarsson added the coloring. The back is a family photograph that Ragnar found in his family pictures.

The pictures on the front and back of the Icelandic release depict men dressed for the Icelandic national sport of Glima.

== Release and promotion ==
=== Singles ===
"Little Talks" was released as the debut single by the band, and the lead single from My Head Is an Animal on 20 December 2011, after it had been released as a promo to radio stations in the US and Europe in July 2011. The single propelled the band to nationwide popularity in the US, and has so far sold a million copies there. The success of the single in the US led to the band's signing with Universal Music Group, and the single, along with a revised version of My Head Is an Animal was released in North America on 3 April 2012. The music video for the song debuted in February 2012.

"Dirty Paws" served as the second single from My Head Is an Animal in the UK and Ireland. It was released on 12 April 2012, in the lead up to the album's re-release in Europe. A promotional single followed in June.

"Six Weeks" was released as a promotional single from the album in the UK and Ireland. It was released as a digital download on 27 August 2012.

"Mountain Sound" was released in the US as the second single from the album, and the fourth overall. Seeing a release worldwide as the follow-up to "Little Talks" as well, it was released on 2 September 2012. A music video to accompany the single was released on 24 September.

== Reception ==
=== Critical reception ===
Professional ratings
Aggregate scores
Source	Rating
Metacritic	66/100
Review scores
Source	Rating
AllMusic	3.5/5 stars
Beats Per Minute	81%
Paste	7.5/10 stars
Rolling Stone	3/5 stars
Sputnikmusic	4/5 stars

The album received positive reviews from music critics. On Metacritic it currently holds a rating of 66/100, signifying generally favourable reviews.

=== Commercial performance ===
The album debuted in the United States at number six on the Billboard 200, selling 55,000 units in its first week alone. This marked the best chart performance for an Icelandic musical artist in U.S. history. The previous chart record was held by Björk's Volta, which peaked at number nine on the Billboard 200 in 2009. In January 2014, the band announced via Facebook that the album had achieved platinum certification in the United States. As of June 2015, the album has sold 1.1 million copies in the US.

== Track listing ==
All songs are credited to Of Monsters and Men, but were actually written by the band's individuals and/or others. The actual writers are listed alongside the tracks.

Original Iceland release
No.	Title	Writer(s)	Length
1.	"Dirty Paws"	Nanna Bryndís Hilmarsdóttir, Ragnar Þórhallsson	4:26
2.	"King and Lionheart"	Nanna	4:35
3.	"Numb Bears"	Ragnar, Arnar Rósenkranz Hilmarsson	2:45
4.	"Sloom"	Nanna, Ragnar, Arnar	4:42
5.	"Little Talks"	Nanna, Ragnar	4:24
6.	"From Finner"	Nanna, Ragnar, Arnar, Brynjar Leifsson	3:41
7.	"Six Weeks"	Ragnar, Arnar	5:32
8.	"Love Love Love"	Nanna	4:02
9.	"Your Bones"	Ragnar	4:07
10.	"Lakehouse"	Nanna, Ragnar, Brynjar	5:42
11.	"Yellow Light" (ends at 4:52; hidden song "Sinking Man" starts at 13:04)	Ragnar	15:45
Total length:			59:38

Universal Music Group re-issue
No.	Title	Writer(s)	Length
1.	"Dirty Paws"		4:38
2.	"King and Lionheart"		4:33
3.	"Mountain Sound"	Nanna, Ragnar, Arnar	3:35
4.	"Slow and Steady"	Nanna, Ragnar, Arnar, Brynjar, Árni Guðjónsson, Kristján Páll Kristjánsson	5:01
5.	"From Finner"		3:43
6.	"Little Talks"		4:26
7.	"Six Weeks"		5:34
8.	"Love Love Love"		3:58
9.	"Your Bones"		4:09
10.	"Sloom"		4:43
11.	"Lakehouse"		4:35
12.	"Yellow Light"		4:52
Total length:			53:47

Universal Music Group re-issue; iTunes bonus tracks
No.	Title	Length
13.	"Numb Bears"	2:44
14.	"Little Talks" (music video)	4:11
Total length:		60:42

10th anniversary edition
No.	Title	Writer(s)	Length
1.	"Dirty Paws"		4:38
2.	"King and Lionheart" (2011 Iceland release version)		4:44
3.	"Numb Bears" (2011 Iceland release version)		2:45
4.	"Sloom"		4:44
5.	"Little Talks"		4:26
6.	"From Finner"		3:42
7.	"Six Weeks"		5:32
8.	"Love Love Love"		3:57
9.	"Your Bones"		4:07
10.	"Lakehouse" (2011 Iceland release version)		5:56
11.	"Yellow Light"		4:53
12.	"Sinking Man" (2011 Iceland release version)	Nanna, Ragnar	2:49
13.	"Phantom"	Nanna, Ragnar	4:42
14.	"Sugar in a Bowl"	Nanna, Ragnar	2:48
Total length:			59:50

== Personnel ==
Of Monsters and Men

- Nanna Bryndís Hilmarsdóttir – vocals, acoustic guitar
- Ragnar Þórhallsson – vocals, acoustic guitar
- Brynjar Leifsson – electric and baritone guitar
- Kristján Páll Kristjánsson – bass guitar
- Arnar Rósenkranz Hilmarsson – drums, percussion
- Árni Guðjónsson – accordion, piano, organ

Additional musicians

- Ari Bragi Kárason – trumpet
- Ragnhildur Gunnarsdóttir – trumpet
- Bergrún Snæbjörnsdóttir – French horn

Production (Icelandic release)

- Of Monsters and Men – producer on all tracks
- Aron Arnarsson – producer, engineer, mixing on all tracks
- Styrmir Hauksson – mastering
- Arnar Rósenkranz Hilmarsson – artwork, design
- Nanna Bryndís Hilmarsdóttir – artwork, design
- Ragnar Þórhallsson – artwork, design

Production (US release)

- Of Monsters and Men – producer on tracks 1, 2, 5, 6, 7, 8, 9, 10, 11, 12
- Aron Arnarsson – engineer, producer on tracks 1, 2, 5, 6, 7, 8, 9, 10, 12
- Jacquire King – producer on tracks 2, 3, 4, 11
- Craig Silvey – mixing
- Greg Calbi – mastering
- Arnar Rósenkranz Hilmarsson – artwork, design
- Ragnar Þórhallsson – artwork, design

== Charts ==
=== Weekly charts ===
Weekly chart performance for My Head Is an Animal
Chart (2011–2013)	Peak position
Australian Albums (ARIA)	1
Austrian Albums (Ö3 Austria)	17
Belgian Albums (Ultratop Flanders)	14
Belgian Albums (Ultratop Wallonia)	45
Canadian Albums (Billboard)	4
Danish Albums (Hitlisten)	36
Dutch Albums (Album Top 100)	5
French Albums (SNEP)	55
German Albums (Offizielle Top 100)	4
Icelandic Albums (Tonlist)	1
Irish Albums (IRMA)	1
Italian Albums (FIMI)	44
New Zealand Albums (RMNZ)	4
Norwegian Albums (VG-lista)	23
Scottish Albums (Official Charts)	4
Spanish Albums (Promusicae)	30
Swedish Albums (Sverigetopplistan)	43
Swiss Albums (Schweizer Hitparade)	29
UK Albums (Official Charts)	3
US Billboard 200	6
US Top Alternative Albums (Billboard)	1
US Top Rock Albums (Billboard)	1

=== Year-end charts ===
2012 year-end chart performance for My Head Is an Animal
Chart (2012)	Position
Australian Albums (ARIA)	55
Belgian Albums (Ultratop Flanders)	57
Canadian Albums (Billboard)	32
Dutch Albums (Album Top 100)	72
German Albums (Offizielle Top 100)	44
UK Albums (OCC)	88
US Billboard 200	56
US Top Rock Albums (Billboard)	12

2013 year-end chart performance for My Head Is an Animal
Chart (2013)	Position
Australian Albums (ARIA)	18
Canadian Albums (Billboard)	48
New Zealand Albums (RMNZ)	19
UK Albums (OCC)	91
US Billboard 200	48
US Top Rock Albums (Billboard)	9

2014 year-end chart performance for My Head Is an Animal
Chart (2014)	Position
US Top Rock Albums (Billboard)	54

2016 year-end chart performance for My Head Is an Animal
Chart (2016)	Position
Icelandic Albums (Plötutíóindi)	76

2018 year-end chart performance for My Head Is an Animal
Chart (2018)	Position
Icelandic Albums (Plötutíóindi)	90

=== Decade-end charts ===
Decade-end chart performance for My Head Is an Animal
Chart (2010–2019)	Position
Australian Albums (ARIA)	89
US Billboard 200	167

== Certifications and sales ==
Certifications and sales for My Head Is an Animal
Region	Certification	Certified units/sales
Australia (ARIA)	2× Platinum	140,000^{^}
Brazil (Pro-Música Brasil)	Platinum	40,000^{‡}
Canada (Music Canada)	2× Platinum	160,000^{^}
Denmark (IFPI Danmark)	Gold	10,000^{‡}
Germany (BVMI)	Platinum	200,000^{‡}
Iceland	—	27,000
Ireland (IRMA)	Gold	7,500^{^}
Italy (FIMI)	Gold	25,000^{‡}
New Zealand (RMNZ)	2× Platinum	30,000^{‡}
United Kingdom (BPI)	Platinum	270,347
United States (RIAA)	2× Platinum	2,000,000
^{^} Shipments figures based on certification alone.^{‡} Sales+streaming figures based on certification alone.
