= Cruks en Karnak =

- Origin: Quito
- Genres: Latin rock, fusion
- Years active: 1989–2008
- Labels: Sony Music and independent works nowadays
- Members: Sergio Sacoto Arias; Andrés Sacoto Arias; Pablo Santacruz; Pablo Estrella
- Website: CruksenKarnak.com

Cruks en Karnak was an Ecuadorian rock band formed in Quito, Ecuador in 1989.

== History ==
The members of the band were born and raised in a middle-class neighbourhood within Quito. In the beginning they tried to gain awareness and recognition in the music scene by performing at local pubs and bars. After gaining in popularity, their music became known throughout the country through heavy airplay.

The main feature of Los Cruks (as they are known in their country) is to have tried from the early beginnings to rescue the values of Ecuadorian nationalism. Their music mixes rock and a wide range of styles such as pop, Afro-Latin music, funk, Latin American folk music, and many others, achieving the sound for which they are known.

Los Cruks have taken their music across Latin America and the US, sharing the stage with important similar style artists, showing the quality of Ecuadorian music to a lot of different countries.

As the Germany World Cup 2006 took place, they were invited to perform various live shows through the European country where they earned respect from the public because of their original style.

The band broke up in 2007, after launching their final album in 2006, Antrologia.

== Formation ==
- Sergio Sacoto Arias
- Andrés Sacoto Arias
- Pablo Santacruz
- Pablo Estrella
- Esteban Rivadeneira

== Collaborators ==
- Ernesto Karolys (drums)
- Gino Castillo (percussion)

== Discography ==
- Tu Culpa (1993)
- Cruks en Karnak (1997)
- La dimensión del cuy (1999)
- Las desventuras de Cruks en Karnak (2003)
- 13 Gracias (2004)
- Antrología (2006)
