= Seven Tears (song) =

Single by Goombay Dance Band

from the album Holiday in Paradise
- Released: 1981
- Genre: Euro disco
- Length: 3:54
- Label: CBS; Epic
- Songwriters: Wolff-Ekkehardt Stein; Wolfgang Jass; Ian Cai Mercer
- Producer: Jochen Peterson

Goombay Dance Band singles chronology
"Rain" (1980)	"Seven Tears" (1981)	"Christmas at Sea" (1981)

"Seven Tears" is a song by the Goombay Dance Band, released in 1981. It was released as the only single from their third studio album, Holiday in Paradise, and was subsequently featured on the UK-only compilation Seven Tears.

Written by Wolff-Ekkehardt Stein and Wolfgang Jass, and produced by Jochen Peterson, "Seven Tears" was a major hit across Europe in the winter and spring of 1982. The song spent three weeks at number one on the UK Singles Chart, being the fourth time a German act had topped the UK chart, six weeks after Kraftwerk had achieved that feat with "The Model" in 1982 and Boney M with "Rivers of Babylon" and "Mary's Boy Child" in 1978.

== Track listings ==
7" vinyl single

Side one
No.	Title	Writer(s)	Length
1.	"Seven Tears"	Wolff-Ekkehardt Stein, Wolfgang Jass	3:54

Side two
No.	Title	Writer(s)	Length
1.	"Mama Coco"	Uve Schikora	3:30

12" vinyl single

Side one
No.	Title	Writer(s)	Length
1.	"Seven Tears" (Extended Dance Mix)	Stein-Jass	5:21

Side two
No.	Title	Writer(s)	Length
1.	"Mama Coco"	Schikora	3:30

== Charts ==
=== Weekly charts ===
Chart (1981–1982)	Peak position
Australia (Kent Music Report)	25
Austria (Ö3 Austria Top 40)	15
Belgium (Ultratop 50 Flanders)	6
Denmark (Hitlisten)	10
Netherlands (Dutch Top 40)	4
Netherlands (Single Top 100)	7
Ireland (IRMA)	1
New Zealand (Recorded Music NZ)	28
Spain (AFYVE)	18
UK Singles (Official Charts)	1
West Germany (GfK)	13

=== Year-end charts ===
Chart (1982)	Position
Belgium (Ultratop Flanders)	82
Netherlands (Dutch Top 40)	62
Netherlands (Single Top 100)	84

== Certifications ==
Region	Certification	Certified units/sales
United Kingdom (BPI)	Gold	500,000^{^}
^{^} Shipments figures based on certification alone.

== Cover versions ==
- French singer Séverine recorded a German version in 1981 named "Sieben Tränen".
- Dutch singer Arne Jansen recorded a Dutch version, named "Zeven brieven", which was a charting hit in 1982.
- The Swedish dansband Jigs recorded a Swedish version of the song in 1982, named "Hundra tårar".
- Croat singer Darko Domijan recorded a Croat version, named "Sedam suza".
