= Sun of Jamaica =

- Side A of the German vinyl

Single by Goombay Dance Band

from the album Sun of Jamaica
- B-side: "Island of Dreams"
- Released: December 1979
- Label: CBS
- Songwriters: Ekkehard Stein & Wolfgang Jass

Goombay Dance Band singles chronology
"Ring Ting Ting" (1979)	"Sun of Jamaica" (1979)	"Aloha-Oe, Until We Meet Again" (1980)

"Sun of Jamaica" is a song performed by German musical group Goombay Dance Band, written by Ekkehard Stein and Wolfgang Jass. The song was released at the end of 1979, and subsequently included on their debut album, Sun of Jamaica. The song was successful across Europe, reaching number one in West Germany and four other countries. Goombay Dance Band have re-recorded the track a number of times later in their career.

== Lyrics ==
The lyrics recount the narrator's desire to visit Jamaica after seeing Mutiny on the Bounty as a boy. He explicitly mentions Marlon Brando in the lyrics, thus referring to the 1962 film version. When he visits, he falls in love with a woman, and vows to later return to be with her.

== Track listings ==
- 7-inch single

A. "Sun of Jamaica" – 4:22
B. "Island of Dreams" – 3:26

== Charts ==
=== Weekly charts ===
Chart (1980–1982)	Peak position
Austria (Ö3 Austria Top 40)	1
Belgium (Joepie)	1
Belgium (Ultratop 50 Flanders)	1
France (SNEP)	38
Ireland (IRMA)	14
Netherlands (Dutch Top 40)	1
Netherlands (Single Top 100)	1
New Zealand (Recorded Music NZ)	19
Spain (AFE)	1
Sweden (Sverigetopplistan)	5
Switzerland (Schweizer Hitparade)	3
UK Singles (Official Charts)	50
West Germany (GfK)	1

=== Year-end charts ===
Chart (1980)	Position
Austria (Ö3 Austria Top 40)	1
Belgium (Ultratop)	7
Netherlands (Dutch Top 40)	8
Netherlands (Single Top 100)	3
Spain (AFE)	5
Switzerland (Schweizer Hitparade)	6
West Germany (Media Control)	1

== Certifications ==
Region	Certification	Certified units/sales
Germany (BVMI)	Platinum	1,000,000^{^}
^{^} Shipments figures based on certification alone.
