= Goombay Dance Band =

German band

- Origin: Hamburg, Germany
- Genres: Euro disco, Europop
- Years active: 1979–1986, 1995, 2009–2014, 2016–present
- Labels: CBS, Epic
- Members: Ernest Clinton; Oliver Bendt
- Past members: Beverlee Wallace; Wendy Walker; Wendy Doorsen "Dizzy" Daniel Moorehead; Mario Slijngaard; Alicia Bendt; Dorothy Hellings
- Website: www.goombay-dance-band.com

Goombay Dance Band is a German band created in 1979 by Oliver Bendt, named after a small bay on the Caribbean island of Saint Lucia. Their music (somewhat similar to Boney M.), is a mixture of soca, calypso and western pop. The group enjoyed their greatest commercial success at the beginning of the 1980s, with number one hits Sun of Jamaica, Seven Tears and Aloha-Oe, Until We Meet Again. Goombay Dance Band were popular in South Africa too, where Sun of Jamaica and Aloha-Oe entered the charts.

== History ==
The band released the song "Sun of Jamaica" at the end of 1979. It topped the German single charts for nine weeks in 1980. Their next single was "Aloha-Oe, Until We Meet Again", based on a Liliuokalani composition "Aloha ʻOe". The song reached the top 5 in the European charts, including the number 1 spot in Austria. The group's debut album Zauber der Karibik, internationally known as Sun of Jamaica, was met with commercial success, reaching the top 5 in several countries. The second album, Land of Gold, performed poorly, not reaching the German top 40, but spawned hits "Eldorado" and "Rain".

In 1981, the band released the album Holiday in Paradise, which featured the song "Seven Tears". When released in the UK next year, "Seven Tears" became the band's breakthrough hit on the British market, where it topped the singles chart for three weeks and was also a million-seller. This success was followed by the release of the compilation Seven Tears, which was well received in the UK, while in mainland Europe, the band released the retrospective Tropical Dreams to a modest success.

However, the group's subsequent releases did not draw as much attention. The next studio album, Born to Win, failed to chart and did not produce any impactful hits. In 1984 and 1985, Goombay Dance Band released several non-album singles, which were commercial failures. In late 1986, Goombay Dance Band later disbanded due to massive commercial decline in the mid-80s, they did not released any albums or singles until they reformed in 1995. In the 1990s, the band released several albums, including the Christmas Album and the compilation Island of Dreams, which was met with moderate chart success and featured a new version of "Sun of Jamaica". The band celebrated their 30th anniversary with a collection of new songs and re-recorded hits in 2009. The following year, they recorded "Is This the Way to the World Cup" to celebrate the 2010 FIFA World Cup. Oliver Bendt toured with the Goombay Dance Band until the end of 2016, when he retired shortly after his 70th birthday.

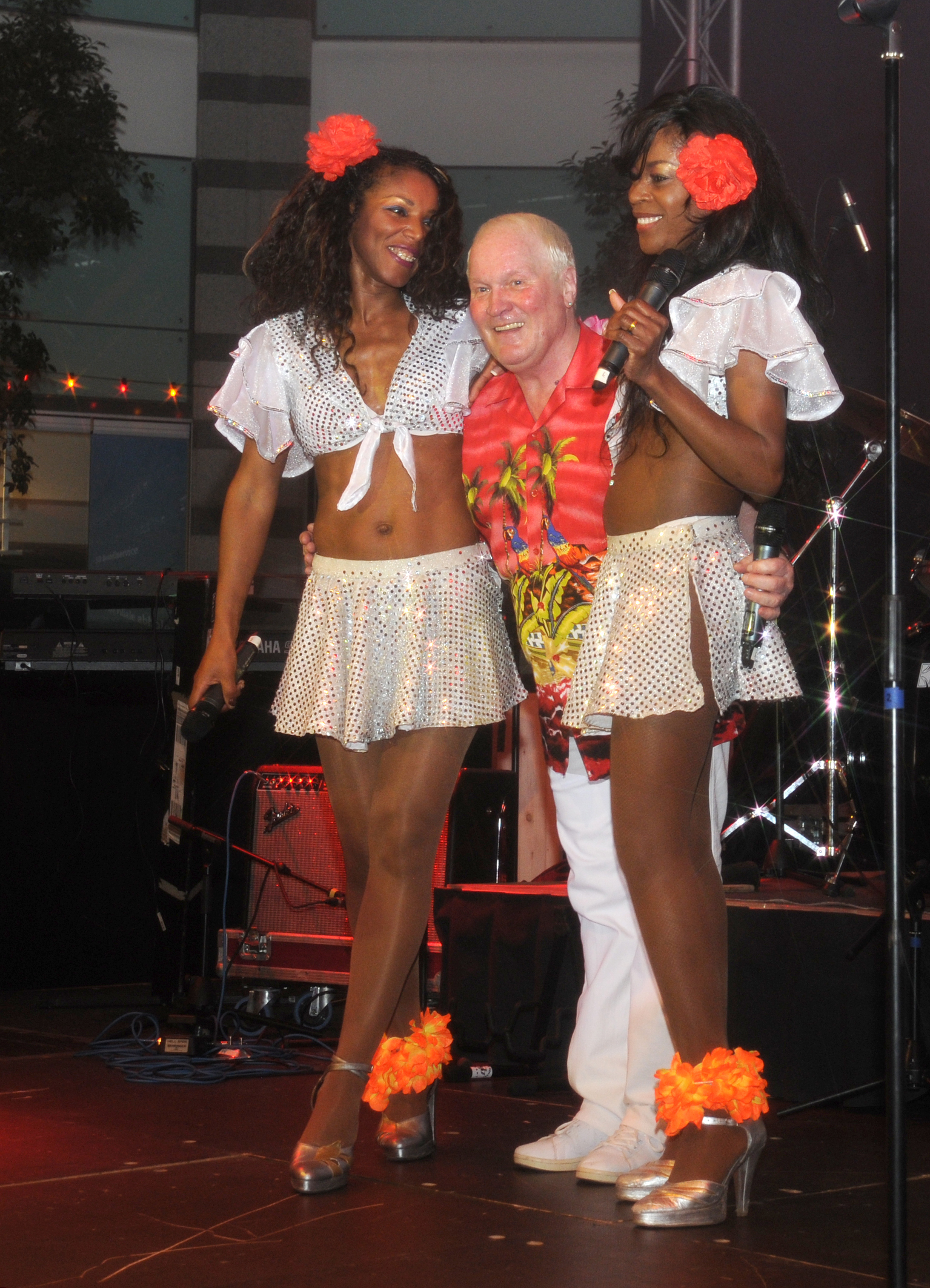
Goombay Dance Band feat. Oliver Bendt

== Band members ==
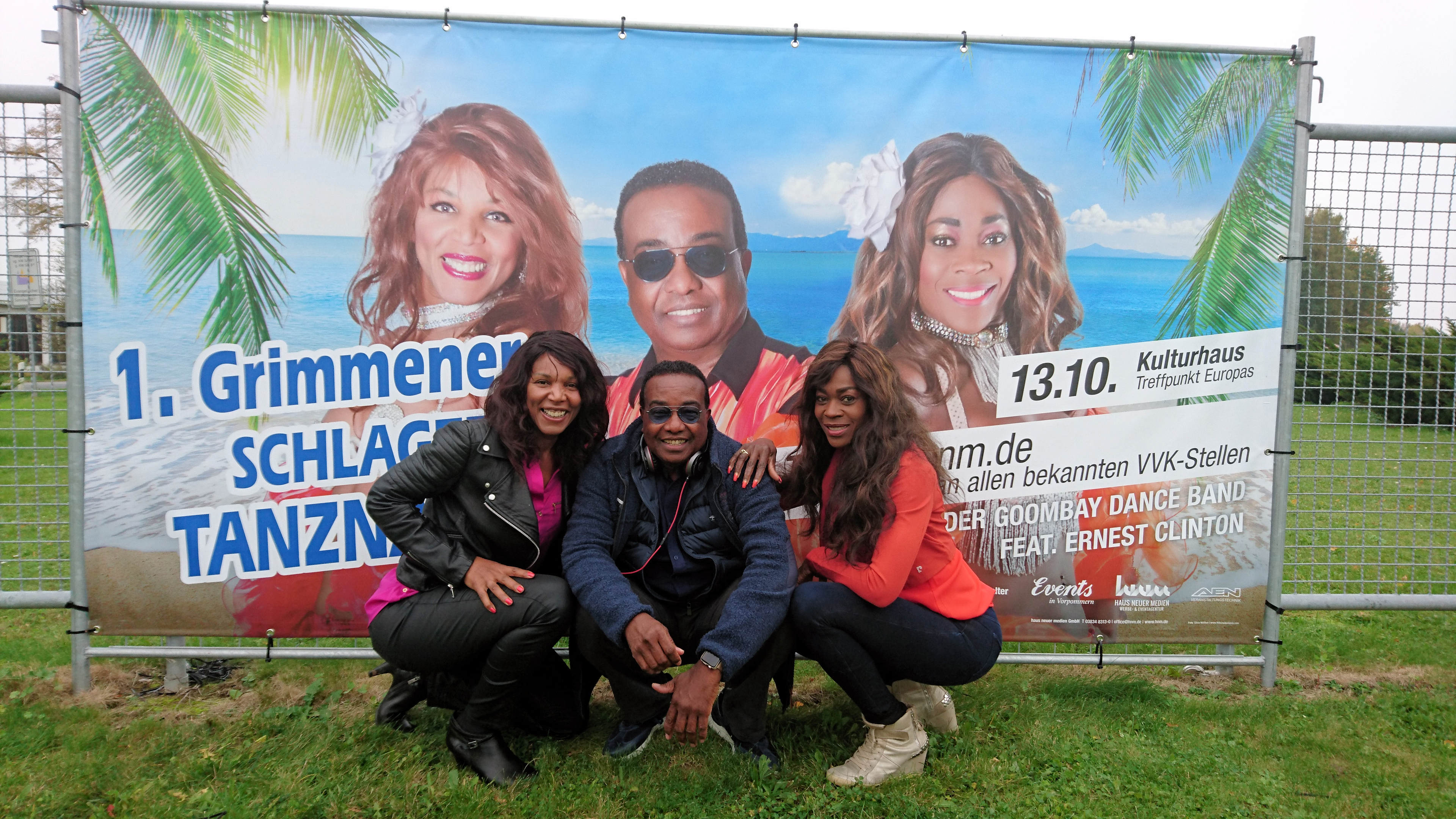
Goombay Dance Band feat. Ernest Clinton

- Oliver Bendt
- Alicia Bendt
- Dorothy Hellings
- Wendy Doorsen
- Dizzy Daniel Moorehead
- Mario Slijngaard
- Kátia Waléria Ferreira
- Ernest Clinton
- Diana Hoogdorp

== Discography ==
=== Studio albums ===
Year	Title	Peak chart positions				
Year	Title	GER	AUT	NLD	NOR	SWE
1980	Sun of Jamaica^{[A]}	3	1	4	17	15
1980	Land of Gold	41	—	—	—	—
1981	Holiday in Paradise	17	—	—	—	—
1982	Born to Win	—	—	—	—	—
1990	Von Hawaii bis Tomé^{[B]}	—	—	—	—	—
1994	Christmas Album^{[C]}	—	—	—	—	—
1995	Caribbean Beach Party	—	—	—	—	—

- A In German speaking countries, the album Sun of Jamaica was released as Zauber der Karibik, and in Spain, as Sol de Jamaica.
- B Von Hawaii bis Tomé was re-released as Sommer, Sonne, Strand and Montego Bay in 1993.
- C Christmas Album was re-released as Christmas by the Sea in 1997.

=== Compilations ===
Year	Title	Peak chart positions		
Year	Title	GER	NLD	UK
1982	Tropical Dreams	9	28	—
1982	Seven Tears	—	—	16
1983	The Best of Goombay Dance Band	—	—	—
1986	Karibische Träume	—	—	—
1988	Sun of Jamaica	—	—	—
1995	Island of Dreams	57	—	—
1995	Sun of Jamaica	—	—	—
2009	30th Anniversary Collection	—	—	—
2011	Golden Hits – Reloaded	—	—	—

=== Singles ===
Year	Title	Peak chart positions										Certifications	Album
Year	Title	GER	AUT	BEL	FRA	IRE	NLD	NZL	SWE	SWI	UK	Certifications	Album
1979	"Ring Ting Ting"	—	—	—	—	—	—	—	—	—	—		Non-Album Single
1979	"Sun of Jamaica"	1	1	1	38	14	1	19	5	3	50	GER: Platinum	Sun of Jamaica
1980	"Aloha-Oe, Until We Meet Again"	5	1	3	—	—	6	—	—	—	—		Sun of Jamaica
1980	"Bang Bang Lulu"	—	—	—	—	—	—	—	—	—	—		Sun of Jamaica
1980	"Eldorado"	4	14	—	—	—	—	—	—	—	—		Land of Gold
1980	"Rain"	9	—	—	—	—	—	—	—	—	—		Land of Gold
1981	"Seven Tears"	13	15	6	—	1	4	28	—	—	1	UK: Gold	Holiday in Paradise
1981	"Christmas at Sea"	22	—	—	—	—	—	—	—	—	—		Christmas Album
1982	"My Bonnie"	50	—	—	—	—	—	—	—	—	—		Tropical Dreams
1982	"Robinson Crusoe"	—	—	—	—	—	—	—	—	—	—		Tropical Dreams
1982	"Santorini Goodbye"	—	—	—	—	—	—	—	—	—	—		Born to Win
1982	"Born to Win"	—	—	—	—	—	—	—	—	—	—		Born to Win
1983	"If You Ever Fall in Love"	—	—	—	—	—	—	—	—	—	—		Born to Win
1984	"Don't You Cry, Caroline"	—	—	—	—	—	—	—	—	—	—		Non-album Single
1985	"Marlena"	—	—	—	—	—	—	—	—	—	—		Non-album Single
1985	"A Typical Jamaican Mess"	—	—	—	—	—	—	—	—	—	—		Non-album Single
1995	"I Love the Melody"	—	—	—	—	—	—	—	—	—	—		Caribbean Beach Party
1995	"Sun of Jamaica '95 Version" (Goombay Dance Band & Cool Summer Cuts)	—	—	—	—	—	—	—	—	—	—		Island of Dreams
2005	"Sun of Jamaica" (Antibazz & Sunstarz feat. Goombay Dance Band)	—	—	—	—	—	62	—	—	—	—		—N/a
2009	"Over the Oceans"	—	—	—	—	—	—	—	—	—	—		30th Anniversary Collection
2009	"In My Dreams"	—	—	—	—	—	—	—	—	—	—		30th Anniversary Collection
2010	"Is This the Way to the World Cup"	—	—	—	—	—	—	—	—	—	—		Golden Hits – Reloaded
2012	"Traum von Jamaica"	—	—	—	—	—	—	—	—	—	—		—N/a
2013	"Come Back 2 Jamaica"	—	—	—	—	—	—	—	—	—	—		—N/a
2013	"Aloha-Oe (Bis wir uns wiedersehen)"	—	—	—	—	—	—	—	—	—	—		—N/a
2014	"Life"	—	—	—	—	—	—	—	—	—	—		—N/a

She's a Dynamite Single 2017 1 Song, 3 Min. 42 Sec. One Love 2020 1 Song, 2:55

== See also ==
- Goombay – a form of Bahamian music and a drum used to create it
