= Book of the Stranger =

- Game of Thrones episode
- Episode no.: Season 6 Episode 4
- Directed by: Daniel Sackheim
- Written by: David Benioff; D. B. Weiss
- Cinematography by: Anette Haellmigk
- Editing by: Katie Weiland
- Original air date: May 15, 2016
- Running time: 58 minutes

Guest appearances
- Diana Rigg as Olenna Tyrell; Ben Crompton as Eddison Tollett; Jacob Anderson as Grey Worm; Natalia Tena as Osha; Gemma Whelan as Yara Greyjoy; Finn Jones as Loras Tyrell; Julian Glover as Grand Maester Pycelle; Ian Gelder as Kevan Lannister; Rupert Vansittart as Yohn Royce; Daniel Portman as Podrick Payne; Hannah Waddingham as Septa Unella; Lino Facioli as Robin Arryn; Enzo Cilenti as Yezzan zo Qaggaz; George Georgiou as Razdal mo Eraz; Eddie Jackson as Belicho Paenymion; Yousef Sweid as Ash; Michael Heath as Kesh; Joe Naufahu as Khal Moro; Tamer Hassan as Khal Forzo; Souad Faress as High Priestess of the Dosh Khaleen; Hannah John-Kamen as Ornela; Chuku Modu as Aggo; Staz Nair as Qhono; Deon Lee-Williams as Iggo; Elie Haddad as Khal Brozho; Andrei Claude as Khal Rhalko; Darius Dar Khan as Khal Quorro

Episode chronology
← Previous "Oathbreaker"	Next → "The Door"
- Game of Thrones season 6

"Book of the Stranger" is the fourth episode of the sixth season of HBO's fantasy television series Game of Thrones, and the 54th overall. The episode was written by series co-creators David Benioff and D. B. Weiss, and directed by Daniel Sackheim.

Sansa Stark arrives at the Wall and reunites with Jon Snow, and later receives a message from Ramsay Bolton challenging Jon to come take back Winterfell and rescue Rickon Stark; Margaery Tyrell is reunited with her brother, Loras; Cersei and Jaime Lannister plot with their uncle Kevan and Olenna Tyrell to have them released; and Daenerys Targaryen faces the khals.

"Book of the Stranger" received widespread acclaim from critics, who noted the opening scene showing the reunion of Jon Snow and Sansa Stark, and the final scene of Daenerys Targaryen taking charge of all the khalasars, as high points of the episode, with one critic calling them "huge, forward moving story elements that harkened back to season 1." In the United States, the episode achieved a viewership of 7.82 million in its initial broadcast. The episode was Emilia Clarke's selection for the 68th Primetime Emmy Awards to support her nomination.

This episode marks the final appearance for Natalia Tena (Osha).

== Plot ==
=== At the Wall ===
Jon, released from the Night's Watch by his death, states his desire to head south, as he is disillusioned by the betrayal of his fellow Night's Watchmen and tired of endless fighting. Sansa, Brienne, and Podrick arrive at Castle Black and Sansa is reunited with Jon. After they exchange their stories, Sansa tries to convince Jon to help her retake Winterfell, but Jon remains reluctant to fight. Frustrated, Sansa declares she will take Winterfell with or without Jon.

Brienne confronts Davos and Melisandre, informing them she killed Stannis to avenge Renly Baratheon. She warns Davos and Melisandre that she does not forget or forgive. Brienne attracts unrequited romantic interest from Tormund.

Later, a letter from Ramsay to Jon arrives. Ramsay boasts he has Rickon and demands Sansa's return, threatening to exterminate the wildlings, kill Rickon and gang-rape Sansa while forcing Jon to watch before executing him. This finally convinces Jon to agree to assist in retaking Winterfell. When Tormund warns him of the size of Ramsay's army, Sansa says Jon can leverage his status as a son of Eddard Stark to unite the North against Ramsay.

=== In Winterfell ===
Osha is brought before Ramsay. He asks her why she helped Rickon. Osha claims that she intended to betray Rickon and attempts to seduce Ramsay while reaching for a knife. Ramsay tells her he knows Osha used a similar ruse to escape Theon and kills her.

=== In King's Landing ===
Margaery is brought to meet the High Sparrow, who warns her to stay away from her life of riches and sin. He tells her, when he was a proud cobbler, he learned his wealth and pursuits were lies and that the shoeless poor were closer to the truth. He takes Margaery to see Loras, who is breaking under the Sparrows' torture and will do anything to make it stop. Margaery realizes the High Sparrow hopes to use Loras to break her, and tells him to remain strong.

Cersei meets Tommen, who brings up the High Sparrow. Tommen is reluctant to provoke him, but Cersei says he is dangerous because he has no respect for the Crown. Tommen tells Cersei that Margaery's walk of atonement will happen soon. Cersei relays the information to Kevan and Olenna. Olenna is horrified and pledges her army to defeat the Sparrows; Kevan is bound by Tommen not to attack the Sparrows but is swayed when Cersei points out that there is no order to defend the Sparrows from Olenna's army and that he can have his son Lancel back once the Sparrows are defeated.

=== In the Vale ===
Littlefinger arrives at Runestone in the Vale. Lord Yohn Royce asks how Sansa became married to Ramsay, Littlefinger claims Roose Bolton's men kidnapped her while implying Royce assisted them. He manipulates Robin Arryn to consider executing Royce, then into giving him a second chance after he pledges absolute loyalty. Littlefinger tells Robin that Sansa, his cousin, has escaped the Boltons and is taking refuge at Castle Black, but that she remains unsafe. Robin agrees to command Royce to lead the Knights of the Vale to protect her.

=== On The Iron Islands ===
Theon returns to Pyke, reuniting with Yara. Yara has not forgiven Theon staying behind when she assaulted the Dreadfort. She accuses Theon of returning to seize the throne after Balon’s death. Theon insists he only heard the news after landing and promises to support Yara's claim at the Kingsmoot.

=== In Meereen ===
Despite Grey Worm and Missandei's objections, Tyrion arranges a meeting with representatives from Astapor, Yunkai and Volantis. He proposes allowing the cities seven years to transition away from slavery, while compensating the masters for losses. In return, the masters will cease supporting the Sons of the Harpy. As the representatives deliberate, former slaves of Meereen confront Tyrion; they oppose negotiations with the masters. Grey Worm and Missandei reluctantly support Tyrion, but privately warn him the masters will use him if he tries to use them.

=== In Vaes Dothrak ===
Jorah and Daario reach Vaes Dothrak and hide their weapons, as they are forbidden in the city. In the process, Jorah accidentally reveals his greyscale infection to Daario. They encounter Daenerys outside the Temple of the Dosh Khaleen and try to convince her to sneak out of the city. She tells them they will assist her with a different plan.

Later that night, Daenerys stands before the gathered khals in the temple to hear her fate. She recalls her pregnancy ritual in this temple and Khal Drogo's vow to conquer Westeros. She accuses the khals of being unsuited to lead the Dothraki as they lack ambition, and says she will lead them. When Khal Moro and the other khals threaten to gang-rape her, she tips three braziers onto the straw floor, setting the temple on fire and killing the khals, who Jorah and Daario have barred inside. The Dothraki witness Daenerys emerge from the temple, naked but unburned. The Dothraki along with Jorah and Daario bow down and worship her.

== Production ==
=== Writing ===
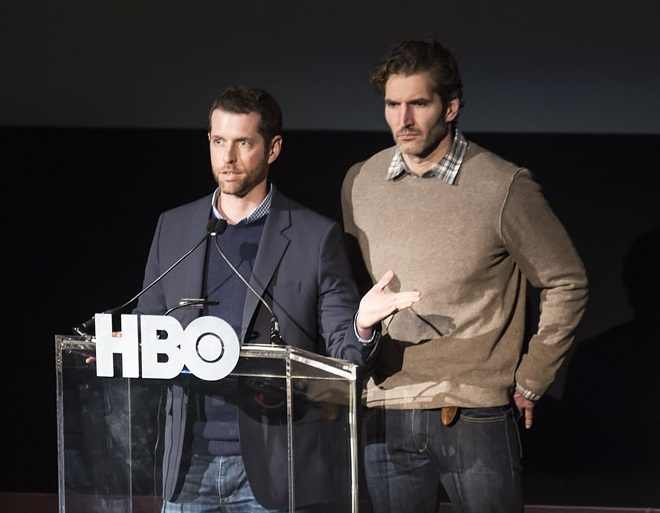
Series co-creators David Benioff and D. B. Weiss wrote the episode

"Book of the Stranger" was written by the series' creators David Benioff and D. B. Weiss. Some material in this episode is taken from the Jon XIII chapter in A Dance With Dragons. Some elements in the episode are also based on the sixth novel in the A Song of Ice and Fire series, The Winds of Winter, which author George R. R. Martin had hoped to have completed before the sixth season began airing.

=== Filming ===
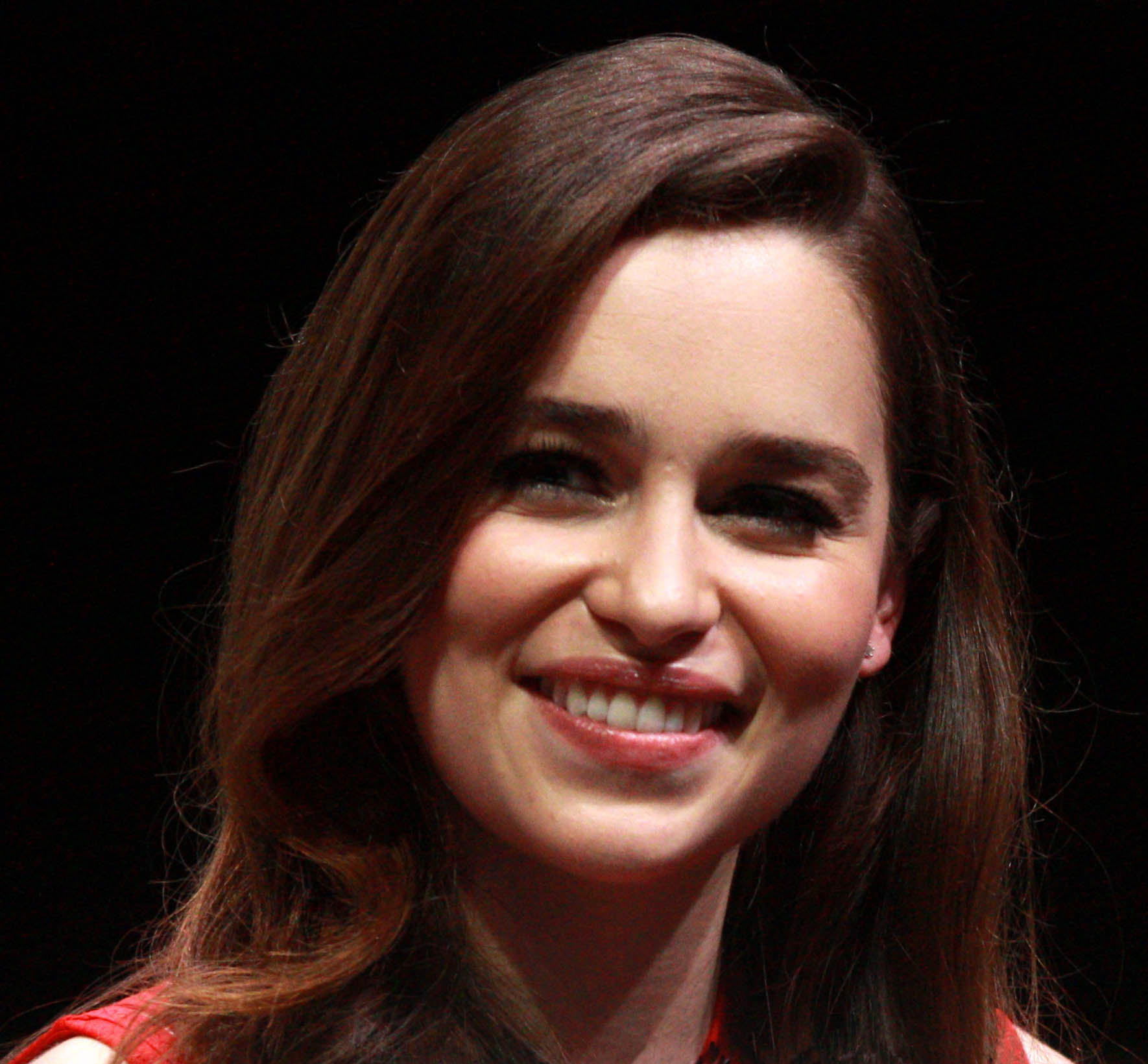
Actress Emilia Clarke portrays Daenerys Targaryen in the series

"Book of the Stranger" was directed by Daniel Sackheim. He joined the series as a director in the sixth season. He also directed the previous episode, "Oathbreaker". In an interview Sackheim commented on the Jon and Sansa reunion stating "Sometimes as a director, you're just looking at what's in front of you, and not taking into account the bigger picture and the epic nature of two siblings who have been separated for six seasons — and have never had scenes together, and were both really looking forward to it — reuniting. The only note I gave them during the scene was, "Hold yourself back. As much as it's joyous to see each other, you're equally as scared. You don't know what to expect." The operative word was fear. Fear of the unknown. In a way, it added to the emotional resonance of the scene."

For the final scene with Daenerys Targaryen emerging from the great fire of the Temple of the Dosh Khaleen, the filming took place in two different locations, with the close ups of Emilia Clarke taking place on a closed set in Belfast, and the large-scale set shots taking place in Spain. In an interview, Clarke had previously indicated she had become reluctant to do nude scenes unless it served the plot. After the episode aired, Clarke made a point to indicate that it was not a body double in the final scene of the episode, stating, "I'd like to remind people the last time I took my clothes off was season 3. That was awhile ago. It's now season 6. But this is all me, all proud, all strong. I'm just feeling genuinely happy I said 'Yes.' That ain't no body double!" She continued, "Taking off my clothes is not the easiest thing, but with the magic of the effects, I don't have to do a season 1 and go on a cliff and do it, I'm in control of it."

Series co-creator and executive producer Weiss praised Clarke's portrayal in the scene saying "Emilia absolutely crushed it. It's one of those weird scenes because it was half shot in Spain, half in Belfast. But largely due to her performance, it works brilliantly." Sackheim, the director of the episode, noted in an interview, "With the interior, there was only one way for her to play it, which is, bemused. She's the keeper of the secret. She knows how to extricate herself from this. I thought the ease with which she delivered the lines was necessary for the audience to feel jeopardy for her and for them to think she was crazy. The sequence outside was all about claiming the throne — or reclaiming the throne." Sackheim also stated, "We wanted to clearly distinguish everything we've seen from the end of the last season and the beginning of this one."

== Reception ==
=== Ratings ===
"Book of the Stranger" was viewed by 7.82 million American households on its initial viewing on HBO, which was slightly more than the previous week's rating of 7.28 million viewers for the episode "Oathbreaker". The episode also acquired a 3.9 rating in the 18–49 demographic, making it the highest rated show on cable television of the night. In the United Kingdom, the episode was viewed by 2.775 million viewers on Sky Atlantic; it also received 0.116 million timeshift viewers.

=== Critical reception ===
"Book of the Stranger" received universal praise from critics, with many citing the reunion of Jon Snow and Sansa Stark, the final scene involving Daenerys Targaryen killing the leaders of the khalasar, and the forward moving storytelling as strong points for the episode. On review aggregator website Rotten Tomatoes, the episode has an approval rating of 100% based on 63 reviews, with an average rating of 8.79/10. The website's critical consensus reads, ""Book of the Stranger"'s warm reunions, new alliances, and exquisitely fiery finale is Game of Thrones at its best." It is the highest-rated Game of Thrones episode on the website.

In a review for IGN, Matt Fowler wrote of the episode, ""Book of the Stranger" handed us two very lovely, satisfying moments with the Stark/Snow reunion at Castle Black (and the subsequent vow to defeat Ramsay and rescue Rickon) and Daenerys's conquering of Vaes Dothrak. Both were huge, forward-moving story elements that harkened back to Season 1 and gave viewers something to root for and grab onto as the show itself heads into its final arcs." Fowler also noted, "As a reader of the books with no more books to read, Season 6 has been a very interesting experience," giving the episode a 9.2 out of 10. Jeremy Egner of The New York Times also praised the scenes at Castle Black and in Vaes Dothrak, writing "Game of Thrones lived up to its billing as A Song of Ice and Fire on Sunday, as there was plenty of action in both of the signature halves of the story." Brandon Nowalk of The A.V. Club wrote, "Now that is how you set the table. "Book Of The Stranger" doesn't just check off plot points. In fact, there aren't a lot of plot points to check off. It's an episode of introductions, reunions, and wall-to-wall scheming," giving the episode an A. Eliana Dockterman of Time wrote about the strong female storylines in the episode, stating "The creators of Game of Thrones have been touting the sixth season of the show as the year when women finally wreak vengeance. The fourth episode, "Book of the Stranger," suggests that they will hold true to their word."

=== Accolades ===
Year	Award	Category	Nominee(s)	Result	Ref.
2016	Primetime Emmy Awards	Outstanding Supporting Actress in a Drama Series	Emilia Clarke as Daenerys Targaryen	Nominated	
2016	American Society of Cinematographers	Outstanding Achievement in Cinematography in Regular Series	Anette Haellmigk	Nominated	
