= Osha (A Song of Ice and Fire) =

Character from Game of Thrones

- A Song of Ice and Fire character Game of Thrones character
- Natalia Tena as Osha, from the episode "The Climb"
- First appearance: Literature: A Game of Thrones (1996); Television: "A Golden Crown" (2011)
- Last appearance: Television: "Book of the Stranger" (2016)
- Created by: George R.R. Martin
- Adapted by: David Benioff and D.B. Weiss (for Game of Thrones)
- Portrayed by: Natalia Tena

In-universe information
- Species: Human
- Gender: Female
- Occupation: Spearwife; Servant to House Stark of Winterfell
- Spouses: Television: Bruni
- Relatives: Books: Unnamed brother
- Religion: Old Gods of the Forest
- Origin: Beyond the Wall
- Culture: Free Folk

Osha is a fictional character created by George R. R. Martin, appearing in the A Song of Ice and Fire series, and in its HBO television adaptation, Game of Thrones. In the television series, she was portrayed by Natalia Tena. In the novels, Osha serves as a relatively minor character who continuously helps the Stark children, Bran and Rickon, after becoming a prisoner and later servant at Winterfell. In the television series, she serves as a major character during the early seasons of the show, with a similar background to her novel counterpart.

In the novels, Osha was first introduced in A Game of Thrones (1996) as a wildling woman from Beyond the Wall who worships the Old Gods of the Forest. Attempting to flee from the Others (known as the White Walkers in the television series), she ventures south of the Wall to escape the potential war that is about to come. However, Osha is initially spared by the Starks of Winterfell, and temporarily imprisoned by them due to her wild nature. She later gains the trust of the people of Winterfell, and eventually befriends Bran and Rickon Stark, and acts as their guardian. Osha later returns in A Clash of Kings (1998) and helps the Stark boys flee from Theon Greyjoy and survive the Sack of Winterfell. She then makes the decision to escort Rickon to safety while Bran heads north, and puts Maester Luwin out of his misery. Although her whereabouts remain unknown for some time, she is mentioned several times in A Storm of Swords (2000) and A Feast for Crows (2005). In A Dance with Dragons (2011), it is revealed that Osha, Rickon, and Shaggydog are currently seeking refuge at Skagos.

The character served a minor role in the books, but her role became much more prominent in the television series. Osha held a strong reputation during her initial appearances in the first three seasons of the HBO adaptation, before being written out of the next two. The character returned in the season 6 episode "Oathbreaker" and was subsequently killed off in the next episode by Ramsay Bolton. Osha's death was the subject to mixed and negative criticism mainly due to her promising buildup in season 3, and how quickly the scene occurred. However, the character in the television series received a positive response from critics, who cited Osha as one of the show's more intriguing characters, praising her story arc, likable personality, and development. Tena's performance as Osha also received praise from Martin himself, who preferred the character in the show over his original interpretation.

== Character overview ==
=== Book series ===
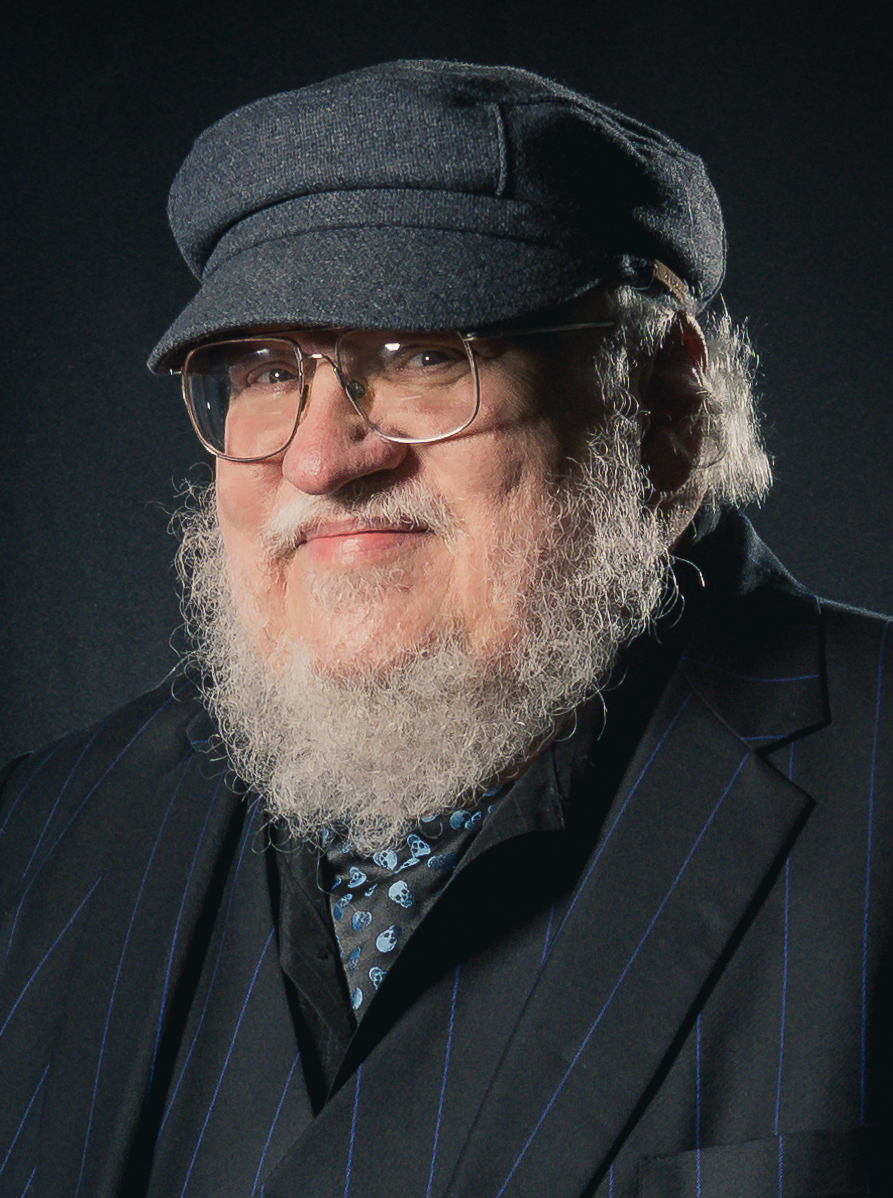
George R. R. Martin, the creator of the A Song of Ice and Fire novel series, wrote the character Osha to further introduce the threat of the Others.

Osha is a wildling spearwife from Beyond the Wall who was once loyal to Mance Rayder and his cause. Once the Others made their return, Osha and a band of wildlings passed the Wall with the help of two Night's Watch deserters. Initially an antagonist to Bran and Robb Stark, she was proven otherwise for her good behavior during her time as a prisoner of Winterfell. For her appearance, she is described as tall, lean, and shaggy-haired, while her personality is characterized as bitter, sarcastic, and charming.

Osha was created by American author George R. R. Martin, appearing in Bran Stark's point of view chapters. The character has only appeared in two books in the series — A Game of Thrones and A Clash of Kings. Martin plans on bringing Osha and Rickon back into the main storyline sometime during the next two planned books in the series, and will be giving the wildling a larger role in the future books.

=== Television series ===
In the HBO television adaptation, Game of Thrones, Osha is a wildling woman from Beyond the Wall who flees south to escape the threat of the White Walkers. She is portrayed as the fierce protector of Bran and Rickon Stark after her arrival in Winterfell. She is described as beautiful, young, and more dynamic in comparison to her book counterpart.

Natalia Tena was cast for the role of Osha. Her role as the character was revealed to the public in July 2010. Martin expressed his interest in Tena's audition: "When I saw that she was reading for Osha, my first thought was, 'She's great, but no way, she's too young and too hot.' Then I saw her reading, and none of the other Oshas had a chance. Her charisma grabbed me by the throat and I could not take my eyes off her. David and Dan felt the same way. We're all thrilled to have her."

Tena appeared as a guest star in a total of 16 episodes, during the first, second, third, and sixth seasons. Osha was written out of the fourth season after her character's temporary departure from the show. As such, Natalia Tena did not return for season 4. Art Parkinson, Tena's co-star, revealed that he and their characters would not return in the fifth season. Tena returned for the role of Osha in the season 6 episodes "Oathbreaker" and "Book of the Stranger" before her character was killed off.

== Storylines ==
=== A Game of Thrones ===
A portrait of Osha by Roman Papsuev, as described in A Game of Thrones (1996).

Osha makes her first appearance in A Game of Thrones. She and a small group of wildlings successfully sneak past the Wall with the help of a pair of Night's Watch deserters, Stiv and Wallen. They sneak into the wolfswood just north of Winterfell, and attempt to attack Bran Stark. Osha suggests they take him to Mance Rayder Beyond the Wall, but she is ignored. They are suddenly ambushed by Robb Stark, Theon Greyjoy, and the two direwolves, Grey Wind and Summer, who kill everyone but Osha. They take her in for questioning, and she briefly mentions her intentions of fleeing from the Others. She is then taken prisoner and put on surveillance, being put to work in the kitchens. Osha later goes to the weirwood tree to pray, and encounters Bran. They share a moment and bond, talking about the Old Gods of the Forest, and tells Bran about how she tried to warn Robb about the rising threat of the Others. Some time later, Maester Luwin calls Osha to carry Bran to the crypts after the boy dreamt of his father walking within them. Within the catacombs, they are shaken by the presence of Shaggydog, who attacks Maester Luwin, and is later patched up by Osha. For her good behavior, some of her shackles and chains are removed.

=== A Clash of Kings ===
In A Clash of Kings, Osha spends most of her time working in the kitchens of Winterfell or bathing in the waters near the godswood, where she gives advice to Bran when coming to her about his dreams and superstitions. When Theon returns to Winterfell, he arrives with plans to take over the castle with the help of the ironborn. Osha appears to betray the Starks when she publicly bends the knee to Theon, and, as a result, sets her free from her imprisonment. However, she later makes a plan with the Reed siblings, Jojen and Meera, to escape Winterfell. Osha seduces the guard Drennan and slits his throat, and escapes with the Reed children, Bran, Rickon, Hodor, Shaggydog, and Summer. They make it to the woods before heading back to Winterfell to hide in the crypts until Theon's search is over. The group leave the crypts a few weeks later, only to find Winterfell destroyed. They encounter Luwin badly wounded, where Osha shows him mercy upon his own request. Making the decision to separate due to the unsafe roads, Osha agrees to take Rickon and Shaggydog and head toward Kingsroad, while the rest head north.

=== A Dance with Dragons ===
In A Dance with Dragons, it is revealed by Wex Pyke that Osha, along with Rickon and Shaggydog, is hiding at Skagos, an island in the Bay of Seals. Ser Davos is instructed to travel to the island to retrieve Rickon if they want the Manderlys to join Stannis Baratheon's campaign for the Iron Throne.

=== The Winds of Winter and A Dream of Spring ===
George R. R. Martin intends to reintroduce Osha and Rickon in the A Song of Ice and Fire series, either in The Winds of Winter or A Dream of Spring, with the author mentioning the characters having a bigger role in the upcoming novels.

== TV adaptation ==
=== Season 1 ===
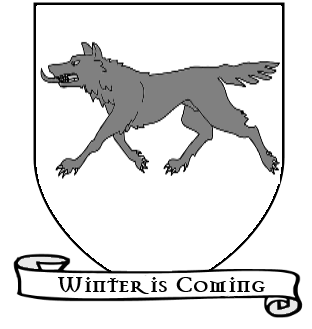
A coat of arms of House Stark.

Osha first appears in the season 1 episode "A Golden Crown", where she attempts to hurt Bran Stark just outside Winterfell alongside fellow wildlings Stiv and Wallen. However, Robb Stark and Theon Greyjoy manage to save the boy and kill her friends in the process. Osha is then captured by Theon, where she begs for her life and swears allegiance to Robb if she is spared. Robb ultimately decides to spare her life, and makes her a prisoner and puts her to work in the kitchens. She later reveals to Maester Luwin that she fled south of the Wall after encountering the White Walkers for herself, and intends on going as far south as possible. She encounters Bran in the godswood, and bonds with him to some extent before warning him about the White Walkers and that his brother's armies should be heading north, not south. Osha then gains the trust of the people of Winterfell, and spends most of her time with the Stark children, Bran and Rickon, listening to the stories of the Three-Eyed Raven. One day, Bran and Osha enter the Crypts of Winterfell after the boy fears his father may be in there. She assures him that he is alive and well, but the news is broken to Bran by Luwin that Eddard Stark had died by the hands of Joffrey Baratheon and the Lannisters.

=== Season 2 ===
Bran reveals to Osha that he is having similar dreams to the ones about his father, only instead taking on the body of a direwolf. He eventually points out the Red Comet in the sky, and suggests his own theory of its meaning. However, Osha successfully predicts that the Comet means the awakening and return of the dragons, three of which were hatched days earlier by Daenerys Targaryen. Theon returns to Winterfell in an attempt victory for House Greyjoy, and Osha watches him behead Rodrik Cassel. He, at first, successfully seizes Winterfell, and Osha later requests to see him in his chambers. She seduces the young Greyjoy, and helps Bran, Rickon, Hodor, and the two direwolves, Summer and Shaggydog, escape Winterfell. The Stark boys are presumed dead after Theon shows the city two burnt corpses of young farm boys, but Luwin notices Osha sneaking into the crypts. He learns that the boys did survive, and promises Osha to keep the situation a secret. Theon is betrayed by his own men, and Winterfell is sacked. After the sack, Osha and the others leave the crypts to find the city destroyed, and find Maester Luwin dying under a tree. He tells Osha to take the boys to the Wall, where their bastard brother Jon Snow currently resides. She promises to take them there, before Luwin allows Osha to kill him out of mercy.

=== Season 3 ===
Osha travels with the Stark boys, their direwolves, and Hodor as they head for the Wall. They are crossed by the Reed siblings, Jojen and Meera, who try to reason with Bran. Jojen reveals who they are, and that Bran has a mission to reach the Three-Eyed Raven Beyond the Wall. Over time, Osha grows wary of Jojen and his ideas, and tries to confront him about putting ideas into Bran's head. Jojen reveals that they have no plan of going to the Wall, but instead insists on traveling Beyond the Wall to seek the Three-Eyed Raven. Outraged, Osha warns them of the dangers and threats that lie ahead, which provokes her to tell them about her husband, Bruni, revealing that he had gone missing and came back days later as a White Walker and almost killed Osha. She burnt down her hut with Bruni inside and fled south of the Wall before the dangers became prominent. With her motivations clear, Osha tells Bran she will not go further than the Wall and will not break her promise to Luwin. During a storm, the group take refuge inside an abandoned windmill, while a group of wildlings outside fight. Jojen reveals to Bran that he is a warg after accidentally warging Hodor, which leads him to warging himself into Summer and unknowingly saves Jon Snow and Ygritte. Osha is still frustrated over the entire situation, but Bran suggests that she take Rickon to Last Hearth to seek refuge with House Umber, loyal allies to House Stark. Agreeing, Osha and Rickon say their goodbyes, and part ways.

=== Season 6 ===
At some point prior to season 6, Osha successfully arrived at Last Hearth with Rickon Stark and Shaggydog. However, after the death of Greatjon Umber, his son, Smalljon, betrays them and delivers them to Ramsay Bolton in Winterfell. Smalljon Umber proves the boy to be Rickon Stark by giving Ramsay the severed head of Shaggydog. Osha and Rickon are then both taken prisoner by the Boltons. Ramsay later has Osha brought to him, after she is cleaned and dressed. Throughout their conversation, Osha lies about her loyalty to House Stark in an attempt to assassinate Ramsay. She attempts to seduce him, but he reveals that Theon told him about how a wildling woman helped the Stark boys escape. Caught in her lies, Osha reaches for a knife on the table to stab Ramsay, but she is suddenly stabbed in the throat — falling to the floor and bleeding out. Her promises to both Bran Stark and Luwin are ultimately broken when Rickon himself dies by the same man during the Battle of Winterfell.

== Other appearances ==
Osha appeared in the comic book adaptations of A Game of Thrones and A Clash of Kings. The character also appeared and is mentioned in the "Wargs and the Sight" featurette in the third season of Histories & Lore, an animated short series based on Game of Thrones lore.

For merchandise, she appears on trading cards released by Rittenhouse Archives based on the TV series, and the A Game of Thrones and A Clash of Kings board and card games based on the books.

== Reception ==
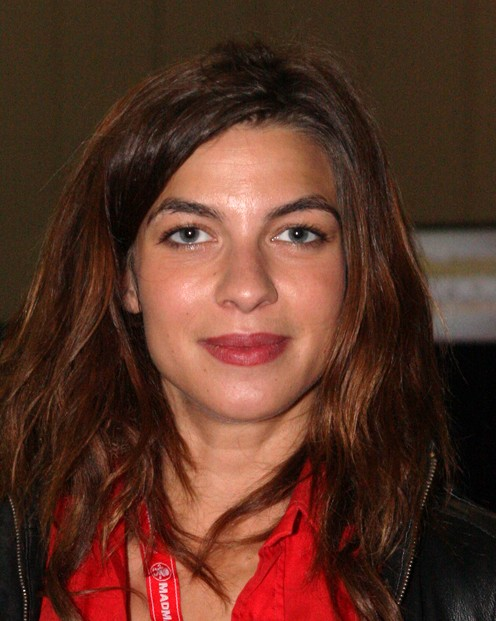
Natalia Tena portrayed Osha in HBO's Game of Thrones, receiving positive and favorable reviews from critics.

Osha, in the books, received an average reception from critics. She is one of the characters intended to introduce new plot points within her respective storyline to help the story forward, particularly the Others. Osha's personality, however, has been viewed as being one-noted.

Osha has received a generally positive reception in the television adaptation, and has received praise for her character arc, development, and strong personality. Due to her positive reputation, she is often regarded as one of Game of Thrones' most underrated and underused characters. The character was ranked 63rd on IGN's list of "Top 100 Game of Thrones Characters", and ranked the 3rd best female character by Collider. Osha was also ranked the 27th best character by ScreenCrush, and the 38th best major character by fans, according to Ranker. Joe Grantham for Game Rant remarked Osha's characterization to be one of the best changes from the books to the TV series, writing: "As an actor or actress, there is likely no praise higher than that of the author of the source material that is being adapted [...] Of course, the showrunners also had a role in Osha's character being more fleshed out as she was given more screen time and involved in plots that book Osha took no part in. Even so, Tena deserves a lot of credit here." Furthermore, Game Rant also listed Osha on their list of the "7 Game of Thrones Characters Who Are Better in the Show," ranking her in first. In June 2024, Osha was ranked the second best short-lived character in Game of Thrones by Comic Book Resources, cited for her "brave, smart, and sadistic" personality.

George R. R. Martin revealed that Osha was one of his favorite characters in the television series and one of the few characters where he preferred the TV counterpart—which he called "younger, more attractive and more dynamic"—over their book counterpart. He explained that this preference was mostly due to Natalia Tena's performance, which he continuously praised during the first three seasons of the show. As a result, Martin stated that he wants to reconsider the character's direction in the books and give her more of a dynamic storyline, noting that "the only actress who's really made me rethink a character is Natalia Tena as Osha".

Although the episode "Book of the Stranger" was met with widespread critical acclaim, Osha's death in the episode was met with mostly negative criticism. Her death has been regarded as unnecessary and pointless to the plot by numerous critics, who complained about the character's possible potential, later claiming her death did not serve either a purpose or plot point in the show. "Osha really deserved a larger role in season six and while she would inevitably have died eventually, this really wasn't the right send-off for her," wrote Robin Baxter for WhatCulture. Critics also complained the only reason for Osha's shocking return was to have her killed off instead of being entirely written out of the show. Her death has also been remarked as both pointless and random by Screen Rant. Mike Rougeau for IGN believed Osha's death at the hands of Ramsay Bolton was unjust, and that the character deserved better since being absent for the past two seasons.
