= Oathbreaker (Game of Thrones) =

- Game of Thrones episode
- Episode no.: Season 6 Episode 3
- Directed by: Daniel Sackheim
- Written by: David Benioff; D. B. Weiss
- Cinematography by: Anette Haellmigk
- Editing by: Katie Weiland
- Original air date: May 8, 2016
- Running time: 52 minutes

Guest appearances
- Max von Sydow as the Three-eyed raven; Diana Rigg as Olenna Tyrell; Owen Teale as Alliser Thorne; Anton Lesser as Qyburn; Julian Glover as Pycelle; Jacob Anderson as Grey Worm; Natalia Tena as Osha; Ben Crompton as Eddison Tollett; Faye Marsay as the Waif; Roger Ashton-Griffiths as Mace Tyrell; Ian Gelder as Kevan Lannister; Hafþór Júlíus Björnsson as Gregor Clegane; Brenock O'Connor as Olly; Kae Alexander as Leaf; Dean S. Jagger as Smalljon Umber; Paul Rattray as Harald Karstark; Art Parkinson as Rickon Stark; Meena Rayann as Vala; Joe Naufahu as Khal Moro; Souad Faress as the High Priestess of the Dosh Khaleen; Staz Nair as Qhono; Hannah John-Kamen as Ornela; Robert Aramayo as young Eddard Stark; Luke Roberts as Ser Arthur Dayne; Eddie Eyre as Ser Gerold Hightower; Brian Fortune as Othell Yarwyck; Michael Condron as Bowen Marsh

Episode chronology
← Previous "Home"	Next → "Book of the Stranger"
- Game of Thrones season 6

"Oathbreaker" is the third episode of the sixth season of HBO's fantasy television series Game of Thrones, and the 53rd overall. It was written by series co-creators David Benioff and D. B. Weiss, and directed by Daniel Sackheim, his directorial debut for the series.

Jon Snow is found alive by Ser Davos Seaworth; Ramsay Bolton is presented with the gift of Rickon Stark; Bran Stark, accompanied by the Three-eyed Raven, witnesses the confrontation at the Tower of Joy, where his father attempts to rescue his sister, Lyanna; but Bran is ultimately prevented from entering the tower; Daenerys Targaryen arrives at Vaes Dothrak where her consequences for leaving the khalasar will be determined, and in Braavos, a blind Arya Stark gives up her old life and sees a new as "no one".

"Oathbreaker" received high praise from critics, who found the episode to have strong, forward-moving storytelling, although not presenting as many shocking moments, while also listing the Tower of Joy flashback sequence as the episode's highlight. In the United States, the episode premiere achieved a viewership of 7.28 million in its initial broadcast. Filming of the first exterior scene at Castle Black took place over the course of several months, as a result of a rock slide that occurred on the set. The episode earned a nomination at the 68th Primetime Emmy Awards for Outstanding Single-Camera Picture Editing for a Drama Series.

== Plot ==
=== Beyond the Wall ===
Bran and the Three-eyed Raven observe a vision of a young Eddard Stark, Lord Howland Reed, and four other rebel soldiers arriving at the Tower of Joy in Dorne's Red Mountains at the climax of Robert's Rebellion. Ser Arthur Dayne and Ser Gerold Hightower greet Eddard as he arrives. Eddard announces that Prince Rhaegar Targaryen and the Mad King have been killed and asks why Ser Arthur was not present at the Battle of the Trident. Ser Arthur replies that he has been ordered to stay at the tower. After Eddard demands to know where his sister Lyanna is, the battle begins. Eddard kills Ser Gerold, but Ser Arthur defeats most of Eddard's men by himself, and is about to kill Eddard when a wounded Howland rises and stabs Ser Arthur through the back before Eddard delivers the fatal blow.

When a woman's scream emerges from the tower, Ned begins to run inside. The Three-Eyed Raven explains that the rest of the vision is intended for another time, but Bran demands to stay and calls out to Ned. Ned turns for a second, seemingly having heard Bran's voice, but continues inside, before the Three-Eyed Raven pulls Bran out of the vision. Back in the cave, Bran demands to know what was in the tower. The Three-Eyed Raven does not attend Bran's demands, saying he will eventually have to leave the cave but first must learn "everything".

=== In the Narrow Sea ===
As they sail to Oldtown, Samwell Tarly explains to Gilly that women are not welcomed at the Citadel and that he intends to leave her and her baby, Little Sam, with his family at Horn Hill while he trains to be a maester, but reassures her that she and Little Sam are all that matter to him. Gilly declares that Sam is the father of Little Sam.

=== At Winterfell ===
Smalljon Umber meets with Ramsay and Harald Karstark. Despite his dislike of Roose Bolton and his refusal to pledge fealty to Ramsay, Smalljon wishes to ally with the Boltons in exchange for protection from the Wildlings who Jon has let settle south of the Wall, unaware that it was merely to protect them from the White Walkers. To demonstrate his loyalty, Smalljon presents Rickon Stark and Osha as his prisoners, proving Rickon's identity by also presenting the severed head of Rickon's direwolf Shaggydog.

=== In King's Landing ===
Cersei and Jaime interrupt a Small Council meeting at which Lord Kevan Lannister, Lady Olenna Tyrell, Lord Mace Tyrell, and Grand Maester Pycelle are present. Cersei and Jaime mention that Ellaria and the Sand Snakes have taken control of Dorne, and demand to sit in on the Small Council; when they refuse to leave, Kevan instead orders the council to leave the room.

Tommen marches into the Great Sept, demanding to let Cersei see Myrcella's tomb. The High Sparrow explains she will be able to once her sins have been atoned for and she has faced trial. After telling their respective soldiers to stand down, the High Sparrow explains the importance of the Mother in the Faith of the Seven, showing Tommen his resemblance to his mother.

=== In Braavos ===
Arya trains using sticks with the Waif in the House of Black and White. In between duels, the Waif questions Arya about who she used to be. Arya reveals all of her family members and reveals that she had taken the Hound off her kill list before she left him to die, conflicted about her desire to kill him. After she is finally able to parry the Waif's hits, Jaqen offers Arya her sight back if she says her name. When she replies "a girl has no name", Jaqen offers her water from the poisonous well in the temple's entrance chamber. Arya drinks and her sight is restored.

=== In Vaes Dothrak ===
Daenerys arrives with Khal Moro's khalasar at Vaes Dothrak and is escorted to meet with the Dosh Khaleen. The elder of the Dosh Khaleen tries to sympathize with Daenerys and explains that the various khalasars have gathered at Vaes Dothrak to discuss which cities and towns to conquer. They have also met to discuss what to do with Daenerys; the elder hopes, for Daenerys' safety, that they decide to let her remain with the Dosh Khaleen.

=== In Meereen ===
Varys interrogates Vala, who had conspired with the Sons of the Harpy in their attacks on Unsullied. Vala confesses that if she gives him information on the Sons of the Harpy they will likely kill her. Varys offers her and her son safe passage to Pentos in exchange for information.

Later, Varys explains to Tyrion, Grey Worm, and Missandei that he has discovered that the slave masters of Yunkai, Astapor, and Volantis have been financing the Sons of the Harpy. Tyrion warns that taking military action will leave Meereen defenseless and they conclude that the only way to defeat the Sons of the Harpy is to hunt them down. Tyrion asks Varys to send his "little birds" to deliver a message to the leaders of Astapor, Yunkai, and Volantis.

=== At the Wall ===
After his resurrection, Jon is greeted by Davos and Melisandre. Melisandre tells Jon that her religion prophesies the return of a heroic prince and suggests that this prince may not be Stannis, as she first thought, but Jon. Jon enters the courtyard to meet with the wildlings and reunite with Tormund and Edd. Tormund tells Jon that the Wildlings think he is a god since he returned from the dead.

Jon presides over the hanging of Thorne, Olly, Othell Yarwyck, and Bowen Marsh. While Yarwyck requests that Jon tell his mother at White Harbor that he died fighting the wildlings, which Jon appears to accept, Thorne is unrepentant, declaring that he only did what he thought was right for the Night's Watch and would make the same choice again. Thorne accepts his inevitable death, and tells Jon he'll be fighting the wildlings' battles forever. Olly says nothing as he stares at Jon, furious that Jon is still alive and that his desire for the Night's Watch to eliminate the wildings will never be fulfilled. After hanging the mutineers, Jon resigns from the Night's Watch, his oath technically having been fulfilled upon his death.

== Production ==
=== Writing ===
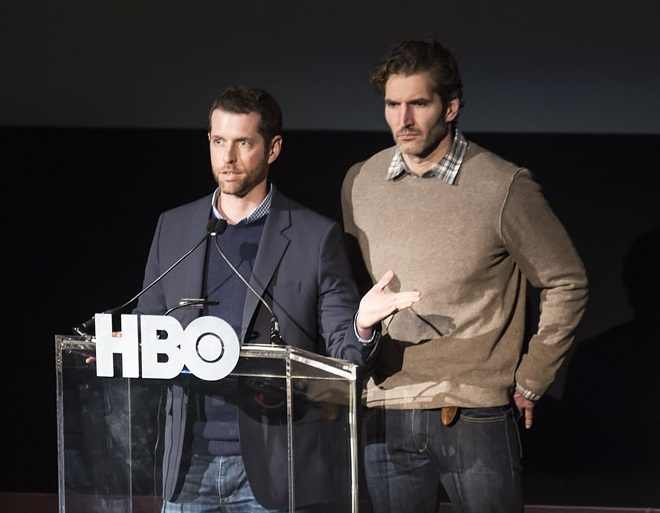
The episode was written by series co-creators David Benioff and D. B. Weiss.

"Oathbreaker" was written by the series' creators David Benioff and D. B. Weiss. Some elements in the episode were based on the sixth novel in the A Song of Ice and Fire series, The Winds of Winter, which author George R. R. Martin had hoped to have completed before the sixth season began airing. It also contains elements from the chapter "The Blind Girl" from A Dance with Dragons and several chapters of Samwell Tarly's voyage to the Citadel from A Feast for Crows. The raid on the Tower of Joy was an event portrayed in a dream of Ned Stark in the chapter "Eddard X" of A Game of Thrones.

In the "Inside the Episode" feature for "Oathbreaker", showrunner Weiss stated of the Tower of Joy flashback that "One of the best things about being able to go back with Bran and look at the past is to be able to see the discrepancy between the received history, the things that everybody knows about the things that happened, and what actually happened." Benioff continued, "Every kid that grows up in Westeros, they all hear about this legendary sword fight that took place twenty years ago, and as far as Bran knew, it was just his father beat this legendary guy." Weiss also stated "Honor was so important to Ned Stark that it was worth losing his own life for, but he was completely ready to let go of that honor and excellence to do something that he really felt was more important. It could make a very, very strong defense for Ned doing what he did, and it certainly does puncture the mythology of Ned Stark that's running through this world, especially after his death."

For the first scene of the episode, when Jon Snow arises from the table, Weiss stated that "Jon coming back to life was something in the first, first version we wrote originally had more talking. And as we saw it on the page written out, we realized it was just too much dialogue, we decided to just give the kind of awe of that moment its due."

=== Casting ===
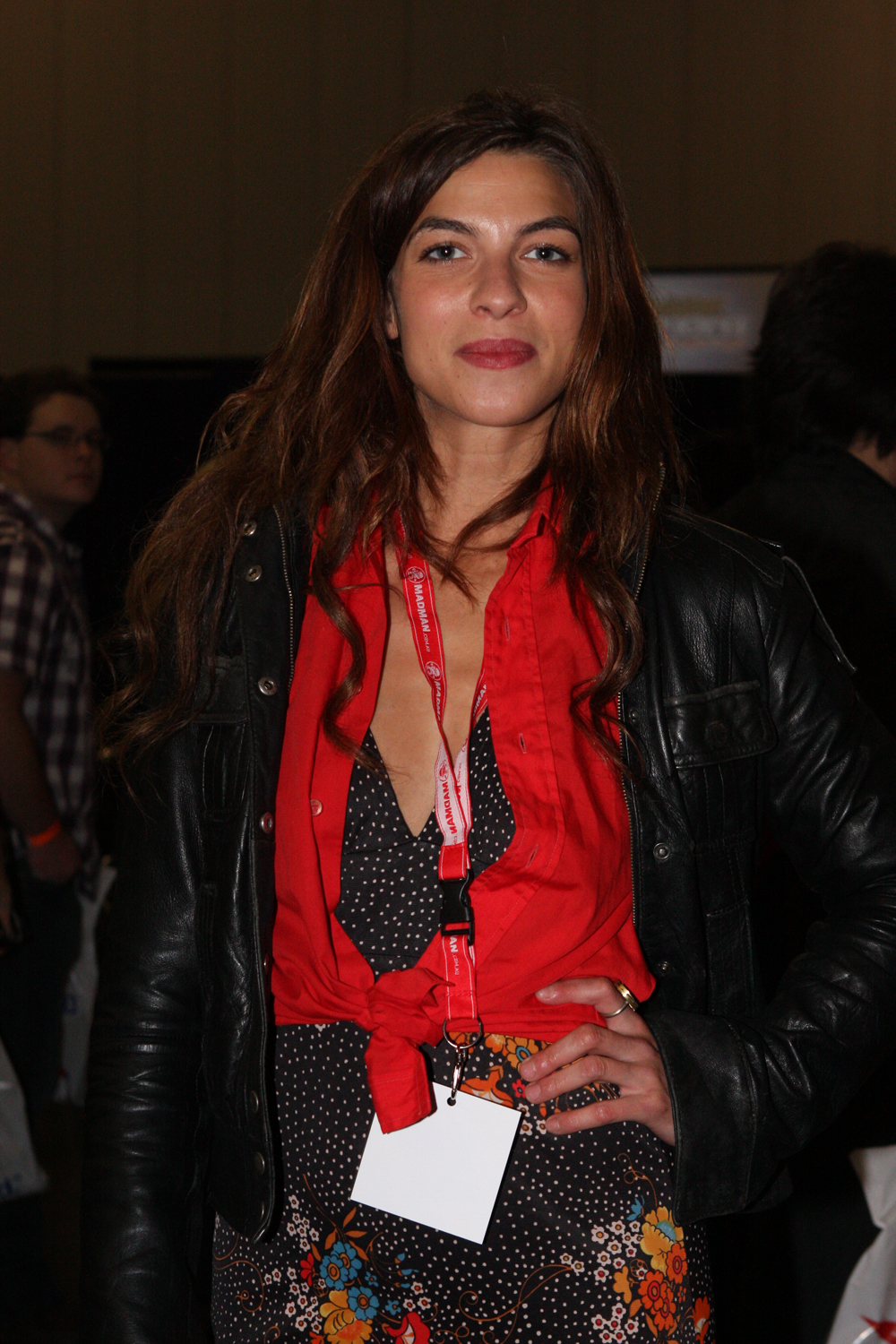
Actress Natalia Tena returned to the series as Osha the Wildling.

Actors Natalia Tena (Osha) and Art Parkinson (Rickon Stark), both of whom had recurring roles in the series until the third season, make their first return appearance in the episode. The episode was also the final appearance for a recurring character since the first season episode "Lord Snow", Ser Alliser Thorne, portrayed by Owen Teale.

For the flashback scene at the Tower of Joy, actor Robert Aramayo was cast to play a young Eddard Stark. In an interview with Access Hollywood, Aramayo stated that he was a big fan of the series, and that "it was an honor and a gift to be able to be a part of it." In regards to portraying the character similar to Sean Bean, who played Eddard Stark in the first season, Aramayo noted, "I didn't want to get too hung up on sounding like Sean because I think that would've sort of got in my way if I'd have just situated all my work in that place. I watched a lot of footage of him playing Ned in the first season again, repeatedly, especially one particular fight scene that he was in and I think that was the biggest help for me when creating this version of Ned – was watching what Sean did with Ned in the first season and trying to work out what a younger man's version of that is." In a separate interview with The Hollywood Reporter Aramayo spoke about auditioning for the role, stating, "The chance to audition to be on the show was a dream, even to audition. It was an absolute dream to me. I was very excited to audition, and landing the role was beyond my wildest dreams. Then when I found out the role was Ned, it was overwhelming."

=== Filming ===
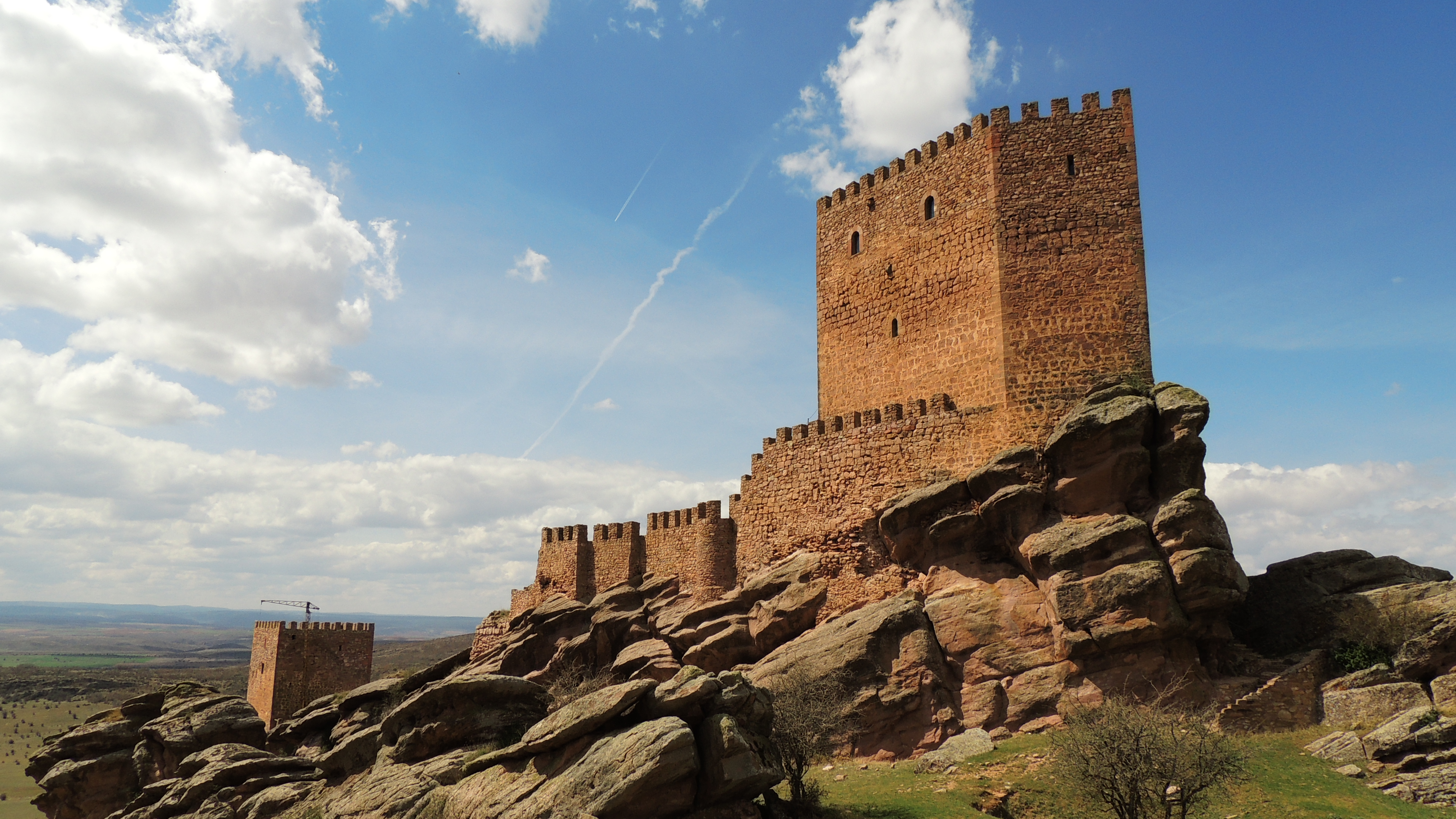
The Castle of Zafra in Guadalajara, Spain stood in for the Tower of Joy in the episode.

"Oathbreaker" was directed by Daniel Sackheim. Sackheim is a first time director for Game of Thrones; he also directed the subsequent episode, "Book of the Stranger".

Filming of the first exterior scene at Castle Black and the final scene with Jon Snow executing the traitors of the Night's Watch took place over the course of several months, with the execution scene being filmed first out of the two. As a result of a rock slide that occurred on the set of where Castle Black is staged at Magheramorne Quarry, scheduling for the filming of the scenes had to be re-worked by executive producer Bernie Caulfield and producer Chris Newman, with showrunner D. B. Weiss saying, "It actually worked out for the best – some of the stuff we were shooting in that location benefited from the additional prep time the rock slide gave us."

The Castle of Zafra in Guadalajara, Spain stood in for the Tower of Joy in the flashback scene involving a young Ned Stark and Ser Arthur Dayne, as witnessed by Bran Stark and the Three-eyed Raven. During filming of the scene, it was reported widely among media sources after a fan of the series had snuck their way onto a nearby mountain and filmed a small portion of the fighting scenes that occurred. Robert Aramayo (young Eddard Stark) spoke about the filming of the scene in an interview following the airing of the episode and stated, "We all went through a bunch of training, which continued through our three- or four-day shoot in Spain. It was intense. It was not easy. I did not find it easy to shoot that fight sequence. It's not an easy routine at all. And Luke Roberts, who plays Arthur Dayne, he's incredible, man." He continued, "If your move's getting blocked, you obviously can't know that, just like when you're playing a scene through dialogue. You can't know the response your scene partner gives you is going to be the response you'll get. You hope it is. Likewise, in a fight, if you're going to chop somebody's arm off or stab them in the gut — the intention is to chop that arm off or stab someone in the gut, and you have to play that intention fully. I didn't expect it, but it takes a lot of skill in terms of acting to play."

== Reception ==
=== Ratings ===
"Oathbreaker" was viewed by 7.28 million American households on its initial viewing on HBO, which was nearly identical to the previous week's rating of 7.29 million viewers for the episode "Home". The episode also acquired a 3.7 rating in the 18–49 demographic, making it the highest rated show on cable television of the night. In the United Kingdom, the episode was viewed by 2.797 million viewers on Sky Atlantic; it also received 0.132 million timeshift viewers.

=== Critical reception ===
"Oathbreaker" was very positively received by critics, citing the Tower of Joy flashback, the final scene with Jon Snow executing his assassins, and the storytelling as strong points for the episode. On the review aggregator Rotten Tomatoes, who surveyed 48 reviews of the episode and judged 87% of them to be positive, with an average rating of 7.7/10. The website's critical consensus reads, "The most solid episode of season six so far, 'Oathbreaker' boasts no shocking reveals or breathless cliffhangers, just strong forward-moving storytelling."

In a review for IGN, Matt Fowler wrote, "With Jon's final choice in "Oathbreaker," the show seemed to make a huge step forward into the endgame. One where we might see things that have been set up for a long time start to pay off. Not everyone's story is firing on all cylinders at the moment, Tyrion was actively bored while waiting for news this week, but enough is going on in the North and at King's Landing to carry the series right now." Likewise, Emily VanDerWerff of Vox wrote, ""Oathbreaker" is a crisp, lean, nicely paced episode of Game of Thrones. It's one of those episodes where the characters are mostly being positioned for future episodes, but it's a solidly executed version of that basic template." Alyssa Rosenberg of the Washington Post wrote that she believed this was "The strongest episode of the sixth season of Game of Thrones to date." While Erik Kain of Forbes noted "The season has been full of revelations, but things are still building. That's okay. I love the tension and not knowing exactly what's coming."

James Hunt of What Culture wrote, "Another week of table setting, and a very entertaining one at that ... It didn't quite reach the high watermark of last week's instalment, but there was still a lot of great stuff here." Steve Johnson of The Baltimore Sun noted, "Instead of the heavy action of the season's first two hours, Sunday's Game of Thrones, called "Oathbreaker," was more about putting pieces on the chess board into place." Sarah Larson of The New Yorker wrote in her review, "Last week, we saw Jon Snow re-enter life; this week, we may have been in proximity to him entering it, the first time, in the usual way." Tim Surette of TV.com called the episode, "Exhilarating".

=== Accolades ===
Year	Award	Category	Nominee(s)	Result	Ref.
2016	Primetime Creative Arts Emmy Awards	Outstanding Single-Camera Picture Editing for a Drama Series	Katie Weiland	Nominated	
