= Eddie Eyre =

British actor

- Born: Edward Wilson; 24 July 1988 (age 38)
- Education: London Academy of Music and Dramatic Art (BA)
- Occupation: Actor
- Known for: Game of Thrones; EastEnders

Eddie Eyre (born Edward Wilson, 24 July 1988) is a British actor who is known for his role as Josh Hemmings in the BBC soap opera EastEnders.

== Education ==
Eyre was educated at Abingdon School from 1999 to 2006. He was trained at the London Academy of Music and Dramatic Art.

== Career ==
Eyre's stage career began at The Old Vic, where he took part in the 24 Hour Plays, an event hosted by Kevin Spacey that has included actors such as Lily Cole, Catherine Tate, Douglas Booth and Kaya Scodelario. Eyre's other stage performances include Yakov in Headlong's production of The Seagull, Henry Crawford in the Mansfield Park stage adaptation by Tim Luscombe, produced by the Theatre Royal, Bury St Edmunds, and the lead role of Detective Sergeant Trotter in the West End production of the world's longest running play The Mousetrap.

Eyre played Gerold Hightower in the sixth season of the HBO series Game of Thrones. He joined the cast of BBC soap opera EastEnders as Josh Hemmings, a love interest for Lauren Branning (Jacqueline Jossa), in March 2017 and departed the following February. In May 2022, he appeared in an episode of the BBC soap opera Doctors as Steve Hedges.

== Filmography ==
=== Film ===
Year	Title	Role	Notes
2021	Black Cab	Trevor	

=== Television ===
Year	Title	Role	Notes
2016	Game of Thrones	Gerold Hightower	Episode: "Oathbreaker"
2017–2018	EastEnders	Photocopier Guy	1 episode
2017–2018	EastEnders	Josh Hemmings	53 episodes
2019	The Athena	Casper Conway	Episode: "The List"
2019	Ransom	Rob Cooper	Episode: "Justice"
2020	Cursed	Mosk	Episode: "Nimue"
2020	Bard from the Barn	Unknown	Episode: "Marcius & Aufidius"
2022	Doctors	Steve Hedges	Episode: "An Unexpected Surprise"
2022	The Walk-In	Far Right Spokesperson	1 episode
2023	Father Brown	Joe Bloom	Episode: "The Hidden Man"
2023	Casualty	Sam Whitefell	Episode: "One Hundred Years"
2024	House of the Dragon	Ser Axell Bulwer	5 episodes

== See also ==
- List of Old Abingdonians
