= Game of Thrones season 6 =

Game of Thrones
- Season 6
- Region 1 DVD cover
- Showrunners: David Benioff; D. B. Weiss
- Starring: Peter Dinklage; Nikolaj Coster-Waldau; Lena Headey; Emilia Clarke; Kit Harington; Liam Cunningham; Carice van Houten; Natalie Dormer; Indira Varma; Sophie Turner; Maisie Williams; Conleth Hill; Alfie Allen; Gwendoline Christie; Jonathan Pryce; Michiel Huisman; Michael McElhatton; Iwan Rheon; Iain Glen; Nathalie Emmanuel; Kristofer Hivju; Tom Wlaschiha; Dean-Charles Chapman; Isaac Hempstead Wright; John Bradley; Hannah Murray; Aidan Gillen; Rory McCann; Jerome Flynn
- No. of episodes: 10

Release
- Original network: HBO
- Original release: April 24 – June 26, 2016

Season chronology
- ← Previous; Season 5 Next → Season 7

The sixth season of the fantasy drama television series Game of Thrones premiered on HBO on April 24, 2016, and concluded on June 26. It consists of 10 episodes, each of approximately 50–60 minutes long. Much of the season's storyline is derived from content not yet published in George R. R. Martin's A Song of Ice and Fire series, although a significant amount of material from A Feast for Crows, A Dance with Dragons and the upcoming sixth novel The Winds of Winter, which Martin outlined to showrunners David Benioff and D.B. Weiss, was used. The series was adapted for television by Benioff and Weiss. HBO had ordered the season on April 8, 2014, together with the fifth season, which began filming in July 2015 primarily in Northern Ireland, Spain, Croatia, Iceland and Canada. The season cost over $100 million to produce.

The season follows the continuing struggle among the noble families of Westeros for the Iron Throne. The Starks and allies defeat the Bolton forces in the "Battle of the Bastards" reuniting Sansa Stark and Jon Snow, who is proclaimed the King in the North, while Ramsay Bolton is killed. In Essos, Tyrion Lannister rules Meereen while Daenerys Targaryen is held captive by the Dothraki, after which she burns the Khals, emerges from the flames of their temple alive leading the surviving Dothraki to pledge her their loyalty. At King's Landing, Margaery Tyrell capitulates to the High Sparrow, who becomes more powerful by influencing King Tommen. The imprisoned Cersei avoids her trial by destroying the Great Sept with wildfire, killing the Sparrows, her uncle, and the Tyrells. Tommen commits suicide in the wake of the blast, and his mother is crowned Queen of the Seven Kingdoms. Ellaria Sand and Oberyn Martell's daughters kill Doran and Trystane Martell and seize control of Dorne. Arya Stark finishes her assassin training and returns to Westeros to resume her revenge list. Bran Stark becomes the Three-Eyed Raven, escapes the White Walkers, and returns to the Wall. Yara Greyjoy fails in her bid to be queen of the Iron Islands, so she and Theon ally with Daenerys. Varys secures an alliance for her with Olenna and the Dornish.

Game of Thrones features a large ensemble cast, including Peter Dinklage, Nikolaj Coster-Waldau, Lena Headey, Emilia Clarke, and Kit Harington. The season introduced new cast members, including Max von Sydow, Pilou Asbæk, and Essie Davis, and returned Isaac Hempstead Wright and David Bradley to the series. Additionally, Rory McCann returned to the series after his character, Sandor Clegane, was presumably left for dead in the fourth season. The season also marked the final appearances of Iwan Rheon, Michael McElhatton, Kristian Nairn, Natalie Dormer, Jonathan Pryce, and Finn Jones.

Critics praised its production values, writing, plot development, and cast. Game of Thrones received the most nominations for the 68th Primetime Emmy Awards, with 23 nominations, and won 12, including that for Outstanding Drama Series for the second year in a row. U.S. viewership rose compared to the previous season, and by approximately 13 percent over its course, from 7.9 million to 8.9 million by the finale.

== Episodes ==
No. overall	No. in season	Title	Directed by	Written by	Original release date	U.S. viewers (millions)
51	1	"The Red Woman"	Jeremy Podeswa	David Benioff & D. B. Weiss	April 24, 2016	7.94
Alliser Thorne assumes command of the Night's Watch, while Ser Davos and several loyalists bolt themselves inside a room with Jon's body; Edd leaves Castle Black to seek help. At Winterfell, Ramsay briefly mourns Myranda, while Sansa and Theon are pursued by Bolton men. Brienne and Podrick arrive, killing the pursuers. Sansa formally accepts Brienne into her service. Jaime arrives in King's Landing with Myrcella's body and vows to Cersei to take back everything taken from them. Obara and Nymeria murder Trystane Martell while, in Sunspear, Ellaria and Tyene kill Prince Doran and Areo Hotah after Doran learns of Myrcella's murder. In Meereen, Tyrion and Varys discover ships are burning in the harbor. Jorah and Daario Naharis continue tracking Daenerys, whom the Dothraki take to Khal Moro. In Braavos, a blinded Arya begs on the street. Each day, the Waif beats her with a staff and forces her to fight. In her bedchamber, Melisandre removes her bejeweled necklace revealing her true form, a frail and elderly woman.
52	2	"Home"	Jeremy Podeswa	Dave Hill	May 1, 2016	7.29
In a vision of the past, Brandon sees his father Ned, uncle Benjen, their sister Lyanna, and young Hodor at Winterfell. Edd returns to Castle Black with Tormund and a group of Wildlings, imprisoning Thorne and the other mutineers. Tommen asks Cersei to help him be strong, as the High Sparrow threatens Jaime. Astapor and Yunkai have reverted to slavery. In the catacombs, Tyrion unchains Rhaegal and Viserion. In Braavos, Jaqen allows Arya to return to the House of Black and White. Roose Bolton's wife gives birth to a boy; Ramsay murders Roose, his stepmother, and the infant. En route to Castle Black, Brienne tells Sansa that she had encountered Arya. Theon leaves to head home to the Iron Islands. Euron Greyjoy also returns to Pyke Island and murders his brother, King Balon. Melisandre attempts and apparently fails to resurrect Jon, but after everyone leaves the room, Jon awakens.
53	3	"Oathbreaker"	Daniel Sackheim	David Benioff & D. B. Weiss	May 8, 2016	7.28
En route to Oldtown to train as a Maester, Samwell first visits Horn Hill, his family home, intending to leave Gilly and Little Sam with his family, claiming Little Sam is his biological son. In a vision, Brandon sees young Ned and Howland Reed, Meera's father, dishonorably defeat a Targaryen Kingsguardsmen at the Tower of Joy in Dorne. Varys discovers that the masters of Slavers' Bay are financing the Sons of the Harpy. In King's Landing, the High Sparrow preaches to Tommen, while Jaime, Cersei and her bodyguard, Ser Gregor Clegane, interrupt a small council meeting, only to be shunned by Kevan Lannister and the Tyrells. The Waif rigorously trains Arya, whose sight is restored after accepting herself as "no-one". In Winterfell, Smalljon Umber asks Ramsay to help protect the North from the Wildlings, presenting Rickon Stark, Osha, and the head of Rickon's direwolf as gifts. Jon executes Thorne, Olly, and the other mutineers. He renounces his oath and puts Edd in charge of the Night's Watch.
54	4	"Book of the Stranger"	Daniel Sackheim	David Benioff & D. B. Weiss	May 15, 2016	7.82
Sansa, Brienne and Podrick arrive at Castle Black. Sansa wants Jon to retake the North. In Meereen, Tyrion offers the masters of Slaver's Bay peace in exchange for slavery being abolished within seven years; this angers former slaves. Littlefinger returns to the Vale to mobilize its soldiers against Ramsay. Daario learns about Jorah's greyscale; they find Daenerys in Vaes Dothrak. In King's Landing, Margaery is allowed to visit Loras in his cell. Cersei, Jaime, Kevan, and Olenna shelve their differences and plot to defeat the Sparrows. Theon arrives at Pyke Island and supports Yara's claim to the Iron Islands throne. In Winterfell, Ramsay kills Osha, who tries to assassinate him. Ramsay sends Jon a message, threatening Rickon unless Sansa is returned. Sansa convinces Jon to retake Winterfell. In the temple of the Dosh Khaleen, Daenerys tells the Khal leaders that they are not fit to lead the Dothraki. She ignites the temple, killing them. When she emerges unscathed, the Dothraki horde kneels before her.
55	5	"The Door"	Jack Bender	David Benioff & D. B. Weiss	May 22, 2016	7.89
Sansa secretly meets with Littlefinger, who offers the Vale's forces and says her great uncle, Brynden Tully, is building an army in Riverrun. Distrusting him, Sansa declines his help. Jon and Sansa leave Castle Black to gather Northern houses' support. Sansa sends Brienne to meet with her great-uncle, Brynden Tully. In Braavos, Arya is tasked to assassinate Lady Crane, an actress. Beyond the Wall, Bran learns that the Children of the Forest created the White Walkers to protect themselves from mankind. In the Iron Islands, Euron wins the Kingsmoot, despite killing Balon; Yara, Theon, and their supporters flee, taking many ships. In Essos, Daenerys orders Jorah to find a cure for his greyscale, then return. In Meereen, Kinvara, a red priestess, meets Tyrion and Varys and promises to support Daenerys. In Bran's unaccompanied vision, the Night King touches him, leaving his mark and making the cave vulnerable. The Night King, White Walkers, and hordes of wights attack the cave, killing the Three-Eyed Raven, several Children, Summer, and Hodor, whose younger self was rendered mentally disabled by Meera’s order to "Hold the door".
56	6	"Blood of My Blood"	Jack Bender	Bryan Cogman	May 29, 2016	6.71
Meera escapes the cave with Bran, who is immersed in the Three-Eyed Raven's transferred visions. In the forest, the wights attack, but a man on horseback saves them. At Horn Hill, Sam's father, Randyll, demeans him as a soft bookworm and insults Gilly for being a Wildling. That night, Sam takes House Tarly's ancestral Valyrian steel sword, Heartsbane, and leaves with Gilly and Little Sam. Arya warns Lady Crane of her planned assassination, then retrieves Needle. Jaqen allows the Waif to find and kill Arya. Jaime attempts to rescue Margaery from the Faith Militant, only to find she has repented and Tommen has forged an alliance with the Faith. Tommen forbids Jaime to serve as a King's Guard in King's Landing and orders him to aid Walder Frey, who is holding Edmure Tully hostage, to retake Riverrun from Brynden Tully. Benjen Stark, who saved Meera and Bran, says he was turned by the White Walkers but the Children of the Forest unturned him with Dragonglass. Daenerys mounts Drogon and inspires the Dothraki to cross the Narrow Sea and conquer Westeros for her.
57	7	"The Broken Man"	Mark Mylod	Bryan Cogman	June 5, 2016	7.80
The Hound is alive and living a simple, non-violent life, having been saved by a Septon and his followers. When rogue Brotherhood members threaten and eventually slaughter the group, the Hound seeks revenge. Margaery convinces her grandmother to return to Highgarden after the High Sparrow threatens to punish Olenna, following her and Jaime's confrontation with the Faith. Margaery then secretly signals to Olenna that she has not converted to the Faith. Jon, Sansa, and Davos recruit the wildlings, House Mormont, and others but remain outnumbered by the Boltons. Sansa secretly sends a message to the Vale requesting aid. Jaime arrives in Riverrun with Bronn and assumes command of the siege. Jaime unsuccessfully parleys with Brynden Tully. Theon and Yara spend their last night in Volantis before sailing to Meereen to ally with Daenerys. Arya prepares to return to Westeros until the Waif, disguised as an old crone, viciously stabs her.
58	8	"No One"	Mark Mylod	David Benioff & D. B. Weiss	June 12, 2016	7.60
Tommen abolishes trial by combat, to Cersei's dismay, who planned to win her trial with the Mountain as her champion. In Riverrun, Brienne fails to persuade Brynden Tully to surrender the castle and ride safely North. After Jaime threatens to kill Edmure's infant son, Edmure enters the castle and orders Tully forces to stand down. Brynden is killed fighting the Lannisters while Brienne and Podrick escape. Varys departs for Westeros on a secret mission. Meereen comes under naval assault by the slaving cities; Daenerys returns on Drogon, accompanied by the Dothraki. The Hound kills four of the rogues, then encounters Beric Dondarrion and Thoros, who captured the others. They execute them and ask Clegane to join the Brotherhood. Arya seeks out Lady Crane, who tends her wounds. The Waif kills Lady Crane and pursues Arya through the streets. Arya leads the Waif into darkened catacombs and kills her using Needle. Arya places the Waif's face in the House's columned collection room. She tells Jaqen that she is Arya Stark of Winterfell, and she is going home.
59	9	"Battle of the Bastards"	Miguel Sapochnik	David Benioff & D. B. Weiss	June 19, 2016	7.66
On Tyrion's advice, Daenerys meets with three slave masters to negotiate a surrender, which they refuse. The three dragons attack and burn the slavers' ships. Grey Worm kills two masters, leaving one alive to report what he witnessed. Theon and Yara meet with Daenerys and Tyrion to offer an alliance in exchange for the Iron Islands being independent. Near Winterfell, the Stark and Bolton armies meet on the battlefield. Ramsay feigns releasing Rickon before killing him with an arrow. In the battle, the Stark forces are pinned by Bolton soldiers until the Knights of the Vale arrive and overwhelm them. Ramsay flees to Winterfell, but the wildling giant Wun Wun breaches the gate and Ramsay is taken prisoner after Jon beats him senseless. Later, Sansa watches Ramsay's starving hounds devour him.
60	10	"The Winds of Winter"	Miguel Sapochnik	David Benioff & D. B. Weiss	June 26, 2016	8.89
Before her trial, Cersei destroys the Sept of Baelor by wildfire, killing the High Sparrow, the Tyrells, Lancel and Kevan Lannister, hundreds of nobles, and the Faith Militant; Qyburn has Pycelle killed. Cersei reveals her incest with Jaime and that she killed Robert Baratheon to Septa Unella before having Ser Gregor Clegane torture Septa Unella until she dies. Distraught over Margaery's death, Tommen commits suicide. In Dorne, Varys meets with Olenna and Ellaria, seeking an alliance between Daenerys and their Houses against the Lannisters. Davos confronts Melisandre over Princess Shireen's death, resulting in Jon banishing her. Led by Lyanna Mormont, the Wildlings and the surviving northern houses pledge loyalty to Jon as King of the North. Sansa rebuffs Littlefinger's romantic overtures. Sam and Gilly reach the Citadel in Oldtown. Benjen accompanies Brandon and Meera to the Wall but is unable to go further. In a vision, Bran sees Ned finding Lyanna Stark as she lies dying after giving birth (to Jon Snow) during King Robert's rebellion. Jaime returns to King's Landing, and Cersei crowns herself Queen of the Seven Kingdoms. Daenerys names Tyrion Hand of the Queen and sails for Westeros with the Greyjoys, her armies, and her dragons, leaving Daario Naharis and the Second Sons behind to rule Meereen until new leaders are elected.

== Cast ==
=== Main cast ===
- Peter Dinklage as Tyrion Lannister
- Nikolaj Coster-Waldau as Jaime Lannister
- Lena Headey as Cersei Lannister
- Emilia Clarke as Daenerys Targaryen
- Kit Harington as Jon Snow
- Liam Cunningham as Davos Seaworth
- Carice van Houten as Melisandre
- Natalie Dormer as Margaery Tyrell
- Indira Varma as Ellaria Sand
- Sophie Turner as Sansa Stark
- Maisie Williams as Arya Stark
- Conleth Hill as Varys
- Alfie Allen as Theon Greyjoy
- Gwendoline Christie as Brienne of Tarth
- Jonathan Pryce as the High Sparrow
- Michiel Huisman as Daario Naharis
- Michael McElhatton as Roose Bolton
- Iwan Rheon as Ramsay Bolton
- Iain Glen as Jorah Mormont
- Nathalie Emmanuel as Missandei
- Kristofer Hivju as Tormund Giantsbane
- Tom Wlaschiha as Jaqen H'ghar
- Dean-Charles Chapman as Tommen Baratheon
- Isaac Hempstead Wright as Bran Stark
- John Bradley as Samwell Tarly
- Hannah Murray as Gilly
- Aidan Gillen as Petyr "Littlefinger" Baelish
- Rory McCann as Sandor "The Hound" Clegane
- Jerome Flynn as Bronn

=== Guest cast ===
The recurring actors listed here are those who appeared in season 6. They are listed by the region in which they first appear:

==== In the North, including the Wall ====
- Daniel Portman as Podrick Payne
- Natalia Tena as Osha
- Art Parkinson as Rickon Stark
- Owen Teale as Alliser Thorne
- Ben Crompton as Eddison Tollett
- Brenock O'Connor as Olly
- Charlotte Hope as Myranda
- Elizabeth Webster as Walda Bolton
- Paul Rattray as Harald Karstark
- Dean Jagger as Smalljon Umber
- Tim McInnerny as Robett Glover
- Bella Ramsey as Lyanna Mormont
- Sean Blowers as Wyman Manderly
- Tom Varey as Cley Cerwyn
- Richard Rycroft as Maester Wolkan
- Michael Condron as Bowen Marsh
- Brian Fortune as Othell Yarwyck
- Ian Whyte as Wun Wun
- Murray McArthur as Dim Dalba

==== Beyond the Wall ====
- Max von Sydow as the Three-eyed Raven
- Ellie Kendrick as Meera Reed
- Kristian Nairn as Hodor
- Joseph Mawle as Benjen Stark
- Kae Alexander as Leaf
- Vladimir "Furdo" Furdik as the Night King

==== In the Riverlands ====
- David Bradley as Walder Frey
- Clive Russell as Brynden Tully
- Tobias Menzies as Edmure Tully
- Richard Dormer as Beric Dondarrion
- Paul Kaye as Thoros of Myr
- Tim Plester as Black Walder Rivers
- Daniel Tuite as Lothar Frey
- Jóhannes Haukur Jóhannesson as Lem
- Ricky Champ as Gatins
- Ian Davies as Morgan
- Ian McShane as Brother Ray

==== On the Iron Islands ====
- Gemma Whelan as Yara Greyjoy
- Patrick Malahide as Balon Greyjoy
- Pilou Asbæk as Euron Greyjoy
- Michael Feast as Aeron Greyjoy

==== In Dorne ====
- Alexander Siddig as Doran Martell
- Toby Sebastian as Trystane Martell
- Jessica Henwick as Nymeria Sand
- Keisha Castle-Hughes as Obara Sand
- Rosabell Laurenti Sellers as Tyene Sand
- DeObia Oparei as Areo Hotah

==== In King's Landing ====
- Diana Rigg as Olenna Tyrell
- Julian Glover as Grand Maester Pycelle
- Finn Jones as Loras Tyrell
- Anton Lesser as Qyburn
- Roger Ashton-Griffiths as Mace Tyrell
- Eugene Simon as Lancel Lannister
- Ian Gelder as Kevan Lannister
- Hannah Waddingham as Septa Unella
- Nell Tiger Free as Myrcella Baratheon
- Hafþór Júlíus Björnsson as Gregor Clegane
- Josephine Gillan as Marei
- Nathanael Saleh as Arthur
- Annette Hannah as Frances

==== In the Vale ====
- Lino Facioli as Robin Arryn
- Rupert Vansittart as Yohn Royce

==== In Braavos ====
- Faye Marsay as the Waif
- Richard E. Grant as Izembaro
- Essie Davis as Lady Crane
- Leigh Gill as Bobono
- Eline Powell as Bianca
- Rob Callender as Clarenzo
- Kevin Eldon as Camello

==== In Meereen ====
- Jacob Anderson as Grey Worm
- George Georgiou as Razdal mo Eraz
- Eddie Jackson as Belicho Paenymion
- Enzo Cilenti as Yezzan zo Qaggaz
- Ania Bukstein as Kinvara
- Gerald Lepkowski as Zanrush
- Meena Rayann as Vala

==== In Vaes Dothrak ====
- Joe Naufahu as Khal Moro
- Andrei Claude as Khal Rhalko
- Tamer Hassan as Khal Forzho
- Staz Nair as Qhono
- Chuku Modu as Aggo
- Deon Lee-Williams as Iggo
- Souad Faress as the High Priestess
- Hannah John-Kamen as Ornella

==== In the Reach ====
- James Faulkner as Randyll Tarly
- Samantha Spiro as Melessa Tarly
- Freddie Stroma as Dickon Tarly
- Rebecca Benson as Talla Tarly

==== In flashbacks ====
- Robert Aramayo & Sebastian Croft as Eddard Stark
- Matteo Elezi as Benjen Stark
- Aisling Franciosi & Cordelia Hill as Lyanna Stark
- Wayne Foskett as Rickard Stark
- Fergus Leathem as Rodrik Cassel
- Annette Tierney as Old Nan
- Sam Coleman as Hodor
- Leo Woodruff as Howland Reed
- Luke Roberts as Arthur Dayne
- Eddie Eyre as Gerold Hightower
- David Rintoul as Aerys II Targaryen

== Production ==
=== Crew ===
The writing staff for the sixth season includes executive producers and showrunners David Benioff and D. B. Weiss, producer Bryan Cogman, and Dave Hill. Author George R. R. Martin, who had written one episode for each of the first four seasons, did not write an episode for the sixth season, as he chose to resume working on the sixth A Song of Ice and Fire novel, The Winds of Winter. The directing staff for the sixth season was Jeremy Podeswa (episodes 1 and 2), Daniel Sackheim (episodes 3 and 4), Jack Bender (episodes 5 and 6), Mark Mylod (episodes 7 and 8), and Miguel Sapochnik (episodes 9 and 10). Sackheim and Bender were first-time Game of Thrones directors, with the rest each having directed two episodes in the previous season.

=== Writing ===
With the end of the fifth season, the plot has reached the most recent novel in Martin's A Song of Ice and Fire series, A Dance with Dragons. Season 6 director Jeremy Podeswa said in August 2015, "Right now in season six, what we're shooting currently isn't based on anything in the book. It's fully based on discussions the writers have had with George Martin, because the series has now surpassed the books in terms of what's available." Actress Natalie Dormer, who plays Margaery Tyrell, later added that the show's writers "know where it's got to go and what [George Martin]'s intentions for the characters are. But they are just filling in the gaps."

The season premiere starts off right where the fifth season ended. Material from an excerpt of The Winds of Winter, published online, regarding a traveling theater troupe located in Braavos that stages a play called "The Bloody Hand", about the events that have taken place in King's Landing since the beginning of the series, is included in the sixth season.

=== Filming ===
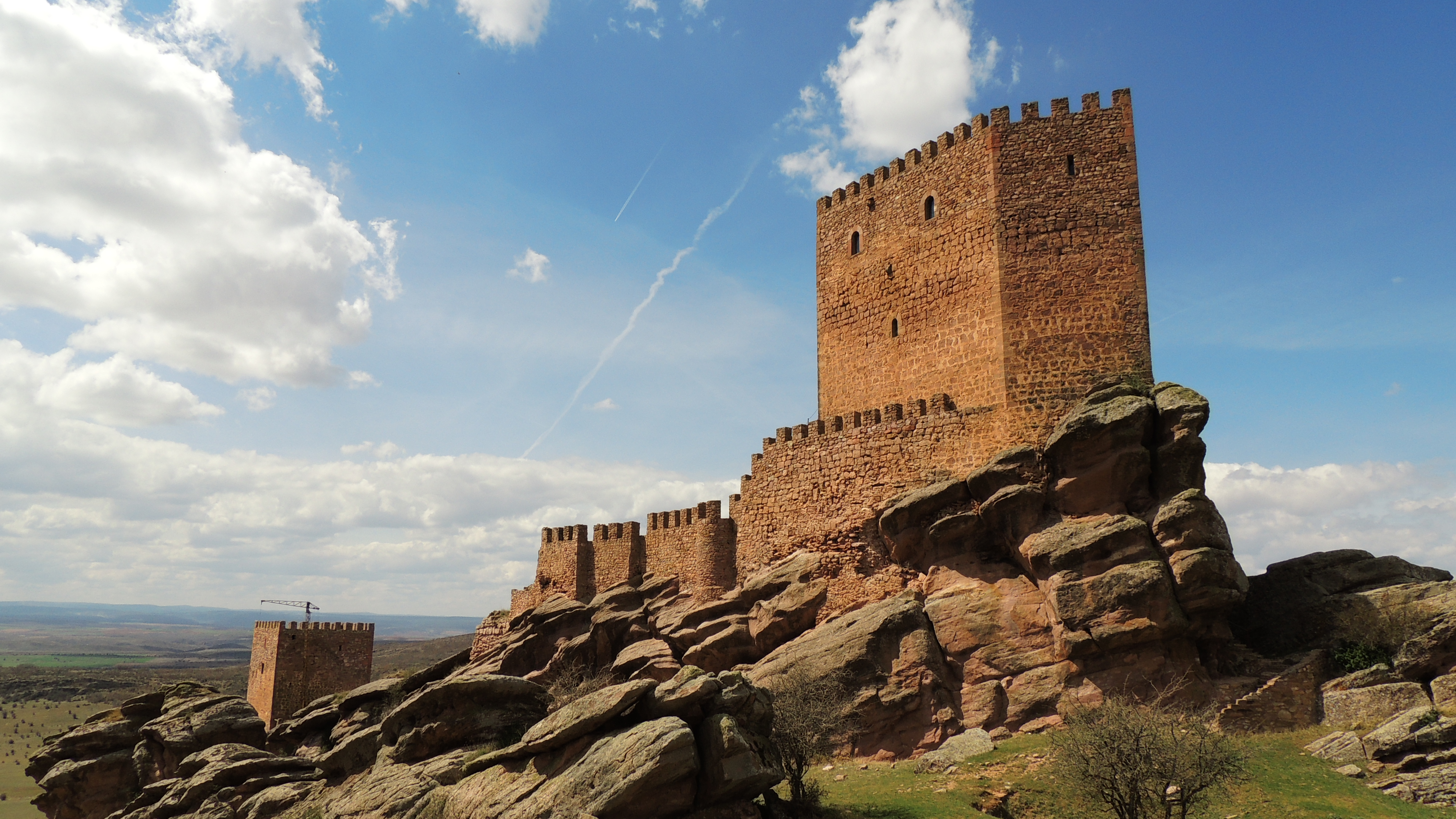
The Castle of Zafra in Guadalajara, Spain is among the filming locations.

Filming for the sixth season began in July 2015 and ended on December. The budget for the sixth season increased compared to the previous seasons as each episode cost over $10 million, totaling over $100 million for the full season and setting a new high for the series. The season filmed in five different countries: Northern Ireland, Spain, Croatia, Iceland, and Canada.

Like the previous seasons, a large amount of production took place in Northern Ireland, mainly in Belfast and on the Causeway Coast, including film locations in the Binevenagh, Magilligan area, which was used to film scenes for the Dothraki Grasslands, and Larrybane Quarry and Ballintoy Harbour, both used for scenes in the Iron Islands. For the siege of Riverrun, the small village of Corbet was used. As in previous seasons, some of Castle Black was set at the abandoned Magheramorne quarry.

During September and October, the show also filmed in Spain, specifically in Girona, Navarre, Peniscola, and Almería. Specific locations included the Castle of Zafra in Guadalajara, the Bardenas Reales Natural Park in Navarre, the Alcazaba in Almería, and the Castle of Santa Florentina in Canet de Mar.

In August 2015, HBO announced that for the first time since season 1 the show would not be filming any scenes in Croatia. The Croatian city of Dubrovnik has stood in for King's Landing since the beginning of season 2; nearby cities such as Klis, Split and Šibenik have been used to depict various other locations. Contradicting the statement by HBO, filming took place in Dubrovnik, where the cast of the show were seen in costume in October 2015.

Only a very small portion of the season was filmed in Canada (north of Calgary, Alberta): the scenes featuring Jon Snow's wolf, Ghost (played by animal actor Quigly). However, some of the special effects were created at Montreal's Rodeo FX studios which has won Emmy Awards previously for its work on the series.

=== Casting ===
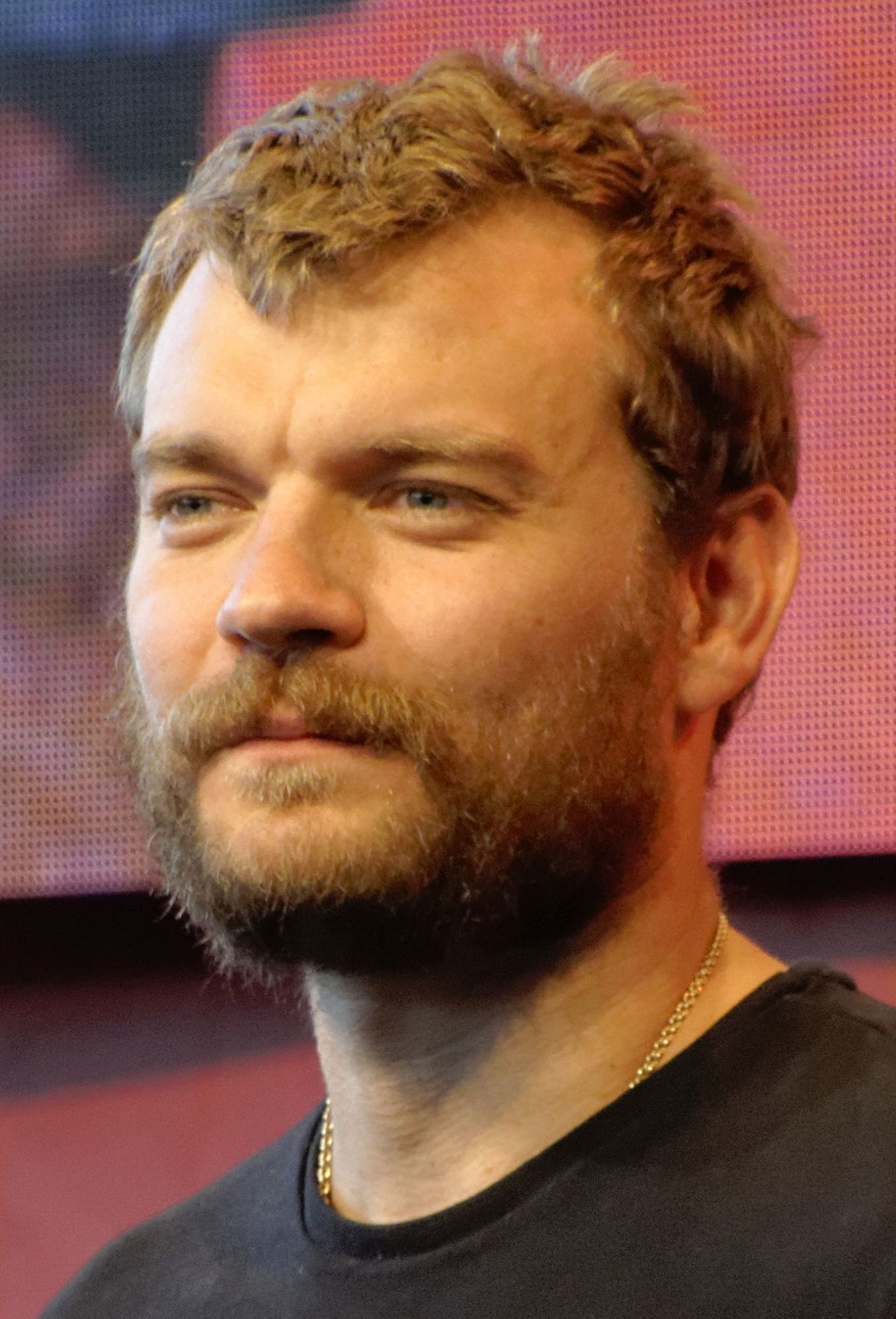
Pilou Asbæk plays Euron Greyjoy.

The sixth season saw the return of Isaac Hempstead Wright as Bran Stark, Kristian Nairn as Hodor, Ellie Kendrick as Meera Reed, Gemma Whelan as Yara Greyjoy, and Rory McCann as Sandor "The Hound" Clegane, who did not appear in the fifth season. Clive Russell, Tobias Menzies, Patrick Malahide, Richard Dormer, and Paul Kaye also returned to the show as Brynden Tully, Edmure Tully, Balon Greyjoy, Beric Dondarrion, and Thoros of Myr after not appearing since the third season. Jonathan Pryce as the High Sparrow was added to the series main cast after appearing in a recurring role in the previous season.

Across the Narrow Sea, Melanie Liburd plays a red priestess from Asshai who is in R'hllor's service. At the Reach, House Tarly is introduced, with Freddie Stroma joining the cast as Samwell Tarly's brother Dickon, a character so far only mentioned in the novels. Other members of House Tarly that were introduced were Randyll Tarly, played by James Faulkner; Melessa Tarly, played by Samantha Spiro; and Talla Tarly, portrayed by Rebecca Benson.

Veteran actor Max von Sydow was cast to play the Three-Eyed-Raven, Bran's trainer, previously played by Struan Rodger in the fourth-season finale, "The Children". David Bradley confirmed in August 2015 that he would be returning to the show as Walder Frey after last appearing in the third-season finale, "Mhysa", but he did not confirm when. After the second official trailer was released, it was confirmed that Bradley would appear in the sixth season. Danish actor Pilou Asbæk joins the show as Theon Greyjoy's uncle, pirate captain Euron Greyjoy. Ricky Champ played Gatins, an outlaw in a band using religion to extort the people of the countryside. A young Ned Stark was portrayed by Sebastian Croft in a flashback scene.

The sixth season also included a traveling theater troupe located in Braavos that stages a play called "The Bloody Hand", about the events that have taken place in King's Landing since the beginning of the series. Essie Davis and Kevin Eldon joined the cast in this theater troupe, portraying actors playing Cersei Lannister and Ned Stark, respectively, while Richard E. Grant was cast as the troupe's manager. Members of Icelandic indie band Of Monsters and Men appear as the musicians of the Braavos theatre group.

=== Music ===
The soundtrack for the season was digitally released in June 2016, and on CD late the following month. The album reached No. 27 on the Billboard 200, No. 1 on Soundtrack chart and No. 79 on the Canadian Albums chart on its digital release, with the track from the season finale "Light of the Seven" reaching No. 1 on Billboard's Spotify Viral 50 chart.

== Reception ==
=== Critical response ===
Game of Thrones season 6: Critical reception by episode
Season 6 (2016): Percentage of positive critics' reviews tracked by the website Rotten Tomatoes

On Metacritic, the season (based on the first episode) has a score of 73 out of 100 based on 9 reviews, indicating "generally favorable" reviews. On Rotten Tomatoes, the sixth season has an approval rating of 94% from 667 critics with an average rating of 8.25 out of 10. The site's critical consensus reads, "Bloody and captivating as always, Game of Thrones plunges back into the midst of a world touched by grief, dread, and precarious sexuality."

New York Daily News wrote about the premiere episode, "It's finally back - in all its gory grandeur." New York Post praised the "gloriously brutal moments" in the premiere episode. Mary McNamara of the Los Angeles Times praised some of the humorous moments in the premiere. The Boston Globe called the premiere a "busy hour, leaping from place to place to catch us up with the Game of Thrones gang and set the stage for the sixth season... But fun was afoot." Vulture gave the premiere a score 4 out of 5 and found the episode more "compelling" than season 5, while Observer.com praised the episode for not "overly-rushing".

The Orlando Sentinel eulogized the show for "playing by its own rules", and not "pander for fans' affection and take easy storytelling routes" like other shows. Slate gave the premiere a positive review and stated, "Game of Thrones is finally off book, having lapped George R.R. Martin's slowly gestating A Song of Ice and Fire series. Finally, it seemed, anything could happen." Matt Zoller Seitz of Vulture gave the premiere positive review and stated, "The world the characters inhabit is still a hugely dangerous one, but at no point did I feel as though the writers were showing us beautiful butterflies in preparation of pulling their wings off." Entertainment Weekly gave the premiere a score of 'B' and stated, "Few shows on television look better than this one, but it's coming up on great-drama retirement age. Game of Thrones is getting older. But it's not dead, yet." NPR praised the season for "reaching new heights", and "setting up its endgame in spectacular, meticulous fashion".

=== Ratings ===
The season finale had 8.89 million viewers on its initial airing on HBO, up 10 percent from the previous season's finale, the previous most-watched episode. The average gross viewing figure per episode for the show, which includes streaming, DVR recordings, and repeat showings, reached over 25 million for this season, and it was described as the last consensus show on television. The figure went up by 25 percent compared to the previous year, and viewing figures of the show for this season on its on-demand services HBO Now and HBO Go went up by over 90 percent, new records for HBO. Almost 40 percent of viewers watched this season on HBO digital platforms. The show also broke records on pay television channels in 2016 in the United Kingdom with an average audience of more than 5 million across all platforms and in Australia with a cumulative average audience of 1.2 million viewers.

Viewership and ratings per episode of Game of Thrones season 6
No.	Title	Air date	Rating (18–49)	Viewers (millions)	DVR (18–49)	DVR viewers (millions)	Total (18–49)	Total viewers (millions)
1	"The Red Woman"	April 24, 2016	4.0	7.94	1.0	2.11	5.0	10.06
2	"Home"	May 1, 2016	3.7	7.29	0.9	1.92	4.6	9.20^{1}
3	"Oathbreaker"	May 8, 2016	3.7	7.28	1.0	1.96	4.7	9.24^{1}
4	"Book of the Stranger"	May 15, 2016	3.9	7.82	1.1	2.22	5.0	10.05^{1}
5	"The Door"	May 22, 2016	4.0	7.89	1.4	2.76	5.4	10.65
6	"Blood of My Blood"	May 29, 2016	3.2	6.71	2.0	3.61	5.2	10.32
7	"The Broken Man"	June 5, 2016	3.9	7.80	1.5	2.81	5.4	10.61
8	"No One"	June 12, 2016	3.9	7.60	1.5	3.0	5.4	10.60
9	"Battle of the Bastards"	June 19, 2016	3.8	7.66	1.7	3.42	5.5	11.08
10	"The Winds of Winter"	June 26, 2016	4.3	8.89	1.6	3.19	5.9	12.08

^1 Live +7 ratings were not available, so Live +3 ratings have been used instead.

=== Accolades ===
For the 32nd TCA Awards, the series was nominated for Program of the Year and Outstanding Achievement in Drama. For the 68th Primetime Emmy Awards, the series received 23 nominations, the most of any series. It won 12 awards, including Outstanding Drama Series, David Benioff and D. B. Weiss for Outstanding Writing for a Drama Series for "Battle of the Bastards", and Miguel Sapochnik for Outstanding Directing for a Drama Series for "Battle of the Bastards". For the 7th Critics' Choice Television Awards, the series won for Best Drama Series.

Year	Award	Category	Nominee(s)	Result	Ref.
2016	AFI Awards	AFI TV Award	Game of Thrones	Won	
2016	32nd TCA Awards	Outstanding Achievement in Drama	Game of Thrones	Nominated	
2016	32nd TCA Awards	Program of the Year	Game of Thrones	Nominated	
2016	TV Choice Awards	Best International Show	Game of Thrones	Won	
2016	Dragon Awards	Best Science Fiction or Fantasy TV Series	Game of Thrones	Won	
2016	Gold Derby TV Awards 2016	Best Drama Series	Game of Thrones	Won	
2016	Gold Derby TV Awards 2016	Ensemble of the Year	The cast of Game of Thrones	Nominated	
2016	Gold Derby TV Awards 2016	Best Drama Supporting Actor	Kit Harington	Won	
2016	Gold Derby TV Awards 2016	Best Drama Supporting Actress	Lena Headey	Won	
2016	Gold Derby TV Awards 2016	Best Drama Guest Actor	Ian McShane	Nominated	
2016	Gold Derby TV Awards 2016	Best Drama Guest Actor	Max von Sydow	Nominated	
2016	Gold Derby TV Awards 2016	Best Drama Episode	"Battle of the Bastards"	Nominated	
2016	Gold Derby TV Awards 2016	Best Drama Episode	"The Winds of Winter"	Nominated	
2016	Artios Awards	Outstanding Achievement in Casting – Television Series Drama	Nina Gold, Robert Sterne, Carla Stronge	Nominated	
2016	EWwy Award	Best Supporting Actress, Drama	Sophie Turner	Won	
2016	68th Primetime Emmy Awards	Outstanding Drama Series	Game of Thrones	Won	
2016	68th Primetime Emmy Awards	Outstanding Supporting Actor in a Drama Series	Peter Dinklage as Tyrion Lannister	Nominated	
2016	68th Primetime Emmy Awards	Outstanding Supporting Actor in a Drama Series	Kit Harington as Jon Snow	Nominated	
2016	68th Primetime Emmy Awards	Outstanding Supporting Actress in a Drama Series	Emilia Clarke as Daenerys Targaryen	Nominated	
2016	68th Primetime Emmy Awards	Outstanding Supporting Actress in a Drama Series	Lena Headey as Cersei Lannister	Nominated	
2016	68th Primetime Emmy Awards	Outstanding Supporting Actress in a Drama Series	Maisie Williams as Arya Stark	Nominated	
2016	68th Primetime Emmy Awards	Outstanding Directing for a Drama Series	Jack Bender for "The Door"	Nominated	
2016	68th Primetime Emmy Awards	Outstanding Directing for a Drama Series	Miguel Sapochnik for "Battle of the Bastards"	Won	
2016	68th Primetime Emmy Awards	Outstanding Writing for a Drama Series	David Benioff and D. B. Weiss for "Battle of the Bastards"	Won	
2016	68th Primetime Creative Arts Emmy Awards	Outstanding Casting for a Drama Series	Nina Gold, Robert Sterne, and Carla Stronge	Won	
2016	68th Primetime Creative Arts Emmy Awards	Outstanding Guest Actor in a Drama Series	Max von Sydow as Three-Eyed Raven	Nominated	
2016	68th Primetime Creative Arts Emmy Awards	Outstanding Cinematography for a Single-Camera Series	Gregory Middleton for Home	Nominated	
2016	68th Primetime Creative Arts Emmy Awards	Outstanding Costumes for a Fantasy Series	Michele Clapton, Chloe Aubry, Sheena Wichary for The Winds of Winter	Won	
2016	68th Primetime Creative Arts Emmy Awards	Outstanding Hairstyling for a Single-Camera Series	Kevin Alexander, Candice Banks, Nicola Mount, Laura Pollock, Gary Machin, Rosalia Culora for The Door	Nominated	
2016	68th Primetime Creative Arts Emmy Awards	Outstanding Make-up for a Single-Camera Series (Non-Prosthetic)	Jane Walker, Kate Thompson, Nicola Mathews, Kay Bilk, Marianna Kyriacou, Pamela Smyth for "Battle of the Bastards"	Won	
2016	68th Primetime Creative Arts Emmy Awards	Outstanding Production Design for a Fantasy Program	Deborah Riley, Paul Ghirardani, Rob Cameron for Blood of My Blood, The Broken Man, and No One	Won	
2016	68th Primetime Creative Arts Emmy Awards	Outstanding Prosthetic Makeup for a Series	Jane Walker, Sarah Gower, Emma Sheffield, Tristan Versluis, Barrie Gower for The Door	Won	
2016	68th Primetime Creative Arts Emmy Awards	Outstanding Single-Camera Picture Editing for a Drama series	Tim Porter for Battle of the Bastards	Won	
2016	68th Primetime Creative Arts Emmy Awards	Outstanding Single-Camera Picture Editing for a Drama series	Katie Weiland for Oathbreaker	Nominated	
2016	68th Primetime Creative Arts Emmy Awards	Outstanding Sound Editing for a Series	Tim Kimmel, Tim Hands, Paul Bercovitch, Paula Fairfield, Bradley C. Katona, Michael Wabro, David Klotz, Brett Voss, Jeffrey Wilhoit, Dylan Tuomy-Wilhoit for The Door	Nominated	
2016	68th Primetime Creative Arts Emmy Awards	Outstanding Sound Mixing for a Series	Ronan Hill, Richard Dyer, Onnalee Blank, Mathew Waters for Battle of the Bastards	Won	
2016	68th Primetime Creative Arts Emmy Awards	Outstanding Special Visual Effects	Steve Kullback, Joe Bauer, Adam Chazen, Derek Spears, Eric Carney, Sam Conway, Matthew Rouleau, Michelle Blok, Glenn Melenhorst for Battle of the Bastards	Won	
2016	68th Primetime Creative Arts Emmy Awards	Outstanding Stunt Coordination for a Series	Rowley Irlam	Won	
2016	68th Primetime Creative Arts Emmy Awards	Outstanding Interactive Program	Game of Thrones Main Titles 360 Experience	Nominated	
2016	Hollywood Professional Alliance	Outstanding Sound	Tim Kimmel, Paula Fairfield, Mathew Waters, Onnalee Blank, Bradley Katona, Paul Bercovitch for "Battle of the Bastards"	Nominated	
2016	Hollywood Professional Alliance	Outstanding Editing	Tim Porter for "Battle of the Bastards"	Won	
2016	Hollywood Professional Alliance	Outstanding Visual Effects	Joe Bauer, Eric Carney, Derek Spears, Glenn Melenhorst, Matthew Rouleau for "Battle of the Bastards"	Won	
2016	Australian Production Design Guild	Production Design for a Television Drama	Deborah Riley	Won	
2016	Australian Production Design Guild	3D Award for Visual Effects Design	Iloura for "Battle of the Bastards"	Won	
2016	British Society of Cinematographers	Best Cinematography in a Television Drama	Fabian Wagner for "The Winds of Winter"	Nominated	
2016	British Society of Cinematographers	ACO/BSC/GBCT Operators TV Drama Award	Sean Savage, David Morgan & John Ferguson for "Battle of the Bastards"	Nominated	
2016	American Society of Cinematographers	Outstanding Achievement in Cinematography in Regular Series	Fabian Wagner for "Battle of the Bastards"	Won	
2016	American Society of Cinematographers	Outstanding Achievement in Cinematography in Regular Series	Anette Haellmigk for "Book of the Stranger"	Nominated	
2016	7th Critics' Choice Television Awards	Best Drama Series	Game of Thrones	Won	
2016	7th Critics' Choice Television Awards	Best Supporting Actor in a Drama Series	Peter Dinklage	Nominated	
2016	7th Critics' Choice Television Awards	Best Supporting Actor in a Drama Series	Kit Harington	Nominated	
2016	7th Critics' Choice Television Awards	Best Supporting Actress in a Drama Series	Emilia Clarke	Nominated	
2016	7th Critics' Choice Television Awards	Best Supporting Actress in a Drama Series	Lena Headey	Nominated	
2016	7th Critics' Choice Television Awards	Most Bingeworthy Show	Game of Thrones	Nominated	
2016	IGN Awards	Best TV Series	Game of Thrones	Nominated	
2016	IGN Awards	Best TV Episode	"The Winds of Winter"	Nominated	
2016	IGN Awards	Best TV Drama Series	Game of Thrones	Nominated	
2016	IGN People's Choice Award	Best TV Series	Game of Thrones	Won	
2016	IGN People's Choice Award	Best TV Episode	"The Winds of Winter"	Won	
2016	IGN People's Choice Award	Best TV Drama Series	Game of Thrones	Won	
2016	MTV Fandom Awards	Fan Freak Out of the Year	Game of Thrones – Resurrection of Jon Snow	Nominated	
2016	International Film Music Critics Association	Best Original Score for a Television Series	Ramin Djawadi	Won	
2016	International Film Music Critics Association	Film Music Composition Of The Year	Ramin Djawadi for "Light of the Seven"	Nominated	
2016	World Soundtrack Awards	Television Composer of the Year	Ramin Djawadi	Nominated	
2017	43rd People's Choice Awards	Favorite Premium Sci-Fi/Fantasy TV Show	Game of Thrones	Nominated	
2017	43rd People's Choice Awards	Favorite Sci-Fi/Fantasy TV Actress	Emilia Clarke	Nominated	
2017	44th Annie Awards	Outstanding Achievement, Character Animation in a Live Action Production	Nicholas Tripodi, Dean Elliott, James Hollingworth, Matt Weaver for "Battle of the Bastards"	Nominated	
2017	74th Golden Globe Awards	Best Television Series – Drama	Game of Thrones	Nominated	
2017	74th Golden Globe Awards	Best Supporting Actress – Series, Miniseries or Television Film	Lena Headey	Nominated	
2017	21st Satellite Awards	Best Supporting Actress – Series, Miniseries or Television Film	Lena Headey	Nominated	
2017	21st Satellite Awards	Best Television Series – Genre	Game of Thrones	Nominated	
2017	Writers Guild of America Awards 2016	Episodic Drama	David Benioff and D. B. Weiss for "The Winds of Winter"	Nominated	
2017	Writers Guild of America Awards 2016	Television Drama Series	David Benioff, Bryan Cogman, Dave Hill, D. B. Weiss	Nominated	
2017	23rd Screen Actors Guild Awards	Outstanding Performance by a Stunt Ensemble in a Drama Series	Boian Anev, Kristina Baskett, Rachelle Beinart, Richard Bradshaw, Michael Byrch, Nick Chopping, Christopher Cox, Jake Cox, David Cronnelly, Matt Crook, Levan Doran, Bradley Farmer, Vladimir Furdik, Richard Hansen, Rob Hayns, Paul Howell, Rowley Irlam, Erol Ismail, Milen Kaleychev, Leigh Maddern, Jonathan McBride, Leona McCarron, Kim McGarrity, Richard Mead, Casey Michaels, Sian Milne, David Newton, Jason Otelle, Radoslav Parvanov, Ian Pead, Rashid Phoenix, Andy Pilgrim, Marc Redmond, Paul Shapcott, Jonny Stockwell, Ryan Stuart, Edward Upcott, Leo Woodruff	Won	
2017	23rd Screen Actors Guild Awards	Outstanding Performance by An Ensemble in a Drama Series	Alfie Allen, Jacob Anderson, Dean Charles Chapman, Emilia Clarke, Nikolaj Coster-Waldau, Liam Cunnungham, Peter Dinklage, Nathalie Emmanuel, Kit Harington, Lena Headey, Conleth Hill, Kristofer Hivju, Michiel Huisman, Faye Marsay, Jonathan Pryce, Sophie Turner, Carcie Van Houten, Gemma Whelan, Maisie Williams,	Nominated	
2017	23rd Screen Actors Guild Awards	Outstanding Performance by a Male Actor in a Drama Series	Peter Dinklage	Nominated	
2017	American Cinema Editors Awards 2017	Best Edited One-Hour Series For Non-Commercial Television	Tim Porter for "Battle of the Bastards"	Won	
2017	Art Directors Guild Awards 2016	One-Hour Single Camera Period Or Fantasy Television Series	Deborah Riley for "Blood of My Blood", "The Broken Man" and "No One"	Nominated	
2017	Producers Guild of America Awards 2016	The Norman Felton Award for Outstanding Producer of Episodic Television, Drama	David Benioff, D. B. Weiss, Bernadette Caulfield, Frank Doelger, Carolyn Strauss, Bryan Cogman, Lisa McAtackney, Chris Newman, Greg Spence	Nominated	
2017	Visual Effects Society Awards 2016	Outstanding Visual Effects in a Photoreal Episode	Joe Bauer, Steve Kullback, Glenn Melenhorst, Matthew Rouleau, Sam Conway for "Battle of the Bastards"	Won	
2017	Visual Effects Society Awards 2016	Outstanding Animated Performance in an Episode or Real-Time Project	James Kinnings, Michael Holzl, Matt Derksen, Joseph Hoback for "Battle of the Bastards" – Drogon	Won	
2017	Visual Effects Society Awards 2016	Outstanding Animated Performance in an Episode or Real-Time Project	Sebastian Lauer, Jonathan Symmonds, Thomas Kutschera, Anthony Sieben for "Home" – Emaciated Dragon	Nominated	
2017	Visual Effects Society Awards 2016	Outstanding Created Environment in an Episode, Commercial or Real-Time Project	Deak Ferrand, Dominic Daigle, François Croteau, Alexandru Banuta for "Battle of the Bastards" – Meereen City	Won	
2017	Visual Effects Society Awards 2016	Outstanding Created Environment in an Episode, Commercial or Real-Time Project	Edmond Engelbrecht, Tomoka Matsumura, Edwin Holdsworth, Cheri Fojtik for "The Winds of Winter" – Citadel	Nominated	
2017	Visual Effects Society Awards 2016	Outstanding Virtual Cinematography in a Photoreal Project	Patrick Tiberius Gehlen, Michelle Blok, Christopher Baird, Drew Wood-Davies for "Battle of the Bastards"	Nominated	
2017	Visual Effects Society Awards 2016	Outstanding Effects Simulations in an Episode, Commercial, or Real-Time Project	Kevin Blom, Sasmit Ranadive, Wanghua Huang, Ben Andersen for "Battle of the Bastards"	Nominated	
2017	Visual Effects Society Awards 2016	Outstanding Effects Simulations in an Episode, Commercial, or Real-Time Project	Thomas Hullin, Dominik Kirouac, James Dong, Xavier Fourmond for "Battle of the Bastards" – Meereen City	Won	
2017	Visual Effects Society Awards 2016	Outstanding Compositing in a Photoreal Episode	Thomas Montminy-Brodeur, Patrick David, Michael Crane, Joe Salazar for "Battle of the Bastards" – Meereen City	Nominated	
2017	Visual Effects Society Awards 2016	Outstanding Compositing in a Photoreal Episode	Dominic Hellier, Morgan Jones, Thijs Noij, Caleb Thompson for "Battle of the Bastards" – Retaking Winterfell	Won	
2017	Visual Effects Society Awards 2016	Outstanding Compositing in a Photoreal Episode	Eduardo Díaz, Aníbal Del Busto, Angel Rico, Sonsoles López-Aranguren for "The Door" – Land of Always Winter	Nominated	
2017	Cinema Audio Society Awards	Outstanding Achievement in Sound Mixing – Television Series – One Hour	Ronan Hill, Onnalee Blank, Mathew Waters, Richard Dyer, Brett Voss for "Battle of the Bastards"	Won	
2017	69th Directors Guild of America Awards	Dramatic Series	Miguel Sapochnik for "Battle of the Bastards"	Won	
2017	USC Scripter Award	Best Adapted Screenplay	David Benioff and D. B. Weiss for "The Winds of Winter"	Nominated	
2017	Hollywood Makeup Artist and Hair Stylist Guild Awards	Best Period and/or Character Makeup – Television	Jane Walker, Kay Bilk	Won	
2017	Hollywood Makeup Artist and Hair Stylist Guild Awards	Best Period and/or Character Hair Styling – Television	Kevin Alexander, Candice Banks	Won	
2017	Hollywood Makeup Artist and Hair Stylist Guild Awards	Best Special Makeup Effects – Television	Barrie Gower, Sarah Gower	Nominated	
2017	Costume Designers Guild Awards	Outstanding Fantasy Television Series	Michele Clapton, April Ferry	Won	
2017	Dorian Awards	TV Drama of the Year	Game of Thrones	Nominated	
2017	22nd National Television Awards	Best Drama	Game of Thrones	Nominated	
2017	Golden Reel Awards	Best Sound Editing in Television, Short Form: FX/Foley	Tim Kimmel, Brett Voss, John Matter, Jeffrey Wilhoit, Dylan Wilhoit, Paula Fairfield and Bradley Katona for "Battle of the Bastards"	Nominated	
2017	Golden Reel Awards	Best Sound Editing in Television, Short Form: Dialogue / ADR	Tim Kimmel and Tim Hands for "Battle of the Bastards"	Nominated	
2017	Golden Reel Awards	Best Sound Editing in Television, Short Form: Music	David Klotz for "Battle of the Bastards"	Nominated	
2017	Society of Camera Operators Awards	Camera Operator of the Year – Television	Sean Savage	Nominated	
2017	Zulu Awards	Best Actor	Nikolaj Coster-Waldau	Nominated	
2017	Canadian Society of Cinematographers	TV series Cinematography	Gregory Middleton for "Home"	Won	
2017	Location Managers Guild Awards	LMGI Award for Outstanding Locations in Period Television	Matt Jones and Naomi Liston	Nominated	
2017	43rd Saturn Awards	Best Fantasy Television Series	Game of Thrones	Nominated	
2017	43rd Saturn Awards	Best Supporting Actor on Television	Kit Harington	Nominated	
2017	43rd Saturn Awards	Best Actress on Television	Lena Headey	Nominated	
2017	22nd Empire Awards	Best TV Series	Game of Thrones	Nominated	
2017	Irish Film & Television Academy	Best Television Drama	Game of Thrones	Nominated	
2017	Irish Film & Television Academy	Actor in a Supporting Role – Television	Liam Cunningham	Nominated	
2017	Irish Film & Television Academy	Best Sound	Game of Thrones	Nominated	
2017	Irish Film & Television Academy	Best VFX	Game of Thrones	Nominated	
2017	Webby Award	Best Overall Social Presence	Game of Thrones	Won	
2017	Webby Award	Unscripted (Branded)	"Battle of the Bastards" Featurette	Won	
2017	Hugo Award	Best Dramatic Presentation, Short Form	David Benioff (writer), D. B. Weiss (writer), and Miguel Sapochnik (director) for "Battle of the Bastards"	Nominated	
2017	Hugo Award	Best Dramatic Presentation, Short Form	David Benioff (writer), D. B. Weiss (writer), and Jack Bender (director) for "The Door"	Nominated	
2017	2017 MTV Movie & TV Awards	Show Of The Year	Game of Thrones	Nominated	
2017	2017 MTV Movie & TV Awards	Best Actor In A Show	Emilia Clarke	Nominated	
2017	2017 MTV Movie & TV Awards	Tearjerker	Hodor's (Kristian Nairn) Death	Nominated	
2017	2017 British Academy Television Awards	Must-See Moment	"Battle of the Bastards"	Nominated	
2017	Glamour Awards	Best UK TV Actress	Sophie Turner	Won	

== Release ==
The season was simulcast around the world by HBO and its broadcast partners. In some countries, it aired the day after its first release. By the end of 2016, the sixth season of Game of Thrones became the most-pirated TV series of the year.

=== Marketing ===
In November 2015, a teaser poster displaying Jon Snow was released on the official Game of Thrones Twitter account. A 41-second teaser trailer was released in early December, featuring Jon Snow from the fifth season episode "Hardhome", many of the previous seasons' highlights, and voice-overs from Max von Sydow as the Three-Eyed Raven and Isaac Hempstead Wright as Bran Stark. The first footage from the season was revealed in a new promotional video released shortly afterward by HBO highlighting its new and returning original shows for the coming year, showcasing scenes involving Daenerys Targaryen, Ramsay Bolton, Cersei Lannister, and Tommen Baratheon. On December 28, 2015, Entertainment Weekly released its "Exclusive First Look" issue, featuring an image of Bran Stark, who had shorter hair and was noticeably older from his last appearance in season four.

In January 2016, three teaser trailers were released, with each teaser depicting the banners of the houses Targaryen, Lannister, and Stark and which included voice-overs by Iwan Rheon as Ramsay Bolton, Jonathan Pryce as The High Sparrow, and an unknown character speaking in Dothraki. The following month, HBO released 28 exclusive photos from the sixth season, picturing several of the main characters during the season and confirming the fates of Theon, Sansa, and Myrcella, while Jon Snow was notably absent. HBO released a teaser trailer on February 14, 2016, that shows the faces of a number of living as well as deceased characters such as Ned Stark, Robb Stark, Catelyn Stark, Joffrey Baratheon, Tywin Lannister, Stannis Baratheon, Ygritte, and, controversially, Jon Snow in the House of Black and White. Later that month, HBO released 16 character posters of both deceased and living characters and two official posters featuring various characters.

A behind-the-scenes video of the sixth season was released at the end of February, focusing on camera operators working on the show. The first official trailer for season 6 was released on March 8, 2016. Another behind-the-scenes video was released almost a month later, focusing on the creative process of prosthetics, specifically the White Walkers. The video also contained new footage of White Walkers from the sixth season. On March 24, Entertainment Weekly revealed a series of new issues titled "Dame of Thrones", featuring six of the female lead characters from the series and a focus on the sixth season. Shortly afterward, HBO released new photos from season six and a new promo named "March Madness", with new footage. After the screening of the season premiere, "The Red Woman", HBO released a second official trailer. In July, HBO released a blooper reel online.

=== After the Thrones ===
After the Thrones, a live aftershow in which hosts Andy Greenwald and Chris Ryan discussed episodes of the series, aired on the stand-alone streaming service HBO Now on the Monday following each episode of the show's sixth season.

=== Home media ===
The season was released on Blu-ray and DVD on November 15, 2016. The set includes extra background, behind-the-scenes material, and deleted scenes.

Game of Thrones: The Complete Sixth Season
Set details	Special features	
Format: AC-3, Blu-ray, DTS Surround Sound, Dubbed, NTSC, Subtitled, Widescreen; Language: English, French, Castilian, German; Subtitles: English, French, Castilian, German, Dutch, Danish, Finnish, Greek, Hebrew, Norwegian, Portuguese, Romanian, Swedish, Turkish; 16:9 aspect ratio; 5-disc set, 10 episodes	"18 Hours At The Paint Hall": Shows how and where the season was filmed.; "The Battle Of The Bastards": Behind-the-scenes on the various production challenges of the sixth season.; "Recreating The Dothraki World": Showcases the creation of Vaes Dothrak, 13 audio commentaries by, among others, Benioff, Weiss, Dinklage, Headey, Harington, Coster-Waldau, Turner and more.; Blu-ray exclusive: "In-Episode Guide": In-feature resource that provides background information about several characters and locations.; "Histories & Lore": The mythology of Westeros as told by the characters themselves. Also includes 8 history pieces.	
DVD release dates
Region 1	Region 2	Region 4
November 15, 2016	November 14, 2016	November 16, 2016
