= Home (Game of Thrones) =

- Game of Thrones episode
- Episode no.: Season 6 Episode 2
- Directed by: Jeremy Podeswa
- Written by: Dave Hill
- Cinematography by: Gregory Middleton
- Editing by: Crispin Green
- Original air date: May 1, 2016
- Running time: 53 minutes

Guest appearances
- Max von Sydow as the Three-eyed raven; Patrick Malahide as Balon Greyjoy; Owen Teale as Alliser Thorne; Ben Crompton as Eddison Tollett; Pilou Asbæk as Euron Greyjoy; Michael Feast as Aeron Greyjoy; Jacob Anderson as Grey Worm; Gemma Whelan as Yara Greyjoy; Kristian Nairn as Hodor; Sam Coleman as Young Hodor; Faye Marsay as the Waif; Ellie Kendrick as Meera Reed; Daniel Portman as Podrick Payne; Ian Whyte as Wun Wun; Kae Alexander as Leaf; Hafþór Júlíus Björnsson as Gregor Clegane; Elizabeth Webster as Walda Bolton; Dylan Edwards as a King's Landing boaster; Richard Rycroft as Maester Wolkan; Paul Rattray as Harald Karstark; Brenock O'Connor as Olly; Nell Tiger Free as Myrcella Baratheon; Annette Tierney as Nan; Fergus Leathem as Rodrik Cassel; Richard Laing as a Lannister captain; Sebastian Croft as Young Eddard Stark; Cordelia Hill as Young Lyanna Stark; Matteo Elezi as Young Benjen Stark; Michael Hayes as a Young Brandon Stark; Brian Fortune as Othell Yarwyck; Michael Condron as Bowen Marsh

Episode chronology
← Previous "The Red Woman"	Next → "Oathbreaker"
- Game of Thrones season 6

"Home" is the second episode of the sixth season of HBO's fantasy television series Game of Thrones, and the 52nd overall. The episode was written by Dave Hill and directed by Jeremy Podeswa.

In the episode, the Wildlings arrive at Castle Black and force Alliser Thorne and his allies to surrender, allowing Melisandre to resurrect Jon Snow. Ramsay Bolton seizes Winterfell and the North for himself; Tyrion Lannister unchains the dragons being held in the catacombs of Meereen; Arya Stark proceeds to the next step in her training; and Bran Stark sees the past.

"Home" received high praise from critics, citing the final scene which sees the return of Jon Snow, the reintroduction of Bran Stark with the Three-eyed Raven, and the unexpected death of Roose Bolton, as high points in the episode. In the United States, the episode premiere achieved a viewership of 7.29 million in its initial broadcast. The episode earned a nomination at the 68th Primetime Emmy Awards for Outstanding Cinematography for a Single-Camera Series.

== Plot ==
=== Beyond the Wall ===
Bran Stark trains with the Three-eyed Raven. He has a vision of a young Eddard, Benjen, and Lyanna Stark in Winterfell, and learns Hodor's real name, Wylis. The Three-eyed Raven pulls Bran out of the memory, warning him that he risks "drowning" in old memories. Leaf, a Child of the Forest, tells Meera Reed that Bran will soon need Meera's help.

=== In the North ===
Ramsay deduces Sansa would seek Jon's protection and proposes to storm Castle Black. Roose warns Ramsay such action would turn the entire North against the Boltons. Ramsay learns Roose's wife Walda has given birth to a son, and kills his father, then has Walda and her child mauled to death by his hounds.

Continuing north, Sansa learns Brienne saw Arya alive. Confident that Brienne and Podrick can protect Sansa, Theon states that he intends to return "home".

=== In King's Landing ===
As Myrcella's body lies in state, Jaime is approached by the High Sparrow. Jaime threatens the High Sparrow over Cersei's treatment: the High Sparrow responds that the Faith Militant has the power to "overthrow an empire". Tommen forbids Cersei to leave the Red Keep for Myrcella's funeral, but he later apologizes to her and asks her to teach him how to be strong.

=== On the Iron Islands ===
Balon Greyjoy is assassinated by his brother Euron, who throws him off a bridge. Yara Greyjoy swears vengeance, but is reminded by her uncle Aeron, a priest, that Balon's successor depends on the Kingsmoot, a ceremony where the Ironborn choose their leader.

=== In Braavos ===
Arya duels the Waif, performing poorly. Jaqen H'ghar appears and tempts Arya with food, bedding, and the return of her vision. Arya refuses Jaqen's offers, and Jaqen tells Arya to follow him, saying she need no longer live on the streets.

=== In Meereen ===
Tyrion learns that Astapor and Yunkai have been retaken by the slavers. Knowing that they need the dragons to defend Meereen, Tyrion heads to Viserion and Rhaegal's chamber, where the dragons allow him to undo their shackles.

=== At the Wall ===
Davos and the loyalists guarding Jon's body prepare to make a last stand against Thorne and his allies, but before a fight can begin, Edd returns with an army of Wildlings. The mutineers surrender and are locked in the cells on Edd's orders. Davos pleads with Melisandre to attempt to resurrect Jon. Though Melisandre's faith has been shattered by Stannis' defeat, she attempts a ritual: seemingly unsuccessful, she, Tormund, Edd and Davos leave the room, but shortly afterwards, Jon awakens.

== Production ==
=== Writing ===
"Home" was written by Dave Hill. Some elements in the episode are based on the sixth novel in the A Song of Ice and Fire series, The Winds of Winter, which author George R. R. Martin had hoped to have completed before the sixth season began airing. It also contains elements from the chapters "The Blind Girl", "The Dragontamer", and "Bran III" from A Dance with Dragons, as well as the death of Balon Greyjoy, an event referenced in "Catelyn V" in A Storm of Swords but unseen by the reader.

In the "Inside the Episode" segment published by HBO shortly after the airing of the episode, the creators of the series and showrunners David Benioff and D. B. Weiss spoke about the Winterfell scene involving Bran, stating that they had an aversion from the start of the series towards doing any sort of flashback. As such, they decided to keep it to a minimum, with only one flashback, in the fifth-season premiere "The Wars to Come", in the entire series prior to the sixth season. However, Benioff and Weiss decided that the re-introduction of Bran and the Three-Eyed Raven would provide the narrative ability to show a flashback, by that providing a better understanding for both the characters and the viewers.

=== Casting ===
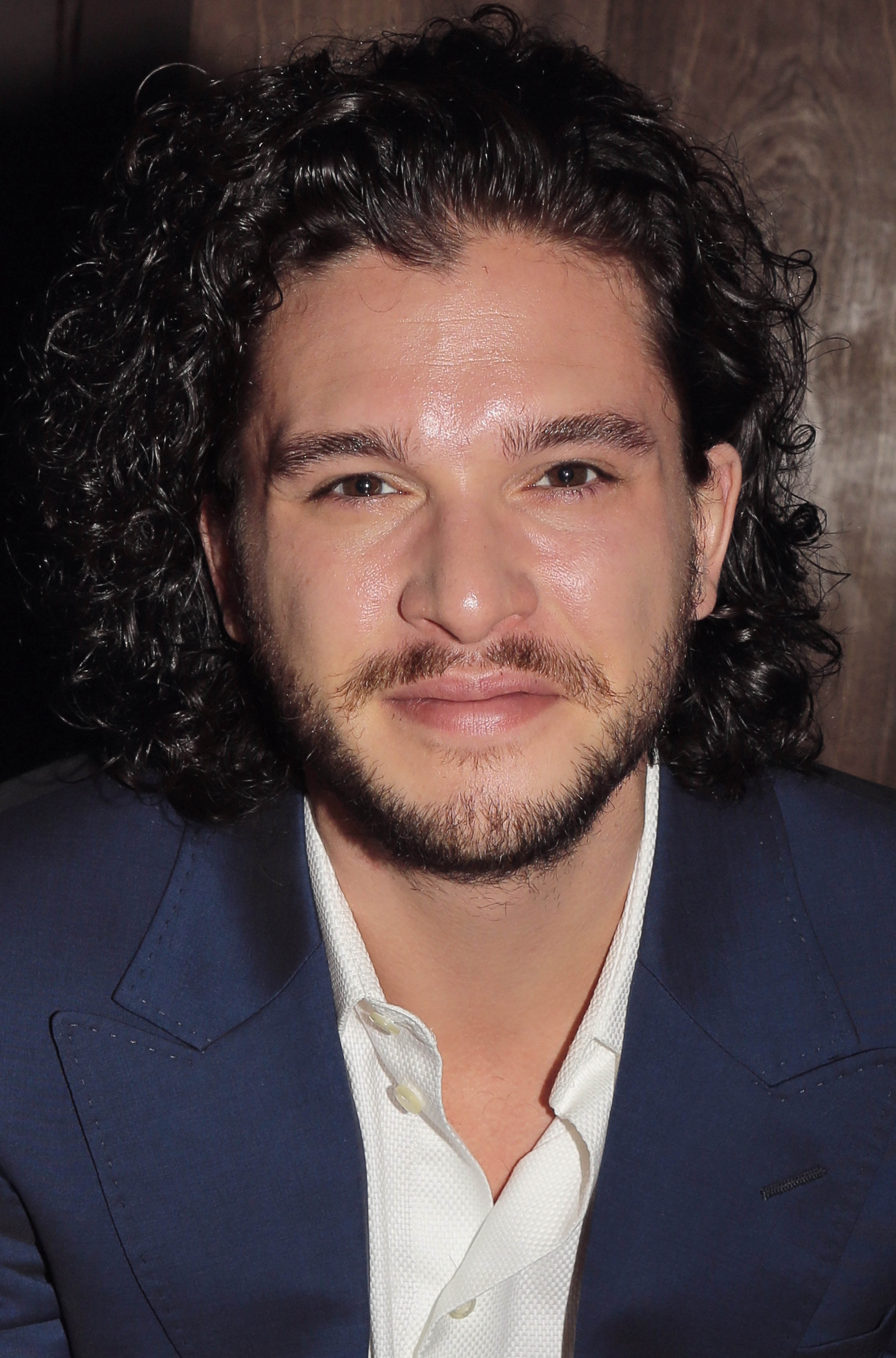
Kit Harington portrays Jon Snow in the series.

Isaac Hempstead-Wright (Bran Stark), Ellie Kendrick (Meera Reed), Kristian Nairn (Hodor), Gemma Whelan (Yara Greyjoy) and Patrick Malahide (Balon Greyjoy) made return appearances after an absence of several years. The episode introduced Max von Sydow as the Three-Eyed Raven, replacing Struan Rodger, who briefly portrayed the character in Season 4, and Pilou Asbaek as Euron Greyjoy. Several child actors were cast as young versions of well-known characters for Bran's vision of Winterfell in the past. These included Sebastian Croft as young Ned Stark, Cordelia Hill as young Lyanna Stark, Matteo Elezi as young Benjen Stark and Sam Coleman as young Hodor, or Wyllis as he is referred to in the scene.

Jon Snow was killed in the fifth-season finale, "Mother's Mercy", and in the lead up to the sixth season, actor Kit Harington, who portrays the character, stated that he would not be returning to the series except to play a corpse, and would not be resurrected despite rampant speculation. Following the airing of "Home", Harington issued a public apology to fans of the show, stating that he would "like to say sorry for lying to everyone. I'm glad that people were upset that he died. I think my biggest fear was that people were not going to care. Or it would just be, 'Fine, Jon Snow's dead.' But it seems like people had a, similar to the Red Wedding episode, kind of grief about it. Which means something I'm doing—or the show is doing—is right." Harington was simply referred to as "LC", for Lord Commander, in all scripts, call sheets, props or wardrobe materials, in order to maintain the secrecy involved with his eventual resurrection in the episode. It was also revealed that during production of the season, even verbal communication of the name 'Jon Snow' was disallowed, except in on-camera dialogue.

=== Filming ===
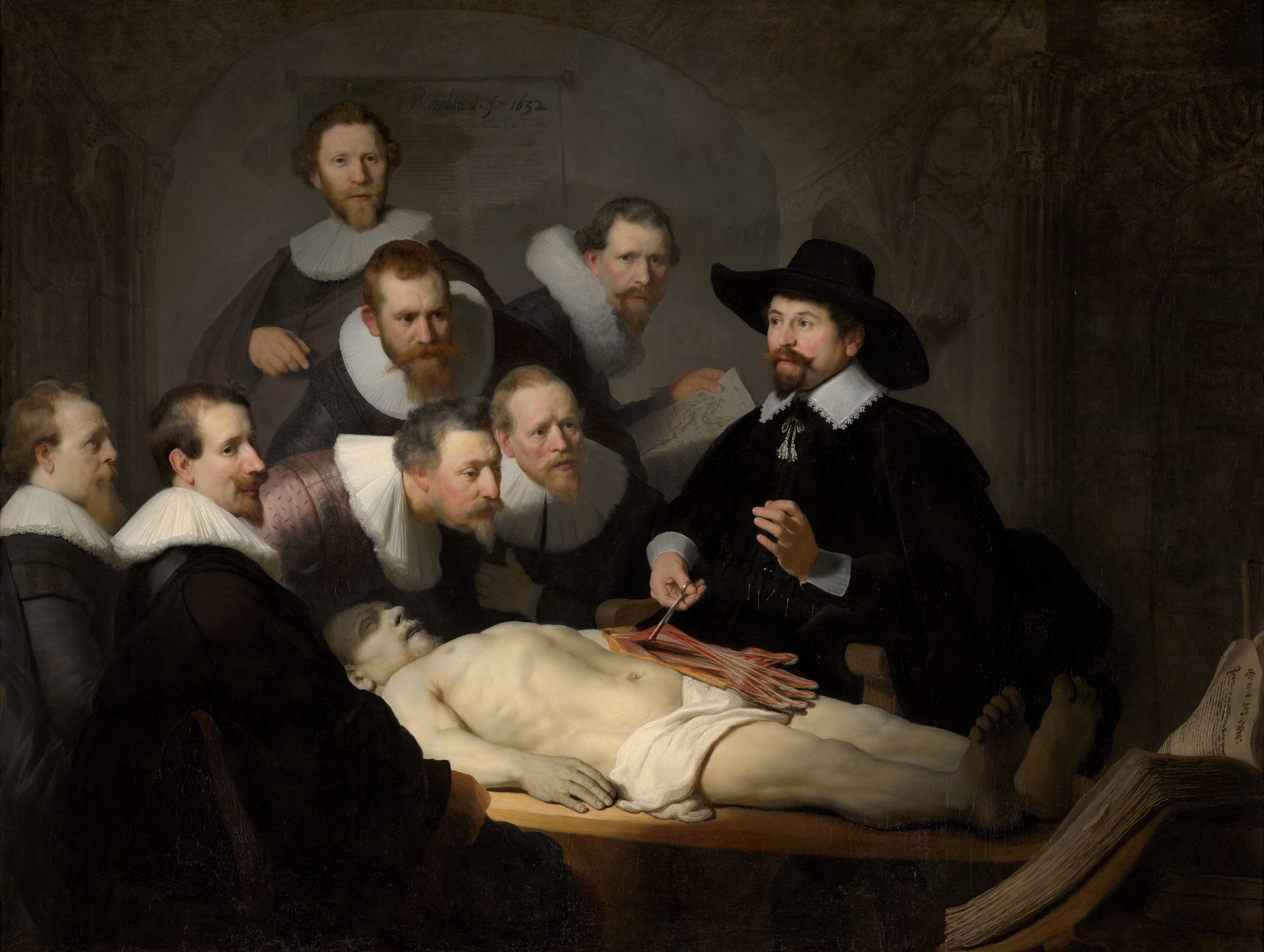
Director Jeremy Podeswa stated that he took inspiration from The Anatomy Lesson by Rembrandt for Jon Snow's resurrection scene.

"Home" was directed by Jeremy Podeswa. He had previously directed the fifth season episodes "Kill the Boy" and "Unbowed, Unbent, Unbroken".

In an interview following the airing of the episode, Podeswa stated about the scene in which Jon Snow is resurrected; "I think just establishing the right amount of tension through the scene, so you really didn't know up until the last second which way it was going to go. That was the biggest thing, creating a sense of mystery and magic around the whole thing. We really wanted that scene to be very beautiful, but also fraught with tension. That's the main thing we were looking for." Podeswa also compared how he shot the scene to The Anatomy Lesson of Dr. Nicolaes Tulp by Rembrandt, continuing, "It had a very rich, textual, moody, atmospheric quality. I think we were all in that space for a long time for this scene — while we were shooting all the scenes involving Jon Snow's body, really, but particularly the one where he's resurrected." In another interview Podeswa described how the resurrection would play out on screen, noting "There was much discussion about what that actually was: There's this sense of rebirth and whether it should be a big moment or a small moment. We tried a lot of different things, but it really felt to me, and I think we all agreed, this first gasp of life, like what a baby has when it's born, is kind of what it needed to be. And I just thought he did that so great."

Carice van Houten, who portrayed Melisandre, spoke about the resurrection, and how it was directed, mentioning "It was such an important scene, we shot it from so many angles. I think I washed his body 50 times."

== Reception ==
=== Ratings ===
"Home" was viewed by 7.29 million American households on its initial screening on HBO, which was slightly lower than the 7.94 million viewers for the sixth-season premiere, but which still made it the fourth highest rated episode of the series to that point. The episode also acquired a 3.67 rating in the 18–49 demographic, making it the highest rated show on cable television of the night. In the United Kingdom, the episode was viewed by 2.482 million viewers on Sky Atlantic; it also received 0.079 million timeshift viewers.

=== Critical reception ===
"Home" received highly positive reactions from critics, with many focusing on the resurrection of Jon Snow by Melisandre, which had been predicted by many, as well as new developments related to Bran Stark and the surprising death of Roose Bolton at the hands of his son, Ramsay. Review aggregator Rotten Tomatoes surveyed 50 reviews of the episode and judged 87% of them to be positive, with an average rating of 7.9/10. The website's consensus for the episode stated "Full of new revelation and one very anticipated resurrection, "Home" is a slow burn that finally sets the last pieces in play for a thrilling season six."

Matt Fowler of IGN stated "'Home' was a super busy episode, but also one that didn't feel rushed. Two big lords of the realm fell while a new Iron Island character was introduced and a character we all worried about got brought back to life by an unsure-but-well-meaning priestess. Story flowed here like wine in a very satisfying chapter filled with death and resurrection." Fowler gave the episode a 9.3 out of 10. Reviewing for The A.V. Club, from the perspective of book readers, Myles McNutt gave the episode an A−. McNutt also wrote about the showrunners going back to yet to be used story lines from the books, and transposing them into later seasons, such as the Kingsmoot plot, noting "It's a great example of the show's ability to adapt the books in a non-linear fashion, here wholesale moving a storyline where it serves a clearer purpose."

With respect to Jon Snow's resurrection, Jeremy Egner of The New York Times wrote that it was "a mostly perfunctory resolution." He said "Jon Snow's assassination was astonishing immediately when it happened but, upon further consideration, seemed destined to be overturned on magical appeal. There were too many questions (his parentage) and teased confrontations (the White Walkers) that would be left unresolved, and the show's entire Wall story line would be left with a bastard-sized hole in the middle." Egner also referred to the previous plot in the show involving Beric Dondarrion and Thoros of Myr, and speculated what it could mean in regards to Jon Snow's personality being changed, or becoming less of his former self, as with Dondarrion. Sarah Larson of The New Yorker also reviewed the episode positively, saying, "Last night's episode, still catching us up on all the characters while continuing to move its armies of plot lines forward, was full of fratricide, patricide, head-crushing, infanticide, trompe-l'oeil eyeballs, eunuch jokes, and glorious returns."

=== Accolades ===
Year	Award	Category	Nominee(s)	Result	Ref.
2016	Primetime Creative Arts Emmy Awards	Outstanding Cinematography for a Single-Camera Series	Gregory Middleton	Nominated	
2016	MTV Fandom Awards	Fan Freak Out of the Year	Game of Thrones - Resurrection of Jon Snow	Nominated	
2017	Visual Effects Society Awards 2016	Outstanding Animated Performance in an Episode or Real-Time Project	Sebastian Lauer, Jonathan Symmonds, Thomas Kutschera, Anthony Sieben – Dragon	Nominated	
2017	Canadian Society of Cinematographers	TV series Cinematography	Gregory Middleton	Won	
