= Alpha Blondy discography =

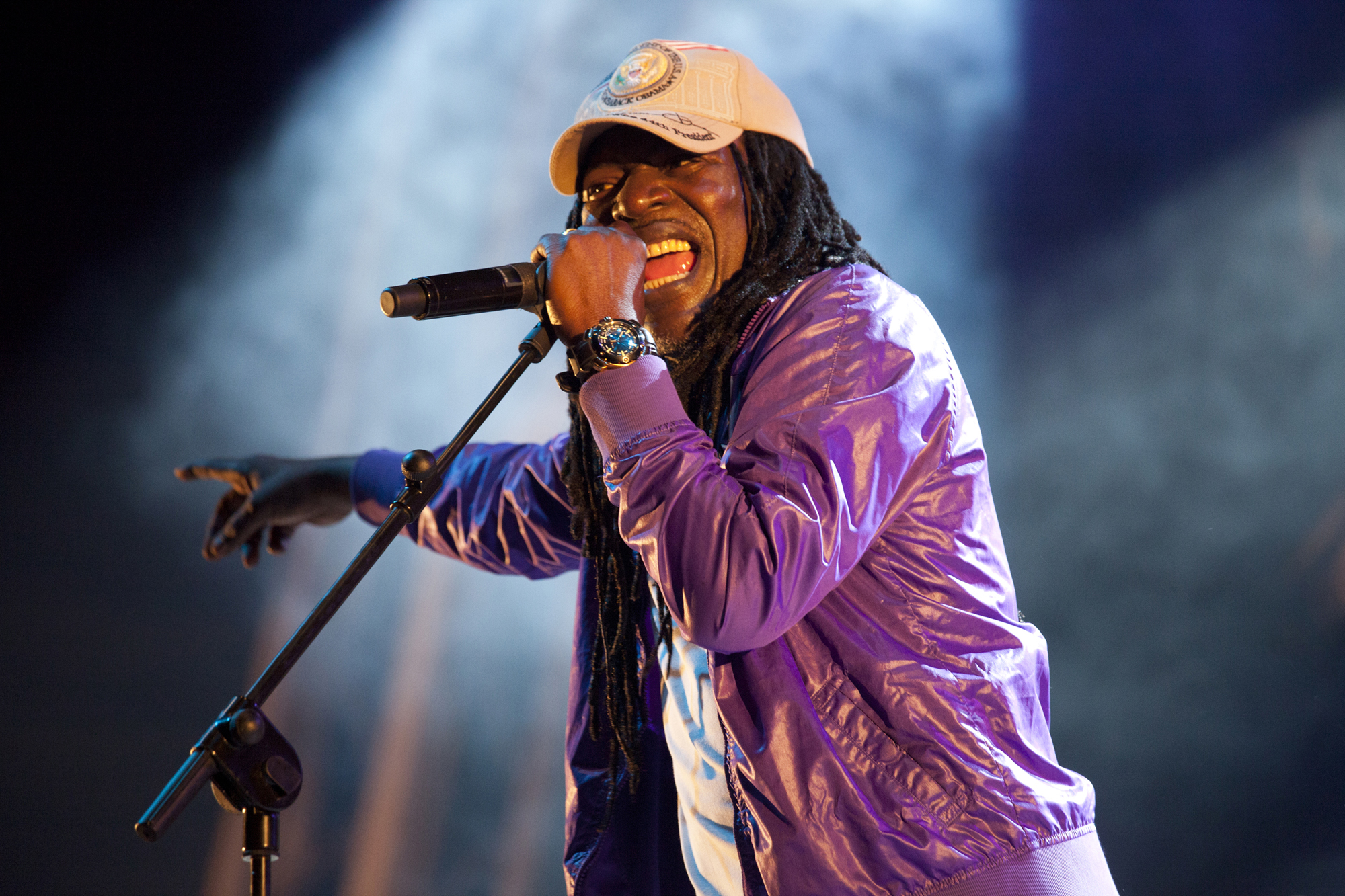
- Alpha Blondy in Barcelona, Spain (2010)
- Studio albums: 17
- Live albums: 2
- Compilation albums: 8
- Singles: 16
- Music videos: 15

The discography of the Ivorian reggae artist Alpha Blondy consists of fifteen studio albums, two live albums, eight compilation albums, and sixteen singles.

== Albums ==
=== Studio albums ===
List of studio albums, with selected chart positions and certifications
Title	Album details	Peak chart positions					Certifications
Title	Album details	BE	AUT	FRA	SWI	US	Certifications
Jah Glory!	Released: 1982; Label: Syllart Production; Format: LP	—	—	—	—	—	
Cocody Rock!!!	Released: 1984; Label: Pathé Marconi EMI; Format: LP	—	—	—	—	—	
Apartheid Is Nazism	Released: 1985; Label: Pathé; Format: LP	—	—	—	—	—	
Jérusalem	Released: 1986; Label: Pathé Marconi EMI; Format: LP	—	—	—	—	—	
Revolution	Released: 1987; Label: Pathé; Format: LP	—	—	—	—	—	
The Prophets	Released: 1989; Label: Pathé; Format: LP	—	—	—	—	—	
S.O.S Guerre Tribale	Released: 1991; Label: Jimmy's International Production; Format: LP, CD	—	—	—	—	—	
Masada	Released: 1992; Label: EMI France; Format: LP, CD	—	—	—	—	—	
Dieu	Released: 1994; Label: EMI France; Format: CD	—	27	—	—	15	
Grand Bassam Zion Rock	Released: 1996; Label: EMI; Format: CD	—	44	—	—	—	
Yitzhak Rabin	Released: 1998; Label: Une Musique; Format: CD	—	—	28	—	9	
Elohim	Released: 2000; Label: Deelie; Formats: CD	—	—	20	93	—	
Merci	Released: 2002; Label: Shanachie; Formats: Double CD	—	66	89	—	—	
Jah Victory	Released: 2007; Label: Mediacom; Formats: CD	—	—	59	—	—	
Vision	Released: 2011; Label: Wagram Music; Formats: CD	—	—	38	—	—	UPFI: Gold
Mystic Power	Released: 2013; Label: VP Records; Formats: CD	133	—	60	—	—	
Positive Energy	Released: 8 May 2015; Label: Wagram Music; Formats: CD	—	—	60	—	—	
Human Race	Released: 31 Aug 2018; Label: Wagram Music / W Lab; Formats: Digital & CD	—	—	-	—	—	
"—" denotes releases that did not chart.

=== Live albums ===
List of live albums, with selected chart positions and certifications
Title	Album details	Peak chart positions					Certifications
Title	Album details	AUT	BE	FRA	SWI	US	Certifications
Live Au Zenith	Released: 1993; Label: EMI France; Format: CD, cassette	—	—	—	—	—	
Paris Bercy	Released: 1995; Label: EMI France; Format: Double CD, Double LP	—	—	—	—	—	
"—" denotes releases that did not chart.

=== Compilation albums ===
List of compilation albums, with selected chart positions and certifications
Title	Album details	Peak chart positions					Certifications
Title	Album details	AUT	BE	FRA	SWI	US	Certifications
The Best Of Alpha Blondy	Released: 1990; Label: Shanachie Records; Format: LP, cassette, CD	—	—	—	—	—	
Rasta Poué / Jah Glory!	Released: 1995; Label: Syllart Production; Format: CD	—	—	—	—	—	
The Best Of Alpha Blondy	Released: 1996; Label: EMI France; Format: CD, cassette	—	—	—	—	—	
The Very Best Of Alpha Blondy	Released: 1997; Label: Une Musique; Format: CD	—	—	—	—	—	
Cocody Rock!!! / Apartheid Is Nazism	Released: 2003; Label: EMI France; Format: Double CD	—	—	—	—	—	
L'Essentiel	Released: 2004; Label: Capitol Records; Format: CD	—	—	—	—	—	
Radical Roots From The Emperor Of African Reggae	Released: 28 June 2004; Label: Manteca; Format: CD	—	—	—	—	—	
Akwaba, The Very Best of Alpha Blondy	Released: 5 July 2005; Label: EMI; Format: CD	—	—	—	—	—	
"—" denotes releases that did not chart.

== Singles ==
Title	Year	Peak chart positions					Certifications	Album
Title	Year	AUT	BE	FRA	SWI	US	Certifications	Album
"Brigadier Sabari (Opération Coup De Poing)"	1982	—	—	—	—	—		Jah Glory!
"Rasta Poué"	1983	—	—	—	—	—		Non-album single
"Cocody Rock!!!"	1984	—	—	—	—	—		Cocody Rock!!!
"Apartheid Is Nazism"	1985	—	—	—	—	—		Apartheid Is Nazism
"Travailler C'est Trop Dur"	1986	—	—	—	—	—		Jérusalem
"Sweet Fanta Diallo"	1987	—	—	—	—	—		Revolution
"Banana"	1989	—	—	—	—	—		The Prophets
"Yéyé Remix"	1992	—	—	—	—	—		Masada
"Rendez-Vous"	1992	—	—	—	—	—		Masada
"Heal Me"	1994	—	—	—	—	—		Dieu
"Ya Fohi"	1996	—	—	—	—	—		Grand Bassam Zion Rock
"New Dawn"	1998	—	—	—	—	—		Yitzhak Rabin
"Journalistes En Danger (Démocrature)"	1999	—	—	—	—	—		Elohim
"Yana De Fohi"	2005	—	—	—	—	—		Akwaba
"Jah Victory"	2007	—	—	—	—	—		Jah Victory
"Vuvuzela"	2007	—	—	—	—	—		Vision
"—" denotes a recording that did not chart.

== Music videos ==
Year	Title
1986	"Jérusalem"
1987	"Sweet Fanta Diallo"
1989	"Coup d'Etat"
1989	"Banana"
1992	"Rendez-vous"
1994	"Heal Me"
1996	"Ya Fohi"
1996	"Mystère naturel"
1996	"Valérie"
1998	"New Dawn"
2007	"Bahia"
2011	"Vuvuzela"
2013	"My American Dream"
2013	"J'ai Tué Le Commissaire"
2015	"No Brain, No Headache"
