= Positive energy =

Positive energy may refer to:

- Positive energy theorem, a collection of foundational results in general relativity and differential geometry
- Positive Energy (album), a 2015 album by Alpha Blondy and the Solar System
- Positive energy (China), an expression commonly used in Chinese political discourse
- Positive energy district, an urban area that produces at least as much energy on an annual basis as it consumes
