= Artificial intelligence in government =

Artificial intelligence (AI) has a range of uses in government. It can be used to further public policy objectives (in areas such as emergency services, health and welfare), as well as assist the public to interact with the government (through the use of virtual assistants, for example). According to the Harvard Business Review, "Applications of artificial intelligence to the public sector are broad and growing, with early experiments taking place around the world." Hila Mehr from the Ash Center for Democratic Governance and Innovation at Harvard University notes that AI in government is not new, with postal services using machine methods in the late 1990s to recognise handwriting on envelopes to automatically route letters. The use of AI in government comes with significant benefits, including efficiencies resulting in cost savings (for instance by reducing the number of front office staff) and reducing the opportunities for corruption. However, it also carries risks (described below).

== Uses of AI in government ==
The potential uses of AI in government are wide and varied, with Deloitte considering that "Cognitive technologies could eventually revolutionize every facet of government operations". Mehr suggests that six types of government problems are appropriate for AI applications:

1. Resource allocation—such as where administrative support is required to complete tasks more quickly.
2. Large datasets—where these are too large for employees to work efficiently and multiple datasets could be combined to provide greater insights.
3. Expert shortage—including where basic questions could be answered and niche issues can be learned.
4. Predictable scenario—historical data makes the situation predictable.
5. Procedural tasks refer to repetitive tasks in which the answers to inputs or outputs are binary.
6. Diverse data—where data takes various forms (such as visual and linguistic) and needs to be summarized regularly.

Mehr states that "While applications of AI in government work have not kept pace with the rapid expansion of AI in the private sector, the potential use cases in the public sector mirror common applications in the private sector."

Potential and actual uses of AI in government can be divided into three broad categories: those that contribute to public policy objectives, those that assist public interactions with the government, and other uses.

=== Contributing to public policy objectives ===
There are a range of examples of where AI can contribute to public policy objectives. These include:

- Receiving benefits at job loss, retirement, bereavement and child birth almost immediately, in an automated way (thus without requiring any actions from citizens at all)
- Social insurance service provision
- Classifying emergency calls based on their urgency (like the system used by the Cincinnati Fire Department in the United States)
- Detecting and preventing the spread of diseases
- Assisting public servants in making welfare payments and immigration decisions
- Adjudicating bail hearings
- Triaging health care cases
- Monitoring social media for public feedback on policies
- Monitoring social media to identify emergency situations
- Identifying fraudulent benefits claims
- Predicting a crime and recommending optimal police presence
- Predicting traffic congestion and car accidents
- Anticipating road maintenance requirements
- Identifying breaches of health regulations
- Providing personalised education to students
- Marking exam papers
- Assisting with defence and national security (see Artificial intelligence § Military and Applications of artificial intelligence § Other fields in which AI methods are implemented respectively)

Artificial Intelligence in China has been used to drive both political and economic markets. In 2019, Shanghai’s government rolled out 100 billion yuan to assist in funding enterprises that used AI to introduce 22 new policy agendas. Shanghai invested in these enterprises to attract top international talent in order to set up the Shanghai Municipal Big Data Center. City Brain AI is an urban management platform made by Alibaba. China uses City Brain AI to maintain a significant share of capital investment through public and state owned enterprises. The synergy between public and private sectors are more than capital-driven with City Brain AI. The blend of both public and private shareholding is only made out to be through the role of provincial and sub-provincial governments. Both hold control over the direction that City Brain AI makes both socially and economically.

=== Assisting public interactions with government ===
AI can be used to assist members of the public to interact with government and access government services, for example by:

- Answering questions using virtual assistants or chatbots (see below)
- Directing requests to the appropriate area within government
- Filling out forms
- Assisting with searching documents (e.g. IP Australia's trade mark search)
- Scheduling appointments

Various governments, including those of Australia and Estonia, have implemented virtual assistants to aid citizens in navigating services, with applications ranging from tax inquiries to life-event registrations.

=== Gerrymandering ===
Gerrymandering is a method of influencing political process by drawing map boundaries in favor of incumbent parties. Academic researchers Wendy Tam Cho and Bruce Cain have proposed partially automating the map-drawing process with an AI system to reduce partisan gerrymandering. Even with this AI system, the process may still be manipulated to favor partisan interests, so the researchers emphasized the importance of transparency and human involvement.

=== Other uses ===
Other uses of AI in government include:

- Translation
- Language interpretation pioneered by the European Commission's Directorate General for Interpretation and Florika Fink-Hooijer.
- Drafting documents

== Potential benefits ==
AI offers potential efficiencies and cost savings for the government. For example, Deloitte has estimated that automation could save US Government employees between 96.7 million to 1.2 billion hours a year, resulting in potential savings of between $3.3 billion to $41.1 billion a year. The Harvard Business Review has stated that while this may lead a government to reduce employee numbers, "Governments could instead choose to invest in the quality of its services. They can re-employ workers' time towards more rewarding work that requires lateral thinking, empathy, and creativity—all things at which humans continue to outperform even the most sophisticated AI program."

== Risks ==
Risks associated with the use of AI in government include AI becoming susceptible to bias, a lack of transparency in how an AI application may make decisions, and the accountability for any such decisions. For example, a 2026 lawsuit alleged that the U.S. Department of Government Efficiency used ChatGPT to flag and cancel federal humanities grants, including projects on Jewish history and Israeli culture, over some objections from NEH officials, illustrating how automated decision-making could affect funding outcomes.

== AI Use Cases ==
=== Democratic Republic of the Congo ===
In 2025, the Democratic Republic of the Congo (DRC) introduced Snote Manager, an AI-powered examination management system developed by the Ministry of National Education and New Citizenship. The system automates the processing and correction of national secondary-school examination papers (EXETAT), reduces human errors, accelerates marking and facilitates faster publication of results.

=== Germany ===
AI is increasingly used in migration and asylum procedures In Germany, the Federal Office for Migration and Refugees (BAMF) uses the Language Biometrics Assistance System (DIAS), an AI-based dialect recognition system, to help identify asylum seekers’ countries or regions of origin through dialect recognition. Introduced in 2017 for Arabic dialects and expanded in 2022 to Dari, Persian, Farsi and Pashtu, DIAS analyses phonetic patterns in applicants’ speech to provide probabilistic assessments of their country or region of origin. It forms part of BAMF’s broader identity management system, alongside facial recognition, name transliteration and electronic device analysis.

=== Singapore ===
Singapore's One-Service Chatbot, developed by GovTech Singapore, the agency responsible for delivering the government's digital services, uses AI to improve municipal service delivery. It allows residents to report neighborhood problems, such as infrastructure damage and maintenance issues, through a conversational interface. Using automated request processing, the system helps identify and route complaints to the relevant government agencies, reducing manual administrative tasks and improving coordination between public authorities. By streamlining case submission and allocation, the chatbot makes municipal services more efficient and responsive.

=== South Korea ===
In 2022, South Korea introduced dBrain+, an advanced financial management information system that uses artificial intelligence to analyze real-time economic, fiscal and financial data, improving risk assessment and public-sector decision-making. The Korea Fiscal Information System (KFIS) and Korea Risk Assessment and Horizon Scanning (KORAHS) use dBrain+ to identify financial risks and support data-driven policy decisions. By centralizing national financial operations, including budgeting, fund management, debt oversight and performance evaluation, dBrain+ improves efficiency, transparency and predictive capabilities across central and local governments. The system is also integrated with 63 systems across 46 institutions, including the National Tax Service, Public Procurement Service and the Bank of Korea, facilitating coordination on contracts, tax collection and fund transfers.

== See also ==
- Applications of artificial intelligence
- Artificial general intelligence
- Artificial intelligence and elections
- AI-generated content in American politics
- Civic technology
- E-government
- Existential risk from artificial general intelligence
- Government by algorithm
- AI for Good
- Lawbot
- Project Cybersyn
- Regulation of artificial intelligence
- Sentient (intelligence analysis system)
- Singleton (global governance)
