= Energy informatics =

Energy informatics is a research field covering the use of information and communication technology to address energy utilization and management challenges. Methods used for "smart" implementations often combine IoT sensors with artificial intelligence and machine learning. Energy Informatics is founded on flow networks that are the major suppliers and consumers of energy. Their efficiency can be improved by collecting and analyzing information.

== Application areas ==
The field among other consider application areas within:

- Smart Buildings by developing ICT-centred solutions for improving the energy-efficiency of buildings.
- Smart Cities by investigating the synergies between demand patterns and supply availability of energy flows in cities and communities to improve energy efficiency, increase integration of renewable sources, and provide resilience towards system faults caused by extreme situations, like hurricanes and flooding.
- Smart Industries including the development of ICT-centred solutions for improving the energy efficiency and predictability of energy intensive industrial processes, without compromising process and product quality.
- Smart Energy Networks by developing ICT-centred solutions for coordinating the supply and demand in environmentally sustainable energy networks.
