= Masada (album) =

Studio album by Alpha Blondy and the Solar System
- Released: 17 August 1992
- Recorded: France
- Studio: Studio Davout
- Genre: Roots reggae
- Length: 56:49
- Label: World Pacific
- Producer: Alpha Blondy

Alpha Blondy chronology
Mystic Power (1991)	Masada (1992)	Dieu (1994)

Masada is a studio album by Ivory Coast reggae artist Alpha Blondy, with the Solar System. It was released in 1992 on World Pacific.

The album was very popular in France, where it went double gold.

== Critical reception ==
Professional ratings
Review scores
Source	Rating
AllMusic	4/5 stars
The Encyclopedia of Popular Music	3/5 stars

The Washington Post wrote that the album "offers an invariably melodic mix of romantic Afro-pop ('Rendezvous'), spiritual things ('God Is One') and political anthems ('Peace in Liberia'), all fashionably arranged to suit Blondy's yearning tenor."

== Track listing ==
All tracks are written by Alpha Blondy.

No.	Title	Length
1.	"Masada"	5:00
2.	"Multipartisme (Médiocratie)"	4:15
3.	"Rendez-Vous"	3:30
4.	"God Is One"	4:10
5.	"Yéyé"	4:27
6.	"Desert Storm"	4:23
7.	"Houphouet Yako"	3:38
8.	"Peace in Liberia"	3:43
9.	"Papa Bakoye"	4:31
10.	"Les Chiens"	3:31
11.	"Sciences Sans Conscience"	4:08
12.	"Fulgence Kassy"	3:48
13.	"Ca Me Fait Si Mal"	3:45
14.	"Mystic Night Move"	4:00
Total length:		56:49

All songs are backed by the Solar System.

== Personnel ==
- Arranged By – Alpha Blondy, Boncana Maiga
- Backing Vocals – Colau Van Montagu, Corine Van Montagu, Marylou Seba
- Bass Guitar – Abou Bbass Ae
- Electronic Drums, Keyboards – Romie (Ibis) Lawrence
- Engineer (Assistant Prise De Son) – Philippe Gassert
- Engineer [Prise De Son] – Dennis-Bovel, Laurent Patte
- Keyboards [Akai 1100] – Michel Lorents
- Lead Vocals – Alpha Blondy
- Mixed By – Dennis-Bovel
- Mixed By (Assistant De Mixage) – Laurent Patte
- Percussion – Clayton Joseph, Max Facon
- Percussion (Tama) – Bou N'Diaye (tracks: 2)
- Percussion (Zarb) – Pierre Rigopoulos (tracks: 6)
- Photography By – Pierre Terrasson
- Rhythm Guitar – Afriloue Eugène, Christian Poloni
- Soloist, Guitar – Christian Poloni
- Soloist, Saxophone – Alan Hoist
- Strings – Kouznetzof Alain, Gaunet Jean, Michel Cron
- Tenor Saxophone – Hatot Alain
- Trombone – Bolognesi Jacques
- Trumpet – Philippe Slominski
