= Mystic Power =

Studio album by Alpha Blondy
- Released: 2013
- Genre: Roots reggae
- Length: 1:02:56
- Label: VP
- Producer: Alpha Blondy

Alpha Blondy chronology
Vision (2011)	Mystic Power (2013)	Positive Energy (2015)

Mystic Power is a 2013 reggae album by the Ivorian artist Alpha Blondy.

Songs on the album address the Second Ivorian Civil War.

== Critical reception ==
Professional ratings
Review scores
Source	Rating
Robert Christgau	(2-star Honorable Mention)
RapReviews	7/10

The Washington Post wrote that "the songs are upbeat and assured, whether fueled by the soulful horns and backing vocals of 'My American Dream' or the slinky groove of 'J’ai Tue Le Commissaire.'” The East Bay Express wrote that "Blondy (seemingly effortlessly) does what he's done his entire career: make uplifting, inspirational music that seems to channel a higher power."

== Track listing ==
All tracks are written by Alpha Blondy.

No.	Title	Length
1.	"Hope" (featuring Beenie Man)	4:28
2.	"My American Dream"	4:57
3.	"J'ai tué le commissaire"	5:05
4.	"Seydou"	4:40
5.	"Crime spirituel"	3:49
6.	"La Bataille d'Abidjan"	4:27
7.	"France à fric"	3:57
8.	"Ouarzazate"	4:33
9.	"Soutra"	3:42
10.	"Woman"	4:14
11.	"Le Métèque"	2:58
12.	"Danger ivoirité"	4:16
13.	"Reconciliation" (featuring Tiken Jah Fakoly)	6:24
14.	"Pardon"	4:48
15.	"Exil (Malavoi)"	0:38
Total length:		01:02:56

== Personnel ==
- Alpha Blondy – lead vocals
