= City Brain =

Software system for urban management

- Simplified Chinese: 城市大脑
- Traditional Chinese: 城市大腦
Transcriptions
Standard Mandarin
- Hanyu Pinyin: chéngshì dànǎo

City Brain (sometimes treated as an improper noun by sources and rendered as city brain; Chinese: 城市大脑; pinyin: chéngshì dànǎo) is a software system that utilizes artificial intelligence and data collection for urban management. Developed by Chinese tech company Alibaba Group, the City Brain systems have been adopted by local governments throughout the country as well as in Kuala Lumpur, the capital of Malaysia. Currently, these systems are mostly used for traffic management, but they have been used and expanded to cover other needs as well. City Brain systems have been promoted as making cities "smarter" and improving their residents' quality of life. However, the systems have also faced criticism for issues relating to privacy, cost, and their use of surveillance.

== History and overview ==
The first City Brain system was announced and developed in 2016 by Alibaba Cloud for its home city of Hangzhou. First aiming to curb the city's high level of traffic congestion, it was initially "given control" of traffic lights in Xiaoshan District, where it increased traffic speed by 15%. This led to its adoption by the rest of the city in 2017, where it has seen praise for continuing to reduce congestion and aiding first responders to travel faster. In addition to traffic light management, the system also analyzes camera feeds to detect accidents and alert authorities. In the following years, many other local governments in China sought their own such systems. It was expected that the City Brain system would provide other public services, like fire control. It is Alibaba's computing arm, Alibaba Cloud, that launched the 2.0 version of the ET City Brain system in 2018, is not related to the Alibaba e-commerce site. It was, however, launched in Hangzhou, which is the headquarters of Alibaba's offices, before it was launched in Malaysia and its capital city, Kuala Lumpur.

In Hangzhou, the City Brain was first introduced as a pilot project in 2016 by Alibaba. It initially started in real-time traffic management on roads like Shixin Road. The system used AI technology of Alibaba Cloud to analyze citywide video and infrastructure data. It was also used to adjust traffic lights and dispatch public resources; early tests reportedly improved traffic flows by about 3% or 5% and up to 11% in some areas. In 2018 Hangzhou expanded its pilot program into a broader city platform and later Alibaba later launched City Brain 2.0 that covered 420 kilometers, more than 1,300 traffic lights and thousands of monitoring cameras. The upgrade also linked traffic officers through mobile alerts for fast response to incidents. Alibaba's CityBrain is still active and has expanded in 2026 with the most recent update being Hangzhou's launch of City Brain 3.0 in 2025 with new deployments in other cities including Hong Kong's planned AI City Brain announced in 2026.

In addition, Kuala Lumpur, the capital of Malaysia, announced its adoption of a City Brain system in 2018 to deal with traffic. City Brain's use in Kuala Lumpur was Alibaba's first overseas implementation of the platform. By September 2019, Alibaba stated that 22 Chinese cities, including Macau, as well as Kuala Lumpur, had City Brain systems. Kuala Lumpur became the first non-chinese city to use the City Brain technology to manage traffic. In collaboration with the Malaysia Digital Economy Corporation (MDEC), Alibaba launched the tool that will combine data from video and image recognition including data mining and machine learning technology to manage traffic. The project will help Malaysian urban planners make better traffic decisions and also help with detecting accidents before they occur. The first phase of the project involved just calculating the time it takes for vehicles to reach intersections and create structured summaries of data including traffic volume and the speed of cars in lanes. The scope of these systems has expanded, with some being used to track pollution, alert authorities to illegal gatherings and possible conflicts of interest/corruption in government outsourcing, and aid in contact tracing during the COVID-19 pandemic. Some commentators criticized this rapid adoption, pointing out the high cost of the system (often in the range of hundreds of millions of renminbi), questing their usability, especially for smaller communities, and asking if they could be trusted with city residents' personal data and information. Further attention has been brought to issues of privacy, with concerns being brought up over data harvesting, the use of surveillance, and issues with oversight and possible data breaches.
