= Merci (Alpha Blondy album) =

Studio album by Alpha Blondy
- Released: 2002
- Genre: Roots reggae
- Length: 50:32
- Label: Shanachie
- Producer: Alpha Blondy

Alpha Blondy chronology
Elohim (1999)	Merci (2002)	Jah Victory (2007)

Merci is a 2002 reggae album by the Ivorian artist Alpha Blondy.

Professional ratings
Review scores
Source	Rating
AllMusic	4/5 stars

== Track listing ==
All tracks are written by Alpha Blondy

No.	Title	Length
1.	"Wari" (featuring Sir Samuel and Leeroy Kesiah)	4:50
2.	"Who Are You" (featuring Ophélie Winter)	4:22
3.	"Quitte dans ça"	4:29
4.	"Souroukou Logo"	4:49
5.	"God Bless Africa"	4:38
6.	"Zoukéfiez-moi ça" (featuring Bibi Den's Tshibaya)	3:51
7.	"Ato Afri Loué"	4:29
8.	"Politruc"	4:04
9.	"Hey Jack"	4:06
10.	"Vanité"	4:18
11.	"Si on m'avait dit"	3:29
12.	"Le Feu"	3:07
Total length:		50:32

== Personnel ==
- Alpha Blondy – lead vocals
