= Jérusalem (Alpha Blondy album) =

Studio album by Alpha Blondy
- Released: 1986
- Studio: Tuff Gong
- Genre: Reggae
- Label: Shanachie

Alpha Blondy chronology
Apartheid Is Nazism (1985)	Jérusalem (1986)	Revolution (1987)

Jérusalem is an album by the Ivorian musician Alpha Blondy, released in 1986. Blondy recorded the album in Jamaica, backed by the Wailers. It sold more than 300,000 copies in France. Blondy sang the title track in Arabic, English, French, and Hebrew, in a effort to bridge Middle Eastern cultures.

== Critical reception ==
Professional ratings
Review scores
Source	Rating
AllMusic	3/5 stars
Robert Christgau	B+

Robert Christgau noted that, "at worst [Blondy] puts out a finer grade of generic Wailers than Rita's ever going to front, and three cuts sound like acts of genius rather than strokes of luck". Spin opined that Blondy's "light, delicately-phrased vocals together with the Wailers tight, massive drum 'n' bass-propelled breakdown feels more inspired by Pablo Moses than anyone else."

== Track listing ==
All tracks are written by Alpha Blondy.

Side one
No.	Title	Length
1.	"Jérusalem"	7:48
2.	"Politiqui"	6:35
3.	"Bloodshed in Africa"	4:19
4.	"I Love Paris"	5:15

Side two
No.	Title	Length
1.	"Kalachnikov Love"	5:20
2.	"Travailler C'est Trop Dur"	3:17
3.	"Miwa"	5:04
4.	"Boulevard"	5:26
5.	"Dji"	2:45
Total length:		45:49
