= Embedded intelligence =

Embedded intelligence is characterized as the ability of a product, process, or service to reflect on its own operational performance, usage load, or environment. The motivation for this may be to enhance the performance, lifetime, or quality of the product. This self-reflection might be facilitated by information collected via embedded sensors, and processed locally or communicated remotely for processing.

Embedded intelligence depends on a multidisciplinary approach for successful implementation.

== Characteristics and purposes ==
Embedded intelligence aims to deliver smarter products, systems and services to industry through their integration and purposeful use for particular applications. It can be realized by:

- Construction, where integrated assemblies use a fusion of technologies—for example, semiconductor integrated circuits and “More than Moore” systems that build directly on semiconductor devices
- Combination of functions—for example, a touchscreen that combines actuation with indication
- Connection, where information from one product sub-element, system product or service to another is carried by wires, radio, photonic, or other communication media, such as sound or chemical signatures

Embedded intelligence can serve many purposes, including:

- Monitoring of health and usage of products and high-value assets
- Ease of use of a product, system or service
- Market appeal and acceptance, where a product becomes fashionable—for example, a tablet that regained popularity by the addition of enhanced services, ergonomic design in terms of shape and functionality, and enhanced aesthetics
- The ability for a service, system, or product to be used by aging, disabled, or previously socially excluded people

== Applications ==
=== Health of high-value assets ===
High-value products and assets are deployed across a myriad of industrial sectors, ranging from transport, aviation, power networks, etc. Such assets present significant challenges in terms of their design, operation, and maintenance due to limitations in the visibility of the assets’ health. The ability to monitor these assets is impeded by aggressive ambient conditions influencing sensor drift and failure, power management, and communication issues.

Today's networks for transport (infrastructure, signalling and services in, for example train-lines), and power transmission (i.e. smart grid, network management, protection and control) require integrated sensors that can collect reliable information, transmit it securely, and turn it from data-to-knowledge into action to close the loop. That feedback allows the system/product to build resilience and agility.

=== Intelligent tags in car manufacturing ===
When car manufacturers embedded intelligent tags into the majority of their components, temperature, vibration, and other essential data can be harvested throughout the life-cycle of a car. The interrogation of fuzzy Bayesian network ontologies would enable the identification and prediction of faulty components that could be replaced and re-engineered to ensure greater reliability. The ontologies could also determine the genres of cars that need to be recalled - given driving history - thus lowering recall costs and enhancing the consumer experience.

== UK government perspective and industry need ==
There is an industry need for trained engineers in electronics systems as further growth is striven for within the UK, as delineated in the recently published “Electronics Systems: Challenges and Opportunities” (ESCO Report). This report has brought industry leaders and government together to deliver ambitious growth targets that by 2020 will see a further 150,000 people employed in electronic systems, such as those this CDT aims to provide. The report states that the critical shortages in highly trained and skilled employees can be addressed in part by the provision of Centers of Doctoral Training (CDTs) to fund and train PhD students. The Technology Strategy Board's (TSB) High-Value Manufacturing study also identified strategic themes of “Creating innovative products, through the integration of new materials, coatings, and electronics with new manufacturing technologies” and “Increasing the global competitiveness of UK manufacturing technologies by creating more efficient and effective manufacturing systems”.

The report identified the need for National Competencies, including “Intelligent systems and embedded electronics”. Additionally through the “Electronics, Photonics and Electrical Systems: Key technology area 2008-2011” report, the TSB are promoting Embedded Systems as a technology that the UK has the high capability and high market potential.

Within Europe, there is also significant investment being made through the ENIAC, Artemis and EPoSS programs that are set to continue to Horizon 2020 and will see close to €5 billion invested over 7 years. The recent Strategic Research Agenda in Smart Systems Integration of the European Technology Platform EPoSS also identified Embedded Intelligence as the key enabler in the design and manufacturing of complex products and services.

Even though what is said above may be factual, but do note that, those needs are different across the world and not may be always compatible with implementing the Embedded Intelligence.

== Predicted revenue ==
While it is relatively immature as a technology, the Internet of Things is likely to see the number of connected objects reach 50 billion by 2020. The integration of embedded processors with sensors, intelligence, wireless connectivity and other components with high level operating systems, middle-ware and system integration services is regarded as a new breed of electronics by Intel. They predict that over the next 10 years “IT devices for industries including medical, manufacturing, transportation, retail, communication, consumer electronics and energy will take a development direction that makes intelligent designs become a part of all of our lifestyles”. Accordingly, they forecast a significant growth for embedded systems (CAGR of 18% from 2011 to 2016). Data also reported by IDC forecasts the worldwide value of the embedded systems market to be worth €1.5 trillion in revenue by 2015 with the automotive, industrial, communications and healthcare sectors.

== The Internet of Things ==
Although the vision for the 'Internet of Things' was first formulated in 1999, the technology road-map still faces issues; the vision of having all objects linked to the internet might be only achievable when technology allows for global adoption. In this regard, Embedded Intelligence can be the key for these emerging technologies to enable globalization.

== See also ==
- Embedded software
