= Yitzhak Rabin (album) =

Studio album by Alpha Blondy
- Released: 1998
- Genre: Roots reggae
- Length: 55:55
- Label: Une Musique
- Producer: Alpha Blondy

Alpha Blondy chronology
Grand Bassam Zion Rock (1996)	Yitzhak Rabin (1998)	Elohim (1999)

Yitzhak Rabin is a 1998 reggae album by the Ivorian artist Alpha Blondy. The album pertains a message of global harmony which comes across through his multi-lingual approach to song writing as well as the instrumentation and composition of his music, with influences as far reaching as raï.

Professional ratings
Review scores
Source	Rating
AllMusic	4.5/5 stars

== Track listing ==
All tracks are written by Alpha Blondy

No.	Title	Length
1.	"New Dawn"	4:20
2.	"Yitzhak Rabin"	5:15
3.	"Assine Mafia"	4:48
4.	"Les Imbéciles"	3:51
5.	"Armée française"	4:38
6.	"Hypocrites"	3:50
7.	"Guerre civile"	4:25
8.	"Saraka"	4:07
9.	"Les Larmes de Thérèse"	3:27
10.	"Lalogo"	4:40
11.	"Maïmouna"	4:15
12.	"Bakôrôni"	4:19
Total length:		55:55

== Personnel ==
- Alpha Blondy – lead vocals

== Sales ==
Region	Certification	Certified units/sales
Ivory Coast	—	75,000
