= Apartheid Is Nazism =

Studio album by Alpha Blondy
- Released: 1985
- Studio: Studio ADS
- Genre: Reggae
- Label: EMI France; Shanachie (1987)
- Producer: Alpha Blondy

Alpha Blondy chronology
Cocody Rock!!! (1984)	Apartheid Is Nazism (1985)	Jérusalem (1986)

Apartheid Is Nazism is an album by the Ivorian musician Alpha Blondy. The title track was a hit; the album, as an import, was a success in the United States prior to its Shanachie release. Blondy supported the album with a North American tour.

== Production ==
The album was recorded in Abidjan. Blondy was backed by members of the Solar System Band, his touring group. Blondy sang in French, Arabic, English, African patois, and Hebrew, among other languages. He used salsa horns on "Apartheid Is Nazism".

== Critical reception ==
Professional ratings
Review scores
Source	Rating
AllMusic	4.5/5 stars
Robert Christgau	B+

Spin wrote that Blondy "creates an arresting pop-music montage by blending bits of traditional West African rhythms and call-and-response singing." Robert Christgau opined that, "as usual in West African pop, the voice is too mild, and as usual in West African reggae, the rhythm section is too buoyant," but acknowledged that "the singing completes an eloquently transatlantic groove." The Toronto Star deemed the album "powerful, provocative protest music with a rock-steady heart."

The Los Angeles Times noted that "there's a certain lack of snap that leaves the album more competent than truly gripping." The New York Times praised Blondy's willingness "to reveal convictions." The Gazette called the album "superb," writing that the title track is "as eloquent and angry as Marley at his best."

== Track listing ==
All tracks are written by Alpha Blondy.

Side one
No.	Title	Length
1.	"Afriki"	5:06
2.	"Jah Houphouet"	5:24
3.	"Apartheid Is Nazism"	4:48
4.	"Idjidja"	5:01
5.	"Sahel"	4:10

Side two
No.	Title	Length
1.	"Sebe Allah Y'e"	4:45
2.	"Kiti"	5:15
3.	"Come Back Jesus"	5:33
4.	"Djinamory"	4:38
Total length:		44:40

== Personnel ==
- Alpha Blondy: Vocals

The Solar System

- Julie Mourillon, Sam Camara: Rhythm guitar
- Christian Polloni, Yao Mao: Lead guitar
- Georges Kouakou: Keyboards
- Kamassa Seth: Bass
- Jose Shillingford, Michel Abihssira: Drums
- "Lick": Percussion

Additional personnel

- Michel Camikas, Nyaha Yodan Emmanuel, Patrick Artero: Horns
- Anne-Marie Constant, Manow Bale, Paula Moore, Rochelle Robertson: Backing vocals
