= Elohim (Alpha Blondy album) =

Studio album by Alpha Blondy
- Released: 1999
- Genre: Roots reggae
- Length: 58:01
- Label: Deelie
- Producer: Alpha Blondy

Alpha Blondy chronology
Yitzhak Rabin (1998)	Elohim (1999)	Merci (2002)

European Release

2005 Re-Release

Elohim is a 1999 reggae album by the Ivorian artist Alpha Blondy.

Professional ratings
Review scores
Source	Rating
AllMusic	3/5 stars

== Track listing ==
All tracks are written by Alpha Blondy

No.	Title	Length
1.	"Black Samouraï"	4:36
2.	"Haridjinan"	4:23
3.	"Les Voleurs de la République"	4:20
4.	"Dictature"	4:16
5.	"La Queue du Diable"	4:49
6.	"Journalistes en danger (Démocrature)"	4:10
7.	"When I Need You"	4:36
8.	"Djeneba"	4:35
9.	"Sabotage"	4:00
10.	"Take No Prisoner (Cannibalistic)"	4:40
11.	"Lune de miel (Honeymoon)"	3:53
12.	"Waïkiki Rock"	4:33
13.	"Petini Go Gaou"	4:33
14.	"Mônin"	4:11
Total length:		58:01

== Personnel ==
- Alpha Blondy – lead vocals
