= Alpha Blondy =

Ivorian reggae singer

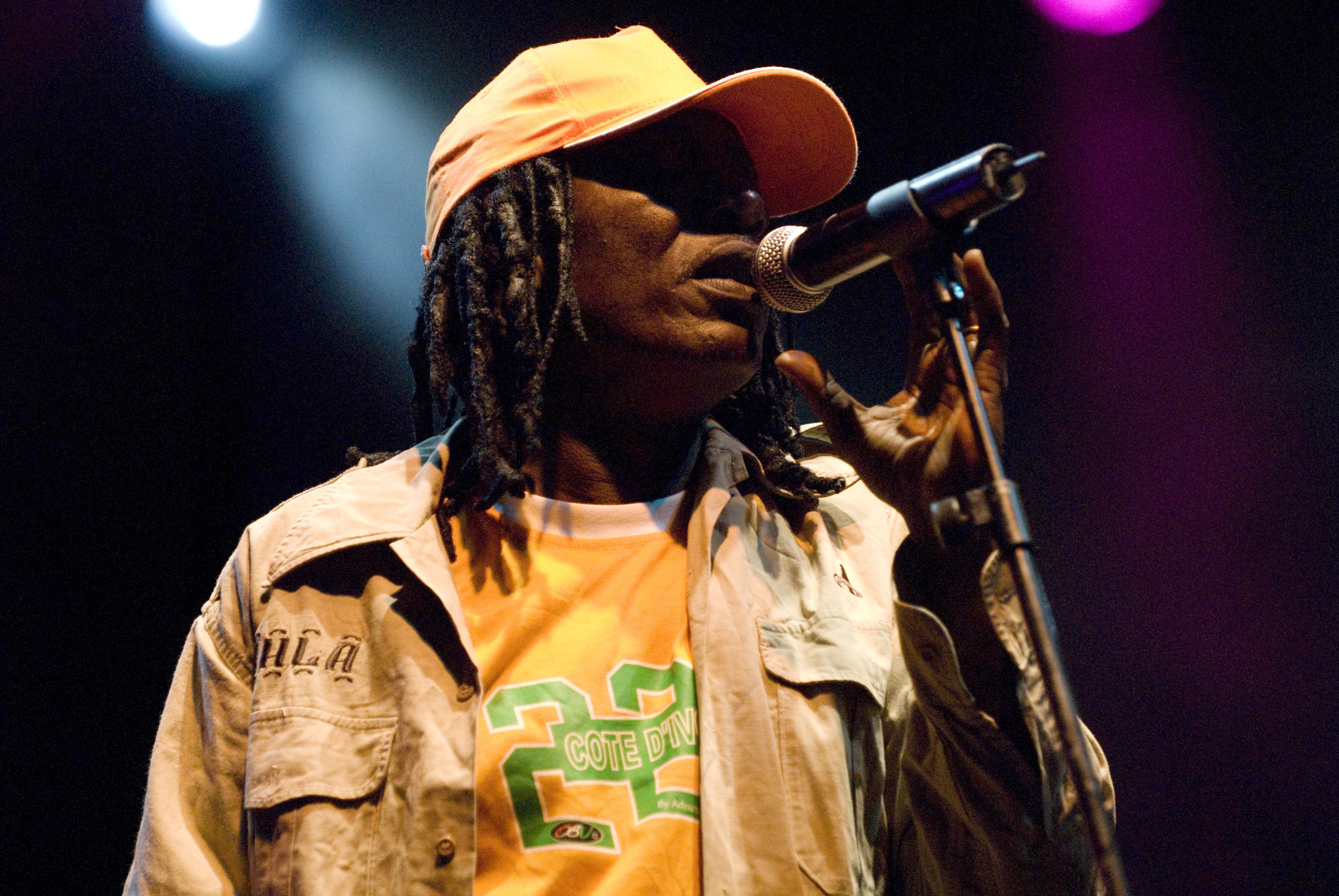
- Blondy in 2007

Background information
- Born: Seydou Koné; January 1, 1953 (age 72); Dimbokro, N'Zi Region, Ivory Coast
- Genres: Reggae
- Occupations: Singer, songwriter
- Years active: 1981–2023
- Labels: EMI France, VP Records, Wagram Music, Shanachie Records

Seydou Koné (French pronunciation: [sedu kɔne]; born January 1, 1953, in Dimbokro), better known by his stage name Alpha Blondy, is an Ivorian reggae singer and international recording artist. Many of his songs are politically and socially motivated, and are mainly sung in his native language Dyula, French and English, though he occasionally uses other languages, for example, Arabic, Hebrew, or Jamaican Patois.

== Early years ==
=== Childhood ===
The first son of a family of eight children, Seydou Koné was raised by his grandmother in an environment described by him as "among elders", which was to have a big impact on his career. In 1962, Alpha Blondy joined his father in Odienné, where he spent ten years, attended Sainte Elisabeth High School, and was involved in the Ivory Coast students movement. He formed a band in high school, but this affected his schooling and he was expelled for poor attendance. His parents sent him to study English in Monrovia, the capital city of Liberia, in 1973. He spent thirteen months there and then moved to the United States to improve his English.

=== College in the United States ===
In 1974, Seydou moved to New York where he majored in English at Hunter College and the Columbia University American Language Program, pursuing a career in teaching. In New York, he was introduced to Rastafari and attended concerts by Jamaican artists including Burning Spear. Seydou was involved in multiple altercations before returning to the Ivory Coast where he encountered further trouble until he reunited with his childhood friend, Fulgence Kassi, who had become a noted television producer. This was the beginning of his career as a musician, and he adopted the alias "Alpha Blondy".

== Musical career ==
After various TV shows for Kassi, Blondy recorded his first solo album in 1982, entitled Jah Glory. This album was to have enormous success and would become later a symbol of resistance because of the song "Brigadier Sabari," which documents his experience of being arrested in Abidjan in the 1980s and his subsequent mistreatment by the police. Alpha Blondy became a star in Abidjan with his African twist of reggae music, becoming in the eyes of his fans "the Bob Marley of Africa". Alpha Blondy is spiritual, political and positive just like Marley himself, and recorded a cover of Bob Marley's song "War". In order to reach more people with his message, he chose to sing in many languages: English; French; Baoulé, and his native language – Dioula. Later, he also brought new instrumentation to his brand of reggae such as the violin and cello.

Soon, the fame of Alpha Blondy spread to Europe. Following the success of an EP entitled Rasta Poué, he went to Paris in 1984 to make his second album, Cocody Rock, with the label Pathe Marconi. Blondy travelled to the island of Jamaica and recorded the title track of this album with Marley's backing group, The Wailers.

Back home in 1985, Blondy went into the studio to record Apartheid Is Nazism; the title song was a call for the end of apartheid. In 1986, he recorded “Jerusalem” at Tuff Gong studios in Jamaica, again with The Wailers featuring Aston "Family Man" Barrett. Blondy tried to promote unity between the religion of Islam, Judaism and Christianity. He drew his arguments and inspiration from his own diverse knowledge of the Bible, the Quran, and the Torah. That same year, he sang in Hebrew during a concert in Morocco. At this point, he was continuously touring. His new album Revolution had a lighter, gentler sound; this album featured cellos in the instrumentation, and the line-up included veteran Ivory Coast singer Aicha Kone. The album also included "Jah Houphouët parle", a long speech by Ivory Coast president Félix Houphouët-Boigny with only the most minimal beat behind it.

Blondy spent the years 1987–89 giving concerts and recording SOS Guerre Tribale in Abidjan. This was promoted by Blondy himself, as he was distancing himself from Pathe Marconi at this stage. This was not to be a real success but it did not deter Blondy and in 1991 he returned to Europe for a concert tour and to record his next album Masada with the help of musicians such as Bocana Maiga and the British reggae producer Dennis Bovell. The album, with its hit single "Rendez Vous", was a success, and Blondy was later to receive his first gold record in Paris.

At the beginning of 1993, worn out from a world tour, Blondy succumbed to depression and was taken into an institution for psychiatric help. But as his health recovered he recorded the album Dieu ("God"), on which he appears more spiritual and religious, on tracks such as "Heal Me", about his illness and recovery.

Blondy's psychiatric treatment continued but on 10 December 1994, he was back with the festival in memory of President Houphouet, and later he made his European comeback at a concert at Le Zenith in Paris. In 1996, Blondy released a hits compilation and went back into the studio to record the album Grand Bassam Zion, singing in six languages: Malinke; Arabic; French; English; Ashanti and Wolof.

After two more years in Paris, Blondy returned to his homeland in 1998, with a new album, The Prophet. Convinced his label was too focused on the international market, he decided to create his own label. Since then he has recorded albums and singles, such as "Yitzhak Rabin", in memory of the Israeli prime minister who was assassinated in 1995 (this was accompanied by a grueling tour of Europe), the single "Journaliste en Danger" from his 2000 album Elohim.

Alpha Blondy celebrated 20 years as a recording artist with the 2002 release of CD MERCI, featuring Ophelie Winter and Saian Supa Crew, which earned him a 2003 Grammy Award nomination for "Best Reggae Album". However, due to the political situation in Ivory Coast, he was unable to personally attend the award ceremony in New York City. In an unprecedented move, the Grammy Awards permitted him to send a representative in his place of honour. In 2005 Akwaba was released. His CD Jah Victory was released July 2007. It featured Sly Dunbar and Robbie Shakespeare, as well as Tyrone Downie formerly of Bob Marley and the Wailers. "Victory" is in honor of the peace agreement that was reached and implemented in the Ivory Coast in March 2007.

One of Blondy's most popular and successful songs was "Sébé Allah Y'é".

On 19 July 2009, Blondy performed at New York's Central Park before a crowd of many native Africans, Jamaicans, and Americans.

On 13 June 2010, a large crowd was allowed into a Blondy concert in the Ivory Coast to celebrate the peace and unity of the country. Overcrowded conditions at the concert resulted in at least 20 people being injured, two of whom died.

On 27 June 2010, Alpha Blondy was the closing act at Parkpop, The Hague, Netherlands. He replaced Snoop Dogg and Beenie Man.

Blondy has also been an important influence on other African reggae artists such as Ismaël Isaac.

In November 2014 singer/songwriter Jonathan Wilson released an EP called Slide By featuring the song "Alpha Blondy Was King".

Released in January 2015, the Roots Reggae Library featured an edition on Alpha Blondy with interpretations and translations of songs in all languages, including those in Dioula.

In February 2023, Blondy Performed in front of home crowd at the Alassane Ouattara Stadium in Abidjan for the closing ceremony of the 2023 African Cup of Nations. Blondy performed two songs, "Sebe Allah Ye" and his anthem, "Cocody Rock".

== Faith ==
Alpha Blondy was born to a Muslim father and a Christian mother, and was brought up by a grandmother "who taught him to love everyone". Blondy's respect for all religions and the spirituality he derives from them can be heard on the tracks "God is One" or "Jerusalem" where he sang for unity among all religions in 1986.

== Humanitarian ==
In 2005, Alpha Blondy was named United Nations Ambassador of Peace for Côte d'Ivoire. He made great efforts to bring about a peaceful solution to his country's political and physical division which was a result of an attempted coup in 2001. As of March 2007 a peace agreement was signed and implemented, due to the hard work of many people including Alpha Blondy. Alpha now reaches out further with the newly created not-for-profit, non-government, non-political, charitable foundation, Alpha Blondy Jah Glory Foundation, which works towards ending social injustice and generational poverty by giving people the tools that they need to help themselves. He strongly believes in helping the poor (Jah Glory), and also that children should not be hurt. The Foundation strives to create and implement grassroots programs at the village level, such as the Women's Self-Sufficiency Micro Loan Program, to teach women who are caring for multiple orphans how to start and manage their own business, to better provide for their families, as well as other sustainable projects, such as the Tafari-Genesis Retreat Camp for Children (Ivory Coast and Burkina Faso). It especially hopes to bring joy and hope to children who have been affected by civil wars, former child soldiers, and those who suffer from chronic life-threatening illnesses, such as sickle-cell anemia, malaria, asthma, etc.

Alpha Blondy continues to fight for peace and unity all around the world through music. A recent example is his single "Who Are You" with Ophélie Winter against antipersonnel mines. He has also participated at many humanitarian and charity concerts, such as the concert in Senegal in March 2006 for the eradication of Malaria in Africa (where he appeared along with many other celebrities). He also continues this work in Ivory Coast itself, at his annual free concert at Bassam beach called "festa".

In 2014, he sang On n'oublie pas (written by Serge Bilé) with several artists and personalities including Jocelyne Béroard, Harry Roselmack and Admiral T. This song is a tribute to the 152 victims from Martinique of the crash of 16 August 2005, to remember this event and to help the AVCA, the association of the victims of the air disaster, to raise funds.

== Best known songs ==
His first success was "Brigadier Sabari". Some representative songs are:

- "Sebe Allah Y'e"
- "Jah Glory – in which he sings against poverty
- "Apartheid is Nazism"
- "Brigadier Sabari" – satirical lyrics about police brutality
- "Cocody Rock" – has become an Alpha Blondy anthem
- "Guerre Civile" – about civil war
- "Jerusalem" – a call for peace. The lyrics begin with a prayer in Hebrew
- "Journalistes en danger" – about the assassination of Norbert Zongo
- "Politiqui" – about civilian / military government alternance
- "Yitzhak Rabin" – written in 1995, following the assassination of Israeli Prime Minister Yitzhak Rabin, and dedicated to him.
- "Sweet Fanta Diallo"
- "Téré"
- "Blesser"
- "Rasta Poué"
- "Ethiopia De Eli Boy Hag"
- "Masada"
- "Come Back Jesus"
- "Peace in Liberia" – Regarding the desire for peace in all war-torn Muslim countries
- "Multipartisme (Médiocratie)"
- "Rendez-Vous"
- "Jah Houphouet" In 1988, a generation of American skiers was introduced to the music of Alpha Blondy when the track, from the 1985 album Apartheid is Nazism was featured on the soundtrack of Greg Stump's ski movie, Blizzard of Aahhh's.

== Discography ==
Studio albums

- Jah Glory! (1982)
- Cocody Rock!!! (1984)
- Apartheid Is Nazism (1985)
- Jérusalem (1986)
- Revolution (1987)
- The Prophets (1989)
- S.O.S Guerre Tribale (1991)
- Masada (1992)
- Dieu (1994)
- Grand Bassam Zion Rock (1996)
- Yitzhak Rabin (1998)
- Elohim (2000)
- Merci (2002)
- Jah Victory (2007)
- Vision (2011)
- Mystic Power (2013)
- Positive Energy (2015)
- Human Race (2018)
