= Grand Bassam Zion Rock =

Studio album by Alpha Blondy and The Solar System
- Released: 1996
- Genre: Roots reggae
- Length: 1:05:08
- Label: EMI France
- Producer: Alpha Blondy

Alpha Blondy chronology
Dieu (1994)	Grand Bassam Zion Rock (1996)	Yitzhak Rabin (1998)

Grand Bassam Zion Rock is a 1996 reggae album by the Ivorian artist Alpha Blondy.

== Track listing ==
All tracks are written by Alpha Blondy

No.	Title	Writer(s)	Length
1.	"Ragga Gangstar"		4:43
2.	"Alpha Kaya"		3:24
3.	"Zion Love"		4:55
4.	"Course au pouvoir"		4:18
5.	"Ya Fohi"		4:53
6.	"Valerie"		4:17
7.	"Grand-Bassam"		3:26
8.	"Mo"		3:33
9.	"Cheik Amadou Bamba"		3:51
10.	"Sefon Dance"	Martin Guedada	2:23
11.	"Unite nationale"		4:05
12.	"Silence Houphouet d'or"		13:00
13.	"N'Kabourou"		3:38
14.	"Mystere naturel"	Bob Marley	3:44
Total length:			1:05:08

== Personnel ==
- Alpha Blondy – lead vocals

== Sales ==
Region	Certification	Certified units/sales
Ivory Coast	—	75,000
