= The Prophets (album) =

Studio album by Alpha Blondy
- Released: 1989
- Label: Capitol

Alpha Blondy chronology
Revolution (1987)	The Prophets (1989)	S.O.S Guerre Tribale (1991)

The Prophets is an album by the Ivorian musician Alpha Blondy, released in 1989. He is credited with his band, the Solar System. Blondy sang in French, Dioula, Arabic, and English.

== Critical reception ==
Professional ratings
Review scores
Source	Rating
AllMusic	4.5/5 stars
Chicago Tribune	4/4 stars
Robert Christgau	B
Los Angeles Daily News	3/4 stars

Robert Christgau called The Prophets "a professional reggae album with the drums too loud, sliding gradually from felt convention to grooveful genericism." Trouser Press wrote: "Mixing synthesizers, horns, a female chorus and way too much reverb, [Blondy] deftly shifts in and out of reggae rhythms with political and religious songs in English, French and Dioula." The Chicago Tribune deemed it "a wonderfully accessible sound that combines the raw power and urgency of reggae and calypso with tinges of pop and R & B."

The Gazette determined that "despite its derivative feel, The Prophets is a shimmering tribute to the spirit of reggae and Rastafarianism." The Sun-Sentinel noted that it "sports a hybrid Caribbean sound that often fuses reggae's traditional rhythmic lilt to a hard electronic back beat." The Washington Post stated that "the music defines a distinctively African brand of reggae with a lighter bottom, sweeter harmonies, bouncier horn charts and a greater emphasis on secondary polyrhythms."

AllMusic called the album "as soulful and militant as past efforts, with an added gloss to the production that may win new listeners."

== Track listing ==
All tracks are written by Alpha Blondy.

Side one
No.	Title	Length
1.	"The Prophet (Allah Léka Netchi)"	3:02
2.	"Banana"	3:44
3.	"Coup D'Etat"	2:56
4.	"Kolombaria"	4:13

Side two
No.	Title	Length
1.	"Face to Face"	4:19
2.	"Black Men Tears"	5:15
3.	"Corinthiens"	3:15
4.	"Jah Music"	6:25
