= Jah Victory =

Studio album by Alpha Blondy
- Released: 2007
- Genre: Roots reggae
- Length: 1:17:41
- Label: Mediacom
- Producer: Tyrone Downie

Alpha Blondy chronology
Merci (2002)	Jah Victory (2007)	Vision (2011)

Jah Victory is a 2007 reggae album by the Ivorian artist Alpha Blondy.

== Track listing ==
No.	Title	Length
1.	"I Wish You Were Here"	4:25
2.	"Sankara"	3:52
3.	"Ranita"	3:57
4.	"Ne tirez pas sur l'ambulance"	4:18
5.	"Demain t'appartient"	4:10
6.	"Bahia"	4:20
7.	"Mister Grand Geule"	4:12
8.	"Afrika Yako"	3:25
9.	"Cameroun"	4:42
10.	"Jah Light"	4:11
11.	"Le Bal des combattus"	3:54
12.	"Tampiri"	3:58
13.	"Les Salauds"	3:21
14.	"Sales racistes"	4:16
15.	"Ikafo"	4:34
16.	"Jesus"	3:14
17.	"Gban Gban"	4:29
18.	"La Planète"	4:02
19.	"La Route de la paix"	3:52
Total length:		01:17:41

== Personnel ==
- Alpha Blondy – lead vocals
- Robbie Shakespeare - bass guitar
- Sly Dunbar - drums
