= Positive energy district =

A positive energy district (PED) is an urban area that produces at least as much energy on an annual basis as it consumes. The purpose of a PED is not to be an island isolated from the rest of the energy system but rather a functional and flexible part of the larger whole. The impetus to develop whole positive energy districts instead of single buildings is based on the possibility of sharing resources, managing energy efficiently systems across many buildings and reaching economics of scale. The overarching design principles of PEDs can be summarized as follows:

- Development of a PED should start by minimizing local energy demand by applying all reasonable energy efficiency measures.
- Remaining energy needs of the PED should be covered as far as reasonably possible by locally produced renewable or zero-emission energy. Thus the planning of a PED focuses on the local conditions, available energy resources and the possibilities of reusing local surplus energy.
- Smart planning methods and smart control are needed to make the energy system work as a whole. Energy production and loads should be designed to meet so that energy is produced close to consumption, both in location and time. For example, the production of local solar power has a natural tendency to match with the loads air conditioners and refrigerators. On the other hand, smart control can be used to coordinate other similar peaks in production and consumption. For example, electric vehicles can be charged at optimized times. Similarly, some parts of HVAC systems can be adjusted to operate at beneficial times without causing any inconvenience to building users.

The development of PEDs is a topic of intense international R&D activities and first pilot areas have been developed. JPI Urban Europe has listed 29 pilot areas around Europe.
