= House of the Dragon: Season 1 (soundtrack) =

Soundtrack album by Ramin Djawadi
- Released: October 24, 2022
- Genre: Soundtrack
- Length: 123:05
- Label: WaterTower Music
- Producer: Ramin Djawadi

Ramin Djawadi soundtrack chronology
Westworld: Season 4 (2022)	House of the Dragon: Season 1 (2022)	3 Body Problem (2024)

Singles from House of the Dragon: Season 1
- 1. "The Prince That Was Promised" Released: August 18, 2022; 2. "Protector of the Realm" Released: October 9, 2022; 3. "Lament" Released: October 16, 2022; 4. "Fate of the Kingdoms" Released: October 16, 2022

House of the Dragon: Season 1 is the soundtrack album for the first season of the HBO television series House of the Dragon, an independent prequel to Game of Thrones (2011–2019). Ramin Djawadi, who composed for Game of Thrones, returned to score for the series. Djawadi wanted the score to "keep the DNA alive from the original show", hence he created some cues based on the themes from the original show, but included new themes for the characters involved. He also experimented with instrumentation to create a minor difference from the original show. The album was led by four singles — "The Prince That Was Promised", "Protector of the Realm", "Lament" and "Fate of the Kingdoms" — released on August 18, October 9 and 16, 2022. The 44-track score album was released by WaterTower Music on October 24, 2022, a day after the season finale premiered.

== Background and development ==
Ramin Djawadi signed to compose the score for House of the Dragon in October 2020. The series was a prequel to Game of Thrones, and to establish the connection, Djawadi had blended themes from the series, so that he could "keep the DNA of the original show alive". In a video interview to David Griffin at IGN's State of Streaming 2022, Djawadi explained on the incorporation of Game of Thrones title theme in the second episode, and thought it as a "good example of tying the older material back into the newer themes", and continued "as a franchise to just connect all of these stories together. In the original main title, we always looked at and thought of it as an overarching theme that connects all of the characters and the journey and the adventures of this universe. So we felt it would be appropriate to connect it with this main title theme again." He also opined that House of the Dragon is also an interpretation of Game of Thrones, though being set 100 years before.

Djawadi also produced new music to the franchise, as each character has their own themes outside their connection to the overarching themes. Unlike Game of Thrones, which focuses on several families, House of the Dragon deals with the Targaryens within the family. Djawadi felt that the dragon theme was the "overarching Targaryen theme", but he later focused on the other characters, such as Rhaenyra, Daemon, Alicent and Viserys, and created multiple themes focusing on the family. The music of House of the Dragon mainly focuses on Daemon and Rhaenyra. He called the theme from Rhaenyra as his favourite theme, as it was slightly departed from the original tone, and felt that "Whenever that comes up, it always just feels really cool. I feel it gives her a lot of power. The first time she flew in on the dragon, and then when she leaves and that theme plays, in episode three, that's the first time we hear it." He also created another theme for Rhaenyra, which was an emotional theme. But for the first vocal theme, Djawadi felt that as "a new part of the sound palette and that's been fun to write. I'm still looking creatively [for if there is] something that I haven't used that could be fitting for this character or this family."

He was mentored by the showrunners Miguel Sapochnik and Ryan Condal to understand the show and also providing the apt tone for the visuals. While producing the score, he discussed with Sapochnik and Condal on how to use the music for particular sequences, and how the instrumentation should occur. All of the music he wrote, were being sampled into digital demos, for the showrunners to play them and watch the show, to see how the music fits in the picture, and later discuss on editing the cues, after which the score is being recorded. Djawadi mentioned it as the "spotting session" in which he decides where music should and should not be placed, and added "...we tweak right up until the very end when the show has to be finalized because most times when we discuss the music, the visuals are not finished. The visual effects, the sound effects. Everything happens in parallel. So sometimes you wind up doing what we call overscoring, where you put too much music in the show [...] You make these decisions until the very end. And it's always a tricky thing to get the balance just right. I think it's really well done in House of the Dragon and Game of Thrones. Like you said, sometimes, having no music can be more powerful than actually playing something because music always enhances things. Sometimes, not enhancing a scene can make it more awkward, more scary or more emotional."

== Composition ==
As similar to Game of Thrones, the cello was used as the primary instruments in House of the Dragon. However, Djawadi made minor adjustments on the instrumentation, which he referred as the total instrumental swap, on comparing the musical identities with the two series. He did not use the solo violin, but used the viola, which had "a little bit lower in range and different tambor". He used newer instruments, such as the ethnic bamboo flutes and woodwinds, alongside multiple instruments. Djawadi wanted to " push the cello up into the violin range [because] there is a thickness to it up higher than the violin and I like that sound. It's the same with the viola — obviously the viola can play lower than the violin, but even if the viola plays higher, it has a different timbre."

In the fifth episode, during Rhaenyra's pre-wedding dance sequence, Djawadi said that the music was written even before the shooting had started, as "the music had to be there first so they could choreograph the dancing to it". Hence, he read the script and discussed on how the scene comes to fruition. Djawadi said "We have the drums, and it's just maybe not what you'd expect of wedding music—tribal isn't the right word, but the percussive element, there's definitely a strong background of that there. So it was fun to write it and see how they shot the scene to it. And then later it turns into score, obviously, when it all goes crazy, but I think there were three pieces I had to write before. So they were written, like, over a year ago." He also mentioned Rhaenys' grand entrance during the coronation as one of his "favorite musical moments of the show so far", where the scene transitioned from "celebration mode to pure chaos in an instant" and the music syncs as Alicent's eyes close. He also included the main title theme in the concluding moments, which he did with the balance of sound effects.

== Track listing ==
All tracks are written by Ramin Djawadi.

No.	Title	Key Scenes/Notes	Length
1.	"Main Title"	Used in the opening sequence.	1:45
2.	"The Heirs of the Dragon"	"The Heirs of the Dragon": The Great Council chooses Viserys Targaryen over Rhaenys Targaryen in the succession of the Iron Throne. Traces of the Dragon's Theme, Main Theme, King's Theme and Aemond Targaryen's Theme are heard.	2:27
3.	"Reign of the Targaryens"	"The Heirs of the Dragon": Rhaenyra Targaryen flies her dragon, Syrax. The Dragon's Theme is played, with traces of the Main Theme.	1:31
4.	"Rhaenyra's Welcome"	Princess Rhaenyra Targaryen's Theme. "The Heirs of the Dragon": Rhaenyra Targaryen and her best friend, Alicent Hightower, return to the Red Keep of King's Landing. Traces of the Main Theme.	1:39
5.	"A Pack of Hounds"	"The Heirs of the Dragon": Commander of the City Watch, Prince Daemon Targaryen, rounds up and dismembers/executes all known criminals in King's Landing.	2:57
6.	"The Tournament"	"The Heirs of the Dragon": The tourney for the infant Prince Baelon Targaryen is held. Traces of Viserys' Theme.	1:51
7.	"An Impossible Choice"	King Viserys Targaryen's Theme. "The Heirs of the Dragon": Daemon Targaryen and Criston Cole joust and fight one another in a melee; Viserys Targaryen chooses to sacrifice his wife, Aemma Targaryen, in the hopes of saving their baby boy from death in childbirth. "The Lord of the Tides": A sorrowful rendition is heard as Viserys watches over his family at the feast.	1:34
8.	"The Rogue Prince"	Prince Daemon Targaryen's Theme. "The Heirs of the Dragon": Viserys Targaryen banishes his brother Daemon Targaryen from King's Landing.	1:43
9.	"The Prince That Was Promised"	The Prince That Was Promised Theme. "The Heirs of the Dragon": Viserys Targaryen names his daughter, Rhaenyra Targaryen, the heir to the Iron Throne; Rhaenyra is told of the prophecy of the Song of Ice and Fire. Traces of the Main Title and Dragon's Theme.	4:34
10.	"Compromise and Consequences"	"The Rogue Prince": Hand of the King, Otto Hightower, sets out for Dragonstone to confront the rogue Daemon Targaryen. Otto Hightower, asks his daughter, Alicent, to visit King Viserys. Traces of Alicent Hightower's Theme.	2:53
11.	"The Power of Prophecy"	Rhaenyra's Choral Melody. "The Rogue Prince": Rhaenyra Targaryen ends the conflict between Daemon Targaryen and Otto Hightower on Dragonstone. "Second of His Name": Rhaenyra Targaryen and Criston Cole witness the arrival of the royal White Hart; Rhaenyra returns to the King's Camp, bloodied from killing a boar; the King's entourage return to King's Landing.	2:36
12.	"Trouble in the Stepstones"	"The Rogue Prince": Master of Ships, Corlys Velaryon, comes to Daemon Targaryen for aid against the Triarchy pirates, led by Craghas Drahar: the Crabfeeder.	2:25
13.	"Surrender"	The Triarchy Theme. "Second of His Name": Daemon Targaryen receives a message from Viserys Targaryen, who has sent aid to the war effort in the Stepstones; Daemon uses himself as bait to lure out the Triarchy.	4:14
14.	"King of the Narrow Sea"	"Second of His Name": Corlys Velaryon leads the ambush against the Triarchy; Daemon Targaryen kills the Crabfeeder. Traces of Daemon's Theme, the Velaryon Theme, and Main Title.	6:17
15.	"Lanterns at Nightfall"	"King of the Narrow Sea": Daemon Targaryen leads his niece, Rhaenyra Targaryen, through the streets of King's Landing; Daemon takes her to a brothel and seduces her.	5:00
16.	"Whatever May Come"	The Tragic Love Theme. "King of the Narrow Sea": Rhaenyra Targaryen seduces her sworn protector, Ser Criston Cole. This theme is so called "Tragic Love" for it will be used not only to represent the quickly broken relationship between Rhaenyra and Criston, but also the tragic fate of Daemon Targaryen and Laena Velaryon's relationship.	2:53
17.	"House Velaryon"	House Velaryon Theme. "We Light the Way": Viserys Targaryen arrives at Driftmark to meet Corlys Velaryon; the Velaryon family sails for King's Landing; the Velaryon family arrive at the wedding between Rhaenyra Targaryen and Laenor Velaryon, Corlys' son. "The Lord of the Tides": Vaemond Velaryon arrives at King's Landing.	2:38
18.	"The Green Dress"	Alicent Hightower's Theme. "We Light the Way": Alicent Hightower bids farewell to her father Otto Hightower; Alicent attends Rhaenyra Targaryen's wedding in a dress of green, representing the colors of her house.	2:50
19.	"First Dance"	"We Light the Way": Rhaenyra Targaryen and Laenor Velaryon share the first dance of the wedding.	1:05
20.	"Celebration Dance"	"We Light the Way": The guests of the wedding all join in the dance. Traces of Viserys' Theme.	2:14
21.	"Targaryen Dance"	"We Light the Way": Final dance of the wedding.	1:54
22.	"We Light the Way"	"We Light the Way": Criston Cole kills Laenor Velaryon's lover, Joffrey Lonmouth; Rhaenyra Targaryen and Laenor are wed; Criston attempts suicide but is saved by Alicent Hightower. Discordant reprise of The Prince That Was Promised Theme.	2:47
23.	"Destiny"	"The Princess and the Queen": Laena Velaryon, wife of Daemon Targaryen, commits suicide by dragonfire rather than die in childbirth. Reprise of Tragic Love Theme.	2:56
24.	"Pass Judgement"	Conspiracy Theme. "The Princess and the Queen": Master of Whisperers, Larys Strong, assassinates his father, Lyonel Strong, and brother, Harwin Strong, in the ruins of Harrenhal; Larys informs Alicent Hightower of his deeds. Traces of Alicent Hightower's Theme.	4:20
25.	"Funeral by the Sea"	"Driftmark": Laena Velaryon's funeral is held at her ancestral home of Driftmark. Reprise of Tragic Love Theme.	3:00
26.	"Daemon and Rhaenyra"	"Driftmark": Rhaenyra Targaryen and Daemon Targaryen sleep together. Reprise of Rhaenyra's Theme.	2:41
27.	"Aemond Rides Vhagar"	"Driftmark": Aemond Targaryen, second-born son of Viserys Targaryen and Alicent Hightower, claims the recently riderless dragon, Vhagar, as his mount, flying her around Driftmark. Traces of Aemond's Theme and Dragon's Theme.	3:10
28.	"The Hard Truth"	"Driftmark": Alicent Hightower demands retribution for the loss of Aemond Targaryen's eye; Alicent attacks Rhaenyra Targaryen. Traces of the Death Theme and King Viserys' theme.	2:31
29.	"Sealed in Fire and Blood"	"Driftmark": Rhaenyra Targaryen and Daemon Targaryen orchestrate a fake death for Laenor Velaryon, so that they may marry, while Laenor flees to Essos. Reprise of Rhaenyra's Choral Melody.	4:10
30.	"Protector of the Realm"	"The Lord of the Tides": The ailing King Viserys Targaryen walks to the Iron Throne to defend Rhaenyra Targaryen and her son, Lucerys Velaryon, as heirs to the Iron Throne and Driftmark respectively. Reprise of Viserys' Theme and the King's Theme.	3:15
31.	"The Silent Sisters"	Death Theme. The Death Theme is a sinister choral motif that plays whenever someone has died or will die. "The Lord of the Tides": Princess Rhaenys Targaryen, The Queen Who Never Was, watches over the Silent Sisters autopsy of Vaemond Velaryon. "The Green Council": Alicent Hightower watches over the Silent Sisters taking care of King Visery's corpse before placing a crown over his body. Reprise of Alicent Hightower's Theme.	3:23
32.	"The Language of Girls"	"The Lord of the Tides": Rhaenyra Targaryen and Alicent Hightower make amends at the Targaryen family feast. Reprise of The Prince That Was Promised Theme.	1:42
33.	"A Warning"	"The Lord of the Tides": Viserys Targaryen, speaks of the Song of Ice and Fire, which Alicent Hightower misinterprets, just before Viserys' death. Traces of Viserys' Theme and the King's Theme.	2:29
34.	"Lament"	"The Green Council": Alicent Hightower and Otto Hightower mourn the loss of Viserys Targaryen; Alicent informs Otto of Viserys' false last wishes to place her son, Aegon Targaryen, on the Throne. Traces of Viserys Theme, the King's Theme, and the conspiracy Theme.	3:26
35.	"Fate of the Kingdoms"	"The Green Council": The Greens scramble to ensure Aegon Targaryen is placed on the Iron Throne; lords and ladies are rounded up to swear fealty and Rhaenys Targaryen is locked within her room. Reprise of Alicent Hightower's Theme and the Conspiracy Theme.	3:25
36.	"Interests of the Realm"	"The Green Council": Aegon Targaryen reluctantly walks through the crowds of civilians in the Dragonpit to accept his role as the new King on the Iron Throne. Reprise of Alicent Hightower's Theme and the Conspiracy Theme.	3:52
37.	"Coronation"	"The Green Council": King Aegon Targaryen is crowned and cheered by the masses. Reprise of the King's Theme.	1:14
38.	"Dragons Will Rule the Kingdom"	"The Green Council": Rhaenys Targaryen bursts through the floor of the Dragonpit on her mount, Meleys, and spares the Greens before fleeing to Dragonstone. Traces of the Dragon's Theme and Velaryon Theme.	1:36
39.	"The Crown of Jaehaerys"	"The Black Queen": Rhaenyra Targaryen is crowned on Dragonstone as the true Queen of the Seven Kingdoms and attends her first war council. Reprise of The Prince That Was Promised Theme, Rhaenyra's Theme, and Rhaenyra's Choral Melody.	3:19
40.	"Dragons Do Not Fear Blood"	"The Black Queen": Rhaenyra Targaryen and Daemon Targaryen confront Otto Hightower on the walkway of Dragonstone. Traces of the Main Theme and Rhaenyra's Choral Melody.	1:21
41.	"Death and Rebirth"	"The Black Queen": Rhaenyra Targaryen goes into premature labor, upon hearing the news of her father's death and Aegon Targaryen's coronation; her child subsequently dies. Traces of the Main Theme, Rhaenyra's Choral Melody, and Death Theme.	1:36
42.	"True Meaning of Loyalty"	"The Black Queen": Corlys Velaryon and Rhaenys Targaryen pledge their support to Queen Rhaenyra Targaryen; Rhaenyra's sons, Jacaerys Velaryon and Lucerys Velaryon decide to deliver messages of fealty to Winterfell, the Eyrie, and Storm's End. Reprise of Rhaenyra's Theme, Velaryon Theme, Main Theme, and Dragon's Theme	3:16
43.	"Bloodlines Will Burn"	Aemond Targaryen Theme. "The Black Queen": Lucerys Velaryon and his dragon, Arrax, are chased from Storm's End by Aemond Targaryen and Vhagar, and subsequently killed; Daemon Targaryen delivers the news of his death to Rhaenyra Targaryen. Reprise of Rhaenyra's Theme, Rhaenyra's Choral Melody, and Dragon's Theme.	4:25
44.	"The Promise"	"The Black Queen": End credits. Reprise of The Prince That Was Promised Theme and Main Theme.	2:11
Total length:			123:05

== Reception ==
Ramin Djawadi's score received acclaim from critics and audiences alike, and has been noted as the show's best aspects. GamesRadar+ writer Molly Edwards had stated that the soundtrack "has been consistently brilliant, just as it was across Game of Thrones, with a perfectly balanced mix of old and new themes". Eric Kain, senior writer for Forbes, had called the score for the seventh episode (and overall season) had "some of the most gorgeous music that Ramin Djawadi has ever written, for this or any other show including Game of Thrones and Westworld." Alec Bojabad of Den of Geek, reviewing the ninth episode of the series, had stated "composer Ramin Djawadi dusts off his “big episode piano” for an unnerving stringy score that harkens back to the astonishing music of season 6's 'The Winds of Winter'." While the reuse of the Game of Thrones title theme in the second episode onwards had been praised by fans, Belen Edwards of Mashable called the decision as "the greatest flaw" as she said: "The song itself still proves to be the ultimate hype man for an hour of fantasy TV goodness. But recycling it for the Game of Thrones prequel reads as a calculated nostalgia grab for fans of the original show. Worse, it suggests that the creative team behind House of the Dragon isn't quite ready to let this new series stand by itself. With a new opening sequence and theme song, House of the Dragon could have asserted its own identity as a series."

== Live concert tour ==
Speaking of the live concert performance, Djawadi earlier said to The Recording Academy, that he did not conduct a concert tour for Game of Thrones until the sixth season in 2017. Though, House of the Dragon is still in its first season, there is much of the score that would be feasible for a concert performance; Djawadi had said about the possibilities of a future concert tour for House of the Dragon, stating that "it was very special to connect with the audience. I'm always in my studio by myself, and being out there and seeing the reactions from the crowd when you play those epic scenes along with the music was fantastic."

== See also ==
- Music of Game of Thrones
