= Driftmark =

- House of the Dragon episode
- Episode no.: Season 1 Episode 7
- Directed by: Miguel Sapochnik
- Written by: Kevin Lau
- Cinematography by: Fabian Wagner
- Editing by: Tim Porter
- Original air date: October 2, 2022
- Running time: 59 minutes

Episode chronology
| ← Previous "The Princess and the Queen" | Next → "The Lord of the Tides" |
- House of the Dragon season 1

"Driftmark" is the seventh episode of the first season of the fantasy drama television series House of the Dragon, a prequel to Game of Thrones. The episode was written by Kevin Lau and directed by showrunner and executive producer Miguel Sapochnik. It first aired on HBO and HBO Max on October 2, 2022.

The plot follows Laena Velaryon's funeral at Driftmark; Aemond claiming Laena's dragon Vhagar which leads to a fight between him and Baela, Rhaena, Jacaerys and Lucerys, resulting in Aemond losing his left eye; and continued speculation surrounding Rhaenyra and Laenor's sons as bastards.

In the United States, the episode achieved a viewership of nearly 1.9 million during its premiere night on linear television alone. It received highly positive reviews from critics, who praised Sapochnik's direction, the opening funeral scene, Aemond claiming Vhagar, the fight between Aemond and other children, the midnight confrontation, the closing plot twist, and performances of the cast, particularly Olivia Cooke. Nevertheless, some critics took issue with the lighting, dubbing the night scene unduly dark.

== Plot ==
King Viserys and his court attend Lady Laena Velaryon's funeral in Driftmark. While there, Rhaenyra, secretly grieving her paramour Ser Harwin Strong's death, is reunited with her uncle and Laena's widower, Daemon. Daemon and Viserys are also reunited, though Daemon declines to reconcile with his brother and return to King's Landing. Larys Strong, the new Lord of Harrenhal, also attends as one of Alicent's courtiers. Prince Aegon becomes drunk and is dragged away by Otto after the latter catches him in a stupor. Meanwhile, a grieving Laenor refuses to speak to his wife and retreats inside the castle.

During the night, Rhaenyra and Daemon meet on the beach and become physically intimate. Prince Aemond sneaks out and claims Laena's dragon Vhagar as his own, demonstrating skill in handling the beast. Aemond's cousins and nephews angrily confront him, with Laena's daughter Rhaena enraged that Vhagar was taken from her. An altercation results in Luke slashing Aemond's left eye with a knife. All the royal children are brought before King Viserys. Queen Alicent demands Luke's eye be taken as retribution. When Viserys refuses to permit such an act, a distraught Alicent grabs his Valyrian steel dagger and lunges at Luke. Rhaenyra blocks her, but Alicent wounds the princess' arm. Viserys considers the matter settled when Aemond says gaining the dragon was a fair exchange for losing an eye.

Aemond claims that Rhaenyra's children are bastards, and Viserys further decrees that anyone doubting his grandsons' legitimacy will lose their tongue. Princess Rhaenys privately urges Lord Corlys to pass his title and name through their granddaughter, Baela, rather than allow Laenor to pass it on to his sons. Corlys turns away from his wife in anger when she once again urges him to put aside his ambitions for the Iron Throne, stating that "history does not remember blood. It remembers names." Hearing of the attack on his wife, Laenor pledges to Rhaenyra that he will serve her faithfully as Prince Consort, despite both admitting that they still do not truly love each other.

Reinstated Hand of the King, Otto Hightower is impressed with Alicent's ruthless nature and says that they will soon prevail. Daemon and Rhaenyra agree to unite against Alicent and her supporters. Rhaenyra wants them to marry, but both know this is impossible while Laenor is still alive. Daemon secretly visits Laenor's lover Ser Qarl Correy with a proposition. Claiming that Laenor looks down on him, Qarl challenges him to a duel in High Tide's hall, appearing to murder Laenor. Lord Corlys and Princess Rhaenys later find a charred body in the hearth, believing it to be their son. Daemon and Rhaenyra expect to be blamed for Laenor's death but agree that this will only make others fear them. They then marry in the old Valyrian tradition, their respective children in attendance. Qarl boards a ship leaving Driftmark accompanied by a disguised Laenor, as Daemon had secretly given them enough gold to run away together.

== Production ==
=== Writing ===
"Driftmark" was written by Kevin Lau, marking his first time in the Game of Thrones franchise. The title of the episode refers to the island of Driftmark, which is the seat of House Velaryon and the primary location of the episode's plot.

=== Filming ===
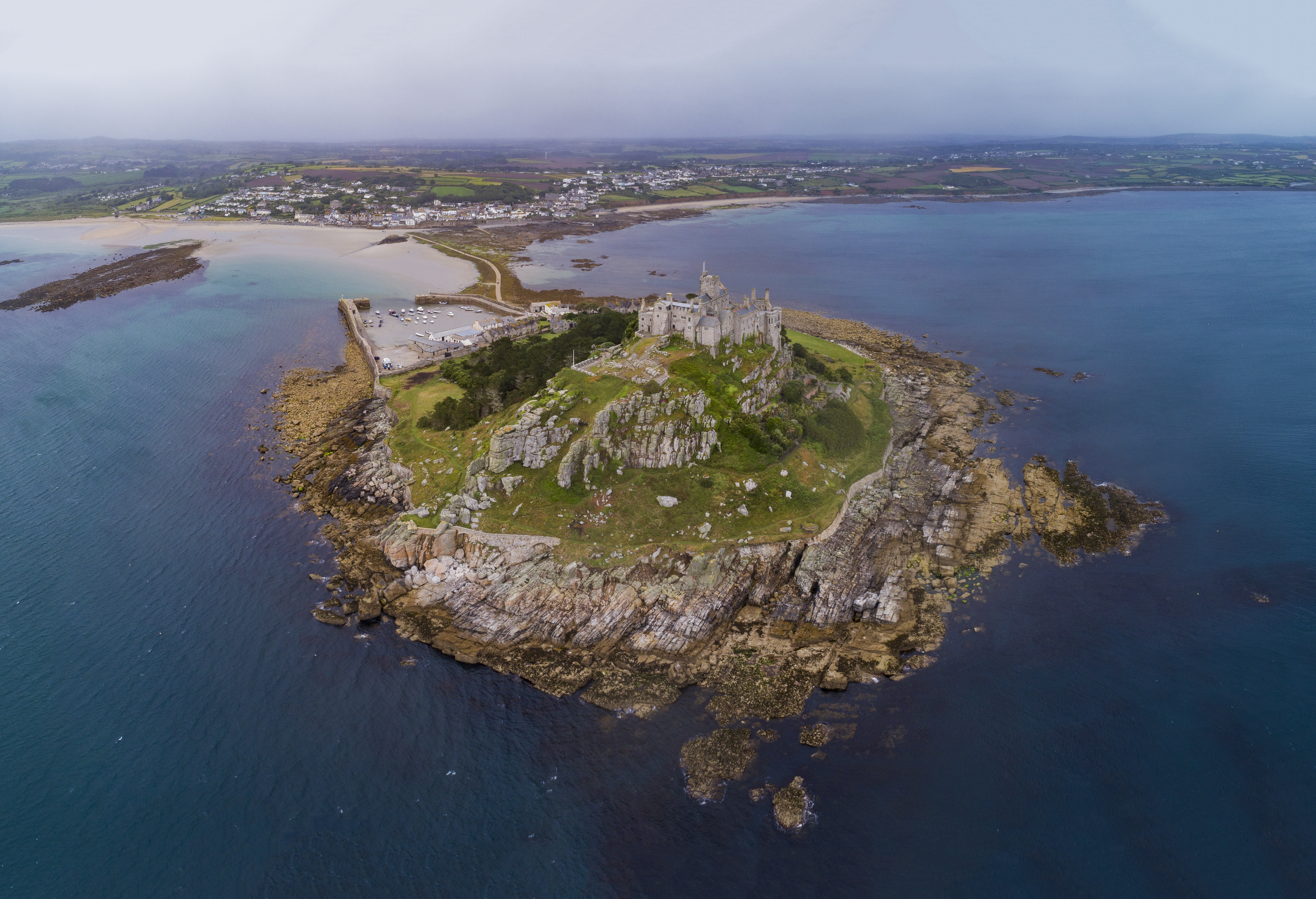
St. Michael's Mount island in England was reimagined as the location for Driftmark.

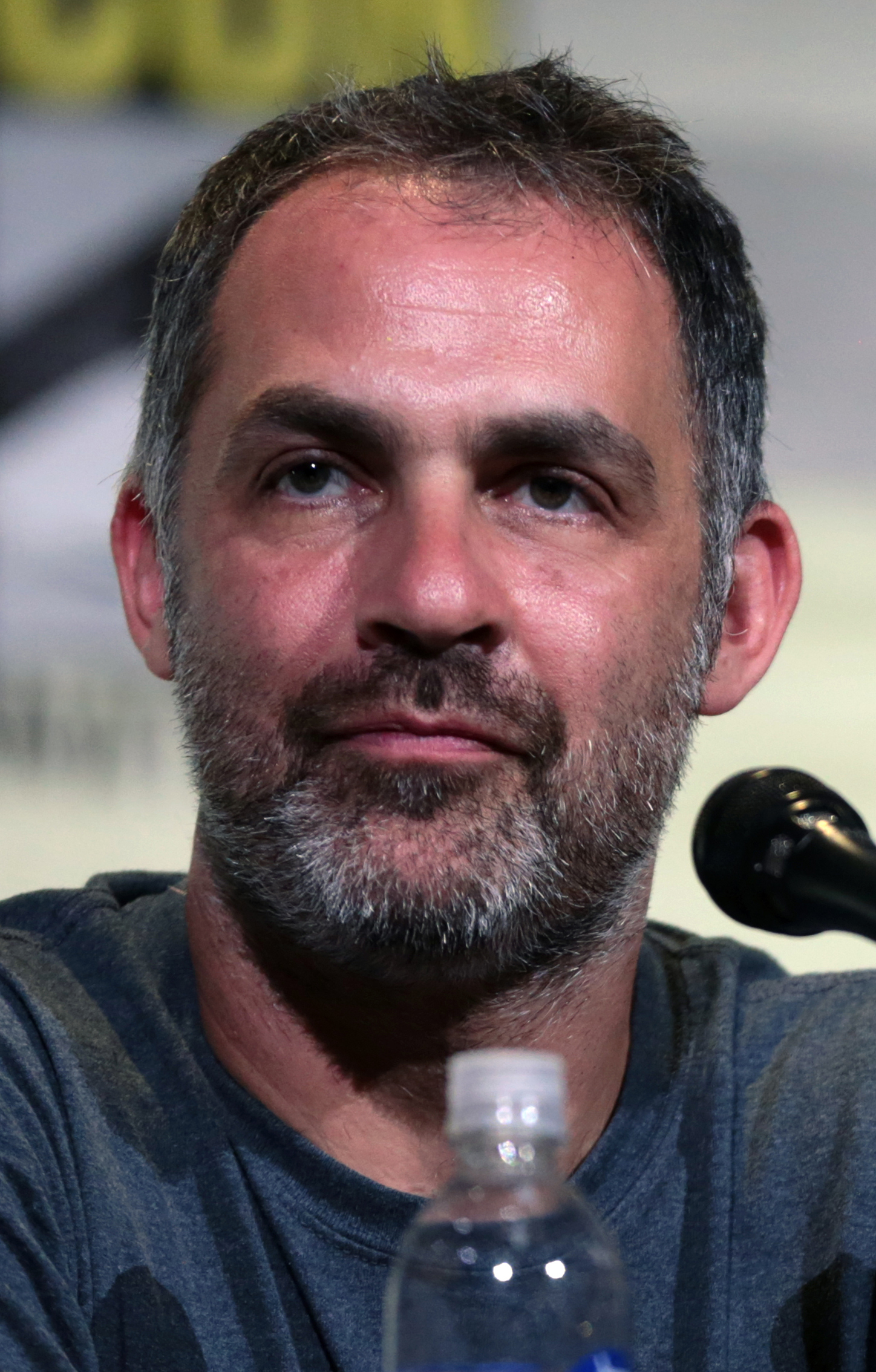
The episode marks Miguel Sapochnik's final directing work for the Game of Thrones franchise.

The episode was directed by showrunner and executive producer Miguel Sapochnik, making it his third directorial credit for the series, after "The Heirs of the Dragon" and "The Princess and the Queen". It also marks his ninth and last time for the overall franchise, following his departure as showrunner before the production of season two.

Among the filming locations, St. Michael's Mount island, in Mount's Bay, Cornwall, England served as the location for Driftmark.

=== Casting ===
The episode stars Paddy Considine as King Viserys I Targaryen, Matt Smith as Prince Daemon Targaryen, Olivia Cooke as Queen Alicent Hightower, Emma D'Arcy as Princess Rhaenyra Targaryen, Rhys Ifans as Ser Otto Hightower, Steve Toussaint as Lord Corlys Velaryon, Eve Best as Princess Rhaenys Targaryen, Fabien Frankel as Ser Criston Cole, Graham McTavish as Ser Harrold Westerling, and Matthew Needham as Larys "Clubfoot" Strong.

It marks the final appearance of Ty Tennant, Evie Allen, Leo Ashton, Leo Hart, Harvey Sadler, Shani Smethurst, and Eva Ossei-Gerning as the young versions of Aegon, Helaena, Aemond, Jacaerys, Lucerys, Baela, and Rhaena, respectively, due to the time jump between this and the succeeding episode, in which the adult version of the seven characters is each portrayed by Tom Glynn-Carney, Phia Saban, Ewan Mitchell, Harry Collett, Elliot Grihault, Bethany Antonia, and Phoebe Campbell.

== Reception ==
=== Ratings ===
In the United States, an estimated 1.88 million viewers watched "Driftmark" during its first broadcast on HBO on October 2, 2022.

=== Critical response ===
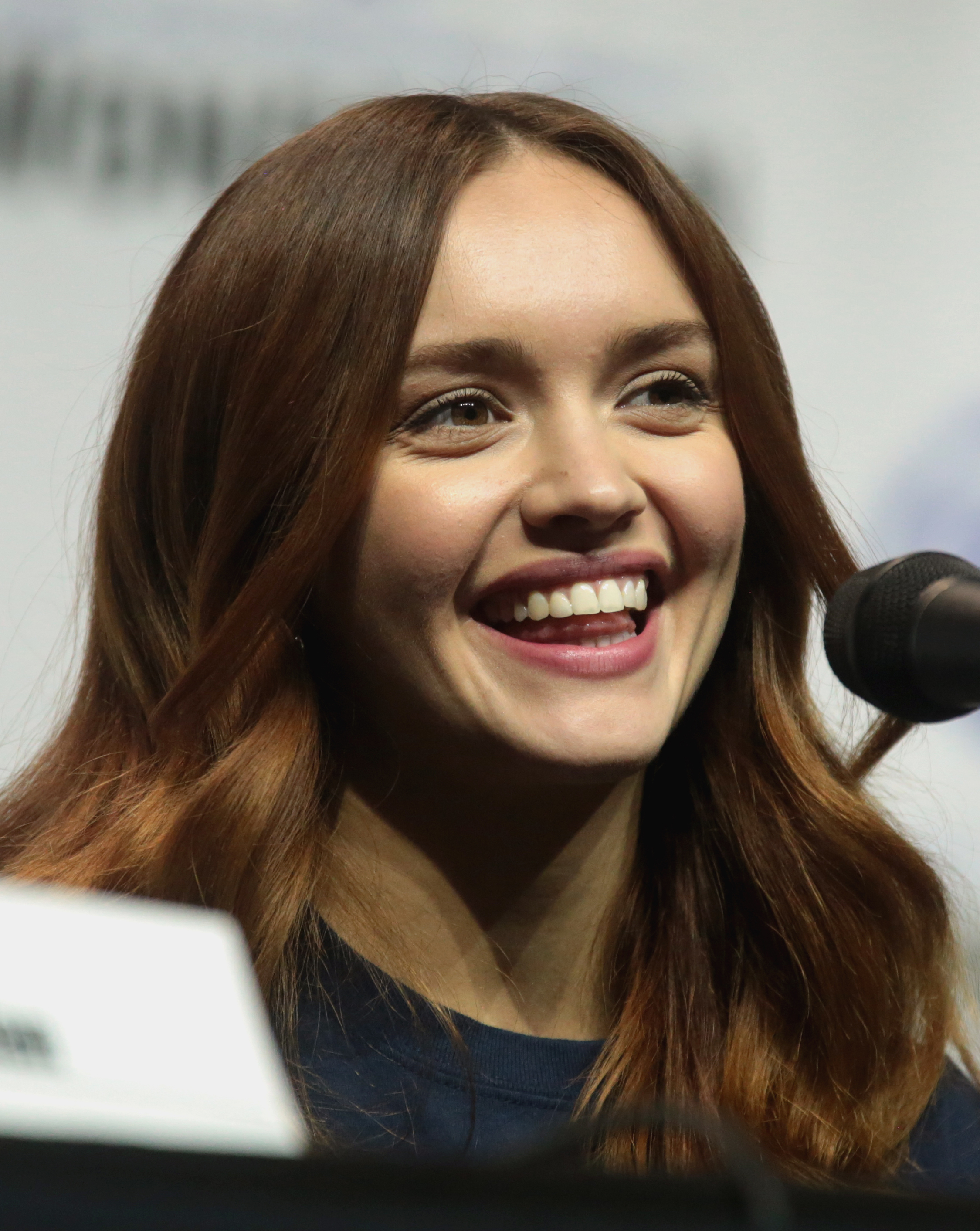
Olivia Cooke's performance in the episode received critical acclaim.

The episode received highly positive reviews. On the review aggregator Rotten Tomatoes, it holds an approval rating of 93% based on 30 reviews, with an average rating of 7.4/10. The website's critical consensus said, "While the copious day for night cinematography will prompt viewers to adjust their brightness settings, 'Driftmark' is an exceedingly satisfying excursion into family spats and taboo reunions."

Writing Den of Geek, Alec Bojalad gave it a rating of 4.5 out of 5 stars, praising the opening funeral scene, set design, sound design, pacing, performances, Djawadi's score, and Sapochnik's direction, and called it a "visually-staggering, well-crafted, and tonally-perfect hour of television." It received 4 out of 5 stars from Michael Deacon of The Telegraph, Hillary Kelly of Vulture, and Jack Shepherd of GamesRadar+. Deacon deemed it "another strong episode, crackling with tension and conflict" and highlighted the fight scene between Aemond and Jacaerys, Lucerys, Baela, and Rhaena, as well as the midnight meeting scene. Kelly singled out the scene of Aemond bonding with Vhagar, the pacing (which is considered an improvement from the previous episode), and also the fight scene (especially the choreography), calling it "a clever mirror of how the adults handle the same accusations and slights." Shepherd wrote in his verdict: "A tense wake leads to a bloody showdown in which children try to murder each other. It's blindingly good television", and praised Cooke's performance. Reviewing for IGN, Helen O'Hara gave it an "amazing" 9 out of 10 score and summarized it in her verdict: "An expert blend of darkness and light – except in the cinematography – this is a drama-packed, satisfyingly character driven triumph. You could cut the tension with a knife – and the odd eye too."
