= The Lord of the Tides =

- House of the Dragon episode
- Episode no.: Season 1 Episode 8
- Directed by: Geeta Vasant Patel
- Written by: Eileen Shim
- Cinematography by: Catherine Goldschmidt
- Editing by: Chris Hunter
- Original air date: October 9, 2022
- Running time: 68 minutes

Episode chronology
| ← Previous "Driftmark" | Next → "The Green Council" |
- House of the Dragon season 1

"The Lord of the Tides" is the eighth episode of the first season of the fantasy drama television series House of the Dragon, a prequel to Game of Thrones. The episode was written by Eileen Shim and directed by Geeta Vasant Patel. It first aired on HBO and HBO Max on October 9, 2022.

The episode features a six-year time jump after the previous episode and depicts the discussion in King's Landing regarding Lord Corlys Velaryon's successor as "the Lord of the Tides", initiated by his brother Ser Vaemond Velaryon's disapproval of the previously-approved successor, Corlys' grandson, Lucerys; King Viserys' deteriorating health leading to his death; and the announcement of the betrothals of Jacaerys Velaryon and Baela Targaryen as well as Lucerys Velaryon and Rhaena Targaryen.

In the United States, the episode gained a viewership of 1.7 million during its premiere night on linear television alone. It garnered highly positive reviews from critics, particularly for its direction, writing, pacing, and performances of the cast, especially Paddy Considine, who was considered the highlight of the episode. It received two Emmy Award nominations for its cinematography and prosthetic makeup. Several publications named it as one of the best episodes of the series and among the best television episodes of 2022.

"The Lord of the Tides" introduced several new cast members, including Tom Glynn-Carney, Phia Saban, Ewan Mitchell, Harry Collett, Bethany Antonia and Phoebe Campbell as the adult versions of Aegon, Helaena, Aemond, Jacaerys, Baela and Rhaena, respectively. It marks the final appearance of Wil Johnson as Ser Vaemond Velaryon.

== Plot ==
Six years have passed, and House Velaryon's succession is jeopardized when Corlys Velaryon is severely wounded in the Stepstones fighting the Triarchy. His younger brother, Vaemond, petitions the crown, wanting to be named Corlys' heir, proclaiming that Prince Lucerys, Rhaenyra's second-born and Corlys' heir apparent, is not Laenor Velaryon's legitimate son, thus should not be the heir to Driftmark.

Rhaenyra and Daemon, fearing that the suit could further weaken their position, return to the capital to represent Luke. Upon their arrival, they notice the Red Keep is now austere and grim, reflecting the Faith of the Seven that Queen Alicent embraces. The now elderly King Viserys—bedridden, disfigured, and mentally muddled—is gladdened to meet Rhaenyra and Daemon's sons Aegon the Younger and Viserys the Younger. All royal matters are now overseen by Alicent and the King's Hand, Otto Hightower, who keep Viserys quiescent with milk of the poppy.

Talya, Alicent's lady-in-waiting, is revealed to be a spy employed by Daemon's former mistress Mysaria, now a wealthy madam and the alleged "White Worm" of King's Landing. Prince Aegon, now married to his sister Helaena, rapes a handmaiden, which Alicent covers up, admonishing Aegon after.

In an attempt to gain Rhaenys' support, Rhaenyra proposes that her sons Jacaerys and Lucerys marry Rhaenys' granddaughters, Baela and Rhaena. Rhaenys declines, not wanting to lose the favor of the Hightowers. Later, Rhaenyra pleads for Viserys to defend her succession to the throne, quoting Aegon the Conqueror's prophetic dream about the "Prince That Was Promised".

Vaemond presents his petition to the court with Otto seeming prepared to rule against Luke. Rhaenyra's defense is interrupted by Viserys who, frail and barely ambulatory, arrives and sits the Iron Throne, with Daemon's help. With Rhaenys' support, Luke is reaffirmed as the heir to Driftmark. Enraged, Vaemond calls Rhaenyra a whore and her three elder sons bastards. Viserys is angered and declares he will have Vaemond's tongue for such an insult, but Daemon draws his sword and decapitates Vaemond.

During a feast, Viserys implores everyone in the royal family to make amends. In response, Rhaenyra toasts Queen Alicent for lovingly caring for Viserys. Alicent, in turn, toasts Rhaenyra, proclaiming she will make a good queen. Exhausted but happy to see his family harmonious, Viserys retires to bed. Soon after, however, Aemond provokes Rhaenyra's sons and a fight ensues, only stopping upon Daemon's intervention. Rhaenyra, still in good faith, takes her family back to Dragonstone.

Viserys, on his deathbed, mistakes Alicent for Rhaenyra and mutters parts of Aegon the Conqueror's dream which Alicent misinterprets as Viserys wanting their son, Aegon, to succeed him as king. Viserys calls out to his "love", his late wife Aemma, as he passes away.

== Production ==
=== Writing and filming ===
"The Lord of the Tides" was directed by Geeta Vasant Patel and written by Eileen Shim, marking their first time in the Game of Thrones franchise.

The title of the episode refers to the title held by Lord Corlys Velaryon as the episode focuses on the discussion of his successor.

=== Casting ===
The episode stars Paddy Considine as King Viserys I Targaryen, Matt Smith as Prince Daemon Targaryen, Olivia Cooke as Queen Alicent Hightower, Emma D'Arcy as Princess Rhaenyra Targaryen, Rhys Ifans as Ser Otto Hightower, Eve Best as Princess Rhaenys Targaryen, Fabien Frankel as Ser Criston Cole, Sonoya Mizuno as Mysaria, Graham McTavish as Ser Harrold Westerling, Jefferson Hall as Ser Tyland Lannister, Harry Collett as Prince Jacaerys Velaryon, Tom Glynn-Carney as Prince Aegon II Targaryen, Ewan Mitchell as Prince Aemond Targaryen, Bethany Antonia as Lady Baela Targaryen, Phoebe Campbell as Lady Rhaena Targaryen, and Phia Saban as Princess Helaena Targaryen.

It marks the first appearance of Collett, Glynn-Carney, Mitchell, Antonia, Campbell, and Saban as the adult version of their respective characters, in addition to Elliot Grihault as adult Prince Lucerys Velaryon, succeeding Leo Hart, Ty Tennant, Leo Ashton, Shani Smethurst, Eva Ossei-Gerning, Evie Allen, and Harvey Sadler who portrayed the young version of the seven characters, respectively, in the sixth and seventh episodes, following a plot jump of six years after the previous episode. Of the seven actors, Grihault was the only one not featured in the opening credits, but instead in the closing credits. In addition, it also marks the final appearance of Wil Johnson as Ser Vaemond Velaryon.

== Reception ==
=== Ratings ===
In the United States, an estimated 1.73 million viewers watched "The Lord of the Tides" during its first broadcast on HBO. Around 2.4 million viewers watched the episode across its four broadcasts during its premiere night.

=== Critical response ===
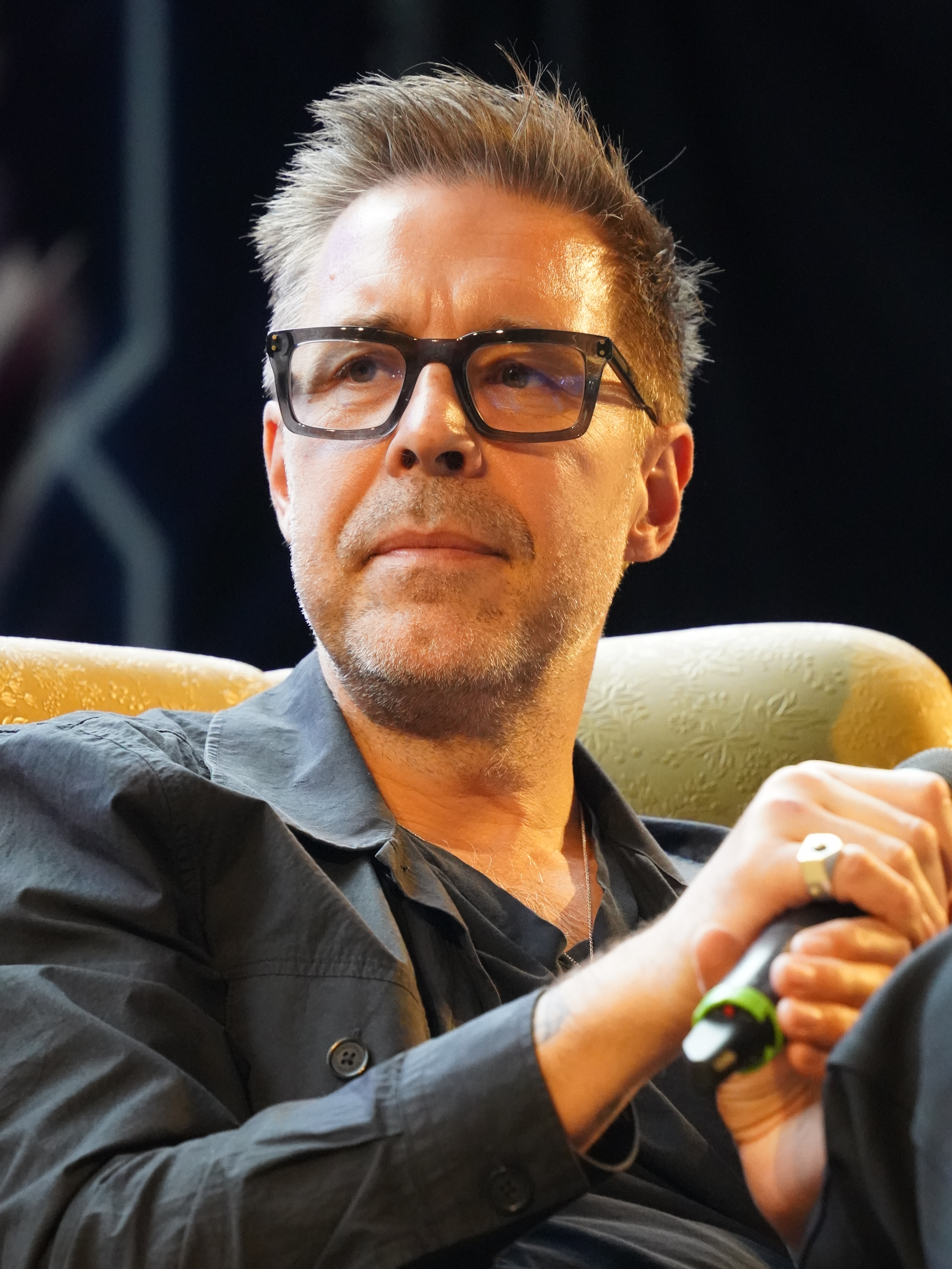
Paddy Considine's performance in the episode was widely praised by critics.

The episode received highly positive reviews from critics. On the review aggregator Rotten Tomatoes, it holds an approval rating of 91% based on 34 reviews, with an average rating of 7.3/10. The website's critical consensus said, "The family comes together for a short-lived truce in 'The Lord of the Tides,' a mournful installment that spotlights Paddy Considine's moving performance as the ailing King Viserys." It received an "amazing" score of 9 out of 10 from Helen O'Hara of IGN, a rating of 4.5 out of 5 stars from Alec Bojalad of Den of Geek, and an "A-" grade from Jenna Scherer of The A.V. Club. In her review, O'Hara noted it as "a smart, well-written, and character-driven episode that once again shifts the show forward in time without entirely losing the plot." Bojalad called it "an exciting [and] effective episode of television." Scherer deemed it "the series' best episode to date."

Considine's performance was singled out by many critics as the highlight of the episode. Oliver Vandervoort of Game Rant said that he "does a phenomenal job of playing someone who knows that his days are growing short and who just wants to take in his family." Additionally, Bojalad called the performance "transcendent", while Scherer considered it Emmy-worthy. TVLine named Considine the "Performer of the Week" for his performance in this episode for the week of October 15, 2022. The site wrote, "Considine's excellent turn as the decrepit royal in his final days will live in perpetuity. [...] [His] genius lay in the way he allowed Viserys' physical decline to be the catalyst for the king's emotionally stripped-down plea to his fractured family. [...] So many props to Considine for making the conflicted, complicated man someone on whose words we hung until the very end."

Several critics highlighted Viserys' speech during the family dinner at the Red Keep. Daniel Van Boom of CNET said that it was "a great speech" and his presence was "classic Game of Thrones quality stuff." Furthermore, the dinner scene itself also received praise. Bojalad named it "[the series'] finest hour, and maybe one of the best scenes ever in the Game of Thrones franchise." The scene in the Great Hall when Viserys walked across the room to reach the Iron Throne was also praised, with Scherer saying, "Viserys' slow, agonizing journey across the throne room makes for a stunning set piece, richly earned by all the episodes we've spent watching him waffle and demure [sic] in the face of high stakes." Sarah Milner of /Film listed the scene as one of "the moments that defined TV in 2022." In addition, critics also praised Patel's direction, Shim's writing, Cooke and D'Arcy's on-screen chemistry, and the performances of Best, Cooke, D'Arcy, Mitchell, and Smith.

"The Lord of the Tides" was included in many publications' list of the best TV episode of 2022. Mashable named it the third best TV episode of the year. British GQ ranked it the fourth best episode of the year and wrote, "This was the episode in which House of the Dragon finally proved its worth, paying off the ruthless politicking of the season before it in spades, elevated by an all-timer of a performance from Paddy Considine." Meanwhile, Decider and Entertainment Weekly included the episode in their unranked lists.

=== Accolades ===
| Year | Award | Category | Nominee | Result | Ref. |
|---|---|---|---|---|---|
| 2023 | American Society of Cinematographers Awards | Outstanding Achievement in Cinematography in Episode of a Series for Non-Commercial Television | Catherine Goldschmidt | Nominated | |
| 2023 | Primetime Emmy Awards | Outstanding Cinematography for a Series (One Hour) | Catherine Goldschmidt | Nominated | |
| 2023 | Primetime Emmy Awards | Outstanding Prosthetic Makeup | Barrie Gower, Sarah Gower, Emma Faulkes, Duncan Jarman and Paula Eden | Nominated | |
