= The Black Queen (House of the Dragon) =

- House of the Dragon episode
- Episode no.: Season 1 Episode 10
- Directed by: Greg Yaitanes
- Written by: Ryan Condal
- Cinematography by: Pepe Avila del Pino
- Editing by: Crispin Green; Tim Porter
- Original air date: October 23, 2022
- Running time: 59 minutes

Episode chronology
← Previous "The Green Council"	Next → "A Son for a Son"
- House of the Dragon season 1

"The Black Queen" is the tenth and final episode of the first season of the fantasy drama television series House of the Dragon, a prequel to Game of Thrones. The episode was written by series co-creator and co-showrunner Ryan Condal and directed by Greg Yaitanes. It first aired on HBO and HBO Max on October 23, 2022. Two days before it aired, the episode leaked online and was shared among many fans on illegal torrent websites.

The plot depicts Princess Rhaenys's arrival at Dragonstone from King's Landing to deliver the news of King Viserys's death. Rhaenyra is subsequently crowned Queen of the Seven Kingdoms and opposes her faction's demands for open war, instead wanting to secure alliances. Her son, Lucerys, is sent to Storm's End to gain Baratheon support for Rhaenyra's cause. At Storm's End, Lucerys meets and is harassed by his uncle Aemond; Aemond loses control of his dragon Vhagar, who kills Lucerys. Daemon informs Rhaenyra of her son's death.

In the United States, the episode achieved a viewership of 9.3 million during its premiere night, with nearly 1.9 million viewers on linear television alone. It received critical acclaim, with praise going towards the writing, musical score, cliffhanger, and set-up for the next season, the whole sequence in Storm's End, and performances of the cast, especially those of Emma D'Arcy and Matt Smith.

The episode marks the final appearance of Elliot Grihault as Prince Lucerys Velaryon.

== Plot ==
Rhaenyra comforts Luke, who frets about being heir to Driftmark. Rhaenys arrives to inform Rhaenyra and Daemon of Viserys's death and Aegon usurping the throne. Shocked by the news, Rhaenyra goes into a difficult premature labour and gives birth to a stillborn daughter. Believing Viserys was murdered, Daemon forms an alliance of Houses still loyal to him and urges Rhaenyra to declare war against the Greens. Erryk Cargyll, having escaped King's Landing, arrives on Dragonstone bringing Viserys' crown to Rhaenyra; Daemon proclaims her Queen of the Seven Kingdoms.

A peace delegation headed by Otto Hightower delivers Aegon's peace terms along with a personal memento from Alicent, offering Rhaenyra, her family, and supporters amnesty if she swears fealty to Aegon. Rhaenyra considers the offer, wishing to keep the realm united against the threat foretold by Aegon the Conqueror's dream. Daemon, jealous that Viserys shared the prophecy with Rhaenyra and not him, dismisses it and briefly chokes Rhaenyra in anger. Rhaenys persuades her ailing husband, Lord Corlys Velaryon, to support Rhaenyra's faction.

At a war council, Corlys offers his fleet to establish a shipping blockade of King's Landing with Rhaenys patrolling the area on dragonback. Rhaenyra sends Jace and Luke as envoys to secure the support of Houses Arryn, Stark, and Baratheon. Aware that dragons may be the Blacks' major advantage, Daemon enters the caverns beneath the Dragonmont and rouses a sleeping dragon.

Luke travels to Storm's End on his dragon Arrax to meet with Lord Borros Baratheon. He discovers Prince Aemond is already there with his dragon Vhagar. Luke relays Rhaenyra's message, reminding Borros that his late father swore an oath to support her succession. Borros reveals that Aegon has already offered a political alliance, betrothing Aemond to one of his daughters, which Rhaenyra's sons, both already betrothed, cannot offer. Borros refuses Rhaenyra's appeal and sends Luke away.

Luke refuses Aemond's demand that he sacrifice his own eye as retribution for taking Aemond's years earlier, provoking the latter into drawing his weapon. Borros forbids the two from fighting inside his hall and permits Luke to safely depart on Arrax, though Aemond pursues them on Vhagar. Caught in a severe storm, both princes briefly lose control of their dragons. Against the wishes of Luke, Arrax attacks Vhagar, and she retaliates by devouring both Arrax and Luke against a horrified Aemond's commands.

== Production ==
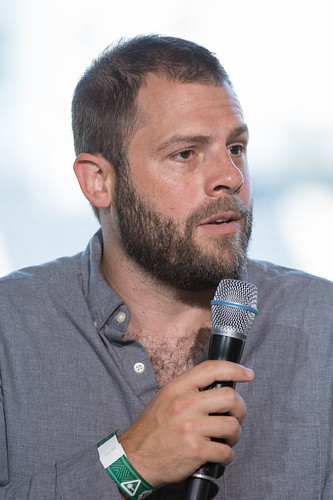
Co-showrunner Ryan Condal wrote the season finale.

=== Writing ===
"The Black Queen" was written by series co-creator and co-showrunner Ryan Condal, marking his fourth writing credit for the series, following "The Heirs of the Dragon", "The Rogue Prince", and "Second of His Name".

The title of the episode refers to Rhaenyra, who is crowned queen, ruling over the faction to be later known as "the Blacks".

=== Filming ===
The episode was directed by Greg Yaitanes, making it his third time as director for the series after "The Rogue Prince" and "Second of His Name".

=== Casting ===
The episode stars Matt Smith as Prince Daemon Targaryen, Emma D'Arcy as Princess Rhaenyra Targaryen, Rhys Ifans as Ser Otto Hightower, Steve Toussaint as Lord Corlys Velaryon, Eve Best as Princess Rhaenys Targaryen, Harry Collett as Prince Jacaerys Velaryon, Ewan Mitchell as Prince Aemond Targaryen, Bethany Antonia as Lady Baela Targaryen, and Phoebe Campbell as Lady Rhaena Targaryen. Following the death of Prince Lucerys Velaryon, the episode marks the final appearance of Elliot Grihault.

== Reception ==
=== Ratings ===
In the United States, "The Black Queen" was watched by a total of 9.3 million viewers, which included linear viewers during its premiere night on October 23, 2022, both on HBO and HBO Max, making it the network's most-watched season finale since the series finale of its predecessor Game of Thrones. While on HBO alone, it was watched by an estimated 1.85 million viewers during its first broadcast. This rose to 2.72 million viewers after a week.

=== Critical response ===
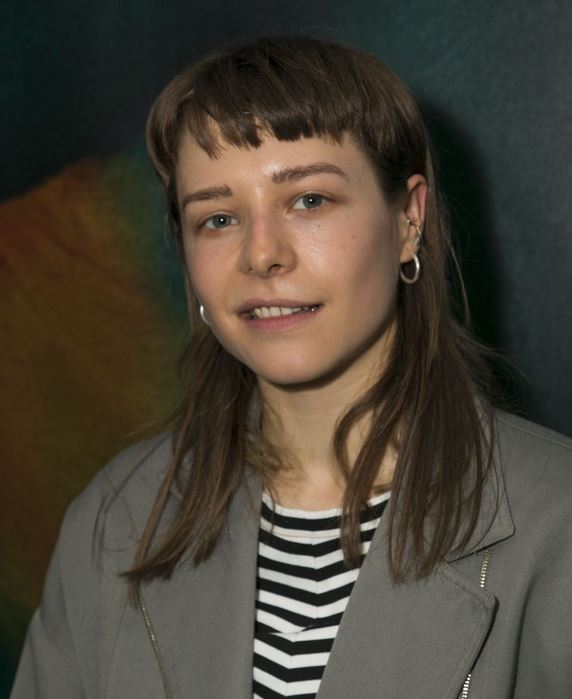
Emma D'Arcy's performance in the episode was widely praised by critics.

The episode was met with acclaim from critics.

On the review aggregator website Rotten Tomatoes, 93% of 42 critics' reviews are positive, with an average rating of 8.3/10. The website's consensus reads: "Culminating in a spectacular and tragic dance of dragons amidst a storm, 'The Black Queen' is a visually splendid capper to House of the Dragon's inaugural season."

It received a rating of 5 out of 5 stars from Tom Percival of The Digital Fix, 4.5 out of 5 stars from Alec Bojalad of Den of Geek, Molly Edwards of GamesRadar+ and Oliver Vandervoort of Game Rant, and 4 out of 5 stars from Ed Power of The Telegraph and Hillary Kelly of Vulture. Percival said that it was "a wonderfully compelling cliffhanger to leave the first season on" and an "excellent conclusion" to the season. Edwards wrote in her verdict: "The season finale is another rock-solid episode, with dragons, disaster, and excellent performances from the cast." In his review, Power stated, "with its series finale, House of the Dragon has emphatically seized the crown [...] and effortlessly taken up on the baton from Game of Thrones. As the curtain came down on its debut season, it was confirmed that it has the potential to soar as high as Thrones at its finest." Reviewing for IGN, Helen O'Hara gave it an "amazing" score of 9 out of 10 and wrote in her verdict, "It's been a sometimes slow-burning first season to House of the Dragon, but the emotional impact of this finale shows that all that ground-laying has established characters to care about and invest in. It also kicks off the Dance of the Dragons in earnest with the best action scene of the season." Erik Kain of Forbes called it "a tremendous and powerful season finale" and that it "surpassed every expectation". Cameron Frew of Dexerto deemed it "breathtaking television" and considered the overall series "the best TV show of 2022".

Critics praised the performances of its cast, particularly D'Arcy, Grihault, Mitchell, and Smith, with the former being singled out as the highlight of the episode. The New York Times's Jeremy Egner found D'Arcy's performance "brilliant", TV Fanatic's Paul Dailly regarded it as "one of the most striking performances in franchise history", while CBR's Lissete Lanuza Sáenz called it Emmy-worthy. TVLine named D'Arcy the "Performer of the Week" for their performance in the episode, for the week of October 29, 2022. The site specifically singled out three scenes, namely Rhaenyra's giving birth scene, the discussion in the Chamber of the Painted Table, and the final scene of Rhaenyra reacting to her son's death. For the latter scene, the site wrote, "D'Arcy filled their character with an aura of vengeful resolve. That face when they turned toward the camera at the end of the episode? Like so much of D'Arcy’s showing in the season-ender: Chills." Particular scenes that were singled out by critics were Rhaenyra's coronation as queen, the whole sequence in Storm's End, especially Aemond chasing after Lucerys amid a rainstorm, and the final scene. Several critics praised the change in Aemond's characterization from the source material, for which he did not intend to kill Lucerys. Bojalad pointed out the decision as a way to humanize Aemond, who was a far more violent and sadistic character in the book. Other aspects of the episode that were highlighted by critics included Yaitanes' direction, Djawadi's musical score, and the set-up for season two.

IGN included the episode in its "Best TV Episodes of 2022" list.

=== Accolades ===
Year	Award	Category	Nominee	Result	Ref.
2023	Primetime Emmy Awards	Outstanding Sound Editing for a Comedy or Drama Series (One Hour)	Al Sirkett, Tim Hands, Adele Fletcher, Paula Fairfield, David Klotz, Timeri Duplat, Mathias Schuster, Barnaby Smyth and Paula Boram	Nominated	
2023	Visual Effects Society Awards	Outstanding Visual Effects in a Photoreal Episode	Angus Bickerton, Nikeah Forde, Sven Martin, Michael Bell and Michael Dawson	Nominated	
2023	Visual Effects Society Awards	Outstanding Compositing & Lighting in an Episode	Kevin Friederichs, Sean Raffel, Florian Franke, and Andreas Steinlein	Nominated	
