= The Green Council =

- House of the Dragon episode
- Episode no.: Season 1 Episode 9
- Directed by: Clare Kilner
- Written by: Sara Hess
- Cinematography by: Alejandro Martínez
- Editing by: Crispin Green
- Original air date: October 16, 2022
- Running time: 58 minutes

Episode chronology
← Previous "The Lord of the Tides"	Next → "The Black Queen"
- House of the Dragon season 1

"The Green Council" is the ninth and penultimate episode of the first season of the fantasy drama television series House of the Dragon, a prequel to Game of Thrones. The episode was written by Sara Hess and directed by Clare Kilner. It first aired on HBO and HBO Max on October 16, 2022.

The plot follows the aftermath of Viserys' death in King's Landing, starting with a discussion of Viserys' last words heard by Alicent in the previous episode regarding Aegon the Conqueror's dream, which she misinterprets as Viserys wanting their son Prince Aegon to be his successor. It ends with the coronation of Aegon, which leads to Rhaenys intruding the ceremony with her dragon Meleys.

In the United States, "The Green Council" garnered a viewership of 1.5 million during its premiere night on linear television alone. It was met with mostly positive reviews, with critics praising the character development, pacing, tension, musical score, shock value, set-up for the finale, and performances, particularly those of Eve Best, Olivia Cooke, Tom Glynn-Carney, and Rhys Ifans.

== Plot ==
Alicent tells Otto that King Viserys' dying wish (which she misinterpreted) was that their son Aegon succeed him rather than his daughter and chosen heir, Rhaenyra. Otto delays publicly announcing the king's death and convenes a Small Council meeting. Alicent, Ser Harrold Westerling, and Lord Lyman Beesbury are stunned that Otto and the other council members have secretly plotted to crown Aegon as king. Lord Beesbury protests, denouncing the others as traitors, but Ser Criston kills him, seemingly by accident. Alicent refuses her father's insistence that Rhaenyra and her children should be executed, and Ser Harrold resigns as Lord Commander rather than carry out such an order. Criston is then named to replace him. Mysaria learns of the king's death through a signal from her spy, Talya.

Otto and Alicent separately race to find and influence Aegon, who has fled the Red Keep. Otto sends two Kingsguard knights, twin brothers Ser Erryk and Ser Arryk Cargyll to search the city, while Criston and Prince Aemond assist Alicent. In Flea Bottom, the Cargyll twins check a fighting arena Aegon frequents, where children, including Aegon's own bastard offspring, are forced into mortal combat as entertainment. An intermediary leads them to Mysaria who is willing to hand over the captive Aegon in exchange for a crackdown on the fighting pits and oversight of her spy network. The Cargylls find Aegon, but Criston and Aemond intercept them. Alicent mandates that Rhaenyra be given the chance to renounce her claim to the throne.

Otto summons several lords and ladies of the realm, coercing them into breaking off their pledges of support to Rhaenyra and swearing allegiance to Aegon; those who refuse to do so are imprisoned or put to death. Lord Larys Strong, in his role as Lord Confessor, obtains the identity of the White Worm, and learns of Otto's dealings. He passes this on to Alicent, who instructs him to have Mysaria's brothel burned to the ground. Alicent tries to win over Princess Rhaenys Targaryen's support, holding her captive in the Red Keep, but Rhaenys refuses and mocks her for her submission to the men in her life. Erryk, recognizing that Aegon will be nothing more than a puppet king, decides to flee the city, taking Rhaenys with him.

At Aegon’s coronation in the Dragonpit, Otto announces Viserys' death and Aegon is crowned king by Criston before the smallfolk. Rhaenys, separated from Erryk among the crowds, enters the Dragonpit's lower caverns, mounting her dragon, Meleys. Rhaenys and Meleys then burst through dragonpit's floor, causing death and destruction and threatening the royal family before flying away.

== Production ==
=== Writing ===
"The Green Council" was written by Sara Hess, marking her second episode as writer for the series, following "The Princess and the Queen".

The title of the episode refers to the Small Council, arranged secretly by Otto Hightower to secure Aegon's position as heir to the Iron Throne, which excludes Lord Lyman Beesbury and Queen Alicent, with the 'green' being a reference to the color of House Hightower.

=== Filming ===
The episode was directed by Clare Kilner, making it her third directorial credit for the series after "King of the Narrow Sea" and "We Light the Way". The whole episode took place in King's Landing, which was filmed in the walled city of Plasencia, Cáceres, Spain.

=== Casting ===
The episode stars Paddy Considine as King Viserys I Targaryen, Olivia Cooke as Queen Dowager Alicent Hightower, Rhys Ifans as Ser Otto Hightower, Eve Best as Princess Rhaenys Targaryen, Fabien Frankel as Ser Criston Cole, Sonoya Mizuno as Mysaria, Graham McTavish as Ser Harrold Westerling, Matthew Needham as Lord Larys "Clubfoot" Strong, Jefferson Hall as Ser Tyland Lannister, Tom Glynn-Carney as Prince Aegon II Targaryen, Ewan Mitchell as Prince Aemond Targaryen, and Phia Saban as Princess Helaena Targaryen.

It marks the final appearance of Bill Paterson, whose character, Lord Lyman Beesbury, died in the episode.

== Reception ==
=== Ratings ===
In the United States, an estimated 1.56 million viewers watched "The Green Council" during its first broadcast on HBO. Around 2.2 million viewers watched the episode across its four broadcasts on premiere night.

=== Critical response ===
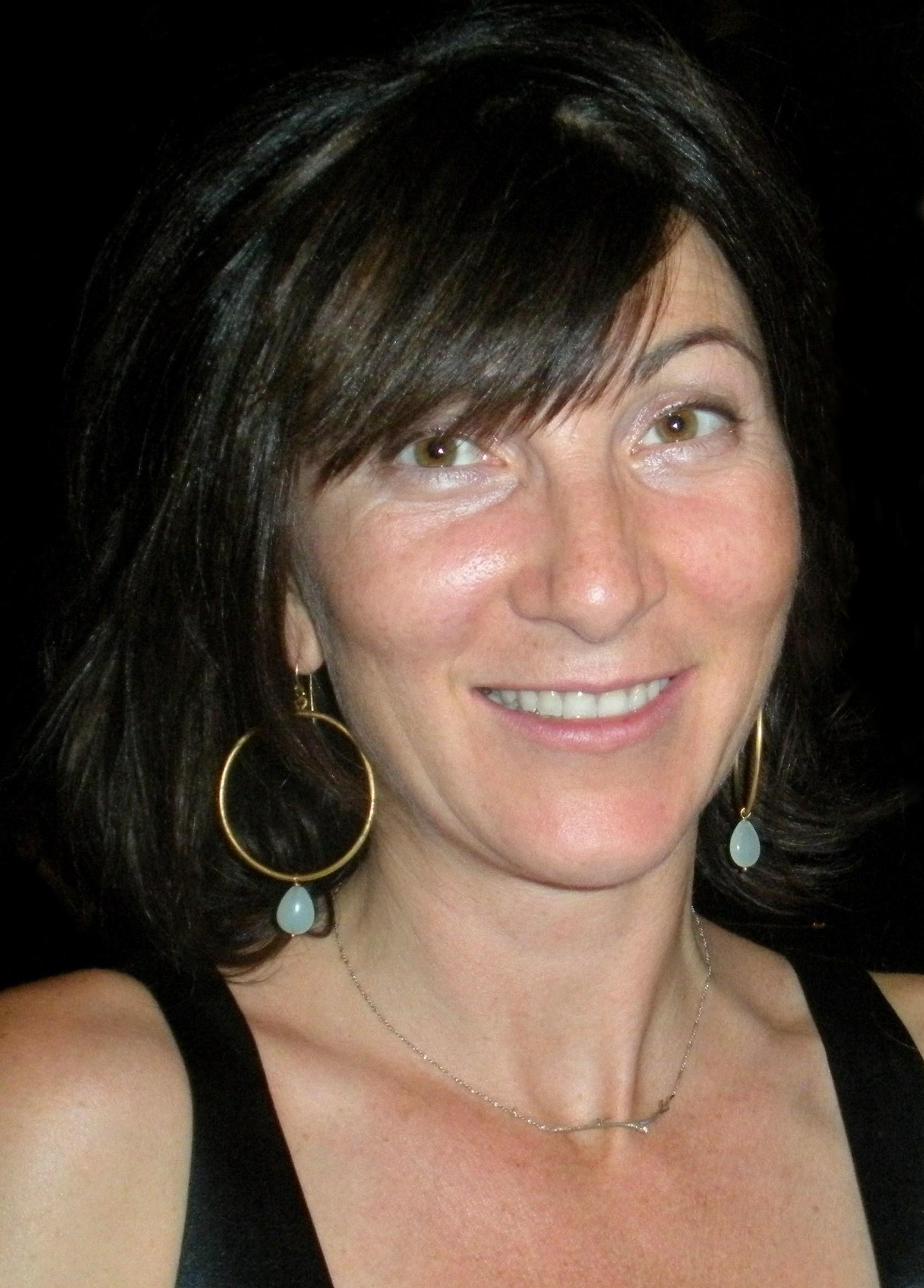
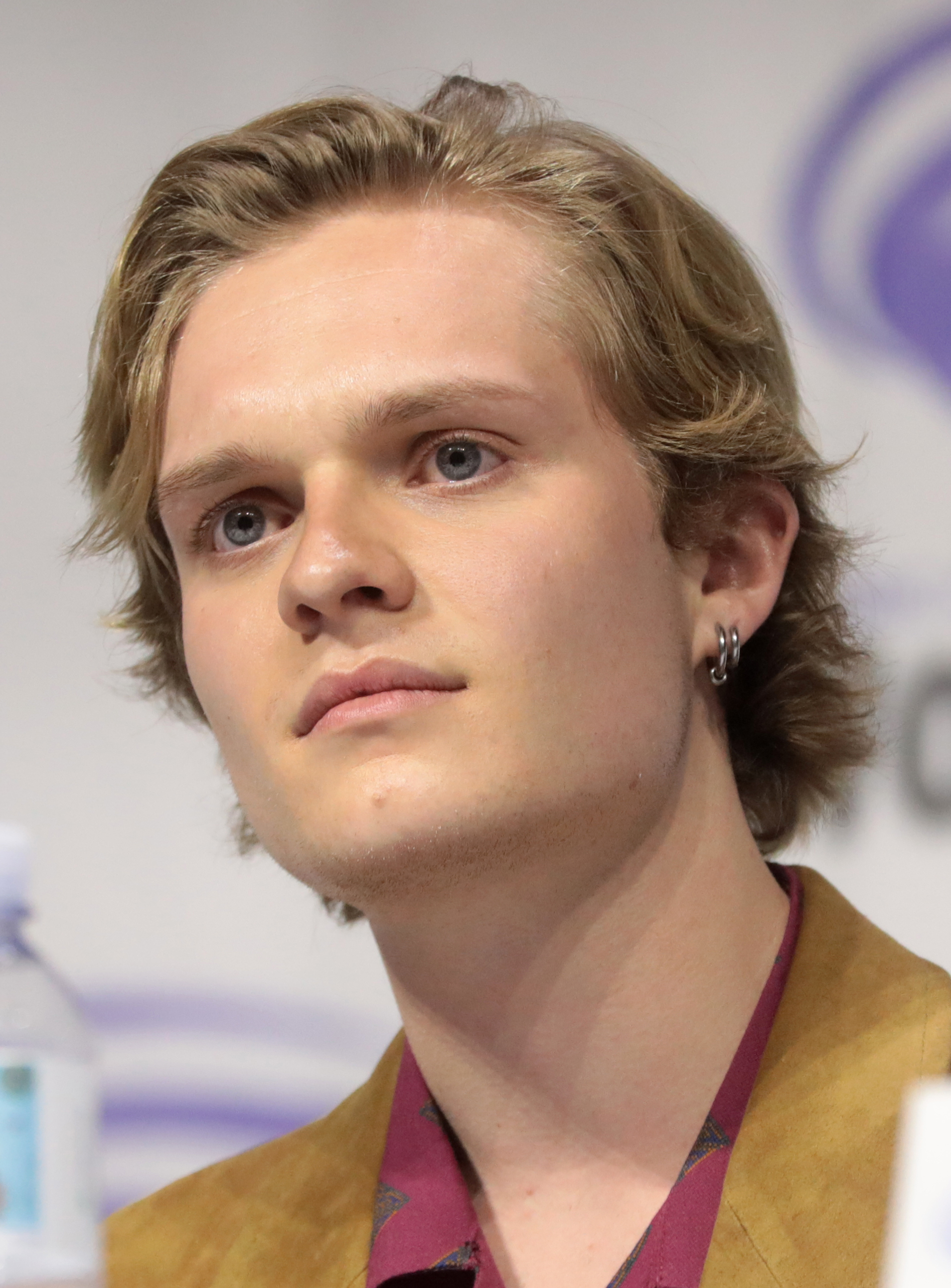
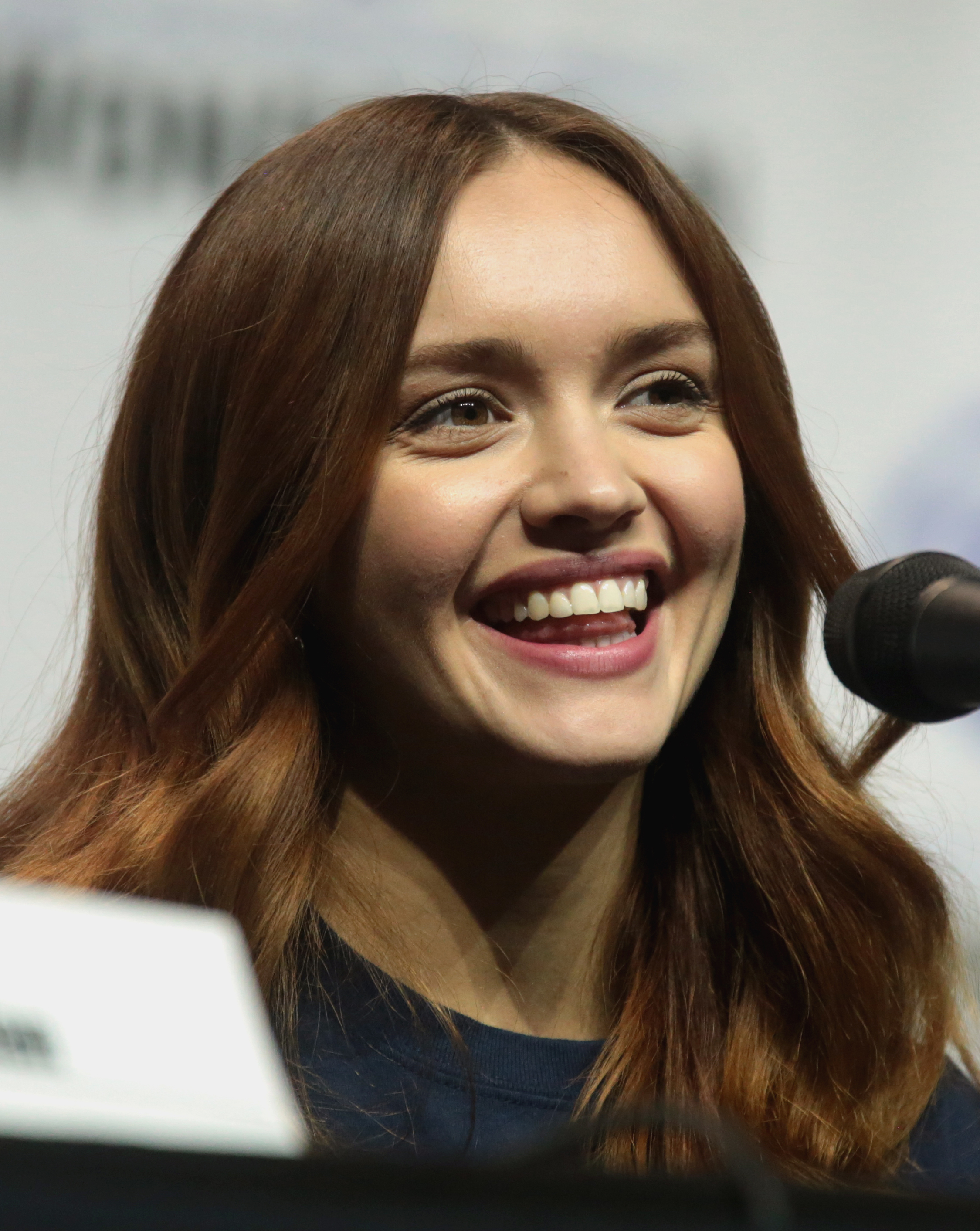
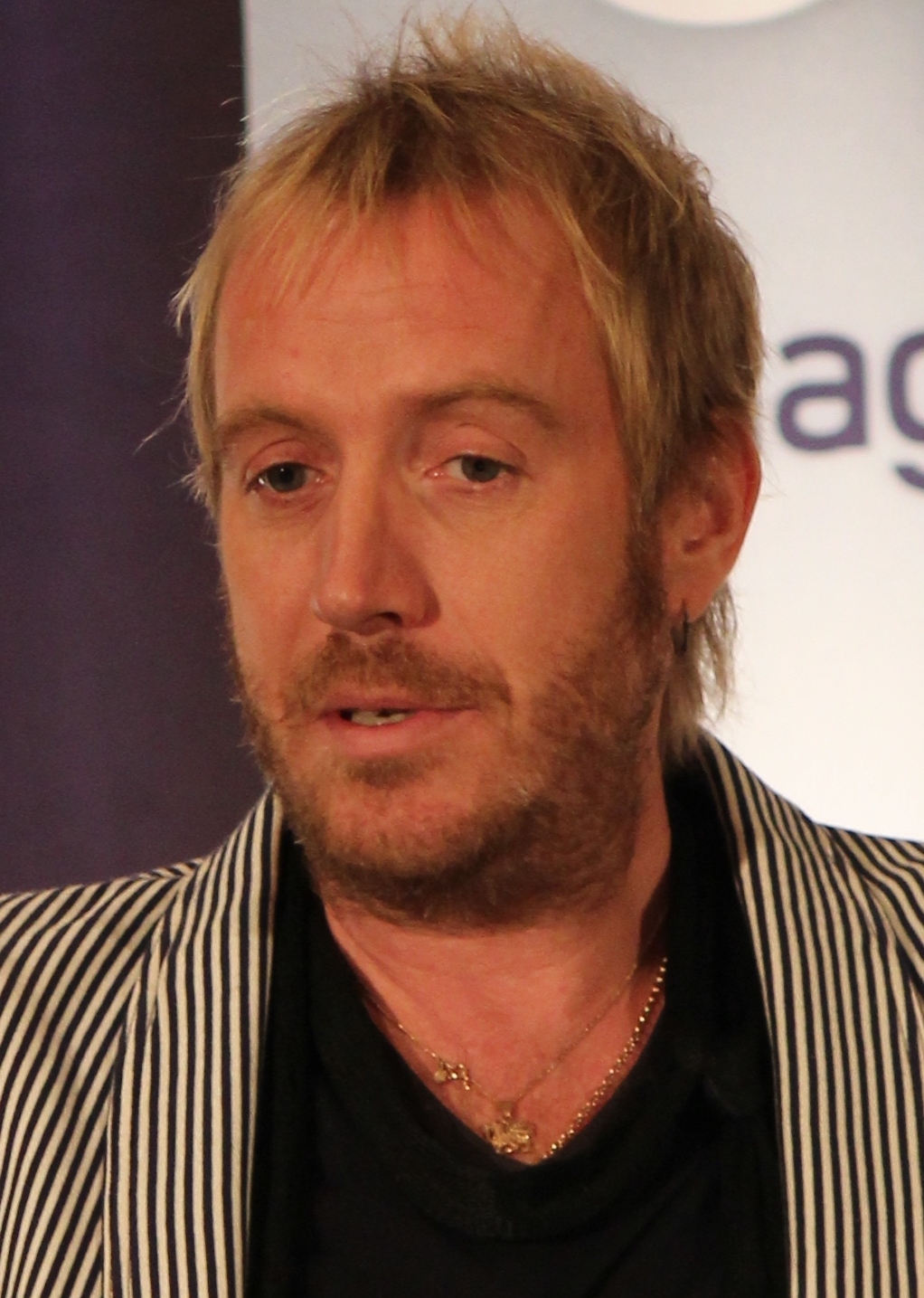
The performances of (top, L to R) Eve Best, Tom Glynn-Carney, Olivia Cooke, and Rhys Ifans in the episode garnered critical acclaim.

The episode received mostly positive reviews from critics. On the review aggregator Rotten Tomatoes, it holds an approval rating of 85% based on 33 reviews, with an average rating of 7.8/10. The website's critical consensus said, "Beginning with conspiratorial whispers and ending with a roaring declaration of war, 'The Green Council' is a discomfortingly suspenseful kickoff to the long-awaited Dance of Dragons."

It received a rating of five out of five stars from Molly Edwards of GamesRadar+, who wrote in her verdict: "A season's worth of plotting and planning comes to a head in a stunning episode that's all about the greens, culminating in a dazzling ending that tees up the fire and blood to come, and four out of five stars from Michael Deacon of The Telegraph, Alec Bojalad of Den of Geek, and Jordan Russell Lyon of Ready Steady Cut. Deacon said that "the episode set us up expertly for whatever horrors lie in store during next week's season finale", Bojalad called it "another worthwhile step in an increasingly worthwhile story", while Lyon summarized the episode by saying "[Despite] there isn't much action, the tension between the characters, namely Rhaenys and Alicent, is excellent to see." Helen O'Hara of IGN gave it an "amazing" score of 9 out 10 and wrote in her verdict, "...this is an episode fuelled by fear and uncertainty, and particularly by Alicent's grief, worry and determination to protect her family. But there's plotting aplenty to keep us hooked, and actions that will have huge consequences for the Targaryen clan and Westeros as a whole." Jenna Scherer of The A.V. Club graded it with a "B+" and said, "'The Green Council' is a tense chess game of an episode, kicking off the power vacuum that we knew was coming the moment Viserys breathed his last." Erik Kain of Forbes called it "another brilliant episode of a show that is growing more brilliant with each passing episode," and further wrote in his verdict, "War is coming. Up to this point, House of the Dragon has expertly set the stage of the coming conflict, introducing us not only to the players of the game, but to the myriad fraught relationships, alliances and enmities that have led to the factions we now have arrayed before us."

Several critics highlighted the character developments of Alicent, Otto, Aemond, and Rhaenys. Bojalad wrote about Otto's development: "He receives his supervillain glow up in this hour in superb, satisfying fashion", and about Rhaenys': "She has proven herself to be a logical thinker when it comes to the game of thrones." Deacon wrote about Aemond's "lust for power" and deemed it "an excellent development, as it opens up an exciting new front for future conflict." Particular scenes that were singled out by many critics include the conversation between Alicent and Rhaenys; the coronation of Aegon Targaryen; and the final scene of Rhaenys' intrusion in the middle of the coronation with her dragon Meleys. The opening scene depicting the situation in the Red Keep right after Viserys' death was also praised, particularly for Djawadi's musical score, which was compared to his previous work in the Game of Thrones episode "The Winds of Winter". Critics also praised the performances of Best, Cooke, Glynn-Carney, and Ifans. For Best, Scherer wrote, "Best's performance has been one of the most quietly commanding in the show, and this is another showcase of her talents; the temperament in her delivery is chilling. In addition, other aspects of the episode that received praise from critics are the pacing, tension, shock value, visual effects, and the set-up for the finale.

=== Accolades ===
Year	Award	Category	Nominee	Result	Ref.
2023	American Society of Cinematographers Awards	Outstanding Achievement in Cinematography in Episode of a Series for Non-Commercial Television	Alejandro Martinez	Nominated	
