= 2022 American Society of Cinematographers Awards =

2023 ceremony awarding excellence in cinematography

37th ASC Awards
- Date: March 5, 2023
- Site: The Beverly Hilton, Beverly Hills
- Hosted by: Ben Mankiewicz

The 37th American Society of Cinematographers Awards were held and livestreamed worldwide on March 5, 2023, at The Beverly Hilton in Beverly Hills, California, to honor the best cinematographers of film and television in 2022. For her work on Elvis, Mandy Walker became the first woman to win for Theatrical Feature Film.

The nominees were announced on January 9, 2023. Actress Viola Davis received the Board of the Governors Award in honor of her "groundbreaking contributions to the cinematic space".

== Winners and nominees ==
Winners are listed first and in bold.

=== Film ===
Theatrical Feature Film	Spotlight Award
**Mandy Walker, ASC, ACS – Elvis**; Roger Deakins, ASC, BSC – Empire of Light; Greig Fraser, ASC, ACS – The Batman; Darius Khondji, ASC, AFC – Bardo, False Chronicle of a Handful of Truths; Claudio Miranda, ASC – Top Gun: Maverick	**Sturla Brandth Grøvlen, DFF – War Sailor**; Kate McCullough, ISC – The Quiet Girl; Andrew Wheeler – God's Country

=== Television ===
Episode of a One-Hour Non-Commercial Television Series	Episode of a One-Hour Commercial Television Series
**M. David Mullen, ASC – The Marvelous Mrs. Maisel (Episode: "How Do You Get to Carnegie Hall?") (Prime Video)**; John Conroy, ASC, ISC – Westworld (Episode: "Années Folles") (HBO / HBO Max); Catherine Goldschmidt – House of the Dragon (Episode: "The Lord of the Tides") (HBO / HBO Max); Alejandro Martinez – House of the Dragon (Episode: "The Green Council") (HBO / HBO Max); Alex Nepomniaschy, ASC – The Marvelous Mrs. Maisel (Episode: "Everything Is Bellmore") (Prime Video); Nikolaus Summerer – 1899 (Episode: "The Calling") (Netflix)	**Jules O'Loughlin – The Old Man (Episode: "IV") (FX)**; Marshall Adams, ASC – Better Call Saul (Episode: "Saul Gone") (AMC); Jesse M. Feldman – Interview with the Vampire (Episode: "Is My Very Nature That of a Devil") (AMC); Christian "Tico" Herrera, CCR – Snowfall (Episode: "Departures") (FX); Jaime Reynoso, AMC – Snowpiercer (Episode: "Bound by One Track") (TNT)
Pilot, Limited Series, or Motion Picture Made for Television	Episode of a Half-Hour Television Series
**Sean Porter – The Old Man (Episode: "I") (FX)**; Todd Banhazl, ASC – Winning Time: The Rise of the Lakers Dynasty (Episode: "The Swan") (HBO / HBO Max); Jeremy Benning, CSC – Guillermo del Toro's Cabinet of Curiosities (Episode: "The Outside") (Netflix); Anastas Michos, ASC, GSC – Guillermo del Toro's Cabinet of Curiosities (Episode: "The Autopsy") (Netflix); C. Kim Miles, ASC, CSC, MySC – Lost Ollie (Episode: "Bali Hai") (Netflix)	**Carl Herse – Barry (Episode: "starting now") (HBO / HBO Max)**; Adam Bricker – Hacks (Episode: "The Click") (HBO / HBO Max); Stephen Murphy BSC, ISC – Atlanta (Episode: "New Jazz") (FX); Ula Pontikos, BSC – Russian Doll (Episode: "Matryoshka") (Netflix); Christian Sprenger, ASC – Atlanta (Episode: "Andrew Wyeth. Alfred's World.") (FX)

=== Documentary ===
- **Ben Bernhard and Riju Das – All That Breathes**
  - Adam Bricker – Chef's Table: Pizza (Episode: "Franco Pepe")
  - Wolfgang Held, ASC – This Stolen Country of Mine
