= Viserys I Targaryen =

Fictional character

- A Song of Ice and Fire character House of the Dragon character
- Paddy Considine as Viserys I Targaryen in the first season of House of the Dragon
- First appearance: Literature: The Princess and the Queen (2013); Television: "The Heirs of the Dragon" (2022)
- Last appearance: Television: "The Red Sowing" (2024)
- Created by: George R. R. Martin
- Adapted by: Ryan Condal and George R. R. Martin (for House of the Dragon)
- Portrayed by: Paddy Considine

In-universe information
- Alias: The Young King
- Gender: Male
- Titles: Prince of Dragonstone; King of the Andals, the Rhoynar, and the First Men; Lord of the Seven Kingdoms; Protector of the Realm
- Family: House Targaryen
- Spouses: Aemma Arryn (cousin); Alicent Hightower
- Children: with Aemma Arryn: Rhaenyra Targaryen; Baelon Targaryen; with Alicent Hightower: Aegon II Targaryen; Helaena Targaryen; Aemond Targaryen; Daeron Targaryen
- Relatives: Baelon Targaryen (father); Alyssa Targaryen (mother); Daemon Targaryen (brother); Aegon Targaryen (brother)

Viserys I Targaryen is a fictional character in American author George R. R. Martin's the A Song of Ice and Fire series of epic fantasy novels, appearing in the 2013 novella The Princess and the Queen, the 2014 novella The Rogue Prince and the 2018 novel Fire & Blood. In the HBO television adaptation House of the Dragon, he is portrayed by English actor Paddy Considine.

Viserys was the fifth king from the Targaryen dynasty to sit on the Iron Throne, ruling from 103 AC to 129 AC. He inherited the throne from his grandfather Jaehaerys I Targaryen, who had lost several previous heirs of his own issue. He is the older brother of Prince Daemon Targaryen, husband of queens Aemma Arryn and Alicent Hightower, and father of Queen Rhaenyra Targaryen and King Aegon II Targaryen. Ruling in a peacetime period, Viserys remained open-minded and approachable in addressing problems across the realm, and many lords and smallfolk praised him for his generosity. He hosted many tournaments, balls, and banquets in the Red Keep, a source of both unity and division depending on the occasion. He was not very physically active like Daemon, and dealt with various health problems that continued to worsen towards the end of his reign. The issue of succession caused much friction in Viserys' court, as he struggled to stabilize relations between the green faction led by Alicent and black faction led by Rhaenyra. Following Viserys' death, this friction exploded into the Targaryen civil war known as the Dance of the Dragons, with the blacks supporting Rhaenyra's claim to the throne and the greens supporting Aegon II's claim.

Viserys' official character description depicts him as a "level-headed decision maker" who presided over a peaceful, but challenging reign.

Both the character of Viserys and Considine's performance received universal acclaim, many deeming him the best character in the show and one of the best characters in the Game of Thrones universe, as well as an improvement on his book counterpart.

== In the books ==
Viserys was born in 77 AC as the eldest son of Prince Baelon Targaryen and his sister-wife Princess Alyssa Targaryen. Nine days after he was born, Alyssa took Viserys riding on her dragon Meleys. Viserys' younger brother Daemon was born in 81 AC, followed by a difficult labor for Alyssa when she delivered her third son Aegon, which resulted in both of their deaths within the year. Viserys claimed the legendary but elderly dragon Balerion at age sixteen in 93 AC, flying the dragon around King's Landing with great difficulty. Balerion would die a year later in 94 AC, and Viserys would never claim another dragon again.

In the same year he claimed Balerion, Viserys married his cousin Aemma Arryn, though the marriage was not consummated for another two years when Aemma turned thirteen. The two had difficulty producing a child in their early marriage, as Aemma suffered several miscarriages and gave birth to a son who passed away in infancy. Ultimately, Aemma gave birth to their daughter Princess Rhaenyra in 97 AC. Baelon passed away in 101 AC, which led King Jaehaerys Targaryen to call the Great Council of 101 AC to determine the heir to the throne. As Baelon's son, Viserys' claim to the throne prevailed over the claims of Laenor Velaryon, Princess Rhaenys Targaryen, and Laena Velaryon by a rumored vote of 20-1. Following Jaehaerys' passing in 103 AC, Viserys ascended the throne and became the fifth king to rule over the Seven Kingdoms.

Viserys inherited the stability and prosperity of Jaehaerys' 55-year rule, with a full treasury and friendly relations between great houses across the realm. House Targaryen experienced the peak of its power during Viserys' rule, as it had the most dragons and family members recorded since the infamous Doom of Valyria. Viserys' accession was honored in a great tourney at Maidenpool in 104 AC, where the knight Ser Criston Cole defeated the fearsome Daemon in rounds of melee and joust. Seeking to maintain the warmth exuded by Jaehaerys, Viserys had the eight-year old Rhaenyra serve as his cupbearer and accompany him at large social gatherings, where she was beloved and nicknamed "The Realm's Delight".

Viserys appointed Daemon as the Master of Coin and later Master of Laws in his small council, where Daemon had a bitter rivalry with the Hand of the King Ser Otto Hightower. To diffuse the tension, Viserys appointed Daemon as the Commander of the City Watch. Otto was still fearful of Daemon potentially succeeding Viserys, and attempted to convince Viserys to name Rhaenyra as his heir. Viserys refused his proposal, and asserted that he and Aemma would have a male son for an heir soon enough. In 105 AC, Aemma perished while giving birth to their son Baelon, who passed away a day later. Following the tragedy, Daemon was heard making drunken comments about Baelon being the "heir for a day" on the Street of Silk, which infuriated Viserys. He officially declared Rhaenyra as the Princess of Dragonstone and his living heir over Daemon at a grand ceremony, with hundreds of lords and knights swearing allegiance to her claim while Daemon fled the capital in anger.

Following Aemma's death, various members of Viserys' court suggested that he remarry. Though several suggested that he marry the young Laena to stabilize relations between House Targaryen and House Velaryon, Viserys ultimately chose to wed Otto's daughter Lady Alicent Hightower. The two were married in 106 AC, as Rhaenyra poured wine for her new stepmother while Alicent referred to Rhaenyra as her "daughter". This relationship soon soured, as Alicent bore Viserys three children in the next four years: Prince Aegon in 107 AC, Princess Helaena in 109 AC, and Prince Aemond Targaryen in 110 AC. Rhaenyra viewed the births of Aegon and Aemond as being dangerous to her claim to the throne, though Viserys did not change the order of succession even with male heirs. This decision upset Otto, which led to Viserys sending Otto back to his family's seat in Oldtown, after which he appointed Lord Lyonel Strong as his replacement.

Two factions began to form within the court, one of which was friendly to Alicent and supportive of her sons' claims to the throne, while the other was supportive of Rhaenyra's claim. On the fifth anniversary of Viserys and Alicent's wedding in 111 AC, Alicent wore a green gown representative of her family's colors, while Rhaenyra wore a black and red dress. From then, Alicent's party was known as the "greens" and Rhaenyra's supporters were labeled the "blacks". At the great ceremonial tourney on that day, Viserys and Daemon reunited after several years apart, as Daemon handed Viserys his crown from the Stepstones. The reunion lasted only for six months, as Viserys exiled Daemon once again for reasons unclear, though Septon Eustace claims that Daemon had seduced Rhaenyra and took her maidenhead. Viserys attempted to stabilize relations between the blacks and greens through various gatherings and respective apologies to each other, asserting that he loved Rhaenyra and Alicent equally.

In 113 AC, Viserys attempted to find a betrothal for Rhaenyra, believing that the time was right for her to marry. Following the advice of his council, Viserys betrothed her to Laenor Velaryon as a way of stabilizing his tense relationship with Lord Corlys Velaryon. Rhaenyra did not want to marry Laenor, but accepted the match when Viserys threatened to change the order of succession should she refuse. The two married in 114 AC, though it is rumored that they never had their marriage consummated as Laenor was rumored to be homosexual. Rhaenyra gave birth to her sons Prince Jacaerys ("Jace"), Prince Lucerys ("Luke"), and Prince Joffrey Velaryon in 114, 115, and 117 AC while Alicent gave birth to her third son Prince Daeron Targaryen in 114 AC, shortly after Jace. Viserys had Jace and Daeron share the same wetnurse to bring Alicent and Rhaenyra closer, while denying the accusations that Rhaenyra's sons were bastards fathered by Ser Harwin Strong instead of Laenor. Daemon and his new wife Laena had twin daughters Baela and Rhaena Targaryen in 116 AC, as Viserys reunited with his brother once again. To improve their relations, Viserys gave his blessing to betrothe Jace to Baela and Luke to Rhaena.

Several tragedies occurred in 120 AC, beginning with Laena's death following a failed birth. Shorty after, Laenor was killed by his rumored lover Ser Qarl Correy in a duel at Driftmark. At his funeral, Aemond got into a violent fight with Jace, Luke and Joffrey after he called the brothers "bastards", which culminated in Aemond losing an eye when Luke attacked him with a knife. This inflamed tensions between the greens and blacks, whose apologies to one another were taken seriously by no one but Viserys. He ordered Harwin to depart Dragonstone for Harrenhal, and issued an edict that anyone who spread rumors of Rhaenyra's sons' illegitimacy would have their tongue cut out. Harwin and his father Lyonel Strong would soon perish in a fire at Harrenhal, with Viserys considered one of the suspects of setting the fire. To replace Lyonel, Viserys recalled Otto to serve him a second time as his Hand. As both Daemon and Rhaenyra were now widows, the two married each other six months later without Viserys' knowledge, which was a large scandal in court. Their first son Prince Aegon was born in 120 AC, while their second son was born in 122 AC and named after Viserys.

In 126 AC, Rhaenyra requested that Luke be recognized as the heir to Driftmark, which several members of House Velaryon protested under the accusation that he was not Laenor's son. As Viserys angrily ordered their tongues to be cut out, he slipped and cut his hand on the Iron Throne, a severe injury that gave him a fever from infection. Some maesters feared that he would die, but Viserys lived after two of his fingers were removed by Maester Gerardys, and he would never sit on the Iron Throne again. Gerardys was recommended by Rhaenyra as a replacement for the dead Grand Maester Mellos, while Alicent recommended Maester Alfador, her family's maester. Viserys decided to appoint neither man as Grand Maester and deferred to the Citadel to fill the office, who chose Maester Orwyle. As Viserys' health gradually weakened, Otto filled the small council with members loyal to the greens, including Lord Larys Strong, Ser Tyland Lannister, and Ser Jasper Wylde. Lord Commander of the Kingsguard Criston Cole was also an ardent supporter of Alicent, with Orwyle being politically neutral and Lord Lyman Beesbury opposing the greens.

Viserys passed away in his sleep in 129 AC, having been discovered by a servant who informed Alicent of his status. In the interim, Alicent did not disclose Viserys' death to the public and summoned the small council to a secret meeting. The small council decided to disregard Viserys' declaration of Rhaenyra as his heir, and conspired to crown Prince Aegon (Viserys' eldest son) as the next king of Westeros. Their precedent to justify Aegon's ascension was the Great Council of 101 AC, where Viserys was chosen over Princess Rhaenys on account of sex. His death was finally revealed to the public a week later, when the silent sisters prepared his body for a cremation ceremony traditional in the Targaryen family. Upon the streets learning of Viserys' passing, a coronation ceremony was held where the greens crowned Aegon as the new Lord of the Seven Kingdoms. Aegon's claim was rejected by a furious Rhaenyra, who had a coronation of her own set up by Daemon and the blacks. The coming struggle for power between Aegon and Rhaenyra came to be known as the Dance of the Dragons, a civil war between the greens and blacks.

== Television adaptation ==
=== Casting and development ===
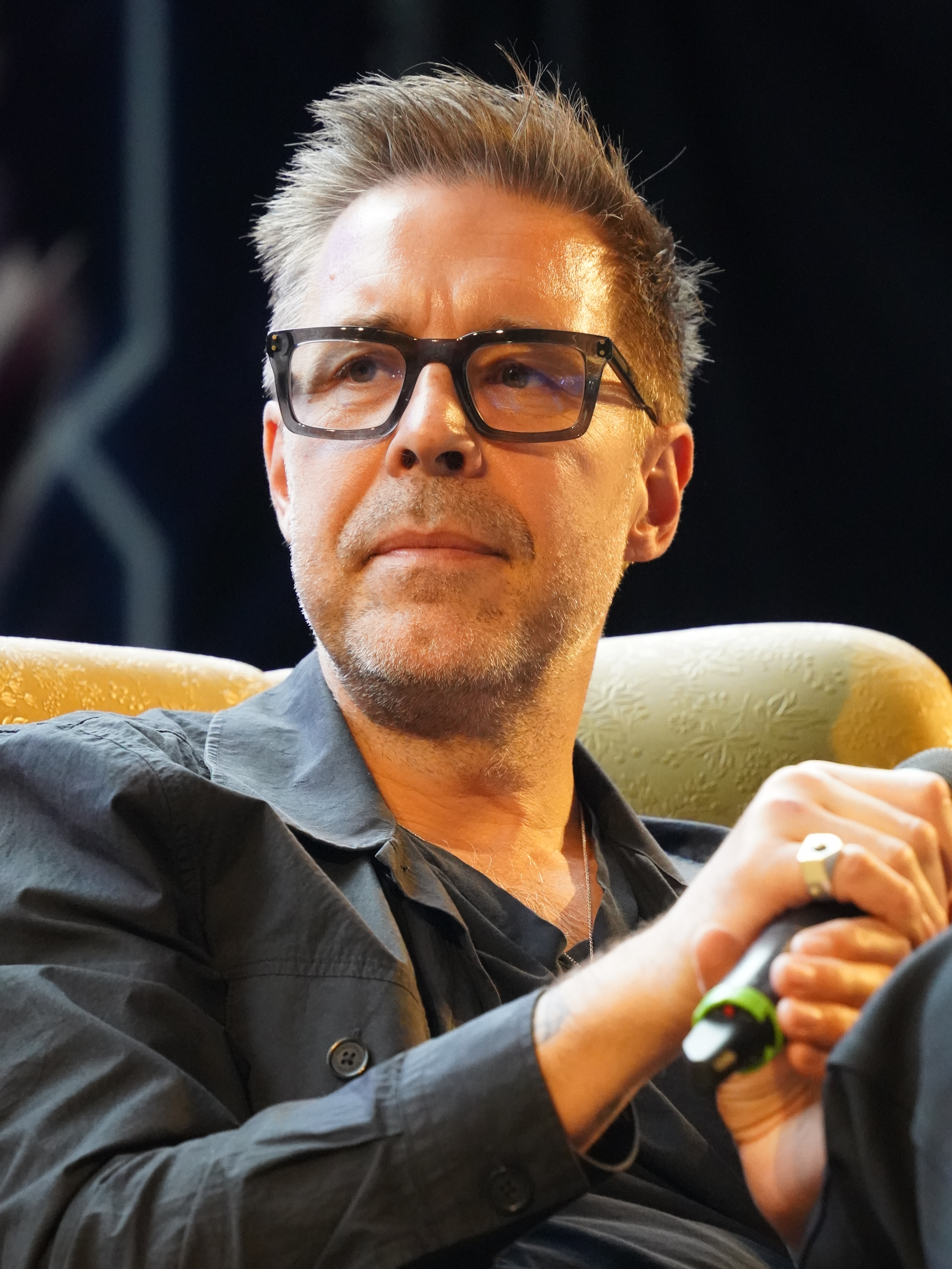
Paddy Considine

Paddy Considine was cast as Viserys in October 2020 for House of the Dragon, a prequel to Game of Thrones. In an interview with Winter is Coming, showrunner Ryan Condal explained that Considine was the first choice for the role of Viserys, praising him as an "incredibly gifted actor" who had experience in "everything from comedy to dark drama".

Considine was in "disbelief" upon finding out that he was being offered the role, as he believed that the entertainment industry had "at large had only ever seen him as the working-class striver he made his name playing in the 2000s". He was glad to take on the new role, as he thought himself "capable of so much more than what I was being given to play with", and felt that "he could finally showcase the full breadth of his talent."

Considine used the experience of witnessing his late father's declining health from cancer as an inspiration in portraying the physical decline of a frail Viserys in "The Lord of the Tides". He described his father as dealing with "gargling sounds, fighting for breath, and... being high on painkilling drugs and things like that", and added these elements to Viserys to "imbue him with sincerity and realness". He also explained that acting as a character who is sick caused oxygen levels in his body to decrease, as he was "nearly passing out from doing those things."

Considine was credited on the main cast for season 1, excluding the season finale "The Black Queen". In season 2, he made two uncredited guest appearances in the episodes "Smallfolk" and "The Red Sowing". Unlike several other prominent characters in House of the Dragon who were recast to address various time skips in season 1, Considine was not recast.

=== Season 1 ===
At the Great Council of 101 AC, King Jaehaerys I Targaryen's eldest male descendant Prince Viserys Targaryen is chosen to be the heir to the Iron Throne over his eldest descendant Princess Rhaenys Targaryen. In a time skip to the ninth year of Viserys' reign, his wife Queen Aemma Arryn is pregnant with a son, having experienced several previous miscarriages. At a great tournament celebrating the impending birth of Viserys' son, the Hand of the King Ser Otto Hightower warns Viserys against making his brutish younger brother Prince Daemon Targaryen his heir over his daughter Princess Rhaenyra Targaryen, but Viserys ignores Otto's advice. Viserys departs the tourney to be present as Aemma gives birth, but finds Aemma and the baby's lives to be at risk. He authorizes Grand Maester Mellos to perform a caesarian section in order to save the baby, completely aware that the procedure will kill Aemma. Aemma dies in agony giving birth to their son Baelon, who passes away a day later in infancy.

Otto has his daughter Lady Alicent Hightower console Viserys, and informs the small council that Daemon drunkingly referred to the deceased Baelon as "the heir for a day". An enraged Viserys confronts Daemon, who complains that he never had any support for him and insults Viserys as a weak king who is easily manipulated by Otto and his circle. He exiles Daemon to the Vale to consummate his marriage to Lady Rhea Royce, and removes Daemon's status as Viserys' heir with Rhaenyra. Preparing her to rule, Viserys informs Rhaenyra of their ancestor Aegon the Conqueror's dream of a supernatural threat from the north that can only be defeated if a Targaryen is on the Iron Throne, a secret prophecy known as the Song of Ice and Fire. Viserys officially declares Rhaenyra as his legal heir, and various lords across Westeros swear fealty to Rhaenyra.

Six months later, Viserys denies Master of Ships Lord Corlys Velaryon and Rhaenyra's requests to pursue military action against the Triarchy, hoping to avoid war with Essos. Corlys and his wife Rhaenys propose that Viserys marry their 12-year-old daughter Laena Velaryon, while Alicent continues to chat with Viserys in private. The small council is informed that Daemon has stolen a dragon egg and taken control of Dragonstone, leading to a confrontation between Otto and Daemon that is settled by Rhaenyra persuading Daemon to return the egg. Viserys is upset with Rhaenyra for disobeying his orders, and has a deeply personal conversation regarding the prospect of his remarriage. Ultimately, Viserys announces that he will take Alicent to be his next wife, which draws the wrath of Corlys and shocks Rhaenyra, who is best friends with Alicent.

Three years later, Viserys, Alicent, Rhaenyra, and various lords are celebrating the second birthday of his son, Prince Aegon Targaryen. The subject of marriage for Rhaenyra is a hot topic ; Viserys dismisses Lord Jason Lannister's marriage proposal, Otto proposes betrothing Rhaenyra to Aegon, and Master of Laws Lord Lyonel Strong proposes betrothing Rhaenyra with Corlys' son Ser Laenor Velaryon. After the hunt, Viserys assures Rhaenyra that he will not replace her as his heir, and encourages her to find a husband who can strengthen her claim to the throne. He also chooses to send aid to the Stepstones after roughly three years of refusing to support Daemon and Corlys's against the Triarchy.

Although infuriated by Viserys's sudden support, Daemon ultimately wins the Stepstones. He returns to court and swears his allegiance to Viserys by handing him his crown given to him in the Stepstones, stating that he knows that there is only one true king. Though the two celebrate their reunion at a feast, their relationship dissolves again when Viserys is informed by Otto that Daemon seduced Rhaenyra after taking her on a midnight escapade through the streets of King's Landing. This causes much inner turmoil for Viserys between dealing with Rhaenyra's indiscretion and Otto's spying upon her. In the throne room, a drunken Daemon confirms the affair and proposes marriage to Rhaenyra, influencing Viserys to accuse Daemon of wanting his crown and exile him once again. Viserys decides to terminate Rhaenyra's tour to find a husband of her choosing and betrothes her to Laenor to both avoid scandal and stabilize relations with House Velaryon. She accepts his command on the condition that he remove Otto as his Hand for spying on her and having greater personal ambitions, calling him a "vulture." Viserys sends Otto back to Oldtown and sends Rhaenyra a tea to prevent pregnancy from her affair, though he does not know that it was actually Ser Criston Cole who Rhaenyra slept with after Daemon made out with her but then left her in a brothel during their night out.

Viserys and Rhaenyra travel to Driftmark to propose the union of Rhaenyra and Laenor which Corlys and Rhaenys gladly accept. A feast is hosted to celebrate Rhaenyra and Laenor's nuptials, where Viserys' speech is interrupted by the entrance of Alicent, who boldly wears a green gown that represents a call to arms for House Hightower. The feast ends chaotically when Lord Commander of the Kingsguard Ser Criston Cole beats Laenor's male lover Ser Joffrey Lonmouth to death, after which the heartbroken Laenor and Rhaenyra marry in a private ceremony. Following this ceremony, Viserys collapses from frail health and is attended to by wedding guests.

Ten years later, Viserys and Alicent have three more children (Princess Helaena, Prince Aemond, and Prince Daeron Targaryen) while Rhaenyra and Laenor have also produced three children (Prince Jacaerys ("Jace"), Prince Lucerys ("Luke"), and Prince Joffrey Velaryon) around the same age. Alicent and her supporters at court, known as the "greens", spread rumors that Rhaenyra's children are bastards fathered by Ser Harwin Strong. Viserys strongly denies these claims, and rejects his new Hand Lyonel's offer to resign in disgrace, instead allowing him to return with his son Harwin to Harrenhal. Viserys gives Rhaenyra his approval to betrothe Jace to Helaena, which draws him scorn from Alicent.

Daemon and Laena have also been married in the years since the feast, and have twin daughters Baela and Rhaena Targaryen. Laena has her dragon Vhagar burn her after suffering through an unsuccessful labor, and a funeral is held for her in Driftmark where Viserys and Daemon reunite again. The dragonless Aemond claims Vhagar, which leads to a fight between Alicent and Rhaenyra's children where Luke slashes one of Aemond's eyes out. They are all brought before Viserys in a mass gathering, where a furious Alicent demands one of Luke's eyes to be taken out as retribution, arguing with Rhaenyra who defends her kids. After Viserys refuses to abide by Alicent's demand, she grabs his Valyrian steel dagger and rushes towards Luke, but is blocked by Rhaenyra. Aemond asserts that the loss of his eye in exchange for gaining a dragon was a fair trade, and Viserys considers the matter settled under those conditions. He also declares that anyone claiming Rhaenyra's children to be bastards will lose their tongue. Viserys reinstates Otto as his Hand (as Lyonel had recently perished in a fire), where he and Alicent conspire to solidify their family's positions at court while Rhaenyra and Daemon unite to counter their influence over the court.

Six years later, Viserys' health has greatly declined, as his face is partially disfigured and he is frequently bedridden. Otto and Alicent have de facto control over royal matters, as Viserys frequently drinks milk of the poppy and has declining mental acuity. Corlys' younger brother Vaemond petitions the crown to be named as Corlys' heir instead of Luke, who he accuses of being a bastard. Otto presides over the matter and is inclined to rule against Luke, but a frail Viserys shows up to the throne room to oversee the matter himself, walking to the Iron Throne with great difficulty and support from Daemon. After hearing arguments for and against Luke, Viserys decides to reaffirm Luke's status as heir to Driftmark, which enrages Vaemond. Vaemond calls Rhaenyra a "whore" and her children "bastards", which angers Viserys into declaring that he will have Vaemond's tongue for such speech, though Daemon decapitates Vaemond before he can do so.

Viserys hosts a feast among the two sides of his family, where he implores them to make amends for their past conflicts. Rhaenyra and Alicent compliment each other, and the family eats and laughs in harmony for the first time in years. Viserys is glad to see his family united, and departs for bed before Alicent and Rhaenyra's families become tense once again. As he lays in bed, Viserys mistakes Alicent for Rhaenyra and vocalizes Aegon the Conqueror's Song of Ice and Fire to her, with Alicent interpreting his words to mean that he wants her son Aegon to succeed him as king. He calls out to his "love" Aemma in his last words, and passes away shortly after on his bed.

=== Season 2 ===
While Daemon is in Harrenhal, he sees Viserys in a hallucination that resembles the argument they had before Viserys exiled him for the first time. Viserys appears before Daemon in another vision weeks later, where Viserys tells Daemon that he never truly wanted the crown, and that the responsibility of ruling of the realm crushes a king internally. He asks Daemon if he still wants the crown, influencing Daemon's later decision to swear fealty to Rhaenyra.

== Reception ==
George R.R. Martin praised Considine's performance as Viserys on his personal blog, as the actor "gives the character a tragic majesty that my book Viserys never quite achieved". In an interview with GQ, Considine recalled that Martin had sent him a text which read: "Your Viserys is better than my Viserys".

Critics have responded positively to Viserys' characterization, considering him to be one of the series’ most emotionally resonant characters. Ben Lindberg of The Ringer describes Viserys as the "most relatable" character in the show's ensemble, as his simple desires such as hosting tournaments and building a model of Valyria made him "much closer to the common man". Lindberg also emphasizes that Viserys was committed to his duty as king despite facing challenges, with his motivations being "love and responsibility" rather than "self-interest and thirst for personal power".

Academic commentary has examined audience reactions to Viserys through the lens of disability studies. Marty Heath, an assistant professor at Nazareth University, notes that the audience's reaction to Viserys' declining health evolves "from disgust and derision to laughter and eventually wonder and appreciation", reflecting "broader cultural attitudes toward disability". They compare the audience's early ridicule of Viserys' struggles to Daemon's own reactions, as the fierce Daemon attempts to distinguish himself from the "weak" Viserys due to his own abjection, while several audience members laughed at a scene in "We Light the Way" where Viserys struggles to cut his food as a result of losing his fingers. Heath notes that this "mutual distaste or disappointment evaporates" when a frail Viserys walks toward the Iron Throne in "The Lord of the Tides", as Daemon "shows care and even reverence to his brother" while the audience is touched by Viserys' heroic perseverance instead of joking about his condition.
