= The Rogue Prince =

2014 novelette by George R. R. Martin

The Rogue Prince, or, A King's Brother
- Author: George R. R. Martin
- Language: English
- Series: A Song of Ice and Fire
- Genre: Fantasy
- Published in: Rogues
- Publisher: Bantam Spectra
- Publication date: June 17, 2014
- Publication place: United States
- Preceded by: The Princess and the Queen
- Followed by: The Sons of the Dragon (prequel)

The Rogue Prince, or, a King's Brother is a fantasy novelette by American writer George R. R. Martin, published in the 2014 anthology Rogues. It is set on the continent of Westeros of Martin's A Song of Ice and Fire series, hundreds of years before the events of A Game of Thrones (1996) during the reign of King Viserys I Targaryen.

The Rogue Prince serves as a prequel to Martin's earlier 2013 novella The Princess and the Queen and focuses on the reign of Viserys I, from his grandfather Jaehaerys I Targaryen's death to his own. It chronicles the evolving complicated relationship between Viserys and his charismatic-yet-unruly younger brother Daemon, who is the titular antihero, and Viserys' plan for succession to his daughter from his first marriage even though he has a son from his second marriage, which cements a rivalry within the Targaryens that plays out in The Princess and the Queen.

The work is presented as the writing of the fictional Archmaester Gyldayn, also the "author" of Martin's The Princess and the Queen.

Elements of The Rogue Prince and The Princess and the Queen have been adapted into the HBO television series House of the Dragon.

== Plot ==
Near the end of King Jaehaerys I's long reign, a succession crisis emerges when his second son Baelon dies, leading to a Great Council to decide who should be the old king's heir. Jaehaerys's elder son Aemon also died some years before, leaving behind a daughter named Rhaenys — but there are many who prefer Baelon's 24-year-old son Viserys, due to his sex. Despite standard succession law that the elder brother's children should come first, Viserys wins the council by a ratio of twenty votes to one, and is declared the rightful heir. On the old king's death two years later, Viserys succeeds him on the Iron Throne. Rhaenys's husband is the powerful lord Corlys Velaryon, and this estranges the Velaryons from the royal court.

King Viserys, married to Aemma of House Arryn, names his daughter Rhaenyra as his successor, ahead of his hot-tempered and mercurial younger brother Daemon (the titular "rogue prince"). This decision contradicts the new inheritance law established at the Great Council, which should put a male heir ahead of any female one, but Daemon's reputation is so scandalous that Viserys's powerful advisor Otto Hightower eagerly goes along with it. Queen Aemma later dies in childbirth, to a son that lives only a day. Viserys later re-marries to Alicent Hightower, Otto's daughter, and they succeed in producing a male heir, Aegon; but Viserys never rescinds his choice of Rhaenyra to succeed him. The king and queen subsequently have a daughter (Helaena) and two more sons (Aemond and Daeron).

As the years pass, a rivalry develops between Rhaenyra and her stepmother Alicent — and two rival court factions develop around each of them. At a major tournament, Rhaenyra appears wearing a distinctive Targaryen-black dress, while Alicent wears one of the green dresses she favors. The two rival factions start copying this clothing style, with Rhaenyra's followers wearing black, and the Alicent/Aegon camp wearing green — leading to the two groups being dubbed "the Blacks and the Greens". Meanwhile, the Velaryons remain as a third major faction, but excluded from power at the royal court. Due to his adventures in the far east, Corlys Velaryon is still one of the wealthiest men in Westeros — and eventually, the isolated Daemon gravitates to the Velaryon camp as well, by marrying Corlys and Rhaenys's daughter Laena (producing two daughters, Baela and Rhaena).

Together, Daemon and Corlys launch a proxy war in the Stepstones island chain, raising an army of mercenaries to carve out territory from pirate enclaves — aided by the large Velaryon fleet, and Daemon's dragon Caraxes, who soon earns a reputation as "the Blood Wyrm", battle-hardened from all the blood he has spilled. Daemon is briefly crowned as the new king of the Stepstones (mostly ruling over pirates), but this makes other regional powers grow wary. After defeating Volantis to the east, the other southern Free Cities — Lys, Myr, and Tyrosh — set aside their differences to unite as a triple-alliance with a shared government, called "the Kingdom of the Three Daughters" of Valyria or "the Triarchy". The Triarchy at the eastern end of the island chain allies with independent Dorne at the western end of the Stepstones, and in subsequent years they apply more and more pressure on Daemon's mini-kingdom until he tires of the conflict and withdraws to King's Landing.

Meanwhile, the willful young Rhaenyra is infatuated with Ser Criston Cole of the kingsguard, but through unclear circumstances is later rumored to be in a relationship with Ser Harwin Strong. Pressured by her father, Rhaenyra eventually submits to an arranged marriage with her cousin Laenor Velaryon (son of Corlys, brother of Laena). Their marriage is unhappy, as Laenor is known to prefer the company of men. Rhaenyra gives birth to three sons (Jacaerys, Lucerys and Joffrey), but none of them have the classic Targaryen features of silver-blonde hair and purple eyes — and a "coincidental" resemblance to Harwin Strong — which, combined with widespread rumors of Laenor's sexuality, leads the Greens to whisper persistent rumors that they are really bastards fathered by Harwin Strong.

Animosity between Rhaenyra and Alicent also puts their children at odds with one another. In rapid succession, Laena dies after a stillbirth and then Laenor dies in a suspicious quarrel. At Laena's funeral, Rhaenyra's sons brawl with Alicent's son Aemond when he tries to claim Laena's dragon Vhagar: as the older Aemond begins to overpower them, Lucerys pulls out a knife, ending up in Aemond losing one eye, but succeeding in claiming Vhagar, the greatest living dragon.

Not long after, the realm is shocked to learn that Rhaenyra and her uncle Daemon remarried to each other, without asking Viserys's leave. This unites the estranged Velaryons with Rhaenyra's faction of Blacks, and they become one of her biggest supporters against the Greens. They have two sons — another Aegon and Viserys. Alicent's son Aegon also marries his sister Helaena. They produce twins, Jaehaerys and Jaehaera, and a third child named Maelor. The Hightowers, meanwhile, remain the biggest supporters of Alicent's Aegon, and her father Otto becomes Hand of the King for many years. The Hightowers increasingly whisper that according to the Great Council at the death of Jaehaerys I, a male heir should come ahead of a female one, and thus Aegon should inherit the throne ahead of Rhaenyra — even though Otto himself once ignored that precedent of the council, when he wanted young Rhaenyra to be heir ahead of her uncle Daemon (a hypocrisy not lost on the Blacks). Rhaenyra's followers also counter that had the Great Council followed standard inheritance, Aemon’s daughter Rhaenys should still have inherited ahead of Baelon's son Viserys, in which case Rhaenyra's sons with Laenor would rank ahead of Aegon anyway (which only encourages the Greens to double-down on the accusation that they are really bastards).

The subsequent death of King Viserys — in his bed, from old age and poor health — sets the stage for The Princess and the Queen, and the outbreak of the Dance of the Dragons.

== Development ==
The story was to be included in the companion book The World of Ice & Fire but was removed because the book was becoming too long for the original concept of a fully illustrated book. It and several other stories appeared in abridged versions in other anthologies.

== See also ==
- The Princess and the Queen
- Fire & Blood, the expanded "history" novel incorporating plots of both The Princess and the Queen and The Rogue Prince
  - House of the Dragon, the HBO television series based on Fire & Blood
