= Rhaenyra Targaryen =

Fictional character

- A Song of Ice and Fire character House of the Dragon character
- Emma D'Arcy as Rhaenyra Targaryen during the first season of House of the Dragon
- First appearance: Literature: The Princess and the Queen (2013); Television: "The Heirs of the Dragon" (2022)
- Created by: George R. R. Martin
- Based on: Empress Matilda
- Adapted by: Ryan Condal and George R. R. Martin (for House of the Dragon)
- Portrayed by: Emma D'Arcy (adult); Milly Alcock (teen)

In-universe information
- Aliases: The Realm's Delight; The Black Queen; The Dragon Queen
- Gender: Female
- Titles: Princess of Dragonstone; Queen of the Andals, the Rhoynar, and the First Men (claimant); Lady of the Seven Kingdoms (claimant); Protector of the Realm (claimant) (Note: Only within the canon of the House of the Dragon television series.)
- Affiliation: The Blacks
- Family: House Targaryen; House Velaryon (by marriage)
- Spouses: Laenor Velaryon; Daemon Targaryen (uncle)
- Significant others: Criston Cole; Harwin Strong; Mysaria
- Children: with Harwin Strong (legally Laenor Velaryon): Jacaerys Velaryon; Lucerys Velaryon; Joffrey Velaryon; with Daemon Targaryen: Aegon III Targaryen; Viserys II Targaryen; Visenya Targaryen (stillborn)
- Relatives: Viserys I Targaryen (father); Aemma Arryn (mother); Baelon Targaryen (brother); Aegon II Targaryen (half-brother); Helaena Targaryen (half-sister); Aemond Targaryen (half-brother); Daeron Targaryen (half-brother)

Rhaenyra Targaryen is a fictional character in the A Song of Ice and Fire series of epic fantasy by American author George R. R. Martin, appearing in the 2013 novella The Princess and the Queen and the 2014 novella The Rogue Prince. Her story was later expanded and revised in 2018 book Fire & Blood, styled to be fictional chronicle of Westeros. She has been called "the face" of the television adaptation House of the Dragon, and is portrayed by Australian actress Milly Alcock as a teenager and primarily by English actor Emma D'Arcy as an adult. The character and D'Arcy's performance in particular have been met with critical acclaim.

Through a series of circumstances, Rhaenyra is unprecedentedly named heir to the Iron Throne by her father, King Viserys I Targaryen. Her claim was challenged by her half-brother Aegon II Targaryen and ultimately usurped, leading to a war of succession for control of the Iron Throne, known as the Dance of the Dragons.

== Character background ==
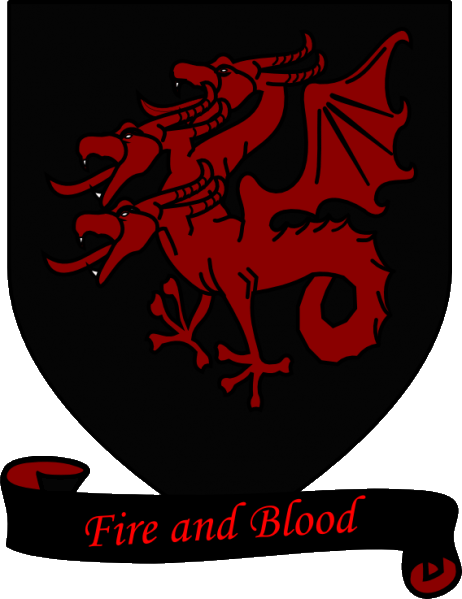
Coat of arms of House Targaryen

=== The Princess and the Queen / Fire & Blood ===
Born 97 years after Aegon's Conquest, Rhaenyra was the only living child of King Viserys I Targaryen and his first wife, Queen Aemma Arryn, after the deaths of her infant brothers. She was known as the youngest dragonrider, claiming Syrax when she was seven years old and developed a close relationship with her father. Rhaenyra was also enamored by her uncle, Daemon Targaryen, a rebellious figure known as the Rogue Prince. At one point, Rhaenyra was hailed as the 'Realm's Delight' due to her physical beauty.

Following the death of her mother and brother Baelon during childbirth, Viserys is left without a son, and names Rhaenyra as his heir to the Iron Throne and the Seven Kingdoms and the Princess of Dragonstone. She is wed to the son of Corlys Velaryon and Rhaenys Targaryen, Laenor Velaryon; however, it is a marriage of convenience to strengthen the ties between the two Houses as Laenor is homosexual and Rhaenyra is romantically interested in the Kingsguard member Criston Cole. She later has an affair with the knight Harwin Strong with whom she has three bastard sons, Jacaerys, Lucerys, and Joffrey, all of whom were claimed as legitimate sons of Laenor.

After Laenor's death, Rhaenyra wed her uncle Daemon and had two sons, Aegon and Viserys, and a stillborn daughter named Visenya. Rhaenyra vowed for her son Lucerys' claim to the Velaryon seat of Driftmark; however she was rebuffed by councilmen and Velaryon kinsmen alike on the validity of his claim due to suspicion that he was the bastard son of Harwin Strong. Viserys has the tongues of the men cut out.

After the death of Viserys I, the Dowager Queen Alicent Hightower takes part in a coup to overthrow Rhaenyra's claim to the Iron Throne, deeming her unfit to rule and arguing she should come after her sons in the line of succession due to her sex, and instead have her son Aegon II Targaryen crowned instead. This leads to a war of succession and civil war known as the Dance of the Dragons. Rhaenyra is crowned as queen by her supporters, known as the 'Blacks', on the island of Dragonstone, while Aegon II is formally crowned as the ruler of the Seven Kingdoms in King's Landing.

Soon thereafter, Rhaenyra's son Lucerys Velaryon with his dragon Arrax, and her half-brother Aemond Targaryen with his much larger dragon Vhagar, both fly to Storm's End to seek allegiance from Lord Borros Baratheon. A fight between the two ensues in the skies of Shipbreaker Bay, resulting in the death of Lucerys and his dragon. This enrages Rhaenyra and as revenge, Daemon hires the assassins Blood and Cheese to kill Aegon II's eldest son and heir apparent Jaehaerys in a "son for a son" ploy. This leads to both parties halting any chances of resolution and engaging in open warfare with Alicent's faction known as the 'Greens', the color of House Hightower.

After some early Green victories during which she loses her oldest son and heir Jacaerys, Rhaenyra successfully takes over the capital of King's Landing, expelling Aegon II, but her reign is short-lived. Her half-year rule sees her imposing harsh taxes, due to the treasury being secretly emptied by the Green's supporters, as well as her growing paranoia after the death of her husband Daemon, and summary executions of perceived traitors, triggering a violent riot in the capital. Mobs of starved and frustrated capital citizens storm the dragonpit, killing most of the Blacks' dragons alongside her son Joffrey, forcing her to escape back to Dragonstone. On her way to Dragonstone, Rhaenyra is betrayed and brought before Aegon II, who has her killed by having his dragon Sunfyre burn her alive and eat her in six bites in front of Aegon the Younger.

The war continues after Rhaenyra's death, with her Black supporters rallying behind her fourth son, Aegon the Younger, despite the latter being imprisoned as a hostage by Aegon II. Following Aegon II's death by poisoning, he is later freed and crowned as King Aegon III Targaryen, ending the conflict. However, the Black's victory is overshadowed by the fact that all but four dragons were killed during the war, eventually leading to their extinction two decades later.

House Targaryen, continuing through Rhaenyra's direct family line, reigns for the next 150 years, until it is overthrown by Robert Baratheon, leading to the events in A Game of Thrones.

=== Real-life inspiration ===
George R. R. Martin found inspiration for Rhaenyra's story from Empress Matilda (Maud) of Norman England. Like her fictional counterpart, Matilda, daughter and only surviving child of Henry I, was sworn in as the heir to the throne of England by her own father. However, the Anglo-Norman nobility at the time wasn't willing to accept a female monarch, especially since Matilda was considered too German in cultural habits (due to her earlier marriage to Henry V, Holy Roman Emperor). This led to her cousin, Stephen of Blois, usurping the throne after Henry I's death. Matilda, who was away in Normandy married to Geoffrey Plantagenet, Count of Anjou, responded militarily to Stephen's crowning, triggering a 15-years-long war of succession known as The Anarchy, which eventually ended with the ascension of Matilda's son Henry II. Both the fictional Dance of the Dragons and the real-life Anarchy are civil wars fought between two factions claiming their legitimate right to the throne, with both campaigns starting and ending in similar manners.

== Television adaptation ==
=== Casting and development ===
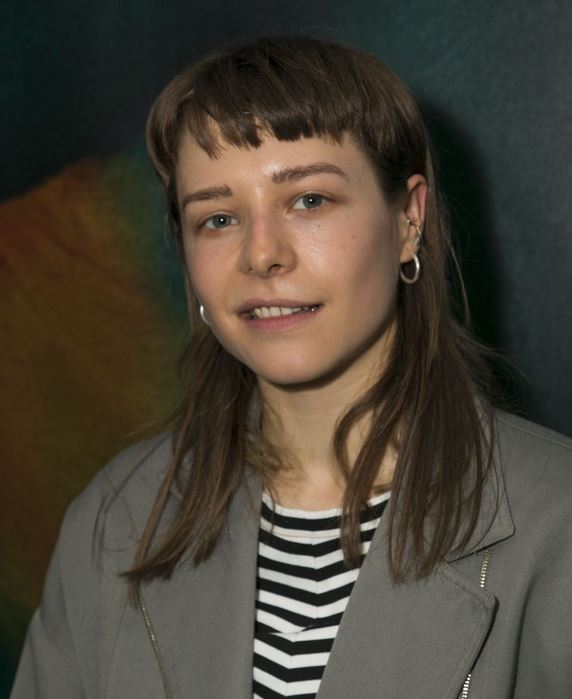
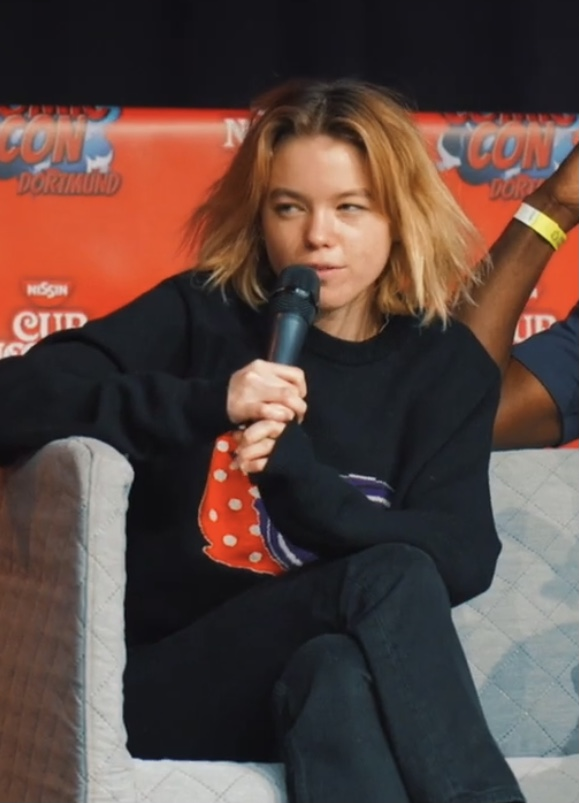
Emma D'Arcy and Milly Alcock play the role of older and younger Rhaenyra Targaryen in the television series

Emma D'Arcy was cast as Rhaenyra in December 2020, while Milly Alcock was cast in July 2021. Both actors had to learn High Valyrian for their roles, with D'Arcy reportedly enjoying the experience.

Rhaenyra Targaryen's backstory is mostly preserved from page to screen; however, in the adaptation, she is close friends with Alicent Hightower while the latter is just daughter of Hand of the King, Ser Otto Hightower. Co-creator and executive producer Ryan Condal in an interview with Entertainment Weekly revealed D'Arcy's Rhaenyra to be, "the most important role in the show, in many ways." With director Miguel Sapochnik proclaiming D'Arcy, "the face of the show."

Avid fans noted that details of Rhaenyra's vicious demise were revealed to viewers early on in the previous Game of Thrones series in the third-season episode "And Now His Watch Is Ended", where Joffrey Baratheon reveals to Margaery Tyrell while viewing the graves of past Targaryens, that Rhaenyra was eaten by her half-brother Aegon II’s dragon while her son watched.

=== Season 1 ===
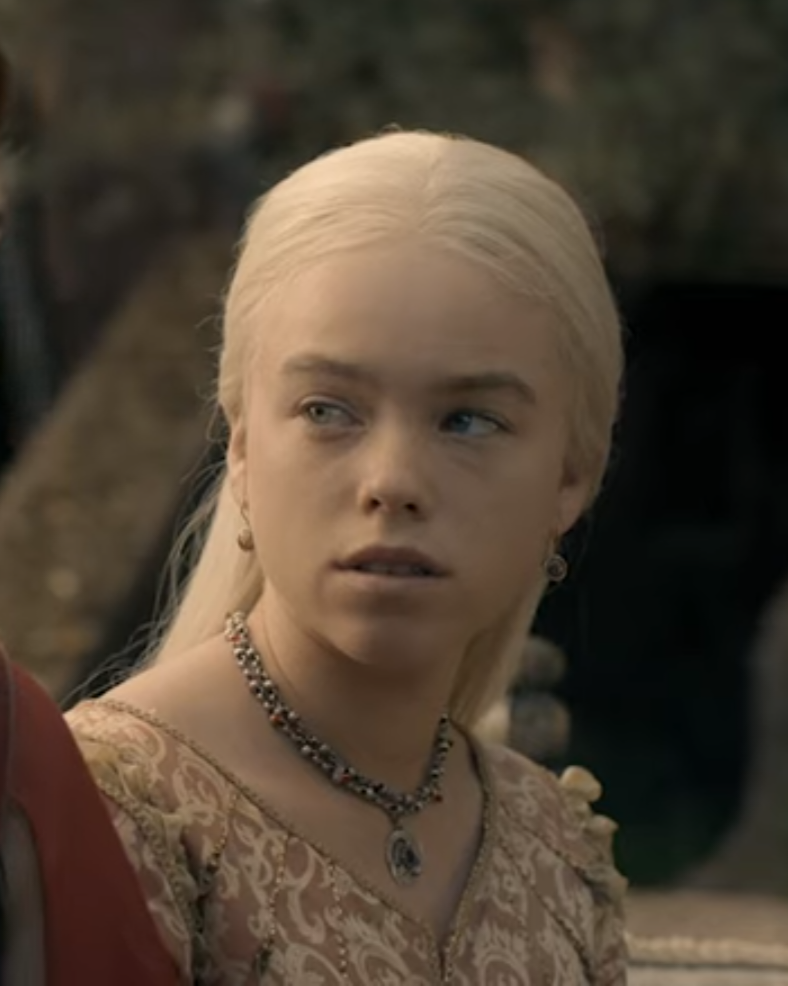
Milly Alcock as Rhaenyra Targaryen during the first season of House of the Dragon

Following the deaths of her mother and brother during childbirth, as well as her uncle Prince Daemon Targaryen's comments about the late 'heir for a day', Rhaenyra is named heir to the Iron Throne by her father, King Viserys I Targaryen. As the first woman to be named heir, Rhaenyra is forced to fight off challenges to her succession. One of these challenges comes from the Hand of the King, Otto Hightower, who wants his grandson, and Rhaenyra's half-brother, Prince Aegon to be king. After Rhaenyra spends a night with Daemon on the Street of Silk, Otto reports it to the king. Viserys removes Otto from his position and arranges Rhaenyra's marriage to Laenor Velaryon. This drives a wedge between her and her childhood friend, Queen Alicent Hightower, Otto's daughter and Viserys' second wife.

As Laenor is homosexual, Rhaenyra has three bastard sons with the Lord Commander of the City Watch, Harwin Strong, Jacaerys (nicknamed Jace), Lucerys, and Joffrey. Rumors of her sons' illegitimacy due to their lack of resemblance to Laenor swirl in the Red Keep, forcing her to leave the capital and reside on Dragonstone. Afterward, she and Daemon conspire to fake Laenor's death so that they can marry and Laenor can leave Westeros with his lover, Qarl Correy. Six years later, Rhaenyra and Daemon have had two children, Aegon and Viserys, and Rhaenyra is pregnant with a third. When Viserys passes away, the Small Council usurps the Iron Throne and installs Aegon II as king. The shock triggers a premature birth in which the child is lost. Though initially seeking a peaceful resolution to the conflict, the death of Lucerys by his uncle Aemond leads to a war of succession, as Rhaenyra is crowned queen by her faction – the Blacks.

=== Season 2 ===
Rhaenyra confirms Lucerys' death at Shipbreaker Bay by finding his dragon's washed-up remains and vows revenge on Aemond. After Daemon's orders to two assassins to have Aemond killed results in Aegon's heir Jaehaerys being killed instead, Rhaenyra's popularity in King's Landing suffers and she in turn loses her trust in him. After Criston Cole orders Arryk Cargyll to kill Rhaenyra by disguising himself as his twin Erryk, Mysaria alerts the queensguard which results in the death of both brothers as the latter tries to fend off the former. Rhaenyra then appoints Mysaria as her advisor, sends her step-daughter Rhaena Targaryen to The Vale with dragon eggs and her youngest three sons to protect them, and tries to unsuccessfully reason with Alicent by sneaking into King's Landing. She also realizes Alicent confused her son Aegon with Aegon the Conqueror's dream during Viserys' last words about the Prince who was Promised.

After the battle at Rook's Rest results in Rhaenys' death alongside her dragon Meleys, the Blacks collectively mourn her death. Rhaenyra then laments about how Vermithor and Silverwing lack riders, two dragons who are large enough to face the Greens' Vhagar, after which her son Jace suggests searching other noble houses for Targaryen descendants. She then approaches her queensguard Steffon Darklyn due to his distant Targaryen ancestor, but his attempt at claiming Seasmoke results in him being incinerated. Distraught, Rhaenyra confides in Mysaria, who had previously convinced her to send boats of food to the starving people of King's Landing to garner support, and the two share a kiss.

Later, Rhaenyra finds out that Seasmoke has been spotted with a rider which results in her pursuing them, Addam of Hull, unknown to her that he is Corlys Velaryon's bastard. He pledges his loyalty to her, and this prompts Mysaria to advise her to look for dragonseeds (bastards with Valyrian blood) among the smallfolk rather than distant relatives among the few houses loyal to her. After the Red Sowing which results in many deaths, the blacksmith Hugh Hammer claims Vermithor and the drunkard Ulf White claims Silverwing. Aemond pursues Silverwing to Dragonstone upon seeing him above King's Landing, but retreats after seeing Rhaenyra with three dragons, all of them now with riders. Rhaenyra rides to Harrenhal after Simon Strong sends a warning about Daemon being possibly traitorous. After a vision shows Daemon future events involving the Song of Ice and Fire, he bends the knee to Rhaenyra and pledges fealty. After Alicent attempts to negotiate with Rhaenyra by sneaking to Dragonstone, the latter explains the only way to peace would be for her to have Aegon's head.

=== Season 3 ===
During the Battle of the Gullet, Rhaenyra is confined by her son and heir Jacaerys Velaryon for her protection. Jace is killed during the battle along with his dragon Vermax, devastating Rhaenyra. Rhaenyra leads Daemon, Hugh and Ulf on their dragons to King's Landing, quickly taking the Iron Throne with help from the City Watch, who are still loyal to Daemon. Rhaenyra then executes an imprisoned Otto Hightower, and finally claims the Iron Throne.

== Reception ==
Rhaenyra is considered by many to be one of House of the Dragon's most popular characters and the series' most central figure. She was included on IMDb's list of favourite new characters of 2022, and was named the show's best character by Men's Journal, with writer Griff Griffin noting, "Rhaenyra is a deeply complex, infinitely flawed, but never-less-than captivating character." In an article discussing the show's decision to depict so much of her life, Comic Book Resources called Rhaenyra, "the single most important character in the dance." Highlighting the necessity of showing the relationships she had with various characters at different stages of her life. Despite her status as a controversial historical figure in George R. R. Martin's world, Rhaenyra has been praised for being bold, defiant and ahead of her time. ComicBook.com called her "layered", "richly human", and "fierce" and In 2022 named her the best female TV character of the year with writer Nicole Drum stating, "over the course of the season, fans saw Rhaenrya deal with love, betrayal, intrigue, politics, heartbreak, and loss and it's a range of experiences that D'Arcy brought to life with sometimes gut-wrenching authenticity."

Both actors garnered acclaim for their portrayal of Rhaenyra, with Alcock receiving a nomination for a Critics' Choice Television Award and D'Arcy receiving two Golden Globe Award nominations. Writing for The A.V. Club Jenna Scherer highlighted Alcock's work in the first season noting, "Alcock convincingly portrays her character's evolution as she tests the limits of her power, both as a woman and a ruler." While lauding D'Arcy's introduction, senior Collider contributor Jessie Nguyen wrote that Rhaenyra's childbirth scene in episode six, "serves as a fast demonstration of D'Arcy's talent. From birth until the walk, the entire sequence was a single take, however, D'Arcy never wavered or broke character while still convincingly portraying Rhaenyra's misery and proving to be a tough opponent in the game." Additionally, Marcus Jones of IndieWire praised D'Arcy's take on Rhaenyra proclaiming: "Though House of the Dragon is an ensemble series, viewers can tell just by D'Arcy's presence that their Rhaenyra is the star of the show."

In October 2022, Google created an Easter Egg animation of a Negroni Sbagliato after D'Arcy referred to it as their favourite drink in a viral interview with Olivia Cooke for HBO Max.

D'Arcy's work in the second season gained even wider critical acclaim, with critics including it among the best performances of the franchise. Kaiya Shunyata of RogerEbert.com opined, "Emma D'Arcy is a force to be reckoned with when they are on screen. The actor portrays sorrow so intensely it's hard to look at them, yet you cannot take your eyes away. As their face scrunches up to try and hold tears at bay, I couldn't help but think that this is perhaps the best performance in anything related to A Song of Ice and Fire since the early seasons of Game of Thrones." The episode "The Red Sowing" was specifically singled out, with James Hunt of ScreenRant and Kayleigh Dray of The A.V. Club labelling D'Arcy's performance, "brilliant." Den of Geek's Alex Bojalad proclaimed, "D'Arcy remains one of the show's most elite performers." Proma Khosla of IndieWire lauded D'Arcy's performance stating, "D'Arcy does some excellent acting with their eyes alone as Daemon approaches Rhaenyra in the great hall; it has flashes of Rhaenyra as a teenager, both intimidated by and attracted to this man, and she visibly stamps down the urge to impress him. Create a new category and give them the dang Emmy!"

Therese Lacson of Collider criticized the character's apprehension and hesitancy to go to war in the second season stating, "One of the most difficult characters to write is actually the protagonist at the center of the story. Rhaenyra is the beating heart of House of the Dragon, and we return to the series to find her completely broken-hearted. Season 2 does a lot to remind us that she's mourning while also being dragged into a civil war, but it can also be frustrating to watch as opportunities for her to gain the upper hand go by." In another article for Collider, Lacson, analysing the character's arc noted, "She waffles on her decisions in much of Season 2, which makes it feel like her character stagnates in the season, but by the end of the season, when she embraces some of her old fire, and we see her gain the dragonseed riders, it feels like we're getting a whole new, more dangerous side to the character."

The TV adaptation turned Rhaenyra's passive role in the books to a more active one in the show.
