= The Princess and the Queen =

2013 fantasy novella by George R. R. Martin

The Princess and the Queen, or, The Blacks and the Greens
- Author: George R. R. Martin
- Audio read by: Iain Glen
- Language: English
- Series: A Song of Ice and Fire
- Genre: Fantasy
- Published in: Dangerous Women
- Publisher: Tor Books
- Publication date: December 3, 2013
- Publication place: United States
- Media type: Novella
- Followed by: The Rogue Prince (prequel)

The Princess and the Queen, or, the Blacks and the Greens is an epic fantasy novella by American novelist George R. R. Martin, published in the 2013 Tor Books anthology Dangerous Women. The novella is presented in the form of writings by the fictional historian Archmaester Gyldayn, who is also the "author" of Martin's 2014 novella The Rogue Prince, a direct prequel to The Princess and the Queen. The plot of both The Rogue Prince and The Princess and the Queen is later expanded further in the 2018 novel Fire & Blood, which also spawned a television series in 2022.

A spin-off of Martin's A Song of Ice and Fire novel series, The Princess and the Queen is set about 200 years before the events of A Game of Thrones (1996) and chronicles the "continent-burning warfare" of a Targaryen war of succession that explodes between heir to the throne Crown Princess Rhaenyra Targaryen (whose supporters are known as "the blacks") and her stepmother Queen Alicent Hightower (supported by "the greens"), who conspired to usurp Rhaenyra and have her half-brother Aegon II (Alicent's eldest son) crowned on the Iron Throne instead. The resulting civil war is called the "Dance of the Dragons" due to the active involvement of dragonriders and is designated the primary cause for the extinction of dragons in Westeros before the time of A Song of Ice and Fire.

== Plot ==
When King Viserys I Targaryen dies, his second wife and widow, Queen Alicent of House Hightower, conspires a coup and has their eldest son Prince Aegon crowned as King Aegon II, before Viserys' daughter and only surviving child from his first marriage, Crown Princess Rhaenyra, can inherit the Iron Throne herself. Although Rhaenyra is the king's oldest child and had been named heir apparent 24 years earlier, Queen Alicent and her supporters declare Rhaenyra unfit to rule and argue that, as a woman, Rhaenyra should be placed after Alicent's male children in the line of succession.

After Rhaenyra is crowned Queen by her followers at the Targaryen ancestral seat of Dragonstone, her second-born son Lucerys Velaryon and King Aegon's younger brother Aemond both take their dragons to seek the support of Lord Borros Baratheon of Storm's End. Lucerys and his dragon Arrax are attacked and killed over Shipbreaker Bay by Aemond, who rides the much larger dragon Vhagar. In revenge, Rhaenyra's uncle and second husband, Prince Daemon, has Aegon II's elder son and heir Jaehaerys murdered by a pair of assassins. Soon, both branches of the Targaryen royal line are at open war, rallying various noble houses supporting Rhaenyra (known as "The Blacks", a color she often wore) against those supporting Aegon II and Queen Alicent (known as "The Greens", a color she often wore).

The war of succession – known as the "Dance of the Dragons" due to both sides having dragonriders – is the first major civil war of the Targaryen dynasty and sees many Targaryen relatives, dragons, and noblemen killed in combat, including Rhaenyra's eldest son, Jacaerys Velaryon. After some early Greens victories, Rhaenyra successfully turns the tide and assaults the capital, King's Landing, expelling Aegon II and capturing large numbers of Green members. However, the harsh taxes she then enacts (due to the treasury being secretly emptied by the Greens supporters), as well as her vengeful lust, paranoia and subsequent summary executions of perceived traitors, trigger a violent riot in the capital, during which angry mobs fearful of dragons storm the Dragonpit and kill most of the remaining dragons (as well as Joffrey Velaryon, her last surviving son from her first marriage to Laenor Velaryon), and she is forced to flee after just half a year on the throne. Eventually, Aegon II's two brothers, Aemond and Daeron, as well as his only remaining son, Maelor, are all killed. Aegon himself is rendered crippled and no longer fertile; likewise, by the end of the war, Rhaenyra's three eldest children have all been killed along with her husband, Prince Daemon. Rhaenyra is betrayed and captured by Aegon II, who brutally executes her by having his crippled dragon Sunfyre burn her alive before devouring her in six bites. The war continues after Rhaenyra's death, with her Blacks supporters rallying behind her fourth son, Aegon the Younger, despite the latter being imprisoned as a hostage by Aegon II.

As the last known living male member of House Targaryen, Aegon the Younger is named by Aegon II as his heir, but is constantly threatened with execution by his uncle. However, after the Greens' last army is annihilated at the Battle of the Kingsroad, the stubbornly defiant Aegon II is assassinated by his own men, who then surrender unconditionally to the Blacks. Aegon the Younger is freed and crowned as King Aegon III, ending the conflict. It is a pyrrhic victory, as House Targaryen has lost virtually all of their dragons. The surviving dragons either go feral and/or die out during the reign of Aegon III, earning him the infamous nickname "Dragonbane".

House Targaryen, continuing through Rhaenyra's direct family line, reigns for the next 150 years, until it is overthrown by Robert Baratheon.

== Development ==
According to George R. R. Martin, the Dance of the Dragons, the main conflict portrayed in The Princess and the Queen, was inspired by the 15-year-long civil war in High Medieval England known as the Anarchy, where Empress Matilda, the daughter and heir of Henry I of England, fought a protracted war of succession against her cousin Stephen from 1138 to 1153 AD, which eventually ended with the ascension of Matilda's son Henry II, the founder of the Plantagenet dynasty.

The story was to be included in the companion book The World of Ice & Fire but was removed because the book was becoming too long for the original concept of a fully illustrated book. It and several other stories appeared in abridged versions in other anthologies.

== Reception ==
Entertainment Weekly called the 35,000-word novella "a great demonstration of Martin's ability to dramatize the slippery complexities of power: how evil begets heroism, how heroes become villains". The Princess and the Queen was nominated for a 2014 Locus Award.

== Adaptation ==
An HBO series adaptation of The Princess and the Queen, called House of the Dragon, began airing from August 21, 2022. House of the Dragon is a prequel to Game of Thrones covering the Dance of Dragons civil war and incorporates additional material from Fire and Blood and the expanded text "The Dying of Dragons." The show is produced by Martin, Vince Gerardis, Ryan Condal, and Miguel Sapochnik; in addition, the latter two are its showrunners. The sixth episode of the pilot season of House of the Dragon is also named after the novella.

== See also ==
- "The Rogue Prince" (2014), the prequel to The Princess and the Queen
- Fire & Blood (2018), the expanded novel incorporating the story of The Princess and the Queen
