= Outline of A Song of Ice and Fire =

Overview of and topical guide to A Song of Ice and Fire

The following outline is provided as an overview of and topical guide to George R. R. Martin's A Song of Ice and Fire:

A Song of Ice and Fire – series of epic fantasy novels by the American novelist and screenwriter George R. R. Martin. A Song of Ice and Fire takes place on the fictional continents Westeros and Essos. The point of view of each chapter in the story is a limited perspective of a range of characters growing from nine, in the first novel, to thirty-one by the fifth. The works and their setting have inspired a large media franchise. Among the many derived works are several prequel novellas, a TV series, a comic book adaptation, and several card, board, and video games.

== What type of thing is A Song of Ice and Fire? ==
A Song of Ice and Fire is an example of all of the following:

- Fiction – form of narrative which deals, in part or in whole, with events that are not factual, but rather, imaginary and invented by its author(s). Although fiction often describes a major branch of literary work, it is also applied to theatrical, cinematic, and musical work.
  - A series of novels – set or series of novels which share common themes, characters, or settings, but where each novel has its own title and free-standing storyline, and can thus be read independently or out of sequence. Novels are a form of fiction.
  - Fantasy fiction – fiction genre that uses magic or other supernatural elements as a main plot element, theme, or setting.
    - High fantasy fiction – subgenre of fantasy, defined either by its setting in an imaginary world or by the epic stature of its characters, themes, and plot.
    - a fantasy world – fictional setting comprising an entire planet, used in fantasy fiction, for example in novels and games. Typical worlds involve magic or magical abilities and often, but not always, either a medieval or futuristic theme. Some worlds may be an entirely independent world set in another universe. See World of A Song of Ice and Fire.
  - a fictional setting – place that exists only in fiction and not in reality. Writers may create and describe such places to serve as the backdrop for their fictional works.
    - a fictional universe –
      - a constructed world – Developing an imaginary setting with coherent qualities such as a history, geography, and ecology is a key task for many science fiction and fantasy writers. Worldbuilding often involves the creation of maps, a backstory, and people for the world. Constructed worlds can enrich the backstory and history of fictional works, and can be created for personal amusement or for specific creative endeavors such as novels, video games, or role-playing games.
- Intellectual property – creations of the mind, protected by copyright. Intangible assets, such as musical, literary, and artistic works. The first volume of the series, A Game of Thrones, was published (and copyrighted) in 1996.
  - a media franchise – collection of media whereby intellectual property (IP) is licensed from an original work of media (usually a work of fiction), such as a film, a work of literature, a television program or a video game, to other parties or partners for commercial exploitation. A property can be exploited across a range of mediums and by a variety of industries for merchandising purposes. A Song of Ice and Fire has been marketed in the form of books, a television series, a comic book, games, etc. See franchises originating in literary works.

== Published literature ==
=== Original works ===
- Novels
  - A Game of Thrones (1996)
  - A Clash of Kings (1998)
  - A Storm of Swords (2000)
  - A Feast for Crows (2005)
  - A Dance with Dragons (2011)
  - The Winds of Winter (TBA)
  - A Dream of Spring (TBA)
- Prequels
  - Tales of Dunk and Egg (1998–2015) / A Knight of the Seven Kingdoms (2015)
    - The Hedge Knight (1998)
    - The Sworn Sword (2003)
    - The Mystery Knight (2010)
  - Fire & Blood (2018)
    - The Princess and the Queen (2013)
    - The Rogue Prince (2014)
    - The Sons of the Dragon (2017)
- Companion books
  - The World of Ice & Fire (2014)
  - The Rise of the Dragon (2022)

== Franchise ==
=== Game of Thrones television series ===
- Game of Thrones episodes
  - Game of Thrones Season 1
    - "Winter Is Coming" winter is coming
    - "The Kingsroad"
    - "Lord Snow"
    - "Cripples, Bastards, and Broken Things"
    - "The Wolf and the Lion"
    - "A Golden Crown"
    - "You Win or You Die"
    - "The Pointy End"
    - "Baelor"
    - "Fire and Blood"
  - Game of Thrones Season 2
    - "The North Remembers"
    - "The Night Lands"
    - "What Is Dead May Never Die"
    - "Garden of Bones"
    - "The Ghost of Harrenhal"
    - "The Old Gods and the New"
    - "A Man Without Honor"
    - "The Prince of Winterfell"
    - "Blackwater"
    - "Valar Morghulis"
  - Game of Thrones Season 3
    - "Valar Dohaeris"
    - "Dark Wings, Dark Words"
    - "Walk of Punishment"
    - "And Now His Watch Is Ended"
    - "Kissed by Fire"
    - "The Climb"
    - "The Bear and the Maiden Fair"
    - "Second Sons"
    - "The Rains of Castamere"
    - "Mhysa"
  - Game of Thrones Season 4
    - "Two Swords"
    - "The Lion and the Rose"
    - "Breaker of Chains"
    - "Oathkeeper"
    - "First of His Name"
    - "The Laws of Gods and Men"
    - "Mockingbird"
    - "The Mountain and the Viper"
    - "The Watchers on the Wall"
    - "The Children"
  - Game of Thrones Season 5
    - "The Wars to Come"
    - "The House of Black and White"
    - "High Sparrow"
    - "Sons of the Harpy"
    - "Kill the Boy"
    - "Unbowed, Unbent, Unbroken"
    - "The Gift"
    - "Hardhome"
    - "The Dance of Dragons"
    - "Mother's Mercy"
  - Game of Thrones Season 6
    - "The Red Woman"
    - "Home"
    - "Oathbreaker"
    - "Book of the Stranger"
    - "The Door"
    - "Blood of My Blood"
    - "The Broken Man"
    - "No One"
    - "Battle of the Bastards"
    - "The Winds of Winter"
  - Game of Thrones Season 7
    - "Dragonstone"
    - "Stormborn"
    - "The Queen's Justice"
    - "The Spoils of War"
    - "Eastwatch"
    - "Beyond the Wall"
    - "The Dragon and the Wolf"
  - Game of Thrones Season 8
    - "Winterfell"
    - "A Knight of the Seven Kingdoms"
    - "The Long Night"
    - "The Last of the Starks"
    - "The Bells"
    - "The Iron Throne"
  - Companion series
    - After the Thrones
    - Thronecast
- Awards and nominations received by Game of Thrones
- Game of Thrones characters
- Game of Thrones directors
- Music of Game of Thrones
- Game of Thrones title sequence

=== Tabletop games ===
- A Song of Ice and Fire tabletop games
  - Board game
    - First expansion
    - Second expansion
    - Second Edition
      - First expansion
      - Second Expansion
      - Third Expansion
  - Card game
    - Second edition

=== Video games ===
- A Song of Ice and Fire video games
  - A Game of Thrones: Genesis
  - Game of Thrones (2012)
  - Game of Thrones: Ascent
  - Game of Thrones (2014)
  - Game of Thrones: Conquest
  - Reigns: Game of Thrones
  - Game of Thrones: Seven Kingdoms

=== A Song of Ice and Fire role-playing games ===
- A Game of Thrones
- A Song of Ice and Fire Roleplaying

=== Other media ===
- Comic book series
- Second series

== World of A Song of Ice and Fire ==
=== Geography of The Known World ===
==== Westeros ====
- Regions of Westeros
  - The Crownlands
  - Dorne
  - The Iron Islands
  - The North
    - Beyond the Wall
  - The Reach
  - The Riverlands
  - The Stormlands
  - The Vale of Arryn
  - The Westerlands
- Strongholds of Westeros
  - Casterly Rock
  - Harrenhal
  - Highgarden
  - King's Landing
  - Old Town
  - Pyke
  - Riverrun
  - Storm's End
  - Sunspear
  - The Eyrie
  - The Twins
  - The Wall
  - Winterfell

=== People in The Known World ===
- Game of Thrones characters
- A Song of Ice and Fire characters
  - Petyr Baelish
  - Joffrey Baratheon
  - Renly Baratheon
  - Robert Baratheon
  - Stannis Baratheon
  - Tommen Baratheon
  - Ramsay Bolton
  - Roose Bolton
  - Bronn
  - Sandor Clegane
  - Khal Drogo
  - Tormund Giantsbane
  - Theon Greyjoy
  - Cersei Lannister
  - Jaime Lannister
  - Tyrion Lannister
  - Tywin Lannister
  - Oberyn Martell
  - Melisandre
  - Jorah Mormont
  - Daario Naharis
  - Davos Seaworth
  - Jon Snow
  - Arya Stark
  - Bran Stark
  - Catelyn Stark
  - Ned Stark
  - Robb Stark
  - Sansa Stark
  - Daenerys Targaryen
  - Viserys Targaryen
  - Samwell Tarly
  - Brienne of Tarth
  - Margaery Tyrell
  - Varys
  - Ygritte

==== Noble families ====
- House Stark
- House Lannister
- House Arryn
- House Baratheon
- House Bolton
- House Greyjoy
- House Martell
- House Targaryen
- House Tarly
- House Tully
- House Tyrell

=== Beings of The Known World ===
- Children of the Forest
- Direwolves
- Dragons
- White Walkers
  - Night King
- Wights

=== Languages of The Known World ===
Languages of A Song of Ice and Fire

- Dothraki
- Valyrian

=== Themes in A Song of Ice and Fire ===
- Iron Throne
- White Walker

== Fandom ==
- A Song of Ice and Fire fandom

== See also ==
- Sexposition
- Outline of fantasy
  - Discworld
  - Outline of Narnia
  - Outline of Middle-earth
