= The Rise of the Dragon =

2022 book by George R. R. Martin

- US first edition cover
- Author: George R. R. Martin; Elio M. García Jr.; Linda Antonsson
- Language: English
- Series: A Song of Ice and Fire
- Genre: Fantasy
- Published: October 25, 2022
- Publisher: Ten Speed Press
- Publication place: United States
- Media type: Print (Hardback)
- Pages: 352
- ISBN: 9781984859259

The Rise of the Dragon is a companion book by George R. R. Martin, Elio M. García Jr. and Linda Antonsson describing the history of House Targaryen from Aegon Targaryen's conquest of Westeros to the Dance of the Dragons civil war. It was released on October 25, 2022. In contrast to Fire & Blood, Martin described it as "written in a more encyclopedic style similar to The World of Ice & Fire".
