= A Song of Ice and Fire =

Series of novels by George R. R. Martin

- A Song of Ice and Fire book collection box set cover
- A Game of Thrones (1996); A Clash of Kings (1998); A Storm of Swords (2000); A Feast for Crows (2005); A Dance with Dragons (2011); The Winds of Winter (planned); A Dream of Spring (planned)
- Author: George R. R. Martin
- Country: United States
- Language: English
- Genre: High fantasy
- Publisher: Bantam Books (US, Canada); Voyager Books (UK, Australia)
- Published: August 1, 1996 – present
- Media type: Print (paperback & hardcover); Audiobook; E-book

A Song of Ice and Fire is a series of high fantasy novels by the American author George R. R. Martin. Martin began writing the first volume, A Game of Thrones, in 1991, and published it in 1996. Martin, who originally envisioned the series as a trilogy, has released five out of seven planned volumes. The most recent entry in the series, A Dance with Dragons, was published in 2011. Since then, Martin claims to have been working on the sixth novel, titled The Winds of Winter. A seventh novel, A Dream of Spring, is planned to follow.

A Song of Ice and Fire depicts a violent world dominated by political realism. What little supernatural power exists is confined to the margins of the known world. Moral ambiguity pervades the books, and many of the storylines frequently raise questions concerning loyalty, pride, human sexuality, piety, and the morality of violence. The story unfolds through an alternating set of subjective points of view, the success or survival of any of which is never assured. Each chapter is told from a limited third-person perspective, drawn from a group of characters that expands from nine in the first novel to thirty-one by the fifth.

The novels are set on the fictional continents of Westeros and Essos (the world as a whole does not have an established name). Martin's stated inspirations for the series include many supposed historic events. The work as a whole consists of three interwoven plots: a dynastic war among several families for control of Westeros, the ambition of the surviving members of the dethroned Targaryen dynasty to return from their exile in Essos and reassume the Iron Throne, and the growing threat posed by the powerful supernatural Others from the northernmost region of Westeros.

As of 2026, more than 100 million copies in 47 languages had been sold. The fourth and fifth volumes reached the top of the New York Times Best Seller lists when published in 2005 and 2011, respectively. Among the many derived works are several prequel novellas, three television series, a comic book adaptation, and several card, board, and video games. The series has received critical acclaim for its world-building, characters, and narrative.

== Plot synopsis ==
A Song of Ice and Fire takes place in a fictional world in which seasons often last for years and can end unpredictably. Before the events of the first novel, the Seven Kingdoms of Westeros were united under the Targaryen dynasty, establishing military supremacy through their control of dragons. The Targaryens ruled for nearly three hundred years, continuing beyond the extinction of the dragons. Their dynasty eventually ended with a rebellion led by Lord Robert Baratheon, in which Aerys II "the Mad King" Targaryen was killed, and Robert was proclaimed king of the Seven Kingdoms. At the beginning of A Game of Thrones, 15 years have passed since Robert's rebellion, with a nine-year-long summer nearing its end.

The principal story chronicles the power struggle for the Iron Throne among the great Houses of Westeros following the death of King Robert in A Game of Thrones. Robert's heir apparent, the 13-year-old Joffrey, is immediately proclaimed king through the machinations of his mother, Queen Cersei Lannister. When Lord Eddard "Ned" Stark — Robert's closest friend and chief advisor — discovers that Joffrey and his siblings are the product of incest between Cersei and her twin brother Ser Jaime Lannister, Eddard attempts to unseat Joffrey, but is betrayed and executed for treason. In response, Robert's younger brothers Stannis and Renly lay separate claims to the throne. During this period of instability, two of the Seven Kingdoms of Westeros attempt to become independent from the Iron Throne: Eddard's eldest son Robb is proclaimed King in the North, while Lord Balon Greyjoy desires to recover the independence of his kingdom, the Iron Islands. The so-called "War of the Five Kings" is in full progress by the middle of the second book, A Clash of Kings. This story is told principally through the perspectives of Eddard's wife Catelyn, their children Sansa, Arya, and Bran, and Jaime and Cersei's younger brother Tyrion Lannister, with more point-of-view characters added as the novels continue.

The second storyline stems from the far north of Westeros, where an 8,000-year-old wall of ice, simply called "the Wall", defends the Seven Kingdoms from supernatural creatures known as the Others. The Wall's sentinels, the Sworn Brotherhood of the Night's Watch, also protect the realm from incursions by the "wildlings" or "Free Folk", a number of human tribes living on the north side of the Wall. The story of The Night's Watch is told primarily through the point of view of Jon Snow, Lord Eddard Stark's bastard son. Jon follows in the footsteps of his paternal uncle Benjen Stark and joins the Watch at a young age, rising quickly through the ranks. He eventually becomes Lord Commander of the Night's Watch. In the third volume, A Storm of Swords, the Night's Watch storyline becomes increasingly entangled with the War of the Five Kings when King Stannis Baratheon arrives at the Wall.

The third storyline follows Daenerys Targaryen, daughter of Aerys II. On the continent of Essos, east of Westeros across the Narrow Sea, Daenerys is married off by her elder brother Viserys to a powerful warlord of the nomadic Dothraki. Over the course of her story, Daenerys slowly becomes an independent and intelligent ruler in her own right. Her rise to power is aided by the historic birth of three dragons, hatched from eggs given to her as wedding gifts. The three dragons soon become not only a symbol of her bloodline and her claim to the throne but also devastating weapons of war, which help her in the conquest of Slaver's Bay. The later books follow her ongoing conflict with the region's city-states, in which she aims to consolidate power, disrupt the Essosi slave trade, and gather support for her ambitions to reclaim Westeros.

== Publishing history ==
Books in the A Song of Ice and Fire series are first published in hardcover and are later re-released as paperback editions. In the UK, Harper Voyager publishes special slipcased editions. The series has also been translated into more than 30 languages. All page totals given below are for the US first editions.

#	Title	Pages	Chapters	Words	Audio	US release
1	A Game of Thrones	694	73	292,727	33 h 53 min	August 1996
2	A Clash of Kings	768	70	318,903	37 h 17 min	February 1999
3	A Storm of Swords	973	82	414,604	47 h 37 min	November 2000
4	A Feast for Crows	753	46	295,032	31 h 10 min	November 2005
5	A Dance with Dragons	1056	73	414,788	48 h 56 min	July 2011
6	The Winds of Winter	Forthcoming				
7	A Dream of Spring	Forthcoming				
Total		4,244	344	1,736,054	198 h 53 min	1996–present

=== First three novels (1991–2000) ===
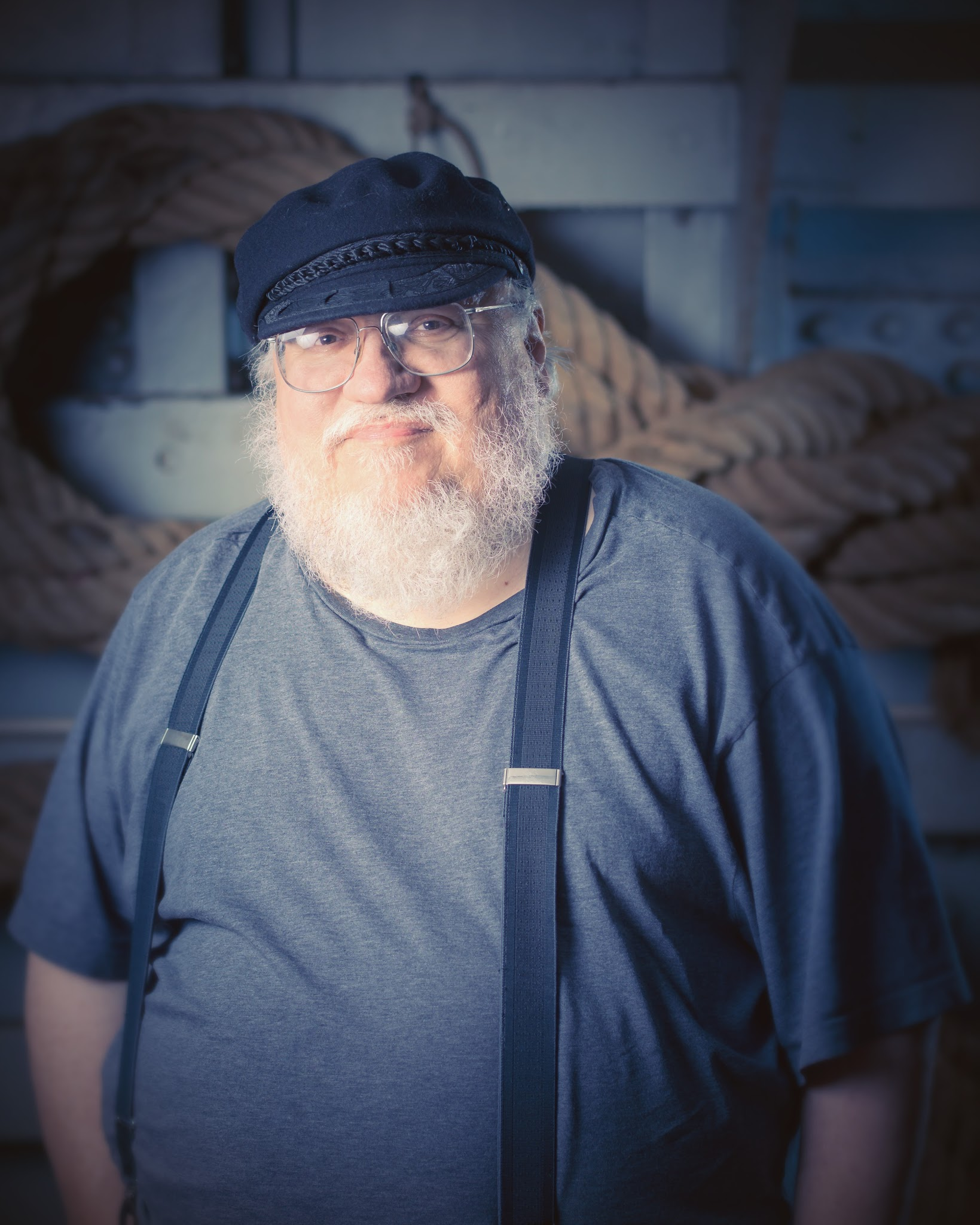
George R. R. Martin at Archipelacon in Mariehamn, Åland, Finland, 2015

George R. R. Martin was already a successful fantasy and sci-fi author and TV writer before writing his A Song of Ice and Fire book series. Martin had his first short story published in 1971 and his first novel in 1977. By the mid-1990s, he had won three Hugo Awards, two Nebula Awards, and other awards for his short fiction. Although his early books were well-received within the fantasy fiction community, his readership remained relatively small and Martin took on jobs as a writer in Hollywood in the mid-1980s. He worked principally on the revival of The Twilight Zone throughout 1986 and on Beauty and the Beast until 1990, but he also developed his own TV pilots and wrote feature film scripts. He grew frustrated that his pilots and screenplays were not getting made and that TV-related production limitations like budgets and episode lengths were forcing him to cut characters and trim battle scenes. This pushed Martin back towards writing books, where he did not have to worry about compromising the size of his imagination. Admiring the works of J. R. R. Tolkien in his childhood, he wanted to write an epic fantasy, though he did not have any specific ideas.

When Martin was between Hollywood projects in the summer of 1991, he started writing a new science fiction novel called Avalon. After three chapters, he had a vivid idea of a boy seeing a man's beheading and finding direwolves in the snow, which would eventually become the first non-prologue chapter of A Game of Thrones. Putting Avalon aside, Martin finished this chapter in a few days and grew certain that it was part of a longer story. After a few more chapters, Martin perceived his new book as a fantasy story and started making maps and genealogies. However, the writing of this book was interrupted for a few years when Martin returned to Hollywood to produce his TV series Doorways that ABC had ordered but ultimately never aired.

"The first scene...chapter one of the first book, the chapter where they find the direwolf pups...just came to me out of nowhere. I was...at work on a different novel, and suddenly I saw that scene. It didn't belong in the novel I was writing, but it came to me so vividly that I had to sit down and write it, and by the time I did, it led to a second chapter, and the second chapter was the Catelyn chapter where Ned has just come back."

— George R. R. Martin in 2014

In 1994, Martin gave his agent, Kirby McCauley, the first 200 pages and a two-page story projection as part of a planned trilogy with the novels A Dance with Dragons and The Winds of Winter intended to follow. When Martin had still not reached the novel's end at 1,400 manuscript pages, he felt that the series needed to be four and eventually six books long, which he imagined as two linked trilogies of one long story. Martin chose A Song of Ice and Fire as the overall series title: Martin saw the struggle of the cold Others and the fiery dragons as one possible meaning for "Ice and Fire", whereas the word "song" had previously appeared in Martin's book titles A Song for Lya and Songs the Dead Men Sing, stemming from his obsessions with songs. Martin also named Robert Frost's 1920 poem "Fire and Ice" and cultural associations such as passion versus betrayal as possible influences for the series' title.

The revised finished manuscript for A Game of Thrones was 1,088 pages long (without the appendices), with the publication following in August 1996. The Wheel of Time author Robert Jordan had written a short endorsement for the cover that was influential in ensuring the book's and hence series' early success with fantasy readers. Blood of the Dragon, a pre-release sample novella drawn from Daenerys's chapters, went on to win the 1997 Hugo Award for Best Novella. The first book was marketed as part of the "Song of Ice and Fire trilogy" in 1996, but by the second book's release, the "trilogy" suffix had been dropped and the series was retitled to A Song of Ice and Fire.

The 300 pages removed from the Game of Thrones manuscript served as the opening of the second book, entitled A Clash of Kings. It was released in February 1999 in the United States, with a manuscript length (without appendices) of 1,184 pages. A Clash of Kings was the first book of the Song of Ice and Fire series to make the best-seller lists, reaching 13 on The New York Times Best Seller list in 1999. After the success of The Lord of the Rings films, Martin received his first inquiries to the rights of the Song of Ice and Fire series from various producers and filmmakers.

Martin was several months late turning in the third book, A Storm of Swords. The last chapter he had written was about the "Red Wedding", a pivotal scene notable for its violence (see Themes: Violence and death). A Storm of Swords was 1,521 pages in manuscript (without appendices), causing problems for many of Martin's publishers around the world. Bantam Books published A Storm of Swords in a single volume in the United States in November 2000, whereas some other-language editions were divided into two, three, or even four volumes. A Storm of Swords debuted at number 12 in the New York Times bestseller list.

=== Bridging the timeline gap (2000–2011) ===
After A Game of Thrones, A Clash of Kings, and A Storm of Swords, Martin originally intended to write three more books. The fourth book, tentatively titled A Dance with Dragons, was to focus on Daenerys Targaryen's return to Westeros and the associated conflicts. Martin wanted to set this story five years after A Storm of Swords so that the younger characters could grow older and the dragons could grow larger. Agreeing with his publishers early on that the new book should be shorter than A Storm of Swords, Martin set out to write the novel closer in length to A Clash of Kings. A long prologue was to establish what had happened in the meantime, initially just as one chapter of Aeron Damphair on the Iron Islands at the Kingsmoot. Since the events on the Iron Islands were to have an impact in the book and could not be told with existing POV characters, Martin eventually introduced three new viewpoints.

In 2001, Martin was still optimistic that the fourth installment might be released in the last quarter of 2002. However, the five-year gap did not work for all characters during writing. On one hand, Martin was unsatisfied with covering the events during the gap solely through flashbacks and internal retrospection. On the other hand, it was implausible to have nothing happen for five years. After working on the book for about a year, Martin realized he needed an additional interim book, which he called A Feast for Crows. The book would pick up the story immediately after the third book, and Martin scrapped the idea of a five-year gap. The material of the written 250-page prologue was mixed in as new viewpoint characters from Dorne and the Iron Islands. These expanded storylines and the resulting story interactions complicated the plot for Martin.

The manuscript length of A Feast for Crows eventually surpassed A Storm of Swords. Martin was reluctant to make the necessary deep cuts to get the book down to publishable length, as that would have compromised the story he had in mind. Printing the book in "microtype on onion skin paper and giving each reader a magnifying glass" was also not an option for him. On the other hand, Martin rejected the publishers' idea of splitting the narrative chronologically into A Feast for Crows, Parts One and Two. Being already late with the book, Martin had not even started writing all characters' stories, and also objected to ending the first book without any resolution for its many viewpoint characters as in previous books.

With the characters spread out across the world, a friend suggested that Martin divide the story geographically into two volumes, of which A Feast for Crows would be the first. This approach would give Martin the room to complete his commenced story arcs as he had originally intended, which he still felt was the best approach years later. Martin moved the unfinished characters' stories set in the east (Essos) and north (Winterfell and the Wall) into the next book, A Dance with Dragons, and left A Feast for Crows to cover the events in King's Landing, the Riverlands, Dorne, and the Iron Islands. Both books begin immediately after the end of A Storm of Swords, running in parallel instead of sequentially, and involve different casts of characters with only little overlap. Martin split Arya's chapters into both books after having already moved the three other most popular characters (Jon Snow, Tyrion, and Daenerys) into A Dance with Dragons.

Upon its release in October 2005 in the UK and November 2005 in the US, A Feast for Crows went straight to the top of The New York Times bestseller list. Among the positive reviewers was Lev Grossman of Time, who dubbed Martin "the American Tolkien". However, fans and critics alike were disappointed with the story split that left the fates of several popular characters unresolved after A Storm of Swords' cliffhanger ending. With A Dance with Dragons said to be half-finished, Martin mentioned in the epilogue of A Feast for Crows that the next volume would be released by the next year. However, planned release dates were repeatedly pushed back. Meanwhile, HBO acquired the rights to turn A Song of Ice and Fire into a fantasy drama series in 2007 and aired the first of ten episodes covering A Game of Thrones in April 2011.

With around 1600 pages in manuscript length, A Dance with Dragons was eventually published in July 2011 after six years of writing, longer in page count and writing time than any of the preceding four novels. The story of A Dance with Dragons catches up with and goes beyond A Feast for Crows around two-thirds into the book, but nevertheless covers less story than Martin had intended, omitting at least one planned large battle sequence and leaving several character threads ending in cliffhangers. Martin attributed the delay mainly to his untangling "the Meereenese knot", which the interviewer understood as "making the chronology and characters mesh up as various threads converged on [Daenerys]". Martin also acknowledged spending too much time on rewriting and perfecting the story, but soundly rejected the theories of some of his critics that he had lost interest in the series or would bide his time to make more money.

=== Planned novels and future (2011–present) ===
Martin believed in 2012 the last two volumes of the series would be large books of 1500 manuscript pages each. The sixth book will be called The Winds of Winter, taking the title of the last book of the originally planned trilogy. Displeased with the provisional title A Time for Wolves for the final volume, Martin ultimately chose A Dream of Spring as the title for the seventh book in 2006. Martin said in March 2012 that the final two novels will take readers farther north than any of the previous books, and that the Others will appear. Martin indicated he would not permit another writer to finish the book series.

==== The Winds of Winter ====
The Winds of Winter is to resolve the cliffhangers from A Dance with Dragons early on and "will open with the two big battles that [the fifth book] was building up to, the Battle in the Ice and the Battle [...] of Slaver's Bay. And then take it from there." By the middle of 2010, Martin had already finished five chapters of The Winds of Winter from the viewpoints of Sansa Stark, Arya Stark, Arianne Martell, and Aeron Greyjoy, coming to around 100 completed pages. After the publication of A Dance with Dragons in 2011, Martin spent the remainder of the year on book tours, conventions, and continued working on his The World of Ice & Fire companion guide and a new Tales of Dunk and Egg novella. In December 2011, Martin posted a chapter from The Winds of Winter from the viewpoint of Theon Greyjoy; several other chapters have been made public since. Four hundred pages of the sixth novel had been written as of October 2012, although Martin considered only 200 as "really finished"; the rest needed revising. During the Guadalajara International Book Fair in Mexico in early December 2016, Martin offered the following hint as to the tone of this book: "There are a lot of dark chapters right now ... I've been telling you for 20 years that winter was coming. Winter is the time when things die, and cold and ice and darkness fill the world, so this is not going to be the happy feel-good that people may be hoping for. Some of the characters [are] in very dark places." Martin did not intend to separate the characters geographically again.

In 2011, Martin gave three years as a realistic estimate for finishing the sixth book at a good pace, but said ultimately the book "will be done when it's done", acknowledging that his publication estimates had been too optimistic in the past. In 2015 there were indications that the book would be published before the sixth season of the HBO show but in early January 2016 Martin confirmed that he had not met an end-of-year deadline that he had established with his publisher for release of the book before the sixth season. He also revealed there had been a previous deadline of October 2015 that he had considered achievable in May 2015, and that in September 2015 he had still considered the end-of-year deadline achievable. He further confirmed that some of the plot of the book might be revealed in the then-upcoming sixth season of Game of Thrones. In February 2016, Martin stated that he dropped all his editing projects except for Wild Cards, and that he would not be writing any teleplays, screenplays, short stories, introductions or forewords before delivering The Winds of Winter. In March 2020, Martin stated that he was writing The Winds of Winter every day, and in June he hoped to be done with it in 2021. In October 2022, Martin said that he had written approximately three quarters of the book. estimating that he had written approximately 1,100 to 1,200 pages, and had roughly 400 to 500 pages left. He gave a similar estimate in November 2023, saying that he was "struggling" with the manuscript. In July 2025 Martin said he had completed about 1,500 manuscript pages, suggesting the book was nearly complete, but then later said in January 2026 that he only had 1,100 manuscript pages finished.

==== A Dream of Spring ====
Martin is not firm about ending the series with the seventh novel. With his stated goal of telling the story from beginning to end, he will not truncate the story to fit into an arbitrary number of volumes. He knows the ending in broad strokes as well as the future of the main characters, and plans to finish the series with bittersweet elements where not everyone will live happily ever after. Martin hopes to write an ending similar to The Lord of the Rings that he felt gave the story a satisfying depth and resonance. On the other hand, Martin noted the challenge to avoid a situation like the finale of the TV series Lost, which left some fans disappointed by deviating too far from their own theories and desires.

In 2015, Martin said that he was not writing A Dream of Spring together with The Winds of Winter, and in early 2016, he said he did not believe A Dream of Spring would be published before the last season of the HBO show.

During a question-and-answer session at the 2016 Guadalajara International Book Fair, Martin emphasized: "I'm not going to tell you how I'm going to end my book, but I suspect the overall flavor is going to be as much bittersweet as it is happy."

In April 2018, Martin commented he had not started working on the book, and in November he said that after The Winds of Winter he would decide whether his next project after that would be A Dream of Spring, the second volume of Fire & Blood, or one or two stories for the Tales of Dunk and Egg.

In May 2019, Martin reiterated he had not started writing A Dream of Spring and would not do so before finishing The Winds of Winter.

==== Other writings ====
Regarding A Song of Ice and Fire as his masterpiece, Martin stated he would never write anything on this scale again and would only return to this fictional universe in the context of stand-alone novels. He prefers to write stories about characters from other A Song of Ice and Fire periods of history such as his Tales of Dunk and Egg project, instead of continuing the series directly. Martin said he would love to return to writing short stories, novellas, novelettes, and stand-alone novels from diverse genres such as science fiction, horror, fantasy, or even a murder mystery.

== Inspiration and writing ==
=== Genre ===
[Martin's Ice and Fire series] was groundbreaking (at least for me) in all kinds of ways. Above all, the books were extremely unpredictable, especially in a genre where readers have come to expect the intensely predictable. [...] A Game of Thrones was profoundly shocking when I first read it, and fundamentally changed my notions about what could be done with epic fantasy.

— Fantasy writer Joe Abercrombie in 2008

George R. R. Martin believes the most profound influences to be the ones experienced in childhood. Having read H. P. Lovecraft, Robert E. Howard, Robert A. Heinlein, Eric Frank Russell, Andre Norton, Isaac Asimov, Fritz Leiber, and Mervyn Peake in his youth, Martin never categorized these authors' literature into science fiction, fantasy, or horror and will write from any genre as a result. Martin classified A Song of Ice and Fire as "epic fantasy", and specifically named Tad Williams' high fantasy epic Memory, Sorrow, and Thorn as very influential for the writing of the series. One of his favorite authors is Jack Vance, although Martin considered the series not particularly Vancean.

Martin experienced some harsh winters when living in Dubuque a few years in the 1970s, and suspects these winters had an influence on his writing: "I think a lot of the stuff in A Game of Thrones, the snow and ice and freezing, comes from my memories of Dubuque".

The medieval setting has been the traditional background for epic fantasy. However, where historical fiction leaves versed readers knowing the historical outcome, original characters may increase suspense and empathy for the readers. Yet Martin felt historical fiction, particularly when set during the Middle Ages, had an excitement, grittiness, and a realness to it that was absent in fantasy with a similar backdrop. Thus, he wanted to combine the realism of historical fiction with the magic appeal of the best fantasies, subduing magic in favor of battles and political intrigue. He also decided to avoid the conventional good versus evil setting typical for the genre, using the fight between Achilles and Hector in Homer's Iliad, where no one stands out as either a hero or a villain, as an example of what he wants to achieve with his books.

Martin is widely credited with broadening the fantasy fiction genre for adult content. Writing for The Atlantic, Amber Taylor assessed the novels as hard fantasy with vulnerable characters to which readers become emotionally attached. CNN found in 2000 that Martin's mature descriptions were "far more frank than those found in the works of other fantasy authors", although Martin assessed the fantasy genre to have become rougher-edged a decade later and that some writers' work was going beyond the mature themes of his novels. Adam Roberts called Martin's series the most successful and popular example of the emerging subgenre of grimdark fantasy.

=== Writing process ===
Setting out to write something on an epic scale, Martin projected to write three books of 800 manuscript pages in the very early stages of the series. His original 1990s contract specified one-year deadlines for his previous literary works, but Martin only realized later that his new books were longer and hence required more writing time. In 2000, Martin planned to take 18 months to two years for each volume and projected the last of the planned six books to be released five or six years later. However, with the A Song of Ice and Fire series evolving into the biggest and most ambitious story he has ever attempted writing, he still has two more books to finish as of 2025. Martin said he needed to be in his own office in Santa Fe, New Mexico to immerse himself in the fictional world and write. As of 2011, Martin was still typing his fiction on an IBM PC compatible computer running MS-DOS with WordStar 4.0. He begins each day at 10 am with rewriting and polishing the previous day's work, and may write all day or struggle to write anything. Excised material and previous old versions are saved to be possibly re-inserted at a later time. Martin does not consider A Song of Ice and Fire a "series" but a single story published in several volumes.

Martin set the A Song of Ice and Fire story in a secondary world inspired by Tolkien's writing. Unlike Tolkien, who created entire languages, mythologies, and histories for Middle-earth long before writing The Lord of the Rings, Martin usually starts with a rough sketch of an imaginary world that he improvises into a workable fictional setting along the way. He described his writing as coming from a subconscious level in "almost a daydreaming process", and his stories, which have a mythic rather than a scientific core, draw from emotion instead of rationality. Martin employs maps and a cast list topping 60 pages in the fourth volume, but keeps most information in his mind. His imagined backstory remains subject to change until published, and only the novels count as canon. Martin does not intend to publish his private notes after the series is finished.

Martin drew much inspiration from actual history for the series, having several bookcases filled with medieval history for research and visiting historic European landmarks. For an American who speaks only English, the history of England proved the easiest source of medieval history for him, giving the series a British rather than a German or Spanish historic flavor. For example, Ned and Robb Stark resemble Richard, 3rd Duke of York, and his son Edward IV, and Queen Cersei resembles both Margaret of Anjou and Elizabeth Woodville. Martin immersed himself in many diverse medieval topics such as clothing, food, feasting, and tournaments to have the facts at hand if needed during writing. The series was in particular influenced by the Hundred Years' War, the Crusades, the Albigensian Crusade, and the Wars of the Roses, although Martin refrained from making any direct adaptations. Martin was also inspired by the French historical novels The Accursed Kings by Maurice Druon, which are about the French monarchy in the 13th and 14th centuries. Martin has also said that important events of the narrative, such as the "Red Wedding", a crucial plot point in A Storm of Swords, are based on events in Scottish history such as the Black Dinner of 1440 and the Massacre of Glencoe in 1692.

Martin has also drawn from Roman history for inspiration, comparing Stannis Baratheon to the Roman Emperor Tiberius.

The story is written to follow principal landmarks with an ultimate destination, but leaves Martin room for improvisation. On occasion, improvised details significantly affected the planned story. By the fourth book, Martin kept more private notes than ever before to keep track of the many subplots, which became so detailed and sprawling by the fifth book as to be unwieldy. Martin's editors, copy editors, and readers monitor for accidental mistakes, although some errors have slipped into publication. For instance, Martin has inconsistently referred to certain characters' eye colors, and has described a horse as being of one sex and then another.

=== Narrative structure ===
Number of chapters per point-of-view character
POV character	Game	Clash	Storm	Feast	Dance	Winds	Sum
Bran Stark	7	7	4		3		21
Catelyn Stark	11	7	7				25
Daenerys Targaryen	10	5	6		10		31
Eddard Stark	15						15
Jon Snow	9	8	12		13		42
Arya Stark	5	10	13	3	2	≥1	≥34
Tyrion Lannister	9	15	11		12	≥2	≥49
Sansa Stark	6	8	7	3		≥1	≥25
Davos Seaworth		3	6		4		13
Theon Greyjoy		6			7	≥1	≥14
Jaime Lannister			9	7	1		17
Samwell Tarly			5	5			10
Aeron Greyjoy				2		≥1	≥3
Areo Hotah				1	1	≥1	≥3
Cersei Lannister				10	2		12
Brienne of Tarth				8			8
Asha Greyjoy				1	3		4
Arys Oakheart				1			1
Victarion Greyjoy				2	2	≥1	≥5
Arianne Martell				2		≥2	≥4
Quentyn Martell					4		4
Jon Connington					2		2
Melisandre					1		1
Barristan Selmy					4		4
Prologue/Epilogue	1/–	1/–	1/1	1/–	1/1	1/TBD	≥8
Total (characters)	73 (9)	70 (10)	82 (12)	46 (13)	73 (18)	≥13 (≥9)	≥357 (≥24)

Appears as a POV character
Appears as a non-POV character
No appearance

The books are divided into chapters, each one narrated in the third person limited through the eyes of a point of view character, an approach Martin learned himself as a young journalism student. Beginning with nine POV characters in A Game of Thrones, the number of POV characters grows to a total of 31 in A Dance with Dragons (see table). The short-lived one-time POV characters are mostly restricted to the prologues and epilogues. David Orr of The New York Times noted the importance of "the Starks (good guys), the Targaryens (at least one good guy, or girl), the Lannisters (conniving), the Greyjoys (mostly conniving), the Baratheons (mixed bag), the Tyrells (unclear), and the Martells (ditto), most of whom are feverishly endeavoring to advance their ambitions and ruin their enemies, preferably unto death". However, as Time's Lev Grossman noted, readers "experience the struggle for Westeros from all sides at once", such that "every fight is both triumph and tragedy [...] and everybody is both hero and villain at the same time".

Modeled on The Lord of the Rings, the story of A Song of Ice and Fire begins with a tight focus on a small group (with everyone in Winterfell, except Daenerys) and then splits into separate stories. The storylines are to converge again, but finding the turning point in this complex series has been difficult for Martin and has slowed down his writing. Depending on the interview, Martin is said to have reached the turning point in A Dance with Dragons, or to not quite have reached it yet in the books. The series' structure of multiple POVs and interwoven storylines was inspired by Wild Cards, a multi-authored shared universe book series edited by Martin since 1985. As the sole author, Martin begins each new book with an outline of the chapter order and may write a few successive chapters from a single character's viewpoint instead of working chronologically. The chapters are later rearranged to optimize character intercutting, chronology, and suspense.

Influenced by his television and film scripting background, Martin tries to keep readers engrossed by ending each Song of Ice and Fire chapter with a tense or revelational moment, a twist or a cliffhanger, similar to a TV act break. Scriptwriting has also taught him the technique of "cutting out the fat and leaving the muscle", which is the final stage of completing a book, a technique that brought the page count in A Dance with Dragons down almost eighty pages. Dividing the continuous Song of Ice and Fire story into books is much harder for Martin. Each book shall represent a phase of the journey that ends in closure for most characters. A smaller portion of characters is left with clear-cut cliffhangers to make sure readers come back for the next installment, although A Dance with Dragons had more cliffhangers than Martin originally intended. Both one-time and regular POV characters are designed to have full character arcs ending in tragedy or triumph, and are written to hold the readers' interest and not be skipped in reading. Main characters are killed off so that the reader will not rely on the hero to come through unscathed and will instead feel the character's fear with each page turn.

The unresolved larger narrative arc encourages speculation about future story events. According to Martin, much of the key to A Song of Ice and Fire's future lies over a dozen years in the fictional past, of which each volume reveals more. Events planned from the beginning are foreshadowed, although Martin is careful not to make the story predictable. The viewpoint characters, who serve as unreliable narrators, may clarify or provide different perspectives on past events. Therefore, what the readers believe to be true may not necessarily be true.

=== Character development ===
Regarding the characters as the heart of the story, Martin planned the epic A Song of Ice and Fire to have a large cast of characters and many different settings from the beginning. A Feast for Crows has a 63-page list of characters, with many of the thousands of characters mentioned only in passing or disappearing from view for long stretches. When Martin adds a new family to the ever-growing number of genealogies in the appendices, he devises a secret about the personality or fate of the family members. However, their backstory remains subject to change until written down in the story. Martin drew most character inspiration from history (without directly translating historical figures) and his own experiences, but also from the manners of his friends, acquaintances, and people of public interest. Martin aims to "make my characters real and to make them human, characters who have good and bad, noble and selfish well-mixed in their natures". Jeff VanderMeer of the Los Angeles Times remarked that "Martin's devotion to fully inhabiting his characters, for better or worse, creates the unstoppable momentum in his novels and contains an implied criticism of Tolkien's moral simplicity" (see Themes: Moral ambiguity).

Martin deliberately ignored the writing rule of never giving two characters names starting with the same letter. Instead, character names reflect the naming systems in various European family histories, where particular names were associated with specific royal houses and where even the secondary families assigned the same names repeatedly. The story of A Song of Ice and Fire therefore has children called "Robert" in honor of King Robert of House Baratheon, a "Brandon" in many generations of the Starks in commemoration of Brandon the Builder (of the Wall), and the syllable "Ty" commonly occurring in given names of House Lannister. Confident that readers would pay attention, Martin distinguished people sharing a given name by adding numbers or locations to their given names (e.g. Henry V of England). The family names were designed in association with ethnic groups (see backstory): the First Men in the North of Westeros had very simply descriptive names like Stark and Strong, whereas the descendants of the Andal invaders in the South have more elaborate, undescriptive house names like Lannister or Arryn, and the Targaryens (being Valyrians from the Eastern continent), have the most exotic names with the letter Y.

All characters are designed to speak with their own internal voices to capture their views of the world. The Atlantic pondered whether Martin ultimately intended the readers to sympathize with characters on both sides of the Lannister–Stark feud long before plot developments force them to make their emotional choices. Contrary to most conventional epic fantasies, the characters of A Song of Ice and Fire are vulnerable so that, according to The Atlantic, the reader "cannot be sure that good shall triumph, which makes those instances where it does all the more exulting." Martin gets emotionally involved in the characters' lives during writing, which makes the chapters with dreadful events sometimes very difficult to write. Seeing the world through the characters' eyes requires a certain amount of empathy with them, including the villains, all of whom he has said he loves as if they were his own children. Martin found that some characters had minds of their own and took his writing in different directions. He returns to the intended story if it does not work out, but these detours sometimes prove more rewarding for him.

Arya Stark, Tyrion Lannister, Jon Snow, and Daenerys Targaryen generate the most feedback from readers. They are also four of the "big six" main characters of the series, according to Martin (the other two being Sansa Stark and Bran Stark). Martin has stated that Tyrion is his personal favorite, as the grayest of the gray characters, with his cunning and wit making him the most fun to write. Martin has also said that Bran Stark is the hardest character to write. As the character most deeply involved in magic, Bran's story needs to be handled carefully within the supernatural aspects of the books. Bran is also the youngest viewpoint character, and has to deal with the series' adult themes like grief, loneliness, and anger. Martin set out to have the young characters grow up faster between chapters, but, as it was implausible for a character to take two months to respond, a finished book represents very little time passed. Martin hoped the planned five-year break would ease the situation and age the children to almost adults in terms of the Seven Kingdoms, but he later dropped the five-year gap (see section Bridging the timeline gap).

== Themes ==
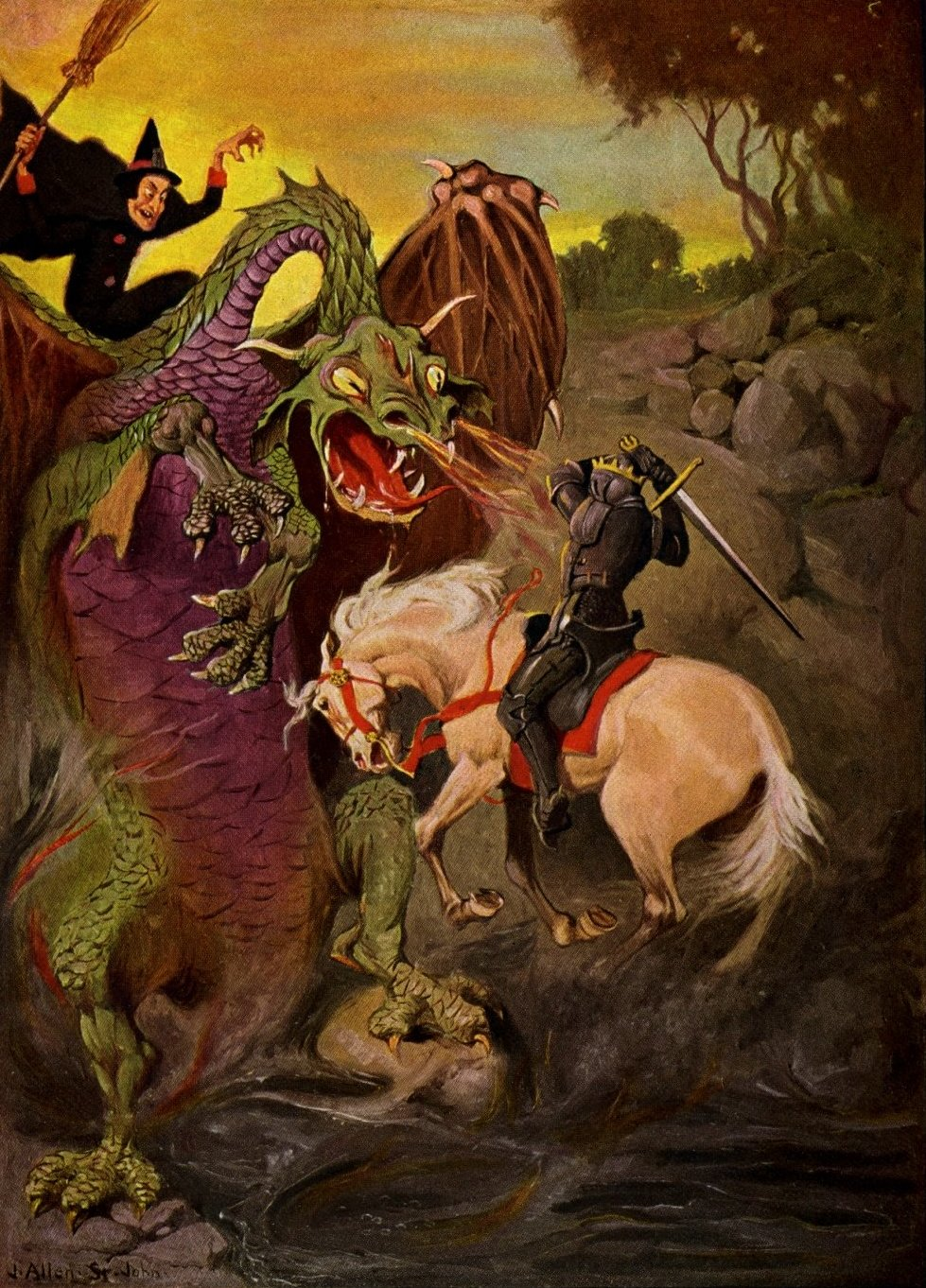
Although involving dragons and sorcery, A Song of Ice and Fire series de-emphasizes magic as compared to many other epic fantasy works (emblem of J. Allen St. John's 1905 fantasy work The Face in the Pool).

Wheareas modern fantasy often embraces magical elements, A Song of Ice and Fire series is generally praised for what is perceived as a sort of medieval realism. Believing that magic should be used moderately in the epic fantasy genre, Martin set out to make the story feel more like historical fiction than contemporary fantasy, with less emphasis on magic and more on battles, political intrigue, and the characters. Though the amount of magic has gradually increased throughout the story, the series is still to end with less overt magic than most contemporary fantasies. In Martin's eyes, literary effective magic needs to represent strange and dangerous forces beyond human comprehension, not advanced alien technologies or formulaic spells. As such, the characters understand only the natural aspects of their world, but not the magical elements like the Others.

Since Martin drew on historical sources to build the world of A Song of Ice and Fire, Damien G. Walter of The Guardian saw a strong resemblance between Westeros and England in the period of the Wars of the Roses. The Atlantic's Adam Serwer regarded A Song of Ice and Fire as "more a story of politics than one of heroism, a story about humanity wrestling with its baser obsessions than fulfilling its glorious potential", where the emergent power struggle stems from the feudal system's repression and not from the fight between good and evil. Martin not only wanted to reflect the frictions of the medieval class structures in the novels, but also explore the consequences of the leaders' decisions, as general goodness does not automatically make competent leaders and vice versa.

A common theme in the fantasy genre is the battle between good and evil, which Martin rejects for not mirroring the real world. Attracted to gray characters, Martin instead endorses William Faulkner's view that only the human heart in conflict with itself was worth writing about. Martin explores the questions of redemption and character change in the A Song of Ice and Fire series. The multiple viewpoint structure allows characters to be explored from many sides, such that the supposed villains can provide their viewpoint.

Although fantasy comes from an imaginative realm, Martin sees an honest necessity to reflect the real world where people, even beloved people, sometimes die ugly deaths. Main characters are killed off so that the reader will not expect the supposed hero to survive, and instead will feel the same tension and fear that the characters might. The novels also reflect the substantial death rates in war. The deaths of supernumerary extras, or of orcs or their equivalents, have no major effect on readers, whereas a friend's death has much more emotional impact. Martin prefers a hero's sacrifice to say something profound about human nature.

According to Martin, the fantasy genre rarely focuses on sex and sexuality, instead often treating sexuality in a juvenile way or neglecting it completely. Martin, however, considers sexuality an important driving force in human life that should not be excluded from the narrative. Providing sensory detail for an immersive experience is more important than plot advancement for Martin, who aims to let the readers experience the novels' sex scenes, "whether it's a great transcendent, exciting, mind blowing sex, or whether it's disturbing, twisted, dark sex, or disappointing perfunctory sex." Martin was fascinated by medieval contrasts where knights venerated their ladies with poems and wore their favors in tournaments while their armies mindlessly raped women in wartime. The non-existent concept of adolescence in the Middle Ages served as a model for Daenerys' sexual activity at the age of 13 in the books. The novels also allude to the incestuous practices in the Ptolemaic dynasty of Ancient Egypt to keep their bloodlines pure.

Martin provides a variety of female characters to explore the place of women in a patriarchal society. Writing all characters as human beings with the same basic needs, dreams, and influences, his female characters are to cover the same wide spectrum of human traits as the males.

== Reception ==
=== Critical response ===
Science Fiction Weekly stated in 2000 "Few would dispute that Martin's most monumental achievement to date has been the groundbreaking A Song of Ice and Fire historical fantasy series", for which reviews have been "orders of magnitude better" than for his previous works, as Martin described to The New Yorker. In 2007, Weird Tales magazine described the series as a "superb fantasy saga" that "raised Martin to a whole new level of success". Shortly before the release of A Dance with Dragons in 2011, Bill Sheehan of The Washington Post was sure that "no work of fantasy has generated such anticipation since Harry Potter's final duel with Voldemort", and Ethan Sacks of Daily News saw the series turning Martin into a darling of literary critics as well as mainstream readers, which was "rare for a fantasy genre that's often dismissed as garbage not fit to line the bottom of a dragon's cage". Salon.com's Andrew Leonard stated:

The success is all the more remarkable because [the series debuted] without mass market publicity or any kind of buzz in the fantasy/SF scene. George R. R. Martin earned his following the hard way, by word of mouth, by hooking his characters into the psyche of his readers to an extent that most writers of fantasy only dream of.

Publishers Weekly noted in 2000 that "Martin may not rival Tolkien or Robert Jordan, but he ranks with such accomplished medievalists of fantasy as Poul Anderson and Gordon Dickson." After the fourth volume came out in 2005, Time's Lev Grossman considered Martin a "major force for evolution in fantasy" and proclaimed him "the American Tolkien", explaining that, although Martin was "[not] the best known of America's straight-up fantasy writers" at the time and would "never win a Pulitzer or a National Book Award ... his skill as a crafter of narrative exceeds that of almost any literary novelist writing today". As Grossman said in 2011, the phrase American Tolkien "has stuck to [Martin], as it was meant to", being picked up by the media including The New York Times ("He's much better than that"), the New Yorker, Entertainment Weekly ("an acclaim that borders on fantasy blasphemy"), The Globe and Mail, and USA Today. Time magazine named Martin one of the 100 most influential people in the world in 2011, and USA Today named George R. R. Martin their Author of the Year 2011.

According to The Globe and Mail's John Barber, Martin manages simultaneously to master and transcend the genre so that "Critics applaud the depth of his characterizations and lack of cliché in books that are nonetheless replete with dwarves and dragons". Publishers Weekly gave favorable reviews to the first three A Song of Ice and Fire novels at their points of release, saying that A Game of Thrones had "superbly developed characters, accomplished prose and sheer bloody-mindedness", that A Clash of Kings was "notable particularly for the lived-in quality of [their fictional world and] for the comparatively modest role of magic", and that A Storm of Swords was one "of the more rewarding examples of gigantism in contemporary fantasy". However, they found that A Feast for Crows as the fourth installment "sorely misses its other half. The slim pickings here are tasty, but in no way satisfying." Their review for A Dance with Dragons repeated points of criticism for the fourth volume, and said that, although "The new volume has a similar feel to Feast", "Martin keeps it fresh by focusing on popular characters [who were] notably absent from the previous book."

According to the Los Angeles Times, "Martin's brilliance in evoking atmosphere through description is an enduring hallmark of his fiction, the settings much more than just props on a painted stage", and the novels captivate readers with "complex storylines, fascinating characters, great dialogue, perfect pacing, and the willingness to kill off even his major characters". CNN remarked that "the story weaves through differing points of view in a skillful mix of observation, narration and well-crafted dialogue that illuminates both character and plot with fascinating style", and David Orr of The New York Times found that "All of his hundreds of characters have grace notes of history and personality that advance a plot line. Every town has an elaborately recalled series of triumphs and troubles." Salon.com's Andrew Leonard "couldn't stop reading Martin because my desire to know what was going to happen combined with my absolute inability to guess what would happen and left me helpless before his sorcery. At the end, I felt shaken and exhausted." The Christian Science Monitor advised reading the novels with an A Song of Ice and Fire encyclopedia at hand to "catch all the layered, subtle hints and details that [Martin] leaves throughout his books. If you pay attention, you will be rewarded and questions will be answered."

Among the most critical voices were Sam Jordison and Michael Hann, both of The Guardian. Jordison detailed his misgivings about A Game of Thrones in a 2009 review and summarized "It's daft. It's unsophisticated. It's cartoonish. And yet, I couldn't stop reading .... Archaic absurdity aside, Martin's writing is excellent. His dialogue is snappy and frequently funny. His descriptive prose is immediate and atmospheric, especially when it comes to building a sense of deliciously dark foreboding [of the long impending winter]." Hann did not consider the novels to stand out from the general fantasy genre, despite Martin's alterations to fantasy convention, although he rediscovered his childhood's views:

That when things are, on the whole, pretty crappy [in the real world], it's a deep joy to dive headfirst into something so completely immersive, something from which there is no need to surface from hours at a time. And if that immersion involves dragons, magic, wraiths from beyond death, shapeshifting wolves and banished princes, so be it.

=== Sales ===
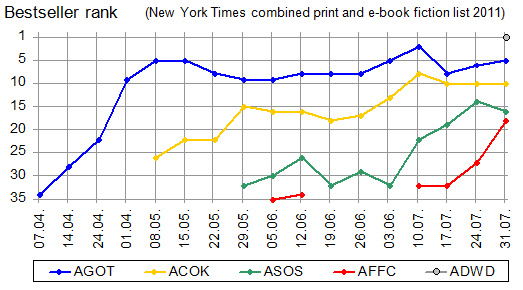
Sales performance of A Song of Ice and Fire series in the New York Times combined print and e-book fiction bestseller list in 2011 between the airing of the Game of Thrones pilot episode and the publication of A Dance with Dragons.

The reported overall sales figures of the A Song of Ice and Fire series vary. The New Yorker said in April 2011 (before the publication of A Dance with Dragons) that more than 15 million A Song of Ice and Fire books had been sold worldwide, a figure repeated by The Globe and Mail in July 2011. Reuters reported in September 2013 that the books including print, digital and audio versions have sold more than 24 million copies in North America. The Wall Street Journal reported more than six million sold copies in North America by May 2011. USA Today reported 8.5 million copies in print and digital overall in July 2011, and over 12 million sold copies in print in December 2011. The series has been translated into more than 20 languages; USA Today reported the fifth book to be translated into over 40 languages. Forbes estimated that Martin was the 12th highest-earning author worldwide in 2011 at $15 million.

Martin's publishers initially expected A Game of Thrones to be a best-seller, but the first installment did not even reach any lower positions in the bestseller list. This left Martin unsurprised, as it is "a fool's game to think anything is going to be successful or to count on it". However, the book slowly won the passionate advocacy of independent booksellers and the book's popularity grew by word of mouth. The series' popularity skyrocketed in subsequent volumes, with the second and third volumes making The New York Times Best Seller lists in 1999 and 2000, respectively. The series gained Martin's old writings new attention, and Martin's American publisher Bantam Spectra was to reprint his out-of-print solo novels.

The fourth installment, A Feast for Crows, was an immediate best-seller at its 2005 release, hitting number one on "The New York Times" hardcover fiction bestseller list November 27, 2005, which for a fantasy novel suggested that Martin's books were attracting mainstream readers. The paperback edition of A Game of Thrones reached its 34th printing in 2010, surpassing the one million mark. Before it even premiered, the TV series had boosted sales of the book series, with A Song of Ice and Fire approaching triple-digit growth in year-on-year sales. Bantam was looking forward to seeing the tie-ins boost sales further, and Martin's British publisher Harper Voyager expected readers to rediscover their other epic fantasy literature. With a reported 4.5 million copies of the first four volumes in print in early 2011, the four volumes re-appeared on the paperback fiction bestseller lists in the second quarter of 2011.

At its point of publication in July 2011, A Dance with Dragons was in its sixth print with more than 650,000 hardbacks in print. It also had the highest single and first-day sales of any new fiction title published in 2011 at that point, with 170,000 hardcovers, 110,000 e-books, and 18,000 audio books reportedly sold on the first day. A Dance with Dragons reached the top of The New York Times bestseller list on July 31, 2011. Unlike most other big titles, the fifth volume sold more physical than digital copies early on, but nevertheless, Martin became the tenth author to sell 1 million Amazon Kindle e-books. All five volumes and the four-volume boxed set were among the top 100 best-selling books in the United States in 2011 and 2012.

The TV series has contributed significantly boosting sales of both the books and collectibles like box-sets, merchandise, and other items. The TV series also contributed to increasing the geographic coverage of the books, introducing new customers in emerging countries like India and Brazil to the book series. All this has significantly increased the overall book sales. As of April 2019, the book series has sold 90 million copies worldwide.

=== Fandom ===
"After all, as some of you like to point out in your emails, I am sixty years old and fat, and you don't want me to 'pull a Robert Jordan' on you and deny you your book. Okay, I've got the message. You don't want me doing anything except A Song of Ice and Fire. Ever. (Well, maybe it's okay if I take a leak once in a while?)"

— George R. R. Martin on his blog in 2009

During the 1980s and early 1990s, Martin's novels had slowly earned him a reputation in science fiction circles, although he said to only have received a few fans' letters a year in the pre-internet days. The publication of A Game of Thrones caused Martin's following to grow, with fan sites springing up and a Trekkie-like society of followers evolving that meet regularly. Westeros.org, one of the main A Song of Ice and Fire fansites with about seventeen thousand registered members as of 2011, was co-founded in 1999 by a Swedish-based fan of Cuban descent, Elio M. García Jr., as well as Linda Antonsson, who introduced him to the series; their involvement with Martin's work has now become semi-professional. The Brotherhood Without Banners, an unofficial fan club operating globally, was formed in 2001. Their founders and other longtime members are among Martin's good friends.

Martin runs an official website and administers a lively blog with the assistance of Ty Franck. He also interacts with fandom by answering emails and letters, although he stated in 2005 that their sheer numbers might leave them unanswered for years. Since there are different types of conventions nowadays, he tends to go to three or four science-fiction conventions a year simply to go back to his roots and meet friends. He does not read message boards anymore, so that his writing will not be influenced by fans foreseeing twists and interpreting characters differently from what he intended.

While Martin calls the majority of his fans "great", and enjoys interacting with them, he lost some of them because of the six years it took to release A Dance with Dragons. A movement of disaffected fans called GRRuMblers formed in 2009, creating sites such as Finish the Book, George and Is Winter Coming? When fans' vocal impatience for A Dance with Dragons peaked shortly after, Martin issued a statement called "To My Detractors" on his blog that received media attention. The New York Times noted that it was not uncommon for Martin to be mobbed at book signings. The New Yorker called this "an astonishing amount of effort to devote to denouncing the author of books one professes to love. Few contemporary authors can claim to have inspired such passion."

=== Awards and nominations ===
- A Game of Thrones (1996) – Locus Award winner, World Fantasy Award and Nebula Award nominee, 1997
- A Clash of Kings (1998) – Locus Award winner, Nebula Award nominee, 1999
- A Storm of Swords (2000) – Locus Award winner, Hugo Award and Nebula Awards nominee, 2001
- A Feast for Crows (2005) – Hugo, Locus, and British Fantasy Awards nominee, 2006
- A Dance with Dragons (2011) – Locus Award winner, Hugo Award and World Fantasy Award nominee, 2012

== Derived works ==
=== Prequels ===
==== Tales of Dunk and Egg ====
The Tales of Dunk and Egg series, three novellas set 90 years before the events of the novel series, feature the adventures of Ser Duncan the Tall and his squire "Egg", who later became King Aegon V Targaryen. The stories have no direct connection to the plot of A Song of Ice and Fire, although characters from it are mentioned in the series. The first installment, The Hedge Knight, was published in the 1998 anthology Legends. The Sworn Sword followed in 2003, published in Legends II. Both were later adapted into graphic novels. The third novella, The Mystery Knight, was first published in the 2010 anthology Warriors and in 2017 it was adapted as a graphic novel, as well. In 2015, the first three novellas were published as one illustrated collection, A Knight of the Seven Kingdoms.

==== Fire & Blood ====
The novella The Princess and the Queen, or, the Blacks and the Greens appeared in Tor Books's 2013 anthology Dangerous Women and explains some of the Targaryen backstory two centuries before the events of the novels. The Rogue Prince, or, a King's Brother, published in the 2014 anthology Rogues, is itself a prequel to the events of The Princess and the Queen. The novella The Sons of the Dragon, published in the 2017 anthology The Book of Swords, is the story of Aegon the Conqueror's two sons Aenys I and Maegor I "The Cruel".

All three of these stories were incorporated as parts of Fire & Blood, a book chronicling Martin's complete history of the House Targaryen line, released in two volumes. The first volume was released on November 20, 2018.

=== Companion books ===
- A Feast of Ice and Fire (2012)
- The Lands of Ice and Fire (2012)
- The World of Ice and Fire (2014), with Elio M. García Jr. and Linda Antonsson
- The Wit & Wisdom of Tyrion Lannister (2013)
- The Official A Game of Thrones Coloring Book (2015)
- The Rise of the Dragon (2022), with Elio M. García Jr. and Linda Antonsson

=== Chapter sets ===
Chapter sets from the novels were also compiled into three novellas that were released between 1996 and 2003 by Asimov's Science Fiction and Dragon:

- Blood of the Dragon (July 1996), taken from the Daenerys Targaryen chapters in A Game of Thrones
- Path of the Dragon (December 2000), taken from the Daenerys chapters in A Storm of Swords
- Arms of the Kraken (March 2003), based on the Iron Islands chapters from A Feast for Crows

=== Comic book adaptation ===
- A Game of Thrones (comics) (2011-2014)
- A Clash of Kings (comics) (2017-2021)

The Tales of Dunk and Egg novellas were, in addition, adapted as graphic novels:

- Martin, George R.R.; Avery, Ben; Miller, Mike S.; Crowell, Mike (2005). The Hedge Knight (2. ed.). Dabel Bros. ISBN 978-0-9764011-0-0.
- Martin, George R.R.; Avery, Ben; Miller, Mike S. (2008). Sworn Sword. Marvel. ISBN 978-0-7851-2650-8.
- Martin, George R.R.; Avery, Ben; Miller, Mike S. (2017). The Mystery Knight. Random House. ISBN 978-0-3455-4939-6.

=== Television series ===
==== Game of Thrones (2011–2019) ====
With the popularity of the series growing, HBO optioned A Song of Ice and Fire for a television adaptation in 2007. A pilot episode was produced in late 2009, and a series commitment for nine further episodes was made in March 2010. The series, titled Game of Thrones, premiered in April 2011 to great acclaim and ratings (see Game of Thrones § Reception). The network picked up the show for a second season covering A Clash of Kings two days later. Shortly after the conclusion of the first season, the show received 13 Emmy Award nominations, including Outstanding Drama Series, winning Outstanding Main Title Design and Outstanding Supporting Actor in a Drama Series for Peter Dinklage's portrayal of Tyrion Lannister. HBO renewed Game of Thrones for a third season in April 2012, ten days after the season 2 premiere. Due to the length of the corresponding book, the third season only covered roughly the first half of A Storm of Swords.

Early during the development of the TV series, Martin told major plot points to producers David Benioff and D. B. Weiss. Martin was confident he would have published at least The Winds of Winter before the TV series overtook him. Nevertheless, there were general concerns about whether Martin would be able to stay ahead of the show. As a result, head writers Benioff and Weiss learned more future plot points from Martin in 2013 to help them set up the show's new possible seasons. This included the end stories for all the core characters. Deviations from the books' storylines were considered, but a two-year hiatus to wait for new books was not an option for them (as the child actors continue to grow and the show's popularity would wane).

Shortly after the season 3 premiere in March 2013, the network renewed Game of Thrones for a fourth season, which would cover the second half of A Storm of Swords along with the beginnings of A Feast for Crows and A Dance With Dragons. Game of Thrones was nominated for 15 Emmy Awards for season 3. Two days after the fourth season premiered in April 2014, HBO renewed Game of Thrones for a fifth and sixth season. Season 5 premiered on April 12, 2015, and set a Guinness World Records for winning the highest number of Emmy Awards for a series in a single season and year, winning 12 out of 24 nominations, including Outstanding Drama Series. These episodes were watched by 8 million viewers, setting a record number for the series. On January 2, 2016, Martin confirmed that the sixth volume would not be published before the start of the sixth season of the HBO series. The sixth season premiered on April 24, 2016. These episodes received the most nominations for the 68th Primetime Emmy Awards with 23, winning 12, including the award for Outstanding Drama Series. The seventh season premiered on July 16, 2017. The eighth and final season premiered on April 14, 2019.

==== House of the Dragon (2022–present) ====
A spin-off prequel television series, House of the Dragon, was later developed based on sections of Martin's Fire & Blood — specifically the second half of the first volume, an expanded version of the novellas The Rogue Prince and The Princess and the Queen. House of the Dragon is created by George R. R. Martin and Ryan J. Condal for HBO. It is the second television series in the Game of Thrones franchise. The series is set two hundred years before the events of Game of Thrones and chronicles the events leading up to the Targaryen civil war, known as the "Dance of the Dragons", and the war itself. House of the Dragon received a straight-to-series order in October 2019, with casting beginning in July 2020 and principal photography beginning in April 2021 in the United Kingdom.

The first season of the series premiered in 2022 and consists of ten episodes, adapting "Heirs of the Dragon – A Question of Succession" from Fire & Blood, which focuses on the succession crisis following the deaths of Jaehaerys' sons and the eventual reign of his grandson Viserys I. The novella The Rogue Prince, previously published in the anthology Rogues in 2014, uses the majority of this text.

Subsequent seasons adapt "The Dying of the Dragons" from Fire & Blood, which focuses on the Dance of the Dragons, the succession war between Rhaenyra Targaryen and her younger half-brother Aegon II, and forms the primary basis of House of the Dragon. An abridged version was included in the novella The Princess and the Queen, which was published in the anthology Dangerous Women in 2013. The second season premiered in 2024 and consists of eight episodes. A third season premiered in 2026.

==== A Knight of the Seven Kingdoms (2026–present) ====
Another spin-off prequel series, A Knight of the Seven Kingdoms, was developed based on Martin's Tales of Dunk and Egg novellas. A Knight of the Seven Kingdoms is created by George R. R. Martin and Ira Parker for HBO. It is the third television series in the Game of Thrones franchise. It follows the adventures of "Dunk" (Ser Duncan the Tall, a hedge knight) and "Egg" (Prince Aegon Targaryen, the future King Aegon V), some 90 years before the events of the novels. It stars Peter Claffey as Dunk and Dexter Sol Ansell as Egg. The first season of the series premiered in 2026 and consists of six episodes, adapting the first novella, The Hedge Knight.

=== Feature film ===
==== Game of Thrones: Aegon's Conquest ====
On April 14, 2026, Warner Bros. announced at CinemaCon in Las Vegas that a feature film about Aegon's Conquest is in the works, based on the first chapters of Martin's Fire & Blood. The film is set to be written by Beau Willimon and is expected to be released in 2027 or later. The working title Game of Thrones: Aegon's Conquest was also confirmed.

=== Other works ===
A Song of Ice and Fire has spawned an industry of spin-off products. Fantasy Flight Games released a collectible card game, a board game, and two collections of artwork inspired by A Song of Ice and Fire series. Various roleplaying game products were released by Guardians of Order and Green Ronin. Dynamite Entertainment adapted A Game of Thrones into a same-titled monthly comic in 2011. Video games A Game of Thrones: Genesis, Game of Thrones, Game of Thrones: A Telltale Games Series, and A Game of Thrones: The Board Game - Digital Edition were released in 2011, 2012, 2014–2015, and 2020, respectively. The companion book The World of Ice & Fire by Martin and the Westeros.org owners Elio M. García Jr. and Linda Antonsson was published in October 2014. Other licensed products include full-sized weapon reproductions, a range of collectable figures, and a large number of gift and collectible items based on the television series. The popularity of the television series has made its version of the Iron Throne an icon of the entire media franchise. A stage play called Game of Thrones: The Mad King which will be a prequel to the series will premiere at the Royal Shakespeare Company in summer 2026.

== See also ==
- Outline of A Song of Ice and Fire franchise
