= Elio M. García Jr. and Linda Antonsson =

Authors

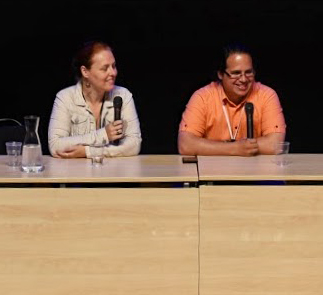
Linda Antonsson and Elio García at Archipelacon on June 28, 2015.

Elio Miguel García Jr. (born May 6, 1978) and Linda Maria Antonsson (born November 18, 1974) are authors who have contributed to the A Song of Ice and Fire series by George R. R. Martin, co-writing the companion books The World of Ice & Fire (2014) and The Rise of the Dragon (2022). They are also the founders of the fansite Westeros.org, one of the earliest fan websites for A Song of Ice and Fire.

== Career ==
Elio García was attending the University of Miami, while his partner Linda Antonsson was living in Sweden. At that time, in 1996, Antonsson introduced García to the A Song of Ice and Fire book series when it came out on paperback. After the second book, A Clash of Kings, was released, they decided to create a forum for discussion of the series, creating an early iteration of Westeros.org, and later expanded it as the series became more popular. As of 2016, Westeros.org had more than 100,000 registered members.

García and Antonsson have communicated closely with George R. R. Martin, serving sometimes as fact checkers and researchers of the A Song of Ice and Fire universe. They first approached Martin when they had the desire to create a game based on the series, seeking his permission, and created Westeros.org as an information source about how to play the game, titled "Blood of Dragons", but it transformed to become more encompassing of the entire series as a whole, with discussion forums, news, and a Wiki.

Around 2000, when A Storm of Swords was published, García and Antonsson began compiling a concordance of facts and details about Westeros, which they sent to Martin, leading him to state that they knew more about Westeros than he did. During the writing of the series' fourth book, A Feast for Crows, the couple became a regular fact checker for details regarding the series' many characters and locations.

After meeting with Martin in person in Santa Fe, New Mexico, the pair was approached by Martin to co-author a book titled The World of Ice & Fire, a companion book which focuses primarily on the history of the Targaryen family, one of the main families presented in the books. The book is written from the point of view that it is a scholarly work of a maester at the Citadel, the main center of knowledge in the world of Westeros. They work together from their home in Nödinge-Nol, near Gothenburg, Sweden.

Antonsson has stated that they never contribute to the main series of books on a story level, rather about setting details and continuity details. In addition to writing, Antonsson has also done English to Swedish translating, including for Game of Thrones.

The pair provided episode recaps, analysis and video commentary for each episode of Game of Thrones on westeros.org, but as the television series surpassed the book series, they have become critics of many of the show's plot conveniences, in their view, and "clichés"; following the 6th season of the program, García announced that he would no longer be watching the show, after which Antonsson began doing the episode reviews and commentary alone.

== Personal life ==
García and Antonsson met in 1995 while playing a game based on The Lord of the Rings over the internet. They were married in 2014, the same day that The World of Ice & Fire was released, 16 years after the couple had become engaged. García moved to Sweden in 1999; as of 2014, the couple lived in Sweden in Nödinge, Ale Municipality.
