= Fire & Blood (novel) =

2018 book by George R. R. Martin

- First edition cover
- Author: George R. R. Martin
- Illustrator: Doug Wheatley
- Language: English
- Series: A Song of Ice and Fire
- Genre: Fantasy
- Publisher: Bantam Books
- Publication date: November 20, 2018
- Publication place: United States
- Pages: 736
- ISBN: 978-1-524-79628-0
- Preceded by: The Sons of the Dragon (The Book of Swords); The Rogue Prince (Rogues); The Princess and the Queen (Dangerous Women)

Fire & Blood is a fantasy book by American writer George R. R. Martin, with illustrations by Doug Wheatley. It tells the history of House Targaryen, the dynasty that ruled the Seven Kingdoms of Westeros for nearly three centuries in the backstory of his A Song of Ice and Fire series. Although originally planned for publication after the completion of the series, Martin revealed his intent to publish the history in two volumes as the material had grown too large. The first volume was released on November 20, 2018. He plans to write the second volume, titled Blood & Fire, after completing The Winds of Winter, the sixth book of the A Song of Ice and Fire series.

The second half of the first volume (an expanded version of The Rogue Prince and The Princess and the Queen) has been adapted into the HBO series House of the Dragon, a prequel to Game of Thrones. Additionally, the first chapters are set to be adapted into a feature film titled Game of Thrones: Aegon's Conquest, expected to be released in 2027 or later.

== Publication history ==
In 2014, more than 200,000 words were removed from the manuscript of Martin's companion book The World of Ice & Fire and were incorporated into Fire & Blood. In February 2018, Elio M. García Jr., Martin's co-author for The World of Ice & Fire, reported that he had spoken with Martin at the 75th World Science Fiction Convention—held in August 2017 in Helsinki—about the first volume of Fire & Blood. According to García, in addition to the never-published material developed for The World of Ice & Fire, Martin also wrote entirely new material for the book, having "worked on just fleshing out a bit" the long reign of King Jaehaerys I Targaryen, which was previously only mentioned in "Heirs of the Dragon", an unpublished text that Martin abridged to form the novelette "The Rogue Prince". On July 22, 2017, Martin stated on his blog that the material for Fire & Blood had grown so large that the decision had been made to publish the histories of the Targaryen kings in two volumes. The first volume, titled Fire & Blood, covers the history of Westeros from Aegon's Conquest up to and through the regency of the boy king Aegon III Targaryen. The book was released on November 20, 2018.

== Contents ==
Rather than a novel, Fire & Blood takes the form of a scholarly treatise about the Targaryen dynasty written by a historian within the world of A Song of Ice and Fire, Archmaester Gyldayn. Gyldayn cites a variety of fictional primary sources for the historical events he describes, whose accounts sometimes conflict with each other, reflecting medieval methods of historiography and thus making Gyldayn an unreliable narrator from the reader's perspective.

- "Aegon's Conquest" describes Aegon I's conquest of the Seven Kingdoms of Westeros. More or less the same version was published in The World of Ice & Fire.
- "Reign of the Dragon – The Wars of King Aegon I" and "Three Heads Had the Dragon – Governance Under King Aegon I" follow Aegon I's reign after his Conquest. While his reign is briefly glossed over in The World of Ice & Fire, no parts of the chapters have been published before.
- "The Sons of the Dragon" focuses on the lives of Aegon I's sons, Aenys I and Maegor I, ending with Maegor's death and the ascension of Aenys's son Jaehaerys I Targaryen to the throne. An abridged novella of the same name was previously released in October 2017 in the anthology The Book of Swords.
- The long reign of Jaehaerys I is described over seven chapters.
- "Heirs of the Dragon – A Question of Succession" focuses on the succession crisis following the deaths of Jaehaerys' sons and the eventual reign of his grandson Viserys I. The novella The Rogue Prince, previously published in the anthology Rogues in 2014, uses the majority of this text, which was adapted in the first season of HBO's House of the Dragon.
- "The Dying of the Dragons" is split into six chapters and focuses on the Dance of the Dragons, the succession war between Rhaenyra Targaryen and her younger half-brother Aegon II. An abridged version was included in The Princess and the Queen, which was published in the anthology Dangerous Women in 2013. These chapters form the primary basis of House of the Dragon.
- "Aftermath – The Hour of the Wolf" describes the aftermath of the Dance and the ascension of Rhaenyra's young son Aegon III to the throne, while the book's four final chapters cover the early period of Aegon III's reign, when the realm was ruled by his regents.

Fire & Blood is illustrated in a similar fashion to A Knight of the Seven Kingdoms. The book contains more than seventy-five black and white illustrations by Doug Wheatley.

== Reception ==
Hugo Rifkind of The Times described it as "interminable, self-indulgent crap." Roisin O'Connor of The Independent faulted the book for its dry tone and stated that reading it feels like "you've been assigned a mildly interesting, but often tedious, piece of homework". Publishers Weekly stated that "Martin's evocative storytelling style and gift for gripping narrative are mostly absent from this dry history".

Conversely, Dan Jones of The Sunday Times praised the book, calling it "a masterpiece of popular historical fiction". Similarly, Chris Lough of Tor.com described the book as "... the best Song of Ice and Fire book in 18 years", a comparison to A Storm of Swords.

== Adaptations ==
The HBO series House of the Dragon, a prequel to Game of Thrones, is based on material from Fire & Blood, which covers the Dance of Dragons civil war. The show is produced by Martin, Vince Gerardis, Ryan Condal, and Miguel Sapochnik (also showrunner).

On April 14, 2026, Warner Bros. announced a film under the working title Game of Thrones: Aegon's Conquest at CinemaCon in Las Vegas. The film is set to be written by Beau Willimon and is expected to be released in 2027 or later.
