= A Game of Thrones (role-playing game) =

2005 tabletop role-playing game

- Core book
- Designers: Jesse Scoble, Elissa Carey, Jonathan Cassie, Simone Cooper, Chris Desmarais, Jason Durall, Debbie Gallagher, Sam Johnson, David Lyons, Ian Sturrock, Wil Upchurch, Jeremy "Bolthy" Zimmerman, and Elio M. Garcia Jr. & Linda Antonsson
- Publishers: Guardians of Order
- Publication: 2005
- Genres: fantasy
- Systems: Tri-Stat dX, d20

A Game of Thrones is a role-playing game produced by Guardians of Order based on the A Song of Ice and Fire fantasy series by George R. R. Martin.

== Description ==
The game is designed to be usable with two RPG systems: the d20 System and the Tri-Stat dX system. Two editions were made: a serial-numbered edition limited to 2500 copies, ISBN 1-58846-941-7; and a standard edition, ISBN 1-58846-942-5. The limited edition is faux-leather bound with silver gilt pages and includes rules for both systems, and includes an interview with Martin. The standard edition contains only the d20 system rules. The book was created by Guardians of Order and released by Sword & Sorcery, a subsidiary of White Wolf Games.

== Reception ==
The A Game of Thrones RPG (AGOT RPG) was nominated for several ENnie Awards and won 2006 awards for: Best Production (Silver), Best Game (Silver), and Best d20/OGL Product (Silver).

== History ==
On 28 July 2006, Martin announced that he had received word from the head of Guardians of Order that the company was folding and that no further releases for the setting would take place. Martin expressed hope that the game may be salvaged by another company, though he also said that he was experiencing difficulty in trying to recover his intellectual property rights.

On 7 March 2007 Martin wrote that he had regained control of his intellectual property rights and was "all square" with Guardians of Order. As part of their settlement, Mr. Martin received all remaining stock of the limited-edition version of the RPG. No further information regarding the settlement was revealed, nor the status of other creditors' claims on the property.

On 24 April 2007, it was on Martin's website that Green Ronin was producing a new line of A Song of Ice and Fire RPG products, unrelated to the earlier Guardians of Order effort. The Green Ronin game, titled A Song of Ice and Fire Roleplaying (SIFRP), went on sale on 10 March 2009: it uses a custom game system and does not contain rules from either the d20 or Tri-Stat dX systems.

Issue 307 of Dragon magazine featured D20 content related to ASOIAF, including stats for Tyrion Lannister, Sandor Clegane and other prominent characters; adventure hooks; and a brother of the Night's Watch prestige class.

== See also ==
- A Game of Thrones (board game)
- A Game of Thrones (card game)
