= Game of Thrones (2012 video game) =

- Cover art of the North America release featuring the Iron Throne
- Developer: Cyanide
- Publishers: NA: Atlus USA; PAL: Focus Home Interactive
- Engine: Unreal Engine 3
- Platforms: Microsoft Windows, PlayStation 3, Xbox 360
- Release: NA: May 15, 2012; EU: June 8, 2012; AU: June 14, 2012
- Genre: Action role-playing
- Mode: Single-player

Game of Thrones is a 2012 action role-playing game developed by Cyanide and published by Atlus USA in North America and Focus Home Interactive in Europe and Australia. It is based on A Song of Ice and Fire by George R. R. Martin, although some elements from the television series were added later in development.

James Cosmo and Conleth Hill reprise their roles from the television series as Jeor Mormont and Varys, respectively. Author George R. R. Martin has a cameo appearance as Maester Martin in Castlewood.

== Plot summary ==
The game takes place concurrently with season 1 of Game of Thrones, and switches between two characters, Alester Sarwyck and Mors Westford. Alester, a knight, was the heir to Sarwyck, a lordly house under Lannister, but had fled to Essos 15 years before, being traumatized by an unspecified event at the end of Robert's Rebellion. During that time, he became a priest of R'hllor. He returns to Riverspring, his home, after hearing of his father's death. Mors Westford is one of the best rangers of the Night's Watch, and prior to that, he was one of the best knights serving House Lannister. Near the end of Robert's Rebellion, he refused a direct order to kill Elia Martell and her two infants, thereby putting his family's lives in danger. He sent his wife and daughter into hiding and was persuaded to join the Night's Watch to avoid execution. Mors is also a skinchanger, and has a dog which he can control at will.

Alester, at his father's funeral, learns that his younger brother Gawen was recently disinherited, and has gone missing following his father's death. Gawen is suspected of murdering his father with poison. Meanwhile, Alester's half-brother, Valarr Hill, a bastard and a knight of the queen's guard, is engaged to Alester's sister, Elyana, and is set to become Riverspring's next lord, which Alester is determined to stop. As the funeral ends, a riot occurs among starving peasants. Alester takes command of the city guard and uses either force or negotiation to end the riot. Alester then leaves for King's Landing to search for clues about Gawen's disappearance. While there, he is arrested by the City Watch at Valarr's instigation. Varys helps him escape and meet with Queen Cersei, who decides to hire him for secret missions, and to make him compete against Valarr. The two are sent to kill a bastard named Harry Waters, who is protected by Jon Arryn's knights, led by Godric Donnerly. With Godric dead, they learn that Arryn was protecting another woman and sent her to the Wall. Valarr sends his lieutenant Yohn to impersonate Godric and find this woman. Alester then encounters Lord Arwood Harlton, who offers to help find Gawen. They find a genealogical book which proves that the queen's children are illegitimate. Alester searches the sewers for Gawen but finds bandits sent by Janos Slynt. Alester infiltrates the City Watch and finds a Gawen's corpse, and a letter showing that Slynt was hired by Valarr. At this point, Harlton reveals that he is part of a conspiracy to reinstate the Targaryens, as was Alester's father. Alester joins and goes to Harlton's estate, Castlewood.

While all this happens, Mors Westford is tasked with hunting down Night's Watch deserters. On one chase, he takes three new recruits to the castle Icemark, but they are attacked by wildlings. Two men die, one man named Poddy deserts, and Mors survives only when rescued by Qhorin Halfhand. Mors pursues and kills Poddy. Returning to Castle Black, Mors receives a letter from Jon Arryn asking him to protect a girl named Jeyne Greystone. Arryn's knights, led by Godric, appear to help Mors locate her. They find her in Mole's Town but Jeyne insists that Godric is an impostor. Mors and others have several fights against the impostors, as well as members of the Night's Watch who were bribed. As Yohn, the false Godric, dies, he reveals he was sent by Valarr. Jeor Mormont is furious and wants to strike back. He makes Mors a recruiter for the Night's Watch to give him a cover to head south, so that Mors can hide Jeyne and to bring Valarr to justice. Weeks later, Mors and Jeyne arrive at a deserted cabin belonging to House Westford, where Jeyne reveals that she is a bastard daughter of Aerys II Targaryen, one of King Robert's mistresses, and pregnant with the king's child. Shortly after, Mors discovers his wife and daughter's graves. They are attacked by Valarr's men, but soldiers from Harlton counterattack and take Mors and Jeyne into custody.

Harlton reveals that, as a top advisor, he arranged Jeyne's relationship with the king to produce a half-Targaryen, half-Baratheon to be a puppet ruler. Mors is tortured in the dungeon, but one night, he uses his dog to free another prisoner, Gawen. Gawen meets with his brother Alester, who is staying upstairs, and reveals that Harlton murdered their father and faked Gawen's death. Alester liberates Mors, but Gawen is killed. It is revealed that Mors and Alester are old friends, who fought together in Robert's Rebellion. Alester and Mors are forced to flee Castlewood without Jeyne. At Riverspring, they find that Valarr is holding the entire town hostage, but they successfully break in, derailing Valarr's wedding. Mors duels Valarr, but is killed by Valarr's shadow magic. As he dies, Valarr reveals that he was behind the murder of Mors' family. The wedding guests proclaim the duel invalid because of the shadow magic, and try to support Alester, but Valarr reacts by massacring the town. Alester reveals Jeyne's location to Valarr in an attempt to save Elyana, but Valarr kills her regardless. Alester and his supporters organize a resistance while Valarr takes most of his men to Castlewood. Afterwards, Alester pays respects to Mors by performing the ritual of the Last Kiss, which unwittingly brings Mors back to life. As Valarr attacks Castlewood seeking to capture Jeyne, Alester and Mors sneak into the building, but find that Jeyne is in labor. Harlton is killed by Valarr's shadow-magic, while Jeyne allows Valarr to kill her, hoping that he will not realize that she has already given birth. Back in Riverspring, Alester and Mors learn that King Robert has died. A few days later, as Eddard Stark is being executed, they find and kill Valarr, having stolen a Valyrian sword to fight off Valarr's demons. Valarr, with his dying breath, reveals that he and Alester killed Mors' family together, acting on Tywin Lannister's orders. This is why Alester fled to Essos. Alester and Mors duel to the death. One of them survives and is confronted by Varys, who offers to send Jeyne's baby to Essos to be cared for. The game has four possible endings:

- Alester survives, sends the baby to Essos, and confronts the queen, whereupon he is dragged away for a quick execution.
- Alester survives, gives the baby to the queen, and inherits Riverspring, but is depressed and contemplates suicide.
- Mors survives, sends the baby to Essos, and returns to the wall, regularly executing deserters and becoming highly jaded.
- Mors survives and deserts the Night's Watch, hoping to raise the baby in Essos himself, as sworn brothers confront him at the Westford cabin.

== Development ==
=== Downloadable content ===
In November 2012 Cyanide published the downloadable content (DLC) "Beyond the Wall". It is set 10 years before the plot of Game of Thrones. It was released for PC platforms, PlayStation 3 and Xbox 360. Gorold, Mors, and a Sworn Brother named Weasel are forced to go beyond the Wall, after a Night's Watch builder, Maekar, is abducted by wildlings. Weasel betrays Gorold and Mors to a wildling chief named Bael. Bael forces Mors and Gorold to take part in his pit fights. Mors meets his dog here, who is also forced to fight.

After Mors and Gorold make an unpopular decision in the pits, a wildling, presumably angry at losing his wager, breaks into Mors' cage to assassinate him, but Mors' dog kills him. This enables Mors to find Gorold and escape the camp. However, Mors insists that they find Maekar first. Maekar is found to have had his arms and legs removed, and reveals that they were taken to provide meat to feed the pit fighters. He also tells Mors that he revealed the Wall's secrets and weaknesses to the Wildlings. Mors sends Gorold back to get reinforcements, and proceeds to massacre the entire Wildling encampment. When the Sworn Brothers return, one comments that it is "like a slaughterhouse," and Gorold, finding Mors, replies, "Aye... And there's the butcher," giving Mors his nickname.

== Reception ==
Reception

Aggregate score
Aggregator	Score		
Aggregator	PC	PS3	Xbox 360
Metacritic	58/100	53/100	52/100

Review scores
Publication	Score		
Publication	PC	PS3	Xbox 360
Edge	N/A	N/A	5/10
Electronic Gaming Monthly	N/A	N/A	6.5/10
Game Informer	N/A	6/10	6/10
GameSpot	N/A	7/10	7/10
GameTrailers	N/A	N/A	6/10
GameZone	4/10	4/10	4/10
Giant Bomb	N/A	N/A	2/5
IGN	N/A	4/10	4/10
Joystiq	N/A	N/A	2.5/5
Official Xbox Magazine (US)	N/A	N/A	7/10
PC Gamer (UK)	58%	N/A	N/A
PC PowerPlay	5/10	N/A	N/A
Polygon	N/A	N/A	5/10
PlayStation: The Official Magazine	N/A	4/10	N/A
Digital Spy	2/5	N/A	N/A
The Guardian	N/A	N/A	3/5

Game of Thrones received "mixed" reviews on all platforms according to the review aggregation website Metacritic. IGN praised the well-crafted plot, but criticized its poor execution through low-quality graphics, sound design, animations and voice acting, as well as a repetitive combat experience.

The Guardian gave the Xbox 360 version three stars out of five, criticizing the combat system but calling it "a decent game that has been horrifically let down by one sub-standard element." However, The Digital Fix gave the same console version a score of five out of ten and said, "By hook or by crook Cyanide managed to win this licence before it hit the big time with HBO, and it's difficult to believe that they would be given the opportunity to create Westeros now that it is so much more well known. A serviceable game with blood spurts and political machinations would have sufficed as a first step, allowing them time to bed in get to know the nuances of third person combat. Instead, apart from the story, there is a general feeling of detachment from the game and its main gameplay elements giving rise to the notion that most who play it will do so only to find out how the tales of Mors and Alester twist and turn on their way to conclusion." Digital Spy gave the PC version two stars out of five and said that it "takes a while to get going, but perseverance is rewarded with an engaging story full of tough choices and interesting dilemmas. Unfortunately, the plot is let down by poor storytelling, sloppy visuals and mediocre gameplay, despite a relatively deep combat system."
