= A Clash of Kings (comics) =

Comic book adaptation of book by George R. R. Martin

Publication information
- Publisher: Dynamite Entertainment
- Format: Complete
- Genre: Fantasy
- Publication date: June 7, 2017 – November 24, 2021
- No. of issues: 32

Creative team
- Written by: Landry Walker
- Artist(s): Mel Rubi
- Letterer(s): Marshall Dillion
- Colorist(s): Ivan Nunes

A Clash of Kings is the comic book adaptation of George R. R. Martin's fantasy novel A Clash of Kings, the second in the A Song of Ice and Fire. It is a sequel to the comic book adaptation of A Game of Thrones.

== Production ==
The comic book series is scripted by comic book writer Landry Walker and drawn by Mel Rubi, with covers by Rubi and by Mike S. Miller. It is intended to be a closer adaption of the novels. Following its first issue publication in 2017, at a rate of about a page of art for each page of text.

== Publication history ==
Sixteen issues of A Clash of Kings were released from June 7, 2017 until the series went on hiatus in March 2019. In January 2020, new releases continued marketed as A Clash of Kings Part II, with the last issue published on November 24, 2021. The thirty-two issues of the series were also published in four compilation volumes, each one containing eight issues. The volumes were published from October 17, 2018, to October 2, 2022.

Hardcover collections

Title	ISBN	Date of publication	Contains
A Clash of Kings: The Graphic Novel: Volume One	978-0-44-042324-9	October 17, 2018	A Clash of Kings #1–8 The Making of A Clash of Kings: The Graphic Novel: Volume One
A Clash of Kings: The Graphic Novel: Volume Two	978-0-44-042325-6	October 1, 2019	A Clash of Kings #9–16 The Making of A Clash of Kings: The Graphic Novel: Volume Two
A Clash of Kings: The Graphic Novel: Volume Three	978-0-440-42326-3	November 2, 2021	A Clash of Kings Part II #1–8 (#17-24) The Making of A Clash of Kings: The Graphic Novel: Volume Three
A Clash of Kings: The Graphic Novel: Volume Four	978-1-984-82078-5	October 2, 2022	A Clash of Kings Part II #9–16 (#25-32) The Making of A Clash of Kings: The Graphic Novel: Volume Four

== Reception ==
The series currently holds a score of 7.0 out of 10 on the review aggregator website Comic Book Roundup, based on 22 total reviews for the series' 31 published issues.
