= The Sons of the Dragon =

2017 novella by George R. R. Martin

- Author: George R. R. Martin
- Audio read by: Ralph Lister
- Language: English
- Series: A Song of Ice and Fire
- Genre: Fantasy
- Published in: The Book of Swords
- Publisher: Bantam Spectra
- Publication date: October 10, 2017
- Publication place: United States
- Preceded by: The Rogue Prince

The Sons of the Dragon is a novella by George R. R. Martin, set in the fictional land of Westeros, the setting of Martin's A Song of Ice and Fire series. The story commences about 270 years before the start of A Game of Thrones (1996). It centers on the death of Aegon I, known as "Aegon the Conqueror" for his bloody unification of the warring nations of Westeros, and his two sons: Aenys I, who succeeded him, and Maegor I, reviled as "Maegor the Cruel", in their respective successions to the throne thereafter, and the conflicts faced between them. The story concludes with the death of Maegor, and introduces the groundwork for its sequel, being about the life of his successor and nephew Jaehaerys I "the Conciliator", whose 55-year reign brought about an unprecedented age of peace to the Seven Kingdoms.

== Format ==
As with his previous Westerosi "histories", including The World of Ice and Fire, The Rogue Prince and The Princess and the Queen, Martin wrote The Sons of the Dragon from the perspective of a fictional Westerosi scholar-physician, referred to in-universe as a "maester". Unlike the previous works, attributed to Maester Yandel and Archmaester Gyldayn, the maester of The Sons of the Dragon remains anonymous throughout the story. At the conclusion of the novella, the unnamed maester notes that the following history of the Targaryen family, concerning the life of Jaehaerys I, would be a "task for another maester".

== Background ==
Following an early 2017 leak that revealed plans for the novella to be included in the anthology The Book of Swords (edited by Martin's longtime friend Gardner Dozois), Martin himself confirmed that the anthology was scheduled to be released on October 10, 2017, and confirmed that The Sons of the Dragon would be included.

The story was derived from previously written lengthier material that Martin had prepared for the companion book The World of Ice & Fire, but was removed because the book was becoming too long for the original concept of a fully illustrated book. It and several other stories appeared in abridged versions in other anthologies.

The story is included in full in Fire & Blood.

== Publication ==
The novella was released by Bantam Spectra in October 2017 in hardcover, paperback and audiobook formats, all as the final story in The Book of Swords anthology. The audiobook edition was narrated by Ralph Lister, who previously collaborated with Martin and Dozois as narrator for their 2012 anthology Down These Strange Streets.
