= The World of Ice & Fire =

2014 book by George R. R. Martin

- First edition cover
- Author: George R. R. Martin; Elio M. García Jr.; Linda Antonsson
- Illustrator: Michael Komarck; Ted Nasmith; Marc Simonetti; et cetera
- Language: English
- Series: A Song of Ice and Fire
- Genre: Fantasy
- Published: October 28, 2014
- Publisher: Bantam
- Publication place: United States
- Media type: Print (Hardback)
- Pages: 326
- ISBN: 978-0-553-80544-4

The World of Ice & Fire: The Untold History of Westeros and the Game of Thrones is a companion book for George R. R. Martin's A Song of Ice and Fire fantasy series. Written by Martin, Elio M. García Jr. and Linda Antonsson, it was published by Bantam on October 28, 2014. The 326-page volume is a fully illustrated "history compendium" of Martin's fictional world, written from the perspective of an in-world "Maester" and featuring newly written material, family trees, and extensive maps and artwork.

== Contents ==
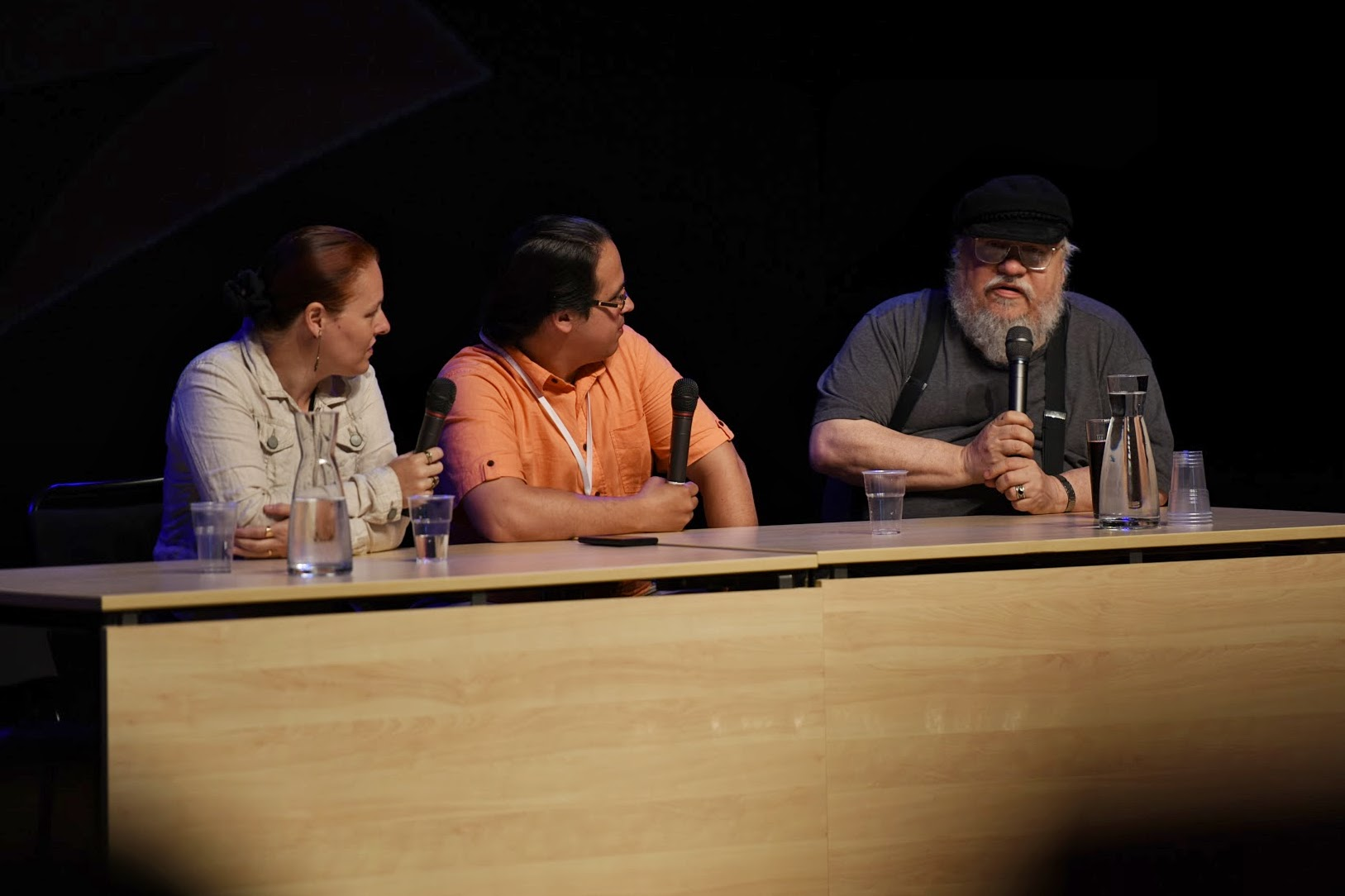
Linda Antonsson, Elio Garcia and George R.R. Martin in a 2015 panel at Archipelacon, Mariehamn

The format of The World of Ice & Fire is intentionally a replication of a "real history book" in which sources can contradict each other. Martin worked closely with the artists to render the characters and locales as he himself imagined them, as opposed to how they may be portrayed in HBO's Game of Thrones series and other media, such as comic books and games.

The book details the fictional history of the Seven Kingdoms, from the pre-historic Dawn Age up to just before the main book series.

=== Art ===
Martin teased the book in July 2013 with a blog post praising Marc Simonetti's drawing of the Iron Throne, which was to appear in the book, as very close to his own idea of the throne, compared to the TV series version. Upon the 2014 release of The World of Ice & Fire, he called its representation of the throne by Simonetti "absolutely right." Martin said he had wanted the book to be a fully illustrated volume with art from "the top fantasy illustrators in the world."

The World of Ice & Fire features the work of 27 illustrators: Rene Aigner, Ryan Barger, Arthur Bozonnet, José Daniel Cabrera Peña, Jennifer Sol Cai, Thomas Denmark, Jennifer Drummond, Jordi González Escamilla, Michael Gellatly, Tomasz Jedruszek, Michael Komarck, John McCambridge, Mogri, Ted Nasmith, Karla Ortiz, Rahedie Yudha Pradito, Dhian Prasetya, Paolo Puggioni, Jonathan Roberts, Thomas Siagian, Marc Simonetti, Chase Stone, Philip Straub, Justin Sweet, Nutchapol Thitinunthakorn, Magali Villeneuve, and Douglas Wheatley.

== Development ==
Elio García and Linda Antonsson head the A Song of Ice and Fire fansite Westeros.org. George R. R. Martin enlisted them in 2006 to assist with the project, which at the time he believed would be finished by 2008. García is a Martin "superfan" whom the author and HBO have consulted on details previously established by Martin in the series.

The book's planned length was 500,000 words, but the historical references collected by García and Antonsson from the books amounted to 70,000 words, and after Martin "polished it, expanded it and fill [sic] in the holes," it became 1,000,000 words. Martin also started writing "sidebar" stories for the book, but at one point, he realized he had written 3,500,000 more words. As this did not fit the original concept of a fully illustrated book—the number of illustrations remaining the same—Martin removed his sidebar stories, and the rest was abridged by García and Antonsson. Parts of the removed material appeared in Gardner Dozois's anthologies Dangerous Women (as The Princess and the Queen), Rogues (as The Rogue Prince) and The Book of Swords (as The Sons of the Dragon).

Addressing comparisons of The World of Ice & Fire to J. R. R. Tolkien's The Silmarillion, Martin clarified that while his book provides a basic overview of the many areas of his fictional world and their histories, he planned to someday publish a more extensive volume focusing primarily on the Targaryens, which he jokingly dubbed "The GRRMarillion." As plans for an eventual second companion book became more solidified, Martin said that it would more formally be titled Fire & Blood, because it gives expanded detail on the reign of each Targaryen king.
