= A Game of Thrones: Genesis =

2011 video game

- Developer: Cyanide
- Publisher: Focus Home Interactive
- Platform: Windows
- Release: September 29, 2011
- Genre: Strategy
- Mode: Single-player

A Game of Thrones: Genesis is a 2011 strategy game developed by Amusement Cyanide and published by Focus Home Interactive for Windows. The game is an adaptation of the series of fantasy novels A Song of Ice and Fire by George R. R. Martin and is the first video game adaptation of the novels. The game takes place over 1,000 years of the fictional history of Westeros, beginning with the arrival of the Rhoynar led by the warrior-queen Nymeria.

== Gameplay ==
Gameplay focuses on capturing nodes—castles, towns and goldmines—with characters. Emphasis is placed on the rock-paper-scissors mechanics of "underhanded" characters rather than the brute force combat strength of traditional realtime strategy games.

The goal of the game is to win the Iron Throne and doing so can be done by amassing enough 'prestige' within the game.

Each house has special units and abilities. House Stark has direwolves and House Baratheon has better archers, for example.

The game has two modes of play: Versus and Campaign. The game features four main facets: diplomacy, military, economic, and underhand.

== Reception ==
Reception

Aggregate score
Aggregator	Score
Metacritic	53/100

Review scores
Publication	Score
Destructoid	4.5/10
Eurogamer	5/10
Game Informer	6.75/10
GamePro	2.5/5
GamesMaster	59%
GameSpot	5/10
GameSpy	2/5
GameTrailers	4.9/10
IGN	6/10
Joystiq	2.5/5
PC Gamer (UK)	62%
PC PowerPlay	3/10
Digital Spy	2/5
The Escapist	2.5/5

A Game of Thrones: Genesis received "mixed or average" reviews, according to the review aggregation website Metacritic.
