= A Game of Thrones (comics) =

2011–2014 comic book series

- Cover of the first issue of A Game of Thrones

Publication information
- Publisher: Dynamite Entertainment
- Format: Complete
- Genre: Fantasy
- Publication date: 21 September 2011 – 30 July 2014
- No. of issues: 24

Creative team
- Written by: Daniel Abraham
- Artist: Tommy Patterson
- Letterer: Marshall Dillion
- Colorist: Ivan Nunes

A Game of Thrones is the comic book adaptation of George R. R. Martin's fantasy novel A Game of Thrones, the first in the A Song of Ice and Fire series. A sequel, A Clash of Kings, was announced in March 2017, based on the book of the same name.

== Production ==
The comic book series was scripted by fantasy author Daniel Abraham and drawn by Tommy Patterson. It is intended to follow the story and atmosphere of the novel closely, at a rate of about a page of art for each page of text, and was projected to cover 24 issues of 29 pages each. George R.R. Martin advised Daniel Abraham on aspects of the adaptation.

In an Ignite presentation of the series' development process, Abraham said that the major challenges in creating the adaptation were:

- How to convey the novel's substantial amount of exposition and dialogue in a manner appropriate to the medium
- How to represent the novel's sex scenes involving 13-year-old Daenerys Targaryen in such a manner as not to risk being accused of child pornography under the U.S. PROTECT Act
- Producing the series in parallel to HBO's TV series, which visualizes the novel and its characters in a different manner
- Not knowing what might become significant in the as-yet unwritten sixth and seventh novels in the Song of Ice and Fire series.

For the second novel in the series, Landry Walker took over as writer, while the art was provided by Mel Rubi.

== Publication history ==
The initial issue was published by Dynamite Entertainment in September 2011. New issues are published at a rate of one per month.

The first six issues were published as a trade paperback, marketed as a graphic novel, on 27 March 2012. It took first place on the New York Times best-seller list for graphic books the day after its publication.

Hardcover collections

Title	ISBN	Date of publication	Contains
A Game of Thrones: The Graphic Novel: Volume One	978-0-440-42321-8	March 27, 2012	A Game of Thrones #1–6; The Making of A Game of Thrones: The Graphic Novel: Volume One
A Game of Thrones: The Graphic Novel: Volume Two	978-0-007-49304-3	June 11, 2013	A Game of Thrones #7–12 The Making of A Game of Thrones: The Graphic Novel: Volume Two
A Game of Thrones: The Graphic Novel: Volume Three	978-0-440-42323-2	March 11, 2014	A Game of Thrones #13-18 The Making of A Game of Thrones: The Graphic Novel: Volume Three
A Game of Thrones: The Graphic Novel: Volume Four	978-0-345-52919-0	May 5, 2015	A Game of Thrones #19-24 The Making of A Game of Thrones: The Graphic Novel: Volume Four

== Reception ==
The series currently holds a score of 6.4 out of 10 on the review aggregator website Comic Book Roundup, based on 26 total reviews for the series' 24 published issues. The highest-rated issue was #4, with a score of 9.6 derived from one review, while the lowest is issue #23, with a score of 2.0, also based on one review.

Initial reviews of the adaptation were mixed. IGN rated the first issue as "passable", acknowledging the writing and art as competent, but considered the character design to be "overly pretty and slightly exaggerated" and the series as a whole to lack added value with respect to either the original novel or the HBO series. Weekly Comic Book Review gave the first issue a "B−", appreciating Patterson's art but finding the colors to be inappropriately bright and shiny. Broken Frontier reviewed the "enjoyable adaption" favorably, but asked for "a tighter focus on characters over plot points, and a more serious take on the art". While they appreciated Patterson's settings, they considered that his art dipped in quality when it came to facial expressions, making characters appear distracting and misshapen.

Comic bloggers Geek of Doom praised the comic, concluding that it communicated the book's depth better than the TV series did. The Courier News's reviewer, on the other hand, dismissed the adaptation as presenting "a world filled with fantasy cliches, void of style and indistinguishable from any other mediocre book dubiously depicting the middle ages".
