= A Song of Ice and Fire fandom =

Informal community for A Song of Ice and Fire, and Game of Thrones

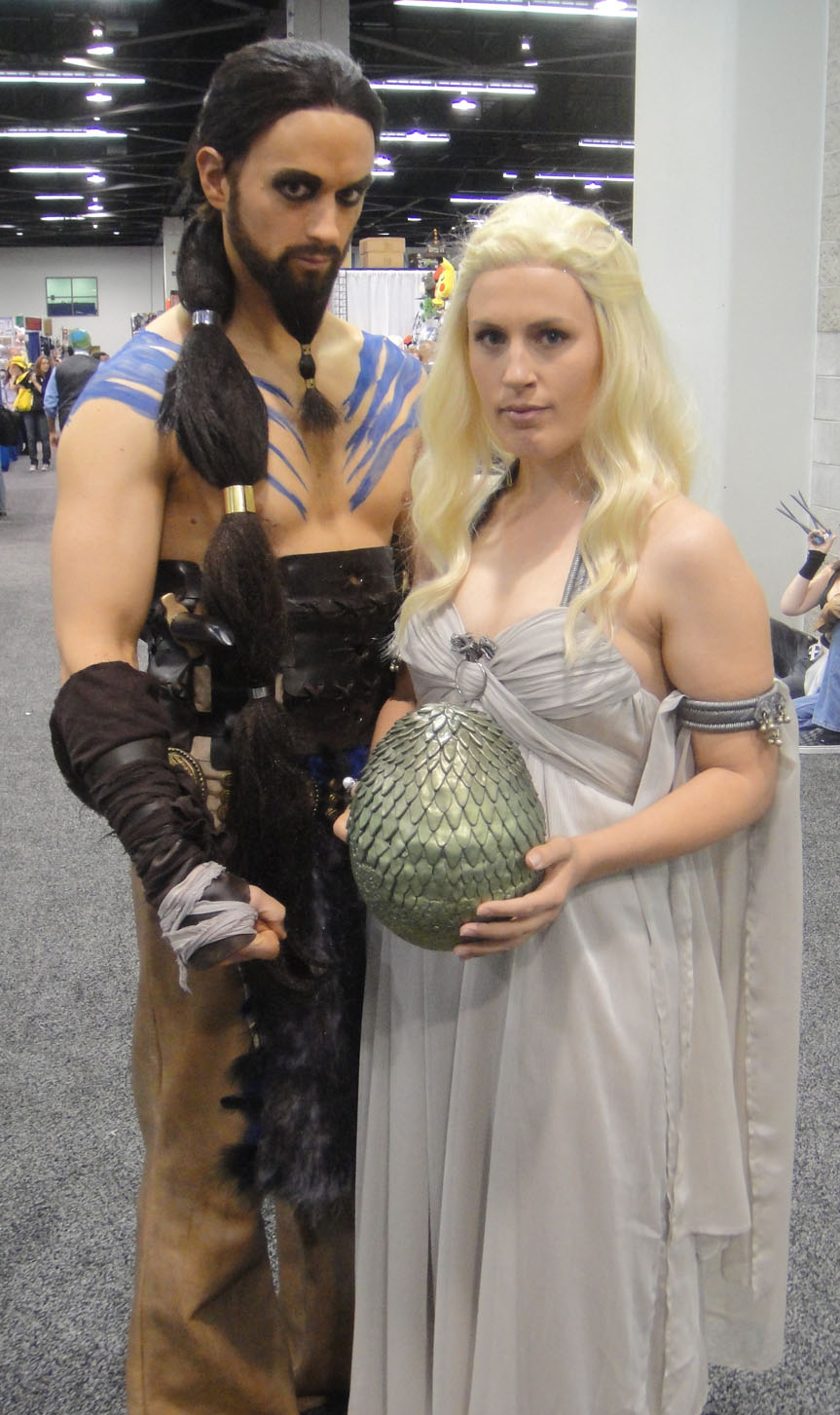
Two fans costumed as Khal Drogo and Daenerys Targaryen. Cosplay is a popular activity at fan conventions.

The A Song of Ice and Fire fandom is an international and informal community of people drawn together by George R. R. Martin's A Song of Ice and Fire book series, the HBO television series Game of Thrones, and the related merchandise.

== History ==
During his years in television, Martin's novels slowly earned him a reputation in fiction circles, although he said to only receive a few fans letters a year in the pre-internet days. The publication of A Game of Thrones caused Martin's following to grow, with fan sites springing up and a Trekkie-like society of followers evolving that meet regularly. By 2005, Martin received tons of fan e-mails and was about 2000 letters behind that may go unanswered for years.

== Ice and Fire Con ==
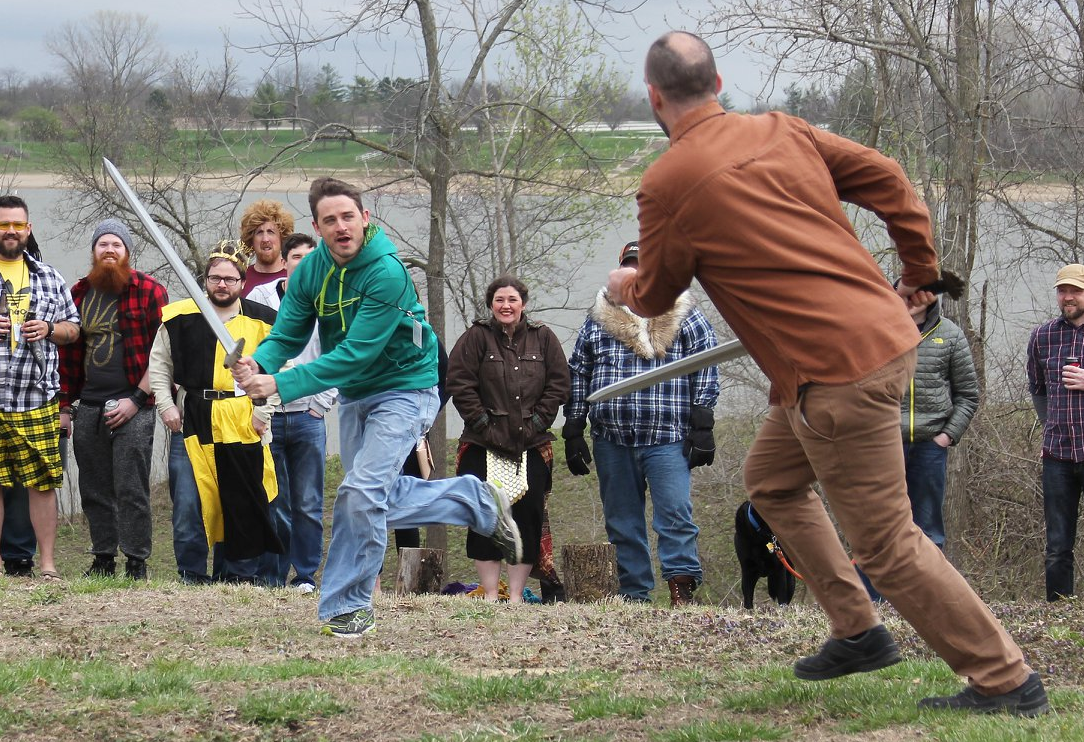
Tournament Melee at Ice and Fire Con 2018.

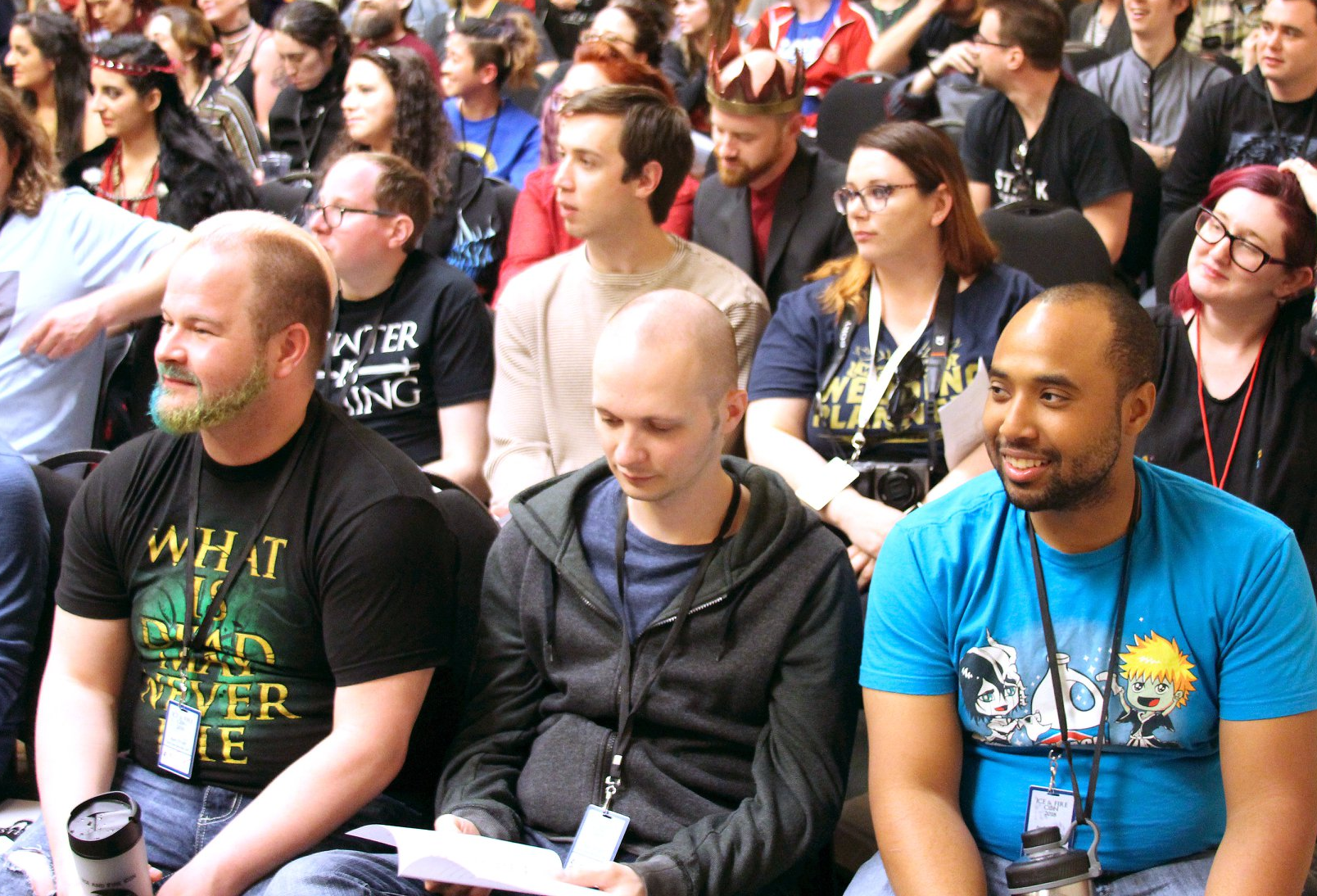
Discussion Panel at Ice and Fire Con 2018.

Ice and Fire Con (also known as A Con of Ice and Fire and A Convention of Ice and Fire) is a North American convention held annually in Mount Sterling, Ohio that celebrates George R. R. Martin's A Song of Ice and Fire fantasy book series, as well as HBO's Game of Thrones television adaptation.

=== Programming and traditions ===
The convention's programming has included a Tourney of Champions since 2013, featuring "LARP"-based duels, melees, jousts, and archery contests. Other annual activities include a weekend-long live action Assassin-style game themed after the series' Faceless Men characters, a board game tournament, and a "Flea Bottom Fete" dance party, among others. A mock election has been held each year since 2013 allowing attendees to campaign for and vote for characters from A Song of Ice and Fire. A donation-based voting format was incorporated beginning in 2017, with all proceeds going to Santa Fe's Wild Spirit Wolf Sanctuary, a favorite charity of Martin.

=== Awards and honors ===
In 2016, FanSided named Ice and Fire Con as one of the top ten nerdiest vacation destinations.

In 2017, NowThis News praised Ice and Fire Con in its "Game of Thrones - A Community of Ice and Fire" coverage for the event's "more intimate gathering that's more party than press conference", favorably comparing the Ice and Fire Con to the fan conventions Martin himself attended in the 1970s and 1980s as a fan and built the friendships that served him throughout his career.

== Westeros.org ==
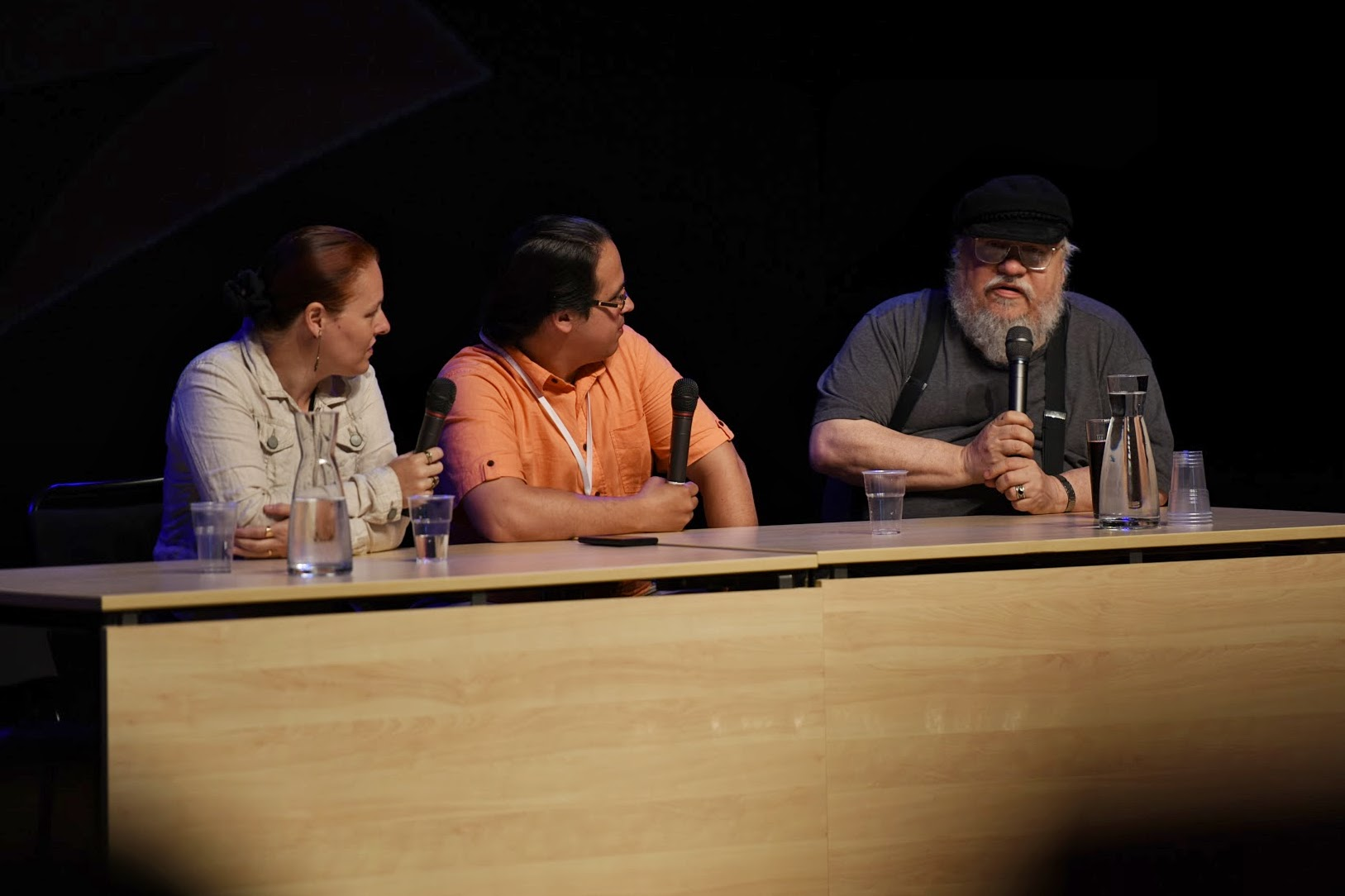
Linda Antonsson, Elio M. García and George R.R. Martin in 2015.

Sweden-based fans Elio M. García Jr. and Linda Antonsson run one of the main Ice and Fire fansites, Westeros.org, which they established in 1999. The site had about 17 thousand registered members in 2012. Martin himself has checked with García (whom The New Yorker dubbed a "superfan" with encyclopedic knowledge of Martin's works) to confirm details of his own series, and has referred HBO researchers to García as well.

The very first fan website and messageboard (as recounted by García, Antonsson, and Martin) was a site called "Dragonstone", which only lasted for about one year between the release of the first novel in 1996, and the site crashed in 1997, never to be rebuilt. The creator of "Dragonstone" moved on; however, several of the earliest online fans who had met on the site (Elio García among them) coalesced again to create Westeros.org.

Though his work at Westeros.org is voluntary, García has been a paid consultant for licensed tie-in merchandise. García and Antonsson are Martin's coauthors of a companion book to the series, The World of Ice & Fire (2014). Martin had approached the pair about the project in 2008.

== Brotherhood Without Banners ==
The Brotherhood Without Banners is an unofficial fan club with members in several countries. George R. R. Martin has attended gatherings of the group during his travels and has maintained friendships with some of its founders and longtime members.

== Game of Thrones ==
Since the creation of the television series in 2011 there has been a proliferation in the number of fansites dedicated to the show and novel series. These include 'ToweroftheHand.com', which organizes communal readings of the novels, and 'Fleabottom.net', an online discussion forum. In addition to these there is further discussion on more general sites, such as Reddit, and tumblr, where there are many fan-created blogs. Race for the Iron Throne was a blog by policy historian and author Steven Attewell that did chapter-by-chapter analysis of A Song of Ice and Fire and episode-by-episode analysis of Game of Thrones.

Moreover, there are also many podcasts covering the series. These podcasts, such as 'Game of Owns', and 'A Podcast of Ice and Fire' provide discussions of each book chapters, and each episode in the television series, as well as discussing the current theories in the fandom.

== GRRuMblers ==
"After all, as some of you like to point out in your emails, I am sixty years old and fat, and you don't want me to 'pull a Robert Jordan' on you and deny you your book. Okay, I've got the message. You don't want me doing anything except A Song of Ice and Fire. Ever. (Well, maybe it's okay if I take a leak once in a while?)

— George R. R. Martin on his blog in 2009

While Martin calls the majority of his fans "great", and enjoys interacting with them, some of them turned against him due to the six years it took to release A Dance with Dragons. A movement of disaffected fans called GRRuMblers formed in 2009, creating sites such as Finish the Book, George and Is Winter Coming?. It is not uncommon for Martin to be mobbed at book signings either. The New Yorker called this "an astonishing amount of effort to devote to denouncing the author of books one professes to love. Few contemporary authors can claim to have inspired such passion."

When fans' vocal impatience for A Dance with Dragons peaked in 2009, Martin issued an angry statement called "To My Detractors" on his blog to stem a rising tide of anger. Author Neil Gaiman backed Martin on his own blog, replying to a fan's inquiry about Martin's tardiness that "George R. R. Martin is not your bitch." Martin sees it a right to withdraw anytime and enjoy his leisure times as he chooses. Martin believes of himself as being bound by an informal contract with his readers; he feels that he owes them his best work. He does not, however, believe that this gives them the right to dictate the particulars of his creative process or to complain about how he manages his time. As far as the detractors are concerned, Martin's contract with them was for a story, their engagement with it offered on the understanding that he would provide them with a satisfying conclusion.

== The Winds of Winter delays ==
As the years have gone on without a new book release, ASOIAF fans have grown increasingly upset with Martin, many giving up hope he'll ever finish the books, as now there's been more time since the last book as there was between the first and 5th book. Martin posted a "bitter" and "resentful" rant complaining about his fanbase's reactions to delays in his writing, and over their fears he will pass before finishing the series, but continues to claim he will finish them. Some fans have attempted to calculate when the next books will come out, with one estimate in 2022 suggesting The Winds of winter will be released in late 2027 and the final book in 2042 when Martin would be 95 years old, casting doubt on the completion of the series.

== Interaction with the author ==
Martin is committed to nurturing his audience, no matter how vast it gets. Starting out as a fan himself, he visited his first convention in 1971 after selling his first story. Since there are different types of conventions nowadays, Martin tends to go to three or four science-fiction conventions a year simply to go back to his roots and meet friends, such as the Brotherhood Without Banners. His fan mail occasionally includes photos of children and pets named after his characters, which Martin displays on his website. He also administers a lively blog with the assistance of Ty Franck.

Martin does not read message boards anymore, so as not influence his writing by fans foreseeing twists and interpreting characters differently from how he intended.

== Celebrity fans ==
The series has a devoted global following of people from a range of backgrounds.

Celebrity fans include former U.S. president Barack Obama, former UK prime minister David Cameron, former Australian prime minister Julia Gillard and Dutch foreign minister Frans Timmermans, who framed European politics in quotes from Martin's novels in a 2013 speech. Other fans includes singer Zara Larsson, Adam Lambert, and Scott Ian from the metal band Anthrax, with the later one having read books, stated that he likes the show better, saying that it's very rarely that a TV show or a movie is better than the source material.

Other celebrity fans include actors Laurence Fishburne, Richard Dreyfuss, June Squibb, Amanda Peet, Zach Braff, Patton Oswalt, Elijah Wood, Mindy Kaling, Dax Shepard, Kristen Bell, Elizabeth Banks, Anna Kendrick, Kerry Washington, Dylan McDermott and Jennifer Lawrence. Singers T-Pain, Kelly Clarkson, Snoop Dogg, Ed Sheeran, Madonna, Illslick, and Joe Jonas (who was married to Sophie Turner, who played Sansa Stark on the show), and comedians Kevin Smith, Seth Rogen, Aziz Ansari. Ryan Reynolds and his wife Blake Lively are also both fans of the show.

Author Stephen King is also a fan of the series. Jay-Z and Beyoncé are both fans of the show, while Jay-Z once bought dragon eggs for his wife Beyoncé. In 2017, the Duke and Duchess of Cambridge also said that they watch the show.

== Online media ==
=== Podcasts ===
Several podcasts are dedicated to the A Song of Ice and Fire books and Game of Thrones HBO series, including: After the Thrones, Thronecast, Game of Owns, Podcast of Ice and Fire,Mythical Astronomy of Ice & Fire, A Storm of Spoilers, and Radio Westeros. Several of these podcasts also cross-post to YouTube.

=== YouTube channels ===
Several YouTube channels are dedicated to the franchise as well, including Alt Shift X, Emergency Awesome, Red Team Review and Preston Jacobs (two separate channels that frequently cross over), and Game of Thrones Academy.

In 2019, in anticipation of the eighth and final TV season, several YouTube channels collaborated to make an anthology of essays about the show: The Thrones Effect: How HBO's Game of Thrones Conquered Pop Culture. The book was edited by Gil Kidron of Game of Thrones Academy, and included essays from other prominent YouTube fan channels such as History of Westeros, Ideas of Ice & Fire, Gray Area, Secrets of the Citadel, Smokescreen, and Civilization Ex.

== See also ==
- Game of Thrones (franchise)
