= A Game of Thrones (board game) =

Strategy board game

A Game of Thrones: The Board Game
- Players: 3–6^{1}
- Setup time: <10 minutes
- Playing time: 3–5 hours
- Chance: Some
- Skills: Arithmetic
- ^{1} The A Storm of Swords expansion limits the number to three or four players.

A Game of Thrones: The Board Game is a strategy board game created by Christian T. Petersen and published by Fantasy Flight Games in 2003. The game is based on the A Song of Ice and Fire series of high fantasy novels by George R. R. Martin. It was followed in 2004 by the expansion A Clash of Kings, and in 2006 by the expansion A Storm of Swords.

A Game of Thrones allows players to take on the roles of several of the Great Houses of Westeros vying for control of the Seven Kingdoms, including House Stark, House Lannister, House Baratheon, House Greyjoy, House Tyrell, and as of the expansion A Clash of Kings, House Martell. Players maneuver armies to secure support in the various regions that comprise the Seven Kingdoms, with the goal of capturing enough support to claim the Iron Throne. The basic gameplay mechanics are reminiscent of Diplomacy, especially in the order-giving process, though A Game of Thrones is significantly more complicated overall. Upon its release, the game received positive reviews, and was nominated for several awards.

== Playable Houses ==
- Arryn (included in A Feast for Crows expansion and Mother of Dragons expansion)
- Baratheon
- Greyjoy
- Lannister
- Martell (included in A Clash of Kings expansion and the second edition)
- Stark
- Targaryen (included in Mother of Dragons expansion)
- Tyrell

== Gameplay ==
=== Victory condition ===
The goal of the game is to be the first to control a specific number of cities and strongholds, determined in advance by the number of players, or to control the most cities and strongholds at the end of ten turns, to take the Iron Throne.

=== Setup ===
The game is played on a board that divides the continent of Westeros into several regions. Most regions have at least one icon representing a city, a stronghold, a support barrel, or a power icon, and some key locations have multiples of such icons. Each player selects a starting House, places starting units on the board as indicated by the instructions, places House markers on the Supply and three Influence tracks, and takes the hand of seven House characters to be used in battles.

At the beginning of the game, the players with House markers on the highest positions in the Iron Throne, Fiefdoms, and King's Court Influence tracks will start with the Iron Throne, Valyrian Steel Blade, and Messenger Raven special tokens respectively.

The three Westeros decks are shuffled, and placed off to the side where all players can see. A deck of cards representing the actions of the Wildlings is placed on the board, along with a Wildling threat token indicating the strength of the Wildlings should they attack.

=== Westeros decks ===
Starting with the second turn, at the beginning of each round, the top card from each of the three Westeros decks are revealed, and their effects carried out. The Westeros decks can allow players to muster new forces, cause players to reevaluate their position on the Supply track, have all players bid for positions on the Influence tracks, provide restrictions on orders, or cause the Wildlings to attack.

=== Placing orders ===
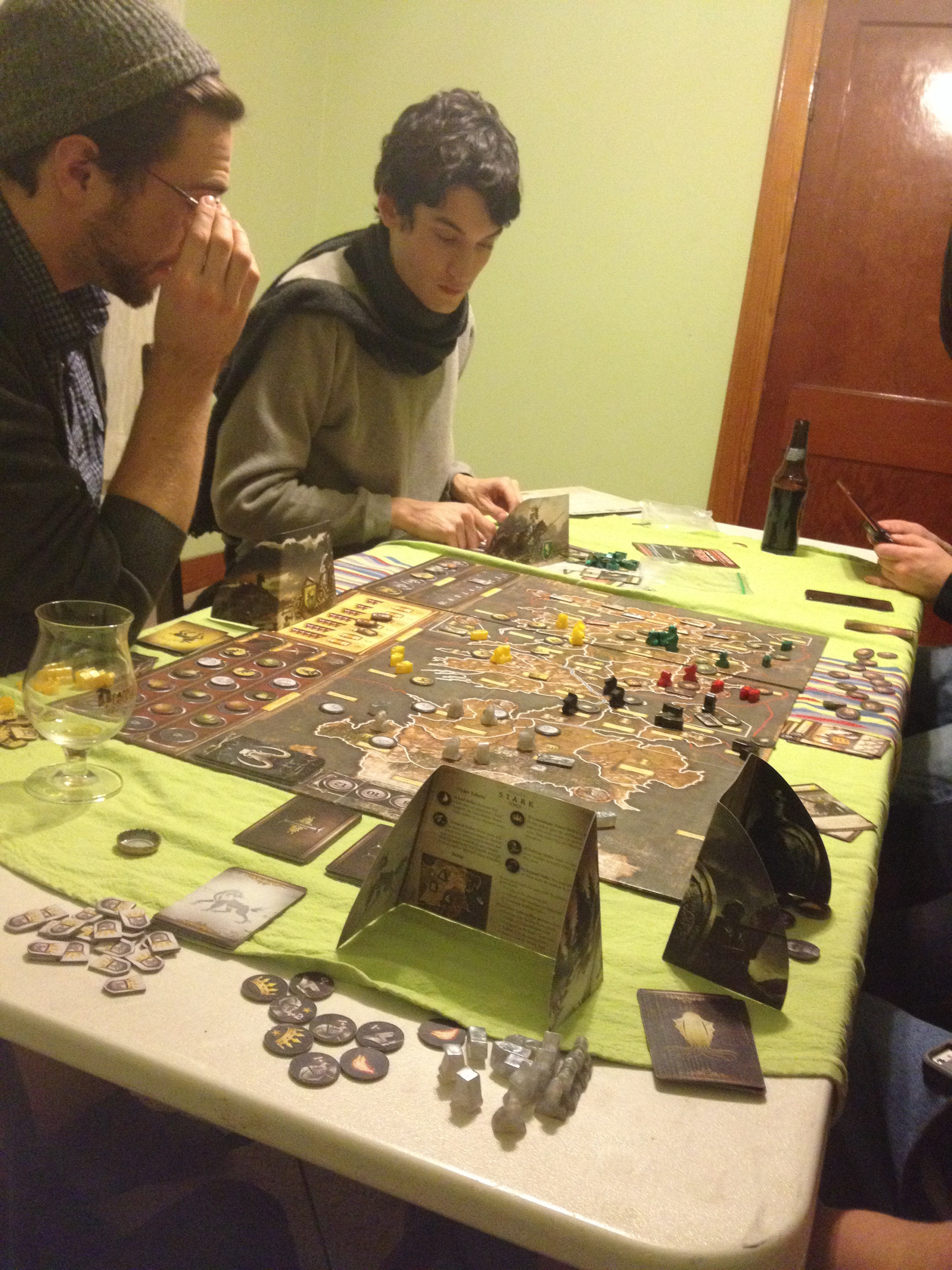
The game in progress

A distinctive feature of A Game of Thrones is that players place order tokens to every region with a unit that the player controls, outlining the basic actions units in that region can perform. All orders are revealed once all have been placed, requiring players to strategize and outthink their opponents. In addition, players only have a limited supply of each type of order token, limiting the number of various actions that can be planned.

There are five types of orders.

1. March orders are used to move units from one region to another and initiate battle if an enemy unit is in the new region.
2. Defend orders provide bonuses to units that are attacked in the region.
3. Support orders allow some of the units in a region to participate in battles that occur in neighboring regions.
4. Raid orders allow a player to remove certain opponent orders (Support and Consolidate Power) from neighboring regions.
5. Consolidate Power orders allow a player to collect more power tokens, which can be used to later bid on positions on the Influence tracks.

Each player receives three of each order each turn, however one of each type is marked by a star. In addition to the limit of three of each type of order, a player is limited to playing a maximum number of starred orders determined by his position on the King's Court Influence track.

The Messenger Raven special token, held by the player in the highest position on the King's Court Influence track, allows a player to change one of his placed orders for an unused order after all orders have been revealed.

=== Executing orders ===
Orders are executed in a specific order, with each player alternating executing an order of a particular type. The order of play follows the order of House marks on the Iron Throne Influence track. First, players alternate executing any Raid orders in play, and then players alternate executing March orders. If a player uses a March order to move units into a region occupied by another player's units, a battle is initiated.

During a battle, each player totals the strength of all of his non-routed units in the disputed region, which may be modified by values on an appropriate March or Defend orders. Players may then solicit help from any units in adjacent regions, controlled by any player including those involved in the battle, who have placed a Support order this round. Finally, players select an unused House card from their hand to represent their leader in the battle. House cards have various effects on the battle, which may include strength increases, extra damage, negation of damage, or other unique effects. The player with the highest total wins the battle, and the losing units must leave the region routed, or possibly be removed entirely if enough damage was inflicted. Ties are won by the player with a higher position on the Fiefdoms Influence track. Once per round, the player holding the Valyrian Steel Blade special token can add a +1 bonus to their side of a battle.

Finally, players can claim more power tokens by executing any Consolidate Power orders remaining on the board.

Other than during battles, if at any point a tie occurs, such as when bidding for positions on the Influence tracks, the player holding the Iron Throne special token determines who wins the tie.

=== Expansions ===
==== A Clash of Kings ====
The expansion A Clash of Kings was released in 2004, and added several variant rules that can be used with the base A Game of Thrones. Additions include House Martell, a new unit type (Siege Engines), rules for ports, a second possible set of 7 House character cards for all six Houses with a wider variety of effects, and new unique special orders for each House. This expansion was integrated into the base game with the release of the second edition.

==== A Storm of Swords ====
The expansion A Storm of Swords was released in 2006, and adds more variant rules to be used with the original A Game of Thrones, either with or without A Clash of Kings. Additions include Tactics cards, Ally cards, new sets of House character cards, new Westeros cards, new units, and a new gameboard for a standalone game, representing a focused view of the Trident region of Westeros.

== Second edition ==
In October 2011, the revised second edition was released by Fantasy Flight Games, with some minor changes to gameplay as well as new updated board and House card graphics. The second edition includes the additions introduced in the A Clash of Kings expansion to the base game (House Martell, siege engines, and ports, which are printed on the board). The presence of House Martell has resulted in the redesigning of the southern part of the map to have more regions. Other changes to game play include alterations to the starting positions of units for some Houses (such as Greyjoy), the abilities of house cards, the effects of consolidate power and raid special orders, and the possibility to use Tides of Battle cards to affect battles.

=== Expansions (second edition) ===
==== A Dance with Dragons ====
The expansion A Dance with Dragons was released in 2012, and adds 42 alternate House cards. Also included is a special scenario and alternate setup to reflect the current states of each of the six playable Houses and shorten the total turn length from ten down to six. Of special note, the A Dance with Dragons expansion was released prior to the A Feast for Crows expansion, deviating from the publication order of the books. This expansion is also "Print on Demand", meaning there is a slight variation in the physical look and feel of the cards compared to the cards that come with the second edition box.

==== A Feast for Crows ====
The expansion A Feast for Crows was released in 2013, and adds a new four-player scenario. An alternate victory condition, shortened play time, and a set of playable House cards for House Arryn are the main focus of this expansion. A total of 48 new cards are included. This expansion is also "Print on Demand", meaning there is a slight variation in the physical look and feel of the cards compared to the cards that come with the second edition box.

==== Mother of Dragons ====
Fantasy Flight Games released the third expansion of the series in 2018. The expansion introduces House Targaryen as a playable faction, complete with an Essos sideboard where they begin the game, as well as House Arryn, bringing the number of playable factions to eight. The expansion also introduces the Iron Bank of Braavos, which adds a loan system to the game.

== Reception ==
Jesse Scoble comments: "Like many of the best games, A Game of Thrones is fairly easy to learn, but has more than enough complexity and depth that it is challenging to master. Although there are a lot of components, both in pieces and in specific rules, playing through a few turns is all that most casual players will need in order to pick it up. The rulebook is short and well-illustrated with examples that cover most situations, and Fantasy Flight's website is updated with a current FAQ for more rare occurrences. The randomizing factors — from house selection to the Clash of Kings bidding event — ensure that the game has a lot of variety, and calls for players to think quickly to react to new and unexpected situations as they arise."

Shannon Appelcline in his history of Fantasy Flight Games called A Game of Thrones board game "ground-breaking for its combination of euro and American mechanics" and credited it with influencing the later FFG board games that likewise profited from a "mixture of tight eurogame mechanics and deep American theming".

In 2004, A Game of Thrones won three Origins Awards for Best Traditional Board Game, Best Board Game, and Best Board Game Design for the year 2003.

== Reviews ==
- Backstab #46
- Pyramid
- Rebel Times #1 (first edition)
  - Rebel Times #2 (A Clash of Kings expansion)
  - Rebel Times #3 (A Storm of Swords expansion)
- Rebel Times #54 (second edition)
  - Rebel Times #63 (A Dance with Dragons expansion)
  - Rebel Times #76 (A Feast for Crows expansion)
- Syfy

== See also ==
- A Game of Thrones (card game)
- A Game of Thrones (role-playing game)
