= The Book of Swords =

Anthology of fantasy stories by Gardner Dozois,

- Editor: Gardner Dozois
- Author: Various
- Language: English
- Genre: Fantasy
- Publisher: Bantam Spectra
- Publication date: October 10, 2017
- Publication place: United States
- Media type: Print (Hardcover)
- Pages: 544
- ISBN: 0399593764

The Book of Swords is an anthology of fantasy stories collected by American author and anthologist Gardner Dozois, released in print on October 10, 2017, and in audiobook on October 19, 2017.

The Book of Swords
- Audiobook edition
- Media type: Digital audio (streaming)
- Publisher: Random House Audio
- Distributor: HarperCollins
- Release date: October 19, 2017
- Recording length: 22 hrs, 13 mins
- Narrator: Various

== Background ==
George R. R. Martin clarified in January 2017 that unlike his previous anthology collaborations with Dozois, he was merely a contributor to The Book of Swords, which was edited by Dozois alone. Dozois notes in his introduction that this anthology is set to focus on the fantasy sub-genre of sword and sorcery, which he notes has often been mischaracterised as "epic fantasy", and collected these stories to reassert and exemplify the sword and sorcery genre in its own right. He notes that the anthology is intentionally a collection of the sub-genre's stable of "classic" writers, such as Holland, Nix, Hobb and Martin, along with a range of newcomers to the genre, such as Bear, Tidhar, Liu and Lynch.

== Contents ==
Title	Author	Narrator	Notes
Introduction	Gardner Dozois	Arthur Morey	
"The Best Man Wins"	K.J. Parker	John Lee	
"Her Father's Sword"	Robin Hobb	Katharine McEwan	A Realms of the Elderlings story
"The Hidden Girl"	Ken Liu	Kim Mai Guest	
"The Sword of Destiny"	Matthew Hughes	Elliot Hill	
""I Am a Handsome Man," said Apollo Crow"	Kate Elliott	Steve West	
"The Triumph of Virtue"	Walter Jon Williams	Elliot Hill	
"The Mocking Tower"	Daniel Abraham	Richard Brewer	
"Hrunting"	C. J. Cherryh	John Lee	Relating to the Norse mythological sword of the same name
"A Long, Cold Trail"	Garth Nix	Nicholas Guy Smith	Also published in the collection Sir Hereward and Mister Fitz: Stories of the Witch Knight and the Puppet Sorcerer by Garth Nix (2023)
"When I was a Highway Man"	Ellen Kushner	Kirby Heyborne	
"The Smoke of Gold is Glory"	Scott Lynch	Ralph Lister	
"The Colgrid Conundrum"	Rich Larson	Mark Deakins	
"The King's Evil"	Elizabeth Bear	Julia Whelan	
"Waterfalling"	Lavie Tidhar	Mark Deakins	
"The Sword Tyraste"	Cecelia Holland	Steve West	
"The Sons of the Dragon"	George R.R. Martin	Ralph Lister	A historical writing set in the world of A Song of Ice and Fire

== Audiobook ==
The audiobook version of The Book of Swords was released on October 19, 2017. Its narrators include Arthur Morey, Katharine McEwan, Kim Mai Guest, Elliot Hill, Steve West, Richard Brewer, Nicholas Guy Smith, Kirby Heyborne, Ralph Lister, Mark Deakins, and Julia Whelan. This collection totals 22 hours and 13 minutes, and was produced by Random House Audio for HarperCollins Publishers.
