= List of A Song of Ice and Fire video games =

Video games based on A Song of Ice and Fire franchise

A Song of Ice and Fire is a series of fantasy novels by George R. R. Martin. The novels were later adapted for the HBO television series Game of Thrones in 2011.

== Video games ==
As of 2026, fourteen video games based on the A Song of Ice and Fire novels and Game of Thrones series have been released. The following table showcases the corresponding title, release date, publisher, developer, and the platforms on which each game was released, along with any other relevant information.

Key
Blank cell indicates title was not released on any platform(s) by the specified manufacturers
Cell with games console(s) indicates title was released on platform(s) by the specified manufacturers

List of A Song of Ice and Fire video games
Title	Release details	Platform(s)			
Title	Release details	PC	Console	Mobile	Other
A Game of Thrones: Genesis	Released: September 28, 2011; Publisher: Focus Home Interactive; Developer: Amusement Cyanide	Microsoft Windows			
Game of Thrones	Released: May 15, 2012; Publishers: Atlus USA, Focus Home Interactive; Developer: Cyanide	Microsoft Windows	Xbox 360; PlayStation 3		
Game of Thrones Ascent	Released: February 21, 2013; Publishers: Disruptor Beam; Developer: Disruptor Beam			iOS; Android	Facebook; Web browser
Game of Thrones	Released: December 2, 2014–November 17, 2015; Publishers: Telltale Games; Developer: Telltale Games	Microsoft Windows macOS	Xbox 360; Xbox One; PlayStation 3 PlayStation 4	iOS; Android	
Game of Thrones: Conquest	Released: October 19, 2017; Publishers: Warner Bros. Interactive Entertainment; Developer: Turbine			iOS; Android	
Reigns: Game of Thrones	Released: October 18, 2018; Publishers: Devolver Digital; Developer: Nerial	Microsoft Windows; Linux macOS	Nintendo Switch	iOS; Android	
Game of Thrones: Winter is Coming	Released: March 26, 2019; Publishers: Yoozoo Games; Developer: Yoozoo Games	Microsoft Windows		iOS; Android	Web browser
Game of Thrones: Slots Casino	Released: May 30, 2019; Publishers: Zynga; Developer: Zynga			iOS; Android	Facebook; Web browser Fire OS
Game of Thrones: Beyond the Wall	Released: March 26, 2020 (iOS), April 3, 2020 (Android); Publishers: Behaviour Interactive; Developer: GAEA			iOS; Android	
Game of Thrones: Tale of Crows	Released: August 7, 2020; Publishers: Devolver Digital; Developer: That Silly Studio	macOS		iOS	tvOS
A Game of Thrones: The Board Game – Digital Edition	Released: October 6, 2020 (PC), April 7, 2021 (Mobile); Publishers: Asmodee Digital; Developer: Dire Wolf Digital	Microsoft Windows macOS		iOS; Android	
Game of Thrones: Legends	Released: July 25, 2024; Publishers: Zynga; Developer: Zynga			iOS; Android	Web browser
Game of Thrones: Kingsroad	Released: March 26, 2025 (PC early access), full release May 21, 2025; Publishers: Netmarble; Developer: Netmarble	Microsoft Windows		iOS; Android	
Game of Thrones: Dragonfire	Released: June 2, 2026; Publishers: Warner Bros. Games, HBO; Developer: Warner Bros. Games Boston			iOS; Android	
Game of Thrones: War for Westeros	Release: 2027; Publishers: PlaySide Studios; Developer: PlaySide Studios	Microsoft Windows			

List of canceled A Song of Ice and Fire video games
Title	Release details	Platform(s)			
Title	Release details	PC	Console	Mobile	Other
Game of Thrones: Seven Kingdoms	Released: Canceled; Publishers: Bigpoint Artplant; Developer: Bigpoint				Web browser
Game of Thrones: Season Two	Released: Canceled; Publishers: Telltale Games; Developer: Telltale Games	Microsoft Windows macOS	Xbox 360; Xbox One; PlayStation 3 PlayStation 4	iOS; Android	

== See also ==
- Game of Thrones (franchise)
- List of A Song of Ice and Fire tabletop games
- List of video game franchises
