= Game of Thrones: Seven Kingdoms =

- Developers: Bigpoint; Artplant
- Publisher: Bigpoint
- Engine: Unity
- Platform: Browser
- Release: Cancelled
- Genre: Massively multiplayer online role-playing
- Mode: Multiplayer

Game of Thrones: Seven Kingdoms was a fantasy massively multiplayer online role-playing game (MMORPG) under development by Bigpoint and Artplant. The game was based on the television series Game of Thrones.

After Bigpoint was acquired by Yoozoo Games in 2016, the license was instead used to produce the game Game of Thrones: Winter is Coming, eventually released in 2019.

== Gameplay ==
Game of Thrones: Seven Kingdoms was to be set within the fictional realm of Westeros, and will use a third-person viewpoint. Gameplay was planned to be mainly based around player vs player (PvP) combat, which would involve small group combat, one on one duels and siege battles, large scale battles in which players must capture keeps, forts and castles. Player vs Environment (PvE) combat was planned to be available at launch, although this was not a major priority. Combat would be realtime, with movement controlled using the WASD keys.

Players would be able to come together to form guilds, known as lesser houses. Lesser houses align themselves with one of the three major houses in-game: Baratheon, Stark or Lannister. Solo play will be possible, although group play will be encouraged. Players would also be able to customize their characters by changing features such as hair and clothing.

== Development ==
Game of Thrones: Seven Kingdoms was announced in February 2012, with the first look being unveiled at the Game Developers Conference in March 2012. The first gameplay footage was shown in a trailer released on July 12, 2012.

The game was under development by German videogame developer Bigpoint, and Norwegian developer Artplant. The studios have previously worked together on Battlestar Galactica Online, another browser based multiplayer game. The game was being made in collaboration with HBO. Everything put in game was reviewed by HBO in advance, and Bigpoint worked with the HBO design teams. In the beginning of development, the game was being built using an in-house engine "Nebula". During considerable redesigns the game was rebuilt in Amazon Lumberyard.
