= List of A Song of Ice and Fire tabletop games =

Tabletop games based on A Song of Ice and Fire franchise

A Song of Ice and Fire is a series of high fantasy novels by George R. R. Martin. The novels were later adapted for the HBO television series Game of Thrones in 2011. A prequel television series, House of the Dragon, was released in 2022.

== Tabletop games ==
The following table is a list of board games, card games, and miniature wargames based on the A Song of Ice and Fire novels, Game of Thrones, and House of the Dragon television series, with their corresponding titles and release details.

Title	Year	Players	Type	Publisher	Ref.
A Game of Thrones Collectible Card Game	2002	2-5	Collectible card game	Fantasy Flight Games	
A Game of Thrones: The Board Game	2003	3-5	Board game	Fantasy Flight Games	
A Game of Thrones The Card Game	2008	2-4	Card game	Fantasy Flight Games	
Battles of Westeros	2010	2	Miniature wargame	Fantasy Flight Games	
A Game of Thrones: The Board Game (Second Edition)	2011	3-6	Board game	Fantasy Flight Games	
A Game of Thrones: The Card Game (Second Edition)	2015	2-4	Card game	Fantasy Flight Games	
Game of Thrones: The Card Game	2012	2	Card game	Fantasy Flight Games	
Game of Thrones: Westeros Intrigue	2014	2-6	Card game	Fantasy Flight Games	
Risk: Game of Thrones	2015	2-7	Board game	The Op Games	
Monopoly: Game of Thrones Collector's Edition	2015	2-6	Board game	The Op Games	
Game of Thrones: The Iron Throne	2016	3-5	Board game	Fantasy Flight Games	
Game of Thrones: The Trivia Game	2016	2-4	Board game	Fantasy Flight Games	
A Game of Thrones: Hand of the King	2016	2-4	Card game	Fantasy Flight Games	
Clue: Game of Thrones	2016	2-6	Board game	The Op Games	
A Game of Thrones: Catan - Brotherhood of the Watch	2017	3-4	Board game	Asmodee	
A Song of Ice & Fire: Tabletop Miniatures Game	2018	2	Miniature wargame	CMON Limited	
Monopoly: Game of Thrones	2018	2-6	Board game	Hasbro	
Game of Thrones: Oathbreaker	2019	5-8	Board game	Dire Wolf	
Funkoverse Strategy Game: Game of Thrones 100	2020	2-4	Board game	Funko Games	
A Game of Thrones: B'Twixt	2022	3-6	Card game	Fantasy Flight Games	
House of the Dragon: Sky of Fire	2023	2-4	Board game	Shuffle Card Games	
Monopoly: House of the Dragon	2024	2-6	Board game	Hasbro	
House of the Dragon: Dark Dealings	2024	3-6	Card game	Funko Games	
Tiny Epic Game of Thrones	2025	1-4	Board game	Gamelyn Games	
Legendary: Game of Thrones Deck Building Game	2025	2-4	Card game	Upper Deck Entertainment	
Risk Strike: Game of Thrones	2025	2-5	Card game	The Op Games	
TRIVIAL PURSUIT: Game of Thrones	2025	1+	Trivia game	The Op Games	
Game of Thrones: Masters of Intrigue	2026	3-5	Card game	Resurrection Games	
A Song of Ice and Fire: Tactics	TBA	2	Miniature wargame	CMON Limited	

== See also ==
- Game of Thrones (franchise)
- List of A Song of Ice and Fire video games
