= Game of Thrones: Dragonfire =

2026 video game

- Cover
- Developer: Warner Bros. Games Boston
- Publishers: Warner Bros. Games; HBO
- Series: House of the Dragon
- Platforms: Android; iOS
- Release: June 2, 2026
- Genres: 4X strategy; Role-playing
- Modes: Single-player, multiplayer

Game of Thrones: Dragonfire is a 2026 4X strategy role-playing video game developed by Warner Bros. Games Boston and published by Warner Bros. Games and HBO. It is based on the television series House of the Dragon. The game was announced in April 2026, and was released on June 2, 2026.

== Gameplay ==
Game of Thrones: Dragonfire features gameplay that allows players to raise dragons and use them in various battles. Players can use various dragons as well as upgrade them. The game features various modes including a story mode and Raids. The game allows players to step into the role of a Valyrian descendant and features characters from House of the Dragon, such as Rhaenyra Targaryen, Aegon II Targaryen, and Aemond Targaryen.

== Post-launch content ==
In August 2026, the game launched a special event that is set to run until August 24th that introduced new content and brought back the dragons Moondancer, Sheepstealer, Sunfyre, Tairax, Tessarion, and Vermax.

== Marketing and release ==
Game of Thrones: Dragonfire was released on June 2, 2026, for Android and iOS.

== See also ==
- List of A Song of Ice and Fire video games
