= A Game of Thrones (disambiguation) =

A Game of Thrones is the first novel in George R. R. Martin's fantasy series A Song of Ice and Fire.

A Game of Thrones or Game of Thrones may also refer to:

== Franchise ==
- Game of Thrones (franchise), American fantasy media franchise

== Television ==
- Game of Thrones, an HBO television series, based on A Song of Ice and Fire
  - House of the Dragon, a prequel series to Games of Thrones
  - A Knight of the Seven Kingdoms, a prequel series to Games of Thrones

== Stage play ==
- Game of Thrones: The Mad King, stage play by Duncan MacMillan

== Books ==
- A Game of Thrones (comics), a 2011 comic book adaptation of George R. R. Martin's fantasy novel
- A Song of Ice and Fire, the series of novels on which the television series Game of Thrones is based

== Games ==
- A Game of Thrones (board game), a 2003 strategy board game
- A Game of Thrones (card game), a 2002 card game
  - A Game of Thrones: Second Edition (card game), a 2015 card game
- A Game of Thrones (role-playing game), a 2005 tabletop role-playing game
- A Game of Thrones: Genesis, a 2011 strategy video game developed by Cyanide
- Game of Thrones (2012 video game), a 2012 action role-playing video game developed by Cyanide
- Game of Thrones (2014 video game), a 2014 episodic video game developed by Telltale Games
- Game of Thrones Ascent, a 2013 strategy video game developed by Disruptor Beam
- Game of Thrones: Seven Kingdoms, a canceled browser-based MMORPG developed by Bigpoint Games
- Reigns: Game of Thrones, a 2018 strategy video game developed by Nerial
- Game of Thrones: Winter Is Coming, a 2019 video game

== See also ==
- A Clash of Kings (disambiguation)
- War of succession, the political and martial games of obtaining the throne
- Power politics, the political and martial power games played by the enthroned
