= Lin Qi (businessman) =

Chinese entrepreneur

Lin Qi (Chinese: 林奇; name often styled in the media as Lynch; 1981 – 25 December 2020) was a Chinese entrepreneur who founded Yoozoo Games.

== Early life ==
Lin Qi was born in 1981 in Wenzhou, Zhejiang, to parents who were both involved in traditional manufacturing. From an early age, Lin Qi developed a fondness for video games. After graduating from high school, he pursued studies in computer information management at Nanjing University of Posts and Telecommunications, graduating in 2004. After graduating, he worked as a software engineer for Zhejiang's China Telecom, and left in 2007 to become a partner in an online advertising agency.

== Yoozoo ==
He founded Yoozoo in June 2009, which is focused on the creation and production of video games. The business experienced rapid expansion, with the establishment of subsidiaries and affiliates, including Youzoo Interactive, and diversifying into fields such as television and film production.

In 2019, Yoozoo Games developed and published Game of Thrones: Winter is Coming, a multi-player online game based on the HBO hit television series, which itself became a hit.

Soon after, Lin Qi was involved in the production of the Netflix science fiction series 3 Body Problem, which is based on computer engineer and author Liu Cixin's award-winning Remembrance of Earth's Past trilogy series of books.

According to the Hurun Report, Lin Qi had assets worth between 4.5 and 6.8 billion yuan, or, in 2024, between $575 and $635 million.

== Assassination ==
Lin Qi reportedly felt unwell after getting off work on 16 December 2020. He sought medical treatment on his own, but went to a hospital the following day. After doctors determined that the patient had been poisoned with methylmercury chloride (CH_{3}Hg^{+}), the hospital contacted the police, who initiated an investigation. Zhao Jilong, the executive producer of 3 Body Problem, and his wife were also poisoned, but survived. Lin Qi died on 25 December 2020.

Police eventually arrested Xu Yao, a former Yoozoo Games executive, who was indicted for murder, tried, and, in 2024, found guilty and sentenced to death. According to the court's decision, his motive was a dispute over running the business, while other sources assign it to Xu getting a pay cut and being demoted for poor work performance. Xu was executed on 21 May 2026.
