= PlaySide Studios =

Australian video game developer and publisher

PlaySide Studios Limited
- Type: Public
- Traded as: ASX: PLY
- Industry: Video games
- Founded: January 2012; 14 years ago
- Founders: Gerry Sakkas; Aaron Pasias; Mark Goulopoulos
- Headquarters: Docklands, Victoria, Australia
- Key people: Benn Skender (CEO)
- Products: Video games
- Revenue: ▼ A$48.7 million (2025)
- Net income: ▼A$−12.1 million (2025)
- Number of employees: 261 (2026)
- Website: www.playsidestudios.com

PlaySide Studios is an Australian video game developer and publisher based in Docklands, Victoria. Launched in 2012, it is one of Australia's largest independent game developers, with games across mobile, PC, console, and virtual reality platforms. In 2020, it became the first Australian-based game developer to list on the Australian Securities Exchange under the ticker ASX: PLY.

== History ==
=== Foundation and early years ===
PlaySide Studios was registered in December 2011 and began operating in January 2012. It was established by Gerry Sakkas, Aaron Pasias and Mark Goulopoulos. Sakkas, a former designer at Visceral Games, funded the startup with a redundancy payment of about A$15,000 that he received following the closure of Electronic Arts' Melbourne office. Pasias, a friend and property investor, provided additional capital and became finance director, while Goulopoulos served as a non-executive director.

In its first year, the studio released Catch the Ark, which helped it attract its first clients. PlaySide went on to focus on mobile games and work-for-hire development for entertainment companies including Disney, Warner Bros. and Nickelodeon, producing games for the Jumanji, Lego Batman, Cars and Teenage Mutant Ninja Turtles film franchises.

=== Public listing and expansion ===
In the financial year ending 30 June 2020, PlaySide reported revenue of A$7.7 million, up 56 per cent on the prior year. By that time the company employed about 80 staff and had produced more than 50 titles since its founding.

Ahead of its December 2020 listing, PlaySide completed a pre-IPO raise of A$3 million, then raised A$15 million through its initial public offering, issuing shares at 20 cents each in an offer managed by Canaccord Genuity. This gave the company an expected market capitalisation of about A$73 million. PlaySide debuted on the Australian Securities Exchange on 17 December, becoming the first Australian video game developer to list on the exchange. The three founders retained a majority stake, and the company held a 27 per cent strategic investment in the esports consultancy BIG Esports.

In 2021, the company acquired the Dumb Ways to Die franchise from Metro Trains Melbourne for A$2.25 million. The acquisition included the copyright, trademarks and digital assets of the rail safety campaign originally created by McCann Australia in 2012. The franchise became popular again on TikTok in 2023.

In November 2021, while announcing a planned A$28 million capital raising, PlaySide said it would establish a dedicated research and development team for the metaverse and blockchain gaming, and invest to ensure it was "at the forefront of Blockchain gaming globally". In January 2022, PlaySide expanded into Web3 with BEANS, a non-fungible token (NFT) collection based on the Dumb Ways to Die characters. The tokens were marketed as playable avatars for a planned massively multiplayer online game called Beanland, which the company said would launch on PC in late 2022 and on mobile in 2023. The tokens went on sale in February 2022 and brought in about A$8.4 million in revenue, according to the company's market disclosures, with some priced as high as $1,300 each. Later that year, company executives said that while the studio experimented with emerging technologies, Web3 and NFTs were no longer a primary focus of its long-term strategy.

=== 2024–present: Restructuring and new releases ===
In October 2024, the studio released Kill Knight, an arcade-style shooter. Later that month, PlaySide forecast flat revenue for the 2025 financial year as it invested in three upcoming games, and its shares fell more than 37 per cent. In January 2025, the company's share price fell about 40 per cent after a trading update cut its revenue guidance. The company said new work-for-hire contracts had been slower to arrive than expected, while it continued to invest in developing its own games. In April 2025, PlaySide laid off around 100 staff in a restructure "triggered by delays in winning work-for-hire contracts", and Benn Skender succeeded Sakkas as chief executive.

In August 2025, PlaySide cancelled Beanland, citing the restructure and an internal strategic review, and listed it under project closures in its 2025 financial year results presentation. PlaySide did not offer refunds to NFT holders. Capital Brief reported that some buyers described the collapse as a "rug pull", and that one holder was left around US$44,000 (A$61,000) out of pocket as the tokens lost most of their value.

In April 2026, PlaySide published Mouse: P.I. for Hire, a noir first-person shooter styled after 1930s cartoons, developed by the Polish studio Fumi Games. In June 2026, PlaySide announced that Meta had terminated its outsourced development contracts for the Horizon Worlds social virtual reality platform, ending a relationship that dated back to 2021. Work would end on 31 July 2026 rather than the extended end date of 31 December 2026. The company expected to lose about A$4 million in revenue in the 2027 financial year and began consulting staff on likely redundancies; its shares fell by almost 30 per cent on the announcement.

In September 2026, the company released Dumb Ways to Build, the first Dumb Ways to Die game for PC and consoles. PlaySide pitched the co-operative multiplayer game at the "friendslop" genre of low-budget games designed to be played in groups. During the year it also signed publishing agreements for Dew, a game by the Swedish studio MVRX Games due for release in 2028, and The Magician's Hand. After a period of reduced external development work, PlaySide announced several new client contracts in October 2026, a month after consolidating its Port Melbourne and South Melbourne offices into a single studio in Docklands.

PlaySide's largest project, the real-time strategy game Game of Thrones: War for Westeros, is scheduled for release in early 2027. It stems from a multi-game licence agreement signed with Warner Bros. Games in December 2023 to develop two PC and console titles based on an unnamed franchise, later confirmed as Game of Thrones. The game was announced at Summer Game Fest in June 2025 for release in 2026, but in July 2026 the studio delayed it, saying it needed more time to reach the quality it was aiming for. A new trailer was shown at Gamescom in August 2026.

== Games and operations ==
PlaySide operates through three divisions: Original IP, External Projects (work-for-hire development for other companies), and Publishing.

Titles developed or published by PlaySide include:

- Catch the Ark (2013)
- SpongeBob: Sponge on the Run (2015)
- AR Dragon (2017)
- Dumb Ways to Die series
- Age of Darkness: Final Stand (2021)
- Kill Knight (2024)
- Sid Meier's Civilization VII VR (Meta Quest version, 2025)
- Mouse: P.I. for Hire (2026)
- Dumb Ways to Build (2026)

=== Technology ===
In its early years, PlaySide worked with emerging technologies, particularly augmented reality (AR) and virtual reality (VR). The studio developed Zombie Riot as one of the launch titles for the Oculus Touch controllers, and later released AR Dragon as a launch title for Apple's ARKit platform.

==== Artificial intelligence ====
PlaySide has used artificial intelligence tools in its development pipeline since at least 2023, when The Guardian reported that the studio had used generative AI voices for placeholder dialogue while preproducing Age of Darkness: Final Stand; human voice actors replaced them in the final release. The same year, the company said it used tools such as ChatGPT and Midjourney for early concept work, and anticipated that future AI tools could "generate an entire world in a game by the click of a button".

At the company's 2026 annual general meeting, chief executive Benn Skender said that recent advances in AI had "significantly reduced the time it takes to bring concepts to market", made it cheaper to port games to every console platform and to launch them free of major bugs, and increased the output of its teams across all game development disciplines. Skender presented this as part of a shift towards smaller teams and faster development cycles, pointing to Dumb Ways to Build, which a small team developed in around six months, and setting a goal of development cycles of around 18 months per title. The company said its External Projects division was also doing AI-related development for clients.
