= Game of Thrones: Legends =

2024 video game

- Cover
- Developer: Zynga
- Publisher: Zynga
- Series: Game of Thrones
- Platforms: Android; iOS
- Release: July 25, 2024
- Genres: Puzzle; Role-playing
- Modes: Single-player, multiplayer

Game of Thrones: Legends is a 2024 puzzle role-playing video game developed and published by Zynga. It is based on the television series Game of Thrones, House of the Dragon, and A Knight of the Seven Kingdoms. The game was announced in August 2023, and was released on July 25, 2024.

== Gameplay ==
Game of Thrones: Legends features puzzle RPG gameplay that allows players to color-match gems to defeat opponents. The game features various modes including a story mode and Raids. The game allows players to use characters from Game of Thrones, House of the Dragon, and A Knight of the Seven Kingdoms, such as Jon Snow, Rhaenyra Targaryen, and Ser Duncan "Dunk" the Tall. Players can use various characters together on teams as well as upgrade their characters and equip various items.

== Post-launch content ==
The game's logo.

In March 2025, the game launched the Robb's War event, featuring Robb and Talisa Stark, as well as adding Lady Julie. In August, the game launched the War of the Three Banners event. In October, Rhaenys Targaryen (The Queen That Never Was) was added to the game alongside The Queen Who Never Was Summon and The Queen Who Never Was Mixed Summon. Later that month, Gregor Clegane (Qyburn's Creation) was added to the game alongside the Qyburn's Creation Focused Summon, the Qyburn's Creation Mixed Summon, and the Qyburn's Creation Proving Grounds. In December, the Night King (Bane of the Living) was added to the game alongside the Bane of the Living Focus Summon, the Bane of the Living Mixed Summon, and the Into the North Legend Trial. Later that month, Bran Stark (Fugitive Of Winterfell) was added to the game alongside the Winterfell Fugitive Focused Summon, the Winterfell Fugitive Mixed Summon, and the Dreams Of The Raven Proving Grounds.

In January 2026, it was announced that Ser Duncan "Dunk" the Tall and Prince Aegon "Egg" Targaryen, from the series, A Knight of the Seven Kingdoms, would be added to the game. Later that month, Ser Duncan "Dunk" the Tall ("Dunk" the Tourney Knight) was added to the game alongside the A Knight of the Realm Focused Summon, the A Knight of the Realm Mixed Summon, and The Tourney Knight Proving Grounds. Also in January, Jacaerys Velaryon (The Good Prince) was added to the game alongside The Good Prince Focused Summon and The Good Prince Mixed Summon. In February, Prince Aegon "Egg" Targaryen (The Boy Squire) was added to the game alongside The Squire Boy Focused Summon, The Squire Boy Mixed Summon, and The Squire Proving Grounds. Later that month, Osha (Wildling Guardian) was added to the game alongside the Wildling Guardian Focused Summon and the Wilding Guardian Mixed Summon. In March, Jaqen H'ghar (A Man) was added to the game alongside the A Man Focused Summon and A Man Mixed Summon. Later that month, Tywin Lannister (The Hand) was added to the game alongside The Hand Focused Summon, The Hand Mixed Summon, and The Hand of the King Proving Grounds. In April, Olenna Tyrell (The Queen of Thorns) was added to the game alongside The Queen of Thorns Focused Summon, The Queen of Thorns Mixed Summon, and The Queen of Thorns Proving Grounds. Later that month, Nymeria Sand (Second Daughter) was added to the game alongside The Second Daughter Focused Summon, The Second Daughter Mixed Summon, and the Second Daughter Proving Grounds. In May, Mance Rayder (King Beyond The Wall) was added to the game alongside the King Beyond The Wall Focused Summon, the King Beyond The Wall Mixed Summon, and the King Beyond The Wall Proving Grounds. Later that month, Daario Naharis (Advisor To The Queen) was added to the game alongside The Queen's Advisor Focused Summon, The Queen's Advisor Mixed Summon, and the Advisor To The Queen Proving Grounds. In June, Oberyn Martell (Prince of Dorne) was added to the game alongside The Red Viper Summon and the Red Viper Proving Grounds. Later that month, Seasmoke was added to the game alongside The Silver Shadow Summon and The Dragon Chooses Proving Grounds. In July, Daemon Targaryen (The Rogue Prince) was added to the game alongside The Rogue Prince summon and The Rogue Prince Proving Grounds. Later that month, Ser Gwayne Hightower (The Queen's Brother) was added to the game alongside The Knight of Oldtown summon and The Queen's Brother Proving Grounds. Later that month, Viserys I Targaryen (The Peaceful King) was also added to the game alongside the Legacy of Old Valyria summon and The Peaceful King Proving Grounds. In August, Tyland Lannister (The Golden Strategist) was added to the game alongside The Royal Treasury summon and The Golden Strategist Proving Grounds. Later that month, Brienne of Tarth (True Knight) was added to the game alongside the True Knight summon and The True Knight Proving Grounds. In September, Lyanna Mormont (Lady Of Bear Island) was added to the game alongside The Lady Of Bear Island summon and the Lady Of Bear Island Proving Grounds.

== Marketing and release ==
Game of Thrones: Legends was released on July 25, 2024, for Android and iOS alongside a trailer featuring Kit Harington, who portrayed Jon Snow on the HBO television series, Game of Thrones. In August 2024, an interview was posted featuring House of the Dragon actor Ewan Mitchell, who portrayed Prince Aemond Targaryen in the series, playing Game of Thrones: Legends while answering questions.

== See also ==
- List of A Song of Ice and Fire video games
