= Dumb Ways to Die =

2012 public campaign

- Thumbnail of the music video
- Agency: McCann
- Client: Metro Trains Melbourne
- Market: Victoria, Australia
- Release date: November 2012; 14 years ago

Dumb Ways to Die is an Australian public awareness campaign video and media franchise made by Metro Trains in Melbourne, Victoria to promote railway safety. The original public service announcement video for the awareness campaign went viral on social media after it was released on the internet in November 2012, amassing over 350 million views on YouTube. The campaign's animation was later developed into a mobile game available to iOS and Android devices.

On 1 October 2021, Australian game studio and publisher PlaySide Studios acquired the Dumb Ways to Die franchise for A$2.25 million from Metro.

== Campaign ==
The campaign was devised by advertising agency McCann Melbourne. It appeared in newspapers, local radio and outdoor advertising throughout the Metro Trains network and on Tumblr. John Mescall, executive creative director of McCann, said, "The aim of this campaign is to engage an audience that really doesn't want to hear any kind of safety message, and we think dumb ways to die will." McCann estimated that within two weeks, it had generated at least $50 million worth of global media value in addition to more than 700 media stories, for "a fraction of the cost of one TV ad". According to Metro Trains, the campaign contributed to a 20% reduction in "near-miss" accidents compared to the annual average, or 30% with respect to the same time of the year before from 13.29 near-misses per million kilometres in November 2011 – January 2012, to 9.17 near-misses per million kilometres in November 2012 – January 2013.

=== Animated video ===
The video was art directed by Patrick Baron, animated by Julian Frost, and produced by Cinnamon Darvall. It was uploaded to YouTube on 14 November 2012 and made public two days later. It featured bipedal creatures with different colours known as "beans", each bearing names such as Numpty, Hapless, Pillock, and Dippy (the first four beans in the video, listed in order of appearance) dying as a result of their own stupidity (doing such unwise, foolish, and dangerous things as setting their own hair on fire, provoking a grizzly bear by poking it with a stick, eating expired medicine, and having the lower half of their body eaten by piranhas); the final three beans shown in the video, named Stumble, Bonehead, and Putz, all die as a result of unsafe behaviour at train stations and/or railways, which are deemed "the dumbest ways to die".

The animated video has two versions, one in English, and one in Spanish, titled "Formas Tontas de Morir."

=== Song ===
"Dumb Ways to Die"
- Cover parodying Abbey Road

Song by Tangerine Kitty
- Released: 1 November 2012
- Genre: Folk-pop
- Length: 3:00
- Songwriters: Ollie McGill; John Mescall; Patrick Baron
- Producers: Ollie McGill; John Mescall; Patrick Baron

The song "Dumb Ways to Die" from the video was written by John Mescall and co created with Patrick Baron, music by Ollie McGill from the Cat Empire, who also produced it. It was performed by Emily Lubitz, the lead vocalist of Tinpan Orange, with McGill providing backing vocals. The band on the recording consists of Gavin Pearce on bass, Danny Farrugia on drums and Brett Wood on guitar. It was released on iTunes, attributed to the artist "Tangerine Kitty" (a reference to Tinpan Orange and The Cat Empire). The song, with a tempo of 128 beats per minute, is written in C major and a time signature of 4/4.

Charts

Chart (2012–13)	Peak position
Belgium (Ultratip Bubbling Under Flanders)	9
Netherlands (Single Top 100)	94
UK Independent (Official Charts)	38

=== Video games ===
Dumb Ways to Die
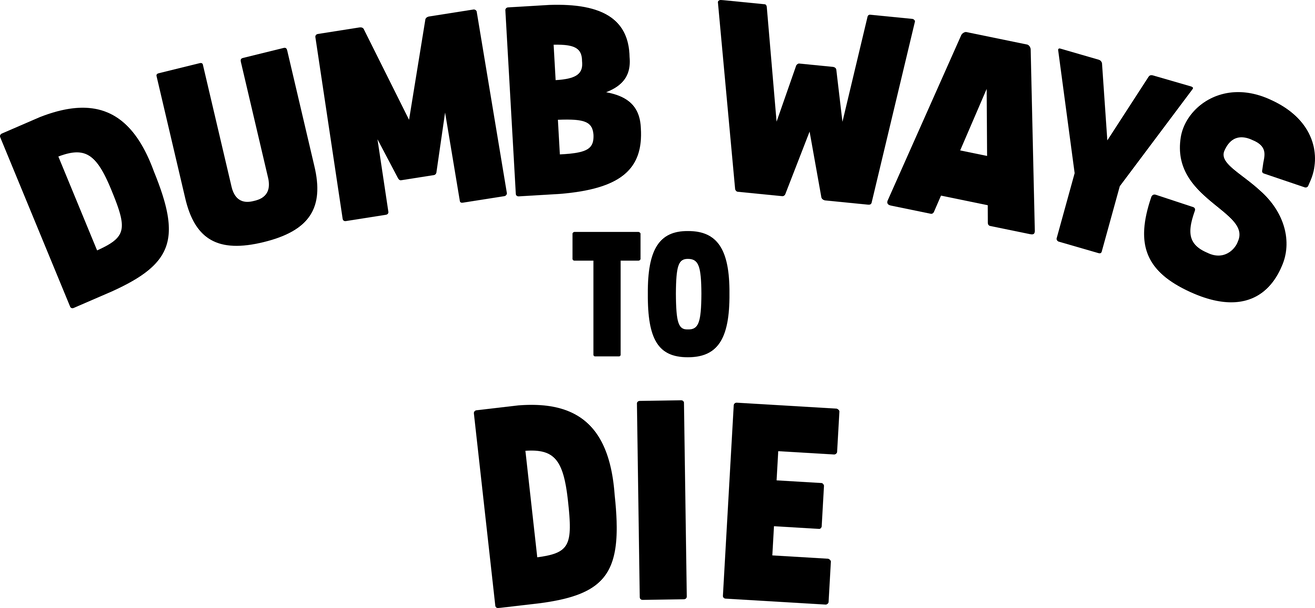
- Logo used since 2025
- Developers: Julian Frost; Samuel Baird
- Publishers: PlaySide Studios; Metro Trains Melbourne (formerly); PopReach
- Engine: Unity
- Platforms: iOS, Android
- Release: iOS: WW: 7 May 2013; Android: WW: 16 September 2013
- Genres: Action game, Puzzle game
- Mode: Single-player

On 6 May 2013, Metro released the Dumb Ways to Die game as an app for iOS devices. The game, developed by Julian Frost, Patrick Baron and Samuel Baird, invites players to avoid the dangerous activities engaged in by the various characters featured throughout the campaign. Within the app, players can also pledge to "not do dumb stuff around trains." The activities include things like getting toast out with a (metal) fork and poking a stick at a grizzly bear. An Android version was released in September 2013.

The game is similar to games in the WarioWare series. The game presents minigames based on the animated music video in rapid succession and becomes faster and more difficult the longer the game is played.

A sequel titled Dumb Ways to Die 2: The Games was released on 18 November 2014. In the sequel, there are a lot more varieties of challenges in each particular building, and each building has a particular theme, such as track-and-field- or medieval-themed levels. Before a train arrives at a building, the player plays a challenge to counter something related to trains. If successful, bonus points can be earned at the end of the game. There are at least 8 challenges each in every building. Like the original game, the game's characters do plenty of dangerous and unsafe activities. Lives can be lost by "dying" in one of the activities. The player has three chances to prevent the characters from dying.

A second sequel titled Dumb Ways to Die 3: World Tour was released on Android on the 20th of December, 2017 and on iOS on the 21st of December, 2017.

A spin-off series to the main games begun with Dumb Ways to Draw, released onto iOS on the 2nd of May 2019, and onto Android on the 3rd of May, 2019. The spin-off series continued with Dumb ways to Draw 2 on iOS on the 19th of December 2022, and on Android on the 26th of February 2023.

A third sequel titled Dumb Ways to Die 4 was released on Android and iOS on 2 May 2023.

The VR game Dumb Ways Free for All was released for Meta VR devices on the 6th of November in 2024.

On October 23, 2025, a new party game titled Dumb Ways to Party was announced, releasing on consoles and PC in 2026.

On the 10th of September in 2026, Dumb Ways to Build was released on PC, the Xbox Series S and X, the Play Station 5.

== Reception ==
Susie O'Brien in the Herald Sun in Melbourne criticised the ad for trivialising serious injuries and being about advertisers' ego rather than effective safety messages.

Simon Crerar of the Herald Sun wrote that the song's "catchy chorus was the most arresting hook since PSY's Gangnam Style." Alice Clarke writing in the Herald Sun described the video as "adorably morbid" and wrote that Victoria's public transport "broke its long running streak of terrible ads".

Daisy Dumas of The Sydney Morning Herald described it as "darkly cute—and irksomely catchy" and the chorus as "instant earworm material".

Michelle Starr of CNET described the campaign as the Darwin Awards meets The Gashlycrumb Tinies and the song as "a cutesy indie-pop hit in the style of Feist".

Logan Booker of Gizmodo described it as "taking a page out of the Happy Tree Friends book and mixing cute with horrifying".

Karen Stocks of YouTube Australia said the video was unusual due to the high number of views from mobile devices. Stocks attributed the success to "A snappy headline. A catchy tune that gets stuck in your head. And a message that is easy to understand and perfectly targeted."

The Sunshine Coast Daily described it as "the Gangnam Style of train safety campaigns".

Arlene Paredes of the International Business Times said the video was "brilliant in getting viewers' attention" and "arguably one of the cutest PSAs ever made."

=== Effectiveness and unwanted repercussions ===
The campaign received some criticism on the basis that suicide is one of the most influential causes of rail trauma, and the ad reinforces deadly trains as a possible suicide method. Writing in Mumbrella in February 2013, a former employee of Victoria's Department of Infrastructure advised critical thinking when evaluating claims made regarding improvements to safety. Reference was made specifically to the claimed 20 per cent reduction in risky behaviour as being "social media bullshit".

=== Censorship in Russia ===
In February 2013, Artemy Lebedev's blog was censored by Roskomnadzor, the Russian government agency in charge of Internet censorship, for including the video. Later that day, the YouTube video was also censored, with the "This content is not available in your country due to a legal complaint from the government" message. The official takedown notice sent to Livejournal.com was quoted, in part, by Lebedev in his blog.

The song's lyrics contains a description of different ways of committing suicide, such as: using drugs beyond their expiration date, standing on an edge of a platform, running across the rails, eating superglue and other. The animated personages demonstrate dangerous ways of suicide in attractive for children and teenagers comic format. The lines such as "Use a clothes dryer as a hiding place" and "I wonder what's this red button do?" contain an incitement to commit those acts.

Despite this, the video was still included on the ABC Show and was shown in more than 50 cities across Russia.

=== Awards ===
The campaign won seven Webby Awards in 2013 including the Best Animation Film & Video and Best Public Service & Activism (Social Content & Marketing).

It won three Siren Awards, run by Commercial Radio Australia, including the Gold Siren for best advertisement of the year and Silver Sirens for the best song and best campaign.

The public service announcement was awarded the Grand Trophy in the 2013 New York Festivals International Advertising Awards.

In June 2013, the campaign clip won the Integrated Grand Prix at the Cannes Lions International Festival of Creativity, and overall, won five Grand Prix awards, 18 Gold Lions, three Silver Lions, and two Bronze Lions, which was the most for any campaign in the festival's history.

== Legacy ==
=== Parodies ===
Within two weeks, the video had spawned over 85 parodies. Some renditions and parodies have been featured in national and international media:

- "Cool Things to Find" - featuring the Curiosity Mars rover. Cinesaurus noted that it took them six days and 250 man hours to create.
- "Dumb Ways to Die (In Video Games) Parody" by YouTube channel MegaSteakMan.
- "Dumb Ways to Die (Minecraft Edition)".
- "Grand Theft Auto V: Dumb Ways to Die".
- "Dumb Ways to Die – Game of Thrones Edition".
- "Annoying Ways to Die" from Annoying Orange, as noted by Socialtimes.
- "The Walking Dead + Dumb Ways to Die Parody" – live-action parody of characters from The Walking Dead.
- "Smart Ways to Live" by The Maccabeats – a cappella version as noted by Arutz Sheva.
- "Queremos Vivir en Caracas" (english: We Want to Live in Caracas) by Jointool Studios – A Venezuelan parody of Dumb Ways to Die.
- "Squid Game – A Dumb Ways to Die Parody" – by Ploy Boal won the Video of the Day Award on 19 April 2022 from Motion Design Awards.
- "Formas tontas de cargarse el mundo" (English: Dumb ways to destroy the world) – a parody by a Spanish non-profit organisation Ecovidrio focused on promoting ecological solutions, especially glass recycling.
- "Dumb Ways To Swim" A way to support water safety especially at the beach.

=== Life insurance partnership ===
Due to their success, the Dumb Ways to Die characters have been featured in a promotional campaign for Empire Life Insurance, with their key message being, "the dumbest way to die is without life insurance." However, the campaign was met with mixed reviews, with some advertising critics accusing Metro of "selling out" on a successful campaign.
