= Asheron's Call 2: Fallen Kings =

2002 video game

- Developer: Turbine Entertainment Software
- Publishers: Microsoft Game Studios (2002–2003); Turbine (2003–2005); Warner Bros. Interactive Entertainment (2012–2017)
- Platform: Windows
- Release: November 22, 2002 – January 31, 2017 (14 years, 2 months, 1 week and 2 days)
- Genre: MMORPG
- Mode: Multiplayer

Asheron's Call 2: Fallen Kings was a fantasy massively multiplayer online role-playing game (MMORPG) for Microsoft Windows which was released on November 22, 2002 and shut down on December 30, 2005 before it was relaunched as a beta for active Asheron's Call subscribers between 2012 and 2017. It is a sequel to 1999's Asheron's Call, although content, graphics and gameplay dynamics differed greatly from its predecessor.

Both games were developed by Turbine Entertainment Software and originally published by Microsoft Game Studios, until Turbine purchased the Asheron's Call intellectual property in December 2003. The Microsoft-to-Turbine transition was completed in 2005. In 2004 and 2005, Turbine entered business arrangements with Jolt Online Gaming to operate Asheron's Call 2 in Europe and with Sony Online Entertainment to distribute the game's first expansion, Asheron's Call 2: Legions, under the Station Publishing label.

The original Asheron's Call continued to be operated, even after Asheron's Call 2 was shuttered. In December 2012, Asheron's Call 2 was restarted, on a new server. The game closed on January 31, 2017.

== Updates ==
- As with most other MMORPGs of the era, Asheron's Call 2 was a subscription-based game, costing $12.95 USD/EUR per month to play. The Asheron's Call franchise was unique in providing complimentary monthly content updates or "events" that added new quests, skills, landmasses, monsters, gameplay dynamics and bug fixes to all subscribers. Epic storylines linked multiple episodes to form distinct "story arcs".
- A major expansion pack for Asheron's Call 2 titled Asheron's Call 2: Legions was released on May 4, 2005. It included a new playable character race, the mythical Empyreans, and a major new landmass, Knorr. Players who pre-ordered the expansion were granted access to a second new character race, the Drudge, at the time of the Legions launch. High-level gameplay was also revisited with the Hero 2.0 system and plentiful new content. The subsequent (and final) content update was one of the largest ever, featuring two new types of monsters, dozens of additional quests, as well as other content additions.

== Game setting ==
Both Asheron's Call and Asheron's Call 2 were set on the fictional planet of Auberean. The "Call" of Asheron's Call refers to the urge followed by people on several different "home worlds" to enter portals to Auberean, created by the Empyrean mage, Asheron Realaidain. Asheron's Call 2 took place following a major cataclysmic event on the planet, resulting in massive changes to the topography of one continent on the planet Dereth. The three races inhabiting the continent at the time of the cataclysm high-tailed it into the safety of shelters hidden in portal space until it was safe to emerge. The basic premise of Asheron's Call 2 was that the players represented people emerging from the shelters to reclaim the world their ancestors left behind. The three warring factions that brought about the original cataclysm were still present, and still fighting for power. In addition to these three warring factions, there were other, older and perhaps more powerful forces also fighting for control of Auberean's fate.

== Gameplay ==
Players chose a character that was one of three races: Isparians were humans from Ispar, one of the first races to answer Asheron's Call. Lugians came to Dereth in the same fashion as Isparians from a different home world, Tuu, and were (in the original game) quite hostile to Isparians. Tumeroks, or Tonks, also came to Dereth through Asheron's portals from their home world on Hazahtu, and were also originally treated as monsters by Isparians. These hostilities were worked out between the first game and the sequel, and in Asheron's Call 2: Fallen Kings the three races co-existed with conflict limited to those choosing player versus player content. Players that purchased the Legions expansion pack gained access to two additional races, Empyreans and Drudges.

One's race was the only limiting factor on the "class" or "profession" that could be played by player's character. In general terms, character classes were considered "damage dealers", "tanks", or "healers".

Characters could choose one of several specializations when they reached the 15th level. Characters also had the opportunity to choose to proceed un-specialized, though eventually the difficulty level of the content in the world made it important to specialize to continue advancement. For each level between 1 and 50, characters gained a credit that could be used to train skills used in combat. After reaching the 45th level, players could begin the "Hero Initiation" quest to become a Hero of Dereth and unlock character advancement beyond level 50. The level cap for Heroes of Dereth was 150. The character development system for Heroes was one of the major updates to the game released with the Legions expansion pack, but was open to all players, regardless of whether they purchased the expansion pack.

Levels were gained by completing activities that gave the character "experience points", or "XP", which was also used to increase the skill rating, or power, of each skill trained. Characters gained XP in a wide variety of ways: hunting monsters on a solo basis or with groups of other players, completing quests, or even just turning in items that can be traded for. Most quests (but not all) could be repeated for multiple rewards after the passage of time. There was significant variety in the quests offered in Asheron's Call 2: Fallen Kings: some centered on simply combating an overpopulation of a certain type of monster, some involved entering a dungeon or cave to destroy a powerful "boss" monster, some involved running errands for NPCs, or escorting NPCs to safety, in addition to the epic style quests that involved the major NPCs in the current or past story arcs. Quest rewards also ran the gamut: some offered temporary buffs or summonable pets to increase the character's power, some offered simply an XP reward, some offered gold, some offered weapons, armor, or trinkets, still others unlocked movie "vignettes" offering insight into the game's backstory.

Asheron's Call 2: Fallen Kings also had an extensive crafting system that operated almost completely independently of the level-based advancement system. In contrast to the XP system, the craft system placed no hard-set limitation on the number of skills one could master, but each skill was fairly narrow (for example, Tumerok Martial Weapons was one vocation, while Empyrean Armor was another). There were no level requirements to unlock craft skills: the craft skill alone was what mattered. For all but the most single-minded of crafters, players generally strove to master a single vocation, or to become adept enough in several to create items for a wide range of low- to mid-level characters. Players could craft weapons and armor up to level 100 that were highly sought after, and highly customizable. Enchantment effects could be extracted from weapons and armor generated by the treasure system.

Asheron's Call 2: Fallen Kings did not have a "faction" system by which the players improved (or worsened) their character's rapport with various NPC factions. The initial intent was to have Player Vs. Player (PvP) confined to certain areas of the game. This concept, however, was prone to exploits as many portals passed through these PvP assigned areas thus exposing players to ganking. This led developers to come up with a KvK (Kingdom Vs. Kingdom) system where players can instead chose to join one of three "kingdoms" (Order, Shadow, and Dominion) and could then participate in player-vs-player conflict, and gain access to some quest content that was centered on competition between the kingdoms, broadly referred to as "kingdom-vs-kingdom" content. As the players completed KvK quests and/or defeated characters of other kingdoms, they gained "kingdom points" which allowed them to train additional skills granted by their chosen Kingdom. These skills were unlocked in a strict hierarchy; players were not able to pick and choose which kingdom skills they could train. In addition, there were certain quests that could be completed to strengthen each Kingdom's fort (which had to be defended against predation by members of the opposing kingdom).

Player vs player combat in Asheron's Call 2: Fallen Kings was always consensual, and was not considered necessary for advancement of your character. For most servers, regions of the landscape were identified as "peaceful" or "conflict" zones, and PvP fighting was only allowed in conflict zones between members of opposing kingdoms. For Darktide, the "conflict server", PvP combat was possible in all regions of the world, and was not limited to conflict between different kingdoms. Quests that were not in some way related to increasing the power of one kingdom over the others generally avoided conflict regions on the map, thus allowing players who chose to avoid PvP combat to do so without limiting their activities significantly. Some of the main portals, though, passed through PVP areas forcing players to either go around them, or risk being ganked.

== Reception ==
Reception

Aggregate scores
Aggregator	Score
GameRankings	83.34% (29 reviews)
Metacritic	82/100 (22 reviews)

Asheron's Call 2 received generally positive reviews from critics. On the review aggregator GameRankings, the game received an average score of 83% based on 29 reviews. On Metacritic, the game received an average score of 82 out of 100, based on 22 reviews.

The game was nominated for GameSpot's annual "Best Graphics (Technical)" and "Best Role-Playing Game" awards among computer games, which went to Unreal Tournament 2003 and Neverwinter Nights, respectively. During the AIAS' 6th Annual Interactive Achievement Awards, Fallen Kings received nominations for "Massive Multiplayer/Persistent World Game of the Year" and "Outstanding Achievement in Visual Engineering".

== Shut down, relaunch and second shut down ==
Asheron's Call 2 failed to achieve enough subscribers to be viable and was shut down in December 2005. There were no plans to release the source code. In December 2012, Turbine relaunched the game starting with a beta for all subscribers of Asheron's Call.

By December 2016, Turbine was no longer developing MMORPGs, and the servers and account system were transitioned over to a newly formed studio Standing Stone Games, but the Asheron's Call IP remained with Turbine and Warner Bros. Interactive Entertainment. The game closed on January 31, 2017 (along with closing the original game as well).
