= Asheron's Call =

1999 video game

- Developer: Turbine Entertainment Software
- Publishers: Microsoft (1999–2000); Microsoft Game Studios (2000–2004); Turbine (2004–2010); Warner Bros. Interactive Entertainment (2010–2017)
- Producer: Dan Scherlis
- Designers: Toby Ragaini; Eri Izawa; Chris Pierson; Chris Foster
- Platform: Windows
- Release: November 2, 1999 – January 31, 2017 (17 years, 2 months, 4 weeks and 1 day)
- Genre: MMORPG
- Mode: Multiplayer

Asheron's Call (AC) is a discontinued fantasy massively multiplayer online role-playing game (MMORPG) for Microsoft Windows PCs, developed and published by Turbine Entertainment Software. Though it was developed by the Turbine team (with Microsoft's extensive assistance), it was published as a Microsoft title until 2004. The game was set on the island continent of Dereth and several surrounding smaller islands and archipelagos on the fictional planet of Auberean. The game was played in a large seamless 3D virtual world which could host thousands of players characters (or avatars) at a time.

Released on November 2, 1999, it was the third major MMORPG to be released, and was developed at the same time as those earlier games: Ultima Online and EverQuest. After initial success, its subscription numbers dropped as newer MMORPGs moved into the market. Its host servers remained online for over 17 years after the game's original launch.

Asheron's Call closed all its servers on January 31, 2017. Despite several attempts by the community to purchase or lease the intellectual property (IP) for the game, it closed at 12 EST.

== Gameplay ==
Set in a heroic fantasy world, Asheron's Call allowed players to create a character, or avatar, from one of three in-game races. The players could allocate a limited number of attribute points to attributes such as "Strength", "Coordination", and "Quickness" and select skills such as "Unarmed Combat", "War Magic", and "Melee Defense" for their character, with those base skills starting at a level determined by the character's attributes. Unlike many other games of the genre characters were not locked into a specific class, and could even reallocate previously selected skills to acquire other skills later in the game. Gameplay involved earning experience points ("XP") through a variety of activities, including engaging and defeating monsters in combat, fulfilling quests, and interacting with NPCs. Those earned experience points could be then invested to improve the character's abilities by spending them on attributes or skills. Additional skill points were awarded after the character reached certain levels, and these skill points could be used to acquire or train new skills. In addition to earning experience, questing and combat often yielded recoverable loot such as armor, weapons, health potions, and spell scrolls. Many types of loot could be improved or imbued with special spells and effects via Asheron's Call's "tinkering" crafting system.

With their monthly updates, including supplementary content, and occasional live "world events", Asheron's Call offered episodic narrative content, periodic new quests, and special events. The game's currency was the Pyreal. The world itself was large at over 1,300 square kilometres (500 sq mi). Unlike many other games in the genre, there were no zones or "instances" on the world's surface. This meant that players could cross the world on foot, without loading screens or invisible barriers, and any terrain that was seen in the distance was a real object in the world. The world was also dotted with a system of one-way portals which expedite travel. Some of the portals also led to intricate dungeons. Many of the dungeons were part of quests and contained unique treasures. The original magic system had specific formulae for each spell that the caster had to discover through trial and error. Magic was challenging and rare. This system of spell components was later phased out and replaced with a simpler system wherein magic casters could carry a "foci" for each of the magic schools they were trained in (creature, item, life and war) and a series of taper candles and scarabs. Each spell was learned from a scroll, either purchased or found as treasure. The old system was left in the game as an alternative.

Players could connect their avatars to "lifestones", where the avatar was to be resurrected if killed. Resurrected characters lost half their pyreals, one or more valuable items, and (temporarily) a certain percentage of their constitution—their primary and secondary strengths and characteristics—in what is known as a "vitae penalty". The players then brought their resurrected avatar to the place where the death occurred and recovered the item(s) from their own lingering "corpse". In player-killer ("PK") battles, the victor was allowed to take the dropped items from the vanquished. Regardless, the resulting "vitae penalty" was removed by gaining a modest amount of additional experience, or "XP". Player Killers ("PKs") were players who have chosen to change their characters' status in order to enable them to attack, or be attacked by, other PKs in Player vs Player combat. On most servers, players by default were prevented from attacking each other and they voluntarily changed their status to "PK". The Darktide server was a PK-only server that did not allow the option to turn off PK status. All players on Darktide were open to being killed by other players at any time, all the time. Asheron's Call featured a unique allegiance and fealty system that created formal links between players and rewarded cooperative play. A player of equal or lower level could swear allegiance to a player of the same or higher level, becoming a vassal of a patron. The patron earned a small percentage of bonus experience based on what the vassal made, while the vassal was motivated to seek a patron in exchange for money, items, game knowledge or protection. Players could also join in fellowships, temporarily splitting the experience they could gain amongst themselves.

Characters created many useful items using the Alchemy skill, such as oils that imbued missiles with elemental qualities (fire, acid, etc.) and gems that increased resistance to different types of damage. Alchemists could create infusions that applied to food items to increase the amount of stamina recovered, or recover health or mana. Alchemy was also used to brew health, magic, and stamina potions. Players could craft ammunition and cook foods such as cake, beer, nougat and rations. These were combined with oils to increase health, mana and stamina.

== Synopsis ==
The story of Asheron's Call spans across several worlds and thousands of years. The primary worlds in the story are Ispar, the world where the human characters in the game originated, and Auberean, the gigantic world where Dereth, a small island continent and the game's setting, is located. The game's monthly updates composed a story. The history of Auberean spans back 35,000 to 40,000 years. A race of beings known as the Empyreans dominated the world for most of its history. They were tall slender humanoids with lifespans of 1,000 years and were divided into several cultures including Falatacot, Dericost, Haebrous, and Yalaini. These cultures had many conflicts over the years, but eventually, in a world of many oceans and seas, the "Seaborne Empire" of the Yalaini became the dominant society. A Yalaini and member of the royal family, Asheron Realaidain, was born approximately 2,500 years prior to the time when the story starts for players, when they "arrive" in Dereth. Shortly after Asheron's birth, a war began between the Yalaini people and an army of Shadows, creatures of darkness and chaos, led by a demonic nemesis named Bael'Zharon, the Hopeslayer. The war with the Shadows lasted over 500 years and the Yalaini, pushed back from the rest of Auberean to the island of Dereth, were nearly defeated. As a last resort, Asheron and the Yalaini council of five mages were able to stave off their doom and eventually defeat Bael'Zharon through the arts of planar magic - the kind of magic pertaining to the planes of existence and the space in between them known as portal space. Using a crystal array, the council was able to seal Bael'Zharon in another plane. The sealing caused a great explosion, and all members of the council were killed, but Asheron survived, protected by Falatacot Blood rites performed by his mother and a Falatacot-blooded "witch" named Adja just prior to the explosion. With Bael'zharon banished, the Shadow armies retreated and the Yalaini people were saved.

Asheron continued to research planar magic. Eventually, the Yalaini mastered this art of magic and were able to use it to create portals from one location to another. They used these portals to explore all of Auberean, and eventually began exploring other worlds, including the home world of humans known as Ispar. In their explorations, the Yalaini came to a world dominated by numerous giant insect species. One of these species were known as the Olthoi, which killed one of the explorers. The Emperor of the Yalaini demanded that Olthoi be brought back for research and possibly used as weapons for the empire. This action, along with the mistake of a wizard named Gaerlan, would be the doom of the Yalaini. The Olthoi rebelled and the Yalaini lost the war. After 100 years, all surviving Yalaini were pushed back to the island of Dereth, and almost 80 years later, one single Olthoi Queen arrived on the island and began to breed. With their last place of safety invaded, the remaining Yalaini retreated from the world. Asheron and his disciples cast a powerful planar magic spell known as The Sundering, which sent the Yalaini people into portal space in a state of stasis. After sending his disciples in as well, Asheron retreated to the last place of safety - his castle on a small island - and alone began working on a way to defeat the Olthoi.

More than 500 years had passed when the first humans arrived on Dereth. These humans were quickly enslaved by the Olthoi. Many tried to escape, but few survived. One group did, led by Elysa Strathelar and Thorsten Cragstone. They rescued some others and found an Empyrean catacomb, which came to be known as the Underground City. An ancient text in the city told of Asheron and his castle's location. Their leaders left for Asheron, who gave them a poison to kill the Olthoi Queen, which they did at the cost of Cragstone's life. The Olthoi retreated and the humans began to thrive.

Players originally entered Dereth as one of three "Isparian" races: the Aluvians, the Sho, and the Gharu'ndim, based roughly on medieval Britain, Japan, and Egypt. The second expansion added Viamontians (based on medieval France) as a playable race. Later updates added former enemy races Shadows, Tumerok, (Empyrean) Undead, Lugian, and Gearknights, alongside native Empyreans. Olthoi were also added as a special PVP only race.

== Development ==
Asheron's Call was developed by Turbine Entertainment Software and published by Microsoft. It had a multimillion-dollar development budget of $4 million. It was designed by Toby Ragaini (lead designer), Chris Foster, Eri Izawa, and Chris Pierson. The development team consisted of 30+ full-time developers, including 6 artists, 4 game designers, 15 software engineers and 5 QA testers. Asheron's Call was technically innovative for its time. It did not use zoning, a technique of partitioning the game world into zones that ran on different computers on a cluster. This caused delay when moving between zones. Instead Asheron's Call had a single seamless world. It used dynamic load balancing to determine which computer in the cluster controlled location area. If one area became overpopulated, the sluggish control of part of that location would pass to another computer with a lighter load. Critical development software included Microsoft Visual C++ 5.0, Visual SourceSafe 5.0, Lightwave 5.5, and Photoshop 4.0 Asheron's Call used Microsoft SQL Server for persistent game data. The original Asheron's Call client allowed computers to use either 3D or software graphics acceleration. The modern client required a DirectX 9.0 compatible video adapter w/ hardware T&L.

Asheron's Call took 40 months plus 8 months of beta testing to complete. It was originally scheduled to ship during the fourth quarter of 1997. Production was delayed over a year because of the inexperience of the production team. The finished product contained approximately 2 million lines of code. There were six servers available at launch. Asheron's Call launched nine months after EverQuest on November 2, 1999. In the United States, it sold 57,143 copies and earned revenues of $2.64 million by early 2000. Asheron's Call had 80,000 players by the end of its first year. By the end of 2000 its subscription rate was third behind Ultima Online and EverQuest, with 90,000 subscribers from 200,000 box sales. While neither Turbine nor Microsoft have been forthcoming in releasing exact subscription counts, it is believed that Asheron's Call peaked in popularity in early 2002 at about 120,000 accounts and has since dropped to below 10,000. Dark Age of Camelot had 200,000 subscribers in May 2002, taking Asheron's Call's spot as third most popular virtual world.

== Reception ==
Reception

Aggregate scores
Aggregator	Score
GameRankings	81%
Metacritic	81/100

Michael Wolf for Next Generation gave the game three stars out of five, and called it a deep, complex game, but not as easy or fun as EverQuest.

Asheron's Call received generally positive reviews from critics. On the review aggregator GameRankings, the game received an average score of 81% based on 26 reviews. On Metacritic, the game received an average score of 81 out of 100 based on 15 reviews.

Asheron's Call appealed to explorers and people who appreciated story arcs.

Awards included:

- CNET's Gamecenter Best RPG award for 1999.
- 3rd Annual Interactive Achievement Awards: won "Computer Adventure/Role-Playing Game of the Year", along with a nomination for "Online Game of the Year" (lost to EverQuest).
- 4th Annual Interactive Achievement Awards: nominated for "Massive Multiplayer/Persistent World", "PC Game of the Year", and "Game of the Year".
- 5th Annual Interactive Achievement Awards: the expansion Dark Majesty received a nomination in the "Massive Multiplayer/Persistent World" category.
- Gameindustry.com: 1999 Best All Around Game
- Gamezilla: Editor's Choice for Best Online/Multiplayer Title 1999
- Gamersvoice: 1999 Gamer's Choice Award in the category of "Best Online/Multiplayer Game"
- MPOGD: Game of the Month February 2003

The editors of Computer Gaming World nominated Asheron's Call for their 1999 "Role-Playing Game of the Year" award, which ultimately went to Planescape: Torment.

== Post-release ==
A first expansion, Dark Majesty, was released in 2001. In 2002, the full-fledged sequel Asheron's Call 2: Fallen Kings was released, which would be closed in 2005 but then reactivated in 2012. In December 2003, Turbine purchased the rights to the Asheron's Call franchise from Microsoft and assumed full responsibility for content development, customer service, billing and marketing in 2004. A second expansion, Throne of Destiny - which included a graphics upgrade, new player race and new landmass - was released on July 18, 2005. In addition to the expansion packs, the in-game story was advanced by monthly updates, which introduced new quests and gameplay dynamics as part of the subscription package. Both expansions included the full version of the game. Asheron's Call franchise was unique in providing complimentary monthly content updates and "events" that added new quests, skills, landmasses, monsters, gameplay dynamics and bug fixes for all subscribers. Storylines linked multiple episodes to form distinct "story arcs".

Asheron's Call originally charged a monthly subscription fee, which was eventually discontinued. The title then became free to play and in maintenance mode. No further content would be released and there were plans to provide players with the ability to host their own servers. The last content patch was released on March 4, 2014, and after that the patches were limited to maintenance and bug fixes.

== Closure ==
Asheron's Call spent over two years in maintenance mode with no updates, although the occasional server and account issues were dealt with by Turbine staff. The largest event to occur in this time was the chat being permanently disabled on the Darktide server in order to prevent ingame abuse.

By December 2016, Turbine was no longer developing MMORPGs, and the servers and account system were transitioned over to a newly formed studio called Standing Stone Games, but the Asheron's Call IP remained with Turbine and their owner Warner Bros. Interactive Entertainment. The game closed on January 31, 2017.

New account creation was disabled in December 2016, although players with an account were free to keep playing the game. The closure not only affected Asheron's Call, but also its sequel. In 2012, Asheron's Call 2: Fallen Kings was resurrected, but would also close on January 31, 2017. Shortly after the servers closed, the website and forums were taken down along with the official Facebook page.

== See also ==
- Dungeons & Dragons Online
- The Lord of the Rings Online
