= ZooMumba =

2010 video game

- Developer: Bigpoint
- Publisher: Bigpoint
- Platform: Web browser
- Release: 19 August 2010
- Genre: Simulation
- Mode: Single-player with multiplayer interaction

ZooMumba was a free-to-play zoo simulator developed and published by Bigpoint where players took up the responsibility of creating and maintaining a zoo. Players started with an empty piece of land to transform into a successful zoo. Players had a variety of objects and tools at their disposal to transform the empty piece of land into one of the world’s best zoos. As of July 2018, there were over 17,150,000 registered users of the game, and it was available in 26 different languages.

== Gameplay ==
The color palette for ZooMumba was very bright and vibrant so that it gave off a fun and family oriented art style. Much of the interactivity in the game revolved around the upkeep of your animals and zoo, making sure that the animals were well taken care of and that your zoo was kept clean. The mouse was the primary control and could be solely used to navigate through the game. "ZooMumba offers a friendly community and intuitive gameplay, making it a pleasure to play for experienced or inexperienced players alike."

When the player first started out, Habitats had to be laid out for the animals to live in. All animals could live in any habitat, but certain habitats provided bonuses to certain animals. Once the Habitat had been built, the player could then populate the Habitat with animals to live in. Having a male and female of each animal allowed the player to breed or adopt animal babies and "they are really cute and adorable, too".

== Closure ==
On 26 November 2020, it was announced that the game would be shut down on 31 December 2020. On that day support of Adobe Flash Player, which enabled Zoomumba to run, was ended and, according to Team Zoomumba, maintenance costs for a game like Zoomumba didn't justify a transition to a different platform.
