= Mouse: P.I. for Hire =

2026 video game

- Developer: Fumi Games
- Publisher: PlaySide Studios
- Director: Michał Rostek
- Producer: Maciej Krzemień
- Designer: Łukasz Błaszczyk
- Programmers: Hubert Mattusch; Artur Sołek; Radosław Walaszczyk
- Artists: Mateusz Kozela; Grzegorz Pamuła
- Composer: Patryk Scelina
- Engine: Unity
- Platforms: Nintendo Switch 2; PlayStation 5; Windows; Xbox Series X/S
- Release: April 16, 2026
- Genre: First-person shooter
- Mode: Single-player

Mouse: P.I. for Hire is a first-person shooter game developed by Fumi Games and published by PlaySide Studios. The game was released April 16, 2026 for Nintendo Switch 2, PlayStation 5, Windows, and Xbox Series X/S platforms. Set in a world inhabited by anthropomorphic mice in the 1930s, players control Jack Pepper (Troy Baker) who must investigate a mysterious case across the fictional town of Mouseburg. The game received generally favorable reviews.

== Gameplay ==
Mouse: P.I. for Hire is a first-person shooter. Gameplay includes both investigative sections where Jack has to find clues and solve puzzles, and combat sections where he engages in arena shootouts wielding a variety of guns, melee weapons, and gadgets.

== Plot ==
=== Setting ===
Mouse: P.I. for Hire takes place in a city called Mouseburg in 1934 after a war in the Old World over an event called "The Quite Big Affair". The city is mostly inhabited by anthropomorphic mice, as well as other rodents such as rats and shrews, with the latter being seen as a lesser kind of rodent due to their short stature. They used to have their own town called Shrewthicket, but rising tensions led to it being destroyed.

The city mimics a 1930s styled New York, with cheese prohibitions, film industries, and city corruption. Mouseburg is not shy of crime rates, as there are many criminal operations involved, such as shrew violence, organized crime, and "cheeselegging." While cheese can be eaten as normal, it can also be consumed in a melted state like liquor, and blue cheese and powdered cheese are considered to be the same as drugs.

=== Characters ===
Mouse: P.I. for Hire is centered around a series of cases being investigated by Jack Pepper (voiced by Troy Baker), an anthropomorphic, hardboiled mouse detective, as well as a former war hero and police officer. His office resides next to a bar called "Little & Big," owned by John Brown (voiced by Fred Tatasciore), a hard-working shrew who used to live in Shrewthicket before it was destroyed. Also residing nearby is Tammy Tumbler (voiced by Camryn Grimes), a young female mouse mechanic who usually helps Jack upgrade his weapons. Jack has looked after Tammy ever since he arrested her step-father during his cop years when she was 13. Due to Jack's gambling, he has to work on small and cheap cases, usually depending on journalist Wanda Fuller (voiced by Florian Claire) for any intel and leads.

Steve Bandel (voiced by James T. Alexander) served with Jack in the war and became a stage magician after the war's end. Jack has some anger towards Steve, as he caught him in some illegal activity during his cop years, but looked the other way, which was one of the reasons why Jack left the force. Steve's former stage assistant, mouse actress Betty Lynch, died recently. The police ruled out foul play, but Vivian McCarthy (voiced by Rhiannon Moushall), another mouse actress and a friend of Betty, believes someone was involved in her death. In addition, Jack and Steve's former commander-now politician Cornelius Stilton (voiced by Frank Todaro) runs against Milford Soyer (voiced by Ewan Bailey), the leader of a new and rising political party called the Big Mouse Party, to become mayor.

=== Story ===
Wanda summons Jack to investigate Steve's recent disappearance during his latest performance. While investigating, Jack saves Cornelius from an attempted assassination. Out of gratitude, Cornelius gives Jack Steve's address as to where his lab might be. Inside, Jack finds it overrun by cultists and notes about sidestepping a project to "The Unknown" after his former show assistant Betty's resignation and death. Jack uncovers Steve's ties to an Old World scientist called Professor von Harzer, also known as Ze Professor (also voiced by Bailey).

Cornelius goes back to Jack's office and requests his aid uncovering a recent rumor of missing shrews, the minority populace of Mouseburg, and how the police might be involved. Jack soon uncovers corrupt cops gathering shrews and transporting them underground using old cheeselegging routes. Digging deeper, he finds out that actual cheeseleggers were involved and working with the cops, only to be later disposed of like trash. He eventually has a run-in with MiceGuffin MacLeod (also voiced by Alexander), a Scottish high-ranking member of the Mouseburg Police Department sent to wipe out the cheeseleggers and anyone else involved (including Jack) to ensure that they can't reveal anything about the shrew-trafficking operation. With quick-thinking and strategy, Jack is able to defeat MacLeod.

In between cases, Vivian has requested Jack's services in uncovering Betty's death, to which she believes foul play was involved by her old studio Tinsel Bros. While investigating the studio she used to work, Jack finds Betty's trailer emptied, but finds a photo of her next to Soyer. Jack believes that the two got close thanks to BMP spokesperson Miles Curd (also voiced by Bailey). Upon questioning Miles, he has Jack suspect he was once close to Betty as well, but is confused why he now thinks little of her. After investigating, Jack concludes that Betty was a socialite who acquired sensitive information and inadvertently spread it to the public. This attracted the attention of the mob, who ended up mugging Betty. Eventually, Miles is murdered, and after further investigation, Jack learns that Vivian is the culprit behind the deed, as she mistakenly assumed that Miles was Betty's killer. Jack attempts to locate and arrest Vivian in Tinsel Avenue, but she ultimately evades capture.

Continuing on with the shrew-trafficking investigation, Jack uncovers the mastermind behind it all: Captain Simms (also voiced by Tatasciore), a highly-celebrated police officer and a former mentor of Jack's who is acquainted with the BMP. Ashamed at how far his former mentor has fallen, Jack is forced to dispose of him for good.

In the Curdsville Nuthouse, Jack finds shrews being held captive and is exposed to a gas that makes him hallucinate. Jack encounters a talking brain named Jar-Head (also voiced by Alexander), who orders Jack to "fuel" him with rodent blood. Jack complies and discovers a portal to the Unknown, a dream-like dimension. Deep inside, he finds Steve, who made himself disappear to hide from the mob and Ze Scientists. Steve reveals he had been searching for the Unknown after the war, and through Betty's connections teamed up with Ze Scientists after learning they shared the same goals. Upon realizing ink was needed for the portal, Ze Professor suggested shrews and Steve initially agreed with this, hiring the cultists to help. However, he soon realized the brutality the shrews faced for his plans and, unable to turn from Ze Scientists, decided to hide in the Unknown. When Steve reveals Ze Scientists are trying to reopen the portal, he begs Jack to stop them and destroy Ze Professor's U-boat. Jack agrees and, with Steve wanting to stay in the Unknown, parts ways with him.

Jack and Tammy confront Ze Professor head on in his submarine. After defeating Ze Professor, Jack grabs a piece of evidence stating that the BMP brought the scientists from the Old World themselves. With all the clues laid out, Jack confirms that the Big Mouse Party was involved in all three cases. They wanted to get rid of the shrews and take their homes and land for free housing, so they paid the cops to arrest the shrews and hired the old cheeseleggers to transport them. They then allowed Steve and Ze Scientists to do what they want with the captured shrews, effectively getting rid of them. Once Betty heard parts of the plan and spread it as gossip, the BMP soon heard and paid the mob to silence her and have the cops cover it up. Jack plans to release his evidence, only for the office to be burned and the evidence stolen by the BMP.

Jack goes into a drunken spiral following the damage of his office and loss of his evidence, but is contacted by Steve through a mirror. He tells Jack that he hid tape recordings of the BMP's conversations in his manor just in case, and lets Jack go to retrieve them. Jack receives the tape and broadcasts it to expose Soyer and his plans. Soyer attempts to escape in his blimp while taking John as hostage, but Jack, with Tammy's help, manages to defeat Soyer and save John. Soyer is knocked out and sent away in cuffs, while Cornelius rises in the polls for mayor.

== Release ==
Mouse: P.I. for Hire game was developed by Polish company Fumi Games and published by Australian company PlaySide Studios. Following its announcement in 2024, the game was originally scheduled to be released in 2025, but was delayed to 2026 due to changes in development and final polishing. It was released on April 16, 2026 for Nintendo Switch 2, PlayStation 5, Windows and Xbox Series X/S.

Physical editions of the game were released on July 10, 2026. A standard edition was released for PlayStation 5 and Nintendo Switch 2, on disc and game card, respectively. A deluxe edition called the "Mouseburg Edition" was released for all supported platforms; in addition to the game, this edition includes a 7" vinyl record, a comic book, a poster, trading cards and postcards.

== Reception ==
Reception

Aggregate scores
Aggregator	Score
Metacritic	(NS2) 75/100 (PC) 80/100 (PS5) 77/100 (XSXS) 82/100
OpenCritic	85% recommend (Note: Based on 167 reviews)

Review scores
Publication	Score
Destructoid	9.5/10
Game Informer	8/10
GameSpot	8/10
Giant Bomb	3/5
IGN	6/10
PC Gamer (US)	86/100
Push Square	8/10
Shacknews	8/10
TheBigBois	8/10

Mouse: P.I. for Hire received "generally favorable" reviews, according to review aggregator website Metacritic. OpenCritic reported that 85% of critics recommended it.

By May 2026, the game had sold 730,000 copies worldwide.

=== Awards ===
The game was nominated for "Action and Adventure Game" at the TIGA Games Industry Awards 2026, which went to Crimson Desert. It was also nominated for "Best Game Trailer" and "Best Indie Game" at the 2026 Golden Joystick Awards, both of which went to Resident Evil Requiem and Valheim; and won the award for "Visual Art" at the 2026 CEEGA Awards. The game also earned a nomination for "Best Art Direction" at The Game Awards 2026.
