= Game of Thrones: War for Westeros =

Upcoming video game

- Cover
- Developer: PlaySide
- Publisher: PlaySide
- Director: Ryan McMahon
- Series: Game of Thrones
- Platform: Windows
- Release: 2027
- Genre: Real-time strategy
- Modes: Single-player, multiplayer

Game of Thrones: War for Westeros is an upcoming real-time strategy video game developed and published by PlaySide Studios. It is based on the television series Game of Thrones. The game was announced on June 6, 2025, at the Summer Game Fest, and is set to be released on Windows in 2027.

== Gameplay ==
Game of Thrones: War for Westeros is based on the television series Game of Thrones, and allows players to take control of the armies of House Stark, House Lannister, House Targaryen, or the Night King, featuring various hero characters such as Jon Snow, Jaime Lannister, and Daenerys Targaryen. The game also allows players to control different types of forces, such as infantry, dragons, and giants, that can be used in single-player or multiplayer gameplay, with elements of the game set to match the different playable armies. The game is set to include a campaign mode, War for Westeros, as well as a skirmish mode.

== Marketing and release ==
Game of Thrones: War for Westeros is set to be released in early 2027, for Windows. The game was originally set to be released in 2026. In August 2026, it was announced that the Game of Thrones: War for Westeros gameplay reveal would take place at Gamescom on August 25, 2026.

== See also ==
- List of A Song of Ice and Fire video games
- Game of Thrones franchise
