= Game of Thrones: Kingsroad =

2025 video game

- Cover
- Developer: Netmarble Neo
- Publisher: Netmarble
- Series: Game of Thrones
- Platforms: Android; iOS; Microsoft Windows
- Release: May 21, 2025
- Genre: Role-playing
- Modes: Single-player, multiplayer

Game of Thrones: Kingsroad is a 2025 role-playing video game video game developed and published by Netmarble. It is based on the television series Game of Thrones. The game was announced on December 12, 2024, at the The Game Awards 2024, and was released on May 21, 2025.

== Gameplay ==
Game of Thrones: Kingsroad is based on the television series Game of Thrones, and allows players to choose from three classes, the knight, the sellsword, or the assassin, and take control of a character who is from House Tyre, featuring various characters from the series such as Jon Snow. The game also features various locations from the series such as Castle Black, King's Landing, and Highgarden.

== Development and release ==
Game of Thrones: Kingsroad was developed and published by Netmarble, which had developed video games based on well-known intellectual properties like Solo Leveling and The Seven Deadly Sins. For Game of Thrones, the company decided to create an open world action role-playing game because the development team thought what the fandom wanted the most was to explore its world with the characters. It was directed by Jang Hyeonil.

The game was announced at G-Star 2024 with a gameplay trailer. It was released on May 21, 2025, for Android and iOS, and Microsoft Windows. The game had released in early access on March 26, 2025. In June 2025, released an update to Game of Thrones: Kingsroad that added The Crow's Nest and its surrounding areas as well as new quests, a raid mode, and more.

== See also ==
- List of A Song of Ice and Fire video games
