= Deepolis =

2008 video game

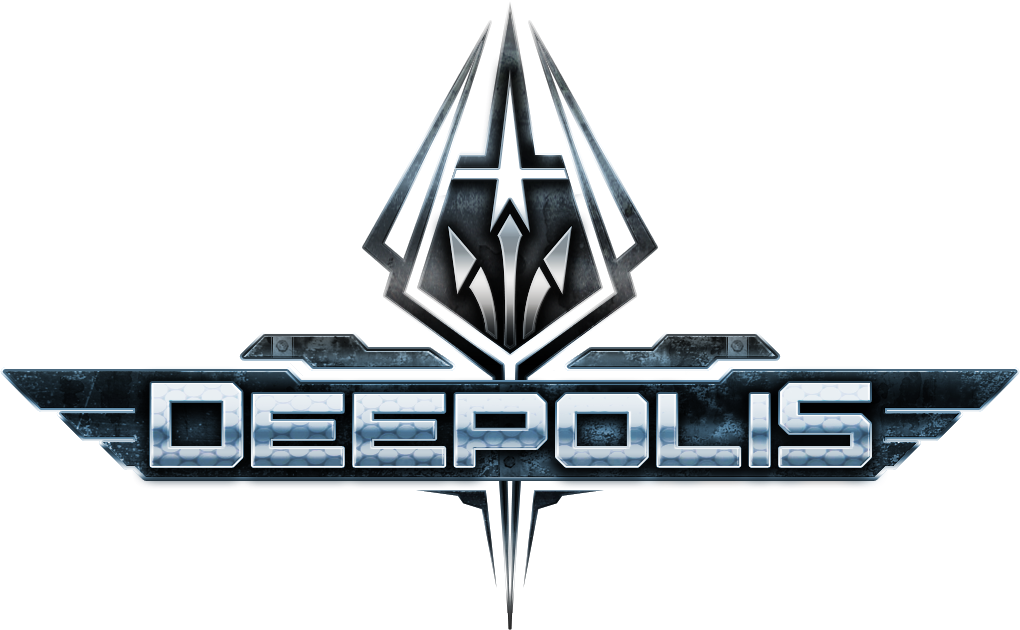
- Logo of Deepolis
- Developer: Bigpoint
- Publisher: Bigpoint
- Platform: Web browser
- Release: 2008
- Genre: MMO browser game
- Mode: Multiplayer

Deepolis was a 3D online browser based game, developed by Bigpoint. Released on 17 December 2008, the game is available in 20 languages (as of November 2009).

Deepolis was nominated for the Deutscher Entwicklerpreis award in the category "Best browser game in 2009" and for the KGC Award 2009.

The game won the Red dot design award (Communication Design) 2009 in the category "Digital Games".

On 1 February 2020, the final Deepolis servers went offline.

== Game play ==
In Deepolis, the player takes on the role of under water admiral commanding a submarine in a three-dimensional underwater world, with the aim of completing quests and sinking other players and NPCs. As a result, the player collects experience points (EP) and advances upwards through the levels.

The game optionally supports player clans, both for PVP and PVE play.

It is possible to win a maximum amount of 10,000 Euro in a tournament. All players enter a Jackpot battle combat competition with other players on a special Jackpot battle map. One can collect their Jackpot Euros in the game by collecting flotsam. If one does not collect the whole 10,000 Euros, they will get their collected amount of Jackpot Euros if they are able to win the Jackpot battle.

== Costs ==
Although the game is free, one can buy extra subs, weapons, equipment or ammo for "Helix". Helix is a game currency that is purchased with real currency. It can also be acquired by completing special quests, sinking NPCs or collecting it. Along with Helix, there is a second currency, called "Cel". It is earned by collecting flotsam, sinking NPCs, and trading commodities between stations throughout the game world. In addition to purchasing in-game items with Cel, one can bid Cel in the auctions in the virtual Marina. Thus it is possible to obtain elite items without paying for them with real currency.

If one wants to pay less for sub repair or obtain further additional advantages in the game, one can buy Premium for six or twelve months. All players can also buy extra packages in the game. As of July 2011, A new sub design was released in the game. These designs are for elite subs in Scion, Naut, and Jafnhar.

== Technology ==
The Deepolis client was based entirely on Adobe Flash. It was playable in every available browser that supports Adobe Flash.
