= A Clash of Kings (disambiguation) =

A Clash of Kings is the second novel in George R. R. Martin's fantasy series A Song of Ice and Fire.

A Clash of Kings or Clash of Kings may also refer to:

== Common uses ==
- Clash of Kings, a 2014 mobile massively multiplayer online strategy game developed by Elex Tech and completely unrelated to A Song of Ice and Fire or any other George R. R. Martin work

== Other uses ==
- A Clash of Kings (board game), a 2004 expansion pack for the 2003 strategy board game A Game of Thrones
- A Clash of Kings (comics), a 2017 comic book adaptation of George R. R. Martin's eponymous fantasy novel
- Clash of Kings (Timemaster), a 1984 role-playing game adventure

== See also ==
- A Game of Thrones (disambiguation)
- War of succession, the political and martial clashes of becoming kings
- Power politics, the political and martial power clashes played by kings
- Choque-Rei (English: Kings' Clash) the Palmeiras and São Paulo soccer rivalry in Brazil
