= Battles of Westeros =

Board game

Battles of Westeros is a 2010 strategic wargame set in George R.R. Martin’s A Song of Ice and Fire universe. It was designed by Robert A. Kouba and published by Fantasy Flight Games.

== Awards ==
Battles of Westeros has received the following awards:

- 2011 JoTa Best Wargame Critic Award
- 2011 JoTa Best Wargame Audience Award
- 2011 JoTa Best 2-Player Board Game Critic Award
- 2011 JoTa Best 2-Player Board Game Audience Award
- 2011 International Gamers Award - General Strategy: Two-players Nominee
- 2010 Golden Geek Best Wargame Nominee
- 2010 Golden Geek Best 2-Player Board Game Nominee

== Expansions ==
- Battles of Westeros: Wardens of the West (2010)
- Battles of Westeros: Wardens of the North (2010)
- Battles of Westeros: Lords of the River (2011)
- Battles of Westeros: Tribes of the Vale (2011)
- Battles of Westeros: Brotherhood Without Banners (2011)
- Battles of Westeros: House Baratheon Army Expansion (2012)
