= Yoozoo Games =

Chinese video game company

- Native name: 游族网络有限股份公司
- Romanized name: Yóuzú Wǎngluò Yǒuxiàn Gǔfèn Gōngsī
- Type: Limited partnership
- Traded as: SZSE: 002174
- Industry: Video games
- Founded: 2009
- Founder: Lin Qi
- Headquarters: Shanghai
- Revenue: USD 453 million (2019)
- Number of employees: 2000
- Website: global.yoozoo.com gtarcade.com

Yoozoo Games
- Simplified Chinese: 游族网络股份有限公司
- Traditional Chinese: 游族網絡股份有限公司
Transcriptions
Standard Mandarin
- Hanyu Pinyin: Yóuzú Wǎngluò Gǔfènyǒuxiàngōngsī

Yoozoo Games (trading name of Youzu Interactive) is a video game developer and publisher of browser and mobile games, primarily massively multiplayer online games (MMORPG), in Asia, Europe and North America. The company was founded in 2009 by Lin Qi, created GTArcade and started publishing its titles overseas in 2013, and was listed on the Shenzhen stock exchange in 2014.

Many of its games obtain revenue from the sale of virtual goods and the majority are developed in-house. Its most popular international game is a browser-based MMORPG titled League of Angels. This game began as a stand-alone game for the Chinese market but later was adapted for a growing international market. The game was released in English-speaking countries in late 2013 and now has over 300 servers in operation.

Its headquarters are in Xuhui District, Shanghai.

== History ==
Lin Qi, also known as Titan Lin, was a Chinese entrepreneur and founder of Youzu Interactive. The company, which produces games for both its home markets and overseas markets, was acquired by Susino Umbrella in an all-stock deal in 2014. Lin Qi owned approximately 100.9 million shares of Youzu, which were last valued at $2.2 billion, according to Wealth-X. On December 25, 2020, Lin Qi died at age 39. He was allegedly poisoned on December 16 by one of his colleagues, Xu Yao, who was sentenced to death in 2024 for the murder and executed in 2026.

Youzu Games HongKong Limited was founded in early 2013 in Hong Kong and focuses on localizing and operating massively multiplayer games in North America and Europe. In 2016, Youzu bought German online game developer Bigpoint for $89.7 million.

== Video games ==
=== League of Angels ===
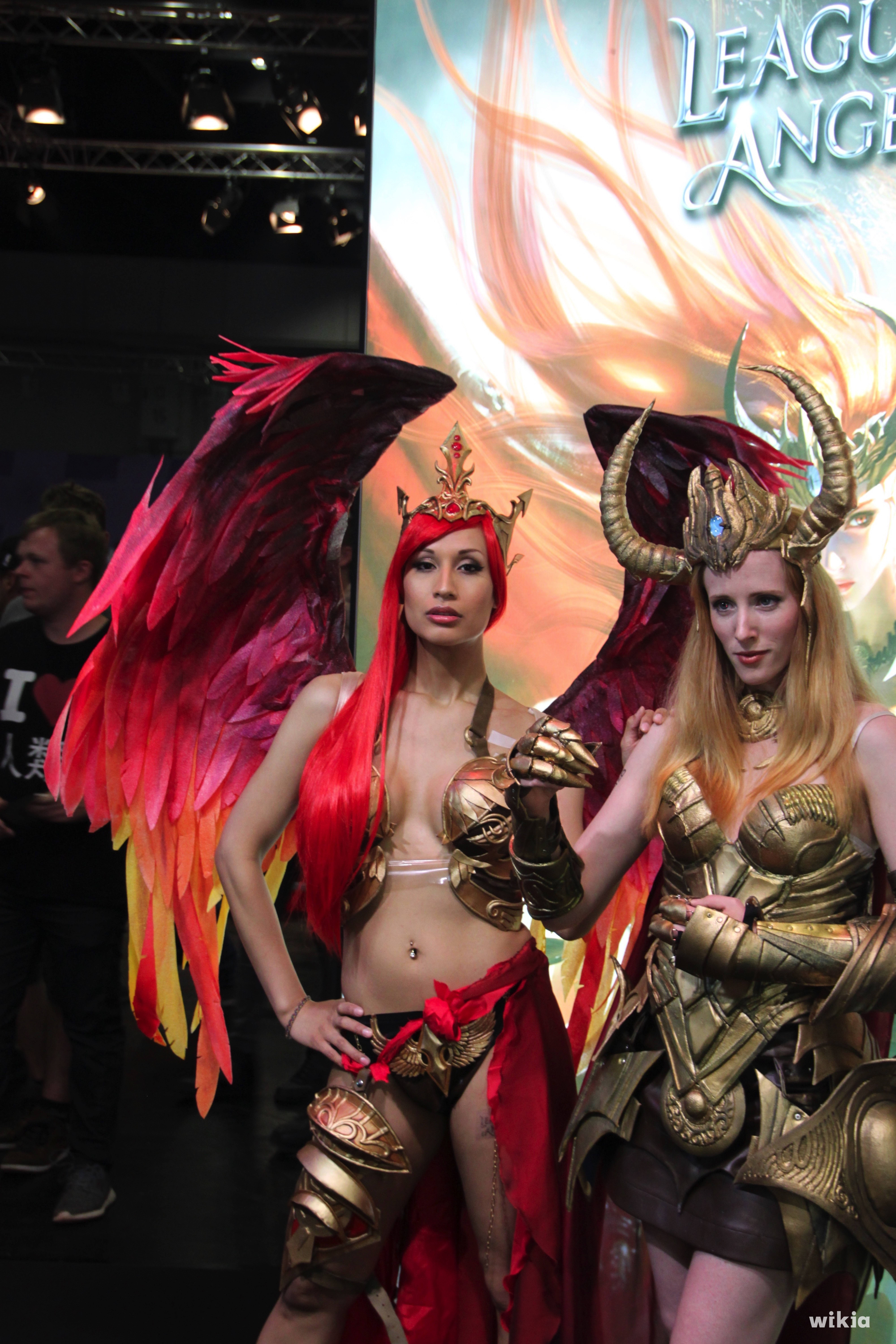
League of Angels II promotion at Gamescom 2016

League of Angels (LoA) is an MMORPG released in December 2013 by Youzu Interactive. LoA's China release took place in July 2013, with the North American version following shortly in December of that year. League of Angels was chosen in December 2014 as one of the best new games on Facebook for that year.

League of Angels II (also League of Angels 2 or LoA2) is the 2016 sequel to the 2013 game. Its impending release was announced on March 15, and a 5,000-player closed beta ran from March 24 to 31, then replaced with an open beta. It launched on April 8 in North America, and two weeks later there was a free gold giveaway to promote playing. The game's European release occurred on May 19. The game's first multi-language release (English, French, German, simplified Chinese and traditional Chinese) was released on May 26, then in Portuguese and Spanish on June 23.

=== Infinity Kingdom ===
Infinity Kingdom (Abbreviated as IK) is a freemium cartoon mobile strategy video game, released on January 28, 2021, for both iOS and Android. The Android version was released on Google Play, Huawei Appgallery, and Samsung Galaxy Store. An APK is also available on the Infinity Kingdom website. A PC version was released on Steam on July 2, 2021. The game is currently available in English, French, German, Indonesian, Italian, Polish, Portuguese, Russian, Spanish, Turkish, Thai, Vietnamese, Simplified Chinese and Traditional Chinese. For the future, Korean, Japanese, Arabic and Bengali translations are planned.

=== Other games ===
- Drakensang Online
- DarkOrbit
- Fire Raiders
- Knight's Fable – browser-based MMORPG May 2014
- Magerealm – browser-based MMORPG December 2015
- Legacy of Discord
- Game of Thrones: Winter Is Coming
