= WB Games Boston =

American video game developer

Warner Bros. Games Boston
- Formerly: CyberSpace, Inc. (1994–1995); Turbine Entertainment Software (1995–2005); Turbine Inc. (2005–2018)
- Type: Subsidiary
- Industry: Video games
- Founded: April 1994; 32 years ago
- Founder: Jeremy Gaffney; Jonathan Monsarrat; Kevin Langevin; Timothy Miller
- Headquarters: Needham, Massachusetts, U.S.
- Products: Asheron's Call; Dungeons & Dragons Online; The Lord of the Rings Online
- Parent: Warner Bros. Games (2010–present)

Warner Bros. Games Boston (formerly Turbine Inc., then Turbine Entertainment Software Corp., and originally CyberSpace, Inc.) is an American video game developer. The studio is best known for its massive multiplayer online role-playing games, Asheron's Call, Dungeons & Dragons Online, and The Lord of the Rings Online. In April 2010, Warner Bros. Games Boston was acquired by Warner Bros. Home Entertainment for $160 million and became a part of Warner Bros. Interactive Entertainment (now Warner Bros. Games), the video game division of Warner Bros. Entertainment.

== History ==
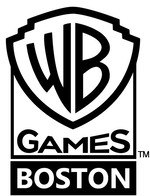
Logo of WB Games Boston from 2018 to 2019.

Turbine was founded as CyberSpace, Inc. in April 1994 by Jeremy Gaffney, Jonathan Monsarrat, Kevin Langevin, and Timothy Miller, some of whom were students from the Artificial Intelligence Lab at Brown University. In 1995, the company was based in Monsarrat's mother's house with 12 staff members, with Jonathan Monsarrat as CEO and CTO. They found an office in Providence, Rhode Island but later moved to Westwood, Massachusetts to better take advantage of the software engineers coming out of Boston's colleges. As CEO, Monsarrat used free food and office pranks to keep staff motivated.

In 1995, the company changed its name to Turbine Entertainment Software Corp. In 1999, the company's first game, Asheron's Call, was released. It was notable for being the third 3D MMORPG, following the launch of Meridian 59 and then EverQuest. Its most notable feature, designed by Monsarrat, was a "loyalty" system giving new and experienced players incentives to work together. The Olthoi was the first monster developed for Asheron's Call, designed by Joe Angell.

After Asheron's Call, the company went on to make a sequel, Asheron's Call 2: Fallen Kings, which came out in 2002 (just after the first Asheron's Call expansion). However, after only one expansion, Asheron's Call 2: Fallen Kings shut down in 2005. In the same year, Turbine Entertainment Software Corp. changed its name to Turbine, Inc.

In 2006, Turbine released Dungeons & Dragons Online: Stormreach. Early reception was positive, but the game was criticised for poor solo play. In 2007, Turbine released The Lord of the Rings Online: Shadows of Angmar, which got positive reviews and was seen as a needed boost for the company.

In 2009, Dungeons and Dragons Online was suffering a low playerbase; in an attempt to save the game, Turbine replaced the traditional monthly subscription model with a free to play one. In 2010, Turbine also moved The Lord of the Rings Online (which was then on its second expansion) to a free-to-play model. In the same year, Turbine was purchased by Warner Bros. Home Entertainment for $160 million.

In 2012, Turbine brought back Asheron's Call 2: Fallen Kings.

The game's development of Infinite Crisis ended on August 14, 2015.

The company was hit with layoffs for three years consecutively starting from 2014. While Turbine's focus was shifted to develop free-to-play mobile games by Warner Bros. In 2016, the servers for both The Lord of the Rings Online and Dungeons & Dragons Online were maintained and supported.

By December 2016, Turbine was no longer involved with the development of The Lord of the Rings Online or Dungeons & Dragons Online. Instead a spin-off studio under the name of Standing Stone Games was formed to take over further development of the game, with game staff moving from Turbine to the new studio. As part of this transition, Daybreak Game Company became the new publisher, taking over from Warner Bros. Interactive Entertainment. Asheron's Call IP remained as a property of Turbine, and the servers for both Asheron's Call and Asheron's Call 2: Fallen Kings were closed on January 31, 2017.

By November 2018, the studio was rebranded and became WB Games Boston.

== Games developed ==
Year	Title	Platform(s)	
Year	Title	PC	Mobile
1999	Asheron's Call	Microsoft Windows	—
2002	Asheron's Call 2: Fallen Kings	Microsoft Windows	—
2006	Dungeons & Dragons Online	Microsoft Windows, OS X	—
2007	The Lord of the Rings Online	Microsoft Windows, OS X	—
2015	Infinite Crisis	Microsoft Windows	—
2016	Batman: Arkham Underworld	—	Android, iOS
2017	Game of Thrones: Conquest	—	Android, iOS
2026	Game of Thrones: Dragonfire	—	Android, iOS
