= Battlestar Galactica Online =

2011 video game

- Developers: Bigpoint Games; Artplant
- Publisher: Bigpoint Games
- Engine: Unity 3D
- Platforms: Windows, Mac OS X
- Release: (Beta test: February 8, 2011)
- Genre: MMO

Battlestar Galactica Online was a browser-based massively multiplayer online game (MMO) loosely based on the 2004 television series Battlestar Galactica. Released in open beta on February 8, 2011, it was developed by Bigpoint Games and Artplant using the Unity game engine for the game client in the browser. The game server was written in Erlang. In less than three months of release, the game surpassed two million registered users.

Bigpoint announced in early January 2019 that the game servers would be closed at the end of the month, and the game permanently shut down in the early morning hours of February 1, 2019.

== Gameplay ==
Battlestar Galactica Online was a space-based flight-combat game set in the Battlestar Galactica universe, in which the player took the role of a pilot. A player could select to be either a Colonial (human) or Cylon (cyborg) pilot upon registration, after which the player was locked into that side. Multiple log-ins were possible, allowing players to create multiple pilots of both factions. The game was a browser-based MMO, though it had an upper limit on the number of players that could be in one sector at a time. Battles could take place between hundreds of pilots at once.

Once registered, the player completed an in-game tutorial, during which the plot of the game is shown. After completing the tutorial a player would enter the game at their home sector. The game comprised various sectors that could be jumped into, and both sides could win control of individual sectors. Players could also fight each other in "battlespace", a small area separate from the sectors designed for small scale pilot vs. pilot engagements.

Ships were arranged into four main types: Interceptor, Assault, Command, and Multi-role. These were then subdivided into three classes: Strikes, Escorts, and Lines. A fourth class, Capital Ships, also existed and consisted of Carriers, Battlestars and Basestars.

There were also stationary game features such as "outposts" and "platforms" which could be targeted, and mining ships could also be created that the other side could attack. Players achieving points could see their scores through the leaderboard and 'level up', with the game having no defined ending. Ships had to be bought, and were unlocked for purchase as the player levelled up.

Players could either purchase ships and weapons with virtual currency they bought from Bigpoint, or "grind" in-game to collect enough points and merits to buy and equip their ships.
