= DarkOrbit =

2006 massively multiplayer video game

- Developer: Bigpoint
- Publisher: Bigpoint
- Platforms: Web; Microsoft Windows; Mac; Linux
- Release: December 11, 2006
- Genres: MMO, Action role-playing
- Mode: Multiplayer

DarkOrbit, later renamed to DarkOrbit: Reloaded is a massively multiplayer online game developed by Bigpoint Games. The game is set in outer space, where players control a spaceship to battle against non-player characters and other players. It is a three-dimensional isometric Flash game with over 300 million registered accounts.

== Gameplay ==
Players must control a spaceship to battle against evil non-player characters and other players. If a player defeats an enemy, they will be given rewards, which they can use to upgrade their spaceship and its equipment. DarkOrbit is a free to play game with an optional monthly subscription called Premium that adds various benefits. An additional in-game currency called Uridium can also be purchased to buy Elite items. The game was originally playable within a web browser and did not require any download, while in the wake of the discontinuation of Adobe Flash Player, it was made available on Mac/Windows/Linux platforms with a standalone launcher. At the start of the game, the player chooses between three companies : Venus Resources Unlimited (VRU), Earth Industries Corporation (EIC) and Mars Mining Operations (MMO). In the story, one more company exists (Saturn Autonomous Technology) but not for the players. Players are teleported to the home map to begin quests from Mission Control. The objective of the game is to gain wealth and power both individually and for the company.

=== Top User Points ===
This is a formula that will divide the player's Experience by 100,000 and Honor by 100, which will result in the player's top user points. Top user points show up in the hall of fame.

=== Rank Points ===
Rank points are also based on a mathematical formula that is figured by a variety of factors, such as experience, level, honor, quests finished, Ships Points destroyed, Alien Points destroyed, and the player's ship type. There are also factors that will reduce the player's rank points such as times destroyed, own company kills, radiation zone destructions, and phoenix (starter) ships destroyed. Rank Points do not show up in the hall of fame.

=== Economy ===
DarkOrbit uses two types of currencies: Credits and Uridium. Uridium, common abbreviated "Uri", is more valuable and harder to obtain. Some types of equipment and ammunition can be purchased using credits, however the most valuable or "Elite" items can only be bought with uridium; the term "Full-Elite" refers to players who have fully equipped their ship with Elite items. For some of these Elite items, there is an option to bid using Credits in an auction system, which is used to control the inflation of Credits. Many new items are not offered in trade. The P.E.T. 10 is a highly priced drone that increases in costs as the player levels it up. Ship designs are also available in the auction. However, certain valuable equipment such as Drone designs or Elite laser ammo are only available in the regular Store. Uridium can be purchased in exchange for real money via PayPal, credit card, or another method of payment, and can't be traded.

=== Combat ===
DarkOrbit utilizes a real-time combat system. In combat, a variety of weapons can be used to destroy aliens and other players. These include laser cannons, laser ammunition, rockets, rocket launchers, and mines. Players need to click on their target to lock on before they can begin shooting. Successfully destroying an enemy will result in a "cargo box" containing ore being dropped that the player can take. If the destroyed ship is a player, it will cost 500 Uridium to repair the ship, although the ship started with in the game is free to repair. This was available only before Darkorbit Reloaded. At the moment, players can choose to repair their ship for free, spawning at their home base, paying 700 Uridium (or one repair credit + 200 Uridium) to spawn at the nearest portal on the map (note that on 4-x maps there are not demilitarized zones, so be careful), or 800 Uridium (or one repair credit + 300 Uridium) to spawn at the same spot their ship got destroyed. Players start of the game with a Phoenix, a free but easily destroyed ship. As the player advances in the game, they can buy better ships. There are a total of 53 different ships that can be bought, with the Goliath, the Aegis, the Citadel, and the Vengeance typically being regarded as the best ships. Some ships can only be purchased with real money during special events. Ships can be equipped with a variety of items, including shield generators, speed engines, laser cannons, rocket launchers, ammunition, and many other accessories.

=== Clans ===
Players can join a clan if they pay 1,500 credits. Benefits of joining a clan include help from clan mates and clan payouts in the form of credits. However, most clans have a clan tax (between 0% and 5%) that is collected into the clans treasury daily. Clans can help players level up, gain credits and compete against other rivals. In addition, a player can found a clan for 300,000 credits. There is also a page in the game that shows which clan players are online, if they are ready for action on the player's map or if they are offline. The menu also allows players to invite them into group without having to write their name. Clans can engage in wars with one another.

=== Skylab ===
The Skylab is a system used to produce and refine ores, such as Prometium, Endurium, and Terbium. These basic ores can be refined to Prometid and Duranium, which when combined with Xenomit can make Promerium. There is also a crystal named Seprom that can only be produced in the Skylab by further refining Promerium. Seprom cannot be sold however the ore can give weapons and shields a great power boost. These ores can then be sent to the player's ship and either sold for credits or equipped to enhance the ship. The highest level is 20 for upgrading the Skylab.

=== Pilot Sheet ===
The Pilot Bio is a very powerful skill tree designed to give players extra advantages in-game. Pilot points are needed to work the Pilot Bio. Pilot Points can be obtained by buying log disks from the shop, shooting down boss or uber NPCs for a small chance, or even by completing Galaxy Gates. Each pilot point can be used to acquire certain abilities that help the player in battle or other game functions. A player can have up to fifty pilot points in their bio. When certain skills are maxed out, they generate special effects, such as brighter lasers, rocket trails, etc. Most pilot points a player can spend is 50.

=== Galaxy Gates ===
For 100 Uridium or from Palladium, a resource which is converted into extra energy, players can "spin" a galaxy Gate Generator, which gives ammunition, free repairs, or parts for a "galaxy gate". Once enough parts to build one of the many galaxy gates are collected, players are sent through a portal into a map where enemies cannot reach the player, only NPCs. Once in, the only way out is to be shot down, or to destroy the entire "wave" of aliens. These waves get progressively harder throughout the duration of the gate; they also become more difficult depending on the active gate. The reward for completing a gate without being shot down more than twice is quite substantial.

=== LoW Gate ===
Also called the Outfit Gate, the Lord of War map is found on every x-3 map. To enter this gate, one must be in an outfit. Once in the gate, players find there is no way out - they must "finish" the gate. The goal is to energize four probes at the corners of the map; once this is accomplished, the station at the center of the map gains the ability to heal any player that goes within range. In addition, a considerable horde of aliens spawns, along with the Century Falcon. Killing this extremely tough NPC awards the player the achievement "Falconer" and ejects them from the map. All destructions inside the map result in free repairs.

== Special Events ==
DarkOrbit has special events from time to time that can give players special rewards.

=== Jackpot Arena ===
Jackpot Arena is a monthly event on the second Sunday of every month, in which all players who sign up fight each other in 1 vs 1 until only one ship is left surviving. The winning player will receive real cash up to €10,000. from DarkOrbit, based on how many "Jackpot euros" they had. Jackpot dollars can be found in bonus boxes that are scattered across space. The Jackpot Arena has been suspended Permanently.

=== Team Death Match ===
The Team Death Match is an event that in which five ships from one company work together to kill five ships from an enemy company. The winning team receives rewards at the end and is taken to the next level. This keeps on continuing until the player dies (or their team loses).

=== Spaceball ===
Spaceball is an event that takes place in the map 4-4, with the objective of scoring goals by shooting an NPC ball to the player's x-5 portal. After a goal has been scored cargo boxes are released around the portal containing assorted prizes such as uridium, ammunition, and jackpot dollars. The winning company wins prizes for 24 hours the next day such as x%EP, honor, bonus box rewards, and cargo selling price.

=== Invasion ===
An event that takes place in different maps, depending on the player's level. This event is made up of waves, each wave harder to pass than the one before. Should the player die on the invasion map, repairs are free.

For levels 5-9 an invasion gate appears in the middle of x-1, in x-3 a gate appears for all those between levels 10-14 and in x-5 all players at levels 15 and above have to enter invasion here. The gate in x-1 typically contains NPCs that are easier to kill with the higher gates having tougher enemies.

=== Capture The Beacon ===
Capture The Beacon, like the traditional game capture the flag, is an event where all 3 companies have beacons in their x-2 maps which must be protected by the defending company, and captured by the attacking company, and taken back to their own x-2 map. Games are 1 hour long, company with most points gets a 1-hour prize such as x% more experience, honor, bonus box rewards, etc.

=== Scoremageddon ===
Players fight in PvP battles to gain points. More points are awarded based on combos. The top 50 in points at the end will win various prizes such as UCB-100, PLD-8, Special Mines, and even Uridium. Players start with five lives.

=== Infiltration ===
NPCs will spawn every 10 minutes. The objective is to destroy all NPCs to earn a point for the player's company. The NPCs have camouflage and are marked as yellow on the minimap. Every map, except x-1, have varying amounts of NPCs, and once they are all destroyed there will be a message to all players on the map saying all the Infiltrators have been destroyed.

=== Birthday Gate ===
To commemorate the date that DarkOrbit went online, every year on December 11, a gate appears on the home map, given free to all players. Weakened aliens, usually at half-strength, are found in the gate. The rewards are not as large as other gates, since the enemies are weaker. They also give players 35.000 uridium.

== Community ==
The official DarkOrbit forums are powered by vBulletin. The forums provide a place for DarkOrbit to announce updates and events as well as a place for players to ask questions, discuss the game, and give suggestions. In addition, DarkOrbit's support can be contacted via email by players wishing to report a bug or make a complaint. There is a third-party private server of the game called Andromeda.

== Development ==
DarkOrbit started as a closed beta test, in which over 80,000 players participated. They later on passed into an open beta phase. Finally, on September 1, 2005, the game passed into the subscription phase, which is expected to continue for the entire lifespan of the game. Currently, there are 300 million registered accounts.

== Reception ==
Joystiq called it an "insane shooter" with a mix of Asteroids and EVE Online.
