= Bigpoint =

German video game developer

Bigpoint GmbH
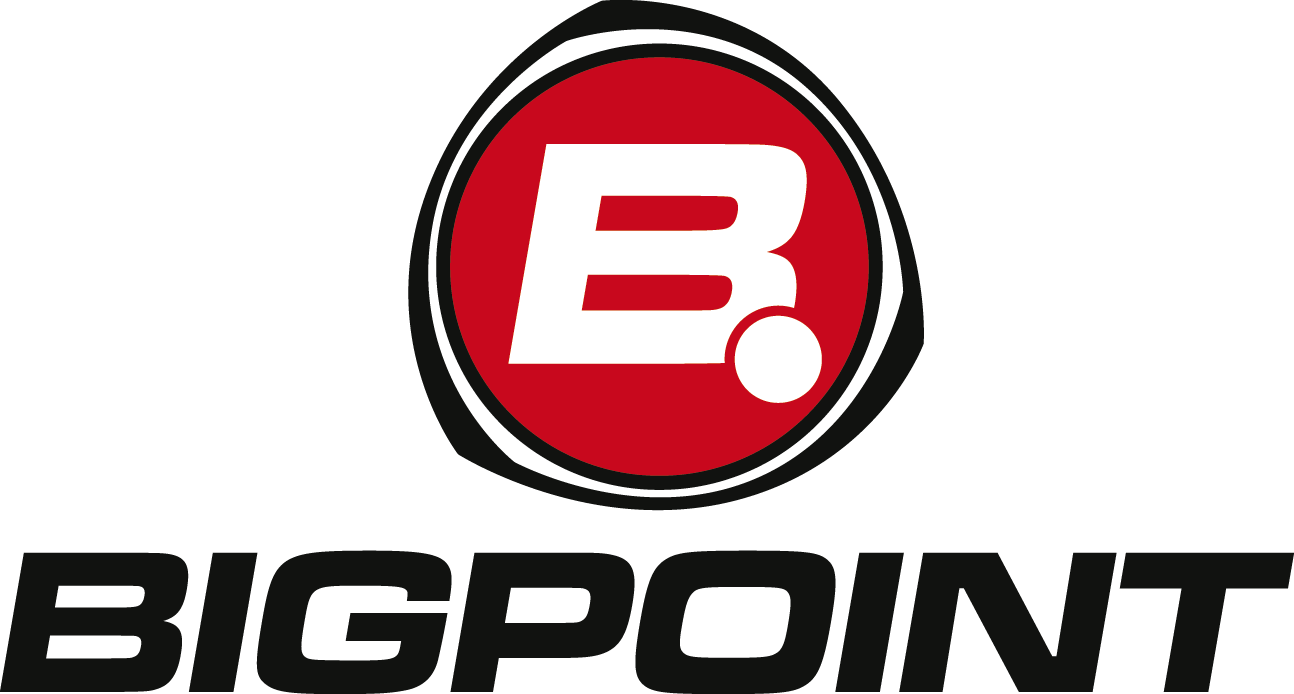
- Type: GmbH
- Industry: Browser games
- Founded: 2002
- Founder: Heiko Hubertz
- Headquarters: Hamburg, Germany
- Key people: Wanqin Liu, Michelle Zou (Managing Director)
- Number of employees: 100 (2024)
- Parent: Youzu Interactive
- Website: Official page

Bigpoint GmbH is a German video game developer. The company develops stand-alone browser-based games as well as social network games. Bigpoint has over 200 million registered users (announced in June 2011).

In addition to its headquarters in Hamburg, Germany, Bigpoint maintains offices in Berlin, San Francisco, Malta and São Paulo. Some of the company's games include Battlestar Galactica Online, Farmerama, Drakensang Online, DarkOrbit and Seafight. The studio was acquired by Youzu Interactive in 2016 and continues to operate as an independent subsidiary.

== History ==
In 2002, the company was founded by Heiko Hubertz as m.wire GmbH in Hamburg, Germany's second largest city. Heiko Hubertz started this company with a football management game in which every player transfer would cost a small amount for famous football players. Bigpoint's first game was Icefighter, an ice hockey management simulation. Till the end of 2004 there were further games launched, "F1Manager" and "Fussballmanager" (Football Manager in German). In 2005 the company was renamed to e-sport GmbH. In 2006 Samwer brothers with European Founders Fund and beginning of 2007 United Internet invested in the company. The company quickly expanded, having one million registered users in 2006. By 2007, Bigpoint was running 22 browser games.

In June 2008, General Electric and NBC Universal, along with European private-equity group GMT Communications Partners, bought out a 70 percent share of Bigpoint, leaving the remaining 30 percent share under Heiko Hubertz's control.

By 2009, Bigpoint reached more than 100 million users and had a revenue of more than 50 million Euros.

On April 26, 2011, TA Associates and Summit Partners invested $350 million into Bigpoint to become the majority shareholders. On May 16, 2011, Bigpointdotcom posted a video on YouTube.com announcing its new office building. Previous shareholders Comcast Interactive Capital's Peacock Equity Fund sold its holdings in this transaction. GMT Communications Partners and GE sold a majority of their stakes. Hubertz retained his existing ownership stake in the company.

In May 2011, Bigpoint had more than 800 employees worldwide.

On October 23, 2012, Bigpoint laid off 120 staff members. At the same time Heiko Hubertz stepped down as CEO.

In March 2016, the developer was acquired by Youzu Interactive (GTArcade) in an €80 million ($89.68 million) stock buyout.

== Used technology ==
Games are developed using PHP, Adobe Flash, Java and the Unity engine.

== List of games developed by Bigpoint ==
- Pirate Storm
- Icefighter
- Fussballmanager
- Gangs of Crime (formerly known as Mafia 1930)
- Gladiatoren
- Managergames Hockey
- Managergames Soccer
- Seafight
- Land of Destruction
- DarkOrbit
- Chaoscars
- SpeedCars
- SpeedSpace
- The Pimps
- ActionLeague
- Damoria
- K.O. Champs
- Gladius II
- SpaceInvasion
- War of Titans
- BeBees
- Parsec
- Deepolis
- XBlaster
- Hellblades
- ZooMumba
- Battlestar Galactica Online
- Skyrama
- PonyRama
- RamaCity
- AquaRama
- FantasyRama
- Drakensang Online
- Kultan - The World Beyond
- The Mummy Online
- Universal Monsters Online
- Rising Cities
- PirateStorm

== List of games published by Bigpoint ==
- WonderKing Online
- Drift City
- War Machines
- Terminator Salvation
- Rise of Gods
- Case White
- SpaceConquer
- Skaph (by Wadim Kapinos, a promotion from 2009 August)
- Rangersland International
- Pirates 1709 International
- Wanted
- 11 Manager
- Arenas of Glory
- Castle Fight International
- Puzzle Pirates
- Xhodon
- Anophis
- Dolumar
- Generated Affixation: the Nexus Lancinate
- Gameglobe
