= Warner Bros. Games =

American video game publisher

- Logo used since 2023
- Formerly: Warner Bros. Interactive Entertainment (2004–2021)
- Type: Division
- Industry: Video games
- Founded: January 14, 2004; 22 years ago
- Headquarters: Burbank, California, US
- Products: Batman: Arkham series; F.E.A.R. series; Injustice series; Lego series; Middle-earth series; Mortal Kombat series; Scribblenauts series
- Parent: Warner Bros. (2004–2005); Warner Bros. Home Entertainment (2005–2022); Warner Bros. Discovery Global Consumer Products (2022–present)
- Subsidiaries: Avalanche Software; NetherRealm Studios; Portkey Games; Rocksteady Studios; TT Games; WB Games Boston; WB Games Montréal; WB Games New York; WB Games San Francisco
- Website: warnerbrosgames.com

Warner Bros. Games (formerly Warner Bros. Interactive Entertainment) is an American video game publisher based in Burbank, California. The publisher was founded as a division of Warner Bros. on January 14, 2004, as well as the WB Games brand. Warner Bros. Games manages the wholly owned game development studios TT Games, Rocksteady Studios, NetherRealm Studios, WB Games Boston, Avalanche Software and WB Games Montréal among others.

== History ==
=== Warner Bros. Interactive Entertainment ===
The foundation of Warner Bros. Interactive Entertainment (WBIE) under Warner Bros. was announced on January 14, 2004, along with the WB Games (Warner Bros. Games) brand, under which WBIE would publish games. Jason Hall, previously of Monolith Productions, was named as its senior vice president. Before this, the Warner Bros. Interactive Entertainment brand was used by Warner Bros. Consumer Products for licensing purposes since 1995 with the video game tie-in of Batman Forever. The name was initially used as a brand name of WBCP. In 2003, Warner Bros. co-published its first title Looney Tunes: Back in Action as part of a partnership with the Electronic Arts subsidiary EA Distribution, becoming the first title published by Warner Bros. Interactive Entertainment. In August, Warner Bros. purchased Monolith Productions, becoming its first self-owned game developer.

In 2005, the first game that Monolith developed in conjunction with Warner Bros. was The Matrix Online, which Sega helped co-publish. In July, Warner Bros. Interactive Entertainment announced the release of its first self-published title, Friends: The One with All the Trivia, for Microsoft Windows and the PlayStation 2, on November 15, 2005. The game would be distributed through Warner Home Video, and would tie-in with the release of the Friends complete series DVD boxset. In October, Warner Bros. created Warner Bros. Home Entertainment and WBIE was transferred as part of it.

In December 2006, WBIE entered in a North American distribution deal with British game publisher Codemasters. Also within that month, Warner Bros. Games invested a 10.3% stake in SCi Entertainment, the owner of Eidos Interactive. The deal also included a licensing deal for Eidos to develop and publish titles based on select DC Comics properties (Comic book Batman and Legion of Super Heroes), Looney Tunes (including Loonatics Unleashed), Hanna-Barbera and The O.C..

In 2007, it implemented a five-year plan, the goal of which was to expand in the video game industry and included the acquisition of studios for internal development and the creation of a studio (WB Games) in the Seattle area that will run all the games published and developed by the company; the first acquisition under this plan was Britain's TT Games that same year, for £100 million. The deal included the publishing division of the company, developers Traveller's Tales and TT Fusion, motion capture studio TT Centroid, and animation studio TT Animation.

In April 2008, Warner Bros. announced that it had increased its stake in SCi Entertainment to 35%, allowing WBIE to distribute Eidos Interactive titles in North America. On December 15, 2008, shortly after SCi changed its name to Eidos plc, Warner acquired a total of 10 million shares of the company, raising its owned amount to 19.92%, after an agreement which prevented Time Warner from acquiring more shares was scrapped one month earlier. On January 28, 2009, The Hollywood Reporter reported the deal also gave Warner the rights of the Tomb Raider film series, previously owned by Paramount Pictures. On February 12, 2009, Warner Bros. backed Square Enix's acquisition offer worth £84.3 million for Eidos plc as majority stakeholder.

On February 4, 2009, WBIT purchased Snowblind Studios. The terms of the deal were not disclosed, but the acquisition serves to strengthen the publisher's internal development effort. In August 2009, Warner announced that it would purchase a majority of the assets of American publisher Midway Games, operating under Chapter 11 bankruptcy protection, for $49 million. The assets purchased include Midway's studio in Chicago and Surreal Software, resulting in the ownership to the rights to the Joust, Mortal Kombat, The Suffering, Spy Hunter and Wheelman series, as well as the library of the former Atari Games, which had previously been owned by Time Warner. Midway had previously worked with Warner Bros. on several games, including Mortal Kombat vs. DC Universe. Midway intended to hold an auction of its assets on June 29, 2009, but no other bids were placed. On July 10, the sale to Warner was completed for approximately US$49 million. In the process, Warner became the owner of the Blitz: The League series. On July 28, 2009, Midway's Mortal Kombat team was rebranded WB Games Chicago.

On January 13, 2010, WBIT secured a worldwide licensing agreement with Sesame Workshop to secure video game rights to Sesame Street, starting in fall 2010 with Elmo's A-to-Zoo Adventure and Cookie's Counting Carnival. On February 23, 2010, Warner Bros. Games purchased a majority stake in independent London-based developer Rocksteady Studios, an independent development studio based in London. Rocksteady and Warner had previously worked together in Batman: Arkham Asylum and Batman: Arkham City, and have announced they will work in the future with more Warner Bros. licenses. On March 22, 2010, WBIE became the latest videogame company to open a studio in Quebec. Martin Tremblay was chosen to lead the new Montreal studio, WB Games Montréal. The studio gradually grow to include more than 300 people by the end of 2015. Tremblay also said that Warner would open another studio in another city soon. He also said that WB Games Montréal will focus on creating games based on the DC Comics license. On April 9, WBIE announced it would publish a third installment to the F.E.A.R. series in the fall of 2010. On April 20, Warner Bros. Home Entertainment Group acquired Turbine, Inc. the developer of the famous MMOs Asheron's Call, Dungeons & Dragons Online and The Lord of the Rings Online. On the same day, WBIT announced that the WB Games Chicago studio would be reincorporated as NetherRealm Studios and shortly afterward announced a reboot of Mortal Kombat. On June 4, WBHEG and Turbine announced that the massively multiplayer online title The Lord of the Rings Online would go free-to-play that autumn. WBIE announced 6 days later that Mortal Kombat, a reboot of the series (and considered the series' most brutal installment to date), was due for release on the PlayStation 3 and Xbox 360 in 2011. Mortal Kombat was developed by the newly renamed NetherRealm Studios, led by series creator and creative director Ed Boon. Branching out from Game Party for the Wii, WBIE attempted to leverage the Xbox 360's new full-body motion-sensing device Kinect on June 14 and revealed Game Party: In Motion for the new device, set for a November 4 release as a launch title.

In May 2011, Codemasters changed its North American distributor to THQ. However, the company would reinstate its distribution deal with Warner in March 2012 following THQ's financial difficulties.

In 2013, after Kevin Tsujihara became chairman and CEO of Warner Bros., he promoted Diane Nelson to the post of President and Chief Content Officer of Warner Bros. Interactive Entertainment.

In January 2015, David Haddad was named Executive Vice President and General Manager of the company and was promoted to President in October.

In October 2016, AT&T announced its intentions to acquire Time Warner, making Warner Bros. Interactive Entertainment a subsidiary of AT&T. On December 19, 2016, it was announced that Warner Bros. would no longer develop or publish The Lord of the Rings Online or Dungeons & Dragons Online; further development of the game would be handled by a newly formed studio, Standing Stone Games, with publishing to be transitioned over to Daybreak Game Company. The new studio would take the old development team from Turbine, leaving Turbine as a mobile-only developer. As part of the deal, Daybreak did not pick up the rights to Asheron's Call, an original IP created by Turbine and thus owned by Warner Bros. as part of the 2010 acquisition. This resulted in the closure of Asheron's Call and Asheron's Call 2: Fallen Kings on January 31, 2017.

On January 24, 2017, it was announced that recently-closed studio Avalanche Software and its Octane engine software were acquired by Warner Bros. from Disney Interactive Studios and the studio was reopened, with John Blackburn returning as its CEO. The studio's first title under Warner was a companion video game to the Disney-Pixar film Cars 3, titled Cars 3: Driven to Win, in partnership with Warner Bros., Disney, and Pixar. On February 8, Playdemic was acquired through TT Games to make Lego games for mobile devices. On July 11, 2018, it acquired Plexchat, a communications platform for mobile games, with its founder and staff joining WB Games San Francisco.

In mid-2020, there had been industry rumors that AT&T, in order to raise funds, was looking to sell off parts of its divisions, with WBIE as one that had been rumored to be up for sale that would have raised $4 billion, according to CNBC and The Information. However, in an August 2020 press release regarding an organizational restructuring, WarnerMedia stated that WBIE "remains part of the Studios and Networks group". Bloomberg News reported AT&T has confirmed to no longer be selling the game division, the decision to keep the division amid a change in leadership at AT&T in July of that year.

=== Rebrand to Warner Bros. Games ===
In May 2021, AT&T announced that it was splitting off WarnerMedia for about $43 billion, where it would be merged with Discovery, Inc. As part of this sale, there were rumors that only portions of WBIE would be moved with the bulk of the other WarnerMedia properties, but WBIE would be retained as its previous additional brand, Warner Bros. Games, under the newly merged company named Warner Bros. Discovery. Playdemic was one of the few properties divested from the merger, with it being sold to Electronic Arts for $1.4 billion on September 20, 2021. It was announced on April 7, 2022, that Warner Bros. Games was reorganized with streaming services HBO Max and Discovery+ to form Warner Bros. Discovery Global Streaming & Interactive Entertainment, to be overseen by JB Perrette; WB Games president David Haddad would report directly to Perrette. The merger was completed on April 8.

In July 2024, Warner Bros. Games acquired MultiVersus developer Player First Games.

In July 2024, the Screen Actors Guild-American Federation of Television and Radio Artists (SAG-AFTRA), a labor union of which numerous video game voice actors are members, would initiate a labor strike against a number of video publishers, including WB Games, over concerns about lack of A.I. protections for not only video game voice actors, but also the use of A.I to replicate an actor’s voice, or create a digital replica of their likeness.

During the third quarter of 2024, in a financial call, Warner Bros. Discovery President and CEO David Zaslav and CFO Gunnar Wiedenfels state that the underperformances of MultiVersus and Harry Potter: Quidditch Champions had added another $100 million to the $200 million writedown to the company's games business in 2024. Warner Bros. Games will now focus more on its four other successful franchises going forward, Zaslav added during the call.

In January 2025, David Haddad announced that in the coming months he would be exiting his role as President after 12 years leading the games division. In February 2025, Warner Bros. Games confirmed the closure of Monolith Productions, Player First Games and WB Games San Diego. By June 2025, Warner Bros. Discovery announced that Warner Bros. Games would be restructured with a focus on the DC Universe, Harry Potter, Mortal Kombat, and Game of Thrones, and that the division would be part of the Streaming & Studios company when Warner Bros. Discovery would split in mid-2026. Yves Lachance, of WB Games Montreal, was promoted to oversee the Harry Potter and Game of Thrones titles, while NetherRealm's studio head Shaun Himmerick was promoted to oversee the DC Universe and Mortal Kombat titles.

=== Merger with Paramount ===
In October 2026, it was announced that Warner Bros. Games would be merged with Paramount Games Studio into one combined gaming division, supervised by Tony Driscoll, following Paramount's acquisition of Warner Bros. Discovery.

== Subsidiaries and divisions ==
=== Publishing labels ===
- Portkey Games, which was founded in 2017 as the publishing label for games set within the Wizarding World franchise.

=== Studios ===
- Avalanche Software in Salt Lake City, Utah, founded in 1995, acquired by The Walt Disney Company in 2005, closed along with the former parent company of the studio, Disney Interactive Studios, in May 2016. Acquired by WBIE in January 2017, which reopened the studio.
- NetherRealm Studios in Chicago, founded as Midway Studios Chicago in 1988, acquired in 2009, and renamed in 2010.
- Rocksteady Studios in London, founded in 2004 and majority stake acquired in February 2010.
- TT Games in Knutsford, England, founded in 2005, acquired November 8, 2007.
  - Traveller's Tales in Knutsford, England, founded in 1989, reorganized as the main development division of TT Games in 2005.
  - TT Fusion in Wilmslow, England, founded in 2005 as Embryonic Studios, reorganized as a division of TT Games in 2007.
  - TT Games Publishing in Bristol, England, founded in 2003 as Giant Interactive Entertainment, reorganized as a division of TT Games in 2005.
  - TT Odyssey in Brighton, founded in January 2018 as TT Games Brighton, renamed in March 2018.
- WB Games Montréal in Montreal, founded in 2010.
- WB Games Boston in Needham, Massachusetts, founded in 1994, acquired in 2010.
- WB Games New York in Troy, New York, founded as Agora Games in 2005, acquired and renamed in 2017.
- WB Games San Francisco in San Francisco, founded in 2013.

=== Former studios ===
- Snowblind Studios in Kirkland, Washington, founded in 1997, acquired in 2009. Merged into Monolith Productions in 2012.
- Surreal Software in Kirkland, Washington, founded in 1995, acquired from Midway Games on July 27, 2009. Merged into Monolith Productions in 2010.
- Playdemic in Manchester, England, founded in 2010, acquired on February 8, 2017, sold to Electronic Arts in June 2021.
- Monolith Productions in Kirkland, Washington, founded in 1994, acquired in 2004, shut down in February 2025.
- Player First Games in Los Angeles, founded in 2019, acquired in July 2024, shut down in February 2025.
- WB Games San Diego in San Diego, founded in 2019, shut down in February 2025.

=== Other assets ===
Warner Bros. Games owns the assets and IPs of Midway Games, Bally Manufacturing, Williams Electronics and Atari Games.

== See also ==
- List of video games based on DC Comics
  - List of Superman video games
  - List of Batman video games
- Harry Potter video games
- Middle-earth in video games
- List of Looney Tunes video games
  - List of Tiny Toon Adventures video games
- List of Tom and Jerry video games
