= Game of Thrones: Winter is Coming =

2019 video game

- Cover art
- Developer: Yoozoo Games
- Publisher: Yoozoo Games
- Platforms: Browser, Microsoft Windows, iOS, Android
- Release: WW: March 15, 2019
- Genre: Massively multiplayer online real-time strategy

Game of Thrones: Winter is Coming is a 2019 massively multiplayer online real-time strategy game developed and published Yoozoo Games. It is based on the television series Game of Thrones. The game was announced in August 2018, during Gamescom, and was released on March 15, 2019, originally as a browser game. A Microsoft Windows version was released on November 14, 2019, and a mobile port was released on July 21, 2020.

== Gameplay ==
The player takes the role of a lord or lady of one of the seven kingdoms of Westeros and progresses by training soldiers, recruiting characters and forming an alliance with other players. In the story's timeline, the game starts after Eddard Stark dies, but as if all seven kingdoms had thereupon seceded, not only the North. In the game, a dragon can be obtained as an egg that can be hatched, and the hatchling can be raised through its juvenile stage to being big enough to be useful in battle and air-search.
