= List of awards and nominations received by House of the Dragon =

House of the Dragon awards and nominations
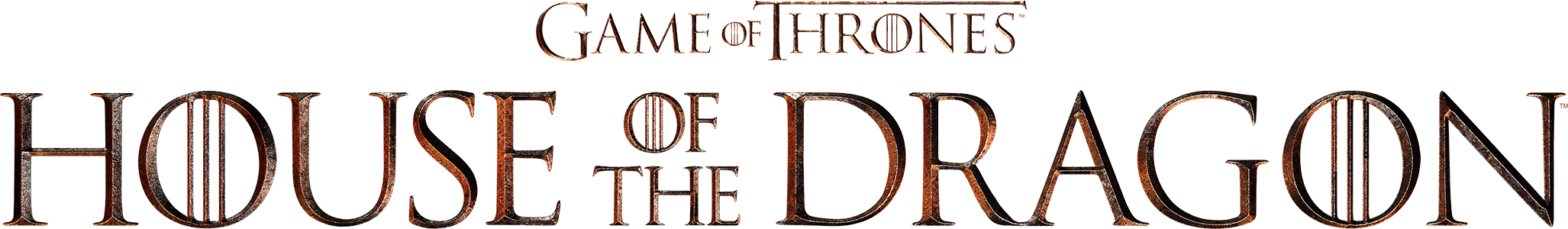
Awards and nominations
Award	Wins	Nominations
American Society of Cinematographers Awards	0	2
Art Directors Guild Awards	0	1
Annie Awards	0	1
BAFTA Cymru Awards	0	1
British Academy Television Craft Awards	3	3
British Society of Cinematographers Awards	0	1
Costume Designers Guild Awards	1	1
Critics' Choice Movie Awards	0	3
Critics' Choice Super Awards	0	4
Golden Globe Awards	1	2
Golden Reel Awards	0	1
Golden Trailer Awards	2	3
Hollywood Critics Association TV Awards	0	2
Make-Up Artists and Hair Stylists Guild Awards	0	1
MTV Movie & TV Awards	0	1
People's Choice Awards	0	2
Primetime Emmy Awards	0	1
Creative Arts Emmy Awards	1	8
Queerties Awards	0	1
Satellite Awards	0	1
Saturn Awards	1	4
Screen Actors Guild Awards	0	1
Visual Effects Society Awards	0	4

Totals (Note: Certain award groups do not simply award one winner. They acknowledge several different recipients, have runners-up, and have third place. Since this is a specific recognition and is different from losing an award, runner-up mentions are considered wins in this award tally. For simplification and to avoid errors, each award in this list has been presumed to have had a prior nomination.)
- Wins: 9
- Nominations: 47

House of the Dragon is an American fantasy drama television series created for HBO by George R. R. Martin and Ryan Condal. The series is a prequel to Game of Thrones which also ran on HBO from 2011 to 2019 and is the second television series in the Game of Thrones franchise. The show is based on Martin's Fire & Blood fantasy book and chronicles a war of succession, titled the "Dance of the Dragons", between House Targaryen family members and claimants to the Iron Throne.

The first season premiered on August 21, 2022 and received positive critical reviews. It was nominated for multiple awards in both the creative and technical categories. The first season received eight Primetime and Creative Arts Emmy award nominations, including Primetime Emmy Award for Outstanding Drama Series. In addition, the show won the Golden Globe Award for Best Television Series – Drama in 2022. Other nominations include People's Choice Awards, Critics' Choice Movie Awards, and Screen Actors Guild Awards. The ensemble cast also received multiple nominations and awards for their work. Matt Smith, Emma D'Arcy, and Milly Alcock received Saturn Awards nominations for their performances. The cinematography, costume design, and makeup for the series has been nominated for multiple critical and guild awards.

== Awards and nominations ==
Award	Year	Category	Nominee	Result	Ref.
American Society of Cinematographers Awards	2023	Outstanding Achievement in Cinematography in Episode of a Series for Non-Commercial Television	Catherine Goldschmidt (for "The Lord of the Tides")	Nominated	
American Society of Cinematographers Awards	2023	Outstanding Achievement in Cinematography in Episode of a Series for Non-Commercial Television	Alejandro Martinez (for "The Green Council")	Nominated	
Art Directors Guild Awards	2023	Excellence in Production Design for a One-Hour Fantasy Single-Camera Series	Jim Clay (for "The Heirs of the Dragon")	Nominated	
Annie Awards	2025	Outstanding Achievement for Character Animation in a Live Action Production	Jason Snyman, Manjoe Chan, Chloe McLean, Cedric Enriquez Canlas, Vincent Lee	Nominated	
BAFTA Cymru Awards	2023	Best Actor	Rhys Ifans	Nominated	
BAFTA Television Craft Awards	2023	Best Make Up and Hair Design	Amanda Knight, Barbie Gower, Rosalia Culora	Won	
BAFTA Television Craft Awards	2023	Best Sound: Fiction	Alastair Sirkett, Doug Cooper, Martin Seeley, Paula Fairfield, Tim Hands, Adele Fletcher	Won	
BAFTA Television Craft Awards	2023	Best Special, Visual & Graphic Effects	Angus Bickerton, Nikeah Forde, Asa Shoul, Mike Dawson, MPC, Pixomondo	Won	
British Society of Cinematographers Awards	2023	Best Cinematography in a Television Drama	Fabian Wagner (for "The Heirs of the Dragon")	Nominated	
Costume Designers Guild Awards	2023	Excellence in Sci-Fi/Fantasy Television	Jany Temime (for "The Heirs of the Dragon")	Won	
Costume Designers Guild Awards	2025	Excellence in Sci-Fi/Fantasy Television	Caroline McCall (for "The Red Dragon and the Gold")	Nominated	
Critics' Choice Awards	2023	Best Drama Series	House of the Dragon	Nominated	
Critics' Choice Awards	2023	Best Supporting Actor in a Drama Series	Matt Smith	Nominated	
Critics' Choice Awards	2023	Best Supporting Actress in a Drama Series	Milly Alcock	Nominated	
Critics' Choice Super Awards	2023	Best Science Fiction/Fantasy Series	House of the Dragon	Nominated	
Critics' Choice Super Awards	2023	Best Actor in a Science Fiction/Fantasy Series	Matt Smith	Nominated	
Critics' Choice Super Awards	2023	Best Actress in a Science Fiction/Fantasy Series	Milly Alcock	Nominated	
Critics' Choice Super Awards	2023	Best Villain in a Series	Matt Smith	Nominated	
Critics' Choice Super Awards	2026	Best Science Fiction/Fantasy Series	House of the Dragon	Nominated	
Critics' Choice Super Awards	2026	Best Actor in a Science Fiction/Fantasy Series	Matt Smith	Nominated	
Critics' Choice Super Awards	2026	Best Actress in a Science Fiction/Fantasy Series	Emma D'Arcy	Nominated	
Critics' Choice Super Awards	2026	Best Villain in a Series	Ewan Mitchell	Nominated	
Golden Globe Awards	2023	Best Television Series – Drama	House of the Dragon	Won	
Golden Globe Awards	2023	Best Actress in a Television Series – Drama	Emma D'Arcy	Nominated	
Golden Globe Awards	2025	Best Actress in a Television Series – Drama	Emma D'Arcy	Nominated	
Golden Reel Awards	2025	Outstanding Achievement in Sound Editing – Broadcast Long Form Effects and Foley	Alastair Sirkett, Paula Fairfield, Martin Cantwell, Ruth Knight, Mathias Schuster, Rebecca Glover, Barnaby Smyth (for "The Red Dragon and the Gold")	Nominated	
Golden Trailer Awards	2022	Best Drama for a TV/Streaming Series (Trailer/Teaser/TV Spot)	House of the Dragon	Won	
Golden Trailer Awards	2023	Best Fantasy Adventure for a TV/Streaming Series (Trailer/Teaser/TV Spot)	"Heir" (GrandSon)	Nominated	
Golden Trailer Awards	2023	Best Sound Editing for a TV/Streaming Series (Trailer/Teaser/TV Spot)	"Heir" (GrandSon)	Nominated	
Golden Trailer Awards	2025	Best Fantasy Adventure (Trailer/Teaser) for a TV/Streaming Series	"Season 2: Official Trailer" (HBO MAX / Intermission Film)	Won	
Hollywood Critics Association TV Awards	2023	Best Actress in a Broadcast Network or Cable Series, Drama	Emma D'Arcy	Nominated	
Hollywood Critics Association TV Awards	2023	Best Supporting Actor in a Broadcast Network or Cable Series, Drama	Matt Smith	Nominated	
Make-Up Artists and Hair Stylists Guild Awards	2023	Best Period and/or Character Make-Up in a Television Series, Limited or Miniseries or Television New Media Series	Amanda Knight, Sara Kramer, Heather McMullen	Nominated	
Make-Up Artists and Hair Stylists Guild Awards	2025	Best Special Make-Up Effects in a Television Series, Limited or Miniseries or Television New Media Series	Waldo Mason, Emma Faulkes, Hannah Ecclestone, Heather McMullen	Nominated	
MTV Movie & TV Awards	2023	Best Breakthrough Performance	Emma D'Arcy	Nominated	
People's Choice Awards	2022	Favorite TV Show of 2022	House of the Dragon	Nominated	
People's Choice Awards	2022	Favorite Sci-Fi/Fantasy Show of 2022	House of the Dragon	Nominated	
Primetime Emmy Awards	2024	Outstanding Drama Series	House of the Dragon	Nominated	
Primetime Creative Arts Emmy Awards	2024	Outstanding Short Form Nonfiction or Reality Series	House of the Dragon: Inside the Episode	Nominated	
Primetime Creative Arts Emmy Awards	2024	Outstanding Production Design for a Narrative Period or Fantasy Program (One Hour or More)	Jim Clay, Dominic Masters, and Claire Nia Richards (for "The Heirs of the Dragon")	Nominated	
Primetime Creative Arts Emmy Awards	2024	Outstanding Cinematography for a Series (One Hour)	Catherine Goldschmidt (for "The Lord of the Tides")	Nominated	
Primetime Creative Arts Emmy Awards	2024	Outstanding Fantasy/Sci-Fi Costumes	Jany Temime, Katherine Burchill, Paul Yeowell, Designer Rachel George, Joanna Lynch (for "The Heirs of the Dragon")	Won	
Primetime Creative Arts Emmy Awards	2024	Outstanding Period and/or Character Makeup (Non-Prosthetic)	Amanda Knight, Hannah Eccleston, Heather McMullen, Kashiya Hinds, Harriet Thompson, Natalie Wickens, Bonny Monger (for "We Light the Way")	Nominated	
Primetime Creative Arts Emmy Awards	2024	Outstanding Prosthetic Makeup	Barrie Gower, Sarah Gower, Emma Faulkes, Duncan Jarman, Paula Eden (for "The Lord of the Tides")	Nominated	
Primetime Creative Arts Emmy Awards	2024	Outstanding Sound Editing for a Comedy or Drama Series (One Hour)	Al Sirkett, Tim Hands, Adele Fletcher, Paula Fairfield, David Klotz, Timeri Duplat, Mathias Schuster, Barnaby Smyth, Paula Boram (for "The Black Queen")	Nominated	
Primetime Creative Arts Emmy Awards	2024	Outstanding Special Visual Effects in a Season or a Movie	Angus Bickerton, Nikeah Forde, Thomas Horton, Sven Martin, Mark Spindler, Mark Dauth, Sebastian Meszmann, Mike Bell and Tobias Graa Winblad	Nominated	
Primetime Creative Arts Emmy Awards	2025	Outstanding Fantasy/Sci-Fi Costumes	Caroline McCall, Joanna Lynch, Polixeni Kyriacou, Aaron Timperley, Isabelle Conaghan (for "The Burning Mill")	Nominated	
Primetime Creative Arts Emmy Awards	2025	Outstanding Fantasy/Sci-Fi Hairstyling	Rosalia Culora, Stacey Johnson, Kashiya Hinds, Tania Couper, Sarah Spears, Ella Burton (for "Smallfolk")	Nominated	
Primetime Creative Arts Emmy Awards	2025	Outstanding Title Design	Garson Yu, Mulan Leong-Suzuki, James Robertson, Damian Stricker, Dan Tegnelia, Gregory Jones	Nominated	
Primetime Creative Arts Emmy Awards	2025	Outstanding Period and/or Character Makeup (Non-Prosthetic)	Amanda Knight, Sara Kramer, Harriet Thompson, Bonny Monger, Helen Currie, Natalie Wickens, Vickie Ellis (for "The Red Dragon and the Gold")	Won	
Primetime Creative Arts Emmy Awards	2025	Outstanding Prosthetic Makeup	Waldo Mason, Claire Cameron, Heather McMullen, Emma Faulkes, Hannah Eccleston (for "The Red Sowing")	Nominated	
Primetime Creative Arts Emmy Awards	2025	Outstanding Special Visual Effects in a Season or a Movie	Daði Einarsson, Lev Kolobov, Thomas Horton, Mike Dawson, Sven Martin, Fausto Tejeda, Wayne Taz Stables, Marcus Goodwin, and Martin Pelletier	Nominated	
Queerties Awards	2023	Best TV Performance	Emma D'Arcy	Runner-up	
Saturn Awards	2024	Best Fantasy Television Series	House of the Dragon	Nominated	
Saturn Awards	2024	Best Actress in a Television Series	Emma D'Arcy	Nominated	
Saturn Awards	2024	Best Supporting Actor in a Television Series	Matt Smith	Nominated	
Saturn Awards	2024	Best Performance by a Younger Actor on Television	Milly Alcock	Nominated	
Saturn Awards	2025	Best Fantasy Television Series	House of the Dragon	Won	
Saturn Awards	2025	Best Actress in a Television Series	Emma D'Arcy	Nominated	
Saturn Awards	2025	Best Supporting Actor in a Television Series	Matt Smith	Nominated	
Satellite Awards	2024	Best Genre Series	House of the Dragon	Nominated	
Screen Actors Guild Awards	2023	Outstanding Performance by a Stunt Ensemble in a Television Series	House of the Dragon	Nominated	
Screen Actors Guild Awards	2025	Outstanding Performance by a Stunt Ensemble in a Television Series	House of the Dragon	Nominated	
Set Decorators Society of America Awards	2024	Best Achievement in Décor/Design of a One Hour Fantasy or Science Fiction Series	Claire Nia Richards, Jim Clay	Nominated	
Visual Effects Society Awards	2023	Outstanding Visual Effects in a Photoreal Episode	Angus Bickerton, Nikeah Forde, Sven Martin, Michael Bell, Michael Dawson (for "The Black Queen")	Nominated	
Visual Effects Society Awards	2023	Outstanding Compositing & Lighting in an Episode	Kevin Friederichs, Sean Raffel, Florian Franke, Andreas Steinlein (for "The Black Queen")	Nominated	
Visual Effects Society Awards	2025	Outstanding Virtual Cinematography in a CG Project	Matt Perrin, James Thompson, Jacob Doehner, P.J. Dillon (for "The Red Dragon and the Gold" ("Battle at Rook's Rest")	Nominated	
Visual Effects Society Awards	2025	Outstanding Visual Effects in a Photoreal Episode	Daði Einarsson, Tom Horton, Sven Martin, Wayne Stables, Mike Dawson (for "The Red Dragon and the Gold" )	Nominated	

== See also ==
- List of awards and nominations received by Game of Thrones
