= Anna Francolini =

English actress (born 1973)

- Born: 30 October 1973 (age 52); Chertsey, England
- Education: University of Warwick (BA)
- Occupation: Actress
- Years active: 1994–present

Anna Francolini (born 30 October 1973) is an English actress.

== Early life ==
Francolini was born in Chertsey, Surrey, attended Bristol Grammar School and studied theatre at the University of Warwick. She also trained as a member of the National Youth Theatre.

== Career ==
After appearances in Godspell and Oliver during the early part of her career, Francolini appeared in two acclaimed musical productions at the Donmar Warehouse – Company (1995) and Merrily We Roll Along (2000), both by Stephen Sondheim. She also played the Baker's Wife in the Royal Opera House production of Sondheim's Into the Woods in 2007. She won the 2009 TMA Award for Best Performance in a Play with her portrayal of Jean Brodie in Muriel Spark's The Prime of Miss Jean Brodie, which was staged at the Royal & Derngate in Northampton. During the period from December 1997 to December 2004 Anna Francolini was a mainstay of London's tiny but influential Bridewell Theatre during the latter part of its decade as a professional venue. In December 1997 to January 1998 she played lead role Helen in the historic fully staged premiere of Stephen Sondheim's Saturday Night. This was to be followed in 1999 by Floyd Collins and later on during 2000-1 Anna appeared in revue shows created from the work of Jason Robert Brown, Adam Guettel and John La Chiusa, one of which, The Cutting Edge transferred to the Donmar Warehouse in 2002. Further Bridewell Theatre work included There's Always A Woman (2002); The Ballard of Little Jo (2003) and an appearance at the venue's 10th Anniversary Farewell Concert on 12 December 2004. Following the demise of the Bridewell Theatre as a professional venue, Anna's other appearances included Caroline, or Change at the National Theatre (2006), Three Sisters on Hope Street at the Liverpool Everyman (2008) and Wolves at the Window at the Arcola Theatre during the same year, which gave her a New York debut at 59E59 in 2009.

In 2010, she played the role of Maria Callas in Martin Sherman's play Onassis at the Novello Theatre. During the following year, Anna played the role of Beatrice in Arthur Miller's A View from the Bridge at Manchester's Royal Exchange, a venue to which she was to return in 2014 as Enid in That Day We Sang. 2012 saw her take the lead role in Victor/Victoria at Southwark Playhouse and in February 2015 she made an appearance in Stephen Sondheim's Assassins at the Menier Chocolate Factory. July 2015, she was part of the premiere cast of Damon Albarn's new musical Wonder.land at the Manchester International Festival which transferred to the National Theatre later during the same year. 25 October 2015 saw Anna make an appearance in Stephen Sondheim's 85th Birthday Tribute Hey Old Friends. In 2016 she appeared as a female Captain Hook at the National Theatre in Peter Pan. From March to October 2018 she appeared in Strictly Ballroom at the Piccadilly Theatre. In April 2023 she appeared in Tom Fool at Richmond's Orange Tree Theatre and in May-June 2024 she played Olivia in Twelfth Night at Regent's Park Open Air Theatre. Her screen credits include the movies Topsy-Turvy and Solo: A Star Wars Story and the TV series Rome, New Tricks and Vera. In 2019, she voiced Gina on Thomas & Friends in the US/UK versions.

== Filmography ==
=== Film ===
Year	Title	Role	Notes
2013	The Christmas Candle	Mrs. Clem	
2015	The Dark Room	Karen	Short film
2018	Solo: A Star Wars Story	Imperial Emigration Officer	Her character was identified as "Falthina Sharest" in tie-ins
2019	The Kill Team	Laura Briggman	
2019	Thomas & Friends: Digs and Discoveries	Gina (voice)	UK & US versions
2023	Indiana Jones and the Dial of Destiny	Mandy	

=== Television ===
Year	Title	Role	Notes
1996	Company	Marta	Television movie
2003	Jonathan Creek	Coral	Episode: "The Coonskin Cap"
2004	Holby City	Zoe Clarke	Episode: "Truth Will Out"
2004	Lie With Me	Anna	Television movie
2005–2007	Rome	Clarissa	8 episodes
2009	Doctors	Jo Reith	Episode: "Playing Away"
2011	EastEnders	Dr. Faye Morrison	2 episodes
2013	Holby City	Helen Levy	Episode: "Break"
2019–2020	Thomas & Friends	Gina (voice)	UK & US versions
2020	Homeland	Dr. Foley	Episode: "Deception Indicated"
2020	Roadkill	HJ Keane	4 Episodes
2022	The Man Who Fell to Earth	Ticket Agent	1 episode
2022	The Ipcress File	Mrs. Dawson	6 episodes
2023	Sweet Sue		
2023	Sex Education	Gloria	Recurring role
2023	The Diplomat	Pippa	2 episodes
2024	Call The Midwife	Gladys Bell	1 episode
2024	Criminal Record	DI Viv Gearing	Recurring role
2024	House of the Dragon	Lady Mallister	Episodes: "Regent" and "The Red Sowing"
