= Regent (House of the Dragon) =

- House of the Dragon episode
- Episode no.: Season 2 Episode 5
- Directed by: Clare Kilner
- Written by: Ti Mikkel
- Cinematography by: Alejandro Martínez
- Editing by: Frances Parker
- Original air date: July 14, 2024
- Running time: 63 minutes

Episode chronology
← Previous "The Red Dragon and the Gold"	Next → "Smallfolk"
- House of the Dragon season 2

"Regent" is the fifth episode of the second season of the fantasy drama television series House of the Dragon, a prequel to Game of Thrones. The episode was written by Ti Mikkel and directed by Clare Kilner. It first aired on HBO and Max on July 14, 2024.

In the episode, Aegon returns to King's Landing severely injured from the battle at Rook's Rest, making him unable to continue ruling as king. The Green Council convenes to decide who will serve as regent during Aegon's recovery, between his mother Alicent and his brother Aemond. Meanwhile, Jacaerys travels to the Twins to seek allegiance from House Frey. Rhaenyra appoints Corlys as her Hand, and Daemon attempts to win over House Bracken.

In the United States, the episode garnered a viewership of 1.2 million during its premiere night on linear television alone. It received generally positive reviews, with critics praising the direction, writing, character development, cast performances (particularly Olivia Cooke, Emma D'Arcy, Matt Smith and Ewan Mitchell), Daemon's scenes in Harrenhal, the smallfolk scenes in King's Landing and the final scene between Rhaenyra and Jacaerys.

== Plot ==
Returning to King's Landing, Criston parades Meleys' severed head through the city, though he is baffled that the smallfolk, starving due to the shipping blockade, do not celebrate the victory. Aegon has survived but is comatose and severely wounded, while Sunfyre is expected to die soon. Criston withholds telling Alicent what part Aemond played in the battle. Alicent nominates herself as regent, but the council instead elect Aemond, primarily due to his sex. Aemond orders the city gates shut just as masses of citizens, including a blacksmith Hugh Hammer and his family, attempt to flee. Later, Helaena confronts Aemond in front of the Iron Throne, asking if it was worth the price.

At Harrenhal, Daemon dreams of incest with his mother and later discloses to Alys he intends to claim the Iron Throne for himself with Rhaenyra by his side. Daemon and Willem Blackwood try to win over House Bracken, but they refuse to yield. Daemon orders the Blackwoods to ravage the Bracken stronghold and lands, which aggravates other Riverlords who denounce Daemon as tyrant and refuse support.

At the Eyrie, Lady Jeyne Arryn is displeased at not receiving an adult dragon to protect the Vale as promised in exchange for sheltering Rhaenyra's youngest sons. Rhaena tries to reason with her, unsuccessfully, and expresses her own frustration over not having a dragon.

Without Rhaenyra's knowledge, Jace meets Lord Forrest Frey and his wife, Lady Sabitha, who control a major crossing between the north and the south of the Seven Kingdoms. Promising them lordship over Harrenhal, Jace obtains their allegiance and pass for the troops from the North.

Rhaenyra sends Baela to Driftmark to ask Corlys to be her Hand. Mourning Rhaenys, Corlys initially refuses, but Baela persuades him.

On Dragonstone, Rhaenyra admits to her council her lack of experience in warfare, but points out the same fault in them, considering they lived through the two peaceful reigns of Kings Viserys and Jaehaerys. On Mysaria's advice, Rhaenyra sends her maid Elinda Massey to King's Landing as a spy; she also dispatches a council member Ser Alfred Broome to Harrenhal to confer with Daemon.

Initially frustrated by Jace's disobedience, Rhaenyra praises him for his success with the Freys. They conclude their only hope against Vhagar are Dragonstone's two large dragons, Vermithor and Silverwing, both without riders. Jace suggests potential dragonriders may be found in other noble houses due to earlier Targaryens marrying into them. Rhaenyra is skeptical, but decides to search Dragonstone's genealogical records.

== Production ==
=== Writing and filming ===
"Regent" was written by Ti Mikkel, marking her first time as writer for the series. The title of the episode refers to the regent position discussed by the Green Council to fill the vacancy on the Iron Throne resulting from King Aegon Targaryen's inability to rule due to his severe injury in the battle at Rook's Rest.

The episode was directed by Clare Kilner. It marks her fifth directorial credit for the series, following "King of the Narrow Sea", "We Light the Way", "The Green Council", and "Rhaenyra the Cruel".

=== Casting ===
The episode stars Matt Smith as Prince Daemon Targaryen, Emma D'Arcy as Queen Rhaenyra Targaryen, Olivia Cooke as Queen Dowager Alicent Hightower, Steve Toussaint as Lord Corlys Velaryon, Fabien Frankel as Ser Criston Cole, Matthew Needham as Lord Larys "Clubfoot" Strong, Sonoya Mizuno as Mysaria, Tom Glynn-Carney as King Aegon II Targaryen, Ewan Mitchell as Prince Aemond Targaryen, Phia Saban as Queen Helaena Targaryen, Harry Collett as Prince Jacaerys Velaryon, Bethany Antonia as Lady Baela Targaryen, Phoebe Campbell as Lady Rhaena Targaryen, Jefferson Hall as Ser Tyland Lannister, Freddie Fox as Ser Gwayne Hightower, Gayle Rankin as Alys Rivers, Kurt Egyiawan as Grand Maester Orwyle, Kieran Bew as Hugh Hammer, Ellora Torchia as Kat, and Simon Russell Beale as Ser Simon Strong.

Nanna Blondell once again made a brief appearance, following the previous episode, to reprise her role as Daemon's second wife Laena Velaryon. The episode also introduced several new co-starring cast members, including Amanda Collin as the Lady of the Eyrie and head of House Arryn, Lady Jeyne Arryn; Kenneth Collard as Forrest Frey, the Lord of the Crossing and head of House Frey; and Sarah Woodward as his wife Lady Sabitha Frey. Additionally, Emeline Lambert made a brief appearance in Daemon's dream sequence as his and Viserys' mother, Princess Alyssa Targaryen.

== Reception ==
=== Ratings ===
In the United States, "Regent" was watched by an estimated 1.2 million viewers during its first broadcast on HBO alone on July 14, 2024. This was a 0.6% decrease from the previous episode.

=== Critical response ===
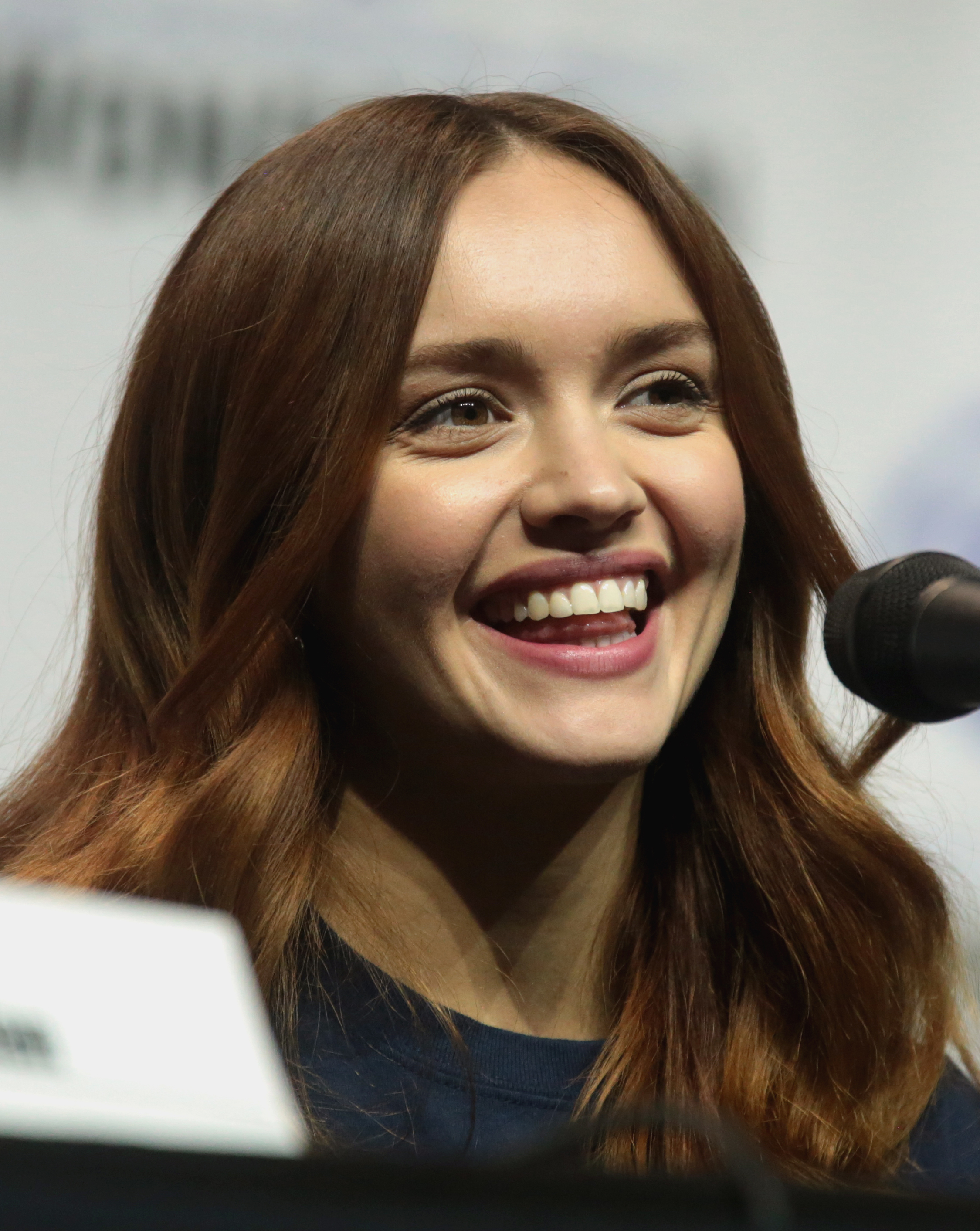
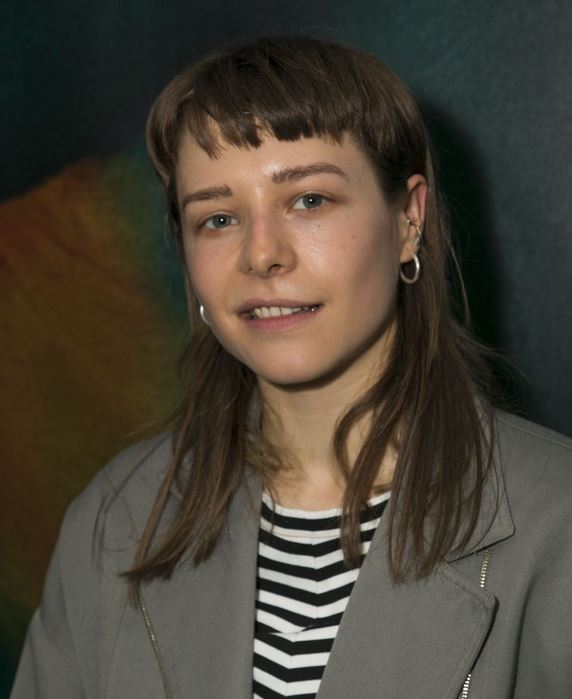
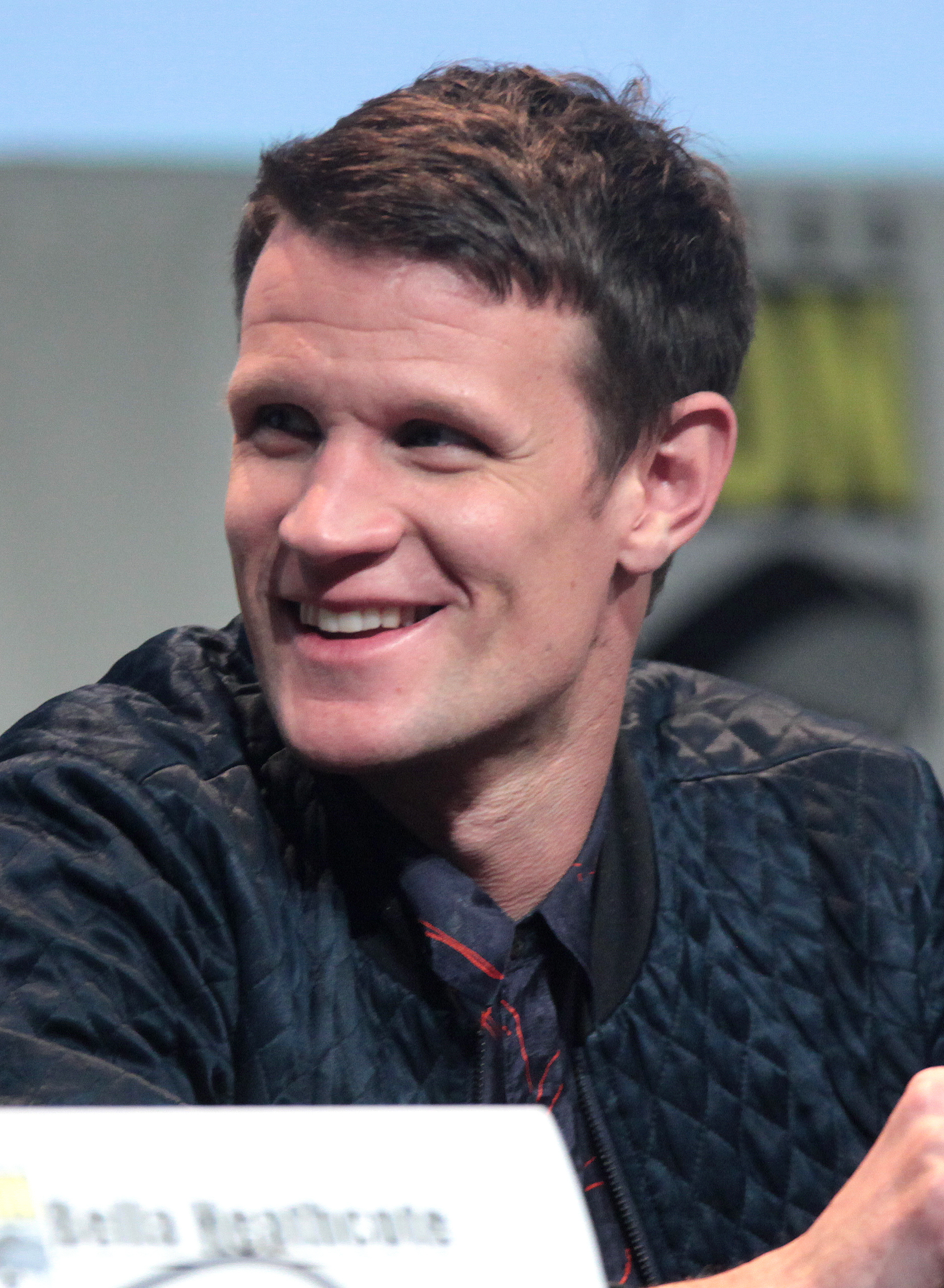
The performances of (top, L to R) Olivia Cooke, Emma D'Arcy, Ewan Mitchell, and Matt Smith were met with critical praise.

The episode was met with generally positive critical reviews. On the review aggregator Rotten Tomatoes, it holds an approval rating of 90% based on 20 reviews, with an average rating of 6.7/10. The site's critical consensus says, "Clearing the air after the previous episode's blockbuster cliffhanger, 'Regent' reshuffles the status quo to intriguing effect."

Alec Bojalad of Den of Geek awarded the episode with a perfect 5 out of 5 stars rating, commenting that the episode "proves that House of the Dragon's quieter moments are often every bit as powerful as the draconic destruction. [...] While [it] doesn't feature anything on the same kinetic level of [the battle at Rook's Rest], it's still among the most narratively tight and thematically consistent hours of the series thus far." It received a 4 out of 5 stars from Amanda Whiting of Vulture and Jonathon Wilson of Ready Steady Cut, 3.5 out of 5 stars from James Hunt of Screen Rant, 3.15 out of 5 stars from Haley Whitmire White of TV Fanatic, and 3 out of 5 stars from Fay Watson of GamesRadar+. Wilson summarized his review by saying, "[The series] settles down after a wild episode, as 'Regent' works through the consequences of the Battle At Rook’s Rest." Hunt remarked, "This was another intriguing installment of [the series], with plenty of strong character work within." Watson wrote, "All in all, [the episode] has its moments, but it is too often repetitive and slow to live up to the lofty heights of battles and dragon fire we've had so far."

Helen O'Hara of IGN scored it 8 out of 10, stating "It's yet another plotting and waiting episode of House of the Dragon. [...] Still, there is some forward momentum and a sense that it's reckoning with events. Kayleigh Dray of The A.V. Club graded it with a "B-" and said "All in all, [the episode] is solid but somewhat anticlimactic in the wake of last week's big battle sequence." Proma Khosla of IndieWire gave it a "C", saying that the episode "reeks of requisite yet plain table-setting after last week's major battle sequence." Reviewing the episode for Forbes, Erik Kain wrote in his verdict: "What House of the Dragon does very, very well is somehow stuff this insane amount of story into a single episode, hopping from one character or group of characters to the next, so effortlessly. It's a lot to take in, but it's never hard to understand or follow. This wasn't an action-packed episode like last week's, but a ton of really important things took place as the Greens and Blacks left Rook's Rest licking their wounds and preparing for whatever comes next."

The performances of the cast received wide praise from critics, particularly those of Cooke, D'Arcy, Smith and Mitchell. James Hunt called Smith's performance "superb", while Haley Whitmire White described D'Arcy's performance as "stellar", adding, "They proved once again that they can flawlessly portray a wide range of emotions and concepts. In the span of an hour, they covered grief, anger, frustration, and grace." Fay Watson praised Cooke for masterfully handling the frustration, despair, and rage of her character, while Erik Kain lauded the presence that Mitchell brings to the role of Aemond.

Several critics singled out the final scene, the parallel between Rhaenyra and Alicent in fighting to maintain their voice in their respective small councils, the smallfolk scenes in King's Landing, and the character development of Aemond and Jacaerys as the episode's highlights. Other aspects lauded by critics included Kilner's direction, Mikkel's writing, prosthetic makeup and special effects, as well as the Harrenhal scenes, which one reviewer regarded as the standout storyline. However, the lack of screentime for Corlys to portray his grief over losing Rhaenys received criticism.
