= The Red Dragon and the Gold =

- House of the Dragon episode
- Episode no.: Season 2 Episode 4
- Directed by: Alan Taylor
- Written by: Ryan Condal
- Cinematography by: P.J. Dillon
- Editing by: Katie Weiland
- Original air date: July 7, 2024
- Running time: 55 minutes

Guest appearance
- Milly Alcock as young Rhaenyra Targaryen

Episode chronology
← Previous "The Burning Mill"	Next → "Regent"
- House of the Dragon season 2

"The Red Dragon and the Gold" is the fourth episode of the second season of the fantasy drama television series House of the Dragon, a prequel to Game of Thrones. Its title refers to Meleys and Sunfyre, the dragons of Rhaenys and Aegon, respectively. The episode was written by series co-creator and showrunner Ryan Condal and directed by executive producer Alan Taylor. It first aired on HBO and Max on July 7, 2024.

In the episode, Ser Criston continues to rally Greens allies and executes Black supporters. He rides to Rook's Rest to attack the last Black stronghold on the Blackwater Bay. Meanwhile, Rhaenyra returns to Dragonstone and learns about Criston's plan. She agrees to send Rhaenys with her dragon Meleys to confront Criston and his troops. Feeling his council disrespects him, especially after discovering Aemond's secret communications with Criston, Aegon decides to fly to Rook's Rest with his dragon Sunfyre. Unbeknownst to each other, Rhaenys, Aegon, and Aemond (with Vhagar) converge on Rook's Rest, leading to a climactic battle involving the three dragons.

In the United States, "The Red Dragon and the Gold" gained a viewership of 8.1 million during its premiere night, surpassing the season premiere, with 1.2 million viewers on linear television alone. The episode received widespread acclaim from critics, with many dubbing it one of the series' best outputs. They complimented the direction and visual effects, but particularly the episode's writing for Daemon's scenes in Harrenhal, the increasing friction between Aemond and Aegon, and the Rook's Rest battle sequence, the latter of which was considered the episode's highlight. Acting performances of Eve Best, Matt Smith and Tom Glynn-Carney were a subject of praise.

The episode marks the final appearance of Eve Best (Rhaenys Targaryen).

== Plot ==
At Harrenhal, Daemon dreams about decapitating a young Rhaenyra. Her severed head accuses him of treason. When awake, Daemon meets Alys Rivers, a mysterious woman and a bastard of House Strong. She claims Harrenhal is haunted because weirwood trees were cut to build it. After drinking her sleep potion, Daemon experiences missing time and hallucinates seeing his late wife, Laena Velaryon. An adolescent Lord Oscar Tully arrives at Harrenhal to meet with Daemon on behalf of his aged grandfather, Lord Grover Tully. He hesitates making any decisions for the Riverlands while Grover still lives. Ser Willem Blackwood, one of Rhaenyra's former suitors and a vassal of House Tully, also meets with Daemon. He pledges an army in exchange for subjugating House Bracken.

On Driftmark, Rhaenys meets Alyn, thanking him for rescuing Corlys, and later implies to her husband she knows Alyns is his illegitimate son. She suggests to Corlys to not hide Alyn away. Together, the couple leave for Dragonstone to help steer Rhaenyra's small council.

Off the coast of Blackwater Bay, Criston Cole sacks Duskendale and beheads its lord for refusing to renounce Rhaenyra. Criston orders his troops to seize Rook's Rest, the last Black stronghold in Blackwater Bay. In King's Landing, Grand Maester Orwyle prepares an abortifacient tea for Alicent, who claims it is for someone else. Larys arrives and notices and through Alicent's denial, he implies he knows about her affair.

Aegon learns that Criston and Aemond planned military advancements towards Duskendale and Rook's Rest without his knowledge, letting Daemon seize Harrenhal. He lashes out at Aemond and Larys, but Aemond humiliates him in front of the small council. Aegon vents his anger out at Alicent, who merely dismisses him, berating his lack of experience and advising him to step aside and let others wage the war in his stead. Frustrated and drunk, Aegon flies to Rook's Rest on his dragon Sunfyre.

At Dragonstone, during Rhaenyra's absence, her council concurs that a dragon should be sent to defend Rook's Rest. Rhaenyra returns, reporting on her meeting with Alicent and agreeing that war is inevitable. Jace wants to go to Rook's Rest, but Rhaenyra insists on flying herself. Rhaenys volunteers, however, arguing her dragon Meleys is the most capable. As Rhaenys departs, Rhaenyra passes on the prophecy of Aegon the Conqueror to Jace.

Criston's troops advance on Rook's Rest and face the castle's archers. Rhaenys arrives on Meleys and begins burning the Greens' men and siege equipment. Having laid a trap, Criston signals Aemond who's hidden nearby with Vhagar. Aemond, however, spots Aegon approaching and delays action. Meleys confronts and mauls Sunfyre. Aemond charges with Vhagar and commands her to burn both dragons, harming mainly Aegon and Sunfyre, incapacitating them both. Rhaenys and Meleys then attack Vhagar and Aemond and send them crashing to the ground. Rhaenys shuns the opportunity to flee, but is ambushed by Vhagar who fatally crushes Meleys' neck. Rhaenys, strapped to Meleys, plummets to her death.

After the battle, Criston finds Aemond with his sword drawn near Aegon, who lies motionless next to the heavily wounded Sunfyre.

== Production ==
=== Writing and filming ===
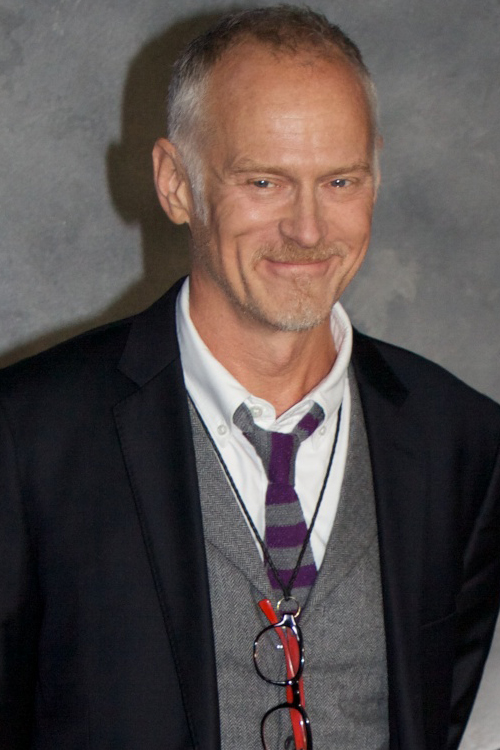
"The Red Dragon and the Gold" marks Alan Taylor's second directorial credit in the series and ninth in the overall Game of Thrones franchise.

"The Red Dragon and the Gold" was written by series co-creator and showrunner Ryan Condal, and directed by executive producer Alan Taylor, making it their second collaboration in the series after the season premiere "A Son for a Son". The title of the episode refers to the color of Meleys and Sunfyre, Rhaenys' and Aegon's dragons, respectively, as well as the heraldic dragons that adorn the banners of the warring Green and Black factions.

The episode marks Condal's sixth writing credit for the series, following "The Heirs of the Dragon", "The Rogue Prince", "Second of His Name", "The Black Queen", and the season premiere. It also marks Taylor's second time as director for the series and ninth for the overall franchise. He previously directed the Game of Thrones episodes "Baelor", "Fire and Blood", "The North Remembers", "The Night Lands", "The Prince of Winterfell", "Valar Morghulis", and "Beyond the Wall". In an interview with The A.V. Club, Taylor said he is not returning for the series' third season, making the episode his last directorial work in the franchise.

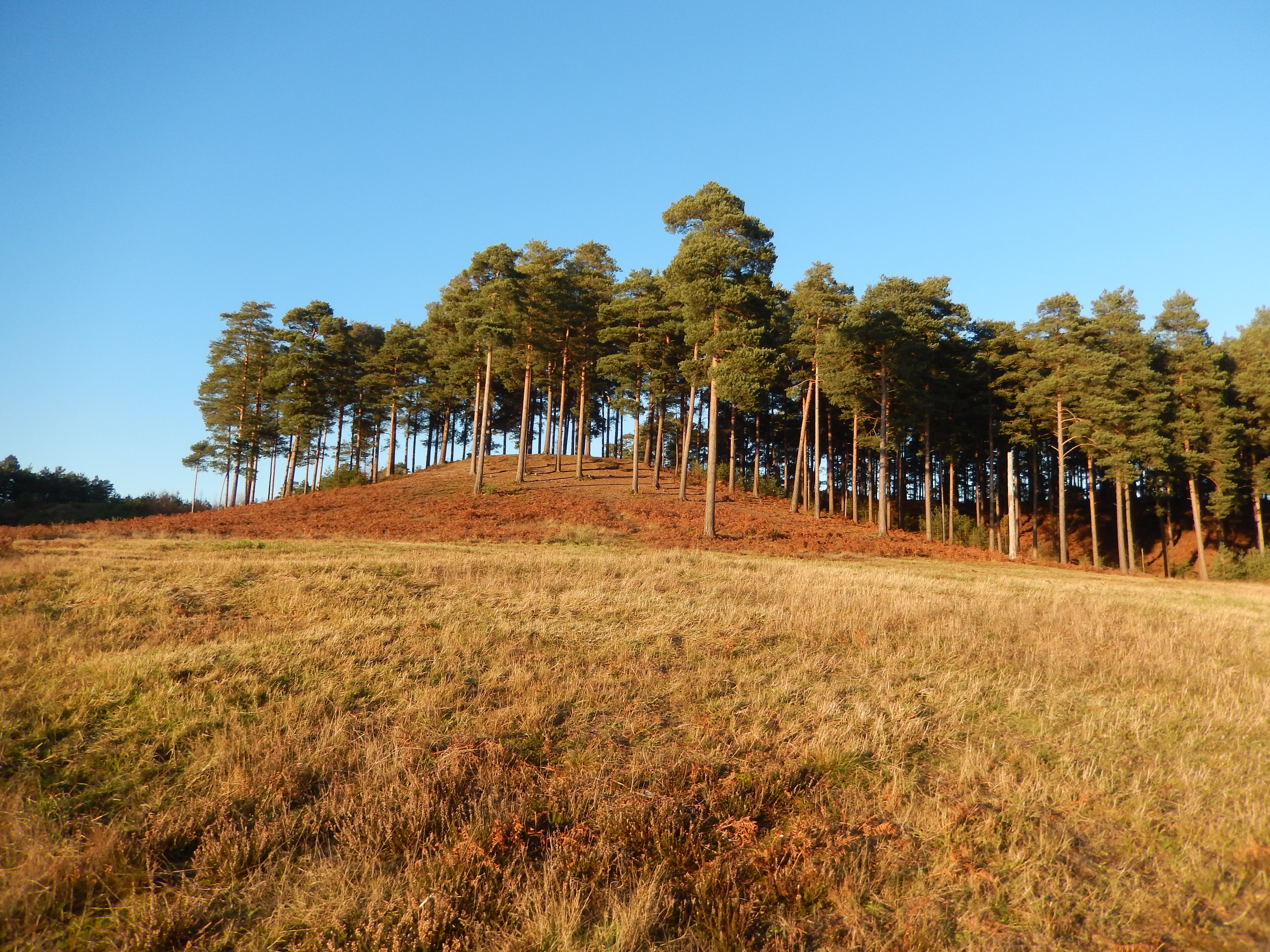
Bourne Wood, Surrey, England was used as the location for the battle at Rook's Rest.

Principal photography for the second season began in April 2023 and wrapped in September 2023. The opening scene of Daemon dreaming about talking to young Rhaenyra in the Throne room was the first scene shot of the season, filmed in April. The battle at Rook's Rest was filmed in Bourne Wood, Surrey, England in August. Condal described the battle sequence as "the biggest thing that [the series] has mounted to date in terms of the size and expense of a set piece." Taylor collaborated with storyboard artist Jane Wu to design the entire battle sequence. According to the episode's cinematographer P.J. Dillon, the dragon fight in the sky was shot using a mix of a volume and a blue screen.

In an interview with Business Insider, Eve Best (Rhaenys) revealed that her scenes during the battle sequence took two weeks to film. She also mentioned to Variety that Tom Glynn-Carney (Aegon) and Ewan Mitchell (Aemond) each spent a week to film their scenes. Discussing Rhaenys' "heroic" decision and final fate, Best said it fulfilled one of her desires for the character. As Erica Gonzales noted in Elle, Best said of Rhaenys, "She's stepping up to sacrifice herself because I think she knows absolutely damn well that this is a kamikaze mission. In this moment, I think there’s an unspoken but very important moment of acceptance and honoring. It's very samurai, actually. It's an honor between the two women, which up until now has always been very complicated."

=== Casting ===
The episode stars Matt Smith as Prince Daemon Targaryen, Emma D'Arcy as Queen Rhaenyra Targaryen, Olivia Cooke as Queen Dowager Alicent Hightower, Steve Toussaint as Lord Corlys Velaryon, Eve Best as Princess Rhaenys Targaryen, Fabien Frankel as Ser Criston Cole, Sonoya Mizuno as Mysaria, Matthew Needham as Lord Larys "Clubfoot" Strong, Tom Glynn-Carney as King Aegon II Targaryen, Ewan Mitchell as Prince Aemond Targaryen, Harry Collett as Prince Jacaerys Velaryon, Bethany Antonia as Lady Baela Targaryen, Jefferson Hall as Ser Tyland Lannister, Freddie Fox as Ser Gwayne Hightower, Gayle Rankin as Alys Rivers, Kurt Egyiawan as Grand Maester Orwyle, Abubakar Salim as Alyn of Hull, and Simon Russell Beale as Ser Simon Strong.

Milly Alcock once again guest-starred to reprise her role as young Rhaenyra Targaryen after the previous episode, appearing in Daemon's dream sequence. Nanna Blondell also returned as Daemon's second wife Laena Velaryon, appearing in his vision. Blondell made her first appearance in the first season episode "The Princess and the Queen".

Following the death of Rhaenys Targaryen in the battle at Rook's Rest, the episode marks Best's final appearance in the series. Additionally, it marks the first appearance of Archie Barnes as Oscar Tully, as well as first and only appearance of Steven Pacey as the Lord of Duskendale and head of House Darklyn, Gunthor Darklyn. The episode also features the return of Willem Blackwood, originally portrayed by Alfie Todd in "King of the Narrow Sea", now portrayed by Jack Parry-Jones as an adult.

== Reception ==
=== Ratings ===
In the United States, "The Red Dragon and the Gold" was watched by a total of 8.1 million viewers, which included linear viewers during its premiere night on July 7, 2024, both on HBO and Max, surpassing the season premiere, which gained a viewership of 7.8 million. While on HBO alone, it was watched by an estimated 1.2 million viewers during its first broadcast. This was an increase of 6.8% from the previous episode.

=== Critical response ===
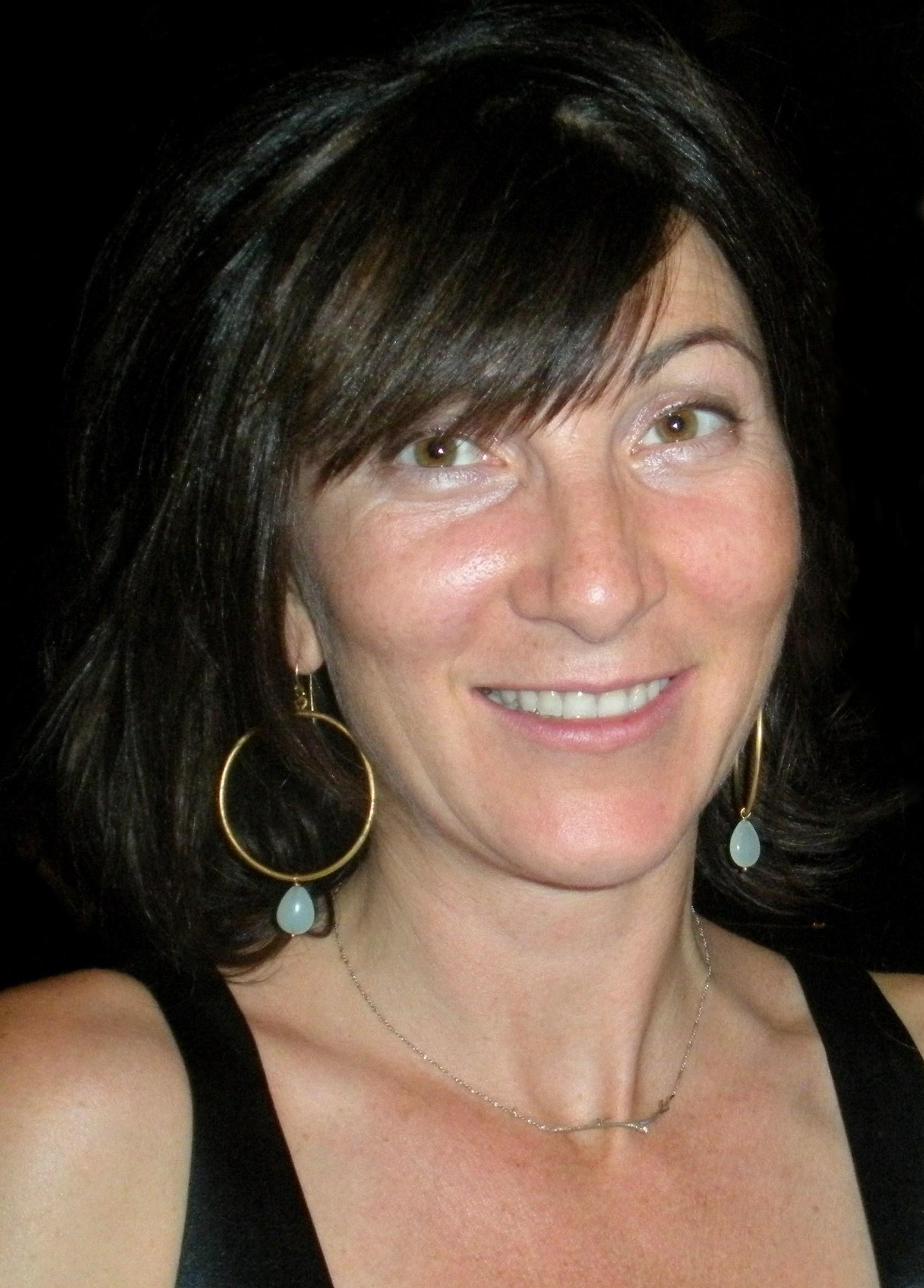
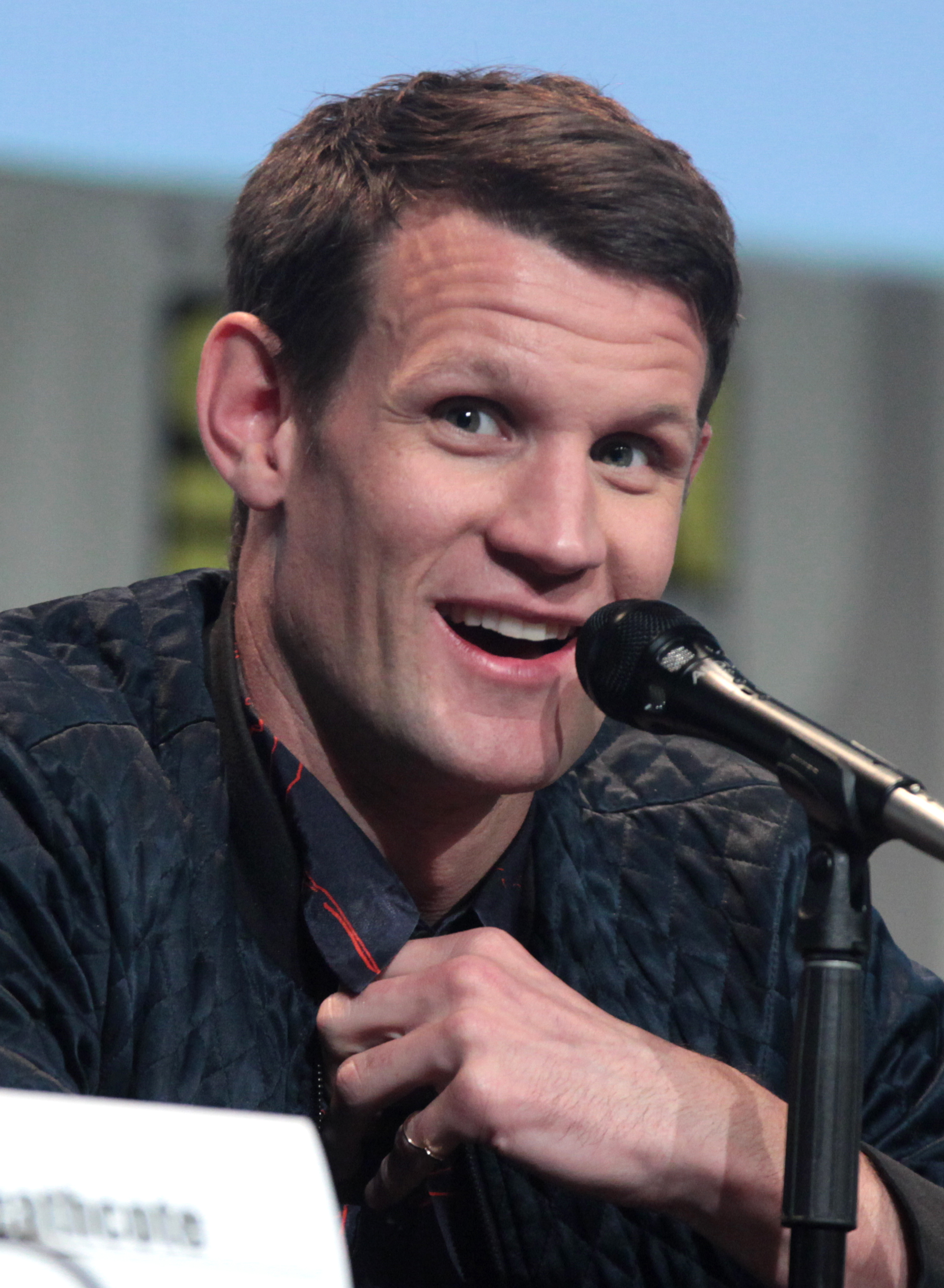
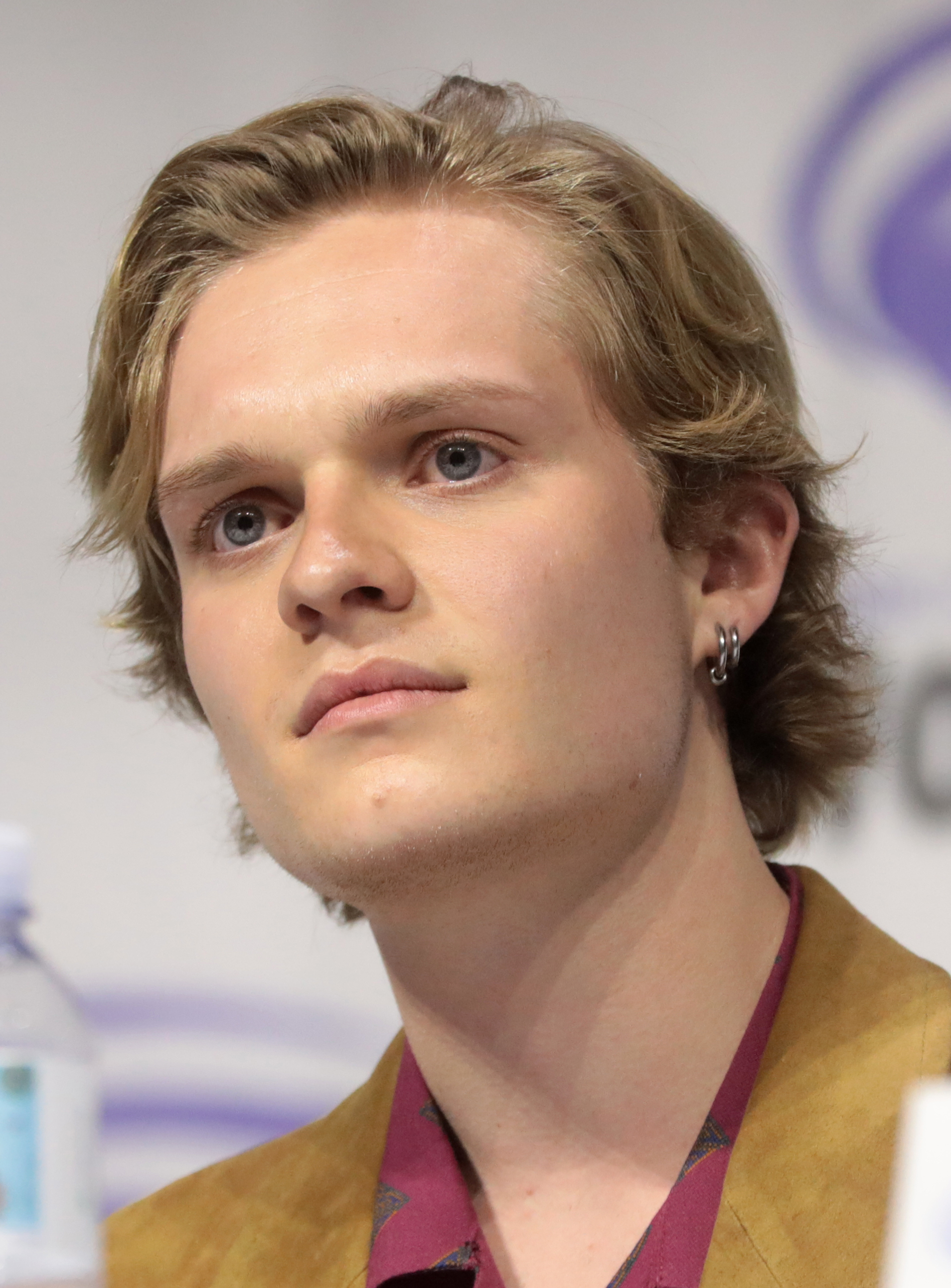
The performances of Eve Best, Matt Smith, and Tom Glynn-Carney were met with critical praise.

The episode was met with widespread acclaim from both critics and viewers, with some critics calling it one of the best episodes of the series and the best of the season so far. On the review aggregator Rotten Tomatoes, it holds an approval rating of 100% based on 23 reviews, with an average rating of 9.1/10, making it the highest-rated episode of the series and the only episode with a 100% rating to date. The site's critical consensus says, "Culminating in House of the Dragon's most spectacular and vicious set piece yet, 'The Red Dragon and the Gold' is a midpoint highlight of the season." The episode had received a 9.7 out of 10 score on IMDb for several days after its release, making it the series' highest-rated episode on the website. As of May 12, 2025, it holds a rating of 9.4/10.

It earned a perfect 5 out of 5 stars from both Alec Bojalad of Den of Geek and Haley Whitmire White of TV Fanatic. Bojalad remarked, "Impressively, [it] makes the already-strong episode 3 even better in context." White described it as "one of the most spectacular and visually stunning displays that we've seen on television in a long time." James Hunt of Screen Rant rated it with 4.5 out of 5 stars, praising it as "a brilliant installment that evokes Game of Thrones at its most spectacular". Jonathon Wilson of Ready Steady Cut also gave it a 4.5 out of 5 stars rating, and wrote in his summary: "Episode 4 gets the Dance of Dragons underway with real style." Meanwhile, Amanda Whiting of Vulture and Benji Wilson of The Telegraph both rated it with 4 out of 5 stars.

Helen O'Hara of IGN awarded the episode a perfect 10 out of 10 score, calling it a "masterpiece". She wrote, "[The episode] starts slowly but builds up steam, finishing with a spectacular battle that ranks up there with the most thrilling moments of Game of Thrones and blows away anything so far in House of the Dragon." Katie Doll of CBR and Carly Lane of Collider both scored it 9 out of 10. Doll noted, "[The episode] changes the course of House of the Dragon Season 2 by finally moving the plot out of its stagnant place in every single scene." Kayleigh Dray of The A.V. Club graded it with an "A" and called it a "magnificent" episode. Erik Kain of Forbes described it as "yet another terrific episode in what's shaping up to be a great second season." Josh Rosenberg of Esquire viewed it as "a return to the franchise's glory days."

Critics singled out the Battle at Rook's Rest as the highlight of the episode. Alec Bojalad specifically wrote, "The resulting aerial battle above Rook's Rest in the Crownlands is as awesome and terrifying as its outcome is predictable. Two dragons perish, at least one dragonrider dies, and countless men-at-arms are either crushed under the beasts gait or vaporized by their fiery breath." James Hunt praised the sequence for blending epic scale with a strong character foundation. O'Hara dubbed it "epic fantasy at its most thrilling". Doll said that the sequence "surpasses expectations in a stomach-churning example of blockbuster television." She also considered it one of the greatest fight scenes in television history and called the episode the most beautiful work in the series so far.

Other aspects lauded by critics included the visual effects, stunts, acting, with particular praise for the performances of Best, Smith, Glynn-Carney, Mitchell, and Rankin. There was also praise towards Dillon's cinematography, Djawadi's score, Condal's writing, Taylor's direction, with Helen O'Hara noting his skill in shifting between political machinations and outright warfare, as well as Daemon's scenes in Harrenhal, and the increased sibling rivalry between Aemond and Aegon.

=== Accolades ===
Year	Award	Category	Nominee(s)	Result	Ref.
2025	Costume Designers Guild Awards	Excellence in Sci-Fi/Fantasy Television	Caroline McCall	Nominated	
2025	Visual Effects Society Awards	Outstanding Virtual Cinematography in a CG Project	Matt Perrin, James Thompson, Jacob Doehner, P.J. Dillon	Nominated	
2025	Visual Effects Society Awards	Outstanding Visual Effects in a Photoreal Episode	Daði Einarsson, Tom Horton, Sven Martin, Wayne Stables, Mike Dawson	Nominated	
