= Smallfolk =

- House of the Dragon episode
- Episode no.: Season 2 Episode 6
- Directed by: Andrij Parekh
- Written by: Eileen Shim
- Cinematography by: Vanja Cernjul
- Editing by: Adam Bosman
- Original air date: July 21, 2024
- Running time: 67 minutes

Guest appearance
- Paddy Considine as Viserys I Targaryen (uncredited)

Episode chronology
← Previous "Regent"	Next → "The Red Sowing"
- House of the Dragon season 2

"Smallfolk" is the sixth episode of the second season of the fantasy drama television series House of the Dragon, a prequel to Game of Thrones. The episode was written by Eileen Shim and directed by Andrij Parekh. It first aired on HBO and Max on July 21, 2024.

In the episode, Aemond orders Criston to march on Harrenhal, dismisses Alicent from the Green Council, and instructs Larys to summon Otto Hightower back. Meanwhile, Rhaenyra searches for someone with Targaryen ancestry to become Seasmoke's new rider. Addam of Hull is later chosen by Seasmoke himself. Mysaria sends Targaryen-bannered boats carrying food to King's Landing, earning the smallfolk's praise for Rhaenyra.

In the United States, the episode achieved a viewership of nearly 1.3 million during its premiere night on linear television alone. It received highly positive reviews from critics, with praise going towards the direction, writing, score, character development, Paddy Considine's guest return as Viserys, the riot in King's Landing, and cast performances (especially Ewan Mitchell, Emma D'Arcy and Matthew Needham).

== Plot ==
In the Westerlands, Lord Jason Lannister leads his army to the Golden Tooth, meeting his vassal Lord Humfrey Lefford, who expects their joined forces to march to Harrenhal. Jason, however, wants to wait for Aemond and Vhagar, as they need a dragon to combat Daemon's dragon, Caraxes. Dismissing Jason Lannister's request for protection, Aemond plans to ally with the Triarchy leaders to break the Velaryon shipping blockade. He also orders Criston to accompany Hightower troops to Harrenhal and dismisses Alicent from the Small Council, diminishing her influence. Aemond sternly rebuffs Larys' suggestion to be appointed Hand of the King and orders him to summon his grandfather, Otto Hightower, back to court.

Aemond visits Aegon and presses his brother regarding what he remembers about the battle at Rook's Rest; Aegon claims he has no recollection. Larys also visits Aegon, truthfully saying the king is permanently handicapped but retains his mind. He tells Aegon he can use his disability as an advantage by allowing others to underestimate him, just as Larys himself has done. He warns that Aegon's life is in danger while Aemond is prince regent. Aegon asks for Larys' help. As Gwayne is about to leave for Harrenhal with Criston's troops, Alicent asks about her youngest son, Daeron, who resides in Oldtown. Gwayne says that the teenaged Daeron is stalwart, clever, and, unlike his brothers, also kind. This pleases Alicent, who harbors regrets about her parenting choices.

Mysaria's agents spread rumors that the royals regularly feast while the smallfolk starve. When Larys informs Aemond about the growing unrest, he cannot understand why citizens blame them rather than Rhaenyra, who ordered the blockade. Larys explains that the Crown is expected to provide for the smallfolk. Mysaria sends food-laden boats bearing Rhaenyra's banners to King's Landing. The people openly praise Rhaenyra but fight each other for the limited supplies. Leaving the sept after prayers, Alicent and Helaena are swarmed by starving rioters. When a man grabs Alicent, a Kingsguard severs his arm, though Alicent orders the guards to sheathe their swords. The queens escape unharmed, but smallfolk overwhelm several guards.

Needing more dragonriders, Rhaenyra asks Ser Steffon Darklyn, who has distant Targaryen ancestry, to attempt to claim Seasmoke, Laenor Velaryon's dragon. Knowing the risk, Steffon agrees to try. Seemingly receptive at first, Seasmoke lashes out and burns Steffon and a dragonkeeper to death. When Lord Bartimos Celtigar criticizes Rhaenyra, she slaps him and proclaims she has allowed others to forget to fear her. When Jacaerys later queries his mother about the incident, Rhaenyra laments her passivity in the war. Walking through the Vale, Rhaena notices scorched earth and charred animal carcasses, indicating a nearby dragon. When she mentions it to Lady Jeyne Arryn at the Eeyrie, she claims a wild dragon roams the area. Jeyne also announces that Prince Reggio of Pentos answered Rhaena's letter and has agreed to shelter Rhaena and Rhaenyra's youngest sons, Aegon and Viserys. Preparations are underway for their departure.

At Harrenhal, Daemon continues having fitful dreams, including one about his brother, Viserys. Disturbed by the ghostly images, Daemon fears his mind is being manipulated with poison and suspects Ser Simon Strong. He prepares to leave until Alys advises he wait and do nothing, foreseeing that conditions may change in a few days. She says House Tully is the most stable and key to allying the Riverlands, though Daemon counters that Lord Grover Tully is unable to negotiate in his diminished state. Soon afterwards, Ser Simon announces that Lord Tully has died, Alys being the last person to treat him. Grover's death makes his grandson, Oscar, the Lord of Riverrun and Lord Paramount of the Riverlands.

On Driftmark, Corlys appoints Alyn as the first mate of his flagship. Alyn keeps his head shaved and covered to hide his white hair and familial connection. While Addam is on the beach, Seasmoke appears overhead, causing panic. The dragon fixates on Addam and chases him before finally landing. A terrified Addam cowers against an embankment as Seasmoke slowly approaches, sniffing at him. Back on Dragonstone, Rhaenyra tells Mysaria that she and Daemon lack traits that the other possesses, making each one half of a whole. Mysaria reveals details about her traumatic past, sexual abuse, and why she is loyal to Rhaenyra. Mysaria's words move Rhaenyra and the two kiss passionately. They are then interrupted by news that Seasmoke has been spotted with a rider. Rhaenyra believes it may be a Green ally and immediately leaves on Syrax to confront them.

== Production ==
=== Writing and filming ===
"Smallfolk" was written by Eileen Shim and directed by Andrij Parekh, marking Shim's second time as writer for the series, following "The Lord of the Tides", and Parekh's first directorial credit. The title of the episode refers to the common people of King's Landing who starve due to the Blacks' shipping blockade and riot against the Greens.

=== Casting ===
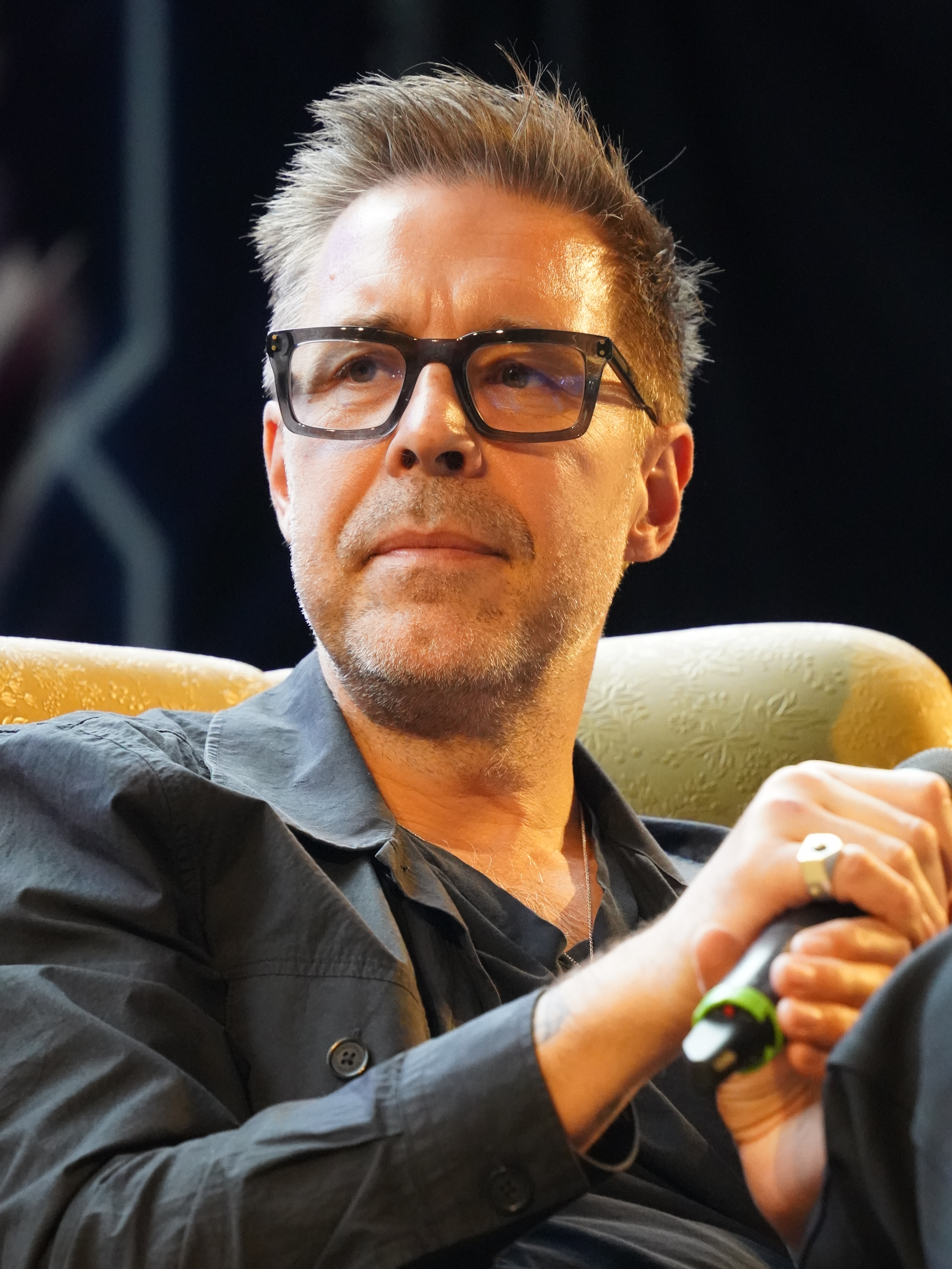
Paddy Considine returned as King Viserys Targaryen in the episode.

The episode stars Matt Smith as Prince Daemon Targaryen, Emma D'Arcy as Queen Rhaenyra Targaryen, Olivia Cooke as Queen Dowager Alicent Hightower, Steve Toussaint as Lord Corlys Velaryon, Fabien Frankel as Ser Criston Cole, Matthew Needham as Lord Larys "Clubfoot" Strong, Sonoya Mizuno as Mysaria, Tom Glynn-Carney as King Aegon II Targaryen, Ewan Mitchell as Prince Aemond Targaryen, Phia Saban as Queen Helaena Targaryen, Harry Collett as Prince Jacaerys Velaryon, Phoebe Campbell as Lady Rhaena Targaryen, Jefferson Hall as Ser Tyland Lannister and Lord Jason Lannister, Freddie Fox as Ser Gwayne Hightower, Gayle Rankin as Alys Rivers, Abubakar Salim as Alyn of Hull, Clinton Liberty as Addam of Hull, Kurt Egyiawan as Grand Maester Orwyle, Kieran Bew as Hugh Hammer, Ellora Torchia as Kat, Tom Bennett as Ulf White, and Simon Russell Beale as Ser Simon Strong.

Paddy Considine returned as King Viserys Targaryen, though his appearance is uncredited. Siân Brooke also made a brief appearance, reprising her role as Viserys' wife Aemma. Both characters appear in Daemon's visions. The episode marks the final appearance of recurring character Ser Steffon Darklyn (Anthony Flanagan).

== Reception ==
=== Ratings ===
In the United States, "Smallfolk" was watched by nearly 1.3 million viewers during its first broadcast on HBO alone on July 21, 2024. This was a 5.1% increase from the previous episode, which was watched by an estimated 1.2 million viewers.

=== Critical response ===
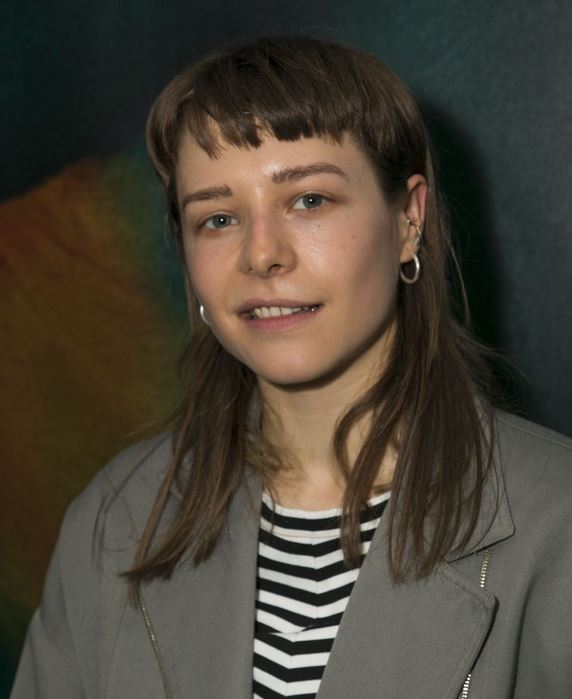
The performances of Ewan Mitchell and Emma D'Arcy in the episode garnered critical acclaim.

"Smallfolk" was met with highly positive critical reviews. On the review aggregator Rotten Tomatoes, it holds an approval rating of 89% based on 18 reviews, with an average rating of 8/10. The site's critical consensus says, "Taking stock of how dynastic war impacts the people who don't sit on thrones, 'Smallfolk' effectively fleshes out the characters existing on the margins -- while feeling a bit like a detour."

Brynna Arens of Den of Geek gave the episode 4 out of 5 stars, stating, "Like most episodes of House of the Dragon this season, episode 6 has a lot going on. While it can be easy to get bogged down by the ever-revolving door of new and recurring characters, this installment at least keeps things moving fairly quickly, reminding us who these people are and why we should even care about them in the first place." Also giving it 4 out of 5 stars, Jonathon Wilson of Ready Steady Cut wrote in his verdict: "'Smallfolk' is packed with strong character moments but is light on big developments. Some will (incorrectly) consider it filler, but it's a great showcase for the cast and the writers." Haley Whitmire White of TV Fanatic also rated it 4 out of 5 stars, commenting, "It was, overall, a great episode. There wasn't much action, but that's because everyone is strategizing and preparing for, well, fire and blood."

James Hunt of Screen Rant gave it 3.5 out of 5 stars, noting "[The episode] continues the fallout from Rook's Rest and the gradual build to the finale with another solid, if unspectacular, outing. [It] has settled back into the same slower, early season rhythm [...], but that's not a bad thing. There's some intriguing setup and strong character development in King's Landing, Harrenhal, and on Dragonstone, although not everything works." Also giving it 3.5 out of 5 stars, Fay Watson of GamesRadar+ summarized her review by saying, "The latest episode keeps the well-trod routine of council bickering and strange visions, but interesting character choices set up a tantalizing end to the season."

Kayleigh Dray of The A.V. Club graded it with an "A", commenting, "All in all, it’s another excellent episode of House Of The Dragon. There are a lot of big dialogue-heavy scenes, which the series is fast becoming known for, and just enough action to keep anyone craving an adrenaline hit happy." Helen O'Hara of IGN scored it 9 out of 10, writing, "A strikingly well-written episode with some beautifully drawn moments of interpersonal drama. While it's lovely to see Paddy Considine return briefly, it's even better to see this season's cast firing on all cylinders with a script that fully supports them. This episode doesn't have one of those spectacular water-cooler moments that would earn it full marks, but it's a spectacularly crafted piece of television that delivers on the promise of this world." Erik Kain of Forbes said "All told, another fantastic and gripping episode of [the series] which manages to be fascinating and compelling even without large-scale dragon battles or battles of any kind."

The performances of the cast were met with critical praise, with Fay Watson saying, "No one can doubt that this is a cast that'll do justice to anything that their characters are handed." Particular praise was given to Mitchell, D'Arcy, Cooke, Smith and Rankin. Alec Arens said of Mitchell that he "has been bringing his A-game to Aemond all season, but he particularly shines in this episode as Aemond steps into this new role, especially in the conversation he has with [Alicent]," while Carly Lane of Collider stated that "Mitchell is chillingly good at being indecipherable." Regarding D'Arcy, Arens called their performance "incredible", commending the way they "subtly and overtly portray Rhaenyra's restlessness bubbling toward the surface." Additionally, TVLine named Needham as an honorable mention as the "Performer of the Week" for the week of July 27, 2024, for his performance in the episode. The site wrote, "Sometimes, the most chilling threats are uttered in the calmest voices. Such was the case in [the episode], in which Matthew Needham deployed Larys' precise, quiet manner of speech to frightening effect at Aegon’s bedside. [...] Needham's immense skill allowed the one-sided interaction to twist in captivating fashion as the scene went on.

Several critics highlighted key moments from the episode, such as Seasmoke claiming Addam as his rider, Considine's return as King Viserys Targaryen in Daemon's visions, the smallfolk uprising, the royal drama in King's Landing and Aemond's conversations with Alicent, Larys and Aegon, as well as Rhaenyra and Mysaria's kiss. James Hunt described the kiss as "unexpected" but effective in adding more layers to both characters. Carly Lane and Proma Khosla of IndieWire praised the chemistry between D'Arcy and Mizuno, with Lane calling them "captivating to watch together," although she noted the lack of build up to their potential romance as a flaw. Other aspects lauded by critics included Parekh's direction, Djawadi's score, and Rhaenyra's character development. Katie Doll of CBR wrote about Parekh, opining that "Parekh made himself one of the best directors of the series by executing high-stakes and mundane scenarios with sensation." Meanwhile, the storyline in the Vale and lack of story development for Rhaena were criticized.

=== Audience response ===
The episode was the subject of review bombing on IMDb, which journalists attributed to homophobia over Rhaenyra and Mysaria's kiss. Aayush Sharma of Game Rant responded by saying, "The backlash against [the series] is appalling and can be disheartening for the people who worked on it." Screen Rant's James Hunt called the review bombing "ridiculous" and said that the series should have been praised for Rhaenyra and Mysaria's story.

=== Accolades ===
Year	Award	Category	Nominee	Result	Ref.
2025	Art Directors Guild Awards	Excellence in Production Design for a One-Hour Fantasy Single-Camera Series	Jim Clay	Pending	
