= Rialto (film) =

2019 drama film

- Film poster
- Directed by: Peter Mackie Burns
- Written by: Mark O'Halloran
- Produced by: Valentina Brazzini; Tristan Goligher; Alan Maher; Alan Maher
- Starring: Tom Vaughan-Lawlor; Tom Glynn-Carney
- Cinematography: Adam Scarth
- Edited by: Tim Fulford
- Music by: Valentin Hadjadj
- Production companies: Cowtown Pictures; The Bureau
- Release dates: 2 September 2019 (Venice); 2 October 2020 (Ireland)
- Running time: 90 minutes
- Countries: Ireland; United Kingdom
- Language: English

Rialto is a 2019 Irish-British drama film directed by Peter Mackie Burns and written by Mark O'Halloran. The film stars Tom Vaughan-Lawlor and Tom Glynn-Carney.

The film premiered at the 2019 Venice Film Festival in the Horizons section. It also played at the Goteborg Film Festival in 2020.

== Plot ==
Colm is a 46-year-old married man who has spent his life working on Dublin's docks. While he deals with the death of his father and the loss of his job due to a corporate take-over he explores his sexuality with 19-year-old male hustler Jay. Meanwhile, his family life comes under increasing strain.

== Cast ==
- Tom Vaughan-Lawlor as Colm
- Tom Glynn-Carney as Jay
- Monica Dolan as Claire
- Sophie Jo Wasson Kerry
- Scott Graham as Shane
- Michael Smiley as Noel
- Eileen Walsh as Paula Grainger
