= Bourne Wood =

Area of predominantly coniferous woodland just south of Farnham, Surrey, England

Coordinates: 51.191°N 0.778°W

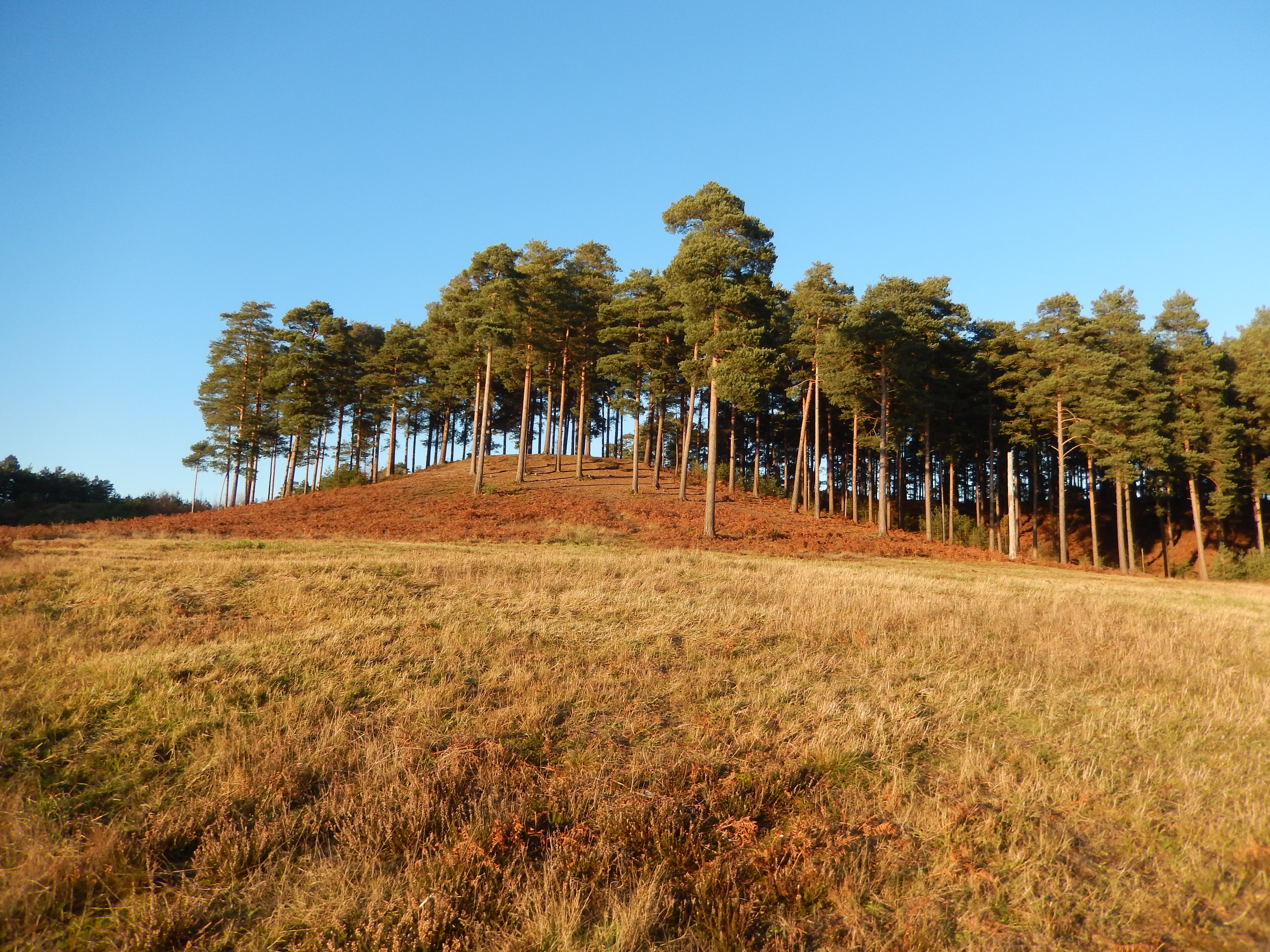
Conifers growing on a hill in the Bourne Wood

Bourne Wood (also known as Bourne Woods) is an area of predominantly coniferous woodland just south of Farnham, Surrey, England; the area is often used as a film location. Near to another area also used as a film location (Hankley Common in Elstead), locally it was known as The Clumps, and was called this until Forestry England changed the name in the 1950s when fire breaks were introduced. Charles Darwin may have written about the area in Appendices of Natural Selection, describing the trees in clumps. A promontory (rise) above a large heathland clearing (used for the filming of Gladiator) provides views over the surrounding woodland. Much of the wood was formerly heathland at the western end of the Greensand Ridge that was developed privately during the 20th century as commercial conifer plantations. This part of the wood has been purchased by the Royal Society for the Protection of Birds and is being restored mainly to heath, with retention of some woodland of wildlife significance, as Farnham Heath nature reserve. Their aim is to benefit scarce heathland species such as nightjar, woodlark, Dartford warbler and tree pipit as well as species such as sand lizard.

== Location for filming ==
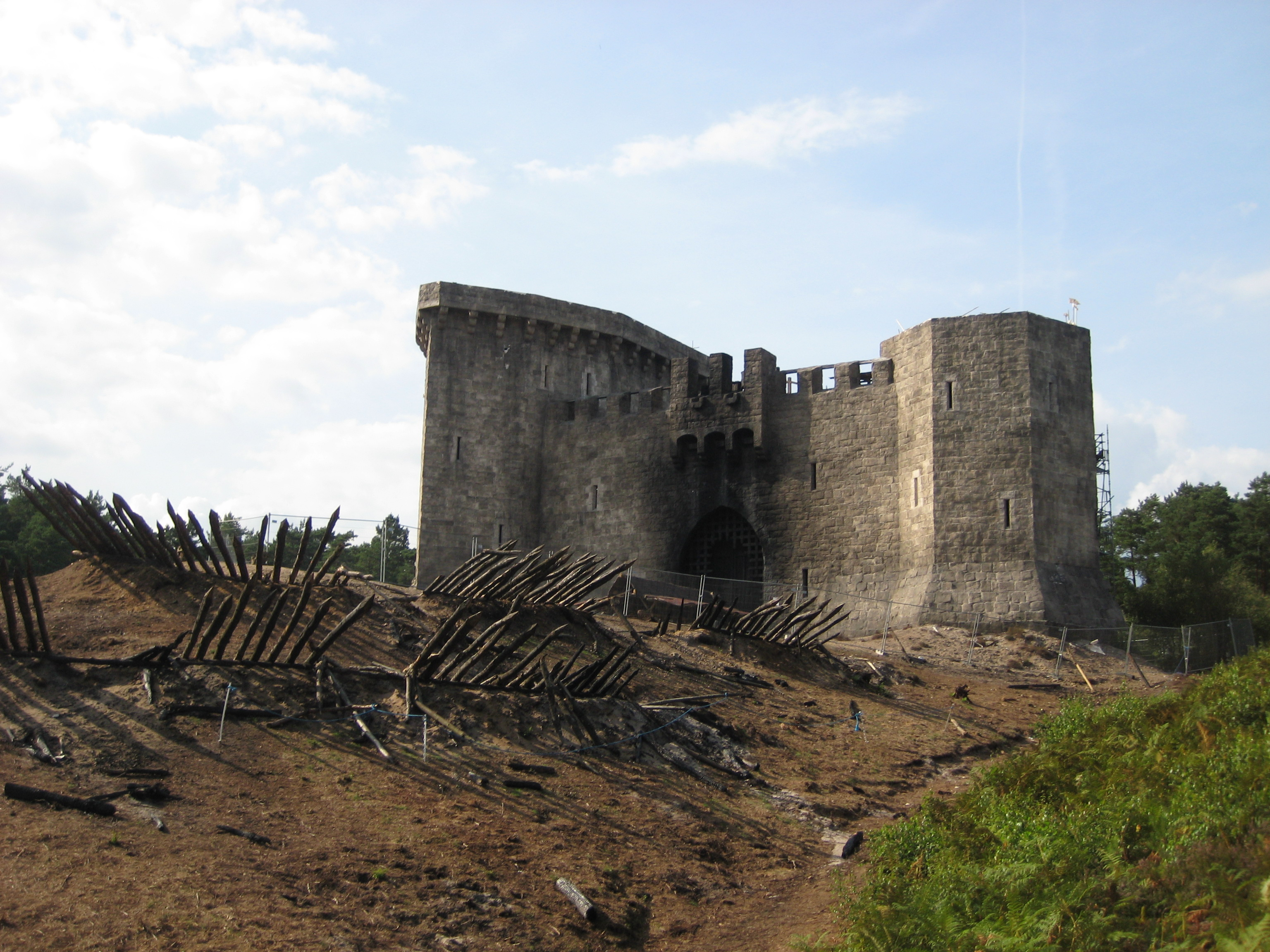
Mock castle at the Bourne Wood at the end of filming of the film Robin Hood, showing the burnt-out castle gate

Since 1999, part of Bourne Wood has been frequently used as a location for filming movies, television series and music videos, most notably the opening battle scenes of the film Gladiator which helped the location to gain popularity. The Game of Thrones prequel, House of the Dragon, was also filmed here for the battle at Rook's Rest. In addition, television adverts for products such as Marmite and IKEA have been filmed at the woods.

In September 2012, Forestry England announced plans to allow filming to take place in the Bourne Wood for up to eight months a year, noting that the site was a "nationally strategic film industry resource". In October 2013, Waverley Borough Council's planning committee granted permission for filming to be allowed at Bourne Wood for up to six months in one year or eight months over two years, with night filming for no more than seven days a year. Use of helicopters during filming will require additional permission from the council. Temporary structures may not exceed 25 m in height. The decision will be reviewed after five years.

In chronological order, the following productions have included scenes filmed in the Bourne Wood. All films are feature films unless otherwise stated.

Picture	Title	Release	Set construction and filming	Notes
	It Ain't Half Hot Mum	1974–1981		British sitcom. Jungle scenes were filmed at the Bourne Wood.
	Gladiator	2000	January–February 1999	The opening battle scenes in the forests of Germania were shot here.
	The Man Who Cried	2000		
	Band of Brothers	2001		Miniseries
	Storm	2001		Short film
	The Scientist	2002		Music video
	Gladiatress	2004		
	Foyle's War series 4: Bad Blood	2006	April–May 2005	Detective drama television series
	Children of Men	2006		
	The Golden Compass	2007		
	Inkheart	2008		
	We Call Her Daisy	2008		Short film
	The Descent Part 2	2009		
	Harry Potter And The Half-Blood Prince	2009		
	Burke & Hare	2010	March 2010	
Burnt-out castle gate and battering ram	Robin Hood	2010	May–August 2009	Setting for the siege of Chalus Castle at the start of the film.
	The Wolfman	2010		
	Harry Potter and the Deathly Hallows – Part 1	2010		
	Harry Potter and the Deathly Hallows – Part 2	2011		
	Captain America: The First Avenger	2011		
	War Horse	2011		
	Sherlock Holmes: A Game of Shadows	2011		
	Dark Shadows	2012	June–July 2011	
	Jack the Giant Slayer	2013	January–March 2011	
Burnt trees	Snow White and the Huntsman	2012	August–September 2011	Setting for the battle between King Magnus and an army of demonic glass soldiers near the beginning of the film.
Stone towers and yurts	Thor: The Dark World	2013	August–September 2012	Setting for the battle on Vanaheim near the beginning of the film.
	Avengers: Age of Ultron	2015	June–July 2014	The opening car chase scene was shot here, including parts of the assault on the Hydra base.
	Transformers: The Last Knight	2016	October 2016	Parts of the Merlin and Dragonstorm battle scene were shot here.
No photography sign at site of filming of Wonder Woman in the Bourne Wood	Wonder Woman	2017	August 2016	
	Jurassic World: Fallen Kingdom	2018		
Filming in the Bourne Wood	The Old Guard	2020	July–August 2019	
Film production fire engine on location at the Bourne Wood	The Witcher Season 2	2021	February and November 2020	
	Citadel	2023	March 2021	Episode 3
	Napoleon	2023	March 2022	The Battle of Auserlitz, with scenes shot here visible in the trailer from 2:08 to 2:24.
	Sonic the Hedgehog 3	2024	June 2023	
	House of the Dragon	2024	August 2023	Episode, The Red Dragon and the Gold. Location for the Battle at Rook's Rest.
	Renegade Nell	2024		Miniseries
	Citadel (TV Series) Season 2	2026	September-November 2024	Two sets, a supermarket and farmhouse
	Werwulf	2026	November 2025	Village set

== Wartime ==
During the Second World War a searchlight post was established in the woodland, the concrete base of which is marked and still visible today. Three structures were erected by Canadian soldiers in the northernmost section of the woods bordering Dene Lane, consisting of a mess hut and barracks for those manning the searchlight. Two of these buildings became separate dwellings owned by Forestry England providing accommodation for employees before becoming private houses.

== Other ==
Much of the wood was formerly heathland at the western end of the Greensand Ridge that was developed privately during the 20th century as commercial conifer plantations.

The headwaters of the Wey (west branch) converging on the town to the north are locally known also as The Bourne, which accordingly has helped to name Lower Bourne, a ward and neighbourhood of Farnham.

Two round tumuli are east and south-east of Forest Cottage in the wood. They are late Bronze Age, 21 m and 26 m in diameter and 1.7 m and 2 m high and one has suffered some disturbance in the centre and the south-eastern quadrant. Surrounding the mound is a ditch from which material was quarried during the construction of the monument. This is no longer visible at ground level, having become infilled over the years, and can be seen in a geophysical survey as a buried feature about 3 m wide.
