= The Red Sowing =

- House of the Dragon episode
- Episode no.: Season 2 Episode 7
- Directed by: Loni Peristere
- Written by: David Hancock
- Cinematography by: Vanja Cernjul
- Editing by: Katie Weiland
- Original air date: July 28, 2024
- Running time: 64 minutes

Guest appearance
- Paddy Considine as Viserys I Targaryen (uncredited)

Episode chronology
← Previous "Smallfolk"	Next → "The Queen Who Ever Was"
- House of the Dragon season 2

"The Red Sowing" is the seventh and penultimate episode of the second season of the fantasy drama television series House of the Dragon, a prequel to Game of Thrones. The title refers to the bloody fate of many Targaryen bastards, who are called "dragon seeds", trying to claim dragons. The episode was written by David Hancock and directed by Loni Peristere. It first aired on HBO and Max on July 28, 2024.

In the United States, the episode gained a viewership of 1.2 million during its premiere night on linear television alone. It received critical acclaim, with praise for the claiming of Vermithor and Silverwing, visual effects, cinematography, musical score, and cast performances (especially Emma D'Arcy, Olivia Cooke, Harry Collett, and Archie Barnes).

== Plot ==
On Driftmark, Rhaenyra confronts Addam of Hull, who is now Seasmoke's rider. Addam kneels and pledges his fealty to Rhaenyra. When asked about his parentage, Addam withholds telling her that Corlys Velaryon is his father to conceal his potential Valyrian bloodline. He follows Rhaenyra to Dragonstone on Seasmoke. At the Red Keep, Grand Maester Orwyle treats Alicent's superficial arm wound, received during the recent riot. Despondent after being removed from the Small Council, Alicent seeks solace in the Kingswood, taking one Kingsguard, Ser Rickard Thorne, for protection and assistance. They make camp, and, when asked, Alicent says she may not return to King's Landing. She spends time riding her horse in the woods and floating in a lake, reflecting on her current status.

In the courtyard, Larys observes as Aemond sentences two Kingsguards to lifetime servitude at the Wall, ostensibly for fomenting the riots. Lord Jasper Wylde approaches Larys and says that Seasmoke has a new, unknown rider. Considering it an unverified rumor, Larys suggests they withhold telling Aemond. Against Orwyle's advice, Larys pushes him to accelerate Aegon's recovery, despite the physical exertion causing Aegon extreme pain.

In the Vale, Rhaena escorts Rhaenyra's sons as they depart from the Eyrie to travel to Pentos, but she sneaks away from the group to track the wild dragon. At Harrenhal, Oscar Tully, the new Lord Paramount of the Trident, arrives with the Riverlords. He proclaims his intention to honor his late grandfather's oath of loyalty to Rhaenyra as Viserys' heir and offers Daemon his allegiance. The Riverlords doubt young Oscar's leadership ability and despise Daemon for allowing the Blackwoods' war atrocities against House Bracken. To appease the other lords, Oscar condemns Ser Willem Blackwood's savagery, though Willem claims he was doing Daemon's bidding. Oscar dismisses Willem's excuse and declares he must be held accountable. Oscar demands that Daemon prove himself worthy of the Riverlords' banners by showing contrition for his earlier actions and dispensing justice. Daemon agrees and executes Willem. Later, Daemon experiences another vision of Viserys, who says he never wanted the crown and that it crushes whoever wears it. He asks if Daemon still wants it.

Rhaenyra returns to Dragonstone with Addam and Seasmoke. Ignoring her council's concerns about a low-born dragonrider, she instructs that Addam be trained in dragonriding and tutored in High Valyrian. She is optimistic that other dragonriders can be found. Mysaria suggests that rather than researching noble houses for Targaryen descendants, to instead search King's Landing for dragonseeds with thicker blood ties. Rhaenyra concurs, but Jacaerys challenges her plan, arguing that bastard dragonriders could threaten Targaryen legitimacy and his own succession, revealing that he knows Ser Harwin Strong was his biological father. Rhaenyra says the dragonseed riders deserve respect. Corlys privately meets with Addam and, praising him, grants his request to be released from the position as his shipwright to become a dragonrider. Later, Corlys tasks Alyn with delivering a message to Elinda in King's Landing and procuring boats with reliable captains and crews. Corlys asks if Alyn would want to claim a dragon like his brother, but Alyn politely declines; saying he is "salt and sea".

In King's Landing, Elinda receives Mysaria's instructions on where to find Targaryen bastards, and word quickly spreads throughout the city. In a tavern, Ulf, who often boasted he has Targaryen ancestry, is urged to join the other dragonseeds heading to Dragonstone. Ulf is reluctant at first, claiming a leg injury, but he also harbors doubts regarding his real ancestry. Hugh, grieving his daughter's recent death and disillusioned with Aegon's reign, tells his wife Kat that his prostitute mother was a Targaryen and that he desires to go to Dragonstone and claim a dragon; saying it will better their lives. A few dozen dragonseeds, Ulf and Hugh among them, board boats organized by Alyn and set sail for Dragonstone.

As Rhaenyra greets the dragonseeds, the dragonkeepers denounce her decision to entrust smallfolk with dragons and leaves. Rhaenyra summons Vermithor, the largest living dragon after Vhagar, and steps aside to test the dragonseeds. A dragonseed named Silver Denys steps forth to try and claim Vermithor, but the dragon immediately rejects him and burns him to death before unleashing a furious attack; killing dozens more in a fiery rampage. Hugh, having avoided dragonfire, confronts Vermithor; stopping him from killing a woman dragonseed and offering his life. Impressed by Hugh's boldness, Vermithor accepts him as his new rider. Meanwhile, Ulf also manages to avoid Vermithor's attack; escaping into caverns adjacent, and stumbles into the lair of the dragon Silverwing. Terrified, Ulf surrenders to the dragon and she responds by quickly accepting him as her new rider; confirming his Targaryen lineage.

During a council meeting, Lord Jasper informs Aemond that Prince Daeron Targaryen and his dragon Tessarion are nearly ready to join the war. The meeting is interrupted by a loud commotion outside—Ulf flying on Silverwing above the city. Aemond rushes out to mount Vhagar and pursues them to Dragonstone. However, he quickly retreats upon seeing Rhaenyra with Syrax, Vermithor, and Silverwing, all adult dragons now claimed by riders.

== Production ==
=== Writing and filming ===
"The Red Sowing" was written by David Hancock and directed by executive producer Loni Peristere. It marks Hancock's second time as writer for the series, following "The Burning Mill", and Peristere's first directorial credit. The title of the episode refers to the event called the Red Sowing during which several lowborn Targaryen bastards (called "dragonseeds") claimed dragons and joined the Blacks.

Speaking of his character Ulf White and scenes in the episode, actor Tom Bennett said, as noted by James Hibberd in The Hollywood Reporter, "He's thinking, 'A lot of these people look more Targaryen than I am.' ... My name is Ulf White but it's more salt-and-pepper gray. And panic sets in. There comes a moment where you’ve been spreading this lie for the sake of a free pint of Guinness and now you have to show up and there’s a fucking big dragon there."

=== Casting ===
The episode stars Matt Smith as Prince Daemon Targaryen, Emma D'Arcy as Queen Rhaenyra Targaryen, Olivia Cooke as Queen Dowager Alicent Hightower, Steve Toussaint as Lord Corlys Velaryon, Sonoya Mizuno as Mysaria, Matthew Needham as Lord Larys "Clubfoot" Strong, Tom Glynn-Carney as King Aegon II Targaryen, Ewan Mitchell as Prince Aemond Targaryen, Harry Collett as Prince Jacaerys Velaryon, Bethany Antonia as Lady Baela Targaryen, Phoebe Campbell as Lady Rhaena Targaryen, Kurt Egyiawan as Grand Maester Orwyle, Abubakar Salim as Alyn of Hull, Clinton Liberty as Addam of Hull, Kieran Bew as Hugh Hammer, Ellora Torchia as Kat, Tom Bennett as Ulf White, and Simon Russell Beale as Ser Simon Strong.

Paddy Considine once again made an uncredited guest appearance as King Viserys Targaryen, following the previous episode. The episode marks the final appearance of recurring character Willem Blackwood (Jack Parry-Jones).

== Release ==
"The Red Sowing" was screened early at San Diego Comic-Con for attendees on July 26, 2024. It was released on HBO and Max on July 28, 2024.

== Reception ==
=== Ratings ===
In the United States, "The Red Sowing" was watched by an estimated 1.2 million viewers during its first broadcast on HBO alone on July 28, 2024. This was a 5.9% decrease from the previous episode.

=== Critical response ===
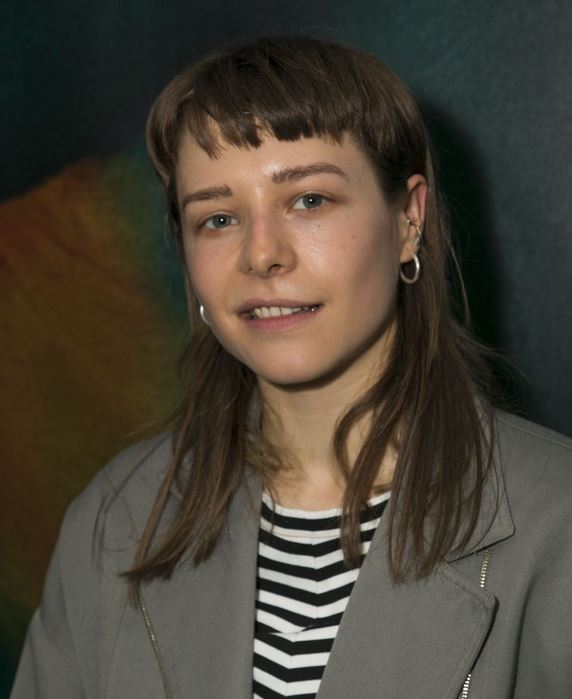
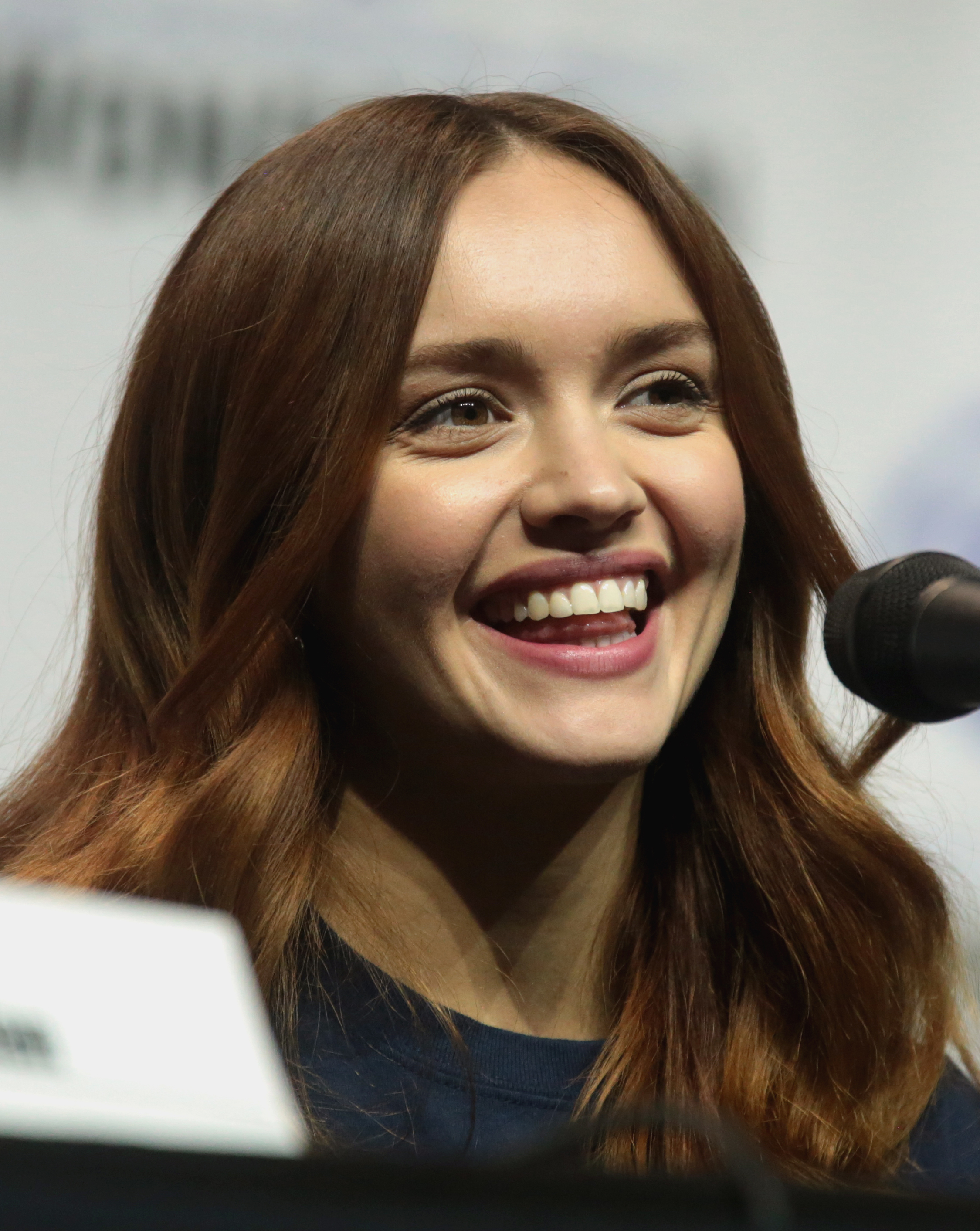
The performances of Emma D'Arcy, Olivia Cooke, and Harry Collett received praise from critics.

"The Red Sowing" was met with acclaim from critics. On the review aggregator Rotten Tomatoes, it holds an approval rating of 96% based on 23 reviews, with an average rating of 8.2/10. The site's critical consensus says, "A new generation of dragon riders takes shape in 'The Red Showing', a fast-paced installment that climaxes with a fiery payoff to the season's careful world-building."

Helen O'Hara of IGN awarded the episode with an "amazing" score of 9 out of 10, praising it as "an episode with momentum, drama, and consequence [that] sets all the pieces in place for a grand finale." Katie Doll of CBR and Carly Lane of Collider both scored it 8 out of 10, with the former describing it as "a fantastic piece of television". Doll also highlighted Larys' character development and the characterization of Oscar Tully as the episode's standout elements. Moreover, Kayleigh Dray of The A.V. Club graded it with an "A", while Proma Khosla of IndieWire gave it a "B", commending Djawadi's score, Cernjul's cinematography, and the visual effects. Similarly, Santanu Das of Hindustan Times echoed Khosla's sentiment, praising the score and cinematography.

The episode also received a rating of 4 out of 5 stars from David Crow of Den of Geek, James Hunt of Screen Rant, Haley Whitmire White of TV Fanatic, and Jonathan Wilson of Ready Steady Cut. Hunt considered it "one of the strongest installments of the season, and offers a sense of momentum heading into the end of the season" and praised the payoff of Daemon's story with the Riverlords, while Wilson summarized his review by saying, "A very solid penultimate episode lays the groundwork for an explosive finale." Writing for GamesRadar+, Molly Edwards rated the episode 3.5 out of 5 stars and wrote in her verdict: "Not quite as explosive as a traditional penultimate episode, but [it] certainly brings the fire and blood with its brutal dragon action – and sets the board for what should be an epic finale."

The performances of the cast received critical praise, particularly those of D'Arcy, Cooke, Collett, and Archie Barnes. Both James Hunt and Kayleigh Dray called D'Arcy's performance "brilliant", with Hunt also noting, "A lot of praise must also go to Collett, who gives his best performance yet as Jace." Molly Edwards said of Cooke that she was "excellent at subtly portraying Alicent's deeply buried distress." TVLine named Barnes as an honorable mention as the "Performer of the Week" for the week of August 3, 2024, for his performance in the episode, calling him a "scene-stealer" and stating that "Barnes imbued his character with both genuine modesty and surprising aplomb, every line reading more deliciously authoritative than the last."

The storyline involving the claiming of Vermithor and Silverwing, as well as their scenes with Ulf and Hugh, received significant praise, with Carly Lane calling it "some of the best scenes in the entire series to date." Additionally, the final shot was also a subject of praise from several critics.
