= Tom Glynn-Carney =

English actor (born 1995)

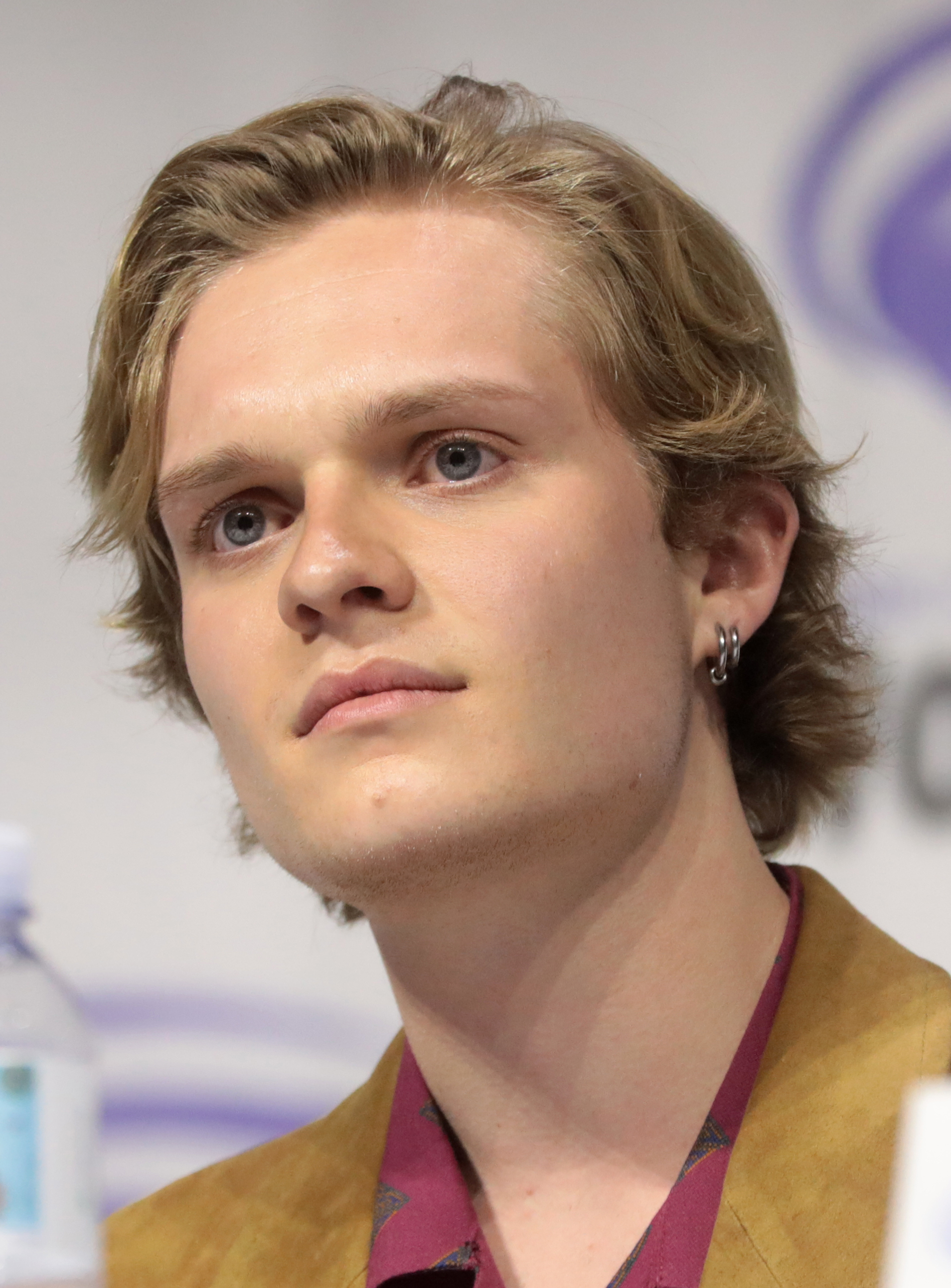
- Glynn-Carney in 2019
- Born: Tom Glynn-Whitehead; 7 February 1995 (age 31); Salford, Greater Manchester, England
- Education: Guildhall School of Music and Drama (BA)
- Occupation: Actor
- Years active: 2013–present

Tom Glynn-Carney (born 7 February 1995) is an English actor. He appeared in Christopher Nolan's war film Dunkirk (2017) and won a Drama Desk Award in 2019 for his performance in the play The Ferryman. He gained recognition for starring as Aegon II Targaryen in the fantasy drama series House of the Dragon (2022–present).

== Early life ==
Glynn-Carney was born on 7 February 1995 in Salford, Greater Manchester, England. He studied at Canon Slade School in Bolton, and went on to study Musical Theatre in Pendleton Sixth Form College, receiving a triple distinction star in performing arts, the highest possible grade for a vocational qualification. He then attended the Guildhall School of Music and Drama, where he studied acting. While studying, he participated in professional stage adaptations of Peter Pan and Macbeth.

== Career ==
Glynn-Carney's first experience on television was in 2013 when he had a role in two episodes of Casualty. He secured a lead role in the BBC military drama The Last Post, launched as part of the new season Autumn 2017 content on BBC1. He plays Lance Corporal Tony Armstrong. From April 2017, he starred as Shane Corcoran in the Jez Butterworth play The Ferryman, which opened at the Royal Court Theatre. He later transferred with the production to the west end at the Gielgud Theatre, leaving the production in October 2017. Glynn-Carney won the Emerging Talent Award at the Evening Standard Theatre Awards for his performance.

Glynn-Carney's first introduction to American audiences was in the war drama Dunkirk, directed by Christopher Nolan and released in July 2017. He plays Peter, the son of the small boat captain who sailed to rescue British soldiers from the surrounded city Dunkirk. In 2018 Glynn-Carney was named as one of Screen International's Stars of Tomorrow, along with Naomi Ackie, Jessie Buckley, and Connor Swindells amongst others.

In 2019 he starred as Henry "Hotspur" Percy in the David Michôd directed film The King in a cast which included Robert Pattinson, Sean Harris, Timothée Chalamet and Lily-Rose Depp.

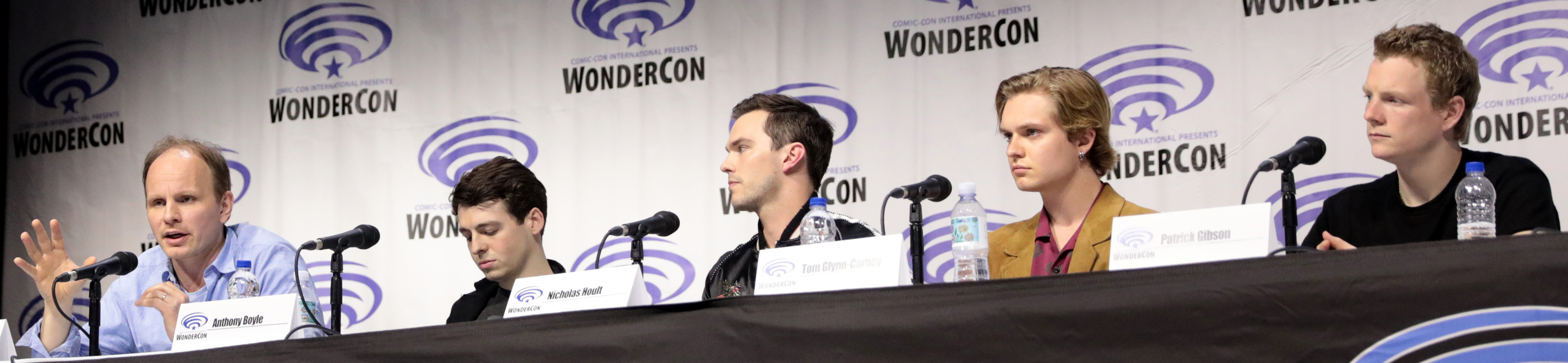
The cast of Tolkien at WonderCon 2019 in Anaheim, California. From left to right: director Dome Karukoski, Anthony Boyle, Nicholas Hoult, Tom Glynn-Carney, and Patrick Gibson.

Tom Glynn-Carney portrayed Christopher Wiseman, one of J. R. R. Tolkien’s close friends, in the 2019 biographical film Tolkien, alongside Nicholas Hoult and Lily Collins. The film depicts the life of the English professor, philologist, and author of The Hobbit, The Lord of the Rings, and The Silmarillion.

In March 2022, Glynn-Carney joined the cast of House of the Dragon, where he plays King Aegon II Targaryen, first born son of King Viserys Targaryen, played by Paddy Considine, and Alicent Hightower, played by Olivia Cooke. He appeared in the BBC miniseries SAS: Rogue Heroes, released in October 2022. In 2023, he appeared in The Book of Clarence. The following year, he starred in the crime drama The Jetty.

Glynn-Carney is also the lead singer of the indie band, Sleep Walking Animals.

== Acting credits ==
=== Film ===
Year	Title	Role	Notes
2017	Dunkirk	Peter Dawson	
2019	Tolkien	Christopher Wiseman	
2019	The King	Henry "Hotspur" Percy	
2019	Rialto	Jay	
2023	The Book of Clarence	Decimus	

=== Television ===
Year	Title	Role	Notes
2013	Casualty	George Thorne	2 episodes
2017	The Last Post	Anthony "Tony" Armstrong	Main role
2018	Doing Money	Sean	Television film
2021	Domina	Young Gaius	2 episodes
2022	SAS: Rogue Heroes	Michael "Mike" Sadler	
2022	Mayflies	Young Tully	Two-part drama
2022–present	House of the Dragon	Aegon II Targaryen	Main role; 17 episodes
2024	The Jetty	Malachy Granger	Miniseries

=== Theatre ===
Year	Production	Role	Theatre
2017	The Ferryman	Shane Corcoran	Royal Court Theatre
2017	The Ferryman	Shane Corcoran	Gielgud Theatre
2018	The Ferryman	Shane Corcoran	Bernard B. Jacobs Theatre
2022	The Glass Menagerie	Tom Wingfield	Duke of York's Theatre
2025–2026	All My Sons	George Deever	Wyndham's Theatre
2026	The Oresteia	Augie	Bridge Theatre

== Awards and nominations ==
Year	Awards	Category	Work	Result	Ref.
2017	Evening Standard Theatre Awards	Emerging Talent Award	The Ferryman	Won	
2018	Screen International	Stars of Tomorrow		Won	
2019	Drama Desk Award	Outstanding Featured Actor in a Play	The Ferryman	Won	
