= Ewan Mitchell =

English actor (born 1997)

- Born: Ewan Robert Mitchell; 8 March 1997 (age 29); Derby, England
- Occupation: Actor
- Years active: 2015–present

Ewan Robert Mitchell (born 8 March 1997) is an English actor. He is best known for his roles as Osferth in the medieval series The Last Kingdom (2017–2022), Tom Bennett in the BBC war drama World on Fire (2019–2023), and Prince Aemond Targaryen in the HBO fantasy series House of the Dragon (2022–present). Mitchell has also appeared in the films High Life (2018), Saltburn (2023) and Wuthering Heights (2026).

== Personal life ==
Mitchell has stated he grew up in the suburbs of Derby. As his family could not afford drama school fees, Mitchell enrolled at a two-year vocational school before being accepted at 17 to train at the Central Junior Television Workshop in Nottingham.

== Career ==
Mitchell began his acting career in 2015, upon graduating high school, appearing in the short films Stereotype (2015), Fire (2015) and Wedged (2015). He later had a minor role in the film Just Charlie (2017), and appeared in a supporting role in High Life (2018), also starring Robert Pattinson. In 2023, Mitchell portrayed the character Michael Gavey in the Amazon Prime original film Saltburn alongside Barry Keoghan and Jacob Elordi.

On television, Mitchell made his debut in the 2017 ITV period drama The Halcyon as Billy Taylor. His breakout role was in the BBC Two and Netflix historical drama The Last Kingdom as Osferth, a role he played from the second to fifth series. In 2019, he starred as Tom Bennett in the BBC One World War II drama series World on Fire.

In 2022, Mitchell appeared in the ITV crime thriller Trigger Point as Billy Washington. Later that year, Mitchell starred in HBO's prequel to Game of Thrones, House of the Dragon, adapted from George R. R. Martin's book Fire and Blood. He took on the role of Prince Aemond Targaryen, a fierce, hot-tempered and dangerous swordsman, the second son and third child of King Viserys I and Queen Alicent Hightower. He has received recognition as one of the best castings of the show, his portrayal quickly establishing the character as one of the most compelling.

== Filmography ==
Key
†	Denotes films that have not yet been released

=== Film ===
Year	Title	Role	Notes	Ref
2015	Stereotype	Scott Bamford	Short film	
2015	Fire	Jack	Short film	
2015	Wedged	Joe	Short film	
2017	Just Charlie	Jason		
2018	High Life	Ettore		
2019	Stalker	Poacher	Short film	
2023	Saltburn	Michael Gavey		
2026	Wuthering Heights	Joseph		
2026	Still Life	Leo	Short film	
TBA	A Colt Is My Passport †		Post-production	
TBA	Fonda †		Post-production	
TBA	The Healer †	Dandy Lynch	Post-production	
TBA	The Way of the Runner †		Post-production	
TBA	To Make Ends Meat †		Post-production	
TBA	The Inbetweeners 3 †	Vicar	Post-production	

=== Television ===
Year	Title	Role	Network	Notes	Ref
2017	The Halcyon	Billy Taylor	ITV	Main role	
2017	Grantchester	Abraham	ITV	1 episode	
2017	Doctors	Genyen	BBC One	1 episode ("Free Lunch")	
2017–2022	The Last Kingdom	Osferth	BBC Two/Netflix	Main role (series 2–5); 28 episodes	
2019–2023	World on Fire	Tom Bennett	BBC One	Main role; 6 episodes	
2022	Trigger Point	Billy Washington	ITV/Peacock	3 episodes	
2022–present	House of the Dragon	Aemond Targaryen	HBO	Main role; 17 episodes	

=== Music videos ===
Year	Title	Artist(s)	Role	Ref
2024	"In the Modern World"	Fontaines D.C.	Martin Lefevre	
2025	"It's Amazing To Be Young"	Fontaines D.C.	Martin Lefevre	
2026	"Silhouette on the Hill"	Paris Paloma	The Dead Man	

== Awards and nominations ==
Year	Award	Category	Work	Result	Ref.
2026	Critics' Choice Super Awards	Best Villain in a Series, Limited Series or Made-for-TV Movie	House Of The Dragon	Nominated	
2026	City Lights Film Festival	Best Actor	Still Life	Won	
