= American Society of Cinematographers Award for Outstanding Achievement in Cinematography in Regular Series =

Annual US television award

The following is a list of those who have won the American Society of Cinematographers Award for Outstanding Achievement in Cinematography in Regular Series. The award is given by the American Society of Cinematographers to a regular television series while television movies, miniseries and pilots compete in their own category.

== Winners and nominees ==
=== 1990s ===
Year	Program	Episode	Nominees	Network
1993
1993	Dr. Quinn, Medicine Woman	"Where the Heart Is"	Roland 'Ozzie' Smith	CBS
1993	NYPD Blue	"Oscar, Meyer, Weiner"	Brian J. Reynolds	ABC
1993	NYPD Blue	"True Confessions"	Bing Sokolsky	ABC
1993	Second Chances	"I Can't Get No Satisfaction"	Lowell Peterson	CBS
1993	The Young Indiana Jones Chronicles	"Istanbul, September 1918"	David Tattersall	ABC
1994
1994	ER	"Day One"	Thomas Del Ruth	NBC
1994	Dr. Quinn, Medicine Woman	"The Washington Affair"	Roland 'Ozzie' Smith	CBS
1994	NYPD Blue	"You Bet Your Life"	Brian J. Reynolds	ABC
1994	Star Trek: Deep Space Nine	"Crossover"	Marvin V. Rush	Syndicated
1994	The X-Files	"Duane Barry"	John Bartley	Fox
1995
1995	Murder One	"Chapter Four"	Aaron Schneider	ABC
1995	Chicago Hope	"Leave of Absence"	Kenneth Zunder	CBS
1995	NYPD Blue	"Heavin' Can Wait"	Brian J. Reynolds	ABC
1995	Tales from the Crypt	"You, Murderer"	Rick Bota	HBO
1995	The X-Files	"Grotesque"	John Bartley	Fox
1996
1996	Murder One	"Chapter Nine"	Aaron Schneider	ABC
1996	Chicago Hope	"A Time to Kill"	James R. Bagdonas	CBS
1996	High Incident	"The Godfather"	Bing Sokolsky	ABC
1996	NYPD Blue	"Closing Time"	Brian J. Reynolds	ABC
1996	The X-Files	"Grotesque"	John Bartley	Fox
1997
1997	3rd Rock from the Sun	"A Nightmare on Dick Street"	Marc Reshovsky	NBC
1997	Ally McBeal	"Silver Bells"	Billy Dickson	Fox
1997	Chicago Hope	"Hope Against Hope"	James R. Bagdonas	CBS
1997	Millennium	"The Thin White Line"	Robert McLachlan	Fox
1997	Prince Street	"God Bless America"	Jonathan Freeman	NBC
1998
1998	The X-Files	"Drive"	Bill Roe	Fox
1998	JAG	"Gypsy Eyes"	Hugo Cortina	CBS
1998	Michael Hayes	"Imagine, Part 2" / "Under Color of Law"	James L. Carter	CBS
1998	Millennium	"Skull and Bones"	Robert McLachlan	Fox
1998	The X-Files	"Travelers"	Joel Ransom	Fox
1999
1999	The X-Files	"Agua Mala"	Bill Roe	Fox
1999	Felicity	"Todd Mulcahy, Part 2"	Robert Primes	The WB
1999	Millennium	"Matryoshka"	Robert McLachlan	Fox
1999	Profiler	"Las Brisas"	Lowell Peterson	NBC
1999	Time of Your Life	"The Time the Millennium Approached"	John Peters	Fox

=== 2000s ===
Year	Program	Episode	Nominees	Network
2000
2000	The West Wing	"Noël"	Thomas Del Ruth	NBC
2000	Ally McBeal	"Ally McBeal: The Musical, Almost"	Billy Dickson	Fox
2000	The Others	"1112"	Shelly Johnson	NBC
2000	The Practice	"The Deal"	Dennis Smith	ABC
2000	Touched by an Angel	"God Bless the Child"	Frank E. Johnson	CBS
2000	The X-Files	"Patience"	Bill Roe	Fox
2001
2001	The West Wing	"Bartlet for America"	Thomas Del Ruth	NBC
2001	Alias	"Time Will Tell"	Michael Bonvillain	ABC
2001	Ally McBeal	"The Wedding"	Billy Dickson	Fox
2001	CSI: Crime Scene Investigation	"Alter Boys”"	Michael Barrett	CBS
2001	The X-Files	"This is Not Happening"	Bill Roe	Fox
2002
2002	MDs	"Wing and a Prayer"	Robert Primes	ABC
2002	Alias	"Page 47"	Michael Bonvillain	ABC
2002	Ally McBeal	"Reality Bites"	Billy Dickson	Fox
2002	CSI: Crime Scene Investigation	"Fight Night"	Frank Byers	CBS
2002	CSI: Crime Scene Investigation	"Snuff"	Michael Barrett	CBS
2002	The West Wing	"Holy Night"	Thomas Del Ruth	NBC
2002	The X-Files	"Release"	Bill Roe	Fox
2003
2003	Carnivàle	"Pick a Number"	Jeffrey Jur	HBO
2003	Cold Case	"Time to Hate"	Eric Schmidt	CBS
2003	Crossing Jordan	"Dead Wives Club"	John Aronson	NBC
2003	Threat Matrix	"Dr. Germ"	Chris Manley	ABC
2003	The West Wing	"7A WF 83429"	Thomas Del Ruth	NBC
2004
2004	CSI: Crime Scene Investigation	"Down the Drain"	Nathan Hope	CBS
2004	CSI: NY	"A Man a Mile"	Chris Manley	CBS
2004	Deadwood	"Deep Water"	David Boyd	HBO
2004	The Sopranos	"Long Term Parking"	Alik Sakharov	HBO
2004	The West Wing	"Gaza"	Thomas Del Ruth	NBC
2005
2005	CSI: Crime Scene Investigation	"Who Shot Sherlock?"	Nathan Hope	CBS
2005	Carnivàle	"Los Moscos"	Jeffrey Jur	HBO
2005	Las Vegas	"Everything Old Is You Again"	John C. Newby	NBC
2005	Smallville	"Scared"	Glen Winter	The WB
2005	Without a Trace	"Freefall"	John B. Aronson	CBS
2006
2006	Smallville	"Arrow"	David Moxness	The CW
2006	CSI: Crime Scene Investigation	"Killer"	Nathan Hope	CBS
2006	CSI: Miami	"Darkroom"	Eagle Egilsson	CBS
2006	Day Break	"What If They Find Him"	Bill Roe	ABC
2006	House	"Meaning"	Gale Tattersall	Fox
2007
2007	Smallville	"Noir"	Glen Winter	The CW
2007	The Black Donnellys	"All of Us Are in the Gutter"	Russell Lee Fine	NBC
2007	CSI: Crime Scene Investigation	"Happy Ending"	James L. Carter	CBS
2007	CSI: Miami	"Inside Out"	Eagle Egilsson	CBS
2007	Women's Murder Club	"Welcome to the Club"	John Fleckenstein	ABC
2008
2008	CSI: Crime Scene Investigation	"For Gedda"	Nelson Cragg	CBS
2008	Flashpoint	"Who's George?"	Stephen Reizes	CBS
2008	House	"House's Head"	Gale Tattersall	Fox
2008	Smallville	"Fracture"	Glen Winter	The CW
2008	The Tudors	"Everything Is Beautiful"	Ousama Rawi	Showtime
2009
2009	Dark Blue	"Venice Kings"	Eagle Egilsson	TNT
2009	CSI: Crime Scene Investigation	"Family Affair"	Christian Sebaldt	CBS
2009	FlashForward	"The Gift"	Jeffrey Jur	ABC
2009	Smallville	"Savior"	Glen Winter	The CW
2009	Ugly Betty	"There's No Place Like Mode"	Michael Price	ABC

=== 2010s ===
Year	Program	Episode	Nominees	Network
2010
2010	Boardwalk Empire	"Home"	Jonathan Freeman	HBO
2010	Boardwalk Empire	"Family Limitation"	Kramer Morgenthau	HBO
2010	Dark Blue	"Shell Game"	Eagle Egilsson	TNT
2010	Mad Men	"Blowing Smoke"	Christopher Manley	AMC
2010	Nikita	"Pilot"	David Stockton	The CW
2010	Smallville	"Abandoned"	Glen Winter	The CW
2010	Smallville	"Shield"	Michael Wale	The CW
2011; Half-Hour
2011; Half-Hour	Californication	"Suicide Solution"	Michael Weaver	Showtime
2011; Half-Hour	Bored to Death	"Forget the Herring"	Vanja Cernjul	HBO
2011; Half-Hour	The Haunting Hour	"Brush with Madness"	Michael Balfry	Hub
2011; Half-Hour	Man Up!	"Acceptance"	Levie Isaacks	ABC
2011; Half-Hour	Modern Family	"Bixby's Back"	James Bagdonas	ABC
2011; One-Hour
2011; One-Hour	Boardwalk Empire	"21"	Jonathan Freeman	HBO
2011; One-Hour	Boardwalk Empire	"To the Lost"	David Franco	HBO
2011; One-Hour	Chase	"Narco, Part 2"	David Stockton	NBC
2011; One-Hour	Downton Abbey	"Pilot"	David Katznelson	PBS
2011; One-Hour	Pan Am	"Pilot"	John Lindley	ABC
2012; Half-Hour
2012; Half-Hour	Wilfred	"Truth"	Bradford Lipson	FX
2012; Half-Hour	Ben and Kate	"Guitar Face"	Ken Glassing	Fox
2012; Half-Hour	Happy Endings	"Four Weddings and a Funeral (Minus Three Weddings and One Funeral)"	Michael Price	ABC
2012; Half-Hour	House of Lies	"Gods of Dangerous Financial Instruments"	Peter Levy	Showtime
2012; Half-Hour	The New Normal	"Pilot"	Michael Goi	NBC
2012; One-Hour
2012; One-Hour	Game of Thrones	"The North Remembers"	Kramer Morgenthau	HBO
2012; One-Hour	Hunted	"Mort"	Balazs Bolygo	Cinemax
2012; One-Hour	Alcatraz	"Pilot"	David Stockton	Fox
2012; One-Hour	Fringe	"Letters of Transit"	David Moxness	Fox
2012; One-Hour	Mad Men	"The Phantom"	Christopher Manley	AMC
2012; One-Hour	Strike Back	"Episode 11"	Michael Spragg	Cinemax
2013; Half-Hour
2013; Half-Hour	Drunk History	"Detroit"	Blake McClure	Comedy Central
2013; Half-Hour	Alpha House	"Pilot"	Matthew J. Lloyd	Amazon Prime Video
2013; Half-Hour	House of Lies	"The Runner Stumbles"	Peter Levy	Showtime
2013; One-Hour
2013; One-Hour	Game of Thrones	"Valar Dohaeris"	Jonathan Freeman	HBO
2013; One-Hour	Beauty & the Beast	"Tough Love"	David Greene	The CW
2013; One-Hour	Boardwalk Empire	"Erlkönig"	David Franco	HBO
2013; One-Hour	The Borgias	"The Purge"	Pierre Gill	Showtime
2013; One-Hour	Dracula	"The Blood Is the Life"	Ousama Rawi	NBC
2013; One-Hour	Game of Thrones	"Kissed by Fire"	Anette Haellmigk	HBO
2013; One-Hour	Magic City	"The Sins of the Father"	Steven Bernstein	Starz
2013; One-Hour	Sleepy Hollow	"Pilot"	Kramer Morgenthau	Fox
2014
2014	Boardwalk Empire	"Golden Days for Boys and Girls"	Jonathan Freeman	HBO
2014	Game of Thrones	"The Children"	Anette Haellmigk	HBO
2014	Game of Thrones	"Mockingbird"	Fabian Wagner	HBO
2014	Gotham	"Spirit of the Goat"	Christopher Norr	Fox
2014	Manhattan	"Perestroika"	Richard Rutkowski	WGN America
2014	Vikings	"Blood Eagle"	PJ Dillon	History
2015
2015	Marco Polo	"The Fourth Step"	Vanja Černjul	Netflix
2015	Game of Thrones	"Hardhome"	Fabian Wagner	HBO
2015	Gotham	"Rise of the Villains: Scarification"	Crescenzo Notarile	Fox
2015	Gotham	"Rise of the Villains: Strike Force"	Christopher Norr	Fox
2015	12 Monkeys	"Mentally Divergent"	David Greene	Syfy
2016; Commercial Television
2016; Commercial Television	Mr. Robot	"eps2.0_unm4sk-pt1.tc"	Tod Campbell	USA
2016; Commercial Television	Gotham	"Wrath of the Villains: Mr. Freeze"	Christopher Norr	Fox
2016; Commercial Television	Manhattan	"Jupiter"	Richard Rutkowski	WGN America
2016; Commercial Television	Preacher	"Finish the Song"	John Grillo	AMC
2016; Commercial Television	Underground	"The Macon 7"	Kevin McKnight	WGN America
2016; Non-Commercial Television
2016; Non-Commercial Television	Game of Thrones	"Battle of the Bastards"	Fabian Wagner	HBO
2016; Non-Commercial Television	Game of Thrones	"Book of the Stranger"	Anette Haellmigk	HBO
2016; Non-Commercial Television	House of Cards	"Chapter 45"	David M. Dunlap	Netflix
2016; Non-Commercial Television	Outlander	"Prestonpans"	Neville Kidd	Starz
2016; Non-Commercial Television	Penny Dreadful	"The Day Tennyson Died"	John Conroy	Showtime
2017; Commercial Television
2017; Commercial Television	12 Monkeys	"Thief"	Boris Mojsovski	Syfy
2017; Commercial Television	Gotham	"The Executioner"	Crescenzo Notarile	Fox
2017; Commercial Television	Legion	"Chapter 1"	Dana Gonzales	FX
2017; Commercial Television	The Originals	"Bag of Cobras"	Kurt Jones	The CW
2017; Commercial Television	12 Monkeys	"Mother"	David Greene	Syfy
2017; Non-Commercial Television
2017; Non-Commercial Television	The Crown	"Smoke and Mirrors"	Adriano Goldman	Netflix
2017; Non-Commercial Television	Game of Thrones	"Dragonstone"	Gregory Middleton	HBO
2017; Non-Commercial Television	Game of Thrones	"The Spoils of War"	Robert McLachlan	HBO
2017; Non-Commercial Television	The Man in the High Castle	"Land O' Smiles"	Gonzalo Amat	Amazon Prime Video
2017; Non-Commercial Television	Outlander	"The Battle Joined"	Alasdair Walker	Starz
2019; Commercial Television
2019; Commercial Television	Beyond	"Two Zero One"	Jon Joffin	Freeform
2019; Commercial Television	Timeless	"The King of the Delta Blues"	Nathaniel Goodman	NBC
2019; Commercial Television	Yellowstone	"Daybreak"	Ben Richardson	Paramount Network
2019; Commercial Television	Gotham	"A Dark Knight: Queen Takes Knight"	David Stockton	Fox
2019; Commercial Television	Damnation	"A Different Species"	Thomas Yatsko	USA Network
2019; Non-Commercial Television
2019; Non-Commercial Television	The Crown	"Beryl"	Adriano Goldman	Netflix
2019; Non-Commercial Television	The Man in the High Castle	"Jahr Null"	Gonzalo Amat	Amazon Prime Video
2019; Non-Commercial Television	Homeland	"Paean to the People"	David Klein	Showtime
2019; Non-Commercial Television	The Handmaid's Tale	"The Word"	Colin Watkinson	Hulu
2019; Non-Commercial Television	Peaky Blinders	"The Company"	Cathal Watters	Netflix
2019; Non-Commercial Television	The Handmaid's Tale	"Holly"	Zoë White	Hulu

=== 2020s ===
Year	Program	Episode	Nominees	Network
2020; Commercial Television
2020; Commercial Television	Project Blue Book	"The Flatwoods Monster"	C. Kim Miles	History
2020; Commercial Television	Legion	"Chapter 20"	Dana Gonzales	FX
2020; Commercial Television	Legion	"Chapter 23"	Polly Morgan	FX
2020; Commercial Television	Vikings	"Hell"	Peter Robertson	History
2020; Commercial Television	Gotham	"Ace Chemicals"	David Stockton	Fox
2020; Non-Commercial Television
2020; Non-Commercial Television	The Handmaid's Tale	"Night"	Colin Watkinson	Hulu
2020; Non-Commercial Television	Das Boot	"Gegen die Zeit"	David Luther	Sky One
2020; Non-Commercial Television	The Marvelous Mrs. Maisel	"Simone"	M. David Mullen	Amazon Prime Video
2020; Non-Commercial Television	Carnival Row	"Grieve No More"	Chris Seager	Amazon Prime Video
2020; Non-Commercial Television	Titans	"Dick Grayson"	Brendan Steacy	DC Universe
2021; Commercial Television
2021; Commercial Television	Motherland: Fort Salem	"Up is Down"	Jon Joffin	Freeform
2021; Commercial Television	Better Call Saul	"Bagman"	Marshall Adams	AMC
2021; Commercial Television	Killing Eve	"Meetings Have Biscuits"	Carlos Catalán	BBC One
2021; Commercial Television	Project Blue Book	"Area 51"	François Dagenais	History
2021; Commercial Television	Project Blue Book	"Operation Mainbrace"	C. Kim Miles	History
2021; Non-Commercial Television
2021; Non-Commercial Television	The Crown	"Imbroglio"	Fabian Wagner	Netflix
2021; Non-Commercial Television	Perry Mason	"Chapter 2"	David Franco	HBO
2021; Non-Commercial Television	Lucifer	"It Never Ends Well for the Chicken"	Ken Glassing	Netflix
2021; Non-Commercial Television	The Crown	"Fairytale"	Adriano Goldman	Netflix
2021; Non-Commercial Television	Impulse	"The Moroi"	David Greene	YouTube Premium
2021; Non-Commercial Television	The Marvelous Mrs. Maisel	"It's Comedy or Cabbage"	M. David Mullen	Amazon Prime Video
2022; Commercial Television
2022; Commercial Television	Snowfall	"Weight"	Tommy Maddox-Upshaw	FX
2022; Commercial Television	Snowpiercer	"Our Answer for Everything"	Thomas Burstyn	TNT
2022; Commercial Television	Riverdale	"Chapter Eighty-Nine: Reservoir Dogs"	Ronald Paul Richard	The CW
2022; Commercial Television	Clarice	"Silence is Purgatory"	Brendan Steacy	CBS
2022; Commercial Television	Mayans M.C.	"The Orneriness of Kings"	David Stockton	FX
2022; Commercial Television	Superman & Lois	"Heritage"	Gavin Struthers	The CW
2022; Non-Commercial Television
2022; Non-Commercial Television	Titans	"Souls"	Jon Joffin	HBO Max
2022; Non-Commercial Television	The Handmaid's Tale	"The Wilderness"	Stuart Biddlecombe	Hulu
2022; Non-Commercial Television	Sweet Tooth	"Big Man"	David Garbett	Netflix
2022; Non-Commercial Television	Chapelwaite	"The Promised"	David Greene	Epix
2022; Non-Commercial Television	Titans	"Home"	Boris Mojsovski	HBO Max
2022; Non-Commercial Television	The Nevers	"Hanged"	Kate Reid	HBO
2023; One-Hour Commercial
2023; One-Hour Commercial	The Old Man	"IV"	Jules O'Loughlin	FX
2023; One-Hour Commercial	Better Call Saul	"Saul Gone"	Marshall Adams	AMC
2023; One-Hour Commercial	Interview With the Vampire	"Is My Very Nature That of the Devil"	Jesse M. Feldman	AMC
2023; One-Hour Commercial	Snowfall	"Departures"	Christian Tico Herrera	FX
2023; One-Hour Commercial	Snowpiercer	"Bound by One Track"	Jaime Reynoso	TNT
2023; One-Hour Non-Commercial
2023; One-Hour Non-Commercial	The Marvelous Mrs. Maisel	"How Do You Get to Carnegie Hall?"	M. David Mullen	Prime Video
2023; One-Hour Non-Commercial	Westworld	"Années Folles"	John Conroy	HBO
2023; One-Hour Non-Commercial	House of the Dragon	"The Lord of the Tides"	Catherine Goldschmidt	HBO
2023; One-Hour Non-Commercial	House of the Dragon	"The Green Council"	Alejandro Martinez	HBO
2023; One-Hour Non-Commercial	The Marvelous Mrs. Maisel	"Everything is Bellmore"	Alex Nepomniaschy	Prime Video
2023; One-Hour Non-Commercial	1899	"The Calling"	Nikolaus Summerer	Netflix
2023; Half-Hour
2023; Half-Hour	Barry	"Starting Now"	Carl Herse	Max
2023; Half-Hour	Hacks	"The Brick"	Adam Bricker	Max
2023; Half-Hour	Atlanta	"New Jazz"	Stephen Murphy	FX
2023; Half-Hour	Russian Doll	"Matryoshka"	Ula Pontikos	Netflix
2023; Half-Hour	Atlanta	"Andrew Wyeth. Alfred's World."	Christian Sprenger	FX
2024; Half-Hour
2024; Half-Hour	Barry	“Tricky Legacies”	Carl Herse	Max
2024; Half-Hour	The Diplomat	“The James Bond Clause”	Julian Court	Netflix
2024; Half-Hour	Schmigadoon	“Something Real”	Jon Joffin	Apple TV+
2024; Half-Hour	Minx	“I Thought the Bed was Gonna Fly”	Blake McClure	Starz
2024; Half-Hour	The Bear	"The Bear"	Andrew Wehde	FX
2024; One-Hour
2024; One-Hour	The Marvelous Mrs. Maisel	"Four Minutes"	M. David Mullen	Prime Video
2024; One-Hour	Winning Time: The Rise of the Lakers Dynasty	"The Second Coming"	Ricardo Diaz	Max
2024; One-Hour	Gotham Knights	"Daddy Issues"	Rob C. Givens	CW
2024; One-Hour	Foundation	"In Seldon's Shadow"	Cathal Watters	Apple TV+
2024; One-Hour	Star Trek: Strange New Worlds	"Hegemony"	Glen Keenan	Paramount+
2025
2025	Shōgun	"Crimson Sky"	Sam Mccurdy	FX
2025	The Crown	"Sleep, Dearie Sleep"	Adriano Goldman	Netflix
2025	House of the Dragon	"The Queen Who Ever Was"	Catherine Goldschmidt	HBO
2025	Silo	"The Engineer"	Baz Irvine	Apple TV+
2025	House of the Dragon	"Rhaenyra the Cruel"	Alejandro Martinez	HBO
2025	Shōgun	"Anjin"	Christopher Ross	FX
