= American Society of Cinematographers Award for Outstanding Achievement in Cinematography in an Episode of a One-Hour Television Series – Commercial =

Annual award

The American Society of Cinematographers Award for Outstanding Achievement in Cinematography in an Episode of a One-Hour Television Series – Commercial is an annual award given by the American Society of Cinematographers to cinematographers working in commercial television. It was first awarded in 2016, when the awards separated it Regular Series award, splitting ad-sponsored television programs and non-sponsored, cable or streaming series into two categories. In 2020, the distinction of "One-Hour" was added, as half-hour programs were given their own categories.

== Winners and nominees ==
=== 1980s ===
Year	Program	Episode	Nominees	Network
1987	Outstanding Achievement in Cinematography in Regular Series			
1987	Heart of the Series		Woody Omens	ABC
1987	Amazing Stories	"Go to the Head of the Class"	John McPherson	NBC
1987	L.A. Law	"Pilot"	Reynaldo Villalobos	NBC
1987	Moonlighting	"Blonde on Blonde"	Gerald Finnerman	ABC
1987	Scarecrow and Mrs. King	"Unfinished Business	Richard L. Rawlings	CBS
1988
1988	Paradise	"Stray Bullet"	Richard M. Rawlings Jr.	CBS
1988	Beauty and the Beast	"No Way Down"	Roy H. Wagner	CBS
1988	Beauty and the Beast	"God Bless the Child"	Stevan Larner	CBS
1988	Moonlighting	"Here’s Living With You Kid"	Gerald Finnerman	ABC
1988	Sable	"Toy Gun"	Alex Nepomniaschy	ABC
1989
1989	Murder, She Wrote	"Night of the Tarantula"	John Elsenbach	NBC
1989	Beauty and the Beast	"Snow"	Roy H. Wagner	CBS
1989	Hunter	"Investment in Death"	James Bagdonas	NBC
1989	Paradise	"Common Good"	Richard M. Rawlings Jr.	CBS
1989	Wiseguy	"How Will They Remember Me?"	Frank E. Johnson	CBS

=== 1990s ===
Year	Program	Episode	Nominees	Network
1990
1990	Murder, She Wrote	"Ballad for a Blue Lady"	John Elsenbach	NBC
1990	Gabriel's Fire	"Money Walks"	Victor Goss	ABC
1990	Jake and the Fatman	"God Bless the Child"	James Bagdonas	CBS
1990	Quantum Leap	"Pool Hall Blues"	Michael W. Watkins	NBC
1990	thirtysomething	"The Go Between"	Kenneth D. Zunder	ABC
1991
1991	The Trials of Rosie O'Neill	"This Can’t Be Love"	Jack Priestley	CBS
1991	Columbo	"Death Hits the Jackpot"	George Koblasa	ABC
1991	Jake and the Fatman	"Street of Dreams"	John C. Flinn III	CBS
1991	Quantum Leap	"Dreams"	Michael W. Watkins	NBC
1991	The Young Riders	"Spirits"	Ross A. Maehl	ABC
1992
1992	Jake and the Fatman	"Nightmare"	John C. Flinn III	CBS
1992	Brooklyn Bridge	"The Last Immigrant"	Kenneth D. Zunder	CBS
1992	Northern Exposure	"Cicely"	Frank Prinzi	CBS
1992	Quantum Leap	"Killin' Time"	Michael W. Watkins	NBC
1992	The Young Riders	"Shadow Man"	Ross A. Maehl	ABC
1993
1993	Dr. Quinn, Medicine Woman	"Where the Heart Is"	Roland 'Ozzie' Smith	CBS
1993	NYPD Blue	"Oscar, Meyer, Weiner"	Brian J. Reynolds	ABC
1993	NYPD Blue	"True Confessions"	Bing Sokolsky	ABC
1993	Second Chances	"I Can't Get No Satisfaction"	Lowell Peterson	CBS
1993	The Young Indiana Jones Chronicles	"Istanbul, September 1918"	David Tattersall	ABC
1994
1994	ER	"Day One"	Thomas Del Ruth	NBC
1994	Dr. Quinn, Medicine Woman	"The Washington Affair"	Roland 'Ozzie' Smith	CBS
1994	NYPD Blue	"You Bet Your Life"	Brian J. Reynolds	ABC
1994	Star Trek: Deep Space Nine	"Crossover"	Marvin V. Rush	Syndicated
1994	The X-Files	"Duane Barry"	John Bartley	Fox
1995
1995	Murder One	"Chapter Four"	Aaron Schneider	ABC
1995	Chicago Hope	"Leave of Absence"	Kenneth Zunder	CBS
1995	NYPD Blue	"Heavin' Can Wait"	Brian J. Reynolds	ABC
1995	Tales from the Crypt	"You, Murderer"	Rick Bota	HBO
1995	The X-Files	"Grotesque"	John Bartley	Fox
1996
1996	Murder One	"Chapter Nine"	Aaron Schneider	ABC
1996	Chicago Hope	"A Time to Kill"	James R. Bagdonas	CBS
1996	High Incident	"The Godfather"	Bing Sokolsky	ABC
1996	NYPD Blue	"Closing Time"	Brian J. Reynolds	ABC
1996	The X-Files	"Grotesque"	John Bartley	Fox
1997
1997	3rd Rock from the Sun	"A Nightmare on Dick Street"	Marc Reshovsky	NBC
1997	Ally McBeal	"Silver Bells"	Billy Dickson	Fox
1997	Chicago Hope	"Hope Against Hope"	James R. Bagdonas	CBS
1997	Millennium	"The Thin White Line"	Robert McLachlan	Fox
1997	Prince Street	"God Bless America"	Jonathan Freeman	NBC
1998
1998	The X-Files	"Drive"	Bill Roe	Fox
1998	JAG	"Gypsy Eyes"	Hugo Cortina	CBS
1998	Michael Hayes	"Imagine, Part 2" / "Under Color of Law"	James L. Carter	CBS
1998	Millennium	"Skull and Bones"	Robert McLachlan	Fox
1998	The X-Files	"Travelers"	Joel Ransom	Fox
1999
1999	The X-Files	"Agua Mala"	Bill Roe	Fox
1999	Felicity	"Todd Mulcahy, Part 2"	Robert Primes	The WB
1999	Millennium	"Matryoshka"	Robert McLachlan	Fox
1999	Profiler	"Las Brisas"	Lowell Peterson	NBC
1999	Time of Your Life	"The Time the Millennium Approached"	John Peters	Fox

=== 2000s ===
Year	Program	Episode	Nominees	Network
2000
2000	The West Wing	"Noël"	Thomas Del Ruth	NBC
2000	Ally McBeal	"Ally McBeal: The Musical, Almost"	Billy Dickson	Fox
2000	The Others	"1112"	Shelly Johnson	NBC
2000	The Practice	"The Deal"	Dennis Smith	ABC
2000	Touched by an Angel	"God Bless the Child"	Frank E. Johnson	CBS
2000	The X-Files	"Patience"	Bill Roe	Fox
2001
2001	The West Wing	"Bartlet for America"	Thomas Del Ruth	NBC
2001	Alias	"Time Will Tell"	Michael Bonvillain	ABC
2001	Ally McBeal	"The Wedding"	Billy Dickson	Fox
2001	CSI: Crime Scene Investigation	"Alter Boys"	Michael Barrett	CBS
2001	The X-Files	"This is Not Happening"	Bill Roe	Fox
2002
2002	MDs	"Wing and a Prayer"	Robert Primes	ABC
2002	Alias	"Page 47"	Michael Bonvillain	ABC
2002	Ally McBeal	"Reality Bites"	Billy Dickson	Fox
2002	CSI: Crime Scene Investigation	"Fight Night"	Frank Byers	CBS
2002	CSI: Crime Scene Investigation	"Snuff"	Michael Barrett	CBS
2002	The West Wing	"Holy Night"	Thomas Del Ruth	NBC
2002	The X-Files	"Release"	Bill Roe	Fox
2003
2003	Carnivàle	"Pick a Number"	Jeffrey Jur	HBO
2003	Cold Case	"Time to Hate"	Eric Schmidt	CBS
2003	Crossing Jordan	"Dead Wives Club"	John Aronson	NBC
2003	Threat Matrix	"Dr. Germ"	Chris Manley	ABC
2003	The West Wing	"7A WF 83429"	Thomas Del Ruth	NBC
2004
2004	CSI: Crime Scene Investigation	"Down the Drain"	Nathan Hope	CBS
2004	CSI: NY	"A Man a Mile"	Chris Manley	CBS
2004	Deadwood	"Deep Water"	David Boyd	HBO
2004	The Sopranos	"Long Term Parking"	Alik Sakharov	HBO
2004	The West Wing	"Gaza"	Thomas Del Ruth	NBC
2005
2005	CSI: Crime Scene Investigation	"Who Shot Sherlock?"	Nathan Hope	CBS
2005	Carnivàle	"Los Moscos"	Jeffrey Jur	HBO
2005	Las Vegas	"Everything Old Is You Again"	John C. Newby	NBC
2005	Smallville	"Scared"	Glen Winter	The WB
2005	Without a Trace	"Freefall"	John B. Aronson	CBS
2006
2006	Smallville	"Arrow"	David Moxness	The CW
2006	CSI: Crime Scene Investigation	"Killer"	Nathan Hope	CBS
2006	CSI: Miami	"Darkroom"	Eagle Egilsson	CBS
2006	Day Break	"What If They Find Him"	Bill Roe	ABC
2006	House	"Meaning"	Gale Tattersall	Fox
2007
2007	Smallville	"Noir"	Glen Winter	The CW
2007	The Black Donnellys	"All of Us Are in the Gutter"	Russell Lee Fine	NBC
2007	CSI: Crime Scene Investigation	"Happy Ending"	James L. Carter	CBS
2007	CSI: Miami	"Inside Out"	Eagle Egilsson	CBS
2007	Women's Murder Club	"Welcome to the Club"	John Fleckenstein	ABC
2008
2008	CSI: Crime Scene Investigation	"For Gedda"	Nelson Cragg	CBS
2008	Flashpoint	"Who's George?"	Stephen Reizes	CBS
2008	House	"House's Head"	Gale Tattersall	Fox
2008	Smallville	"Fracture"	Glen Winter	The CW
2008	The Tudors	"Everything Is Beautiful"	Ousama Rawi	Showtime
2009	Outstanding Achievement in Cinematography in Regular Series One Episode/Pilot			
2009	Dark Blue	"Venice Kings"	Eagle Egilsson	TNT
2009	CSI: Crime Scene Investigation	"Family Affair"	Christian Sebaldt	CBS
2009	FlashForward	"The Gift"	Jeffrey Jur	ABC
2009	Smallville	"Savior"	Glen Winter	The CW
2009	Ugly Betty	"There's No Place Like Mode"	Michael Price	ABC

=== 2010s ===
Year	Program	Episode	Nominees	Network
2010
2010	Boardwalk Empire	"Home"	Jonathan Freeman	HBO
2010	Boardwalk Empire	"Family Limitation"	Kramer Morgenthau	HBO
2010	Dark Blue	"Shell Game"	Eagle Egilsson	TNT
2010	Mad Men	"Blowing Smoke"	Christopher Manley	AMC
2010	Nikita	"Pilot"	David Stockton	The CW
2010	Smallville	"Abandoned"	Glen Winter	The CW
2010	Smallville	"Shield"	Michael Wale	The CW
2011	Outstanding Achievement in Cinematography in Regular Series One-Hour Television			
2011	Boardwalk Empire	"21"	Jonathan Freeman	HBO
2011	Boardwalk Empire	"To the Lost"	David Franco	HBO
2011	Chase	"Narco, Part 2"	David Stockton	NBC
2011	Downton Abbey	"Pilot"	David Katznelson	PBS
2011	Pan Am	"Pilot"	John Lindley	ABC
2012
2012	Game of Thrones	"The North Remembers"	Kramer Morgenthau	HBO
2012	Hunted	"Mort"	Balazs Bolygo	Cinemax
2012	Alcatraz	"Pilot"	David Stockton	Fox
2012	Fringe	"Letters of Transit"	David Moxness	Fox
2012	Mad Men	"The Phantom"	Christopher Manley	AMC
2012	Strike Back	"Episode 11"	Michael Spragg	Cinemax
2013
2013	Game of Thrones	"Valar Dohaeris"	Jonathan Freeman	HBO
2013	Beauty & the Beast	"Tough Love"	David Greene	The CW
2013	Boardwalk Empire	"Erlkönig"	David Franco	HBO
2013	The Borgias	"The Purge"	Pierre Gill	Showtime
2013	Dracula	"The Blood Is the Life"	Ousama Rawi	NBC
2013	Game of Thrones	"Kissed by Fire"	Anette Haellmigk	HBO
2013	Magic City	"The Sins of the Father"	Steven Bernstein	Starz
2013	Sleepy Hollow	"Pilot"	Kramer Morgenthau	Fox
2014	Outstanding Achievement in Cinematography in Television Series			
2014	Boardwalk Empire	"Golden Days for Boys and Girls"	Jonathan Freeman	HBO
2014	Game of Thrones	"Mockingbird"	Fabian Wagner	HBO
2014	Game of Thrones	"The Children"	Anette Haellmigk	HBO
2014	Gotham	"Spirit of the Goat"	Christopher Norr	Fox
2014	Manhattan	"Perestroika"	Richard Rutkowski	WGN America
2014	Vikings	"Blood Eagle"	PJ Dillon	History
2015
2015	Marco Polo	"The Fourth Step"	Vanja Černjul	Netflix
2015	Game of Thrones	"Hardhome"	Fabian Wagner	HBO
2015	Gotham	"Rise of the Villains: Scarification"	Crescenzo Notarile	Fox
2015	Gotham	"Rise of the Villains: Strike Force"	Christopher Norr	Fox
2015	12 Monkeys	"Mentally Divergent"	David Greene	Syfy
2016	Outstanding Achievement in Cinematography in Regular Series for Commercial Television			
2016	Mr. Robot	"eps2.0_unm4sk-pt1.tc"	Tod Campbell	USA
2016	Gotham	"Wrath of the Villains: Mr. Freeze"	Christopher Norr	Fox
2016	Manhattan	"Jupiter"	Richard Rutkowski	WGN America
2016	Preacher	"Finish the Song"	John Grillo	AMC
2016	Underground	"The Macon 7"	Kevin McKnight	WGN America
2017	Outstanding Achievement in Cinematography in Episode of a Series for Commercial Television			
2017	12 Monkeys	"Thief"	Boris Mojsovski	Syfy
2017	Gotham	"The Executioner"	Crescenzo Notarile	Fox
2017	Legion	"Chapter 1"	Dana Gonzales	FX
2017	The Originals	"Bag of Cobras"	Kurt Jones	The CW
2017	12 Monkeys	"Mother"	David Greene	Syfy
2018
2018	Beyond	"Two Zero One"	Jon Joffin	Freeform
2018	Damnation	"A Different Species"	Dana Gonzales	USA
2018	Gotham	"A Dark Knight: Queen Takes Knight"	David Stockton	Fox
2018	Timeless	"The King of the Delta Blues"	Nathaniel Goodman	NBC
2018	Yellowstone	"Daybreak"	Ben Richardson	Paramount Network
2019
2019	Project Blue Book	"The Flatwoods Monster"	C. Kim Miles	History
2019	Gotham	"Legend of the Dark Knight: Ace Chemicals"	David Stockton	Fox
2019	Legion	"Chapter 20"	Dana Gonzales	FX
2019	Legion	"Chapter 23"	Polly Morgan	FX
2019	Vikings	"Hell"	Peter Robertson	History

=== 2020s ===
Year	Program	Episode	Nominees	Network
2020	Outstanding Achievement in Cinematography in an Episode of a One-Hour Television Series – Commercial			
2020	Motherland: Fort Salem	"Up is Down"	Jon Joffin	Freeform
2020	Better Call Saul	"Bagman"	Marshall Adams	AMC
2020	Killing Eve	"Meetings Have Biscuits"	Carlos Catalán	BBC One
2020	Project Blue Book	"Area 51"	François Dagenais	History
2020	Project Blue Book	"Operation Mainbrace"	C. Kim Miles	History
2021
2021	Snowfall	"Weight"	Tommy Maddox-Upshaw	FX
2021	Clarice	"Silence is Purgatory"	Brendan Steacy	CBS
2021	Mayans M.C.	"The Orneriness of Kings"	David Stockman	FX
2021	Riverdale	"Chapter Eighty-Nin: Reservoir Dogs"	Ronald Paul Richard	The CW
2021	Snowpiercer	"Our Answer for Everything"	Thomas Burstyn	TNT
2021	Superman & Lois	"Heritage"	Gavin Struthers	The CW
2022
2022	The Old Man	"IV"	Jules O'Loughlin	FX
2022	Better Call Saul	"Saul Gone"	Marshall Adams	AMC
2022	Interview with the Vampire	"Is My Very Nature That of a Devil"	Jesse M. Feldman	AMC
2022	Snowfall	"Departures"	Christian "Tico" Herrera	FX
2022	Snowpiercer	"Bound By One Track"	Jaime Reynoso	TNT
