= American Society of Cinematographers Award for Outstanding Achievement in Cinematography in an Episode of a One-Hour Television Series – Non-Commercial =

Annual award

The American Society of Cinematographers Award for Outstanding Achievement in Cinematography in an Episode of a One-Hour Television Series – Non-Commercial is an annual award given by the American Society of Cinematographers to cinematographers working in non-commercial television. It was first awarded in 2016, when the awards separated it Regular Series award, splitting ad-sponsored television programs and non-sponsored, cable or streaming series into two categories. In 2020, the distinction of "One-Hour" was added, as half-hour programs were given their own categories.

== Winners and nominees ==
=== 1980s ===
| Year | Program | Episode | Nominees | Network |
|---|---|---|---|---|
| 1987 | Outstanding Achievement in Cinematography in Regular Series | | | |
| 1987 | Heart of the Series | | Woody Omens | ABC |
| 1987 | Amazing Stories | "Go to the Head of the Class" | John McPherson | NBC |
| 1987 | L.A. Law | "Pilot" | Reynaldo Villalobos | NBC |
| 1987 | Moonlighting | "Blonde on Blonde" | Gerald Finnerman | ABC |
| 1987 | Scarecrow and Mrs. King | "Unfinished Business | Richard L. Rawlings | CBS |
1988
| 1988 | Paradise | "Stray Bullet" | Richard M. Rawlings Jr. | CBS |
| 1988 | Beauty and the Beast | "No Way Down" | Roy H. Wagner | CBS |
| 1988 | Beauty and the Beast | "God Bless the Child" | Stevan Larner | CBS |
| 1988 | Moonlighting | "Here’s Living With You Kid" | Gerald Finnerman | ABC |
| 1988 | Sable | "Toy Gun" | Alex Nepomniaschy | ABC |
1989
| 1989 | Murder, She Wrote | "Night of the Tarantula" | John Elsenbach | NBC |
| 1989 | Beauty and the Beast | "Snow" | Roy H. Wagner | CBS |
| 1989 | Hunter | "Investment in Death" | James Bagdonas | NBC |
| 1989 | Paradise | "Common Good" | Richard M. Rawlings Jr. | CBS |
| 1989 | Wiseguy | "How Will They Remember Me?" | Frank E. Johnson | CBS |

=== 1990s ===
| Year | Program | Episode | Nominees | Network |
|---|---|---|---|---|
1990
| 1990 | Murder, She Wrote | "Ballad for a Blue Lady" | John Elsenbach | NBC |
| 1990 | Gabriel's Fire | "Money Walks" | Victor Goss | ABC |
| 1990 | Jake and the Fatman | "God Bless the Child" | James Bagdonas | CBS |
| 1990 | Quantum Leap | "Pool Hall Blues" | Michael W. Watkins | NBC |
| 1990 | thirtysomething | "The Go Between" | Kenneth D. Zunder | ABC |
1991
| 1991 | The Trials of Rosie O'Neill | "This Can’t Be Love" | Jack Priestley | CBS |
| 1991 | Columbo | "Death Hits the Jackpot" | George Koblasa | ABC |
| 1991 | Jake and the Fatman | "Street of Dreams" | John C. Flinn III | CBS |
| 1991 | Quantum Leap | "Dreams" | Michael W. Watkins | NBC |
| 1991 | The Young Riders | "Spirits" | Ross A. Maehl | ABC |
1992
| 1992 | Jake and the Fatman | "Nightmare" | John C. Flinn III | CBS |
| 1992 | Brooklyn Bridge | "The Last Immigrant" | Kenneth D. Zunder | CBS |
| 1992 | Northern Exposure | "Cicely" | Frank Prinzi | CBS |
| 1992 | Quantum Leap | "Killin' Time" | Michael W. Watkins | NBC |
| 1992 | The Young Riders | "Shadow Man" | Ross A. Maehl | ABC |
1993
| 1993 | Dr. Quinn, Medicine Woman | "Where the Heart Is" | Roland 'Ozzie' Smith | CBS |
| 1993 | NYPD Blue | "Oscar, Meyer, Weiner" | Brian J. Reynolds | ABC |
| 1993 | NYPD Blue | "True Confessions" | Bing Sokolsky | ABC |
| 1993 | Second Chances | "I Can't Get No Satisfaction" | Lowell Peterson | CBS |
| 1993 | The Young Indiana Jones Chronicles | "Istanbul, September 1918" | David Tattersall | ABC |
1994
| 1994 | ER | "Day One" | Thomas Del Ruth | NBC |
| 1994 | Dr. Quinn, Medicine Woman | "The Washington Affair" | Roland 'Ozzie' Smith | CBS |
| 1994 | NYPD Blue | "You Bet Your Life" | Brian J. Reynolds | ABC |
| 1994 | Star Trek: Deep Space Nine | "Crossover" | Marvin V. Rush | Syndicated |
| 1994 | The X-Files | "Duane Barry" | John Bartley | Fox |
1995
| 1995 | Murder One | "Chapter Four" | Aaron Schneider | ABC |
| 1995 | Chicago Hope | "Leave of Absence" | Kenneth Zunder | CBS |
| 1995 | NYPD Blue | "Heavin' Can Wait" | Brian J. Reynolds | ABC |
| 1995 | Tales from the Crypt | "You, Murderer" | Rick Bota | HBO |
| 1995 | The X-Files | "Grotesque" | John Bartley | Fox |
1996
| 1996 | Murder One | "Chapter Nine" | Aaron Schneider | ABC |
| 1996 | Chicago Hope | "A Time to Kill" | James R. Bagdonas | CBS |
| 1996 | High Incident | "The Godfather" | Bing Sokolsky | ABC |
| 1996 | NYPD Blue | "Closing Time" | Brian J. Reynolds | ABC |
| 1996 | The X-Files | "Grotesque" | John Bartley | Fox |
1997
| 1997 | 3rd Rock from the Sun | "A Nightmare on Dick Street" | Marc Reshovsky | NBC |
| 1997 | Ally McBeal | "Silver Bells" | Billy Dickson | Fox |
| 1997 | Chicago Hope | "Hope Against Hope" | James R. Bagdonas | CBS |
| 1997 | Millennium | "The Thin White Line" | Robert McLachlan | Fox |
| 1997 | Prince Street | "God Bless America" | Jonathan Freeman | NBC |
1998
| 1998 | The X-Files | "Drive" | Bill Roe | Fox |
| 1998 | JAG | "Gypsy Eyes" | Hugo Cortina | CBS |
| 1998 | Michael Hayes | "Imagine, Part 2" / "Under Color of Law" | James L. Carter | CBS |
| 1998 | Millennium | "Skull and Bones" | Robert McLachlan | Fox |
| 1998 | The X-Files | "Travelers" | Joel Ransom | Fox |
1999
| 1999 | The X-Files | "Agua Mala" | Bill Roe | Fox |
| 1999 | Felicity | "Todd Mulcahy, Part 2" | Robert Primes | The WB |
| 1999 | Millennium | "Matryoshka" | Robert McLachlan | Fox |
| 1999 | Profiler | "Las Brisas" | Lowell Peterson | NBC |
| 1999 | Time of Your Life | "The Time the Millennium Approached" | John Peters | Fox |

=== 2000s ===
| Year | Program | Episode | Nominees | Network |
|---|---|---|---|---|
2000
| 2000 | The West Wing | "Noël" | Thomas Del Ruth | NBC |
| 2000 | Ally McBeal | "Ally McBeal: The Musical, Almost" | Billy Dickson | Fox |
| 2000 | The Others | "1112" | Shelly Johnson | NBC |
| 2000 | The Practice | "The Deal" | Dennis Smith | ABC |
| 2000 | Touched by an Angel | "God Bless the Child" | Frank E. Johnson | CBS |
| 2000 | The X-Files | "Patience" | Bill Roe | Fox |
2001
| 2001 | The West Wing | "Bartlet for America" | Thomas Del Ruth | NBC |
| 2001 | Alias | "Time Will Tell" | Michael Bonvillain | ABC |
| 2001 | Ally McBeal | "The Wedding" | Billy Dickson | Fox |
| 2001 | CSI: Crime Scene Investigation | "Alter Boys”" | Michael Barrett | CBS |
| 2001 | The X-Files | "This is Not Happening" | Bill Roe | Fox |
2002
| 2002 | MDs | "Wing and a Prayer" | Robert Primes | ABC |
| 2002 | Alias | "Page 47" | Michael Bonvillain | ABC |
| 2002 | Ally McBeal | "Reality Bites" | Billy Dickson | Fox |
| 2002 | CSI: Crime Scene Investigation | "Fight Night" | Frank Byers | CBS |
| 2002 | CSI: Crime Scene Investigation | "Snuff" | Michael Barrett | CBS |
| 2002 | The West Wing | "Holy Night" | Thomas Del Ruth | NBC |
| 2002 | The X-Files | "Release" | Bill Roe | Fox |
2003
| 2003 | Carnivàle | "Pick a Number" | Jeffrey Jur | HBO |
| 2003 | Cold Case | "Time to Hate" | Eric Schmidt | CBS |
| 2003 | Crossing Jordan | "Dead Wives Club" | John Aronson | NBC |
| 2003 | Threat Matrix | "Dr. Germ" | Chris Manley | ABC |
| 2003 | The West Wing | "7A WF 83429" | Thomas Del Ruth | NBC |
2004
| 2004 | CSI: Crime Scene Investigation | "Down the Drain" | Nathan Hope | CBS |
| 2004 | CSI: NY | "A Man a Mile" | Chris Manley | CBS |
| 2004 | Deadwood | "Deep Water" | David Boyd | HBO |
| 2004 | The Sopranos | "Long Term Parking" | Alik Sakharov | HBO |
| 2004 | The West Wing | "Gaza" | Thomas Del Ruth | NBC |
2005
| 2005 | CSI: Crime Scene Investigation | "Who Shot Sherlock?" | Nathan Hope | CBS |
| 2005 | Carnivàle | "Los Moscos" | Jeffrey Jur | HBO |
| 2005 | Las Vegas | "Everything Old Is You Again" | John C. Newby | NBC |
| 2005 | Smallville | "Scared" | Glen Winter | The WB |
| 2005 | Without a Trace | "Freefall" | John B. Aronson | CBS |
2006
| 2006 | Smallville | "Arrow" | David Moxness | The CW |
| 2006 | CSI: Crime Scene Investigation | "Killer" | Nathan Hope | CBS |
| 2006 | CSI: Miami | "Darkroom" | Eagle Egilsson | CBS |
| 2006 | Day Break | "What If They Find Him" | Bill Roe | ABC |
| 2006 | House | "Meaning" | Gale Tattersall | Fox |
2007
| 2007 | Smallville | "Noir" | Glen Winter | The CW |
| 2007 | The Black Donnellys | "All of Us Are in the Gutter" | Russell Lee Fine | NBC |
| 2007 | CSI: Crime Scene Investigation | "Happy Ending" | James L. Carter | CBS |
| 2007 | CSI: Miami | "Inside Out" | Eagle Egilsson | CBS |
| 2007 | Women's Murder Club | "Welcome to the Club" | John Fleckenstein | ABC |
2008
| 2008 | CSI: Crime Scene Investigation | "For Gedda" | Nelson Cragg | CBS |
| 2008 | Flashpoint | "Who's George?" | Stephen Reizes | CBS |
| 2008 | House | "House's Head" | Gale Tattersall | Fox |
| 2008 | Smallville | "Fracture" | Glen Winter | The CW |
| 2008 | The Tudors | "Everything Is Beautiful" | Ousama Rawi | Showtime |
| 2009 | Outstanding Achievement in Cinematography in Regular Series One Episode/Pilot | | | |
| 2009 | Dark Blue | "Venice Kings" | Eagle Egilsson | TNT |
| 2009 | CSI: Crime Scene Investigation | "Family Affair" | Christian Sebaldt | CBS |
| 2009 | FlashForward | "The Gift" | Jeffrey Jur | ABC |
| 2009 | Smallville | "Savior" | Glen Winter | The CW |
| 2009 | Ugly Betty | "There's No Place Like Mode" | Michael Price | ABC |

=== 2010s ===
| Year | Program | Episode | Nominees | Network |
|---|---|---|---|---|
2010
| 2010 | Boardwalk Empire | "Home" | Jonathan Freeman | HBO |
| 2010 | Boardwalk Empire | "Family Limitation" | Kramer Morgenthau | HBO |
| 2010 | Dark Blue | "Shell Game" | Eagle Egilsson | TNT |
| 2010 | Mad Men | "Blowing Smoke" | Christopher Manley | AMC |
| 2010 | Nikita | "Pilot" | David Stockton | The CW |
| 2010 | Smallville | "Abandoned" | Glen Winter | The CW |
| 2010 | Smallville | "Shield" | Michael Wale | The CW |
| 2011 | Outstanding Achievement in Cinematography in Regular Series One-Hour Television | | | |
| 2011 | Boardwalk Empire | "21" | Jonathan Freeman | HBO |
| 2011 | Boardwalk Empire | "To the Lost" | David Franco | HBO |
| 2011 | Chase | "Narco, Part 2" | David Stockton | NBC |
| 2011 | Downton Abbey | "Pilot" | David Katznelson | PBS |
| 2011 | Pan Am | "Pilot" | John Lindley | ABC |
2012
| 2012 | Game of Thrones | "The North Remembers" | Kramer Morgenthau | HBO |
| 2012 | Hunted | "Mort" | Balazs Bolygo | Cinemax |
| 2012 | Alcatraz | "Pilot" | David Stockton | Fox |
| 2012 | Fringe | "Letters of Transit" | David Moxness | Fox |
| 2012 | Mad Men | "The Phantom" | Christopher Manley | AMC |
| 2012 | Strike Back | "Episode 11" | Michael Spragg | Cinemax |
2013
| 2013 | Game of Thrones | "Valar Dohaeris" | Jonathan Freeman | HBO |
| 2013 | Beauty & the Beast | "Tough Love" | David Greene | The CW |
| 2013 | Boardwalk Empire | "Erlkönig" | David Franco | HBO |
| 2013 | The Borgias | "The Purge" | Pierre Gill | Showtime |
| 2013 | Dracula | "The Blood Is the Life" | Ousama Rawi | NBC |
| 2013 | Game of Thrones | "Kissed by Fire" | Anette Haellmigk | HBO |
| 2013 | Magic City | "The Sins of the Father" | Steven Bernstein | Starz |
| 2013 | Sleepy Hollow | "Pilot" | Kramer Morgenthau | Fox |
| 2014 | Outstanding Achievement in Cinematography in Television Series | | | |
| 2014 | Boardwalk Empire | "Golden Days for Boys and Girls" | Jonathan Freeman | HBO |
| 2014 | Game of Thrones | "Mockingbird" | Fabian Wagner | HBO |
| 2014 | Game of Thrones | "The Children" | Anette Haellmigk | HBO |
| 2014 | Gotham | "Spirit of the Goat" | Christopher Norr | Fox |
| 2014 | Manhattan | "Perestroika" | Richard Rutkowski | WGN America |
| 2014 | Vikings | "Blood Eagle" | PJ Dillon | History |
2015
| 2015 | Marco Polo | "The Fourth Step" | Vanja Černjul | Netflix |
| 2015 | Game of Thrones | "Hardhome" | Fabian Wagner | HBO |
| 2015 | Gotham | "Rise of the Villains: Scarification" | Crescenzo Notarile | Fox |
| 2015 | Gotham | "Rise of the Villains: Strike Force" | Christopher Norr | Fox |
| 2015 | 12 Monkeys | "Mentally Divergent" | David Greene | Syfy |
| 2016 | Outstanding Achievement in Cinematography in Regular Series for Non-Commercial Television | | | |
| 2016 | Game of Thrones | "Battle of the Bastards" | Fabian Wagner | HBO |
| 2016 | Game of Thrones | "Book of the Stranger" | Anette Haellmigk | HBO |
| 2016 | House of Cards | "Chapter 45" | David M. Dunlap | Netflix |
| 2016 | Outlander | "Prestonpans" | Neville Kidd | Starz |
| 2016 | Penny Dreadful | "The Day Tennyson Died" | John Conroy | Showtime |
| 2017 | Outstanding Achievement in Cinematography in Episode of a Series for Non-Commercial Television | | | |
| 2017 | The Crown | "Smoke and Mirrors" | Adriano Goldman | Netflix |
| 2017 | Game of Thrones | "Dragonstone" | Gregory Middleton | Fox |
| 2017 | Game of Thrones | "The Spoils of War" | Robert McLachlan | Fox |
| 2017 | Outlander | "The Battle Joined" | Alasdair Walker | Starz |
| 2017 | The Man in the High Castle | "Land O' Smiles" | Gonzalo Amat | Amazon |
2018
| 2018 | The Crown | "Beryl" | Adriano Goldman | Netflix |
| 2018 | The Handmaid's Tale | "Holly" | Zoë White | Hulu |
| 2018 | The Handmaid's Tale | "The Word" | Colin Watkinson | Hulu |
| 2018 | Homeland | "Paean to the People" | David Klein | Showtime |
| 2018 | The Man in the High Castle | "Jahr Null" | Gonzalo Amat | Amazon |
| 2018 | Peaky Blinders | "The Company" | Cathal Watters | Netflix |
2019
| 2019 | The Handmaid's Tale | "Night" | Colin Watkinson | Hulu |
| 2019 | Carnival Row | "Grieve No More" | Chris Seager | Amazon |
| 2019 | Das Boot | "Gegen die Zeit" | David Luther | Hulu |
| 2019 | The Marvelous Mrs. Maisel | "Simone" | M. David Mullen | Amazon |
| 2019 | Titans | "Dick Grayson" | Brendan Steacy | DC Universe |

=== 2020s ===
| Year | Program | Episode | Nominees | Network |
|---|---|---|---|---|
| 2020 | Outstanding Achievement in Cinematography in an Episode of a One-Hour Television Series – Non-Commercial | | | |
| 2020 | The Crown | "Imbroglio" | Fabian Wagner | Netflix |
| 2020 | The Crown | "Fairytale" | Adriano Goldman | Netflix |
| 2020 | Impulse | "The Moroi" | David Greene | YouTube Premium |
| 2020 | Lucifer | "It Never Ends Well for the Chicken" | Ken Glassing | Netflix |
| 2020 | The Marvelous Mrs. Maisel | "It's Comedy or Cabbage" | M. David Mullen | Amazon |
| 2020 | Perry Mason | "Chapter Two" | David Franco | HBO |
2021
| 2021 | Titans | "Souls" | Jon Joffin | HBO Max |
| 2021 | Chapelwaite | "The Promised" | David Greene | Epix |
| 2021 | The Handmaid's Tale | "The Wilderness" | Stuart Biddlecombe | Hulu |
| 2021 | The Nevers | "Hanged" | Kate Reid | HBO |
| 2021 | Sweet Tooth | "Big Man" | David Garbett | Netflix |
| 2021 | Titans | "Home" | Boris Mojsovski | HBO Max |
2022
| 2022 | The Marvelous Mrs. Maisel | "How Do You Get to Carnegie Hall?" | M. David Mullen | Amazon |
| 2022 | 1899 | "The Calling" | Nikolaus Summerer | Netflix |
| 2022 | House of the Dragon | "The Green Council" | Alejandro Martinez | HBO |
| 2022 | House of the Dragon | "The Lord of the Tides" | Catherine Goldschmidt | HBO |
| 2022 | The Marvelous Mrs. Maisel | "Everything Is Bellmore" | Alex Nepomniaschy | Amazon |
| 2022 | Westworld | "Années Folles" | John Conroy | HBO |

== Programs with multiple wins ==
Totals from combined category included.

3 wins

- Boardwalk Empire (HBO)
- The Crown (Netflix)
- CSI: Crime Scene Investigation (CBS)
- Game of Thrones (HBO)

2 wins

- Murder One (ABC)
- Murder, She Wrote (NBC)
- Smallville (The CW)
- The West Wing (NBC)
- The X-Files (Fox)

== Programs with multiple nominations ==
Totals from combined category included.

10 nominations

- Game of Thrones (HBO)

9 nominations

- CSI: Crime Scene Investigation (CBS)
- The X-Files (Fox)

7 nominations

- Boardwalk Empire (HBO)
- Smallville (The WB/CW)

5 nominations

- NYPD Blue (ABC)
- The West Wing (NBC)

4 nominations

- Ally McBeal (Fox)
- The Crown (Netflix)
- The Handmaid's Tale (Hulu)
- The Marvelous Mrs. Maisel (Amazon)

3 nominations

- Beauty and the Beast (CBS)
- Chicago Hope (CBS)
- Gotham (Fox)
- Jake and the Fatman (CBS)
- Millennium (Fox)
- Quantum Leap (NBC)
- Titans (DC Universe/HBO Max)

2 nominations

- Alias (ABC)
- Carnivàle (HBO)
- CSI: Miami (CBS)
- Dark Blue (TNT)
- Dr. Quinn, Medicine Woman (CBS)
- House (Fox)
- House of the Dragon (HBO)
- Moonlighting (ABC)
- Mad Men (AMC)
- The Man in the High Castle (Amazon)
- Murder One (ABC)
- Murder, She Wrote (NBC)
- Outlander (Starz)
- Paradise (CBS)
- The Young Riders (ABC)
