= American Society of Cinematographers Spotlight Award =

Annual award

The American Society of Cinematographers Spotlight Award is an annual award given by the American Society of Cinematographers to cinematographers working in features and documentaries that are typically screened at film festivals, in limited theatrical release, or outside the United States. It was first awarded in 2014.

== Winners and nominees ==
=== 2010s ===
| Year | Film | Cinematographer(s) |
|---|---|---|
2013
| 2013 | Ida | Łukasz Żal and Ryszard Lenczewski |
| 2013 | Renoir | Mark Lee Ping Bin |
| 2013 | Winter Nomads | Camille Cottagnoud |
2014
| 2014 | Concrete Night (Betoniyö) | Peter Flinckenberg |
| 2014 | The Immigrant | Darius Khondji |
| 2014 | Under the Skin | Daniel Landin |
2015
| 2015 | Macbeth | Adam Arkapaw |
| 2015 | Son of Saul | Mátyás Erdély |
| 2015 | Beasts of No Nation | Cary Joji Fukunaga |
2016
| 2016 | House of Others | Gorka Gómez Andreu |
| 2016 | The Childhood of a Leader | Lol Crawley |
| 2016 | My Angel | Juliette Van Dormael |
| 2016 | Tempestad | Ernesto Pardo |
2017
| 2017 | November | Mart Taniel |
| 2017 | Loveless | Mikhail Krichman |
| 2017 | On Body and Soul | Máté Herbai |
2018
| 2018 | Namme | Giorgi Shvelidze |
| 2018 | Girl | Frank van den Eeden |
| 2018 | The Rider | Joshua James Richards |
2019
| 2019 | The Lighthouse | Jarin Blaschke |
| 2019 | Honey Boy | Natasha Braier |
| 2019 | Monos | Jasper Wolf |

=== 2020s ===
| Year | Film | Cinematographer(s) |
|---|---|---|
2020
| 2020 | Two of Us | Aurélien Marra |
| 2020 | Dear Comrades! | Andrey Naydenov |
| 2020 | Swallow | Katelin Arizmendi |
2021
| 2021 | Pig | Pat Scola |
| 2021 | Titane | Ruben Impens |
| 2021 | Jockey | Adolpho Veloso |
2022
| 2022 | War Sailor | Sturla Brandth Grøvlen |
| 2022 | The Quiet Girl | Kate McCullough |
| 2022 | God's Country | Andrew Wheeler |
2023
| 2023 | The New Boy | Warwick Thornton |
| 2023 | Story Ave | Eric Branco |
| 2023 | Citizen Saint | Krum Rodriguez |
2024
| 2024 | Nickel Boys | Jomo Fray |
| 2024 | The Girl with the Needle | Michał Dymek |
| 2024 | Nawi | Klaus Kneist and Renata Mwende |

== See also ==
- Academy Award for Best Cinematography
