= 2021 American Society of Cinematographers Awards =

2022 ceremony awarding excellence in cinematography

36th ASC Awards
- Date: March 20, 2022

The 36th American Society of Cinematographers Awards were held on March 20, 2022, honoring the best cinematographers of film and television in 2021. The nominees were announced on January 25, 2022.

== Winners and nominees ==
=== Film ===
Winners listed first and in bold.

Outstanding Achievement in Cinematography in Theatrical Releases	Spotlight Award
**Greig Fraser, ASC, ACS – Dune**; Bruno Delbonnel, ASC, AFC – The Tragedy of Macbeth; Dan Laustsen, ASC, DFF – Nightmare Alley; Ari Wegner, ACS – The Power of the Dog; Haris Zambarloukos, BSC, GSC – Belfast	**Pat Scola – Pig**; Ruben Impens, SBC – Titane; Adolpho Veloso, ABC – Jockey
Outstanding Achievement in Cinematography in Documentary
**Jessica Beshir – Faya Dayi**; Isabel Bethencourt and Parker Hill – Cusp; Daniel Schönauer and Jan Haft – The Hidden Life of Trees

=== Television ===
Outstanding Achievement in Cinematography in an Episode of a One-Hour Television Series – Non-Commercial	Outstanding Achievement in Cinematography in an Episode of a One-Hour Television Series – Commercial
**Jon Joffin, ASC – Titans (Episode: "Souls") (HBO Max)**; Stuart Biddlecombe – The Handmaid's Tale (Episode: "The Wilderness") (Hulu); David Garbett – Sweet Tooth (Episode: "Big Man") (Netflix); David Greene, ASC, CSC – Chapelwaite (Episode: "The Promised") (Epix); Boris Mojsovski, ASC, CSC – Titans (Episode: "Home") (HBO Max); Kate Reid, BSC – The Nevers (Episode: "Hanged") (HBO)	**Tommy Maddox-Upshaw, ASC – Snowfall (Episode: "Weight") (FX)**; Thomas Burstyn, CSC, NZSC – Snowpiercer (Episode: "Our Answer for Everything") (TNT); Ronald Paul Richard – Riverdale (Episode: "Chapter Eighty-Nine: Reservoir Dogs") (The CW); Brendan Steacy, CSC – Clarice (Episode: "Silence is Purgatory") (CBS); David Stockton, ASC – Mayans M.C. (Episode: "The Orneriness of Kings") (FX); Gavin Struthers, ASC, BSC – Superman & Lois (Episode: "Heritage") (The CW)
Outstanding Achievement in Cinematography in Motion Picture, Miniseries, or Pilot Made for Television	Outstanding Achievement in Cinematography in an Episode of a Half-Hour Television Series
**James Laxton, ASC – The Underground Railroad (Episode: "Chapter 9: Indiana Winter") (Amazon Prime Video)**; Stevie Annis – Foundation (Episode: "The Emperor's Peace") (Apple TV+); Tim Ives, ASC – Halston (Episode: "The Party’s Over") (Netflix); Christophe Nuyens, SBC – Lupin (Episode: "Chapter 1") (Netflix); Ben Richardson, ASC – Mare of Easttown (Episode: "Illusions") (HBO)	**Michael Berlucchi and Marc Carter – Mythic Quest (Episode: "Backstory!") (Apple TV+)**; Marshall Adams, ASC – Servant (Episode: "2:00") (Apple TV+); Adam Bricker – Hacks (Episode: "There is No Line") (HBO Max); Paula Huidobro – Physical (Episode: "Let's Get Together") (Apple TV+); Jamie Reynoso, AMC – The Kominsky Method (Episode: "And it's Getting More and More Absurd") (Netflix)
