= Martin Ahlgren =

Swedish cinematographer

- Born: Scotland
- Occupation: Cinematographer
- Years active: 2000–present
- Website: martinahlgren.com

Martin Ahlgren, ASC is a Swedish cinematographer.

== Early life ==
Ahlgren was born in Scotland to Swedish parents. The family soon returned to Sweden, where Ahlgren grew up in Stockholm. He later moved to the U.S. and attended the School of Visual Arts in New York City.

== Career ==
After a decade of working on campaigns for major brands around the world and music videos for artists such as The Rolling Stones, Beyoncé, and Kanye West, Ahlgren began working on independent feature films and television series. His credits include films such as The Sunlit Night and series such as House of Cards, Daredevil, Altered Carbon, and The Plot Against America, as well as the Netflix comedy special Aziz Ansari: Buried Alive and the pilot episodes for Blindspot and NOS4A2.

Ahlgren has been a member of the American Society of Cinematographers since 2020.

== Filmography ==
=== Film ===
Year	Title	Notes
2013	McCanick	
2013	Aziz Ansari: Buried Alive	
2014	Revenge of the Green Dragons	
2015	Stealing Cars	
2019	The Sunlit Night	
2020	Chart Your Course - The Musical Journey of Cas Haley	Documentary short
2024	Old Guy	
2026	Greenland 2: Migration	
2026	Shelter	
TBA	The Silence of Mercy	

=== Television ===
Year	Title	Notes
2003	Anna Netrebko: The Woman, the Voice	Television documentary film
2006	Breaking Up with Shannen Doherty	2 episodes As camera operator
2013	Over/Under	Television film
2013	Six by Sondheim	Television documentary film
2014	Power	4 episodes
2014	Death Pact	Television film
2015	House of Cards	11 episodes
2015	Blindspot	1 episode
2016	Daredevil	13 episodes
2016	Civil	Television film
2017	Crash & Burn	Television film
2018	Altered Carbon	5 episodes
2019	NOS4A2	2 episodes
2020	The Plot Against America	6 episodes

== Awards and nominations ==
Year	Award	Category	Nominated work	Result	Ref.
2015	67th Primetime Creative Arts Emmy Awards	Outstanding Cinematography for a Single-Camera Series	"Chapter 29"; House of Cards	Nominated	
2016	30th American Society of Cinematographers Awards	Outstanding Achievement in Cinematography in Television Movies, Miniseries or Pilots	"Who is Jane Doe"; Blindspot	Nominated	
2020	72nd Primetime Creative Arts Emmy Awards	Outstanding Cinematography for a Limited Series or Movie	"Part 1"; The Plot Against America	Nominated	
2021	35th American Society of Cinematographers Awards	Outstanding Achievement in Cinematography in Motion Picture, Miniseries, or Pilot Made for Television	"Part 6"; The Plot Against America	Nominated	
2024	76th Primetime Creative Arts Emmy Awards	Outstanding Cinematography for a Series (One Hour)	"Judgment Day"; 3 Body Problem	Nominated	
