= Katelin Arizmendi =

American cinematographer

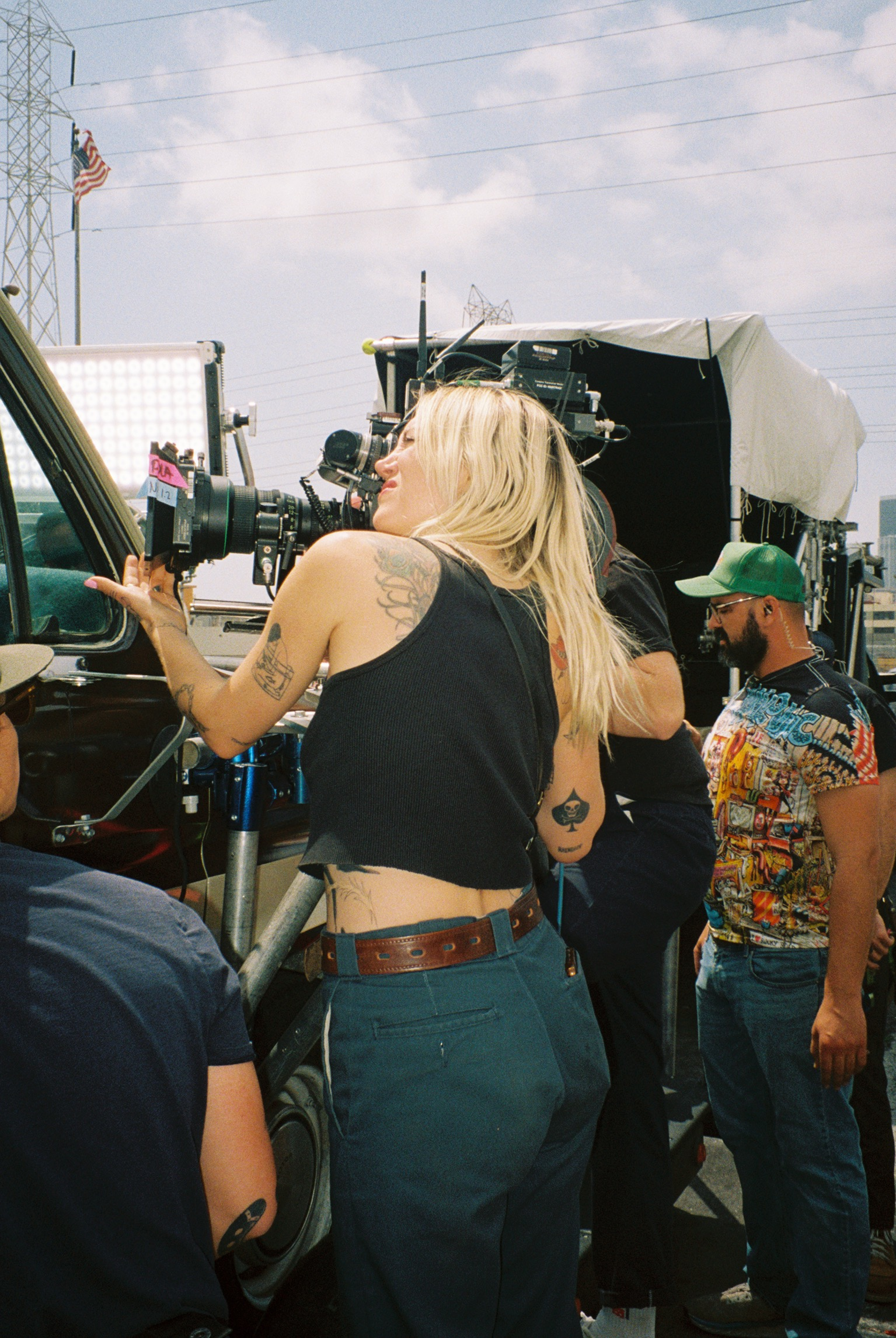
- Born: Oakland, California, U.S.
- Occupation: Cinematographer
- Years active: 2010–present
- Partner: Rory Culkin (2023–present)
- Children: 1

Katelin Arizmendi is an American cinematographer. She is best known for her work on Cam, Swallow, Charm City Kings, Dune, Monica and Succession.

== Life and career ==
Katelin was born in Oakland, California. She did her undergraduate studies in film at the University of California, Santa Cruz. She has worked on music videos for Thirty Seconds to Mars, Sam Fender, Black Rebel Motorcycle Club, Halsey, Doja Cat, Leonard Cohen, Lil Dicky, and more.

Katelin's first feature film as a cinematographer was Cam, released in 2018. Her second film Swallow, premiered at Camerimage festival for cinematographers debut. She also worked as a second unit director of photography for the film Dune. In 2023, she served as co-cinematographer on the television series Succession. In 2024, Arizmendi was invited to join the American Society of Cinematographers (ASC).

Arizmendi entered a relationship with actor Rory Culkin in 2023. They welcomed their first child, a daughter, on May 23, 2026.

== Selected filmography ==
=== Film and television ===
- 2018: Cam
- 2019: Swallow
- 2020: Charm City Kings
- 2021: Dune (2nd unit DP)
- 2022: Monica
- 2023: National Anthem
- 2023: Succession (TV series, 4 episodes)
- 2026: Your Mother Your Mother Your Mother

=== Music video ===
- 2014: Interpol: "My Desire"
- 2015: Petite Meller: "Baby Love"
- 2016: Halsey: "Generation Why"
- 2016: Machine Gun Kelly: "Bad Things"
- 2018: Owlle: "In the Dark"
- 2023: Benjamin Earl Turner: "Headspace/Bent"
- 2023: Doja Cat: "Agora Hills"

== Awards and nominations ==
Year	Result	Award	Category	Work	Ref.
2024	Nominated	Independent Spirit Awards	Best Cinematography	Monica	
2021	Nominated	American Society of Cinematographers	Spotlight Award	Swallow	
2021	Nominated	Chlotrudis Awards	Best Cinematography	Swallow	
2019	Nominated	Camerimage	Best Cinematography Debut	Swallow	
