= 2020 American Society of Cinematographers Awards =

2021 ceremony awarding excellence in cinematography

35th ASC Awards
- Date: April 18, 2021
- Site: ASC Clubhouse, Hollywood
- Hosted by: Ben Mankiewicz

The 35th American Society of Cinematographers Awards were held virtually on April 18, 2021, from the ASC Clubhouse in Hollywood, to honor the best cinematographers of film and television in 2020.

The nominees were announced on March 10, 2021.

== Winners and nominees ==
Winners are listed first and in bold.

=== Film ===
Theatrical Feature Film	Spotlight Award
**Erik Messerschmidt, ASC – Mank**; Phedon Papamichael, ASC, GSC – The Trial of the Chicago 7; Joshua James Richards – Nomadland; Newton Thomas Sigel, ASC – Cherry; Dariusz Wolski, ASC – News of the World	**Aurélien Marra – Two of Us**; Katelin Arizmendi – Swallow; Andrey Naydenov – Dear Comrades!
Documentary Award
**Michael Dweck and Gregory Kershaw – The Truffle Hunters**; Viktor Kossakovsky and Egil Håskjold Larsen – Gunda; Gianfranco Rosi – Notturno

=== Television ===
Episode of a One-Hour Television Series – Non-Commercial	Episode of a One-Hour Television Series – Commercial
**Fabian Wagner, ASC, BSC – The Crown (Episode: "Imbroglio") (Netflix)**; David Franco – Perry Mason (Episode: "Chapter 2") (HBO); Ken Glassing – Lucifer (Episode: "It Never Ends Well for the Chicken") (Netflix); Adriano Goldman, ASC, ABC, BSC – The Crown (Episode: "Fairytale") (Netflix); David Greene, ASC, CSC – Impulse (Episode: "The Moroi") (YouTube Premium); M. David Mullen, ASC – The Marvelous Mrs. Maisel (Episode: "It's Comedy or Cabbage") (Prime Video)	**Jon Joffin, ASC – Motherland: Fort Salem (Episode: "Up is Down") (Freeform)**; Marshall Adams, ASC – Better Call Saul (Episode: "Bagman") (AMC); Carlos Catalán – Killing Eve (Episode: "Meetings Have Biscuits") (BBC America); François Dagenais, CSC – Project Blue Book (Episode: "Area 51") (History); C. Kim Miles, ASC, CSC, MySC – Project Blue Book (Episode: "Operation Mainbrace") (History)
Motion Picture, Limited Series, or Pilot Made for Television	Episode of a Half-Hour Television Series
**Steven Meizler – The Queen's Gambit (Episode: "End Game") (Netflix)**; Martin Ahlgren, ASC – The Plot Against America (Episode: "Part 6") (HBO); Anette Haellmigk – The Great (Episode: "The Great") (Hulu); Pete Konczal – Fargo (Episode: "The Birthplace of Civilization") (FX); Gregory Middleton, ASC, CSC – Watchmen (Episode: "This Extraordinary Being") (HBO)	**Baz Idoine – The Mandalorian (Episode: "Chapter 13: The Jedi") (Disney+)**; Ava Berkofsky – Insecure (Episode: "Lowkey Lost") (HBO); Greig Fraser, ASC, ACS – The Mandalorian (Episode: "Chapter 1: The Mandalorian") (Disney+); Matthew Jensen, ASC – The Mandalorian (Episode: "Chapter 15: The Believer") (Disney+); Jas Shelton – Homecoming (Episode: "Giant") (Prime Video)

=== Board of Governors Award ===
Sofia Coppola
