= Jon Joffin =

South African cinematographer

- Born: 13 June 1963 (age 63); Johannesburg
- Citizenship: South Africa, Canada
- Occupation: Cinematographer

Jon Joffin (born June 13, 1963) is a South African film and television cinematographer, who has worked in both the Canadian and American film and television industries.

Born in Johannesburg, he moved with his family to Canada in childhood.

== Awards ==
Award	Year	Category	Work	Result	Ref(s)
Gemini Awards	2009	Best Photography in a Dramatic Program or Series	Crusoe: "Rum & Gunpowder"	Nominated	
Genie Awards	2012	Best Cinematography	Daydream Nation	Nominated	
Canadian Screen Awards	2014	Best Photography in a Drama Program or Series	Ring of Fire	Nominated	
American Society of Cinematographers	2009	Outstanding Achievement in Cinematography in Motion Picture, Limited Series, or Pilot Made for Television	The Andromeda Strain	Nominated	
American Society of Cinematographers	2011	Outstanding Achievement in Cinematography in Motion Picture, Limited Series, or Pilot Made for Television	Alice	Nominated	
American Society of Cinematographers	2019	Outstanding Achievement in Cinematography in Regular Series	Beyond: "Two Zero One"	Won	
American Society of Cinematographers	2021	Outstanding Achievement in Cinematography in Regular Series	Motherland: Fort Salem: "Up Is Down"	Won	
American Society of Cinematographers	2022	Outstanding Achievement in Cinematography in Regular Series	Titans: "Souls"	Won	
Canadian Society of Cinematographers	2019	Best Cinematography in a TV Series	Beyond: "Two Zero One"	Nominated	
Canadian Society of Cinematographers	2021	Best Cinematography in TV Drama - Commercial	Motherland: Fort Salem	Won	
Canadian Society of Cinematographers	2022	Best Cinematography in TV Comedy	Julie and the Phantoms	Won	
Leo Awards	2010	Best Cinematography in a Feature Length Drama	Alice	Won	
Leo Awards	2012	Best Cinematography in a Feature Length Drama	Daydream Nation	Won	
Leo Awards	2016	Best Cinematography in a Television Movie	Love on the Air	Nominated	
Primetime Emmy Awards	2008	Outstanding Cinematography for a Limited or Anthology Series or Movie	The Andromeda Strain: "Part One"	Nominated	
Primetime Emmy Awards	2023	Outstanding Cinematography for a Series (Half-Hour)	Schmigadoon!: "Something Real"	Nominated	
