= 2010 American Society of Cinematographers Awards =

Annual US film and television awards

25th ASC Awards
- Date: February 13, 2011

Highlights
- Cinematography in Film: Inception

The 25th American Society of Cinematographers Awards were held on February 13, 2011, honoring the best cinematographers of film and television in 2010.

== Winners and nominees ==
=== Film ===
- Wally Pfister – Inception
  - Danny Cohen – The King's Speech
  - Jeff Cronenweth – The Social Network
  - Roger Deakins – True Grit
  - Matthew Libatique – Black Swan

=== Television ===
==== Outstanding Achievement in Cinematography in Regular Series or Pilot ====
- Jonathan Freeman – Boardwalk Empire (Episode: "Home")
  - Eagle Egilsson – Dark Blue (Episode: "Shell Game")
  - Chris Manley – Mad Men (Episode: "Blowing Smoke")
  - Kramer Morgenthau – Boardwalk Empire (Episode: "Family Limitation")
  - David Stockton – Nikita (Episode: "Pilot")
  - Michael Wale – Smallville (Episode: "Shield")
  - Glen Winter – Smallville (Episode: "Abandoned")

==== Outstanding Achievement in Cinematography in Television Movies or Miniseries ====
- Stephen F. Windon – The Pacific (Episode: "Okinawa")
  - David Gribble – Jesse Stone: No Remorse
  - Jon Joffin – Alice (Episode: "Episode 2")
