= 2001 American Society of Cinematographers Awards =

Annual US film/tv awards ceremony

16th ASC Awards
- Date: February 17, 2002

Highlights
- Cinematography in Theatrical Releases: The Man Who Wasn't There

The 16th American Society of Cinematographers Awards were held on February 17, 2002, honoring the best cinematographers of film and television in 2001.

== Winners and nominees ==
=== Outstanding Achievement in Cinematography in Theatrical Release ===
- The Man Who Wasn't There – Roger Deakins
- Amélie – Bruno Delbonnel
- The Lord of the Rings: The Fellowship of the Ring – Andrew Lesnie
- Moulin Rouge! – Don McAlpine
- Pearl Harbor – John Schwartzman

=== Outstanding Achievement in Cinematography in Regular Series ===
- The West Wing (Episode: "Bartlet for America") – Thomas Del Ruth
- Alias (Episode: "Time Will Tell") – Michael Bonvillain
- Ally McBeal (Episode: "The Wedding") – Billy Dickson
- CSI: Crime Scene Investigation (Episode: "Alter Boys") – Michael Barrett
- The X-Files (Episode: "This Is Not Happening") – Bill Roe

=== Outstanding Achievement in Cinematography in Movie of the Week or Pilot for Basic or Pay TV ===
- Attila – Steven Fierberg
- Boss of Bosses – Brian J. Reynolds
- Just Ask My Children – Lowell Peterson
- Prancer Retuens – Bruce Worrall
- What Girls Learn – Malcolm Cross

=== Outstanding Achievement in Cinematography in Movie of the Week or Pilot for a Network ===
- Uprising – Denis Lenoir
- 24 – Peter Levy
- Citizen Baines – Ernest Holzman
- Don Giovanni Unmasked – Rene Ohashi
- Smallville – Peter Wunstorf

=== International Award ===
- Douglas Slocombe

=== ASC Presidents Award ===
- Garrett Brown

=== Board of Governors Award ===
- Stanley Donen

=== Lifetime Achievement Award ===
- László Kovács
