= 2006 American Society of Cinematographers Awards =

Annual US film/tv awards ceremony

21st ASC Awards
- Date: February 18, 2007

Highlights
- Cinematography in Theatrical Releases: Children of Men

The 21st American Society of Cinematographers Awards were held on February 18, 2007, honoring the best cinematographers of film and television in 2006.

== Winners and nominees ==
=== Film ===
Outstanding Achievement in Cinematography in Theatrical Releases

- Emmanuel Lubezki – Children of Men
  - Dick Pope – The Illusionist
  - Robert Richardson – The Good Shepherd
  - Dean Semler – Apocalypto
  - Vilmos Zsigmond – The Black Dahlia

=== Television ===
==== Outstanding Achievement in Cinematography in Regular Series ====
- David Moxness – Smallville (Episode: "Arrow")
  - Eagle Egilsson – CSI: Miami (Episode: "Darkroom")
  - Nathan Hope – CSI: Crime Scene Investigation (Episode: "Killer")
  - Bill Roe – Day Break (Episode: "What If They Find Him")
  - Gale Tattersall – House (Episode: "Meaning")

==== Outstanding Achievement in Cinematography in Television Movie, Miniseries, or Pilot ====
- John Stokes – Nightmares & Dreamscapes: From the Stories of Stephen King (Episode: "Umney's Last Case")
  - Thomas Del Ruth – Studio 60 on the Sunset Strip (Episode: "Pilot")
  - Adam Kane – Heroes (Episode: "Genesis")
  - Walt Lloyd – The Librarian: Return to King Solomon's Mines
  - Bill Roe – Day Break (Episode: "Pilot")
