= 2007 American Society of Cinematographers Awards =

Annual US film/tv awards ceremony

22nd ASC Awards
- Date: January 26, 2008

Highlights
- Cinematography in Theatrical Releases: There Will Be Blood

The 22nd American Society of Cinematographers Awards were held on January 26, 2008, honoring the best cinematographers of film and television in 2007.

== Winners and nominees ==
=== Film ===
Outstanding Achievement in Cinematography in Theatrical Release

- There Will Be Blood – Robert Elswit
  - The Assassination of Jesse James by the Coward Robert Ford – Roger Deakins
  - Atonement – Seamus McGarvey
  - The Diving Bell and the Butterfly (Le scaphandre et le papillon) – Janusz Kamiński
  - No Country for Old Men – Roger Deakins

=== Television ===
Outstanding Achievement in Cinematography in Miniseries, Pilot, or Movies of the Week

- The Company – Ben Nott
  - Bury My Heart at Wounded Knee – David Franco
  - Jesse Stone: Sea Change – Rene Ohashi
  - Pushing Daisies – Michael Weaver (Episode: "Pie-lette")
  - Raines – Oliver Bokelberg (Episode: "Pilot")

Outstanding Achievement in Cinematography in Episodic TV Series

- Smallville – Glen Winter (Episode: "Noir")
  - The Black Donnellys – Russell Lee Fine (Episode: "All of Us Are in the Gutter")
  - CSI: Crime Scene Investigation – James L. Carter (Episode: "Ending Happy")
  - CSI: Miami – Eagle Egilsson (Episode: "Inside Out")
  - Women's Murder Club – John Fleckenstein (Episode: "Welcome to the Club")
