= Grotesque (The X-Files) =

- The X-Files episode
- Episode no.: Season 3 Episode 14
- Directed by: Kim Manners
- Written by: Howard Gordon
- Production code: 3X14
- Original air date: February 2, 1996
- Running time: 44 minutes

Guest appearances
- Mitch Pileggi as Walter Skinner; Levani Outchaneichvili as John Mostow; Greg Thirloway as Agent Nemhauser; Kurtwood Smith as Bill Patterson; Zoran Vukelic as The Model

Episode chronology
← Previous "Syzygy"	Next → "Piper Maru"
- The X-Files season 3

"Grotesque" is the fourteenth episode of the third season of the science fiction television series The X-Files and the show's 63rd episode overall. It premiered on the Fox network in the United States on February 2, 1996. It was written by Howard Gordon and directed by Kim Manners. The episode is a "Monster-of-the-Week" story, unconnected to the series' wider mythology. "Grotesque" earned a Nielsen household rating of 11.6, being watched by 18.32 million people in its initial broadcast. The episode received mostly positive reviews from television critics.

The show centers on FBI Special Agents Fox Mulder (David Duchovny) and Dana Scully (Gillian Anderson) who work on cases linked to the paranormal, called X-Files. Mulder is a conspiracy theorist and a believer in the paranormal, while the skeptical Scully, a medical doctor, has been assigned to debunk his work. In this episode, Mulder and Scully work with Mulder's former mentor and the FBI's chief profiler, Special Agent Bill Patterson, to investigate a serial killer who claims a gargoyle spirit possessed him and committed the crimes. When Mulder joins the case, his obsession with solving it causes Scully to question his sanity.

Gordon was inspired to write the episode after walking down the streets of New York and seeing several stone gargoyles on the corner, staring at him. Gordon developed the concept with series creator Chris Carter, who suggested the addition of more psychological aspects to the episode. Originally, the teaser was planned to be filmed at a Catholic hospital, but the shot was relocated to the site of a historic post office after concerns were raised about attaching a fake gargoyle to the building.

== Plot ==
At George Washington University, a group of artists sketch a nude male model. However, one of the artists, John Mostow (Levani Outchaneichvili), draws a demonic creature in the model's place. While using a utility knife to sharpen his pencil, he cuts his hand and smears his blood on the drawing. When the model reaches his car after the session, he is attacked and killed by an obscured assailant. The following morning, Mostow is arrested in his apartment by an FBI task force led by Special Agent Bill Patterson (Kurtwood Smith), who finds the utility knife used in the murder covered in blood.

Mostow, an immigrant from Uzbekistan with a history of involuntary commitment, is charged with killing seven men by mutilating their faces. Special Agents Fox Mulder (David Duchovny) and Dana Scully (Gillian Anderson) become involved in the investigation when Mostow insists that he was possessed during the killings; his claims are given credence when another murder occurs after his arrest. Mostow draws a gargoyle and claims it made him kill. The agents meet with Patterson, who has spent three years working the case. Mulder knows Patterson from his time in the Investigative Support Unit at Quantico. Their relationship is tense, and Patterson is skeptical of Mulder's theories. Mulder and Scully go to Mostow's studio and discover a hidden room full of gargoyle sculptures, finding corpses within them.

A glassblower is attacked and hospitalized. Special Agent Nemhauser (Greg Thirloway), Patterson's partner, tells Scully that Patterson was responsible for getting Mulder assigned to the investigation and may admire him after all. Patterson finds Mulder in the library studying gargoyles and expresses disappointment in him. Scully goes to Mulder's apartment and finds it covered with gargoyle drawings. Mulder, having sculpted a gargoyle himself in Mostow's studio before falling asleep, awakens to find a figure with a gargoyle-like face standing over him; he gives chase but is attacked, his face slashed with a utility knife. Mulder refuses to explain to Scully why he was in the studio. Scully confronts Patterson, who tells her not to try and stop Mulder from doing what he's doing. Mulder again goes to see Mostow, who refuses to divulge how to find the creature that attacked him.

Scully finds a disassembled utility knife at the latest crime scene with Mulder's prints on it and discovers that the murder weapon is missing from the evidence room. She meets with Assistant Director Walter Skinner (Mitch Pileggi), who is also worried about Mulder's behavior. Mulder has a nightmare about being attacked by a gargoyle that is really himself. He goes to Mostow's studio again, finding a severed arm. Scully gets a message to call Nemhauser, but his phone is answered by Mulder, who denies taking the knife. He searches Mostow's studio and finds Nemhauser's body inside a new sculpture. Mulder is then confronted by Patterson, who is unaware of how he arrived at the studio. Mulder then deduces that Patterson is the killer, based on his three-year obsession with Mostow and his request for Mulder to investigate the case. Mulder confronts him, but Patterson flees when Scully arrives. Mulder pursues him and they fight, but Mulder perceives Patterson as a demonic gargoyle creature. Patterson is shot and apprehended.

In the last scene, Patterson is pressed against the bars of his cell, screaming and pleading that he is innocent, while the camera focuses on a gargoyle drawn in blood on the wall of his cell. Earlier in the episode, Mulder told Scully that he and Patterson disagreed on the best way to investigate serial murders: Patterson always tried to empathize with the suspect, imagining himself in the killer's place. Mulder's closing narration concludes that it was this that eventually drove Patterson insane, but Mulder cannot account for what he saw while fighting Patterson.

== Production ==
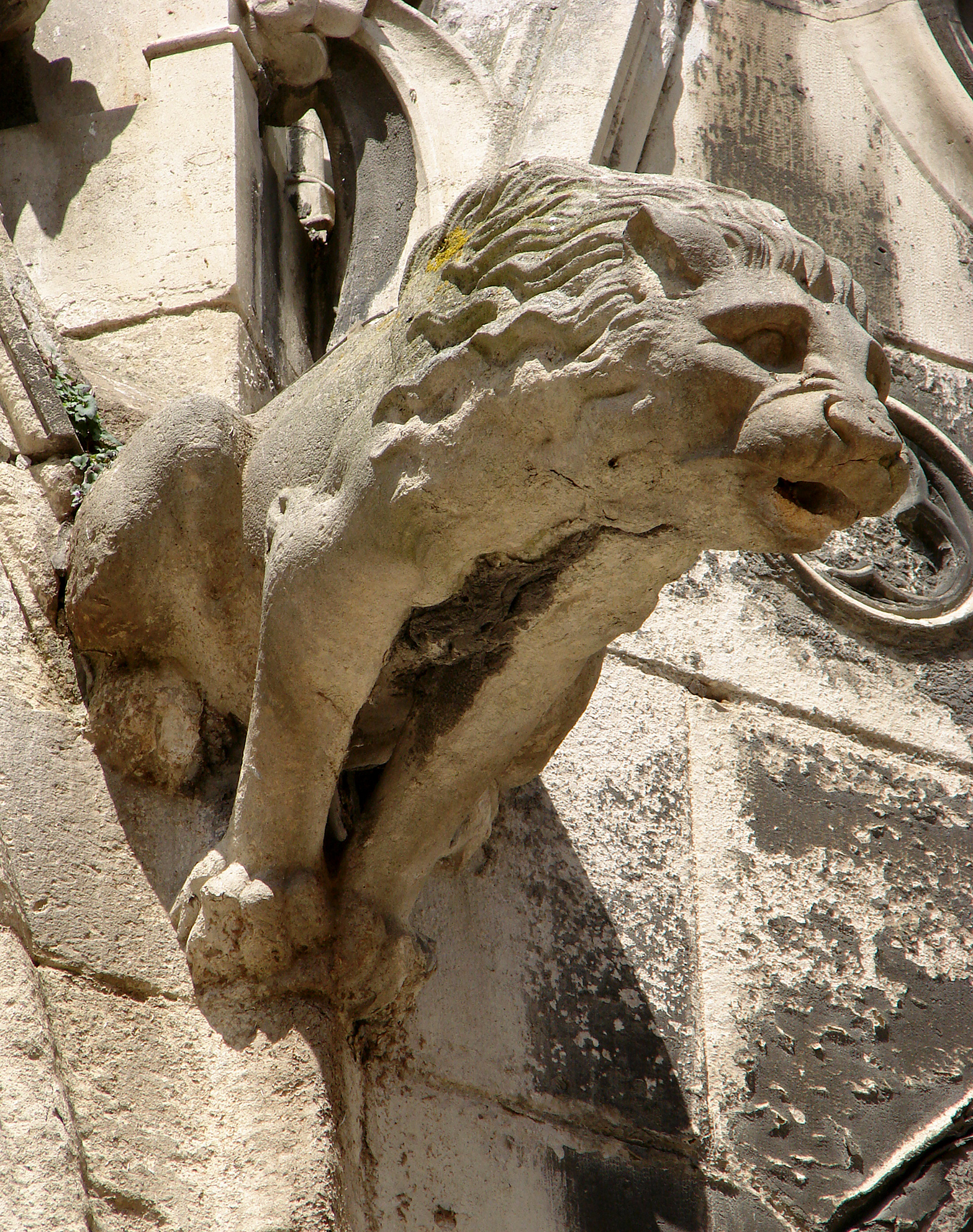
Howard Gordon was inspired to write the script for the episode after seeing a stone gargoyle.

"Grotesque" was written by Howard Gordon, who conceived of the main story after he noticed stone gargoyles on a corner of a New York street he was walking down. The eeriness of the occurrence led Gordon to develop a tale involving possession by a gargoyle spirit. He wrote a draft script for the episode, but the weekend before production began, he had to completely rework it with the help of series creator Chris Carter. During those few days, the two overhauled the script to add more psychological aspects to the episode. Gordon was "very proud" of the final product.

The producers originally planned to film the opening scene at a Catholic hospital, but the hospital they were interested in using did not want to affix a faux gargoyle to the building. Thus, the shot was relocated to Heritage Hall, a building that had been both a post office and a Royal Canadian Mounted Police office in the past. At the last minute before filming, city workers began tearing up a sidewalk on the very spot where the producers planned to film the scene; this caused a panic among the producers, but the construction crew assured the show that the construction would be completed before the show's scheduled shooting time, which it indeed was—with only two hours to spare. Additional exterior shots were filmed at an alley near Bonanza Meat Market, the walls of which were painted to match those of Heritage Hall.

The episode was directed by Kim Manners, who cited it as his favorite third-season episode and praised David Duchovny's performance in this episode, saying "Duchovny drove himself, and he was brilliant in that show." Manners also said of the episode: "I think 'Grotesque' is a frightening show. I think it is a disturbing show, and I think that's why—for me—it's such a good show. We pulled it off making the viewer feel uneasy. I even found it a difficult show to watch. Yeah, it was a pretty dark hour of television and I would like to do more of those." To get inspiration, Manners played the soundtrack to the film Jacob's Ladder (1990) on repeat until his wife "finally asked, 'Do we have to listen to that (bleeping) CD again?'" Manners also theorized that this episode may have inspired Carter when he eventually developed the show Millennium, which premiered on Fox the following television season.

== Reception ==
=== Ratings ===
"Grotesque" premiered on the Fox network in the United States on February 2, 1996. This episode earned a Nielsen rating of 11.6, with an 18 share, meaning that roughly 11.6 percent of all television-equipped households, and 18 percent of households watching television, were tuned in to the episode. This totaled 18.32 million viewers. The episode had the third highest ratings of the third season.

=== Reviews ===
"Grotesque" received mostly positive reviews from critics. Reviewer Emily VanDerWerff of The A.V. Club gave the episode an A− and noted that while the episode is "ponderous and pretentious", this aspect of the entry turns it into "a benefit". VanDerWerff wrote, "here's the thing: 'Grotesque' is absolutely [...] self-serious, just as much as I feared it would be. It also, unquestionably, works. The reason it works is very simple: It's pretty scary". Critical Myth's John Keegan gave the episode a largely positive review, awarding it an 8 out of 10. He noted, "Overall, this is a solid effort by Howard Gordon. It’s good to see some of the methods that earned Mulder his nickname, and the underlying dynamic between Mulder and Scully is very well played. The central premise is vague enough to fall within the confines of the unusual, if not necessarily paranormal, and the supporting cinematography and score rise to the occasion." Robert Shearman, in his book Wanting to Believe: A Critical Guide to The X-Files, Millennium & The Lone Gunmen, rated the episode five stars out of five and praised the themes of the episode, writing that, "Because 'Grotesque' certainly surprises, and shocks, and even appals —this is the closest The X-Files ever gets to staring into the face of insanity." Furthermore, Shearman praised Duchovny's acting, calling it "his best performance yet seen in the series". Paula Vitaris from Cinefantastique gave the episode a positive review and awarded it three-and-a-half stars out of four. She referred to the episode as "one of [the show's] darkest ever" and called it "a triumph for director Manners, cinematographer Bartley, and The X-Files art department." Vitaris, however, was critical of the episode's closing monologue, noting that "[Mulder] spells out what the camera is saying a hundred times more effectively with its finale shot of a pairing of a gargoyle." Jonathan Dunn, writing for What Culture, described "Grotesque" as a "deep, dark, twisted psychological moment for The X-Files that I absolutely love" and included it in the "5 Episodes [of The X-Files] That Could Be Made Into Movies" list.

Not all reviews were positive. Author Phil Farrand was critical of the episode, rating it his fourth least favorite episode of the first four seasons in his book The Nitpickers Guide to the X-Files. Entertainment Weekly gave "Grotesque" a D, labeling it as "ponderous, oblique, and featuring one of Mulder's always annoying, easy-way-out soliloquy summations".

=== Awards ===
"Grotesque" earned an Emmy Award from the Academy of Television Arts & Sciences for Outstanding Cinematography - Series.

== Bibliography ==
- Edwards, Ted (1996). X-Files Confidential. Little, Brown and Company. ISBN 0-316-21808-1.
- Farrand, Phil (1998). The Nitpickers Guide to the X-Files. Doubleday Direct. ISBN 1-56865-503-7.
- Gradnitzer, Louisa; Pittson, Todd (1999). X Marks the Spot: On Location with The X-Files. Arsenal Pulp Press. ISBN 1-55152-066-4.
- Lowry, Brian (1996). Trust No One: The Official Guide to the X-Files. Harper Prism. ISBN 0-06-105353-8.
- Shearman, Robert (2009). Wanting to Believe: A Critical Guide to The X-Files, Millennium & The Lone Gunmen. Mad Norwegian Press. ISBN 978-0-9759446-9-1.
