= Chapelwaite =

American horror television series

- Genre: Horror drama
- Based on: "Jerusalem's Lot" by Stephen King
- Written by: Jason Filardi; Peter Filardi
- Starring: Adrien Brody; Emily Hampshire; Jennifer Ens; Sirena Gulamgaus; Ian Ho; Christopher Heyerdahl
- Country of origin: United States
- Original language: English
- No. of seasons: 1
- No. of episodes: 10

Production
- Executive producers: Donald De Line; Jason Filardi; Peter Filardi
- Production locations: Nova Scotia; Maritime Canada
- Running time: 46–60 minutes
- Production companies: De Line Pictures; Epix Studios

Original release
- Network: Epix
- Release: August 22 – October 31, 2021

Chapelwaite is an American horror television series loosely based on the short story “Jerusalem's Lot” by author Stephen King. It was written by Peter and Jason Filardi, and premiered on Epix on August 22, 2021, and concluded on October 31, 2021. In February 2022, the series was renewed for a second season. In November 2023, it was announced that MGM+ had decided not to move forward with a second season.

== Premise ==
In 1850, following his wife's tragic death at sea aboard a whaler ship, Captain Charles Boone (Adrien Brody) and his children return to the small town of Preacher's Corners, Maine, where a dark family history haunts them until confronted.

== Cast and characters ==
- Adrien Brody as Captain Charles Boone
- Emily Hampshire as Rebecca Morgan
- Jennifer Ens as Honor Boone
- Sirena Gulamgaus as Loa Boone
- Ian Ho as Tane Boone
- Eric Peterson as Samuel Gallup
- Christopher Heyerdahl as Jakub
- Julian Richings as Phillip Boone
- Steven McCarthy as Stephen Boone
- Gord Rand as Minister Burroughs
- Trina Corkum as Mary Dennison

== Episodes ==
No.	Title	Directed by	Teleplay by	Original release date
1	"Blood Calls Blood"	Burr Steers	Jason Filardi & Peter Filardi	August 22, 2021
In 1850, Captain Charles Boone inherits his wealthy cousin's estate and relocates his family to small-town Maine; the Boones encounter prejudice, hostility and murder as Charles begins a dangerous journey of self-discovery.
2	"Memento Mori"	Burr Steers	Jason Filardi & Peter Filardi	August 29, 2021
A child in town dies of a mystery illness and on her deathbed, credits Stephen Boone; hysterical townsfolk demand that Charles dig up his cousin's grave; Charles refuses, but in private opens the grave and is shocked by what he finds.
3	"Legacy of Madness"	Jeff Renfroe	Scott Kosar	September 12, 2021
Charles continues to hear rats behind the walls, despite assurances there are none; his search for answers leads to an insane asylum where his worst fears are realized.
4	"The Promised"	Jeff Renfroe	Declan de Barra	September 19, 2021
Charles prepares to commit himself to the asylum for treatment but Tane discovers something disturbing in the barn that may help reveal Chapelwaite's secrets; a creepy cadre of emaciated Acolytes arrive with a message.
5	"The Prophet"	Rachel Leiterman	Jason Filardi & Peter Filardi	September 26, 2021
The mysterious Jakub lures Charles to Jerusalem's Lot and he discovers that his madness is connected to an ancient book; the children are stunned and betrayed when Loa finds Rebecca's secret writings about the Boone family.
6	"The Offer"	Rachel Leiterman	Scott Kosar	October 3, 2021
Charles is overwhelmed with grief and anger after his family is dealt a devastating blow; Stephen and Uncle Phillip come to Charles with a surprising proposition.
7	"De Vermis Mysteriis"	David Frazee	Declan de Barra	October 10, 2021
Overwhelmed with madness, Charles is driven to the church cemetery where he unearths a hidden book; once in his hands, he has an apocalyptic vision of the vampire future.
8	"Hold the Night"	David Frazee	Jason Filardi & Peter Filardi	October 17, 2021
Charles and his family defend Chapelwaite with the help of Constable Dennison and Minister Burroughs; the night tests each character to their emotional limit.
9	"The Gathering Dark"	Michael Nankin	Scott Kosar	October 24, 2021
Charles and company try to enlist men in town to fight in Jerusalem's Lot and retake the book.
10	"The Keeper"	Michael Nankin	Jason Filardi & Peter Filardi	October 31, 2021
Jakub and his army come out of the dark and attack Charles and his fighters; Charles must make a decision to free his family of the ancient book's curse.

== Production ==
=== Development ===
In December 2019, it was reported that Epix had given a 10-episode straight-to-series order for an adaptation of "Jerusalem's Lot", with Jason Filardi and Peter Filardi set to write, and Donald De Line producing under De Line Productions. In February 2022, Epix renewed the show for a second season. In November 2023, it was announced that MGM+ had decided not to move forward with the second season.

=== Casting ===
In December 2019, Adrien Brody was cast in the leading role of Captain Charles Boone. In March 2020, Emily Hampshire joined the cast, set to play Rebecca Morgan.

=== Filming ===
Chapelwaite was set to begin production in April 2020, in Halifax, Nova Scotia, but it had to be postponed due to the COVID-19 pandemic. Filming began in Halifax on July 5, 2020.

== Release ==
Chapelwaite premiered August 22, 2021, on Epix in the United States and CTV Sci-Fi Channel in Canada. In India, it is streaming on SonyLIV. In the UK, it is available on Paramount+.

== Reception ==
On the review aggregator website Rotten Tomatoes, 60% of 20 critics' reviews are positive, with an average rating of 6.20/10. The website's consensus reads, "Chapelwaite's drab proceedings are stretched a bit thin over ten episodes, but those looking for an atmospheric whodunit with a few genuine frights could do worse".
