= 2009 American Society of Cinematographers Awards =

Annual US film and television awards

24th ASC Awards
- Date: February 27, 2010

Highlights
- Cinematography in Film: The White Ribbon

The 24th American Society of Cinematographers Awards were held on February 27, 2010, honoring the best cinematographers of film and television in 2009.

== Winners and nominees ==
=== Film ===
- ' Christian Berger – The White Ribbon
  - Barry Ackroyd – The Hurt Locker
  - Dion Beebe – Nine
  - Mauro Fiore – Avatar
  - Robert Richardson – Inglourious Basterds

=== Television ===
==== Outstanding Achievement in Cinematography in Regular Series or Pilot ====
- Eagle Egilsson – Dark Blue (Episode: "Venice Kings")
  - Jeffrey Jur, ASC – FlashForward (Episode: "The Gift")
  - Michael Price – Ugly Betty (Episode: "There's No Place Like Mode")
  - Christian Sebaldt, ASC – CSI: Crime Scene Investigation (Episode: "Family Affair")
  - Glen Winter, CSC – Smallville (Episode: "Savior")

==== Outstanding Achievement in Cinematography in Miniseries or Television Movie ====
- Alar Kivilo, ASC, CSC – Taking Chance
  - Rene Ohashi, ASC, CSC – Jesse Stone: Thin Ice
  - Jerzy Zieliński, ASC – The Courageous Heart of Irena Sendler
