= Patience (The X-Files) =

- The X-Files episode
- The man bat. The creature and episode were roundly criticized, with one reviewer calling the antagonist "a dull monster in fake-looking make-up".
- Episode no.: Season 8 Episode 3
- Directed by: Chris Carter
- Written by: Chris Carter
- Production code: 8ABX04
- Original air date: November 19, 2000
- Running time: 44 minutes

Guest appearances
- Eve Brenner as Mrs. McKesson; Gary Bullock as Tall George; Jay Caputo as Bat Creature; Eugene Dynarski as Ernie Stefaniuk; Bradford English as Yale Abbott; Dan Leegant as Myron Stefaniuk; Annie O'Donnell as Tahoma; Bryan Rasmussen as Sheriff's Deputy; Brent Sexton as Gravedigger

Episode chronology
← Previous "Without"	Next → "Roadrunners"
- The X-Files season 8

"Patience" is the third episode of the eighth season of the American science fiction television series The X-Files. It premiered on the Fox network on November 19, 2000. The episode was written and directed by series creator Chris Carter. "Patience" is a "Monster-of-the-Week" story, unconnected to the series' wider mythology. The episode received a Nielsen rating of 8.2 and was viewed by 13.3 million viewers. The episode received mixed to negative reviews from critics.

The series centers on FBI special agents Dana Scully (Gillian Anderson) and her new partner John Doggett (Robert Patrick)—following the alien abduction of her former partner, Fox Mulder (David Duchovny)—who work on cases linked to the paranormal, called X-Files. In this episode, John Doggett, after having been assigned to the X-Files, joins Scully to investigate a series of gruesome murders that appear to be the work of a bat-like creature. This being their first case together, Scully and Doggett find that their investigative techniques are less than similar.

Carter was inspired to write "Patience" to emulate the "back-to-basics stand alones […] of the earlier seasons". The episode was the first The X-Files entry to neither feature actor David Duchovny nor feature his name in the opening credits. Furthermore, the episode was crafted to be the first to test Doggett's skepticism of paranormal activity.

== Plot ==
In Burley, Idaho, an undertaker and his wife are brutally murdered by a flying creature. Dana Scully (Gillian Anderson) and John Doggett (Robert Patrick) investigate and find that the victims died from blood loss caused by apparently human bite marks. At the crime scene, Detective Yale Abbott (Bradford English) suggests that animals fed on the bodies, but Scully points out a single human-like footprint. Following prints into the attic, the agents find the undertaker's missing fingers, apparently regurgitated, and claw marks suggesting something hung from the rafters. Meanwhile, elderly Mrs. McKesson is killed in her attic.

Scully discovers that the bites differ from human bites and that saliva on the fingers contains anti-coagulants found in bats. Doggett produces a newspaper article describing similar deaths in 1956, when hunters shot and presumably killed a man-bat creature in Montana. However, the coroner who examined the creature was later killed, after which a number of other people mysteriously died. Investigating Mrs. McKesson's death, Scully finds a connection to her daughter, Ariel, whose burned body was recovered in a river in 1956. When Ariel's coffin is exhumed, someone has already dug it up and scratched its lid. Meanwhile, Abbott investigates nearby and is killed by the creature.

Scully realizes that the victims all came into contact with Ariel's body: Abbott investigated her death, her mother identified her, the undertaker prepared her body, and a man named Myron Stefaniuk pulled it from the river. Only Myron remains alive. He leads the agents to his brother Ernie Stefaniuk, who was Ariel's husband; he was also one of the men who had killed the man-bat creature in 1956. Ernie suggests that the monster killing people is the same creature that he had shot in 1956 and that it is seeking revenge. The creature kills anyone carrying Ernie's scent, and when Ariel had died, Ernie burned her body and dumped it in the water to conceal his scent; this did not appear to fully cover up the scent, however, hence the murders.

Believing that Myron is in danger, Doggett goes to find him, only to be badly injured by the creature. Meanwhile, Ernie warns Scully that she is now marked as well. Suddenly, the creature attacks and kills Ernie, but Scully manages to shoot it before it can attack her. The injured Doggett then arrives and shoots the monster several more times, driving it into the night. Later, the agents receive a fax from Myron, revealing that he has survived and has gone into hiding in Wyoming.

== Production ==
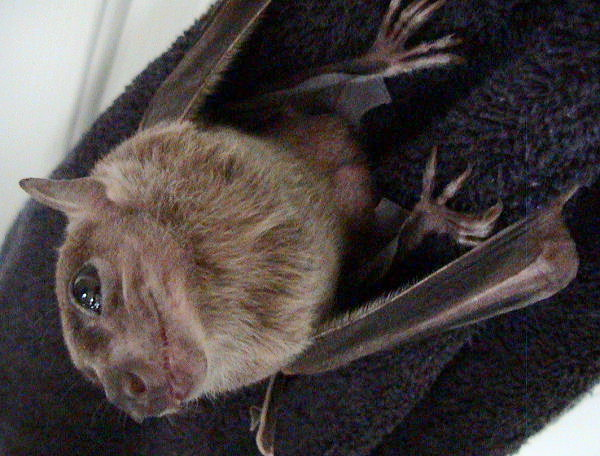
Live Egyptian Fruit Bats were used in the episode.

"Patience" was written and directed by series creator Chris Carter. The episode, inspired by the "back-to-basics stand alones […] of the earlier seasons", features a human-bat hybrid as the main villain; this character was inspired by the 1970s comic book villain, Man-Bat, one of the arch-nemeses of Batman. During the filming of the episode, live Egyptian fruit bat were used.

"Patience" was the first to test Doggett's skepticism of paranormal activity. As Robert Patrick explained, "['Patience'] is where it starts to toy with my willingness to believe in the paranormal and strange happenings. You've got a guy that's a bat, which is sort of out of the norm." The episode was also the first episode of The X-Files to neither feature actor David Duchovny nor feature his name in the opening credits. After settling his contract dispute with Fox, Duchovny quit full-time participation in the show after the seventh season. (In order to explain Mulder's absence, Duchovny's character was abducted by aliens in the seventh season finale, "Requiem".)

== Reception ==
=== Ratings ===
"Patience" first aired on Fox on November 19, 2000. The episode earned a Nielsen household rating of 8.2, meaning that it was seen by 8.2% of the nation's estimated households. The episode was seen by 13.3 million viewers. The episode ranked as the 42nd most-watched episode for the week ending November 19. The episode subsequently aired in the United Kingdom on the BBC Two on July 28, 2002. Fox promoted the episode with the tagline "More deadly than a man. More ruthless than a bat. A hungry predator waits in the darkness for its next prey... Scully and Doggett."

=== Reviews ===
Jay Anderson, writing for What Culture, was positive toward the episode. While noting the show's return to its "dark, creepy [...] roots" in the eighth season, Anderson described the episode as an "early success at returning to the realm of the scary". Anderson ranked the human bat as the eighth creepiest creature of the show. Robert Shearman, in his book Wanting to Believe: A Critical Guide to The X-Files, Millennium & The Lone Gunmen, rated the episode two-and-a-half stars out of five. The author noted that, despite the fact that "a lot of [the episode] works […] because the scenes between Doggett and Scully are so good", the positive aspects of the episode were not "put to better use in a more exciting episode; this particular case hardly stretched anyone's deductive prowess." Shearman later wrote that if the episode had been "a Mulder and Scully adventure, this would have been bottom of the barrel stuff."

Emily VanDerWerff of The A.V. Club awarded the episode a "C+" and criticized both its monster and its guest cast. Concerning the former, she wrote that it was "just ridiculous" and that its design was "bland and generic". Concerning the latter, she wrote that the cast was filled with "actors hamming it up". VanDerWerff did note that the episode was better "than its reputation" suggested, but that it still was "undone by some very strange story choices and a dumb monster". Paula Vitaris from Cinefantastique gave the episode a negative review and awarded it one-and-a-half stars out of four. Vitaris bluntly wrote, "if you're looking for a suspenseful, bite-your-nails, monster-of-the-week X-Files episode… this isn't it." Furthermore, she criticized the villain, calling it "a dull monster in fake-looking make-up".

=== Awards ===
"Patience" earned a nomination for an ASC Award by the American Society of Cinematographers for Outstanding Achievement in Cinematography – Regular Series.

== See also ==
- Flying primates theory

== Bibliography ==
- Hurwitz, Matt; Knowles, Chris (2008). The Complete X-Files. Insight Editions. ISBN 978-1933784809.
- Shearman, Robert (2009). Wanting to Believe: A Critical Guide to The X-Files, Millennium & The Lone Gunmen. Mad Norwegian Press. ISBN 978-0975944691.

This article incorporates material derived from the "Patience" article on the X-Files wiki at Fandom (formerly Wikia) and is licensed under the Creative Commons Attribution-Share Alike 3.0 License (April 27, 2012).
