= 2014 American Society of Cinematographers Awards =

Annual US film and television awards

29th ASC Awards
- Date: February 15, 2015
- Site: Hollywood & Highland Ray Dolby Ballroom

Highlights
- Cinematography in Theatrical Releases: Birdman

The 29th American Society of Cinematographers Awards were held on February 15, 2015, at the Hollywood & Highland Ray Dolby Ballroom, honoring the best cinematographers of film and television in 2014.

The film nominees were announced on January 7, 2015. Roger Deakins received a record thirteenth nomination for Unbroken. Óscar Faura and Robert Yeoman are first-time nominees, while veterans Emmanuel Lubezki and Dick Pope also received nominations.

== Winners and nominees ==
=== Board of Directors Award ===
- Awarded to actress and singer Barbra Streisand.

=== Film ===
==== Outstanding Achievement in Cinematography in Theatrical Release ====
- Emmanuel Lubezki, ASC, AMC – Birdman
  - Roger Deakins, ASC, BSC – Unbroken
  - Óscar Faura – The Imitation Game
  - Dick Pope, BSC – Mr. Turner
  - Robert Yeoman, ASC – The Grand Budapest Hotel

==== Spotlight Award ====
The Spotlight Award nominees were announced on January 16, 2014. The award "recognize[s] outstanding cinematography in features and documentaries that are typically screened at film festivals, in limited theatrical release, or outside the United States".

- Peter Flinckenberg, FSC – Concrete Night (Betoniyö)
  - Darius Khondji, ASC, AFC – The Immigrant
  - Daniel Landin, BSC – Under the Skin

=== Television ===
The previous "One-Hour" and "Half-Hour" categories have been merged into one:

==== Outstanding Achievement in Cinematography in Episode of a Regular Series ====
- Jonathan Freeman, ASC – Boardwalk Empire (Episode: "Golden Days for Boys and Girls") (HBO)
  - P.J. Dillon – Vikings (Episode: "Blood Eagle") (History)
  - Anette Haellmigk – Game of Thrones (Episode: "The Children") (HBO)
  - Christopher Norr – Gotham (Episode: "Spirit of the Goat") (Fox)
  - Richard Rutkowski – Manhattan (Episode: "Perestroika") (WGN America)
  - Fabian Wagner, BSC – Game of Thrones (Episode: "Mockingbird") (HBO)

==== Outstanding Achievement in Cinematography in Television Movie, Miniseries, or Pilot ====
- John Lindley, ASC – Manhattan (Episode: "You Always Hurt the One You Love") (WGN America)
  - David Greene, CSC – The Trip to Bountiful (Lifetime)
  - David Stockton, ASC – Gotham (Episode: "Pilot") (Fox)
  - Theo van de Sande, ASC – Deliverance Creek (Lifetime)

=== Other awards ===
- ASC International Award: Phil Méheux
- Bud Stone Award of Distinction: Denny Clairmont and Otto Nemenz
- Career Achievement in Television: Bill Roe
- Lifetime Achievement Award: John Bailey
- Presidents Award: Matthew F. Leonetti
