= 2012 American Society of Cinematographers Awards =

Annual US film and television awards

27th ASC Awards
- Date: February 10, 2013
- Site: Hollywood & Highland Ray Dolby Ballroom

Highlights
- Cinematography in Theatrical Releases: Skyfall

The 27th American Society of Cinematographers Awards were held on February 10, 2013, at the Hollywood & Highland Ray Dolby Ballroom, honoring the best cinematographers of film and television in 2012.

== Winners and nominees ==
=== Film ===
==== Outstanding Achievement in Cinematography in Theatrical Release ====
- Roger Deakins, ASC, BSC – Skyfall
  - Danny Cohen – Les Misérables
  - Janusz Kamiński – Lincoln
  - Seamus McGarvey – Anna Karenina
  - Claudio Miranda, ASC – Life of Pi

=== Television ===
==== Outstanding Achievement in Cinematography in Regular Series Half-Hour ====
- Bradford Lipson – Wilfred (Episode: "Truth") (FX)
  - Ken Glassing – Ben and Kate (Episode: "Guitar Face") (Fox)
  - Michael Goi, ASC – The New Normal (Episode: "Pilot") (NBC)
  - Peter Levy, ASC, ACS – House of Lies (Episode: "Gods of Dangerous Financial Instruments") (Showtime)
  - Michael Price – Happy Endings (Episode: "Four Weddings and a Funeral (Minus Three Weddings and One Funeral)") (ABC)

==== Outstanding Achievement in Cinematography in Regular Series One-Hour ====
- Balazs Bolygo, HSC – Hunted (Episode: "Mort") (Cinemax) (TIE)
- Kramer Morgenthau, ASC – Game of Thrones (Episode: "The North Remembers") (HBO) (TIE)
  - Chris Manley, ASC – Mad Men (Episode: "The Phantom") (AMC)
  - David Moxness, CSC – Fringe (Episode: "Letters of Transit") (Fox)
  - Michael Spragg – Strike Back (Episode: "Episode 11") (Cinemax)
  - David Stockton, ASC – Alcatraz (Episode: "Pilot") (Fox)

==== Outstanding Achievement in Cinematography in Motion Picture/Miniseries ====
- Florian Hoffmeister – Great Expectations (PBS)
  - Michael Goi, ASC – American Horror Story: Asylum (Episode: "I Am Anne Frank", Part 2) (FX)
  - Arthur Reinhart, PSC – Hatfields & McCoys (History)
  - Rogier Stoffers, ASC, NSC – Hemingway & Gellhorn (HBO)

=== Other awards ===
- Lifetime Achievement Award: Dean Semler, ASC, ACS
- Career Achievement in Television: Rodney Charters, ASC, CSC
- International Award: Robby Müller, NSC, BVK
- Presidents Award: Curtis Clark, ASC
- Bud Stone Award of Distinction: Milt Shefter
