= 2005 American Society of Cinematographers Awards =

20th ASC Awards
- Date: February 26, 2006

Highlights
- Cinematography in Theatrical Releases: Memoirs of a Geisha

The 20th American Society of Cinematographers Awards were held on February 26, 2006, honoring the best cinematographers of film and television in 2005.

== Winners and nominees ==
=== Film ===
Outstanding Achievement in Cinematography in Theatrical Releases

- Dion Beebe – Memoirs of a Geisha
  - Robert Elswit – Good Night, and Good Luck.
  - Andrew Lesnie – King Kong
  - Wally Pfister – Batman Begins
  - Rodrigo Prieto – Brokeback Mountain

=== Television ===
Outstanding Achievement in Cinematography in Miniseries, Pilot, or Television Film

- Warm Springs – Robbie Greenberg
  - Code Breakers – Thomas Del Ruth
  - Faith of My Fathers – Bill Roe
  - Into the West (Episode: "Wheel to the Stars") – Alan Caso
  - Reefer Madness: The Movie Musical – Jan Kiesser

Outstanding Achievement in Cinematography in Episodic TV Series

- CSI: Crime Scene Investigation (Episode: "Who Shot Sherlock?") – Nathan Hope
  - Carnivàle (Episode: "Los Moscos") – Jeffrey Jur
  - Las Vegas (Episode: "Everything Old Is You Again") – John Newby
  - Smallville (Episode: "Sacred") – Glen Winter
  - Without a Trace (Episode: "Freefall") – John B. Aronson
