= 1998 American Society of Cinematographers Awards =

Annual US film/tv awards ceremony

13th ASC Awards
- Date: February 21, 1999

Highlights
- Cinematography in Theatrical Releases: The Thin Red Line

The 13th American Society of Cinematographers Awards were held on February 21, 1999, honoring the best cinematographers of film and television in 1998.

== Winners ==
=== Film ===
- Outstanding Achievement in Cinematography – Theatrical Releases
  - The Thin Red Line – John Toll

=== Television ===
- Outstanding Achievement in Cinematography – Regular Series
  - The X-Files (Episode: "Drive") – Bill Roe

== Nominees ==
=== Film ===
- Outstanding Achievement in Cinematography – Theatrical Releases
  - Elizabeth – Remi Adefarasin
  - The Horse Whisperer – Robert Richardson
  - Saving Private Ryan – Janusz Kamiński
  - Shakespeare in Love – Richard Greatrex

=== Television ===
- Outstanding Achievement in Cinematography – Regular Series
  - JAG (Episode: "Gypsy Eyes") – Hugo Cortina
  - Michael Hayes (Episode: "Imagine") – James L. Carter
  - Millennium (Episode: "Skull and Bones") – Robert McLachlan
  - The X-Files (Episode: "Travelers") – Joel Ransom
