= Frank E. Johnson =

American film director

- Occupation: Cinematographer

Frank E. Johnson A.S.C. is an American cinematographer, producer and film director. He is best known for cinematography on The A-Team, but has also worked the camera for such feature films such as Predator (1987), The Taking of Beverly Hills (1991), and The Man in the Black Suit (2004). He was twice nominated for an ASC Award for "Outstanding Achievement in Cinematography", in 2000 and 2001. He has a film set for release in 2009 as producer and director for Shannon's Rainbow.

== Filmography ==
As director:

- Shannon's Rainbow (2009) (post-production)
- Touched by an Angel (1994) TV series
- Palace Guard (1991) TV series
- Wiseguy (1987) TV series

As cinematographer:

- Street 16 (2005)
- The Man in the Black Suit (2004)
- Water with Food Coloring (2001)
- Savannah (1996) TV series
- Alone in the Woods (1996)
- Marker(1995) TV series
- Touched by an Angel (1994) TV series
- Backstreet Justice (1994) a.k.a. Dead Wrong (Australia)
- Walker, Texas Ranger (1993) TV series
- Palace Guard (1991) TV series
- Captive (1991) (TV)
- The Taking of Beverly Hills (1991)
- Police Story: Gladiator School (1988) (TV)
- The A-Team (20 episodes, 1985–1986)
- Heated Vengeance (1985)
- Raw Force (1982) a.k.a. Kung Fu Cannibals (USA)
- The Last Reunion (1980) a.k.a. Ninja Nightmare
- Project: Kill (1976) (as Frank Johnson)
