= 2002 American Society of Cinematographers Awards =

Annual US film/tv awards ceremony

17th ASC Awards
- Date: February 16, 2003

Highlights
- Cinematography in Theatrical Releases: Road to Perdition

The 17th American Society of Cinematographers Awards were held on February 16, 2003, honoring the best cinematographers of film and television in 2002.

== Winners ==
- Outstanding Achievement in Cinematography in Theatrical Releases
  - Road to Perdition – Conrad L. Hall (posthumously)
- Outstanding Achievement in Cinematography in Movies of the Week/Mini-Series/Pilot for Network or Basic Broadcast TV
  - CSI: Miami (Episode: "Cross Jurisdiction") – Michael Barrett
- Outstanding Achievement in Cinematography in Episodic TV Series
  - MDs (Episode: "Wing and a Prayer") – Robert Primes
- Outstanding Achievement in Cinematography in Movies of the Week/Mini-Series/Pilot for Basic or Pay TV
  - Last Call – Jeff Jur
- Special Achievement Award
  - Roger Ebert
- Lifetime Achievement Award
  - Bill Butler
- Board of the Governors Award
  - Norman Jewison
- International Award
  - Witold Sobociński
- President's Award
  - Ralph Woolsey
