= 2004 American Society of Cinematographers Awards =

Annual US film/tv awards ceremony

19th ASC Awards
- Date: February 13, 2005

Highlights
- Cinematography in Theatrical Releases: A Very Long Engagement (Un long dimanche de fiançailles)

The 19th American Society of Cinematographers Awards were held on February 13, 2005, honoring the best cinematographers of film and television in 2004.

== Winners ==
=== Film ===
- Outstanding Achievement in Cinematography in Theatrical Releases
  - A Very Long Engagement (Un long dimanche de fiançailles) – Bruno Delbonnel

=== Television ===
- Outstanding Achievement in Cinematography in Movies of the Week/Mini-Series/Pilot for Network
  - Homeland Security – Jonathan Freeman
- Outstanding Achievement in Cinematography in Episodic TV Series
  - CSI: Crime Scene Investigation (Episode: "Down the Drain") – Nathan Hope
- Outstanding Achievement in Cinematography in Movies of the Week/Mini-Series/Pilot for Basic or Pay TV
  - Iron Jawed Angels – Robbie Greenberg
- Special Achievement Award
  - Leonard Maltin
- Lifetime Achievement Award
  - Fred J. Koenekamp
- Board of the Governors Award
  - Gilbert Cates
- International Award
  - Tonino Delli Colli
- President's Award
  - Richard Moore

== Nominees ==
- Outstanding Achievement in Cinematography in Theatrical Releases
  - The Aviator – Robert Richardson
  - Collateral – Dion Beebe and Paul Cameron
  - The Passion of the Christ – Caleb Deschanel
  - Ray – Paweł Edelman
- Outstanding Achievement in Cinematography in Movies of the Week/Mini-Series/Pilot for Basic or Pay TV
  - Frankenstein (Episode: "Part I") – Alan Caso
  - The Life and Death of Peter Sellers – Peter Levy
  - Salem's Lot – Ben Nott
  - Spartacus – Kees Van Oostrum
- Outstanding Achievement in Cinematography in Movies of the Week/Mini-Series/Pilot for Network
  - The Five People You Meet in Heaven – Kramer Morgenthau
  - Judas – Michael Goi
  - Lost (Episode: "Pilot") – Larry Fong
  - Medical Investigation (Episode: "Pilot") – J. Clark Mathis
- Outstanding Achievement in Cinematography in Episodic TV Series
  - CSI: NY (Episode: "A Man a Mile") – Chris Manley
  - Deadwood (Episode: "Deep Water") – David Boyd
  - The Sopranos (Episode: "Long Term Parking") – Alik Sakharov
  - The West Wing (Episode: "Gaza") – Thomas Del Ruth
