= 1999 American Society of Cinematographers Awards =

Annual US film/tv awards ceremony

14th ASC Awards
- Date: February 20, 2000

Highlights
- Cinematography in Theatrical Releases: American Beauty

The 14th American Society of Cinematographers Awards were held on February 20, 2000, honoring the best cinematographers of film and television in 1999.

== Winners and nominees ==
=== Film ===
Outstanding Achievement in Cinematography in Theatrical Releases

- American Beauty – Conrad L. Hall
  - The Insider – Dante Spinotti
  - The Sixth Sense – Tak Fujimoto
  - Sleepy Hollow – Emmanuel Lubezki
  - Snow Falling on Cedars – Robert Richardson

=== Television ===
Outstanding Achievement in Cinematography in Miniseries or Television Film

- Introducing Dorothy Dandridge – Robbie Greenberg

Outstanding Achievement in Cinematography in Regular Series

- The X-Files (Episode: "Agua Mala") – Bill Roe

=== Other awards ===
- ASC Heritage Award (Note: This year the award is named for Gregg Toland)
  - Andrew Huebscher
  - Christopher Popp
- Lifetime Achievement Award
  - William A. Fraker
- Board of the Governors Award
  - Warren Beatty
- International Award
  - Oswald Morris
- President's Award
  - Guy Green
