= 2003 American Society of Cinematographers Awards =

Annual US film/tv awards ceremony

18th ASC Awards
- Date: February 8, 2004

Highlights
- Cinematography in Theatrical Releases: Seabiscuit

The 18th American Society of Cinematographers Awards were held on February 8, 2004, honoring the best cinematographers of film and television in 2003.

== Winners ==
- Outstanding Achievement in Cinematography in Theatrical Releases
  - Seabiscuit – John Schwartzman
- Outstanding Achievement in Cinematography in Movies of the Week/Mini-Series/Pilot for Network or Basic Broadcast TV
  - Hitler: The Rise of Evil – Pierre Gill
- Outstanding Achievement in Cinematography in Episodic TV Series
  - Carnivàle (Episode: "Pick a Number") – Jeffrey Jur
- Outstanding Achievement in Cinematography in Movies of the Week/Mini-Series/Pilot for Basic or Pay TV
  - Carnivàle (Episode: "Milfay") – Tami Reiker
- Special Achievement Award
  - Kevin Brownlow
- Lifetime Achievement Award
  - Michael Chapman
- Board of the Governors Award
  - Irwin Winkler
- International Award
  - Miroslav Ondříček
- President's Award
  - Howard A. Anderson, Jr.
