= 2008 American Society of Cinematographers Awards =

Annual US film/tv awards ceremony

23rd ASC Awards
- Date: February 15, 2009

Highlights
- Cinematography in Film: Slumdog Millionaire

The 23rd American Society of Cinematographers Awards were held on February 15, 2009, honoring the best cinematographers of film and television in 2008.

== Winners and nominees ==
=== Film ===
- Anthony Dod Mantle – Slumdog Millionaire
  - Roger Deakins – Revolutionary Road
  - Roger Deakins and Chris Menges – The Reader
  - Claudio Miranda – The Curious Case of Benjamin Button
  - Wally Pfister – The Dark Knight

=== Television ===
==== Outstanding Achievement in Cinematography in Regular Series ====
- Nelson Cragg – CSI: Crime Scene Investigation (Episode: "For Gedda")
  - Ousama Rawi – The Tudors (Episode: "Everything Is Beautiful")
  - Stephen Reizes – Flashpoint (Episode: "Who's George?")
  - Gale Tattersall – House (Episode: "House's Head")
  - Glen Winter – Smallville (Episode: "Fracture")

==== Outstanding Achievement in Cinematography in Miniseries or Pilot ====
- David Stockton – Eleventh Hour (Episode: "Resurrection")
  - Oliver Bokelberg – My Own Worst Enemy (Episode: "Breakdown")
  - Michael Bonvillain – Fringe (Episode: "Pilot")
  - Jon Joffin – The Andromeda Strain (Episode: "Part 1")
  - Kramer Morgenthau – Life on Mars (Episode: "Out Here in the Fields")
