= Billy Dickson =

American cinematographer and television director

- Occupation(s): Cinematographer, television director, feature director
- Years active: 1980–present

Billy Dickson is an American cinematographer and television director.

As a cinematographer he is best known for his work on the television series Ally McBeal, for which he was nominated for two Primetime Emmy Awards for Outstanding Cinematography for a Single-Camera Series in 2001 and 2002. He was also a cinematographer for numerous television films and photographed the television series The Big Easy, Hidden Hills and 12 Miles of Bad Road.

As a television director, he directed episodes of Ally McBeal, One Tree Hill and the reality series Majors & Minors. In 2008, Dickson created the internet television series IQ-145, starring Thomas Dekker and Lindsey McKeon. Dickson also directed, edited, photographed and wrote all the episodes for the series. Billy was Writer/Director/DP/Executive Producer on the 2016 Christian Film of the Year Believe, distributed by Smith Global Media and Sony Home Entertainment.
