= 2018 American Society of Cinematographers Awards =

Annual US film and television awards

33rd ASC Awards
- Date: February 9, 2019
- Site: Hollywood & Highland Ray Dolby Ballroom

Highlights
- Cinematography in Theatrical Releases: Cold War

The 33rd American Society of Cinematographers Awards was held on February 9, 2019, at the Hollywood & Highland Ray Dolby Ballroom, honoring the best cinematographers of film and television in 2018.

The nominees for film and television were announced on January 7, 2019.

== Winners and nominees ==
=== Board of Directors Award ===
- Awarded to actor Jeff Bridges.

=== Film ===
==== Outstanding Achievement in Cinematography in Theatrical Release ====
- Łukasz Żal, PSC – Cold War
  - Alfonso Cuarón – Roma
  - Matthew Libatique, ASC – A Star Is Born
  - Robbie Ryan, BSC, ISC – The Favourite
  - Linus Sandgren, ASC, FSF – First Man

==== Spotlight Award ====
The Spotlight Award recognizes outstanding cinematography in features and documentaries that are typically screened at film festivals, in limited theatrical release, or outside the United States.

- Giorgi Shvelidze – Namme
  - Joshua James Richards – The Rider
  - Frank van den Eeden, NSC, SBC – Girl

=== Television ===
==== Outstanding Achievement in Cinematography in Regular Series for Non-Commercial Television ====
- Adriano Goldman, ASC, ABC, BSC – The Crown (Episode: "Beryl") (Netflix)
  - Gonzalo Amat – The Man in the High Castle (Episode: "Jahr Null") (Amazon)
  - David Klein, ASC – Homeland (Episode: "Paean to the People") (Showtime)
  - Colin Watkinson, ASC – The Handmaid's Tale (Episode: "The Word") (Hulu)
  - Cathal Watters, ISC – Peaky Blinders (Episode: "The Company") (Netflix)
  - Zoë White, ACS – The Handmaid's Tale (Episode: "Holly") (Hulu)

==== Outstanding Achievement in Cinematography in Regular Series for Commercial Television ====
- Jon Joffin, ASC – Beyond (Episode: "Two Zero One") (Freeform)
  - Nathaniel Goodman, ASC – Timeless (Episode: "The King of the Delta Blues") (NBC)
  - Ben Richardson – Yellowstone (Episode: "Daybreak") (Paramount Network)
  - David Stockton, ASC – Gotham (Episode: "A Dark Knight: Queen Takes Knight") (Fox)
  - Thomas Yatsko, ASC – Damnation (Episode: "A Different Species") (USA Network)

==== Outstanding Achievement in Cinematography in Television Movie, Miniseries, or Pilot ====
- James Friend, BSC – Patrick Melrose (Episode: "Bad News") (Showtime)
  - Mathias Herndl, AAC – Genius: Picasso (Episode: "Chapter 1") (NatGeo)
  - Florian Hoffmeister, BSC – The Terror (Episode: "Go for Broke") (AMC)
  - M. David Mullen, ASC – The Marvelous Mrs. Maisel (Episode: "Pilot") (Amazon)
  - Brendan Steacy, CSC – Alias Grace (Episode: "Part 1") (Netflix)

=== Other awards ===
- Lifetime Achievement Award: Robert Richardson, ASC
- Career Achievement in Television: Jeffrey Jur, ASC
