= Family Limitation =

1914 birth control guide

Family Limitation is a pamphlet written by American family planning activist, educator, writer, and nurse Margaret Sanger that was published in 1914. It was one of the first guides to birth control published in the United States. The 16-page pamphlet details information on, and ingredients for, various contraceptive methods and included illustrations and instructions for use. After the pamphlet was released, Sanger was forced to flee the United States to Britain to avoid prosecution under federal anti-obscenity laws, the Comstock Act, which prohibited disseminating information about contraception.

== Summary ==
The pamphlet is organized into several sections:.

- The introduction- A call to action by Sanger regarding the purpose and importance of birth control
- A Nurse's Advice to Women- Information regarding menstrual flow and timing of contraception
- Douches and Their Importance- How and when to douche and various formulas
- The Use of the Condom or "Cots"- Description of the condom and its protective and contraceptive properties
- The Pessary and the Sponge- Advice for placing the Pessary and Sponge and purchase price
- Vaginal Suppositories- A description of suppositories and suggestions for interacting with doctors. Further, ingredient lists and amounts

== Inspirations and influences ==
Margaret Sanger's intent in publishing Family Limitation was two-fold: to gain publicity surrounding anti-obscenity laws, and to educate middle and lower-class women. Sanger was a part of a feminist campaign that intentionally broke anti-obscenity laws with the goal of exposing the restrictions on birth control information. Sanger also desired for those reading the book, working-class women, to have "complete control over their bodies" for she felt that women and men could not stand equally in society if women were not given control over their own bodies

== Reception ==
At the time Family Limitation was published, the Comstock Act was enacted. The act criminalized sending literature on obscenity, contraceptives, abortifacients, and other "Obscene Literature" through the U.S. Postal Service. In early 1915, Sanger's husband, William Sanger, was caught selling copies of Family Limitation in the US; Sanger had fled to Europe to avoid prosecution after publishing the pamphlet. He served thirty days in jail for the crime. When Sanger returned to the United States in 1916, her case had been widely publicized, and the government refused to prosecute her.

== Later editions ==
Sanger published twelve versions of Family Limitation. Though the majority of the text remained the same, each edition added updated medical advice and provided additional contraceptive information. Many critics note that her views shifted from left-wing feminism to a more moderate form after her return from Europe. With each new edition, Sanger's inclusion of abortion in the pamphlets lessened (removed in 1921). The eighth and ninth editions of Family Limitation are missing.

== Bibliography ==
- Sanger, Margaret H. (1914). Family Limitation. New York, New York: Margaret Sanger Publishing. LCCN mm76038919. OCLC 48203307.
- Sanger, Margaret H. (1916). Family Limitation. New York, New York: Margaret Sanger Publishing. LCCN mm76038919. OCLC 21965717.
- Sanger, Margaret H. (1917). Family Limitation at Project Gutenberg
- Family Limitation by Margaret H. Sanger (1920) at Open Library
- Sanger, Margaret H. (1922). Family Limitation. New York, New York: Margaret Sanger Publishing. LCCN mm76038919. OCLC 701741298 – via Internet Archive.
