= 2015 American Society of Cinematographers Awards =

Film award

30th ASC Awards
- Date: February 15, 2016
- Site: Hollywood & Highland Ray Dolby Ballroom

Highlights
- Cinematography in Theatrical Releases: The Revenant

The 30th American Society of Cinematographers Awards were held on February 15, 2016, at the Hollywood & Highland Ray Dolby Ballroom, honoring the best cinematographers of film and television in 2015.

The film nominees were announced on January 6, 2016. Roger Deakins received a record fourteenth nomination for Sicario, while Emmanuel Lubezki picked up his record fifth award for The Revenant.

== Winners and nominees ==
=== Board of Directors Award ===
- Awarded to director and producer Ridley Scott.

=== Film ===
==== Outstanding Achievement in Cinematography in Theatrical Release ====
- Emmanuel Lubezki, ASC, AMC – The Revenant
  - Roger Deakins, ASC, BSC – Sicario
  - Janusz Kamiński – Bridge of Spies
  - Edward Lachman, ASC, AMC – Carol
  - John Seale, ASC, ACS – Mad Max: Fury Road

==== Spotlight Award ====
The Spotlight Award recognize[s] outstanding cinematography in features and documentaries that are typically screened at film festivals, in limited theatrical release, or outside the United States.

- Adam Arkapaw – Macbeth (TIE)
- Mátyás Erdély, HSC – Son of Saul (TIE)
  - Cary Joji Fukanaga – Beasts of No Nation

=== Television ===
==== Outstanding Achievement in Cinematography in Episode of a Regular Series ====
- Vanja Černjul, ASC, HFS – Marco Polo (Episode: "The Fourth Step") (Netflix)
  - David Greene, CSC – 12 Monkeys (Episode: "Mentally Divergent") (Syfy)
  - Christopher Norr – Gotham (Episode: "Strike Force") (Fox)
  - Crescenzo Notarile, ASC, AIC – Gotham (Episode: "Rise of the Villains: Scarification") (Fox)
  - Fabian Wagner, BSC – Game of Thrones (Episode: "Hardhome") (HBO)

==== Outstanding Achievement in Cinematography in Television Movie, Miniseries, or Pilot ====
- Pierre Gill, CSC – Casanova (Episode: "Pilot") (Amazon)
  - Martin Ahlgren – Blindspot (Episode: "Who is Jane Doe") (NBC)
  - James Hawkinson – The Man in the High Castle (Episode: "The New World") (Amazon)
  - Jeff Jur, ASC – Bessie (HBO)
  - Romain Lacourbas – Marco Polo (Episode: "The Wayfarer") (Netflix)

=== Other awards ===
- Career Achievement in Television: Lowell Peterson, ASC
- Presidents Award: Bill Bennett, ASC
