= Spirit of the Goat =

- Gotham episode
- Episode no.: Season 1 Episode 6
- Directed by: TJ Scott
- Written by: Ben Edlund
- Production code: 4X6656
- Original air date: October 27, 2014

Guest appearances
- Susan Misner as Dr. Marks; Christopher James Baker as Raymond Earl; Kim Director as Lacey White; Brian O'Neill as Robert Hastings; Carol Kane as Gertrude Kapelput; Dan Hedaya as Detective Dix; Chelsea Spack as Kristen Kringle

Episode chronology
← Previous "Viper"	Next → "Penguin's Umbrella"

"Spirit of the Goat" is the sixth episode of the television series Gotham. It premiered on FOX on October 27, 2014 and was written by Ben Edlund, his first credit for the show and directed by TJ Scott. In the episode, Bullock (Donal Logue) relives traumatic memories after a killer he thought it was closed years ago while Gordon suffers the consequences of his actions.

The episode was watched by 5.89 million viewers. Although this was a season low, it received positive reviews with critics commenting on Bullock's storyline.

== Plot ==
The episode begins with a flashback set 10 years ago. A young Bullock (Donal Logue) and his partner, Dix (Dan Hedaya) are sent to rescue a girl, Shelley Lawson, who was kidnapped by a vigilante known as the Spirit of the Goat, who kills the firstborn of Gotham's elite. They discover her dead and have a fight with the vigilante, revealed to be Randall Milkie. Dix falls into a trap while Bullock kills Milkie.

In the present, the body of a girl, Amanda Hastings, is discovered with a pattern very similar to the Spirit of the Goat. This convinces Bullock that maybe the Spirit of the Goat wasn't working alone in his crimes or not even dead after all. After another girl is kidnapped, Gordon (Ben McKenzie) and Bullock go to the same place ten years ago and they arrest the vigilante. The identity of the person is a janitor, Raymond Earl (Christopher James Baker), who had no relation to Milkie. Bullock then discovers that both had the same psychiatrist, Dr. Marks (Susan Misner), revealing that she hypnotized them to do her bidding.

When a longshoreman confesses witnessing Gordon killing Cobblepot (Robin Lord Taylor), Montoya (Victoria Cartagena) and Allen (Andrew Stewart-Jones) file an arrest warrant for Gordon. They arrest him in his apartment and they take him to the GCPD. Bullock tries to defend Gordon that he didn't kill Cobblepot and as everyone argues, Cobblepot appears in the door. Bullock then berates Gordon for his actions.

== Reception ==
=== Viewers ===
The episode was watched by 5.89 million viewers, with a 2.2 rating among 18-49 adults. With Live+7 DVR viewing factored in, the episode had an overall rating of 9.66 million viewers, and a 3.7 in the 18–49 demographic.

=== Critical reviews ===
Professional ratings
Review scores
Source	Rating
Rotten Tomatoes	69%
The A.V. Club	B−
Paste Magazine	8.0
TV Fanatic	3.9/5 stars
IGN	7.9
New York Magazine	3/5 stars

"Spirit of the Goat" received generally positive reviews. The episode received a rating of 69% on the review aggregator Rotten Tomatoes based on 26, with the site's consensus stating: "While Gotham finds its footing, 'The Spirit of the Goat' is a step in the right direction with much-needed character details about Oswald Cobblepot and Detective Bullock."

Matt Fowler of IGN gave the episode a "good" 7.9 out of 10 and wrote in his verdict, "With baby steps, Gotham is getting better. But not in a way that expressly deals with its biggest problems. Though taking a break from Fish this week, while having less Cobblepot than usual, was a nice indicator that bigger, better episode shakeups could be on the horizon."

The A.V. Club's Oliver Sava gave the episode a "B−" grade and wrote, "Harvey Bullock takes the spotlight in 'Spirit Of The Goat,' and Gotham is all the better for it. I've mentioned quite a few times in these reviews that the series needs to spend more time fleshing out the history of its characters, and this week's episode takes a break from the overarching mob war storyline to focus on Bullock's character and how he's changed from his early days on the GCPD. The result is a considerable improvement over the last few weeks, although this episode still has its fair share of problems."
