= 2016 American Society of Cinematographers Awards =

Annual US film and television awards

31st ASC Awards
- Date: February 4, 2017
- Site: Hollywood & Highland Ray Dolby Ballroom

Highlights
- Cinematography in Theatrical Releases: Lion

The 31st American Society of Cinematographers Awards were held on February 4, 2017, at the Hollywood & Highland Ray Dolby Ballroom, honoring the best cinematographers of film and television in 2016.

The television nominees were announced on December 6, 2016, while the film nominees were announced on January 11, 2017. The usual "Regular Series" category was separated into two categories this year—"Regular Series for Non-Commercial Television" and "Regular Series for Commercial Television".

== Winners and nominees ==
=== Board of Directors Award ===
- Awarded to director and actor Denzel Washington.

=== Film ===
==== Outstanding Achievement in Cinematography in Theatrical Release ====
- Greig Fraser, ASC, ACS – Lion
  - James Laxton – Moonlight
  - Rodrigo Prieto, ASC, AMC – Silence
  - Linus Sandgren, FSF – La La Land
  - Bradford Young, ASC – Arrival

==== Spotlight Award ====
The Spotlight Award recognizes outstanding cinematography in features and documentaries that are typically screened at film festivals, in limited theatrical release, or outside the United States.

- Gorka Gómez Andreu, AEC – House of Others
  - Lol Crawley, BSC – The Childhood of a Leader
  - Ernesto Pardo – Tempestad
  - Juliette van Dormael – My Angel

=== Television ===
==== Outstanding Achievement in Cinematography in Regular Series for Non-Commercial Television ====
- Fabian Wagner, BSC – Game of Thrones (Episode: "Battle of the Bastards") (HBO)
  - John Conroy – Penny Dreadful (Episode: "The Day Tennyson Died") (Showtime)
  - David Dunlap – House of Cards (Episode: "Chapter 45") (Netflix)
  - Anette Haellmigk – Game of Thrones (Episode: "Book of the Stranger") (HBO)
  - Neville Kidd – Outlander (Episode: "Prestonpans") (Starz)

==== Outstanding Achievement in Cinematography in Regular Series for Commercial Television ====
- Tod Campbell – Mr. Robot (Episode: "eps2.0_unm4sk-pt1.tc") (USA)
  - John Grillo – Preacher (Episode: "Finish the Song") (AMC)
  - Kevin McKnight – Underground (Episode: "The Macon 7") (WGN)
  - Christopher Norr – Gotham (Episode: "Wrath of the Villains: Mr. Freeze") (Fox)
  - Richard Rutkowski – Manhattan (Episode: "Jupiter") (WGN)

==== Outstanding Achievement in Cinematography in Television Movie, Miniseries, or Pilot ====
- Igor Martinovic – The Night Of (Episode: "Subtle Beast") (HBO)
  - Balazs Bolygo, HSC, BSC – Harley and the Davidsons (Episode: "Amazing Machine") (Discovery)
  - Paul Cameron, ASC – Westworld (Episode: "The Original") (HBO)
  - Jim Denault, ASC – All the Way (HBO)
  - Alex Disenhof – The Exorcist (Episode: "Chapter One: And Let My Cry Come Unto Thee") (Fox)

=== Other awards ===
- Lifetime Achievement Award: Edward Lachman, ASC
- Career Achievement in Television: Ron García, ASC
- International Award: Philippe Rousselot, ASC, AFC
- Presidents Award: Nancy Schreiber, ASC
