= Nathan Hope =

American film director

- Occupation(s): Cinematographer, film director, television director
- Years active: 1999–present

Nathan Hope is an American cinematographer and director of film and television.

As a cinematographer, his film credits include Hellraiser: Inferno (2000), Mimic 2 (2001), Suckers (2001), Rolling Kansas (2003, Thomas Haden Church's directorial debut), Who's Your Daddy? (2004, Andy Fickman's directorial debut) and The Fog (2005).

In television, he has photographed episodes of Fastlane, CSI: Crime Scene Investigation, Dark Blue and Miami Medical (also a director for the latter three series).

As a director, his first directing credit was the short film Lucky (2005), also the editor and screenwriter. In 2009, he made his feature film directing debut with the film Elsewhere starring Anna Kendrick and Paul Wesley, he was also a co-screenwriter for the film. Some of his television directing credits include Cold Case, CSI: NY, Nikita, Body of Proof, Ringer, The Whole Truth, Gotham, Lucifer and CSI: Vegas.

Hope has won three American Society of Cinematographers Awards for his cinematography work on CSI: Crime Scene Investigation in 2004, 2005, and 2006.
