= Michael Wale =

Canadian cinematographer and director

- Other name: Michael Thomas Wale
- Occupations: Television cinematographer, director
- Years active: 1994–present
- Website: www.michaelwale.com

Michael Wale is a Canadian cinematographer and director known for his work on The WB / CW television series Smallville and iZombie as well as the Fox television series Fringe and Almost Human.

== Career ==
Wale began his career as a camera trainee on Chris Carter's The X-Files. He worked on several films and television series as a camera assistant and later as a camera operator on So Weird, Just Cause, and The L Word. As a cinematographer his work included: Sk8, Sub Zero, The Troop and Continuum. He served on the second season of CW Network's iZombie as director of "The Hurt Stalker" which premiered in late 2015.

Wale served as cinematographer on the final season of Superman prequel series Smallville, on which he first served as second unit camera operator, and then series cinematographer. He went on to be nominated for an award for best cinematography in a dramatic series from both the American Society of Cinematographers (ASC) and the Canadian Society of Cinematographers (CSC) in 2010.

Wale served as cinematographer on the final season of Fringe and on the final season of Almost Human.

Wale served as cinematographer on the first two seasons of Continuum. He was nominated and won a Leo Award for best cinematography in 2014.

Wale served as cinematographer on the first and second season of iZombie. He was also given the opportunity to direct episode 208, "The Hurt Stalker". Wale also garnished a second Leo Award nomination for cinematography for his work on the series in 2015.

In 2016, it was confirmed that Wale would be returning to iZombie for a third season as both cinematographer and director.

Since iZombie, Michael has gone on to shoot several high profile televisions series. Motherland: Fort Salem, Peacemaker, From, The Night Agent, Alaska Daily, Yellowjackets and most recently Carrie.
