= Game of Thrones season 4 =

Game of Thrones
- Season 4
- Region 1 DVD artwork
- Showrunners: David Benioff; D. B. Weiss
- Starring: Peter Dinklage; Nikolaj Coster-Waldau; Lena Headey; Emilia Clarke; Kit Harington; Charles Dance; Natalie Dormer; Jack Gleeson; Sophie Turner; Maisie Williams; John Bradley; Rose Leslie; Kristofer Hivju; Rory McCann; Gwendoline Christie; Jerome Flynn; Sibel Kekilli; Iain Glen; Liam Cunningham; Stephen Dillane; Carice van Houten; Alfie Allen; Isaac Hempstead Wright; Iwan Rheon; Conleth Hill; Aidan Gillen; Hannah Murray
- No. of episodes: 10

Release
- Original network: HBO
- Original release: April 6 – June 15, 2014

Season chronology
- ← Previous; Season 3 Next → Season 5

The fourth season of the fantasy drama television series Game of Thrones premiered in the United States on HBO on April 6, 2014, and concluded on June 15, 2014. It was broadcast on Sunday at 9:00 pm in the United States, consisting of 10 episodes, each running approximately 50–60 minutes. The season is adapted primarily from the second half of A Storm of Swords, along with elements of A Feast for Crows and A Dance with Dragons, all novels from the A Song of Ice and Fire series by George R. R. Martin. The series is adapted for television by David Benioff and D. B. Weiss. HBO ordered the fourth season on April 2, 2013, which began filming in July 2013. The season was filmed primarily in Iceland, Northern Ireland and Croatia.

The story takes place in a fictional world, primarily upon a continent called Westeros, with one storyline occurring on another continent to the east, Essos. After the death of Robb Stark at The Red Wedding, all three remaining kings in Westeros believe they have a claim to the Iron Throne. King Joffrey is killed by poison at his wedding, and his uncle Tyrion is blamed; young Tommen Baratheon is crowned king. Meanwhile, Sansa Stark escapes King's Landing. At the Wall, Jon Snow and the Night's Watch, badly outnumbered, begin a grim battle against 100,000 Wildlings, but Stannis's army sweeps in to demand the Wildlings' surrender. Bran Stark's visions lead him far beyond the Wall to the north, where he meets the Three-Eyed Raven. Daenerys Targaryen captures Meereen and decides to rule as queen of Slaver's Bay until she can permanently defeat the slavers; she finds ruling more difficult than conquering. She reluctantly chains up her growing dragons, who have become difficult to control. Arya Stark crisscrosses Westeros accompanied by the Hound, but sails alone to Braavos in Essos to end the season.

Game of Thrones features a large ensemble cast, including Peter Dinklage, Nikolaj Coster-Waldau, Lena Headey, Emilia Clarke and Kit Harington. The season introduced a number of new cast members, including Pedro Pascal, Indira Varma, Michiel Huisman and Dean-Charles Chapman.

Critics praised the show's production values and cast, with specific accolades for Dinklage's portrayal of Tyrion Lannister. Viewership yet again rose compared to the previous season. It won four of the 19 Emmy Awards for which it was nominated.

== Episodes ==
| No. overall | No. in season | Title | Directed by | Written by | Original release date | U.S. viewers (millions) |
|---|---|---|---|---|---|---|
| 31 | 1 | "Two Swords" | D. B. Weiss | David Benioff & D. B. Weiss | April 6, 2014 | 6.64 |
Tywin oversees the reforging of Ice, House Stark's ancestral Valyrian steel sword, into two new ones. One is for Jaime, who grieves the loss of his sword hand and Cersei's love, and the other is a wedding present for King Joffrey, which Joffrey names Widow's Wail. Prince Oberyn Martell, representing his infirm brother, Prince Doran of Dorne, arrives in King's Landing to attend the royal wedding. He and his paramour, Ellaria Sand, are greeted by Tyrion. Oberyn tells Tyrion that he has another motive for coming to the capital, as he is seeking revenge against Lannisters and Gregor Clegane for the rape and murder of his sister, Elia, wife of the unfaithful Prince Rhaegar Targaryen. In the North, Styr and the cannibalistic Thenns reinforce Tormund, Ygritte and the other Wildlings forces south of the wall. Maester Aemon absolves Jon after he justifies his actions while with the Wildlings and reveals that their army of 100,000 plans to attack Castle Black. In the Riverlands, the Hound and Arya head to the Eyrie where the Hound intends to ransom Arya to her Aunt Lysa, Jon Arryn's widow. Along the way, they get into a fight with a group of Gregor Clegane's soldiers in an inn and Arya reclaims her sword, Needle, from Polliver, killing him. In Essos, Daenerys marches her army towards Meereen, the last and largest of the three great slave cities; she fears she is losing control over her growing dragons, now horse-sized.
| 32 | 2 | "The Lion and the Rose" | Alex Graves | George R. R. Martin | April 13, 2014 | 6.31 |
Roose Bolton returns to the Dreadfort with his bride, one of Walder Frey's daughters. He chastises Ramsay for torturing and castrating Theon, devaluing him as a hostage. Theon, who has degenerated into a subservient persona called 'Reek', discloses that Bran and Rickon Stark are alive and threaten Roose's legitimacy as Warden of the North. Roose orders Ramsay to reclaim the territories under Ironborn occupation, promising a reward if he succeeds, while also sending Locke to capture Bran and Rickon. In Dragonstone, Melisandre sacrifices three people, including Stannis' brother-in-law, burning them to death as a tribute to the Lord of Light, delighting Queen Selyse and disgusting Ser Davos and Princess Shireen. To protect Shae from his family, Tyrion arranges to send her to Pentos across the Narrow Sea, leaving her distressed. Bronn secretly trains Jaime to be able to fight with his left hand. King Joffrey and Margaery Tyrell are wed. During the Royal Wedding feast, Joffrey publicly humiliates Tyrion and taunts Sansa just before he fatally succumbs to poisoned wine. A distraught Cersei accuses Tyrion of the murder and has him arrested, while Ser Dontos Hollard, Joffrey's fool and a former knight, persuades Sansa to leave the feast with him for her protection.
| 33 | 3 | "Breaker of Chains" | Alex Graves | David Benioff & D. B. Weiss | April 20, 2014 | 6.59 |
Tywin grooms his young grandson Tommen to be the new king and enlists Oberyn and Mace Tyrell as his fellow judges for Tyrion's impending murder trial. Tyrion chooses Jaime as his witness. Littlefinger, who hired Ser Dontos to retrieve Sansa, has him killed, then smuggles her out of King's Landing aboard his ship. In the Riverlands, Arya and the Hound are offered hospitality by a peasant farmer and his daughter, whom the Hound soon robs, angering Arya. To replenish Stannis' depleted forces, Davos wants to request a loan from the Iron Bank of Braavos to hire a mercenary army from Essos. At Castle Black, Sam fears for Gilly's safety and moves her and Little Sam to nearby Mole's Town. Meanwhile, the Wildlings continue to raid northern villages. The Night's Watch learns that the mutineers are camped at Craster's Keep. Jon proposes an attack on them to prevent them leaking Castle Black's defense weaknesses to Mance Rayder's approaching army. Daenerys arrives at Meereen and gives a rousing speech before the gates, offering the city's slaves their freedom.
| 34 | 4 | "Oathkeeper" | Michelle MacLaren | Bryan Cogman | April 27, 2014 | 6.95 |
Daenerys easily captures Meereen, instigating a slave revolt. Seeking justice for 163 slain slave children, she nails 163 masters to the same road posts. At sea, Littlefinger tells Sansa that he had plotted Joffrey's murder with the Tyrells and that it was Olenna who had administered the poison to protect her granddaughter. Before leaving King's Landing, Olenna reveals her guilt to Margaery and urges her to seduce Tommen, who will be a much kinder and more pliable husband. Jaime believes Tyrion is innocent, but Cersei is adamant he is guilty and also orders Jaime to locate and kill Sansa, whom she believes was an accomplice. Jaime instead sends Brienne to find and protect Sansa, presenting her with new armor, his Valyrian Steel sword, which she names Oathkeeper, horses and Podrick Payne as her squire. In the North, hoping to eliminate Jon, Alliser Thorne and Janos Slynt agree to allow Jon to lead the expedition against the mutineers. Unknown to Jon, the mutineers have captured Bran and his companions. Further north, a White Walker takes Craster's last newborn son to a secret ritual site where he is transformed into a Walker by the Night King.
| 35 | 5 | "First of His Name" | Michelle MacLaren | David Benioff & D. B. Weiss | May 4, 2014 | 7.16 |
Tommen is crowned king and Cersei surprises Margaery by apparently approving of her match with Tommen. Tywin asks Oberyn to be a judge at Tyrion's trial and swears his innocence in Elia's rape and murder. In the Vale, Littlefinger takes Sansa to the Eyrie where she is reunited with her aunt, Lysa Arryn, who pressures Littlefinger to marry her immediately. It is revealed that Littlefinger had manipulated Lysa into poisoning her husband Jon Arryn and framing the Lannisters, setting the conflict between the Starks and Lannisters in motion. Lysa plans for Sansa to marry her son, Robin, an emotionally immature prepubescent boy. The Hound mocks Arya practicing her water dancing and disparages Syrio Forel's fighting style. Brienne learns that Podrick lacks practical squiring skills but is impressed he killed a Kingsguard to protect Tyrion. Beyond the Wall, Jon's group find and defeat the mutineers, while Rast, attempting to escape, is killed by Ghost. Unknown to Jon, Bran and his companions are captives there. Locke attempts to kidnap Bran in the confusion, but Hodor, warged into by Bran, kills him and frees the others. Jojen convinces Bran that they must continue north, while Jon's men burn Craster's Keep and free his daughter/wives. In Meereen, after Jorah informs Daenerys that Astapor and Yunkai have reverted to slavery, she postpones invading Westeros to instead rule as queen until Slaver's Bay is truly free.
| 36 | 6 | "The Laws of Gods and Men" | Alik Sakharov | Bryan Cogman | May 11, 2014 | 6.40 |
In Essos, Davos and Stannis meet with Tycho Nestoris of the Iron Bank to secure a loan for Stannis. Davos re-engages Salladhor Saan and his pirates to transport Stannis' army north. In Meereen, Daenerys adapts to her new role as queen, hearing her subjects' endless requests, including nobleman Hizdahr zo Loraq who wishes to reclaim his crucified father's body, and a peasant man whose goats were killed by Daenerys' increasingly uncontrollable dragons. Yara leads a mission to rescue Theon at the Dreadfort, however, fearing it is a trap, Theon refuses to leave forcing Yara to abandon him. Ramsay rewards Theon's obedience and, planning to capture Moat Cailin from the Ironborn, tasks "Reek" to impersonate "Theon Greyjoy". In King's Landing, Tywin puts a bounty on the Hound's head and instructs Varys to continue spying on Daenerys. Tyrion is tried for Joffrey's murder. All the witnesses testify against him, including Ser Meryn Trant, Grand Maester Pycelle, Cersei, and Varys, who give compelling, though circumstantial, testimony. Tywin tells Jaime that he will spare Tyrion's life and let him join the Night's Watch, if he confesses his guilt and Jaime quits the Kingsguard and takes his place as Tywin's heir. Tyrion initially agrees, however when Shae falsely testifies against him, he angrily denounces the whole of King's Landing as liars and demands a trial by combat.
| 37 | 7 | "Mockingbird" | Alik Sakharov | David Benioff & D. B. Weiss | May 18, 2014 | 7.20 |
Cersei appoints Ser Gregor Clegane, the Mountain, as the champion for the prosecution in Tyrion's upcoming trial by combat. Jaime and Bronn decline to fight the Mountain for Tyrion, but Oberyn accepts. He seeks to avenge his sister, Elia's rape and murder by the Mountain during Robert's Rebellion. Daenerys takes Daario as her lover, then sends him to handle the resurgent slavers in Yunkai. Melisandre and Selyse prepare to depart Dragonstone, intending to take Shireen with them. As the Wildlings approach Castle Black, Alliser Thorne rejects Jon's suggestion that they seal the tunnel. At an inn, Brienne and Podrick meet Hot Pie, who updates them about Arya. They resolve to travel to the Vale, deducing that she would seek shelter from her aunt. In the Vale, Lysa witnesses Littlefinger kissing Sansa. Enraged, she threatens to throw Sansa through the Moon Door, a circular opening in the floor with a steep drop to rocks below; Littlefinger intervenes and, after admitting to Lysa that he always loved her sister Catelyn rather than her, shoves Lysa to her death.
| 38 | 8 | "The Mountain and the Viper" | Alex Graves | David Benioff & D. B. Weiss | June 1, 2014 | 7.17 |
The Wildlings attack Mole's Town. Ygritte discovers Gilly hiding and spares her and Little Sam. Ramsay forces Theon to negotiate with the Ironborn to surrender Moat Cailin. The Ironborn agree, hoping to return home, but Ramsay reneges his promise and has them flayed to death. As a reward for securing Moat Cailin, Roose legitimizes Ramsay as a Bolton, making him his heir. At the Eyrie, the Lords of the Vale investigate Lysa's death. Sansa reveals her true identity to them and corroborates Littlefinger's story that she committed suicide, enabling Littlefinger to assume the role of Robin's guardian. The Hound and Arya arrive at the Gates of the Moon, only to leave upon learning of Lysa's death. In King's Landing, the trial by combat begins. Oberyn grievously wounds the Mountain, however delays finishing him off as he wants him to publicly confess his and Tywin's culpability in Elia's murder. Near death, the Mountain trips Oberyn and brutally crushes his skull while boasting that he raped and murdered Elia and her children. Tywin sentences Tyrion to death. In Essos, Grey Worm and Missandei grow closer. Barristan Selmy intercepts a long-delayed pardon from King Robert for Jorah as a reward for spying on Daenerys. He gives this to Daenerys, who is deaf to Jorah's remorse and banishes him from her service.
| 39 | 9 | "The Watchers on the Wall" | Neil Marshall | David Benioff & D. B. Weiss | June 8, 2014 | 6.95 |
The Night's Watch prepares the Castle Black defences ahead of the upcoming battle with the Wildlings. Gilly and Little Sam escape Mole's Town and arrive at Castle Black, where Sam hides them. The Wildlings attack from both sides of the wall and Pyp is killed by an arrow from Ygritte. Tormund's army breaks through from the south and engages the Night's Watch, while the Wildlings climbing the wall are obliterated by a massive swinging scythe trap. A giant breaches the tunnel into Castle Black but is killed by Grenn and five others, at the cost of their own lives. Alliser Thorne is wounded in a duel with Tormund and forced to withdraw, leaving Jon to take charge of the defence. After seeing Jon kill Styr, Ygritte aims her bow at him but hesitates, then is fatally shot by Olly, dying in Jon's arms. Assisted by Ghost, Jon's direwolf, the Night's Watch secure Castle Black's inner keep, and a wounded Tormund is captured. The Wildlings retreat for the night. Jon goes beyond the Wall on a suicide mission to find and kill Mance Rayder, believing that the Wildling army will fragment without his command.
| 40 | 10 | "The Children" | Alex Graves | David Benioff & D. B. Weiss | June 15, 2014 | 7.09 |
Jon's meeting with Mance Rayder abruptly ends when Stannis and his army overrun the Wildling camp, taking Mance prisoner. Bran finds the weirwood tree from his visions but wights attack the group, killing Jojen. A Child of the Forest saves the others and takes them to the Three-Eyed Raven, revealed to be an old man encased within tree roots inside a secure cave. In the Vale, Brienne and Podrick encounter Arya and the Hound. A misunderstanding leads to the Hound and Brienne having a duel; which ends with Brienne pushing the Hound off a cliff. The Hound, grievously wounded, begs Arya to kill him, but she takes his money and leaves him for dead. She boards a ship headed to Braavos to find Jaqen H'ghar. In King's Landing, Cersei orders Qyburn to save the life of the Mountain, who was poisoned by Oberyn's blade. Jaime releases Tyrion from prison, but before escaping the city, Tyrion finds Shae in Tywin's bed and fatally strangles her. He confronts and kills Tywin on the privy with a crossbow, then is smuggled aboard a ship by Varys. In Meereen, a citizen brings Daenerys his daughter's charred remains, burned by dragon fire. Realising they are too dangerous to remain free, Daenerys chains Rhaegal and Viserion in the catacombs, however Drogon cannot be found.

== Cast ==
=== Main cast ===
- Peter Dinklage as Tyrion Lannister
- Nikolaj Coster-Waldau as Jaime Lannister
- Lena Headey as Cersei Lannister
- Emilia Clarke as Daenerys Targaryen
- Kit Harington as Jon Snow
- Charles Dance as Tywin Lannister
- Natalie Dormer as Margaery Tyrell
- Jack Gleeson as Joffrey Baratheon
- Sophie Turner as Sansa Stark
- Maisie Williams as Arya Stark
- John Bradley as Samwell Tarly
- Rose Leslie as Ygritte
- Kristofer Hivju as Tormund Giantsbane
- Rory McCann as Sandor "The Hound" Clegane
- Gwendoline Christie as Brienne of Tarth
- Jerome Flynn as Bronn
- Sibel Kekilli as Shae
- Iain Glen as Jorah Mormont
- Liam Cunningham as Davos Seaworth
- Stephen Dillane as Stannis Baratheon
- Carice van Houten as Melisandre
- Alfie Allen as Theon Greyjoy / "Reek"
- Isaac Hempstead Wright as Bran Stark
- Iwan Rheon as Ramsay Snow / Ramsay Bolton
- Conleth Hill as Varys
- Aidan Gillen as Petyr "Littlefinger" Baelish
- Hannah Murray as Gilly

=== Guest cast ===
The recurring actors listed here are those who appeared in season 4. They are listed by the region in which they first appear:

==== At and beyond the Wall ====
- Owen Teale as Alliser Thorne
- Peter Vaughan as Maester Aemon
- Brian Fortune as Othell Yarwyck
- Dominic Carter as Janos Slynt
- Ben Crompton as Eddison Tollett
- Noah Taylor as Locke
- Mark Stanley as Grenn
- Josef Altin as Pypar
- Luke Barnes as Rast
- Burn Gorman as Karl Tanner
- Brenock O'Connor as Olly
- Lu Corfield as the Mole's Town madam
- Lois Winstone as a Mole's Town prostitute
- Ciarán Hinds as Mance Rayder
- Yuri Kolokolnikov as Styr
- Ian Whyte as Dongo
- Joseph Gatt as a Thenn warg
- Deirdre Monaghan as Morag
- Jane McGrath as Sissy
- Thomas Brodie-Sangster as Jojen Reed
- Ellie Kendrick as Meera Reed
- Kristian Nairn as Hodor
- Struan Rodger as the Three-Eyed Raven
- Octavia Alexandru as Leaf
- Richard Brake as the Night King
- Ross Mullan as White Walkers

==== In the North ====
- Michael McElhatton as Roose Bolton
- Elizabeth Webster as Walda Bolton
- Gemma Whelan as Yara Greyjoy
- Charlotte Hope as Myranda

==== In the Vale ====
- Lino Facioli as Robin Arryn
- Kate Dickie as Lysa Arryn
- Rupert Vansittart as Yohn Royce
- Alisdair Simpson as Donnel Waynwood

==== In King's Landing ====
- Dean-Charles Chapman as Tommen Baratheon
- Julian Glover as Grand Maester Pycelle
- Roger Ashton-Griffiths as Mace Tyrell
- Finn Jones as Loras Tyrell
- Diana Rigg as Olenna Tyrell
- Pedro Pascal as Oberyn Martell
- Indira Varma as Ellaria Sand
- Ian Beattie as Meryn Trant
- Hafþór Júlíus Björnsson as Gregor Clegane
- Daniel Portman as Podrick Payne
- Tony Way as Dontos Hollard
- Paul Bentley as the High Septon
- Anton Lesser as Qyburn
- Will Tudor as Olyvar
- Josephine Gillan as Marei
- Pixie Le Knot as Kayla

==== On Dragonstone ====
- Tara Fitzgerald as Selyse Florent
- Kerry Ingram as Shireen Baratheon

==== In the Riverlands ====
- Gary Oliver as Ternesio Terys
- Andy Kellegher as Polliver
- Andy Beckwith as Rorge
- Gerard Jordan as Biter
- Ben Hawkey as Hot Pie

==== In Braavos ====
- Mark Gatiss as Tycho Nestoris
- Lucian Msamati as Salladhor Saan
- Sarine Sofair as Lhara

==== In Slaver's Bay ====
- Michiel Huisman as Daario Naharis
- Ian McElhinney as Barristan Selmy
- Nathalie Emmanuel as Missandei
- Jacob Anderson as Grey Worm
- Joel Fry as Hizdahr zo Loraq
- Reece Noi as Mossador

== Production ==
On April 2, 2013, HBO announced it had renewed the series for a fourth season, to consist of 10 episodes.

=== Crew ===
David Benioff and D. B. Weiss serve as main writers and showrunners for the fourth season. They co-wrote seven out of ten episodes. The remaining three episodes were written by Bryan Cogman (two episodes), and the author of A Song of Ice and Fire, George R. R. Martin (one episode).

Benioff and Weiss co-directed the season premiere after making their directorial debut in season 3, although only Weiss is credited as Benioff received credit for their previous directed episode; Alex Graves, who directed two episodes in season 3, returned and directed episodes 2, 3, 8 and 10; Michelle MacLaren, who also directed two episodes in season 3, returned to direct episodes 4 and 5; former series cinematographer Alik Sakharov, who directed in seasons 2 and 3, returned to direct episodes 6 and 7; and Neil Marshall directed episode 9 after previously directing "Blackwater", the ninth episode of season 2.

=== Casting ===
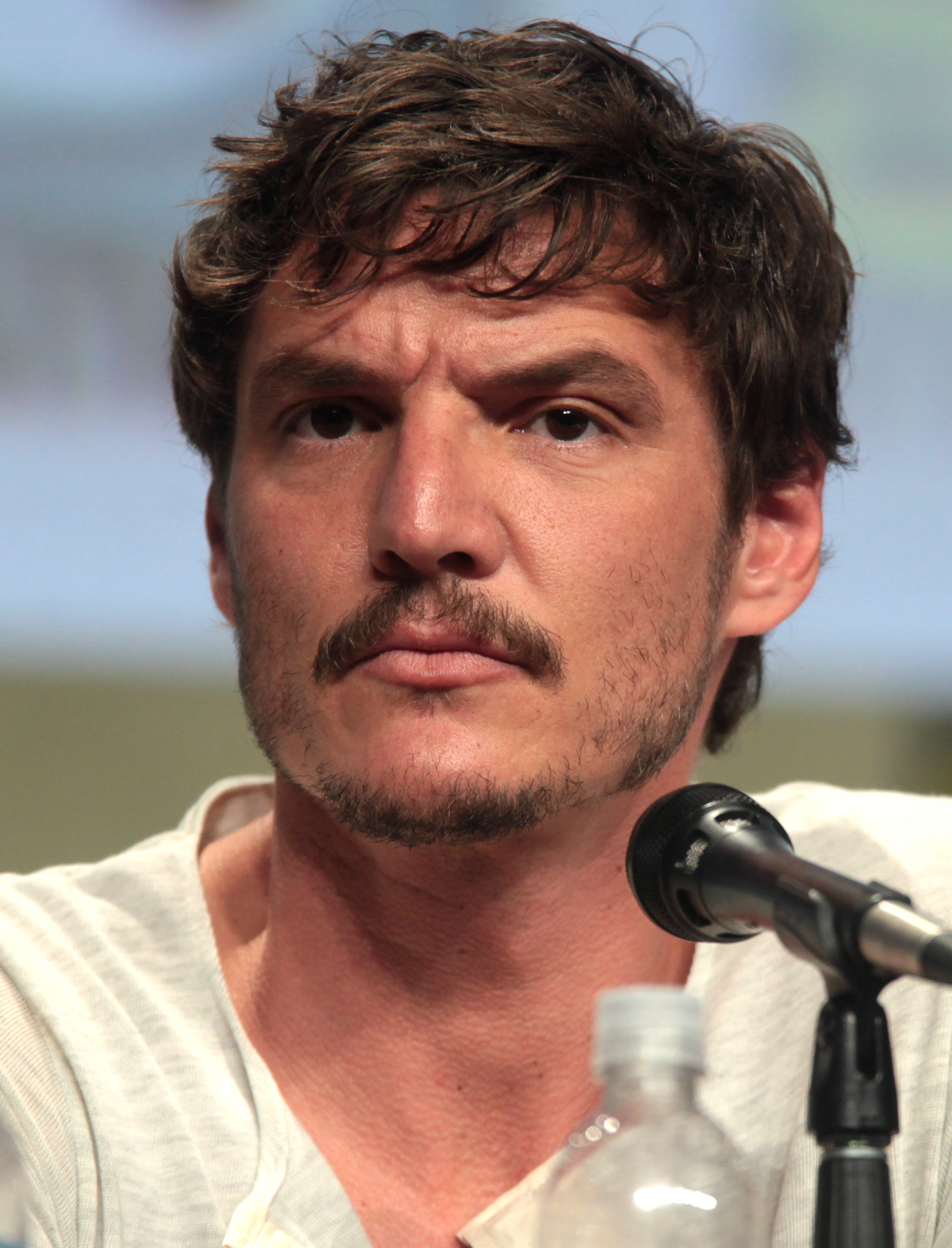
Pedro Pascal plays Oberyn Martell.

The fourth season adds previously recurring actors Gwendoline Christie (Brienne of Tarth), Iwan Rheon (Ramsay Snow), Kristofer Hivju (Tormund Giantsbane) and Hannah Murray (Gilly) to the series' main cast. Iain Glen's credit is moved last in the rotation and given the "With" moniker.

Prince Oberyn Martell, nicknamed "The Red Viper", is played by Chilean-American actor Pedro Pascal. "This was a tough one", said showrunners David Benioff and Dan Weiss about the casting. "The Red Viper is sexy and charming, yet believably dangerous; intensely likable, yet driven by hate. The boys love him, the girls love him, and he loves them all back. Unless your last name is Lannister. We found a fellow who can handle the job description and make it seem effortless. He wasn't easy to find and he won't be easy to stop". Martin commented on the casting by saying: "I wasn't present for Pedro Pascal's audition, but I understand that he really killed it with his reading. And since his casting was announced, the producer of another TV show on which he appeared recently has written me to say how terrific Pascal is, and to congratulate us on the casting. So I suspect that he will turn out to be a wonderful Red Viper". Actress Indira Varma was cast as Ellaria Sand, Prince Oberyn's paramour.

Roger Ashton-Griffiths joins the cast in the role of Mace Tyrell. "The lord oaf of Highgarden", as his mother describes him, is otherwise known as father to Margaery and Loras. His casting was confirmed by George R. R. Martin, who introduced the actor as the solution to a riddle he'd set fans with the following message, "Yes, it's the fine British character actor Roger Ashton-Griffiths, who has been cast in the role of Mace Tyrell, son to the Queen of Thorns, and father of Loras and Margaery".

Mark Gatiss plays Tycho Nestoris, a representative of the Iron Bank of Braavos, to whom the Iron Throne owes millions in borrowed gold. The role of Hizdahr zo Loraq is played by young British actor Joel Fry. Hizdahr is the young scion of an ancient Meereenese family who crosses paths with Daenerys Targaryen in Meereen. Elizabeth Webster was cast as Fat Walda Frey. Walda Frey is a granddaughter of Lord Walder Frey. She is the new wife of Roose Bolton, the Lord of the Dreadfort. During the wedding feast of Edmure Tully and Roslin Frey, Lord Bolton recounts to Catelyn Stark and Ser Brynden "Blackfish" Tully how Lord Walder Frey proposed him to marry one of his granddaughters and offered her weight in silver as dowry. Lord Bolton then adds he chose the fattest bride available and she has made him very rich. Paola Dionisotti and Rupert Vansittart were cast as Lady Anya Waynwood and Bronze Yohn Royce. They are the heads of House Waynwood and House Royce of Runestone: two powerful vassal houses of House Arryn. Yuri Kolokolnikov plays Styr: One of Mance Rayder's lieutenants and the Magnar – the name of the first ever Lord of Thenn which is now a title – of the Thenn people, a wildling clan. Two mysterious characters from Bran's storyline have also been cast: the Three-Eyed Raven, who is played by Struan Rodger, and a Child of the Forest, played by Octavia Alexandru.

Roles that were recast for season 4 include Michiel Huisman as Daario Naharis. Huisman replaces Ed Skrein, who portrayed the character in season 3. Dean-Charles Chapman plays the role of Tommen Baratheon, King Joffrey's younger brother. Tommen was played by Callum Wharry in seasons 1 and 2. Chapman appeared as Martyn Lannister in two episodes of season 3 ("Walk of Punishment" and "Kissed by Fire"). Hafþór Júlíus Björnsson was cast as Ser Gregor Clegane, called "The Mountain". Hafþór replaces Ian Whyte, who portrayed the character in season 2.

After an absence of at least a season, Owen Teale returns as Alliser Thorne, Kate Dickie as Lysa Arryn, Dominic Carter as Janos Slynt, Tony Way as Dontos Hollard, Andy Beckwith as Rorge, Gerard Jordan as Biter, Andy Kellegher as Polliver, Lino Facioli as Robin Arryn and Brian Fortune as Othell Yarwyck.

=== Filming ===
Filming for the season began on July 8, 2013, in Northern Ireland. The series also returned to Iceland and Dubrovnik for filming. New locations in Croatia include Diocletian's Palace in Split, Klis Fortress north of Split, Perun quarry east of Split, Mosor mountain, and Baška Voda further down to the south. In the commentary for episode 2, "The Lion and the Rose," the showrunners revealed that parts of Joffrey's death scene had been filmed in California. The Thingvellir National Park in Iceland was used as the location for the fight between Brienne and The Hound, and the Þórufoss waterfall was the background for Drogon's attack on a herd of goats in episode 6.

Filming for the season lasted 136 days and was completed on November 21, 2013.

=== Music ===
The Icelandic post-rock band Sigur Rós appears in the second episode, as a group of musicians serenading the royal couple at their wedding reception with "The Rains of Castamere." This continues the series's tradition of employing noted indie bands, begun in season 2 with The National and continued in season 3 with The Hold Steady.

The soundtrack for the season was released digitally on June 10, 2014, and on CD on July 1, 2014.

== Reception ==
=== Critical response ===
Game of Thrones season 4: Critical reception by episode
Season 4 (2014): Percentage of positive critics' reviews tracked by the website Rotten Tomatoes

The review aggregator website Metacritic gave season 4 a score of 94 out of 100 based on 29 reviews, signifying "universal acclaim". On Rotten Tomatoes, the fourth season has a 97% approval rating from 571 critics with an average rating of 9.05 out of 10. The site's critical consensus reads, "Game of Thrones continues to be one of the best shows on TV, combining meticulously-plotted character arcs with the spectacular design of the Seven Kingdoms."

Variety praised the "spectacular cast" and "the sweeping and diverse backdrops" of the season, while Andy Greenwald of Grantland specifically highlighted its "stately pace". Newsday gave it a score of 'A+' and stated that it was "still TV's best -- dive in while the water's warm. Winter is coming, after all." Slant Magazine gave the season 3.5 out of 4 and stated, "Season four feels entirely liberated from the show's own extensive mythology and now moves with thrilling fury and purpose." The Hollywood Reporter gave the season a positive review and stated, "The consistent excellence in Game of Thrones is truly something to behold." The emotional weight, action sequences, performances, visual storytelling and narrative payoff was praised by James Poniewozik of Time and Hank Stuever of The Washington Post.

The A.V. Club gave it a score of 'A−' and stated, "Game Of Thrones was and is an astonishing achievement-a vast web of world-building and map-reading and politicking in made-up languages, while still relying on the close-up camera shot of a single actor's face to draw the most drama out of a scene." Maureen Ryan of HuffPost gave the season a positive review and stated, "To me, the excitement of Game of Thrones, and the hope, exists in the margins, where the smartest characters often lurk." TheWrap termed it a "gorgeous spectacle" and said that "aside from the Star Wars saga, I can't think of any on-screen story that creates such a vast, believable world out of imagination." RogerEbert.com stated that it was "one of the best shows of the last several years feels as creatively vital as ever."

The Boston Globe praised the actors, who "rise to that challenge, whether playing opposite one person or a multitude of extras." USA Today gave the season a positive review and stated, "HBO's lavishly and expertly produced fantasy returns with a lightning-fast opener that skillfully, sometimes amusingly, and eventually violently resets the characters, putting them in place for the season to come." The New York Times praised "its 78 subplots (rough estimate)" that "tend to unfold along user-friendly genre lines." Empire gave the season 5 out of 5 and stated that "HBO's hard-R fantasy series continues to be must-see TV."

The only major publication to give the season a negative review was IndieWire, who gave it a score of 'C+' and stated, "Game of Thrones is a slog through fluctuating politics and random instances of gore with only brief moments of true excitement, when you can distinguish good from evil."

The episodes "The Lion and the Rose", "The Laws of Gods and Men", "The Mountain and the Viper" and "The Children" in particular were singled out as being among the best episodes of the series. However, the third episode attracted criticism for the inclusion of a scene in which Jaime Lannister appears to be raping his sister and lover Cersei in the Great Sept of Baelor. In the source novel, Cersei verbally consents to the sexual encounter, but does not in the television portrayal. The final episode was also criticized for the omission of the events of the epilogue of A Storm of Swords which was expected by fans to be the final scene.

=== Ratings ===
Season 4 obtained the strongest viewer numbers of all seasons aired up until that point, with a series high of 7.20 million viewers of the first airing of the seventh episode. With its fourth season, Game of Thrones has become the most-watched HBO series in history (surpassing the fourth season of The Sopranos which had a gross audience of 18.2 million viewers), averaging 18.4 million viewers across multiple platforms, including live viewing, encores, DVR views, HBO GO and On Demand views.

=== Accolades ===
For the 30th TCA Awards, the series was nominated for Outstanding Achievement in Drama and Program of the Year. For the 4th Critics' Choice Television Awards, the series was nominated for Best Drama Series and Diana Rigg received a nomination for Best Guest Performer in a Drama Series. For the 66th Primetime Emmy Awards, the series received 19 nominations, including Outstanding Drama Series, Peter Dinklage for Outstanding Supporting Actor in a Drama Series, Lena Headey for Outstanding Supporting Actress in a Drama Series, Diana Rigg for Outstanding Guest Actress in a Drama Series, David Benioff and D. B. Weiss for Outstanding Writing for a Drama Series for "The Children", and Neil Marshall for Outstanding Directing for a Drama Series for "The Watchers on the Wall". For the 67th Writers Guild of America Awards, the series was nominated for Best Drama Series and George R. R. Martin was nominated for Best Episodic Drama for "The Lion and the Rose". For the 21st Screen Actors Guild Awards, the cast was nominated for Best Drama Ensemble, Peter Dinklage was nominated for Best Drama Actor, and the series won for Best Stunt Team. For the 72nd Golden Globe Awards, the series was nominated for Best Television Series – Drama. For the 67th Directors Guild of America Awards, Alex Graves was nominated for Outstanding Directing – Drama Series for the episode "The Children".

| Year | Award | Category | Nominee(s) | Result | Ref. |
|---|---|---|---|---|---|
| 2014 | AFI Awards | AFI TV Award | Game of Thrones | Won | |
| 2014 | TV Choice Awards | Best International Show | Game of Thrones | Won | |
| 2014 | Young Hollywood Awards | We Love to Hate You | Jack Gleeson | Nominated | |
| 2014 | Young Hollywood Awards | Bingeworthy TV Show | Game of Thrones | Nominated | |
| 2014 | Artios Awards | Outstanding Achievement in Casting – Television Series Drama | Nina Gold | Nominated | |
| 2014 | EWwy Award | Best Supporting Actress, Drama | Maisie Williams | Won | |
| 2014 | EWwy Award | Best Supporting Actor, Drama | Charles Dance | Nominated | |
| 2014 | EWwy Award | Best Guest Actor, Drama | Pedro Pascal | Won | |
| 2014 | 66th Primetime Emmy Awards | Outstanding Directing for a Drama Series | Neil Marshall for "The Watchers on the Wall" | Nominated | |
| 2014 | 66th Primetime Emmy Awards | Outstanding Drama Series | "The Lion and the Rose", "Breaker of Chains", "First of His Name", "The Laws of Gods and Men", "The Watchers on the Wall", and "The Children" | Nominated | |
| 2014 | 66th Primetime Emmy Awards | Outstanding Supporting Actor in a Drama Series | Peter Dinklage | Nominated | |
| 2014 | 66th Primetime Emmy Awards | Outstanding Supporting Actress in a Drama Series | Lena Headey | Nominated | |
| 2014 | 66th Primetime Emmy Awards | Outstanding Writing for a Drama Series | David Benioff and D. B. Weiss for "The Children" | Nominated | |
| 2014 | 66th Primetime Creative Arts Emmy Awards | Outstanding Art Direction for a Single-Camera Fantasy Series | Deborah Riley, Paul Ghirardani, and Rob Cameron for "The Laws of Gods and Men" and "The Mountain and the Viper" | Won | |
| 2014 | 66th Primetime Creative Arts Emmy Awards | Outstanding Casting for a Drama Series | Nina Gold and Robert Sterne | Nominated | |
| 2014 | 66th Primetime Creative Arts Emmy Awards | Outstanding Cinematography for a Single-Camera Series | Anette Haellmigk for "The Lion and the Rose" | Nominated | |
| 2014 | 66th Primetime Creative Arts Emmy Awards | Outstanding Cinematography for a Single-Camera Series | Jonathan Freeman for "Two Swords" | Nominated | |
| 2014 | 66th Primetime Creative Arts Emmy Awards | Outstanding Costumes for a Series | Michele Clapton, Sheena Wichary, Alexander Fordham, and Nina Ayres for "The Lion and the Rose" | Won | |
| 2014 | 66th Primetime Creative Arts Emmy Awards | Outstanding Guest Actress in a Drama Series | Diana Rigg | Nominated | |
| 2014 | 66th Primetime Creative Arts Emmy Awards | Outstanding Hairstyling for a Single-Camera Series | Kevin Alexander, Candice Banks, Rosalia Culora, Gary Machin, and Nicola Mount for "The Lion and the Rose" | Nominated | |
| 2014 | 66th Primetime Creative Arts Emmy Awards | Outstanding Interactive Program | Game of Thrones Premiere – Facebook Live and Instagram, by Sabrina Caluori, Paul Beddoe-Stephens, Jim Marsh, Michael McMorrow, Michael McMillian | Nominated | |
| 2014 | 66th Primetime Creative Arts Emmy Awards | Outstanding Makeup for a Single-Camera Series (Non-Prosthetic) | Jane Walker and Ann McEwan for "Oathkeeper" | Nominated | |
| 2014 | 66th Primetime Creative Arts Emmy Awards | Outstanding Music Composition for a Series (Original Dramatic Score) | Ramin Djawadi for "The Mountain and the Viper" | Nominated | |
| 2014 | 66th Primetime Creative Arts Emmy Awards | Outstanding Prosthetic Makeup for a Series | Jane Walker and Barrie Gower for "The Children" | Won | |
| 2014 | 66th Primetime Creative Arts Emmy Awards | Outstanding Sound Editing for a Series | Tim Kimmel, Jed M. Dodge, Tim Hands, Paula Fairfield, David Klotz, Bradley C. Katona, Brett Voss, Jeffrey Wilhoit, and Dylan T. Wilhoit for "The Watchers on the Wall" | Nominated | |
| 2014 | 66th Primetime Creative Arts Emmy Awards | Outstanding Sound Mixing for a Drama Series (One Hour) | Ronan Hill, Richard Dyer, Onnalee Blank, and Mathew Waters for "The Watchers on the Wall" | Nominated | |
| 2014 | 66th Primetime Creative Arts Emmy Awards | Outstanding Special and Visual Effects | Joe Bauer, Joern Grosshans, Steve Kullback, Adam Chazen, Eric Carney, Sabrina Gerhardt, Matthew Rouleau, Thomas H. Schelesny, and Robert Simon for "The Children" | Won | |
| 2014 | 66th Primetime Creative Arts Emmy Awards | Outstanding Stunt Coordination for a Drama Series | Paul Herbert | Nominated | |
| 2014 | Women's Image Network Awards | Actress Drama Series | Lena Headey | Won | |
| 2014 | 19th Satellite Awards | Best Supporting Actor – Series, Miniseries or Television Film | Peter Dinklage | Nominated | |
| 2014 | 19th Satellite Awards | Best Television Series – Genre | Game of Thrones | Nominated | |
| 2014 | 4th Critics' Choice Television Awards | Best Drama Series | Game of Thrones | Nominated | |
| 2014 | 4th Critics' Choice Television Awards | Best Guest Performer in a Drama Series | Diana Rigg | Nominated | |
| 2014 | 30th TCA Awards | Outstanding Achievement in Drama | Game of Thrones | Nominated | |
| 2014 | 30th TCA Awards | Program of the Year | Game of Thrones | Nominated | |
| 2014 | Gold Derby TV Awards 2014 | Best Drama Series | Game of Thrones | Nominated | |
| 2014 | Gold Derby TV Awards 2014 | Best Drama Supporting Actor | Peter Dinklage | Nominated | |
| 2014 | Gold Derby TV Awards 2014 | Best Drama Supporting Actor | Charles Dance | Nominated | |
| 2014 | Gold Derby TV Awards 2014 | Best Drama Supporting Actress | Emilia Clarke | Nominated | |
| 2014 | Gold Derby TV Awards 2014 | Best Drama Supporting Actress | Lena Headey | Nominated | |
| 2014 | Gold Derby TV Awards 2014 | Best Drama Guest Actor | Pedro Pascal | Won | |
| 2014 | Gold Derby TV Awards 2014 | Best Drama Guest Actress | Diana Rigg | Nominated | |
| 2014 | Gold Derby TV Awards 2014 | Best Drama Episode | "The Lion and the Rose" | Nominated | |
| 2014 | Gold Derby TV Awards 2014 | Best Drama Episode | "The Watchers on the Wall" | Nominated | |
| 2014 | Gold Derby TV Awards 2014 | Ensemble of the Year | The cast of Game of Thrones | Nominated | |
| 2014 | Hollywood Music in Media Awards | Best Original Score - TV Show/Digital Streaming Series | Ramin Djawadi | Nominated | |
| 2014 | Hollywood Professional Alliance | Outstanding Sound | Tim Kimmel, Onnalee Blank, Mathew Waters, Paula Fairfield, Brad Katona and Jed M. Dodge for "The Children" | Nominated | |
| 2014 | Hollywood Professional Alliance | Outstanding Color Grading | Joe Finley for "Mockingbird" | Nominated | |
| 2014 | Hollywood Professional Alliance | Outstanding Visual Effects | Joe Bauer, Sven Martin, Jörn Grosshans, Thomas Schelesny, Matthew Rouleau for "The Children" | Won | |
| 2014 | IGN Awards | Best TV Episode | "The Children" | Nominated | |
| 2014 | IGN Awards | Best TV Series | Game of Thrones | Nominated | |
| 2014 | IGN Awards | Best TV Drama Series | Game of Thrones | Won | |
| 2014 | IGN People's Choice Award | Best TV Drama Series | Game of Thrones | Won | |
| 2014 | IGN People's Choice Award | Best TV Episode | "The Children" | Nominated | |
| 2014 | IGN People's Choice Award | Best TV Series | Game of Thrones | Nominated | |
| 2014 | Jupiter Award | Best International TV Series | Game of Thrones | Won | |
| 2014 | 1st MTV Fandom Awards | OMG Moment of the Year | Game of Thrones - The Purple Wedding | Won | |
| 2015 | Guinness World Records | Most pirated TV program | Game of Thrones | Won | |
| 2015 | People's Choice Awards | Favorite TV Show | Game of Thrones | Nominated | |
| 2015 | People's Choice Awards | Favorite Cable Sci-Fi/Fantasy TV Show | Game of Thrones | Nominated | |
| 2015 | ADG Excellence in Production Design Award | One-Hour Single Camera Fantasy Television Series | Deborah Riley for "The Laws of Gods and Men" and "The Mountain and the Viper" | Won | |
| 2015 | Cinema Audio Society Awards | Outstanding Achievement in Sound Mixing – Television Series – One Hour | Ronan Hill, Richard Dyer, Onnalee Blank, Mathew Waters, Brett Voss for "The Children" | Won | |
| 2015 | Canadian Society of Cinematographers | TV series Cinematography | Robert McLachlan for "Oathkeeper" | Nominated | |
| 2015 | 12th Irish Film & Television Awards | Best Television Drama | Game of Thrones | Nominated | |
| 2015 | 12th Irish Film & Television Awards | Actor in a Supporting Role – Television | Liam Cunningham | Nominated | |
| 2015 | 12th Irish Film & Television Awards | Best Sound | Game of Thrones | Nominated | |
| 2015 | SFX Awards | Best Actress | Maisie Williams | Nominated | |
| 2015 | SFX Awards | Best Actor | Peter Dinklage | Nominated | |
| 2015 | SFX Awards | Best Villain | Charles Dance as Tywin Lannister | Nominated | |
| 2015 | SFX Awards | Biggest Disappointment | No Hodor in Game Of Thrones season five | Nominated | |
| 2015 | SFX Awards | Best TV Show | Game of Thrones | Nominated | |
| 2015 | SFX Awards | Best TV Episode | The Mountain and the Viper | Nominated | |
| 2015 | Screenwriters Choice Awards | Best Television Drama | Game of Thrones | Nominated | |
| 2015 | NewNowNext Awards | Best New Television Actor | Pedro Pascal | Nominated | |
| 2015 | Astra Awards | Favourite Program – International Drama | Game of Thrones | Won | |
| 2015 | American Society of Cinematographers | Outstanding Achievement in Cinematography in Regular Series | Anette Haellmigk for "The Children" | Nominated | |
| 2015 | American Society of Cinematographers | Outstanding Achievement in Cinematography in Regular Series | Fabian Wagner for "Mockingbird" | Nominated | |
| 2015 | 20th Empire Awards | Hero Award | The cast of Game of Thrones | Won | |
| 2015 | British Academy Television Awards | Radio Times Audience Award | Game of Thrones | Nominated | |
| 2015 | Costume Designers Guild Awards | Outstanding Period/Fantasy Television Series | Michele Clapton for Game of Thrones | Won | |
| 2015 | Directors Guild of America Award | Dramatic Series | Alex Graves for "The Children" | Nominated | |
| 2015 | GLAAD Media Award | Outstanding Drama Series | Game of Thrones | Nominated | |
| 2015 | Golden Reel Award | Best Sound Editing in Television, Short Form: FX/Foley | Game of Thrones for "The Children" | Won | |
| 2015 | Golden Reel Award | Best Sound Editing in Television, Short Form: Dialogue / ADR | Game of Thrones for "The Children" | Nominated | |
| 2015 | Golden Reel Award | Best Sound Editing in Television, Short Form: Music | Game of Thrones for "The Watchers on the Wall" | Nominated | |
| 2015 | 72nd Golden Globe Awards | Best Television Series – Drama | Game of Thrones | Nominated | |
| 2015 | Hugo Awards | Best Dramatic Presentation, Short Form | David Benioff, Alex Graves, and D. B. Weiss for "The Mountain and The Viper" | Nominated | |
| 2015 | National Television Awards | Multichannel show | Game of Thrones | Nominated | |
| 2015 | Producers Guild Awards | "The Norman Felton Award for Outstanding Producer of Episodic Television, Drama" | David Benioff, Bernadette Caulfield, Frank Doelger, Chris Newman, Greg Spence, Carolyn Strauss, D. B. Weiss | Nominated | |
| 2015 | Saturn Award | Best Limited Run Television Series | Game of Thrones | Won | |
| 2015 | Saturn Award | Best Performance by a Younger Actor on Television | Maisie Williams | Won | |
| 2015 | Saturn Award | Best Supporting Actress on Television | Emilia Clarke | Nominated | |
| 2015 | 21st Screen Actors Guild Awards | Outstanding Action Performance by a Stunt Ensemble in a Drama Series | Lucy Allen, Cole Armitage, Gary Arthurs, Rachelle Beinart, Ferenc Berecz, Richard Bradshaw, Andy Butcher, Michael Byrch, Neil Chapelhow, Nick Chopping, Jonathan Cohen, Joel Conlan, Gary Connery, James Cox, Tom Cox, Jason Curle, Nicholas Daines, Bill Davey, Kelly J. Dent, Ben Dimmock, Levan Doran, Jamie Edgell, Bradley Farmer, Neil Finnighan, Jozsef Fodor, Dean Forster, David Garrick, James Grogan, Tim Halloran, Paul Heasman, Robert Hladik, Al Holland, Gergely Horpacsi, Paul Howell, Stewart James, Gary Kane, Ian Kay, Robbie Keane, George Kirby, Cristian Knight, Laszlo Kosa, Geza Kovacs, Norbert Kovacs, Guy List, Phil Lonergan, Russell Macleod, Tina Maskell, Adrian McGaw, Nick McKinless, Erol Mehmet, Andy Merchant, Sian Milne, Daniel Naprous, Chris Newton, Ray Nicholas, Bela Orsanyi, Sam Parham, Ian Pead, Justin Pearson, Martin Pemberton, Heather Phillips, Rashid Phoenix, Andy Pilgrim, Christopher Pocock, Curtis Rivers, Marcus Shakesheff, Matt Sherren, Anthony Skrimshire, Mark Slaughter, Karen Smithson, Mark Southworth, Helen Steinway Bailey, Shane Steyn, Matthew Stirling, John Street, Gaspar Szabo, Gabor Szeman, Roy Taylor, Gyula Toth, Tony Van Silva, Reg Wayment, Linda Weal, Richard J Wheeldon, Heron White, Maxine Whittaker, Simon Whyman, Donna C. Williams, Lou Wong, Annabel E. Wood, Liang Yang, Steen Young | Won | |
| 2015 | 21st Screen Actors Guild Awards | Outstanding Performance by An Ensemble in a Drama Series | Josef Altin, Jacob Anderson, John Bradley, Dominic Carter, Gwendoline Christie, Emilia Clarke, Nikolaj Coster-Waldau, Ben Crompton, Charles Dance, Peter Dinklage, Natalie Dormer, Iain Glen, Julian Glover, Kit Harington, Lena Headey, Conleth Hill, Rory McCann, Ian McElhinney, Pedro Pascal, Daniel Portman, Mark Stanley, Sophie Turner, and Maisie Williams | Nominated | |
| 2015 | 21st Screen Actors Guild Awards | Outstanding Performance by a Male Actor in a Drama Series | Peter Dinklage | Nominated | |
| 2015 | Visual Effects Society | Outstanding Performance of an Animated Character in a Commercial, Broadcast Program, or Video Game | Philip Meyer, Thomas Kutschera, Igor Majdandzic, and Mark Spindler for "Drogon" | Nominated | |
| 2015 | Visual Effects Society | Outstanding Visual Effects in a Visual Effects-Driven Photoreal/Live Action Broadcast Program | Game of Thrones for "The Children" | Won | |
| 2015 | Visual Effects Society | Outstanding Created Environment in a Commercial, Broadcast Program, or Video Game | Rene Borst, Christian Zilliken, Jan Burda, Steffen Metzner for "Braavos Establisher" | Won | |
| 2015 | Visual Effects Society | Outstanding Compositing in a Photoreal/Live Action Broadcast Program | Keegan Douglas, Okan Ataman, Brian Fortune, David Lopez for "Wight Attack" | Nominated | |
| 2015 | Visual Effects Society | Outstanding Compositing in a Photoreal/Live Action Broadcast Program | Dan Breckwoldt, Martin Furman, Sophie Marfleet, Eric Andrusyszyn for "The Watchers on the Wall" | Won | |
| 2015 | Writers Guild of America Awards | Episodic Drama | George R. R. Martin for "The Lion and the Rose" | Nominated | |
| 2015 | Writers Guild of America Awards | Television Drama Series | David Benioff, Bryan Cogman, George R. R. Martin, D. B. Weiss | Nominated | |

== Release ==
=== Home media ===
The fourth season of Game of Thrones was released on DVD and Blu-ray in region 1 on February 17, 2015.

Game of Thrones: The Complete Fourth Season
| Set details | Special features | |
| Format: AC-3, Blu-ray, DTS Surround Sound, Dubbed, NTSC, Subtitled, Widescreen; Language: English, French, Castilian, Spanish, Chechen, Hungarian, Polish; Subtitles: English, French, Dutch, Danish, Finnish, Norwegian, Swedish, German; 16:9 aspect ratio; 5-disc set, 10 episodes | "Behind the Battle for the Wall": Follow the cast and crew as they create the most ambitious battle to date. This 30-minute documentary explores the challenges of putting together one of the series' most intense episodes, with never-before-seen material.; "The Fallen: A Roundtable": Writer Bryan Cogman sits down with a few of the many cast members who meet their demise in Season 4. From first learning of their deaths to shooting their final scenes, this 30-minute feature will shed light on what it's like to live-and die-in the Game of Thrones world.; "The Politics of Power": A Look Back at Season 3 - Revisit the brutal events of Season 3 to see power shifts that define Westeros at the start of Season 4.; "Bastards of Westeros": Hear showrunners David Benioff & D. B. Weiss and author George R. R. Martin discuss the role bastards play in the Seven Kingdoms.; Deleted/Extended Scenes: Two deleted scenes.; Audio commentaries by, among others, Benioff, Weiss, Martin, Turner, Williams, Pascal, Gillen and more.; Blu-ray exclusive: "In-Episode Guide": In-feature resource that provides background information about on-screen characters, locations and relevant histories.; "Histories & Lore": Learn about the mythology of Westeros as told from the varying perspectives of the characters themselves. | |
DVD release dates
| Region 1 | Region 2 | Region 4 |
| February 17, 2015 | February 16, 2015 | February 18, 2015 |

=== IMAX ===
Between January 30 and February 5, 2015, the last two episodes of season four were shown in 205 IMAX theaters in the U.S. Game of Thrones is the first TV series released in this format. The show earned $686,000 in its opening day at the box office and $1.5 million during its opening weekend. The one-week release grossed $1,896,092.

=== Copyright infringement ===
The fourth season of Game of Thrones was the most-pirated TV series in 2014.
