= The Mountain and the Viper =

- Game of Thrones episode
- Gregor "The Mountain" Clegane (left) and Oberyn "the Viper" Martell (right) engage in a trial by combat. This scene was acclaimed by critics.
- Episode no.: Season 4 Episode 8
- Directed by: Alex Graves
- Written by: David Benioff; D. B. Weiss
- Cinematography by: Anette Haellmigk
- Editing by: Tim Porter
- Original air date: June 1, 2014
- Running time: 52 minutes

Guest appearances
- Pedro Pascal as Oberyn Martell; Indira Varma as Ellaria Sand; Michael McElhatton as Roose Bolton; Ian McElhinney as Ser Barristan Selmy; Julian Glover as Grand Maester Pycelle; Roger Ashton-Griffiths as Mace Tyrell; Yuri Kolokolnikov as Styr; Jacob Anderson as Grey Worm; Nathalie Emmanuel as Missandei; Mark Stanley as Grenn; Ben Crompton as Edd Tollett; Josef Altin as Pypar; Paola Dionisotti as Anya Waynwood; Rupert Vansittart as Yohn Royce; Hafþór Júlíus Björnsson as Gregor Clegane; Grahame Fox as Ralf Kenning; Lino Facioli as Robin Arryn; Alisdair Simpson as Donnel Waynwood; Richard Doubleday as Vance Corbray

Episode chronology
← Previous "Mockingbird"	Next → "The Watchers on the Wall"
- Game of Thrones season 4

"The Mountain and the Viper" is the eighth episode of the fourth season of HBO's medieval fantasy television series Game of Thrones. The 38th episode overall, it was written by series co-creators David Benioff and D. B. Weiss, and directed by Alex Graves. It first aired on HBO on June 1, 2014.

In the episode, Mole's Town is attacked by wildlings, but Gilly is spared by Ygritte; Theon Greyjoy negotiates with the remaining ironborn at Moat Cailin; Roose Bolton legitimizes his bastard son Ramsay; Petyr "Littlefinger" Baelish is interrogated by the Lords of the Vale following Lysa Arryn's death; Sandor Clegane and Arya Stark arrive at the Eyrie; Jorah Mormont admits to Daenerys Targaryen that he spied on her for Robert Baratheon years earlier, and is banished from Meereen; and Tyrion Lannister's trial by combat takes place in King's Landing. The title refers to Tyrion's trial by combat, a duel between Gregor "The Mountain" Clegane and Oberyn "The Viper" Martell.

The episode achieved a viewership of 7.17 million in the United States during its initial broadcast, and received positive reviews from critics, who gave heavy praise to the climactic duel sequence in particular. At the Primetime Creative Arts Emmy Awards in 2014, the episode was nominated for Outstanding Music Composition (Original Dramatic Score), and won the award for Outstanding Production Design in a Single-Camera Fantasy Series (sharing with "The Laws of Gods and Men").

This episode marks the final appearance of Pedro Pascal (Oberyn Martell).

== Plot ==
=== At the Wall ===
Mole's Town is attacked by the wildlings, but Ygritte spares Gilly and her son. When news reaches Castle Black, Sam fears for Gilly but the others reassure him that she has survived worse and may still be alive.

=== At Moat Cailin ===
Reek, assuming his previous identity as Theon, enters Moat Cailin and convinces the occupying ironborn to surrender in return for safe passage home. However, Ramsay has the ironborn garrison flayed instead. As a reward for retaking the fort, Roose presents Ramsay with a decree of legitimization. The Boltons depart for their new seat at Winterfell.

=== In Meereen ===
Missandei notices Grey Worm watching her bathe, and he later apologizes. She asks if he remembers his castration, saying that it was a horrible thing to do to a boy. Grey Worm responds that if he had not become an Unsullied, they would have never met. Meanwhile, Barristan receives a letter with the Hand of the King's seal. Inside is Jorah's royal pardon from Robert Baratheon for spying on Daenerys. Jorah is forced to admit his duplicity and Daenerys exiles him from Meereen.

=== In the Vale ===
Petyr is interrogated about Lysa's death by the nobility of the Vale, who are skeptical that she committed suicide. Sansa is asked to testify; she reveals her identity, corroborates Petyr's story, and convinces the nobles of his innocence. Robin is then instructed to begin his lordship by touring the Vale.

Sandor and Arya arrive at the Bloody Gate, only to be informed of Lysa's death. Arya begins laughing ironically at their situation.

=== In King's Landing ===
Tyrion's trial by combat begins. Oberyn quickly gains the upper hand and fatally stabs Gregor with his poison-laced spear, before demanding he confess to killing Elia. Gregor trips him and, using the last of his strength, confesses to Elia's murder before gouging Oberyn's eyes out and crushing his skull with his hands, killing him instantly. Gregor then collapses from his wounds, and with him victorious, Tywin sentences Tyrion to be executed for Joffrey's murder.

== Production ==
=== Writing ===
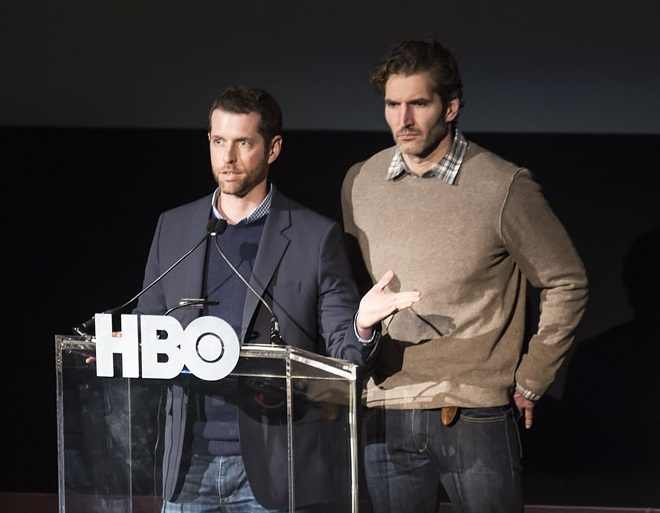
The episode was written by series co-creators David Benioff and D. B. Weiss.

This episode contains content from three of George Martin's novels: A Storm of Swords, chapters Daenerys V, Daenerys VI, Jon VII and Tyrion X; A Feast for Crows, chapters Alayne I and Alayne II; and A Dance with Dragons, chapter Reek II.

== Reception ==
=== Ratings ===
"The Mountain and the Viper" was watched by an estimated 7.17 million people during its first airing. In the United Kingdom, the episode was viewed by 1.811 million viewers, making it the highest-rated broadcast that week. It also received 0.062 million timeshift viewers.

=== Critical reception ===
The episode received high praise from critics and audiences alike, with the fight between Prince Oberyn and the Mountain being hailed as the episode's highlight. On Rotten Tomatoes it obtained a 97% score, based on 32 reviews, with an average rating of 9/10. The website's critical consensus reads, "With one of the most gruesome scenes to date, 'The Mountain and the Viper' delivers a tense, twisty final scene well worth the wait."

Writing for The A.V. Club, Emily VanDerWerff gave the episode an A− and praised the staging of the final fight by director Alex Graves. Erik Adams, also writing for the A.V. Club gave the episode an A. Terri Schwartz, writing for Zap2it.com, wrote the episode was "one of the strongest Game of Thrones episodes to date, and that's just the type of episode that the death of Oberyn Martell deserves."

=== Awards and nominations ===
Year	Award	Category	Nominee(s)	Result
2014	Primetime Creative Arts Emmy Awards	Outstanding Art Direction for a Single-Camera Fantasy Series	Deborah Riley, Paul Ghirardani, and Rob Cameron	Won
2014	Primetime Creative Arts Emmy Awards	Outstanding Music Composition for a Series (Original Dramatic Score)	Ramin Djawadi	Nominated
2015	ADG Excellence in Production Design Award	One-Hour Single Camera Fantasy Television Series	Deborah Riley	Won
2015	SFX Awards	Best TV Episode		Nominated
2015	Hugo Awards	Best Dramatic Presentation, Short Form	David Benioff, Alex Graves, and D. B. Weiss	Nominated
