= Mockingbird (Game of Thrones) =

- Game of Thrones episode
- Episode no.: Season 4 Episode 7
- Directed by: Alik Sakharov
- Written by: David Benioff; D. B. Weiss
- Cinematography by: Fabian Wagner
- Editing by: Tim Porter
- Original air date: May 18, 2014
- Running time: 51 minutes

Guest appearances
- Pedro Pascal as Oberyn Martell; Michiel Huisman as Daario Naharis; Owen Teale as Alliser Thorne; Tara Fitzgerald as Selyse Baratheon; Kate Dickie as Lysa Arryn; Dominic Carter as Janos Slynt; Mark Stanley as Grenn; Ben Crompton as Edd Tollett; Josef Altin as Pypar; Daniel Portman as Podrick Payne; Lino Facioli as Robin Arryn; Brenock O'Connor as Olly; Andy Beckwith as Rorge; Ben Hawkey as Hot Pie; Hafþór Júlíus Björnsson as Gregor Clegane; Brian Fortune as Othell Yarwyck; Gerard Jordan as Biter

Episode chronology
← Previous "The Laws of Gods and Men"	Next → "The Mountain and the Viper"
- Game of Thrones season 4

"Mockingbird" is the seventh episode of the fourth season of HBO's medieval fantasy television series Game of Thrones. The 37th episode of the series overall, "Mockingbird" was written by series co-creators David Benioff and D. B. Weiss, and directed by Alik Sakharov. It first aired on HBO on May 18, 2014.

In the episode, Tyrion Lannister struggles to find a fighter willing to stand as his champion in his upcoming trial by combat; Melisandre and Selyse Baratheon talk on Dragonstone; the Night's Watch continue to prepare for Mance Rayder's attack; Brienne of Tarth and Podrick Payne meet Hot Pie at an inn; Arya Stark and Sandor "The Hound" Clegane are attacked by bandits on the road; Daenerys Targaryen orders Daario to retake Yunkai; and Petyr Baelish assassinates Lysa Arryn. The title refers to the sigil of House Baelish. The episode received positive reviews from critics, mainly praising the suspenseful tone and emotional depth.

This episode marks the final appearance of Kate Dickie (Lysa Arryn).

== Plot ==
=== In King's Landing ===
Jaime tells Tyrion that Cersei has chosen Gregor Clegane as her champion for Tyrion's trial by combat, and declines to be Tyrion's champion due to his poor performance with his left hand. Tyrion sends for Bronn, who tells him that Cersei has offered him a highborn bride and also declines to be Tyrion's champion. Oberyn comes to visit Tyrion; after recounting how he met him as a newborn and how Cersei always blamed him for the death of their mother, he tells Tyrion that he will be his champion to avenge the rape and murder of his sister at Clegane's hands.

=== At Castle Black ===
Jon suggests to Thorne to block the passage through the Wall to prevent Rayder's army from coming through, but his request is ridiculed.

=== At Dragonstone ===
Melisandre tells Selyse that the Lord of Light needs Shireen to depart Dragonstone with them.

=== In the Riverlands ===
Brienne and Podrick stop at an inn, where they meet Hot Pie, who tells them about his journey with Arya. They then decide to go to the Vale because Lysa is Sansa's and Arya's last living relative with money.

Arya and Sandor are attacked by two men who were part of the Night's Watch caravan that Arya travelled with, and one of them bites Sandor. After Sandor kills one, Arya kills the other since there is a bounty on Sandor's head for killing Lannister soldiers. Later, Sandor recounts how Gregor had burned him as a child and how his father covered up the incident.

=== In Meereen ===
Daenerys sleeps with Daario after he enters her chambers at night. The next morning, Daenerys tells Jorah that she has ordered Daario to retake Yunkai and kill all the remaining masters. Jorah points out that if Ned Stark had done the same to him, he would not be there to advise her. Daenerys instead orders Jorah to tell Daario to take Hizdahr with him to advise the masters to conform to her rule.

=== At the Eyrie ===
Sansa slaps Robin after he damages her snowcastle of Winterfell. Petyr then kisses Sansa and Lysa sees them. Soon after, Lysa threatens to throw Sansa out the Moon Door. Petyr intervenes and admits that he truly only loved Catelyn and pushes Lysa through the Moon Door.

== Production ==
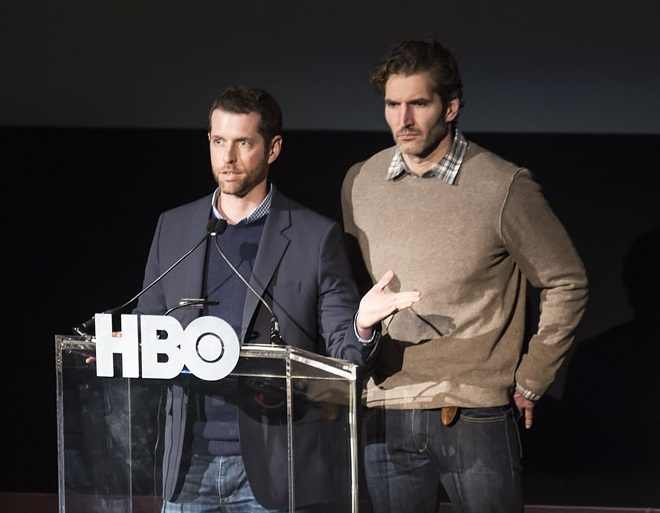
The episode was written by series co-creators David Benioff and D. B. Weiss.

"Mockingbird" adapts part of material from A Storm of Swords, chapters 65, 66 and 80 (Arya XII, Tyrion IX & Sansa VII). It also adapts chapter 20 (Brienne IV) from A Feast for Crows as well as chapter 2 (Daenerys I) from A Dance with Dragons. Additional material comes from Sansa II of A Game of Thrones, Tyrion V of A Storm of Swords and Daenerys VI of A Dance With Dragons.

== Reception ==
=== Ratings ===
The episode achieved a viewership of 7.20 million viewers during its premiere hour, setting a new series high. In the United Kingdom, the episode was viewed by 1.639 million viewers, making it the highest-rated broadcast that week. It also received 0.095 million timeshift viewers.

=== Critical reception ===
"Mockingbird" received critical acclaim.

On the review aggregator website Rotten Tomatoes, 100% of 56 critics' reviews are positive, with an average rating of 9.0/10. The website's consensus reads: "Though 'Mockingbird' mostly sets the table for future events, it remains chock-full of action, suspense, surprise, and raw human emotion."

=== Accolades ===
Year	Award	Category	Nominee(s)	Result
2014	Hollywood Professional Alliance	Outstanding Color Grading	Joe Finley	Nominated
2015	American Society of Cinematographers	Outstanding Achievement in Cinematography in Regular Series	Fabian Wagner	Nominated
