= Breaker of Chains =

- Game of Thrones episode
- Episode no.: Season 4 Episode 3
- Directed by: Alex Graves
- Written by: David Benioff; D. B. Weiss
- Cinematography by: Anette Haellmigk
- Editing by: Katie Weiland
- Original air date: April 20, 2014
- Running time: 56 minutes

Guest appearances
- Diana Rigg as Olenna Tyrell; Pedro Pascal as Oberyn Martell; Indira Varma as Ellaria Sand; Michiel Huisman as Daario Naharis; Peter Vaughan as Maester Aemon; Ian McElhinney as Ser Barristan Selmy; Julian Glover as Grand Maester Pycelle; Owen Teale as Alliser Thorne; Yuri Kolokolnikov as Styr; Dominic Carter as Janos Slynt; Jacob Anderson as Grey Worm; Nathalie Emmanuel as Missandei; Mark Stanley as Grenn; Ben Crompton as Eddison Tollett; Daniel Portman as Podrick Payne; Tony Way as Dontos Hollard; Will Tudor as Olyver; Dean-Charles Chapman as Tommen Baratheon; Josef Altin as Pypar; Ian Beattie as Ser Meryn Trant; Joel Fry as Hizdahr zo Loraq; Finbar Lynch as Farmer; Kerry Ingram as Shireen Baratheon; Brenock O'Connor as Olly; Joseph Gatt as a Thenn warg; Brian Fortune as Othell Yarwyck

Episode chronology
← Previous "The Lion and the Rose"	Next → "Oathkeeper"
- Game of Thrones season 4

"Breaker of Chains" is the third episode of the fourth season of HBO's medieval fantasy television series Game of Thrones. The 33rd episode overall, it was written by series co-creators David Benioff and D. B. Weiss, and directed by Alex Graves. It first aired on HBO on April 20, 2014.

In the episode, Tyrion Lannister is arrested and imprisoned for Joffrey's murder, while Sansa Stark is able to escape King's Landing with Petyr Baelish's help; Tywin Lannister asks Oberyn Martell to sit as a judge on Tyrion's trial. Davos Seaworth contacts the Iron Bank of Braavos. In the North, a wildling raid leaves only one survivor, who turns to the Night's Watch for help. Across the Narrow Sea, Daenerys Targaryen lays siege to the city of Meereen. The episode's title refers to the last scene in the episode where Daenerys catapults broken chains into the city of Meereen, depicting herself as the Breaker of Chains. The episode received critical praise overall, but triggered a public controversy due to a scene that shows Jaime raping Cersei Lannister.

The episode marks the final appearance of Jack Gleeson (Joffrey Baratheon).

== Plot ==
=== In the Narrow Sea ===
Sansa flees with Dontos to a ship. Here, she is greeted by Littlefinger, who has Dontos killed to stop him from revealing his plan. He tells Sansa that the necklace Dontos gave her was fake and part of the plan.

=== In King's Landing ===
In the Sept of Baelor, as Joffrey lies in state, Tywin questions Tommen about the qualities that make a good king. Jaime arrives and Cersei begs him to kill Tyrion, but he refuses. Cersei kisses Jaime but then pushes him away. Jamie grabs her and pushes her to have sex, which she tells him is not right. He ignores her objections and proceeds to rape her.

Tywin suspects that Oberyn had a hand in Joffrey's murder and Oberyn accuses Tywin of ordering the Mountain to murder Elia. Tywin offers to have the Mountain meet with Oberyn in exchange for Oberyn serving as one of the three judges in Tyrion's trial.

Podrick visits Tyrion in his cell. Tyrion asks Podrick to bring Jaime. Podrick reveals that he turned down the offer of a knighthood to testify against Tyrion, and Tyrion orders Podrick to leave King's Landing for his own safety.

=== In the North ===
Fearing for her safety among the 100 men at Castle Black, Sam sends Gilly to shelter in Mole's Town.

The wildlings raid a village and Styr forces a young boy, Olly, to run to Castle Black and tell the Night's Watch what they have done.

Edd Tollett and Grenn return to Castle Black and inform them that Karl's group is living at Craster's Keep. Jon remembers his lie to Mance Rayder about having 1,000 men at the fort and says they must kill Karl's group before Rayder finds out the truth.

=== At Dragonstone ===
Davos learns that Joffrey is dead and is chastised by Stannis for proposing the use of mercenaries. Davos has Shireen write a message to the Iron Bank of Braavos in Stannis' name.

=== In the Riverlands ===
Sandor and Arya continue their journey to the Vale. A farmer invites them to spend the night with him; when Arya wakes, she finds Sandor has beaten and robbed the farmer.

=== Outside Meereen ===
Daenerys' army arrives at Meereen and Daario agrees to fight their champion. After Daario kills the knight, Daenerys addresses Meereen's slaves, declaring that she intends to bring them freedom, using catapults to shoot barrels of broken slave collars as proof.

== Production ==
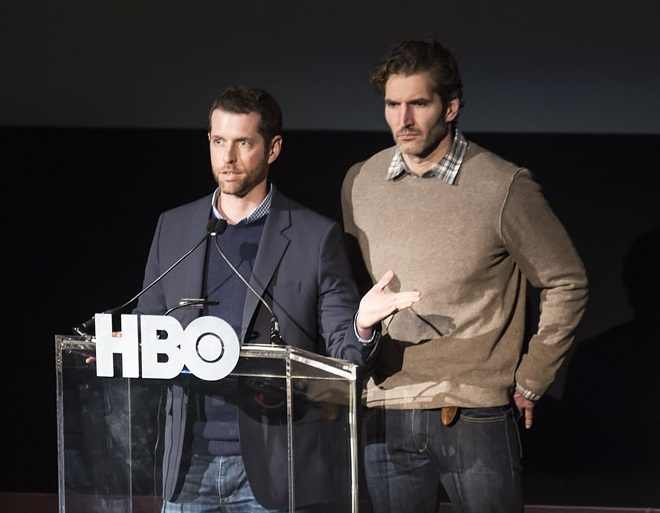
The episode was written by series co-creators David Benioff and D. B. Weiss.

"Breaker of Chains" was written by executive producers David Benioff and D. B. Weiss, based upon the source material, Martin's A Storm of Swords. The controversial Jaime-Cersei scene was adapted from chapter 62 of A Storm of Swords (Jaime VII). Other content came from chapters Sansa V, Tyrion IX and Daenerys V.

Conlanger David Peterson, who created the languages High Valyrian and Dothraki for the show, hid an easter egg in the episode's translations. When the Champion of Meereen is shouting insults at Daenerys in Low Valyrian, the exact words are translated as the same insults the French character was saying in Monty Python and the Holy Grail. The easter egg was Weiss's idea.

== Reception ==
=== Ratings ===
"Breaker of Chains" was watched by an estimated 6.6 million people during the first hour. Another 1.6 million watched it on rerun. In the United Kingdom, the episode was viewed by 1.665 million viewers, making it the highest-rated broadcast that week. It also received 0.099 million timeshift viewers.

=== Critical reception ===
The episode was well received by critics. On review aggregator site Rotten Tomatoes, the episode holds a score of 95% based on 37 reviews, with an average rating of 8.3/10. The site's critical consensus reads: "While 'Breaker of Chains' is a letdown after the Purple Wedding, the episode expertly weaves together a number of necessary plot points -- and still manages to deliver a very memorable scene. Matt Fowler of IGN wrote that the episode deals "with the direct aftermath of King Joffrey's violent demise, though it also [feels] like the most bereft of the first three episodes" and that it "ended with a big, grandiose Daenerys moment – though if one were to compare her launching canisters filled with broken shackles over the walls of Meereen to last year's flambéing of Astapor and stealing off with an entire army (which came at the end of episode 4), this moment lacked 'oomph.'"

==== Sept scene ====
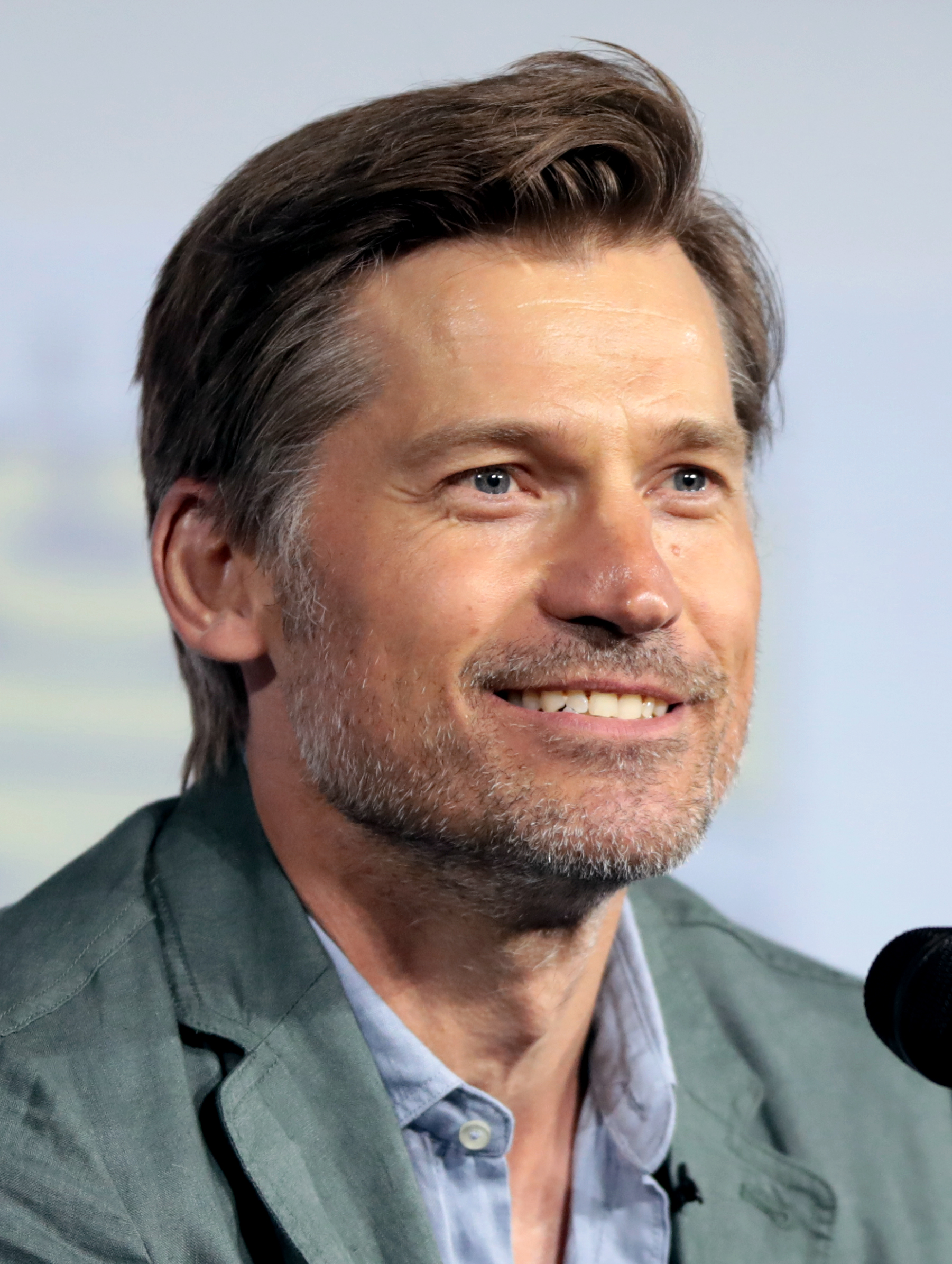
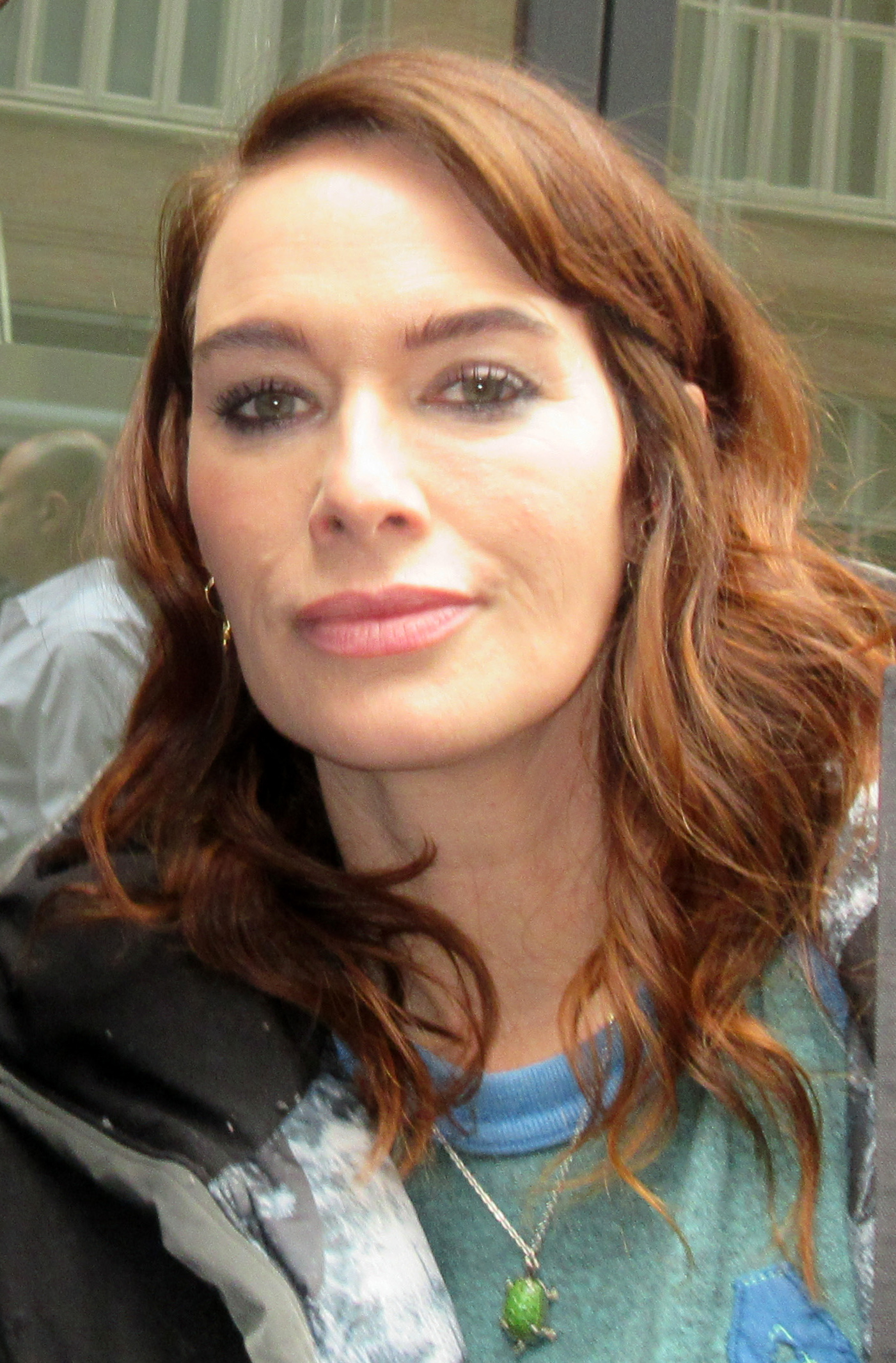
Nikolaj Coster-Waldau (left) and Lena Headey (right) respectively appeared as Jaime and Cersei Lannister in the scene.

The episode attracted controversy for a scene where Jaime Lannister rapes Cersei Lannister in the Great Sept of Baelor. In the episode, Cersei repeatedly tells Jaime "no", "stop", and "it's not right" while attempting to push him away. In the source novel, however, Cersei initially rejects Jaime's advances but changes her mind, saying "yes", though some readers interpret it as implying rape. This controversial scene has led to both fan and academic discourse.

Alan Sepinwall of HitFix stated that viewers interpreted the scene as a rape: "Though there aren't comments on these reviews at the moment, the reaction I've seen on Twitter, in emails and on other blogs suggests nobody is agreeing with [director Alex] Graves' interpretation of the scene and are viewing it as rape, plain and simple." Sandy Hingston of Philadelphia wrote that the scene had outraged many viewers, but had led others to make "tentative attempts in comments sections to explain why maybe actually this wasn't rape." Critics, including Erik Kain of Forbes, Sonia Saraiya of The A.V. Club, Megan Gibson of Time, Amanda Marcotte of Slate, Maureen Ryan of HuffPost, and Alyssa Rosenberg of The Washington Post, also viewed the scene as rape.

The episode's director, Alex Graves, described the scene in an interview with The Hollywood Reporter as "and then Jaime comes in and he rapes her". In another interview with HitFix, Graves said "it becomes consensual by the end, because anything for [Jaime and Cersei] ultimately results in a turn-on, especially a power struggle." In an interview with Vulture, Graves further elaborated: "The consensual part of it was that she wraps her legs around him, and she's holding on to the table, clearly not to escape but to get some grounding in what's going on. And also, the other thing that I think is clear before they hit the ground is she starts to make out with him. ... before he rips her undergarment, she's way into kissing him back." Graves stated that it was important for him and others involved with filming the scene to indicate to viewers that the sexual encounter was not completely one-sided, and that he hoped this aspect would not be overlooked. Noting that during filming, "nobody really wanted to talk about what was going on between the two characters", he described this whole scene in the Sept as "one of my favorite scenes I've ever done".

Others involved with the series also commented on the scene. David Benioff, who co-wrote the episode and serves as showrunner with D. B. Weiss, described the interaction of the two siblings as "a really kind of horrifying scene, because you see, obviously, Joffrey's body right there, and you see that Cersei is resisting this. She's saying no, and he's forcing himself on her. So it was a really uncomfortable scene, and a tricky scene to shoot." George R.R. Martin, author of the novels from which the series is adapted, stated that the dynamic is different between Jaime and Cersei in the show because, as opposed to the books, "Jaime has been back for weeks at the least, maybe longer." He stated that while the setting is the same, "neither character is in the same place as in the books" and that he surmises this "may be why Dan [Weiss] & David [Benioff] played the sept out differently." Martin added that he never discussed the scene with them, and that the scene "was always intended to be disturbing... but [I] regret if it has disturbed people for the wrong reasons." Nikolaj Coster-Waldau, who portrays Jaime, said in an interview that while many saw the scene as a brutal rape, "that was obviously never intended. I understand that one can see it as that, but for us it was much more complex." Lena Headey, who portrays Cersei, declined to comment about whether she interpreted the sex as consensual, but said that "it's a very complicated moment for many reasons ... There was this need and it wasn't right and yet it felt great and yet it wasn't right and it played out the way it did. And I was really happy with [the scene]."

To Saraiya, the series' choice to portray this scene as rape appeared to be an act of "exploitation for shock value". Marcotte and Josh Wigler of MTV commented that the rape scene may have damaged Jaime's character's arc of redemption from his earlier crimes, and Marcotte wrote that it might never recover from the rape. Dustin Rowles of Salon noted that viewers who were previously able to sympathize with Jaime despite his earlier crimes of murder and incest now became angry at the series' creators "for allowing a terrible person to do something more terrible than our minds will allow us to forgive." Andrew Romano of The Daily Beast opined that the scene "wasn't supposed to be a rape. It was supposed to look consensual. The filmmakers messed up." He cited the fact that "neither the director of the scene nor the two actors who played it seem to think that Jaime raped Cersei—and the story itself is continuing to chug along as if the rape never happened and Jaime is still a character we're supposed to root for." He suggested that viewers "ignore the rape—at least from a narrative perspective" because Benioff and Weiss had "botched" it. In a broader context, Hingston credited the episode with furthering "the furious debate over consent going on in our culture". Laura Hudson of Wired described the scene and its appraisal by its director as "one that encourages the most dangerous thinking about rape imaginable: that when a woman is held down on the ground, screaming for the man to stop, that deep down inside her she might still really want it." She considered what she called Graves' lack of realization that he was filming a rape scene disturbing because, according to Hudson, his comments encouraged the thinking that a man's persistence might "'turn' a rape into something consensual", and that it is a "dysfunctional, dangerous way of looking at sex and consent, one that is based on the idea of forcing women to give it".
