= Oathkeeper =

- Game of Thrones episode
- In the episode's final scene, the Night King, played by Richard Brake, appears for the first time.
- Episode no.: Season 4 Episode 4
- Directed by: Michelle MacLaren
- Written by: Bryan Cogman
- Cinematography by: Robert McLachlan
- Editing by: Crispin Green
- Original air date: April 27, 2014
- Running time: 55 minutes

Guest appearances
- Diana Rigg as Olenna Tyrell; Michiel Huisman as Daario Naharis; Ian McElhinney as Ser Barristan Selmy; Owen Teale as Alliser Thorne; Burn Gorman as Karl Tanner; Noah Taylor as Locke; Dominic Carter as Janos Slynt; Nathalie Emmanuel as Missandei; Jacob Anderson as Grey Worm; Thomas Brodie-Sangster as Jojen Reed; Ellie Kendrick as Meera Reed; Kristian Nairn as Hodor; Mark Stanley as Grenn; Ben Crompton as Eddison Tollett; Luke Barnes as Rast; Dean-Charles Chapman as Tommen Baratheon; Daniel Portman as Podrick Payne; Josef Altin as Pypar; Brenock O'Connor as Olly; Richard Brake as the Night King

Episode chronology
| ← Previous "Breaker of Chains" | Next → "First of His Name" |
- Game of Thrones season 4

"Oathkeeper" is the fourth episode of the fourth season of HBO's medieval fantasy television series Game of Thrones. The 34th episode overall, "Oathkeeper" was written by Bryan Cogman and directed by Michelle MacLaren. It first aired on HBO on April 27, 2014.

In the episode, the residents of King's Landing deal with the aftermath of Joffrey Baratheon's murder; Daenerys Targaryen continues her conquest of Meereen; Sansa Stark and Petyr "Littlefinger" Baelish sail in the Narrow Sea; and Alliser Thorne agrees to let Jon Snow take a group of volunteers north of the Wall to eliminate the mutineers at Craster's Keep. The episode's title refers to the new sword gifted to Brienne of Tarth by Jaime Lannister, and the themes of duty that propel the episode.

The episode features the first substantive appearance of the Night King, the leader of the White Walkers—-following a second-long appearance in a vision sequence in two episodes prior (“The Lion and the Rose”) though he was not identified as such until the following year.

"Oathkeeper" received positive reviews from critics, mainly praising the final scene and the storytelling changes from the original source material.

== Plot ==
=== In Meereen ===
Missandei continues to teach Grey Worm the Common Tongue, the language of Westeros. Grey Worm and other Unsullied infiltrate the city, arm the slaves and incite a slave uprising that leaves Daenerys in control of the city. Despite Barristan's suggestion to offer mercy, Daenerys orders 163 masters crucified as justice for the 163 slave children crucified along the road to Meereen.

=== In King's Landing ===
Jaime visits Tyrion in his cell and tells him that Cersei is still searching for Sansa.

Olenna prepares to return to Highgarden and implies to Margaery that she had a hand in Joffrey's death to protect Margaery from his cruelty. She also suggests that Margaery ingratiate herself with Tommen to curtail Cersei's influence; at night, Margaery visits Tommen in his chambers to discuss their marriage.

Jaime sends Brienne to find and protect Sansa and gives her armor and his Valyrian steel sword, which she names "Oathkeeper," and Podrick as her squire.

=== In the Narrow Sea ===
On the way to the Eyrie, Petyr tells Sansa that he plans to marry her aunt Lysa. He tells her that Joffrey's death will help him and his new allies grow strong, referring to House Tyrell, and that the missing stone in her necklace contained the poison used for the murder.

=== At the Wall ===
Slynt convinces Thorne to send Jon to kill the group at Craster's Keep, as Jon may be killed and not become Lord Commander. Jon gathers volunteers to join him, including Locke who arrived as a new recruit.

=== Beyond the Wall ===
A drunken Karl challenges any man who thinks he can kill him. Nobody accepts the challenge. Then Karl orders Rast to give Craster's last son to the White Walkers. Hearing the baby's distant cries, Bran wargs into Summer to investigate but gets the direwolf caught in a trap after finding Ghost. Bran's group is captured by the mutineers when they try to rescue the direwolves. Bran confesses to his identity to save his friends.

A White Walker retrieves Craster's son and brings him to a fortress in the Lands of Always Winter, where their leader, the Night King, transforms the baby into a White Walker.

== Production ==
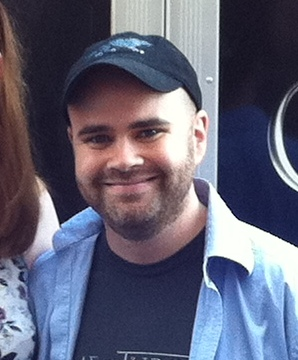
Series veteran Bryan Cogman wrote this episode.

"Oathkeeper" was written by Bryan Cogman based on A Storm of Swords. Reviewer Walt Hickey of FiveThirtyEight notes that the episode "contained the final scene of Jaime Lannister’s ninth "Storm of Swords" chapter. But lots of material from that chapter hasn't been on the show yet, so I reasoned that he has completed only eight." In addition to chapter 72 (Jaime IX), some of the content from this episode is also found in A Storm of Swords chapters 61, 68, and 71 (Sansa V, Sansa VI, Daenerys VI).

Theresa DeLucci, a reviewer for Tor.com, notes that the episode "didn't even take liberties with the books; it completely made up whole new stories" that do not appear in A Storm of Swords, including conversations between Missandei and Grey Worm, Bran's appearance at Craster's keep, and the final White Walker scene. Reviewers from IGN applauded the new material, noting that the scenes at Craster's keep "give Bran something to do" and hint at the nature of the White Walkers. Erik Kain, of Forbes magazine, notes these departures from the books as well, stating that the episode departed as much from the books as any episode thus far in the HBO adaptation of Martin's book series. These deviations, notes Kain, "leave both readers and newcomers to the story of Westeros and its motley band of heroes and villains entirely uncertain as to what's coming next."

== Reception ==
=== Ratings ===
"Oathkeeper" established a new series high in ratings, with 6.95 million people watching the premiere. In the United Kingdom, the episode was viewed by 1.598 million viewers, making it the highest-rated broadcast that week. It also received 0.112 million timeshift viewers.

=== Critical reception ===
Like the season's other episodes, "Oathkeeper" received acclaim from critics, with Rotten Tomatoes counting 97% positive reviews from among 55. The site's consensus reads: "If it's a bit more subdued than its predecessors, 'Oathkeeper' is nonetheless a rock-solid installment of Game of Thrones – one that features assured direction, strong action scenes, and intriguing plot developments."

Eric Goldman and Roth Cornet of IGN commented on the episode being a "game changer" because it diverges from the book series more than any other Game of Thrones episode; a few of the changes include Jon's and Bran's storylines, how Daenerys conquered Meereen, and new information with regard to how White Walkers multiply their army. Goldman and Cornet stated that much of the episode feels like a spoiler for readers of the series because of the changes, including the show creators, who know how the ongoing book series will end, possibly having incorporated aspects that happen later in the books. Though Goldman and Cornet indicated that significantly diverging from the books could be detrimental to the show, they credited "Oathkeeper" with adding an element of surprise and intrigue for all viewers.

Writing for The A.V. Club, Emily St. James (writing for viewers who have read the books) and Erik Adams (writing for viewers who have not) both gave the episode a B. St. James commented that the scenes between Jamie and Cersei "seems to truly want us to think that what happened last week wasn't, in any way, rape" and wondered "whether the show is going to acknowledge it at all." Adams notes how the episode serves as a "bridge" between episodes and plotlines well under way, but that there are "thematic riches" to be found; namely, the multiple searches for justice.

Writing for Esquire, Steven Attewell commented that with the previous episode's rape scene "the showrunners not only shocked the audience, but they also jeopardized its trust in the show in ways that become quite clear in light of last night's episode." Bringing up other reviews and analysis from the AV Club, Slate, Jezebel, and the Washington Post, Attewell states that there "is a huge divergence between how the scene appeared on the screen and our understandings of these two characters, how they interact, and how they are developing as people."

=== Accolades ===
| Year | Award | Category | Nominee(s) | Result | Ref. |
|---|---|---|---|---|---|
| 2014 | 66th Primetime Emmy Awards | Outstanding Makeup for a Single-Camera Series (Non-Prosthetic) | Jane Walker and Ann McEwan | Nominated | |
| 2015 | Canadian Society of Cinematographers | TV series Cinematography | Robert McLachlan | Nominated | |
