= The Children (Game of Thrones) =

- Game of Thrones episode
- Episode no.: Season 4 Episode 10
- Directed by: Alex Graves
- Written by: David Benioff; D. B. Weiss
- Cinematography by: Anette Haellmigk
- Editing by: Tim Porter
- Original air date: June 15, 2014
- Running time: 65 minutes

Guest appearances
- Ciarán Hinds as Mance Rayder; Peter Vaughan as Maester Aemon; Julian Glover as Grand Maester Pycelle; Anton Lesser as Qyburn; Ian McElhinney as Ser Barristan Selmy; Struan Rodger as the Three-Eyed Raven; Thomas Brodie Sangster as Jojen Reed; Ellie Kendrick as Meera Reed; Kristian Nairn as Hodor; Tara Fitzgerald as Selyse Baratheon; Dominic Carter as Janos Slynt; Jacob Anderson as Grey Worm; Nathalie Emmanuel as Missandei; Mark Stanley as Grenn; Ben Crompton as Edd Tollett; Josef Altin as Pypar; Daniel Portman as Podrick Payne; Trevor Allan Davies as Fennesz; Brenock O'Connor as Olly; Kerry Ingram as Shireen Baratheon; Octavia Selena Alexandru as Leaf; Hafþór Júlíus Björnsson as Gregor Clegane; Ian Whyte as Dongo; Gary Oliver as Ternesio Terys

Episode chronology
← Previous "The Watchers on the Wall"	Next → "The Wars to Come"
- Game of Thrones season 4

"The Children" is the tenth and final episode of the fourth season of HBO's medieval fantasy television series Game of Thrones. The 40th episode of the series overall, "The Children" was written by series co-creators David Benioff and D. B. Weiss, and directed by Alex Graves. It first aired on HBO on June 15, 2014.

In the episode, Stannis Baratheon attacks the wildling camp beyond the Wall, as Jon Snow tries to meet with Mance Rayder; Bran Stark meets the Three-Eyed Raven; Qyburn tries to revive Gregor Clegane; Brienne of Tarth and Podrick Payne encounter Arya Stark in the Vale; Daenerys Targaryen is forced to chain her dragons up in the dungeons in Meereen; and Jaime Lannister sets Tyrion Lannister free before Tyrion is to be executed.

"The Children" received acclaim from critics, who largely praised the episode's handling of the deaths of Shae and Tywin Lannister, as well as the scene of Bran reaching the Heart Tree, and the fight scene between Brienne and Sandor "The Hound" Clegane. This episode marks the final appearances of Sibel Kekilli (Shae), Rose Leslie (Ygritte) and Thomas Brodie-Sangster (Jojen Reed).

== Plot ==
=== Beyond the Wall ===
Jon meets Mance Rayder and tells him he wants to negotiate peace terms, but Rayder quickly realizes that Jon intends to kill him. They are interrupted by a massive cavalry charge led by Stannis and Davos that overruns the wildling encampment. Mance surrenders and is taken captive on Jon's suggestion and the bodies of all the dead are burned. A mass cremation is held for the slain brothers of the Night's Watch. At the request of a captured Tormund, Jon later privately cremates Ygritte north of the Wall.

As Bran's group reaches the Heart Tree, they are attacked by skeleton warriors. Jojen is killed, but Hodor, Meera, and Bran are saved by a Child of the Forest. The Child leads them to meet an old man, the "Three Eyed Raven", who tells Bran that, while he will never be able to walk again, he will "fly".

=== In Meereen ===
Daenerys receives a supplicant who wishes to be sold back into slavery because his life as a slave was safer than as a freedman. She allows him to have a temporary contract of service with his former master. The next supplicant is a grieving father carrying the charred bones of his three year-old daughter, who was killed by Drogon. Drogon has not returned, but a guilt-ridden Daenerys chains the other dragons in the catacombs as a precaution.

=== In King's Landing ===
Gregor lies dying from Oberyn's poisoned spear, but Qyburn says that he can save him. Cersei ousts Pycelle from his laboratory and gives his care over to Qyburn. Cersei rebuffs Tywin's insistence to marry Loras and confirms her incest with Jaime to him.

In the dungeons, Tyrion awaits his execution, but Jaime helps him escape. Tyrion, before escaping, sneaks into the Tower of the Hand, where he finds Shae in Tywin's bed. Realizing that Tywin has turned Shae against him, Tyrion remorsefully strangles her to death. He then confronts Tywin as he sits on the privy, and kills him with a crossbow after he repeatedly dismisses his son's feelings and disparages Shae. Tyrion escapes on a ship bound for Essos with help from Varys, who boards with him after Tywin's death is discovered.

=== In the Vale ===
Brienne and Podrick meet Sandor and Arya. Brienne recognizes Arya and explains her oath to Catelyn, but Arya rebuffs her and Sandor is unconvinced of her loyalties. Brienne and Sandor duel, eventually resulting in a brutal fistfight with Brienne knocking Sandor off a cliff and unsuccessfully searching for Arya. After they leave, the gravely wounded Sandor pleads with Arya to kill him, but instead she takes his silver and leaves him to die. She then boards a ship to Braavos after showing the captain the coin Jaqen gave her.

== Production ==
=== Writing ===
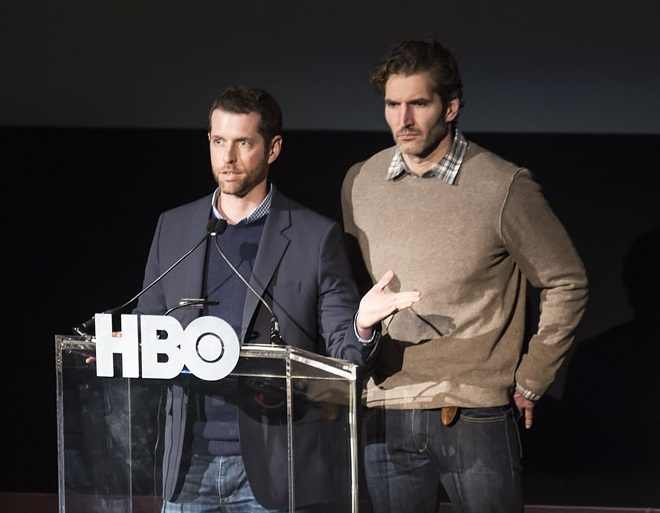
The episode was written by series co-creators David Benioff and D. B. Weiss.

The episode was written by series co-creators David Benioff and D. B. Weiss, This episode contains content from two of George Martin's novels, A Storm of Swords, chapters Jon X, part of Jon XI, Jaime IX, Tyrion XI, and Arya XIII, and A Dance with Dragons, chapters Daenerys I, Daenerys II, part of Tyrion I and Bran II.

=== Filming ===
"The Children" was directed by Alex Graves. The Thingvellir National Park in Iceland was used as the location for the fight between Brienne and The Hound. According to Graves, the skeleton fight scene was an homage to Ray Harryhausen's famous stop motion sequence from Jason and the Argonauts.

== Reception ==
=== Ratings ===
"The Children" was watched by 7.09 million Americans during its premiere hour, a 32% increase from the previous season finale. In the United Kingdom, the episode was viewed by 1.850 million viewers, making it the highest-rated broadcast that week. It also received 0.085 million timeshift viewers.

=== Critical reception ===
The episode received universal acclaim. All 35 reviews on Rotten Tomatoes were positive, with an average score of 9.5 out of 10. The site's consensus reads, "Capping off the best season of Game of Thrones to date, "The Children" provides enough satisfying plot developments for a finale, while its twists and turns leave you wanting more."

IGN writer Matt Fowler called it a "strong seasonal send-off with tons of violent twists, and turns." Sean T. Collins of Rolling Stone wrote, "Sometimes Game of Thrones is a widescreen epic fantasy, other times it's a small-scale study of violent lives. At its best – and "The Children" is certainly this show at its wide and wild best – Game of Thrones is all of these things, simultaneously." TVLine named Rory McCann and Gwendoline Christie the "Performers of the Week" for their physical acting in their fight sequence, and wrote that it "was one of the finest examples of the form in recent TV history – absolutely too epic to ignore."

=== Omission of Lady Stoneheart ===
After the episode premiered, some fans of the novel series voiced their displeasure over the omission of Lady Stoneheart, the resurrected Catelyn Stark from the end of A Storm of Swords. This was in part fueled by a photo posted to Instagram two months earlier by actress Lena Headey that many fans assumed was a confirmation of the character's inclusion in the finale. A day later, director Alex Graves stated that the character was never planned to appear in the fourth season, and that he did not know whether she would appear in the fifth.

In an interview with Entertainment Weekly, actress Michelle Fairley stated that the character may not ever be included in the TV series, though she did not give a definite confirmation either way.

=== Piracy ===
The episode set a BitTorrent record with about 1.5 million downloads within 12 hours and set a record for 250,000 users sharing the file at the same time.

=== Awards and nominations ===
Year	Award	Category	Nominee(s)	Result
2014	Primetime Emmy Awards	Outstanding Writing for a Drama Series	David Benioff and D.B. Weiss	Nominated
2014	Primetime Creative Arts Emmy Awards	Outstanding Prosthetic Makeup for a Series	Jane Walker and Barrie Gower	Won
2014	Primetime Creative Arts Emmy Awards	Outstanding Special and Visual Effects	Joe Bauer, Joern Grosshans, Steve Kullback, Adam Chazen, Eric Carney, Sabrina Gerhardt, Matthew Rouleau, Thomas H. Schelesny, and Robert Simon	Won
2014	Hollywood Professional Alliance	Outstanding Sound	Tim Kimmel, Onnalee Blank, Mathew Waters, Paula Fairfield, Brad Katona and Jed M. Dodge	Nominated
2014	Hollywood Professional Alliance	Outstanding Visual Effects	Joe Bauer, Sven Martin, Jörn Grosshans, Thomas Schelesny and Matthew Rouleau	Won
2014	IGN Awards	Best TV Episode		Nominated
2014	IGN People's Choice Awards	Best TV Episode		Nominated
2015	Cinema Audio Society Awards	Outstanding Achievement in Sound Mixing – Television Series – One Hour	Ronan Hill, Richard Dyer, Onnalee Blank, Mathew Waters, Brett Voss	Won
2015	American Society of Cinematographers	Outstanding Achievement in Cinematography in Regular Series	Anette Haellmigk	Nominated
2015	Directors Guild of America Award	Dramatic Series	Alex Graves	Nominated
2015	Golden Reel Award	Best Sound Editing in Television, Short Form: FX/Foley		Won
2015	Golden Reel Award	Best Sound Editing in Television, Short Form: Dialogue / ADR		Nominated
2015	Visual Effects Society	Outstanding Visual Effects in a Visual Effects-Driven Photoreal/Live Action Broadcast Program		Won
