= First of His Name =

- Game of Thrones episode
- Episode no.: Season 4 Episode 5
- Directed by: Michelle MacLaren
- Written by: David Benioff; D. B. Weiss
- Cinematography by: Robert McLachlan
- Editing by: Crispin Green
- Original air date: May 4, 2014
- Running time: 53 minutes

Guest appearances
- Pedro Pascal as Oberyn Martell; Michiel Huisman as Daario Naharis; Burn Gorman as Karl Tanner; Kate Dickie as Lysa Arryn; Ian McElhinney as Ser Barristan Selmy; Julian Glover as Grand Maester Pycelle; Noah Taylor as Locke; Roger Ashton-Griffiths as Mace Tyrell; Thomas Brodie Sangster as Jojen Reed; Ellie Kendrick as Meera Reed; Nathalie Emmanuel as Missandei; Jacob Anderson as Grey Worm; Dean-Charles Chapman as Tommen Baratheon; Daniel Portman as Podrick Payne; Finn Jones as Loras Tyrell; Kristian Nairn as Hodor; Mark Stanley as Grenn; Ben Crompton as Edd Tollett; Luke Barnes as Rast; Deirdre Monaghan as Morag; Lino Facioli as Robin Arryn; Paul Bentley as the High Septon; Jane McGrath as Sissy; Alisdair Simpson as Donnel Waynwood

Episode chronology
| ← Previous "Oathkeeper" | Next → "The Laws of Gods and Men" |
- Game of Thrones season 4

"First of His Name" is the fifth episode of the fourth season of HBO's medieval fantasy television series Game of Thrones. The 35th episode overall, it was written by series co-creators David Benioff and D. B. Weiss, and directed by Michelle MacLaren. It aired on May 4, 2014.

In the episode, Tommen Baratheon is crowned as the new king of the Seven Kingdoms; Petyr "Littlefinger" Baelish and Sansa Stark arrive at the Eyrie and are welcomed by Lysa Arryn; Daenerys Targaryen decides to stay in Meereen; and Jon Snow leads an attack on the Night's Watch mutineers at Craster's Keep. The title of the episode refers to a phrase used during Tommen Baratheon's coronation, as "King Tommen of the House Baratheon, First of His Name." The episode received critical acclaim, with many praising the scene between Baelish and Lysa which reveals a big moment of the series' story, as well as the climactic battle sequence. It set a new viewership record, where it was seen by 7.16 million viewers during its initial airing in the United States.

== Plot ==
=== In King's Landing ===
Tommen is crowned as king, the first of his name and Cersei decides that he will soon marry Margaery. Tywin tells Cersei that the gold mines in the Westerlands ran dry years ago and that they are deeply indebted to the Iron Bank, but the union of the houses of Lannister and Tyrell will help rectify this problem. Cersei asks Oberyn to send a ship back to Sunspear as a gift for Myrcella.

=== In the Vale ===
Petyr and Sansa arrive in the Vale. At the Bloody Gate, Petyr tells the guards that Sansa is his niece Alayne. Lysa reveals that she poisoned her husband, Jon Arryn, at Petyr's instigation before the two are hurriedly married. Lysa accuses Sansa of sleeping with Petyr, but Sansa promises her aunt that she is a virgin. Lysa calms down before adding that when Tyrion dies, Sansa will marry her son Robin.

=== In Meereen ===
Daario tells Daenerys that his forces have confiscated the 93-ship Meereenese navy. Jorah tells her that Joffrey was murdered at his own wedding, but that both Astapor and Yunkai have reverted to slavery. Daenerys tells Jorah that instead of sailing west, she intends to stay and rule her new people herself.

=== On the Kingsroad ===
As Brienne and Podrick ride north, she is surprised by his lack of outdoor skills, but gains respect for him after hearing he saved Tyrion's life at the Battle of Blackwater.

=== In the Riverlands ===
During her nighttime ritual of reciting her death list, Arya says The Hound’s name in front of him. Arya reveals to the Hound that Syrio was killed by Meryn.

=== Beyond the Wall ===
Jon's group attacks Craster's Keep. Locke covertly tries to kidnap Bran, but Bran enters Hodor's mind and kills Locke. Freed, Bran contemplates reuniting with Jon, but Jojen tells him that Jon will prevent their journey to find the Three-Eyed Raven. Rast attempts to escape but is killed by Ghost. After killing Karl and being reunited with Ghost, Jon burns the keep along with its dead, at the suggestion of Craster's daughter-wives.

== Production ==
=== Writing ===
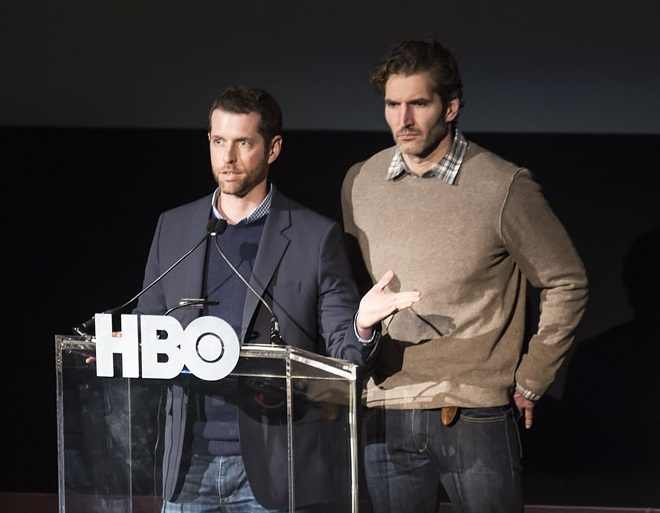
The episode was written by series co-creators David Benioff and D. B. Weiss.

"First of His Name" was written by executive producers David Benioff and D. B. Weiss, based upon the source material, Martin's A Storm of Swords. Chapters adapted from A Storm of Swords to the episode were chapters 68 and 71 (Sansa VI and Daenerys VI). It also covers part of the fourth novel, A Feast for Crows: namely chapter 14 (Brienne III).

=== Casting ===
Kate Dickie (Lysa Arryn) and Lino Facioli (Robin Arryn) make return appearances after an absence of several years (since the first season).

== Reception ==
=== Ratings ===
"First of His Name" established a new series high in ratings, with 7.16 million people watching it during its first airing. In the United Kingdom, the episode was viewed by 1.643 million viewers, making it the highest-rated broadcast that week. It also received 0.082 million timeshift viewers.

=== Critical reception ===
The episode received critical acclaim. Rotten Tomatoes reported that 100% of the episode's 40 reviews on the site were positive with an average score of 8.25 out of 10. Its consensus reads: "Only slow by Game of Thrones standards, "First of His Name" demonstrates how carefully constructed this show has been since season one." Matt Fowler of IGN gave the episode a 9/10 writing that the episode "gave us a much-needed look back at some past events on the series." He highlighted the revelation that Littlefinger's actions "put the story of the entire series into motion." Erik Adams of The A.V. Club gave the episode an A and praised the writers for their focus on the female characters.
