= The Laws of Gods and Men =

- Game of Thrones episode
- Tyrion demanding a trial by combat. Dinklage's performance for this episode was praised by critics.
- Episode no.: Season 4 Episode 6
- Directed by: Alik Sakharov
- Written by: Bryan Cogman
- Cinematography by: Fabian Wagner
- Editing by: Crispin Green
- Original air date: May 11, 2014
- Running time: 50 minutes

Guest appearances
- Pedro Pascal as Oberyn Martell; Julian Glover as Grand Maester Pycelle; Ian McElhinney as Ser Barristan Selmy; Mark Gatiss as Tycho Nestoris; Roger Ashton-Griffiths as Mace Tyrell; Lucian Msamati as Salladhor Saan; Nathalie Emmanuel as Missandei; Jacob Anderson as Grey Worm; Gemma Whelan as Yara Greyjoy; Finn Jones as Loras Tyrell; Dean-Charles Chapman as Tommen Baratheon; Ian Beattie as Ser Meryn Trant; Joel Fry as Hizdahr zo Loraq; Charlotte Hope as Myranda

Episode chronology
← Previous "First of His Name"	Next → "Mockingbird"
- Game of Thrones season 4

"The Laws of Gods and Men" is the sixth episode of the fourth season of HBO's medieval fantasy television series Game of Thrones, and the 36th episode overall. Directed by Alik Sakharov and written by Bryan Cogman, the episode first aired on May 11, 2014.

In the episode, Tyrion Lannister is tried for the murder of King Joffrey Baratheon. Despite his innocence, Tyrion realizes that the odds are stacked against him. At the Dreadfort, Yara Greyjoy attempts a daring rescue of her captive brother, Theon. Across the Narrow Sea, Stannis Baratheon and Davos Seaworth negotiate with the Iron Bank of Braavos, and Daenerys Targaryen faces a moral dilemma while governing Meereen. The episode's title refers to Tyrion's trial, whose outcome is said to be guided by the laws of the realm, and the laws of the gods. The episode achieved a viewership of 6.4 million during its initial airing in the United States.

The episode received widespread acclaim from critics and viewers, who highlighted the scenes of Tyrion's trial and Peter Dinklage's performance in particular. At the 66th Primetime Emmy Awards, the episode won the award for Outstanding Art Direction for a Single-Camera Fantasy Series, and was Dinklage's choice to support his nomination for Outstanding Supporting Actor in a Drama Series.

== Plot ==
=== In Braavos ===
Stannis and Davos arrive in Braavos and meet Tycho Nestoris at the Iron Bank. Initially denying his request, Nestoris is persuaded when Davos mentions that the "true" power of Westeros, Tywin Lannister, is aging and will soon be dead. Davos finds Salladhor Saan, an old pirate friend of his, and informs him that he has the money Saan was promised and they will set sail the next day.

=== In Meereen ===
One of Daenerys' dragons attacks a flock of goats. Their owner presents a bag of their charred bones to Daenerys, who promises to compensate him three times over. Hizdahr zo Loraq requests to bury his father, one of the crucified Meereenese masters. Daenerys is reluctant at first, justifying her actions, but eventually agrees to the burial when she learns Hizdahr's father was a critic of the crucifixion of the slave children.

=== At the Dreadfort ===
Yara and her Ironborn soldiers attack the Dreadfort but Theon refuses her help, having become too psychologically traumatised, believing the rescue to be one of Ramsay's tricks. Ramsay and his men corner the Ironborn, who return to their boats. There, Yara declares that her brother is dead. Later, impressed by Reek's loyalty, Ramsay allows him a bath and asks for his help in retaking Moat Cailin.

=== In King's Landing ===
At the council, Varys tells Tywin of Daenerys' conquest of Meereen. Later, Tyrion's trial begins with Tywin, Mace, and Oberyn as judges. Several hostile witnesses are called, including Meryn, Pycelle, Cersei, and Varys. At recess, Jaime agrees to resign and go to Casterly Rock as heir if Tywin spares Tyrion. Tywin immediately agrees and says that Tyrion will be sent to the Night's Watch after being found guilty and then pardoned, prompting both Jaime and Tyrion to realize that this was Tywin's plan all along. Shae, the final crown witness, falsely testifies that Tyrion and Sansa planned the murder. Tyrion curses his accusers and demands a trial by combat to prove his innocence, causing uproar but a keen interest from Prince Oberyn.

== Production ==
=== Writing ===
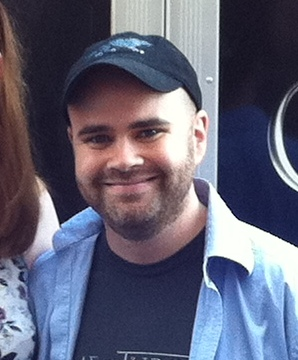
Series veteran Bryan Cogman wrote this episode.

"The Laws of Gods and Men" was written by Bryan Cogman, based upon the source material, Martin's A Storm of Swords. Chapters adapted from A Storm of Swords to the episode were chapters 66 and 70 (Tyrion IX and Tyrion X).

== Reception ==
=== Ratings ===
"The Laws of Gods and Men" was watched by an estimated 6.4 million people during its original broadcast. In the United Kingdom, the episode was viewed by 1.657 million viewers, making it the highest-rated broadcast that week. It also received 0.1 million timeshift viewers.

=== Critical reception ===
The episode received universal acclaim reviews from critics, with most reviewers singling out Tyrion's trial as the highlight of the episode, particularly praising Peter Dinklage's performance.

On the review aggregator website Rotten Tomatoes, 94% of 53 critics' reviews are positive, with an average rating of 9.0/10. The website's consensus reads: "After one of the show's most heartbreaking betrayals, Peter Dinklage gives his best performance of the season." On review aggregator website Metacritic, the episode holds a score of 8.6 out of 10 based on 17 ratings, denoting "universal acclaim".

Matt Fowler of IGN gave the episode a 9 out of 10, and called the final scene "one of the best things I’ve seen Tyrion do in a long while. He let a lifetime of hate ooze out of him like never before."

=== Awards and nominations ===
Year	Award	Category	Nominee(s)	Result	Ref(s)
2014	Primetime Emmy Awards	Outstanding Supporting Actor in a Drama Series	Peter Dinklage as Tyrion Lannister	Nominated	
2014	Primetime Creative Arts Emmy Awards	Outstanding Art Direction for a Single-Camera Fantasy Series	Deborah Riley, Paul Ghirardani, and Rob Cameron	Won	
2015	ADG Excellence in Production Design Award	One-Hour Single Camera Fantasy Television Series	Deborah Riley	Won	
