= Alex Graves =

American film director

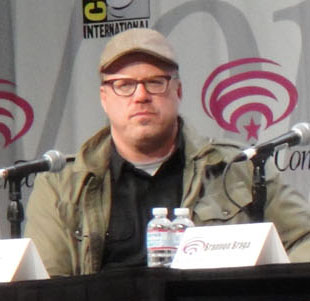
- Alex Graves at the 2011 WonderCon.
- Born: Alexander John Graves; July 23, 1965 (age 61); Kansas City, Missouri
- Occupations: Film director, television director, television producer, screenwriter

Alexander John Graves (born July 23, 1965) is an American film director, television director, television producer and screenwriter.

== Early life ==
Alex Graves was born in Kansas City, Missouri. His father, William Graves, was a reporter for The Kansas City Star and his mother, Alexandra "Sandy" Graves, worked for United States Senator Nancy Kassebaum of Kansas. His family moved to his father's home town of El Dorado, Kansas when he was young, when his father became a partner in the family drug store business. Graves grew up making films on Super 8 and ultimately attended the University of Kansas and the University of Southern California where he earned a BA Degree in Film Production.

Upon graduating, Graves backpacked across Europe, finally running out of money in Aswan, Egypt near the border of Sudan.

== Career ==
At the age of 25, Graves wrote, produced and directed the independent film, The Crude Oasis. The film was released by Miramax and led to Graves being hired to direct episodes of The Practice, Ally McBeal and Aaron Sorkin's Sports Night.

Graves quickly went on to direct 34 episodes of the series The West Wing, where he served as director, producer, supervising producer, co-executive producer, and ultimately executive producer. He won two Primetime Emmy Awards for his production work on that series. He was also nominated for the Emmy for his direction of the episodes "Posse Comitatus" and "2162 Votes." He was awarded the Humanitas Prize for his work on the episode "NSF Thurmont."

In 2006, he directed the pilot episode of The Nine for ABC, serving as an executive producer on the pilot. In 2007, he directed and executive produced the pilot, and directed several more episodes, of the drama Journeyman, which aired on NBC. In 2009, Graves was asked by J. J. Abrams to direct and executive produce the pilot of the Fox science-fiction series Fringe.

From 2010 to 2011, Graves worked for Steven Spielberg to direct and executive produce the pilot of the Fox adventure series Terra Nova. The series premiered September 26, 2011. In 2010, he directed and executive produced the ABC pilot The Whole Truth for Jerry Bruckheimer. This pilot also went on to become a series. In 2011, Graves directed a pilot for ABC entitled Poe, a re-imagining of the life of author Edgar Allan Poe, starring Natalie Dormer and Christopher Egan, which did not go to series. Graves then directed and executive produced the ABC pilot 666 Park Avenue.

Of the 14 pilots directed by Graves, 12 were picked up to series.

In 2012, Graves directed Showtime's Shameless for John Wells before being asked by Aaron Sorkin to direct his new HBO series The Newsroom.

Between 2012 and 2014, Graves directed six episodes of HBO's Game of Thrones, two episodes in season 3 and four episodes of the ten produced for season 4. His Game of Thrones episode titled "The Children" won him a DGA nomination and was theatrically released in IMAX during 2015.

In 2014, Graves also directed Bloodline for Netflix and was hired to direct a feature film retelling of "Beauty and the Beast," but production was cancelled when Disney announced it was producing its own version.

In 2015, Graves was the executive producer of the supernatural medical television drama Proof on TNT.

In 2016, Graves was chosen as director for Sony's upcoming Mulan live-action remake, but production was cancelled when Disney announced a competing production.

In 2017, Graves directed two episodes of the Netflix original Altered Carbon.

From 2014 to 2019, Graves directed seven episodes of Homeland starring Claire Danes. In 2019, Graves directed two episodes of the USA Network original Treadstone on location in Paris and New Delhi.

In 2019, he directed "What I Know," the season 2 finale of The Boys.

From 2020 to 2022, Graves directed seven episodes of Foundation.

In 2022, Graves was tapped to be executive producer on The Diplomat starring Keri Russell for Netflix. He has since directed fourteen episodes of the series across its four seasons.

Graves has been married to Lillian Graves since 2018.
