= Alik Sakharov =

Soviet cinematographer (born 1959)

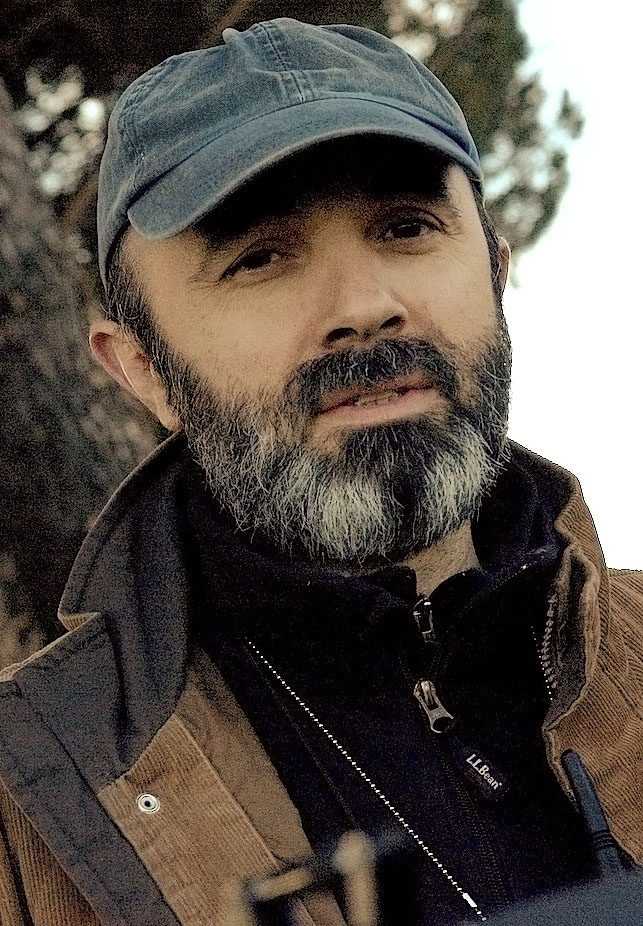
- Sakharov in 2006
- Born: May 17, 1959 (age 67); Tashkent, Soviet Union (now Uzbekistan)
- Occupation: Film director
- Years active: 1985–present
- Notable work: The Sopranos; Rome; Black Sails; Marco Polo; Game of Thrones; House of Cards; The Witcher; Ozark; Lanterns

Alik Sakharov (born May 17, 1959) is a film and television director. A former director of photography, he is an active member of the American Society of Cinematographers (ASC).

== Career ==
Sakharov entered the US film scene in 1985 when he began sharing the responsibilities of a lighting cameraman in the New York industrial video scene, eventually progressing to shooting music videos, commercials, and narrative films.

Sakharov served as director of photography on numerous feature films, as well as numerous television series, including 38 episodes of The Sopranos, and as director/cinematographer for episodes of Rome , Game of Thrones (8 episodes) and Lanterns. He served as director/co-executive producer on the third season of Black Sails.

In seasons one and two of Netflix series Marco Polo, Sakharov directed: "Feast"; "The Fourth Step"; "Lost Crane"; "The Fellowship". He directed a Marco Polo stand-alone Christmas-special episode, entitled "Marco Polo: One Hundred Eyes".

In 2016 he directed episodes of Goliath for the Amazon Studios. That same year, he joined Netflix' House of Cards, directing chapters 55, 56, 59, 66, and 72.

In 2018, he directed episodes of Ozark. Later that year, Sakharov joined The Witcher. After completing nearly three episodes in season one, he amicably parted ways with the project.

In 2019, Sakharov returned to Ozark to direct the mega-block of the last four episodes in season three. He received an Outstanding Directing for a Drama Series Emmy Nomination for the penultimate episode of the season "Fire Pink".

In 2022, Sakharov joined AppleTV+. He served as Director/Executive Producer on seasons 2 and 3 of Invasion (2022 & 2024) and as director of the Dark Matter in seasons 1 and 2 (2023 & 2025).

In 2025, it was announced that Sakharov would be directing episodes of DC Studios' Lanterns for HBO.

== Awards ==
As a member of the Sopranos creative ensemble, Sakharov was honored twice (in 2002 & 2004) by the American Film Institute's A Year of Excellence Award.

In 2004, Sakharov earned the 19th Annual ASC Awards nomination for Outstanding Achievement in Cinematography in a single camera category for The Sopranos episode "Long Term Parking".

In 2007, Sakharov won the Primetime Emmy Award for Outstanding Cinematography for the ROME episode "Passover".

In 2013, Sakharov won the OFTA Award for Best Direction In A Drama Series for Game of Thrones.

In 2020, Sakharov earned a Primetime Emmy Award Nomination for Outstanding Directing in a Drama Series for Ozark episode "Fire Pink".

== Credentials ==
Since 2006 Sakharov has worked primarily as a television director, with credits including:

- Boardwalk Empire
- Game of Thrones
- Rome
- Dexter
- Rubicon
- Brotherhood
- The Sopranos (2nd unit director "Made in America"; "Kennedy and Heidi")
- Easy Money
- The Americans
- Black Sails
- Marco Polo
- Flesh and Bone
- House of Cards
- Counterpart
- Ozark
- Goliath
- The Witcher
- Invasion
- Dark Matter
- Lanterns
