= Dominic Carter (actor) =

British actor

Dominic Carter is an English actor. Carter has appeared in several British television and film projects, including Going Off Big Time, Dockers, The Bill, Dalziel and Pascoe, Doctors, Drop Dead Gorgeous and The Case. He played the recurring role of DC Hooch in Coronation Street and he portrayed Janos Slynt in four seasons of the HBO TV series Game of Thrones.

== Filmography ==
Film
Year	Title	Role	Notes
1999	Dockers	Charlie	TV film
2000	Going Off Big Time	Ozzi Shepherd	
2005	Derailed	Michael Hodder	TV film
2011	Charlie Noades R.I.P.	Mick	
2017	Murdered for Being Different	DC Mark Green	TV film
2017	The Children Act	Roger	
2018	Together	DI Saunders	

Television
Year	Title	Role	Notes
1995	Soldier Soldier	Mess Waiter	1 episode ("Love and War")
1996	No Bananas	Matelot	1 episode ("Cricket")
1996	Pie in the Sky	Journalist	1 episode ("Gary's Cake")
1996–2008	The Bill	Steve O'Sullivan; Sean Massey; Peter Murray; Bob Flanagan	1 episode ("Track Marks"); 1 episode ("The Cross"); 1 episode ("203"); 1 episode ("R.I.P.P.I.")
1997	Dalziel and Pascoe	Jonty Marsh	1 episode ("Deadheads")
1998	Get Real	Paramedic	1 episode ("Leg")
2000	Black Books	First hooligan	1 episode ("Cooking the Books")
2001	Merseybeat	Marty Scanlan	1 episode ("Deep End")
2003	Eyes Down	Marksman	1 episode ("Episode 1.6")
2003	Coming Up	Jamie	1 episode ("Bed Bugs")
2006	Holby City	Archie Burns	1 episode ("Brother's Keeper")
2006	My Family	Orderly	1 episode ("The Heart of Christmas")
2006–2007	Drop Dead Gorgeous	Tiggsy Willis	6 episodes
2006–2015	Doctors	Barry Shearman; Ray Garvey; David Sutton	1 episode ("Of All the Car Parks in All the World"); 1 episode ("The Official Line"); 1 episode ("Signs and Wonders")
2008–2009	Coronation Street	DC Hooch	19 episodes
2011	The Case	Karl Rankine	5 episodes
2011–2015	Game of Thrones	Janos Slynt	15 episodes
2014	Moving On	Derek	1 episode ("The Beneficiary")
2016	Guilt	Malcolm	1 episode ("The Crown v Atwood")
2018	Endeavour	CSM Davies	1 episode ("Colours")
2018	Friday Night Dinner	Policeman	1 episode ("The Violin")
2018	Holby City	Sean Kendler	1 episode ("Undoing")
2021	The Irregulars	Old dock worker	1 episode ("The Ecstasy of Life")
2021	Around the World in 80 Days	Customs official	1 episode ("Episode 8")
2022	Casualty	Terry Edge	1 episode ("By Any Means")
2022	Crossfire	Colin	1 episode ("Episode 1")
2022–2024	The Responder	Sgt. Bernie Wilson	2 episodes
2026	Legends	Wayne Duffy	1 episode ("The War on Drugs")
