= Petyr Baelish =

Fictional character from Game of Thrones

- A Song of Ice and Fire character Game of Thrones character
- Aidan Gillen as Petyr Baelish
- First appearance: Literature: A Game of Thrones (1996); Television: "Lord Snow" (2011)
- Last appearance: Television: "The Dragon and the Wolf" (2017)
- Created by: George R. R. Martin
- Adapted by: David Benioff; D. B. Weiss
- Portrayed by: Aidan Gillen

In-universe information
- Alias: Littlefinger
- Gender: Male
- Titles: Master of Coin; Lord of Harrenhal; Lord Protector of the Vale; Novels: Lord Paramount of the Trident
- Family: Alayne Baelish (mother); Catelyn Stark (sister-in-law); Edmure Tully (brother-in-law)
- Spouse: Lysa Arryn
- Children: Alayne Stone (alleged bastard daughter)

Petyr Baelish, nicknamed Littlefinger, is a fictional character in the A Song of Ice and Fire series of fantasy novels by American author George R. R. Martin and one of three main antagonists of its television adaptation, Game of Thrones, alongside Tywin Lannister and Cersei Lannister. Introduced in 1996's A Game of Thrones, Littlefinger is the master of coin on King Robert's small council. He is a childhood friend of Catelyn Stark, having grown up with her and her two siblings at Riverrun. He subsequently appeared in Martin's books A Clash of Kings (1998), A Storm of Swords (2000), and A Feast for Crows (2005). He is set to appear in the forthcoming novel The Winds of Winter.

Littlefinger's primary character attributes are his cunning and boundless ambition. Originally hailing from a minor family with little wealth or influence, Baelish used manipulation, bribery, and the connections he secured at Riverrun to gain power and prestige in King's Landing. His intrigues cause several major events that impact Westeros, including the framing of Tyrion Lannister for the attempt on Bran Stark's life, the downfall of Lord Eddard Stark, the deaths of Lord Jon Arryn and King Joffrey Baratheon, and the War of the Five Kings. He is one of the main antagonists in the series.

Littlefinger was portrayed by Irish actor Aidan Gillen in the HBO television adaptation, who received praise for his performance.

== Character ==
Littlefinger is not a point-of-view character in the novels, so his actions are witnessed and interpreted through other people's eyes, such as Ned Stark, Catelyn Stark, Sansa Stark, Tyrion, and Cersei Lannister.

== Background ==
Lord Petyr Baelish is portrayed as a person of favors. Moreover, he keeps personal profits above all else. Petyr descends from a Braavosi sellsword who served House Corbray. His father befriended Lord Hoster Tully during the War of the Ninepenny Kings, and Tully took the young Petyr as a ward. Petyr grew up at House Tully's castle Riverrun with Hoster's daughters Catelyn and Lysa, and son Edmure; Edmure nicknamed Petyr "Littlefinger" in reference to his short stature and his family's lands on the smallest of the peninsulas called the Fingers. Petyr was a sly, mischievous child with the ability to always look contrite after his mischief. He became infatuated with Catelyn and claims to have lost his virginity to her while drunk; in reality, he lost it to Lysa, who was obsessed with him. When Catelyn was betrothed to Brandon Stark (Eddard Stark's elder brother, namesake of Eddard's son Bran), Petyr brazenly challenged him to a duel for her hand in marriage but lost easily to Brandon. Petyr's life was spared at Catelyn's behest. During his convalescence, Lysa approached Petyr and the two slept together, as Petyr mistook Lysa for Catelyn in his delirious state. But the pregnancy ended in a forced abortion, and Petyr was banished from Riverrun.

Even after her marriage to Jon Arryn, Lysa remained in love with Petyr. Her patronage saw Baelish appointed as customs officer at Gulltown, a position he excelled at. In the books it was around this time that Petyr's unnamed father died and passed the unnamed "Baelish Tower" in the Fingers to his son, making him a lord. However, in the show it is implied that both of Baelish's parents died when Petyr was much younger. Jon Arryn, who was Hand to King Robert Baratheon, eventually brought Baelish to King's Landing as Master of Coin. When Arryn tries to have his and Lysa's son Robin sent to Dragonstone to be fostered by Stannis Baratheon, Baelish gives Lysa poison to kill Jon and convinces her to tell Catelyn that House Lannister was responsible. This subterfuge sets in motion the main events of the series.

=== Appearance and personality ===
Petyr Baelish is a small man, shorter than Catelyn Stark. He is slender and quick, with sharp features and laughing green eyes. He has a pointed chin beard and threads of silver in his hair. He often wears a silver mockingbird to fasten his cloak. He clearly enjoys the intrigues of court life at King's Landing. He is dangerously intelligent, utterly Machiavellian, and cunning enough to hide his machinations. Since Petyr is not a POV character his motivations are somewhat of a mystery. However he has stated his motivations were his lingering love towards Catelyn Stark and (in the show) Sansa Stark. Many are skeptical of this, with Sansa Stark stating 'the only person Littlefinger serves is Littlefinger.' An amoral opportunist, his methods are totally unscrupulous, including the use of lies, treachery, and murder to achieve his goals.

== Storylines ==
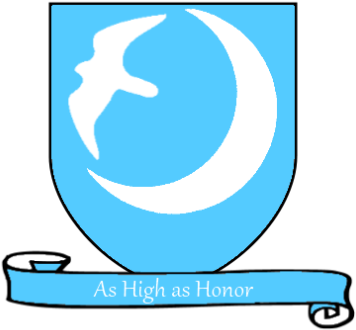
Coat of arms of House Arryn

=== A Game of Thrones ===
Baelish, the "Master of Coin" in charge of the realm's finances on King Robert's Small Council, is disliked by the Hand, Ned Stark, who initially considers him as flippant as he is untrustworthy. Baelish hides Catelyn at one of his brothels, when she brings Ned the news of the attempt on Bran's life, and tells her the dagger used was won from him by Tyrion Lannister. This leads to Catelyn's capture of Tyrion; but this information is later identified as a lie. Tyrion mentions during his captivity at the Eyrie that Baelish has frequently claimed to have had a sexual relationship with Lady Catelyn during their youth together at Riverrun, a claim she indignantly rejects. Petyr helps Eddard expose the secret parentage of the royal children, but advises him to abet Joffrey's rise to power in order to consolidate their own. Ned insists that Stannis must be king and asks Baelish to secure the help of the City Watch when he moves against the Lannisters, but Petyr betrays Lord Stark and aids his arrest.

=== A Clash of Kings ===
After the death of Renly Baratheon, Petyr arranges an alliance between the Lannisters and the powerful House Tyrell, which leads to Stannis Baratheon's defeat. When Joffrey is convinced to marry Renly's widow, Margaery Tyrell, in A Storm of Swords, Petyr is named Lord of Harrenhal and Lord Paramount of the Trident in place of Edmure Tully.

=== A Storm of Swords ===
Baelish is given charge to marry Lysa Arryn and bring the Vale under the control of the Lannisters; before departing he reveals Olenna Tyrell's plan to marry Sansa Stark to Willas Tyrell, leading to Sansa's forced marriage to Tyrion. When Joffrey is poisoned at his wedding feast, Petyr has Sansa whisked away from King's Landing in the confusion and takes her to his holdings on The Fingers, disguised as his illegitimate daughter. During the voyage, Petyr reveals that he had conspired with Olenna Tyrell to poison Joffrey and blame Tyrion for the murder. Lysa arrives at Petyr's keep and promptly marries him at Lysa's insistence, although Petyr would have preferred a court wedding. After the wedding, Baelish and Sansa travel to the Eyrie, where he spends much of the time asserting his new authority over the lords of the Vale. While alone with Sansa, he notes her physical similarity to Catelyn and kisses Sansa. Witnessing the encounter, Lysa tries to kill Sansa a short time later. Petyr rushes to comfort Lysa, but reveals that he had only ever loved Catelyn and pushes Lysa to her death. He immediately implicates the only other witness, the minstrel Marillion.

=== A Feast for Crows ===
Petyr names himself Lord Protector and claims Lysa's son Robin as his ward. The Lords of the Vale also try to claim Robin, but Petyr bribes Lyn Corbray to help Petyr obtain leverage to keep Robin. Petyr later reveals to Sansa that he plans to either eliminate the lords or win them to his side, and to help Sansa regain the North. He also tells her that he has arranged for her to marry Robin Arryn's cousin and heir, Harrold Hardyng, and that on Robin's death she will reveal herself and use the Knights of the Vale to recover the North.

=== The Winds of Winter ===
Petyr is set to appear in the sixth volume, still in the Vale with Sansa and Robert Arryn. He will hold a tournament, the winners of which will be inducted into the Brotherhood of Winged Nights, an order similar to the Kingsguard that will protect young Robert Arryn. However, knowing that the sickly child will soon die, he plans for Sansa to wed Harrold Hardyng, Robert's heir, so that the knights of the Vale will rally behind her to retake the North from House Bolton.

== TV adaptation ==
=== Seasons 1 and 2 ===
Baelish's storyline remains much the same as in the books for the first few seasons of the television series, with only minor details changed. In later seasons, however, his story is significantly different.

=== Season 3 ===
Having become Lord of Harrenhal, Petyr plans to sail to the Eyrie to propose marriage to Lysa Arryn, taking Sansa with him. One of his prostitutes, Ros, learns of his plan and warns Varys, who arranges with Olenna Tyrell to have Sansa wed Loras Tyrell. Baelish's spy Olyvar, who is posing as Loras' squire and lover, tips Baelish off to the plot. Baelish, in turn, gives this information to Tywin Lannister, who has Sansa wed Tyrion instead. Realising that Ros has betrayed him, Baelish hands her over to Joffrey to kill for his entertainment.

=== Season 4 ===
In the aftermath of Lysa Arryn's death, Baelish is questioned by several lords of the Vale. Baelish maintains that Lysa committed suicide, and Sansa corroborates this assertion. Baelish decides to take Robin Arryn on a tour of his domain, with Sansa accompanying them.

=== Season 5 ===
Baelish brokers a marriage alliance between Sansa and Ramsay Bolton, the sadistic son of the new Warden of the North Roose Bolton. Baelish mentions to Roose how the alliance of the North and the Vale brought down the Targaryens, the "mightiest dynasty" in Westerosi history, with the implication that a new alliance might have similar effects. Although Baelish assures Roose that the marriage alliance will strengthen their respective positions, Baelish privately tells Sansa that Stannis Baratheon is marching on Winterfell and will likely defeat the Boltons in battle if the Northern lords join him. However, before Sansa and Ramsay's wedding, Cersei summons Baelish to King's Landing to ascertain his loyalties. Baelish reassures Cersei of the Vale's allegiance to the Lannisters and tells her of Sansa's marriage to Ramsay, neglecting to reveal his role in arranging the marriage. Cersei is outraged, and Baelish offers to use the Vale's forces to defeat whoever is left of the Bolton and Baratheon armies following the battle, revealing that his true plan all along was to be named Warden of the North, a request Cersei grants. Before his departure Baelish meets with Olenna Tyrell, who is furious that testimony from Olyvar has led to the arrests of Margaery and Loras Tyrell. When Olenna threatens to reveal Baelish's role in Joffrey's murder, Baelish arranges for Lancel Lannister to tell the religious leader, the High Sparrow, of Cersei's crimes, leading to her arrest.

=== Season 6 ===
Baelish reunites with Robin Arryn at Runestone and claims that Sansa was abducted by the Boltons, before manipulating him into sending the Vale's forces to defend her. Baelish later meets Sansa in Mole's Town, insisting that he was unaware of Ramsay's cruelty. He offers the support of the knights of the Vale in retaking Winterfell and mentions that Sansa's great-uncle Brynden "Blackfish" Tully has seized Riverrun from the Freys. Sansa refuses Baelish's offer and declares that she never wants to see him again. However, after Sansa and Jon Snow are unable to gather enough men to match the Boltons, Sansa sends a raven to Baelish asking for his aid. Baelish leads the men on Winterfell, and they arrive in time to destroy the unsuspecting Bolton army before they can slaughter the Starks. After the battle, Baelish reveals to Sansa that his ambition is to take the Iron Throne with her by his side, but she rebuffs his advances. Baelish is present when the Northmen and Valemen declare Jon King in the North, but instead of cheering for Jon, he looks at Sansa.

=== Season 7 ===
Throughout the season, after Jon Snow threatens him to stay away from Sansa, Baelish attempts to turn Sansa and her sister Arya against each other following the latter's return to Winterfell. To add further incentive, Baelish arranges for Arya to find the letter Sansa wrote Robb, asking him to surrender, while she was held by the Lannisters. Baelish continues his manipulation of Sansa, seemingly convincing her that Arya intends to murder her and take her role as Lady of Winterfell. Sansa brings Arya into the hall with everyone present, including a smug Baelish, and appears to accuse her of murder and treason, but she reveals that the accusations are actually directed at Baelish himself. Caught off-guard, Baelish sputters with confusion but eventually recovers and questions Sansa about what's happening. Sansa accuses him of murdering Lysa Arryn despite the two of them having claimed earlier to the Lords of the Vale that Lysa committed suicide, but Baelish tries to curry favor with Sansa by reminding her that he killed Lysa to stop her from pushing Sansa through the moon door out of jealousy. Sansa goes on to reveal more of Baelish's crimes such as arranging Jon Arryn's murder, betraying Ned Stark to Joffrey, and manipulating the Starks, Lannisters and numerous other houses into war so that he could claim the Iron Throne for himself. Baelish denies these accusations, citing a lack of evidence or credible witnesses, though Bran claims that he saw Baelish betray Ned in a vision. Baelish then realizes that the "trial" is merely a show and he has essentially been brought to the hall to be killed without a proper chance to defend himself. Panicking, he tries to convince Sansa to speak with him alone and listen to his side of the story, but Sansa refuses, citing his earlier advice to figure out her true enemies' intentions. Baelish furiously orders his bannerman Yohn Royce to escort him back to the Vale, which Royce refuses after having heard Baelish admit to murdering Lysa. With nowhere left to run, Baelish gets down on his knees and emotionally begs Sansa to spare his life, telling her how much he loved her and her mother. Sansa reminds him that he betrayed them nonetheless and orders Arya to kill him. After Sansa thanks Baelish for his lessons, Arya executes him by cutting his throat with his own Valyrian dagger, therefore avenging all those killed as a result of the War of the Five Kings from Houses Stark, Baratheon, Lannister, Bolton, Frey, Greyjoy, Arryn, Tyrell, Karstark and Umber. His body is presumably burned afterwards to prevent him from returning as a wight.

=== Critical reception ===
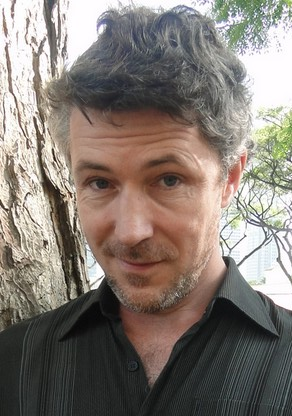
Aidan Gillen plays the role of Petyr Baelish in the television series

Gillen's performance has received significant praise. Huw Fullerton of Radio Times praised his performance on the show. Writing for The Huffington Post, Gil Kidron described the character as "gross...creepy...evil" and stated, "you should root for him to win." Kidron claims, "in Westeros he's a 99 percenter." Kidron writes Petyr is "doing it for himself", but "he's working tirelessly to destroy an old and decaying world that none of us would want to live in." In an article published in the National Review, Grant Starrett claimed that every red-blooded American should root for Littlefinger. Starrett praised Baelish's rags-to-riches story, saying, "He epitomizes what could soon be called the Westerosi Dream." Meritocracy, social mobility, and an end to a failing system are all reasons to support Petyr Baelish for the Iron Throne, according to Starrett.

=== Recognition and awards ===
Aidan Gillen has received award nominations for his portrayal. His nominations include Portal Award for Best Supporting Actor in 2012, and Irish Film & Television Awards for Best Supporting Actor on Television in 2012 and 2014.
