= Josef Altin =

Turkish-British television and film actor

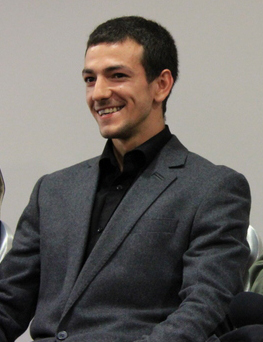
- Altin at Collectormania in 2012
- Born: Yusuf Altın; 12 February 1983 (age 43); London, England
- Other name: Yousef Altin
- Years active: 1999–present

Josef Altin (born as Yusuf Altın; 12 February 1983) is a British television and film actor who had the role of Pypar in the HBO fantasy TV series Game of Thrones. Other notable performances is his role as Ekrem in Eastern Promises and his roles in The Bill, Peep Show, and Casualty. He starred in D.C. Moore's hit play The Empire at the Royal Court Theatre in London. Altin also played the role of Darren in Him & Her, a BBC TV series.

== Life and career ==
Altin was born in London, to a Turkish family.

Altin's earliest television roles were as Garry in the drama series Psychos and a machine strimmer in Blackpool. Altin has appeared on The Bill in two different roles, as Jay Henderson from 2006 to 2007, and as Peter Balmaine in 2009.

Other television series in which he has appeared include Peep Show, Doctors, Robin Hood, Casualty, Little Miss Jocelyn, New Tricks, Being Human, Misfits and Law & Order: UK. In the HBO fantasy TV series Game of Thrones, Altin portrayed the character named Pypar, commonly called Pyp.

In 2007, Altin appeared in two films, as Bully in Boy A, and as Ekrem in Eastern Promises. In 2015, he had roles in the films Narcopolis and Child 44, as well as the six-part British television drama series River on BBC One. The following year, he starred in the short film, I Dream of Zombies.

In 2017 Altin appeared in the E4 sitcom Chewing Gum as Ryan, and portrayed Prince Rasselas, a young molly boy who plies his trade on the streets of Covent Garden, in the Hulu Original Harlots. In 2018, Altin played Willem Van Burgen, a disturbed paedophile suffering from syphilis, who comes from a wealthy family, suspected of being the serial killer of boys in the TNT period drama, The Alienist.

== Filmography ==
Year	Film or Series	Role	Notes
1999	Psychos	Garry	Episode #1.5
2000	Esther Kahn	Samuel as a child	
2001	My Other Wheelchair Is a Porsche	Ron	Short
2002	Dirty Pretty Things	Sweatshop Boy	
2002	Babyfather	Eric's Friend	Episode #2.7
2004	Blackpool	Machine Strimmer	Episode #1.2
2004–2009	The Bill	Multiple Character	Seven episodes
2005	Gypo	Michael	
2005	Murphy's Law	Phillip	Ep #3.2
2005	Stoned	Bill Wyman	
2005	The Golden Hour	Robert	Episode #1.4
2005	Peep Show	Mugger No. 1	Episode #3.1
2006	Doctors	Liam Aitkin	Episode #7.168
2006	Soundproof	Stee	
2006	Robin Hood	Benedict Giddens	Episode #1.1
2006	Pulling	Skinzo	Episode #1.6
2006–2009	Casualty	Multiple Characters	Three episodes
2007	What Goes Around (short)	Cola	Short
2007	Ruby Blue	Frankie	
2007	Eastern Promises	Ekrem	
2007	Boy A	Bully	
2007	The Omid Djalili Show		Episode #1.2
2008	Little Miss Jocelyn	Bully	Episode #2.1; Episode #2.3
2008	West 10 LDN	Ratty	
2008	10 Days to War	Young Lad	Episode #1.5
2008	Poppy Shakespeare	Zubin	
2008	New Tricks	Steve Pearson	Episode #5.7
2008	God on Trial	Issac	
2008	No Heroics	Robber	Episode #1.1
2009	M.I.High	Kranky	Episode #3.1
2009	Tender	Ross	Short
2009	Being Human	Billy	Episode #1.5; Episode #1.6
2009	The Young Victoria	Edward Oxford	
2009	Beautiful People	Ricky	Episode #2.4
2009–2011	Misfits	Gary	Episode #1.1; Episode #3.4
2010	The Pizza Miracle	Paesano	Short
2010	Baby	Emit	Short
2010	Law & Order: UK	Ray Cole	Episode #3.2
2010	Reggie Perrin	Young Boss	Episode #2.1
2011	Albatross	Dave	
2011–2012	Him & Her	Darren	Episode 2.4; Episode 3.3
2011; 2013–2014	Game of Thrones	Pypar	Recurring character, 13 episodes
2012	Comes a Bright Day	Clegg	
2012	A Mother's Son	Sean Christie	Episode #1.1; Episode #1.2
2012	Les Misérables	Convict 2	
2012	Now Is Good	Jake	
2013	Holby City	Alex Jules	S15E33; Back From the Dead
2013	Dreck	Ambro Trader	
2013	By Any Means	Jason Turner	
2013	Vendetta	Rob	
2013	Hummingbird	Pizza Delivery Guy	
2014	A Long Way Down	Matty	
2014	The Hooligan Factory	Weasel	
2015	River	Christopher Riley	Episodes 1,2
2015	Narcopolis	Ambro Dealer	
2015	Child 44	Alexander	
2016	Peaky Blinders	Stefan	Episode #3.5
2017	Chewing Gum	Ryan	
2017	Harlots	Prince Rasselas	
2018	The Alienist	Silver Smile / Willem Van Burgen	Three episodes
2018	Tomb Raider	Bruce	
2018	Les Misérables	Claquesous	1 episode
2019	Chernobyl	Soldier	Episode #1.4
2019	Top Boy	Drug Addict/Undercover Policeman	Recurring character
2019	Star Wars: The Rise of Skywalker	Lieutenant Seftin Vanik	
2020	Officer Down	Amir	
2025	Last Breath	Mike	
2026	Waiting for the Out	Greg Turner	5 episodes

== Music videos ==
- Jamie T – If You Got The Money 2007
- Javeon – Give Up 2013
