= Game of Thrones: Season 7 (soundtrack) =

Soundtrack album by Ramin Djawadi
- Released: August 25, 2017
- Genre: Soundtrack
- Length: 74:20
- Label: WaterTower Music
- Producer: Ramin Djawadi

Ramin Djawadi soundtrack chronology
The Great Wall (2016)	Game of Thrones: Season 7 (2017)	The Mountain Between Us (2017)

The soundtrack album of the seventh season of HBO series Game of Thrones, titled Game of Thrones: Season 7, was released digitally on August 25, 2017 on CD on September 29, 2017.

== Track listing ==
No.	Title	Key scenes/Notes	Length
1.	"Main Titles"	Used in the opening sequence. New version introduced in season 6.	1:53
2.	"Dragonstone"	"Dragonstone": Daenerys and her retinue arrive at Dragonstone. Contains hints of the Daenerys Targaryen theme ("Love in the Eyes", "Dracarys", "Breaker of Chains", and "Dance of Dragons").	5:06
3.	"Shall We Begin?"	"Dragonstone": Closing credits of the episode. Contains the hints of the Daenerys Targaryen theme ("Love in the Eyes", "Dracarys", "Breaker of Chains", and "Dance of Dragons").	1:24
4.	"The Queen's Justice"	"The Queen's Justice": Played during the closing credits. Contains hints of the House Lannister theme ("A Lannister Always Pays His Debts"). A similar version is used on the main menu of season 7's DVD/Blu-ray release.	1:21
5.	"A Game I Like to Play"	"The Dragon and the Wolf": Littlefinger manipulates Sansa into believing Arya is the enemy. Contains a slow and ominous variation of the House Stark theme.	1:45
6.	"I Am the Storm"	"Stormborn": Euron Greyjoy battles aboard his niece Yara's ship. Theon jumps off the ship after Euron holds Yara at knifepoint. It is an action piece that mixes hints of Euron Greyjoy's theme ("Coronation") and the Greyjoy theme ("What Is Dead May Never Die") and the Sand Snakes' theme ("Unbowed, Unbent, Unbroken").	6:25
7.	"The Gift"	"The Queen's Justice": Euron Greyjoy parades through King's Landing and the Iron Throne room with Yara Greyjoy, and Ellaria and Tyene Sand as hostages. It contains hints of Euron Greyjoy's theme ("Coronation") and the Sand Snakes' theme ("Unbowed, Unbent, Unbroken").	2:03
8.	"Dragonglass"	"The Spoils of War": Jon shows Daenerys the dragonglass mine, including the paintings by the Children of the Forest. Daenerys agrees to fight for Jon and the North only if he bends the knee. It contains a subtle hint from Jon & Ygritte's theme ("You Know Nothing") and variations of "White Walkers", one of the many themes for the White Walkers'. It also introduces a common theme for Jon Snow and Daenerys Targaryen.	4:19
9.	"Spoils of War (Pt. 1)"	"The Spoils of War": Daenerys, with Drogon and the Dothraki, attacks the Lannister and Tarly forces. It contains hints from Daenerys's themes ("Dracarys" and "Dance of Dragons"), the Dothraki's theme ("To Vaes Dothrak") as well as the House Lannister theme ("A Lannister Always Pays His Debts").	3:53
10.	"Spoils of War (Pt. 2)"	"The Spoils of War": Tyrion Lannister watches with horror the battle as Daenerys continues her attack. Bronn uses the Scorpion and hits Drogon. Jaime charges alone against Daenerys and is pushed into the Blackwater Rush by Bronn. It contains hints from "Dracarys", "Dance of Dragons," the Lannister theme, and a variation of Cersei's theme ("Light of the Seven") for the Scorpion.	4:03
11.	"The Dagger"	"The Dragon and the Wolf": Littlefinger tearfully begs for mercy after being charged with several crimes, betraying Ned Stark among them, but Sansa has Arya slit his throat. It is slow and ominous variation of Littlefinger's theme ("Chaos Is a Ladder")	2:34
12.	"Home"	"The Spoils of War": Arya returns to Winterfell. "The Dragon and the Wolf": Sansa repeats her father's words: "The lone wolf dies but the pack survives". It predominantly uses variations of the House Stark theme ("Goodbye Brother").	2:30
13.	"Gorgeous Beasts"	"Eastwatch": Daenerys returns on top of Drogon to Dragonstone and the dragon lets Jon Snow pet him, much to Daenerys's surprise. It contains hints of Daenerys's theme as well as Jon & Daenerys's theme.	2:11
14.	"The Long Farewell"	"The Queen's Justice": Cersei exacts revenge on Ellaria and Tyene Sand. It contains a variation of "Light of the Seven" at the end, as well as a sound effect first heard during the half of "Jaws of the Viper".	2:46
15.	"Against All Odds"	"Beyond the Wall": The battle on the frozen lake. Jon and his fellows are surrounded by wights. Daenerys rescues the group. The Night King kills Viserion. Benjen Stark sacrifice his life to save Jon. It contains hints of Daenerys's theme, the White Walkers' theme, Jon Snow's theme, Jon & Daenerys's theme, and the Army of the Dead's theme. Contains also small hints of "When the Sun rises in the West".	7:48
16.	"See You for What You Are"	"Beyond the Wall": Daenerys agrees to an alliance to fight the Night King, Jon Snow pledges allegiance to Daenerys and both show hints of their romantic feelings for each other. It is predominantly a subdued variation of Jon & Daenerys's theme.	2:09
17.	"Casterly Rock"	"The Queen's Justice": Tyrion relates his plan of sacking of Casterly Rock as the Unsullied carry out the sacking. "The Dragon and the Wolf": The Unsullied stand in formation in front of King's Landing. It contains hints of the Unsullied theme and the Lannister theme.	2:23
18.	"A Lion's Legacy"	"The Queen's Justice": The Lannister and Tarly forces lay siege to Highgarden. Jaime is seen walking through the taken castle to meet Olenna Tyrell. It contains a triumphant variation of the Lannister theme.	1:34
19.	"Message for Cersei"	"The Queen's Justice": Olenna Tyrell drinks Jaime's poison and confesses having poisoned Joffrey on his wedding ceremony. After being asked by her to tell Cersei of the truth, a disgusted Jaime leaves the room. It contains a dirgelike variation of the Lannister theme and features elements of the fifth season track "Mother's Mercy".	1:43
20.	"Ironborn"	"Stormborn": Closing credits. "The Dragon and the Wolf": Theon Greyjoy confess his crimes to Jon Snow. After, Theon wins the loyalty of his remaining men and washes his face with the salty waters of the beach, symbolizing the recovery of his strength. It contains the Greyjoy theme ("What Is Dead May Never Die").	2:19
21.	"No One Walks Away from Me"	"The Dragon and the Wolf": Cersei tells Jaime that she intends to betray Daenerys and Jon. Disgusted by her actions, Jaime leaves Cersei, despite her threat to kill him. Contains hints from Cersei's theme ("Light of the Seven" and "Hear Me Roar").	2:11
22.	"Truth"	Jon and Daenerys's theme. "The Dragon and the Wolf": Samwell and Bran discover that Jon is a trueborn son of Rhaegar Targaryen and Lyanna Stark named Aegon Targaryen and an heir to the Iron Throne. Bran witnesses their wedding ceremony as Jon and Daenerys make love on the ship heading for White Harbour. The cue is the full version, albeit with grand variations, of Jon & Daenerys theme.	3:31
23.	"The Army of the Dead"	"The Dragon and the Wolf": The Night King rides the undead Viserion and attacks Eastwatch, ultimately crumbling a big section of the Wall. The dead are seen marching past the breached Wall. It contains elements from all previous pieces about the White Walkers, predominantly "Three Blasts", along with the Army of the Dead's theme.	5:26
24.	"Winter Is Here"	"The Dragon and the Wolf": Jaime leaves King's Landing as snow starts to fall on the capital. It is a slow and quiet version of the Main Theme, using predominantly a piano.	2:54
Total length:			74:20

== Credits and personnel ==
Personnel adapted from the album liner notes.

- David Benioff – liner notes
- Ramin Djawadi – composer, primary artist, producer
- D.B. Weiss – liner notes

== Charts ==
Chart (2017)	Peak position
Belgian Albums (Ultratop Flanders)	82
Belgian Albums (Ultratop Wallonia)	56
French Albums (SNEP)	149
New Zealand Heatseekers Albums (RMNZ)	4
Scottish Albums (Official Charts)	90
Spanish Albums (PROMUSICAE)	85
Swiss Albums (Schweizer Hitparade)	66
US Billboard 200	103

== Awards and nominations ==
Year	Award	Category	Nominee(s)	Result	Ref.
2018	60th Annual Grammy Awards	Best Score Soundtrack for Visual Media	Ramin Djawadi	Nominated	
2018	70th Primetime Creative Arts Emmy Awards	Outstanding Music Composition for a Series	Episode: "The Dragon and the Wolf"	Won	
