= Game of Thrones season 7 =

Game of Thrones
- Season 7
- Region 1 DVD cover
- Showrunners: David Benioff; D. B. Weiss
- Starring: Peter Dinklage; Nikolaj Coster-Waldau; Lena Headey; Emilia Clarke; Kit Harington; Aidan Gillen; Liam Cunningham; Sophie Turner; Maisie Williams; Nathalie Emmanuel; Gwendoline Christie; Conleth Hill; John Bradley; Isaac Hempstead Wright; Hannah Murray; Kristofer Hivju; Rory McCann; Iain Glen; Carice van Houten; Indira Varma; Alfie Allen; Jerome Flynn; Joe Dempsie
- No. of episodes: 7

Release
- Original network: HBO
- Original release: July 16 – August 27, 2017

Season chronology
- ← Previous; Season 6 Next → Season 8

The seventh season of the fantasy drama television series Game of Thrones premiered on HBO on July 16, 2017, and concluded on August 27, 2017. Unlike previous seasons, which consisted of ten episodes each, the seventh season consisted of only seven episodes. Like the previous season, it largely consisted of original content not found in George R. R. Martin's A Song of Ice and Fire series, while also incorporating material that Martin revealed to showrunners about the upcoming novels in the series. The series was adapted for television by David Benioff and D. B. Weiss.

The penultimate season focuses on the convergence of the show's main plots in preparation for the final season. Daenerys Targaryen arrives in Westeros with her army and three large dragons and begins to wage war against the Lannisters, who have defeated her allies in the south and west of Westeros. Jon Snow leaves Sansa in charge of Winterfell and visits Daenerys to secure her help to defeat the White Walkers and the Army of the Dead. He mines the dragonglass at Dragonstone and begins a romance with Daenerys. Arya and Bran (now the Three-Eyed Raven) return home to Winterfell; the Starks execute the treacherous Littlefinger. Tyrion persuades Daenerys not to destroy King's Landing, reminding her that she does not want to be simply a queen of ashes. Instead, Jon goes north of the wall to capture a wight to prove to Cersei that the fearsome army of the dead exist and are coming; in doing so, his group is pinned down and nearly killed. Daenerys rescues them with her dragons, but the Night King kills one of her dragons and makes it part of his army. The undead dragon later destroys part of the Wall, and the dead march through. Bran learns that Jon is really his cousin, Aegon Targaryen, the legitimate heir to the Iron Throne.

HBO ordered the seventh season on April 21, 2016, three days before the premiere of the show's sixth season and began filming on August 31, 2016. The season was filmed primarily in Northern Ireland, Spain, Croatia and Iceland. Game of Thrones features a large ensemble cast, including Peter Dinklage, Nikolaj Coster-Waldau, Lena Headey, Emilia Clarke and Kit Harington. The season introduces several new cast members, including Jim Broadbent and Tom Hopper. The series received 22 nominations for the 70th Primetime Emmy Awards and won for Outstanding Drama Series and Dinklage won for Outstanding Supporting Actor in a Drama Series.

== Episodes ==
No. overall	No. in season	Title	Directed by	Written by	Original release date	U.S. viewers (millions)
61	1	"Dragonstone"	Jeremy Podeswa	David Benioff & D. B. Weiss	July 16, 2017	10.11
At the Twins, Arya, disguised as Walder Frey, poisons the remaining lords of House Frey. The White Walkers march toward the Wall. Edd receives Bran and Meera at Castle Black. At Winterfell, Sansa objects when Jon accepts the loyalties of Houses Umber and Karstark, whose previous leaders supported Ramsay. Queen Cersei demands that the North bend the knee. At the Citadel, Samwell "borrows" restricted library books, learning there is a large deposit of dragonglass at Dragonstone; he sends word to Jon. Sam finds Jorah, now heavily infected with greyscale, quarantined in a cell. In the Riverlands, Arya meets some friendly Lannister soldiers, and "jokingly" claims she will kill Cersei. The Hound begins to believe in the Lord of Light after Thoros shows him a fiery vision of the Wall and the Army of the Dead. In King's Landing, Jaime tells Cersei they crucially need allies. Euron arrives to propose marriage in exchange for his Iron Fleet and an opportunity to kill Theon and Yara. Cersei declines over his untrustworthiness; Euron promises to return with a gift that will prove his loyalty. Daenerys arrives at Dragonstone, House Targaryen's ancestral home, with her army and large dragons.
62	2	"Stormborn"	Mark Mylod	Bryan Cogman	July 23, 2017	9.27
Daenerys heeds Tyrion's advice not to take King's Landing by force, which would kill thousands. Yara's fleet is sent to Sunspear to transport the Dornish army to lay siege to King's Landing alongside the Tyrell forces; the Unsullied are to take Casterly Rock. Daenerys challenges Varys' loyalty and threatens to burn him alive if he ever betrays her. Melisandre arrives and encourages Daenerys to invite Jon Snow to Dragonstone, saying he is integral to the war. Grey Worm and Missandei consummate their relationship. Cersei summons several lords, demanding their fealty, while Jaime offers to elevate Randyll Tarly as Warden of the South. Qyburn shows Cersei a prototype ballista capable of killing dragons. Arya is reunited with Hot Pie, who tells her the Boltons are dead and Jon is now King in the North. She resets course for Winterfell. Jon sets sails for Dragonstone to request Daenerys' help against the White Walkers, leaving Sansa in charge at Winterfell. He warns Littlefinger to never touch Sansa. Sam performs a forbidden surgery on Jorah's greyscale infection. Euron's fleet attacks Yara's, killing Obara and Nymeria and capturing Ellaria, Tyene, and Yara. Theon, experiencing flashbacks as Reek, jumps overboard.
63	3	"The Queen's Justice"	Mark Mylod	David Benioff & D. B. Weiss	July 30, 2017	9.25
Jon arrives at Dragonstone. He refuses Daenerys’ demands to bend the knee, and instead asks her help fighting the Army of the Dead. On Tyrion's advice, Daenerys allows Jon to mine the island's dragonglass. Melisandre avoids Jon and departs for Volantis, telling Varys she will return to Westeros. Bran, with Meera, arrives at Winterfell and reveals his new Three-Eyed Raven identity to Sansa. In King's Landing, Euron presents Ellaria and Tyene as gifts to Cersei, who promises him marriage after the war is won. She makes him commander of her navy. Cersei administers the same poison to Tyene that killed Myrcella; Ellaria will watch her daughter die and remain imprisoned with the body. A healed Jorah leaves Oldtown to find Daenerys. Ebrose praises Sam's skill in saving Jorah, then makes him copy old texts for his disobedience. Grey Worm and the Unsullied attack Casterly Rock but discover that Jaime has led the bulk of the Lannister forces to attack Highgarden, while Euron's fleet ambushes and destroys the Unsullied's ships. The Lannister forces quickly overwhelm Olenna Tyrell's army. Jaime offers Olenna a quick and painless death by poison. After drinking it, she reveals she poisoned Joffrey.
64	4	"The Spoils of War"	Matt Shakman	David Benioff & D. B. Weiss	August 6, 2017	10.17
Arya returns to Winterfell and is reunited with Sansa and Bran. Littlefinger presents Bran with the Valyrian steel dagger his would-be assassin used. Bran gives the dagger to Arya. Bran bids a homeward-bound Meera an unemotional farewell, explaining he is no longer Bran. Arya spars with Brienne, impressing her and amazing Sansa with her exceptional fighting skills. Cersei assures the Iron Bank full repayment of the Lannister's debt as a wagon train carrying gold from Highgarden travels to King's Landing. In a cave filled with dragonglass, Jon reveals ancient wall paintings to Daenerys depicting the First Men and the Children of the Forest joining forces against the undead. Daenerys learns that the attack on Casterly Rock was a diversion and Lannister forces have captured Highgarden. Ignoring Tyrion's protests, Daenerys rides Drogon as the Dothraki cavalry launches a surprise attack on the Lannister army, decimating it and capturing its remaining forces. Drogon is slightly wounded when Bronn fires a bolt from Qyburn's new scorpion ballista weapon, but he and Daenerys land safely. Jaime's desperate charge on horseback at a vulnerable Daenerys is thwarted by Drogon spewing fire. Bronn tackles Jaime into a river, saving him.
65	5	"Eastwatch"	Matt Shakman	Dave Hill	August 13, 2017	10.72
Jaime and Bronn return to King's Landing. Daenerys offers the surviving Lannister soldiers the choice to bend the knee or death. Randyll Tarly and his son, Dickon, refuse her offer, and against Tyrion's advice, Daenerys has Drogon incinerate them. Jorah is reunited with Daenerys at Dragonstone. Maester Wolkan alerts Jon and the Citadel about the wights approaching Eastwatch. Tyrion proposes capturing a wight beyond the Wall to prove their existence and convince Cersei to accept a temporary alliance. Davos smuggles Tyrion inside King's Landing to secretly meet with Jaime to propose an armistice. Cersei accepts, and she also informs Jaime she is pregnant with their child. While in King's Landing, Davos finds Gendry and takes him back to Dragonstone. With the Citadel ignoring Maester Wolkan's warning letter, Sam, frustrated, leaves the Citadel with Gilly and Little Sam, taking several restricted books with him. At Winterfell, Littlefinger, knowing Arya is spying on him, lures her into finding the letter that Sansa was forced to write as a hostage in King's Landing. Jon, Jorah, and Gendry take the Hound, Thoros, Beric, Tormund and a group of the Free Folk from Eastwatch North beyond the Wall to capture a wight.
66	6	"Beyond the Wall"	Alan Taylor	David Benioff & D. B. Weiss	August 20, 2017	10.24
At Winterfell, Littlefinger schemes to isolate Sansa. Tensions between Arya and Sansa increase after Arya discovers the letter Sansa was forced to write, begging for Robb's fealty to Joffrey. Sansa, in turn, finds Arya's collection of faces from Braavos. At Dragonstone, Tyrion counsels Daenerys about the upcoming negotiations with Cersei. Beyond the Wall, Jon and the men hunt for a wight to prove the White Walkers' existence. After capturing one, the group is beset by the White Walker army but not before Jon sends Gendry to Eastwatch to dispatch a raven to Daenerys requesting help. During the night, an injured Thoros freezes to death. As the wight army is about to overwhelm Jon's group, Daenerys arrives with her dragons, destroying many wights. The Night King, the White Walkers' leader, kills Viserion, one of Daenerys' dragons, with an ice spear. Daenerys flies off with the men, but is unable to rescue Jon. Benjen Stark intervenes and sacrifices himself to save Jon. When Jon and Daenerys are reunited, Jon pledges himself and the North to Daenerys as Queen. The Night King reanimates Viserion, making the dragon a part of his army.
67	7	"The Dragon and the Wolf"	Jeremy Podeswa	David Benioff & D. B. Weiss	August 27, 2017	12.07
The wight is presented to the Lannister court. Cersei demands Jon's neutrality, but she storms off when Jon upholds his oath to Daenerys. Tyrion meets with Cersei, apparently gaining her alliance. Cersei reveals to Jaime that she instead will use the Golden Company of Braavos to secure her hold on Westeros and allow the White Walkers to destroy Daenerys and Jon's armies. Disgusted, Jaime rides north to warn Jon and Daenerys. At Dragonstone, Theon wins his men's respect and leads them to rescue Yara. Aboard a North-bound ship, Jon seeks out Daenerys, and they become lovers. At Winterfell, Littlefinger works to increase dissent between Arya and Sansa. Sansa, Arya, and Bran publicly accuse Littlefinger of murdering Jon and Lysa Arryn and of treason against their father. Deserted by the Lords of the Vale, Littlefinger is executed by Arya. Samwell arrives and meets with Bran. Combining Sam's earlier information and Bran's vision, they realize Jon is Aegon Targaryen, the legitimate heir to the Iron Throne. Jon's parents, Rhaegar Targaryen and Lyanna Stark, secretly married. At Eastwatch, the Night King, astride the undead Viserion, blasts a hole through the Wall with blue dragon fire; the Army of the Dead marches through.

== Cast ==
=== Main cast ===
- Peter Dinklage as Tyrion Lannister
- Nikolaj Coster-Waldau as Jaime Lannister
- Lena Headey as Cersei Lannister
- Emilia Clarke as Daenerys Targaryen
- Kit Harington as Jon Snow
- Aidan Gillen as Petyr "Littlefinger" Baelish
- Liam Cunningham as Davos Seaworth
- Sophie Turner as Sansa Stark
- Maisie Williams as Arya Stark
- Nathalie Emmanuel as Missandei
- Gwendoline Christie as Brienne of Tarth
- Conleth Hill as Varys
- John Bradley as Samwell Tarly
- Isaac Hempstead Wright as Bran Stark
- Hannah Murray as Gilly
- Kristofer Hivju as Tormund Giantsbane
- Rory McCann as Sandor "The Hound" Clegane
- Iain Glen as Jorah Mormont
- Carice van Houten as Melisandre
- Indira Varma as Ellaria Sand
- Alfie Allen as Theon Greyjoy
- Jerome Flynn as Bronn
- Joe Dempsie as Gendry

=== Guest cast ===
The recurring actors listed here are those who appeared in season 7. They are listed by the region in which they first appear.

==== In the North, including the Wall ====
- Richard Dormer as Beric Dondarrion
- Paul Kaye as Thoros of Myr
- Ben Crompton as Eddison Tollett
- Ellie Kendrick as Meera Reed
- Bella Ramsey as Lyanna Mormont
- Tim McInnerny as Robett Glover
- Megan Parkinson as Alys Karstark
- Daniel Portman as Podrick Payne
- Richard Rycroft as Maester Wolkan
- Rupert Vansittart as Yohn Royce

==== Beyond the Wall ====
- Vladimir Furdik as the Night King
- Joseph Mawle as Benjen Stark
- Neil Fingleton as giant wight
- Ian Whyte as giant wight

==== In the Riverlands ====
- David Bradley as Walder Frey
- Ben Hawkey as Hot Pie

==== In King's Landing ====
- Pilou Asbæk as Euron Greyjoy
- Anton Lesser as Qyburn
- Hafþór Júlíus Björnsson as Gregor Clegane
- James Faulkner as Randyll Tarly
- Tom Hopper as Dickon Tarly
- Mark Gatiss as Tycho Nestoris

==== In Oldtown ====
- Jim Broadbent as Archmaester Ebrose

==== At Dragonstone ====
- Jacob Anderson as Grey Worm
- Diana Rigg as Olenna Tyrell
- Gemma Whelan as Yara Greyjoy
- Jessica Henwick as Nymeria Sand
- Rosabell Laurenti Sellers as Tyene Sand
- Keisha Castle-Hughes as Obara Sand
- Brendan Cowell as Harrag
- Staz Nair as Qhono

==== In flashbacks ====
- Aisling Franciosi as Lyanna Stark
- Wilf Scolding as Rhaegar Targaryen
- Robert Aramayo as Eddard Stark

== Production ==
=== Crew ===
Series creators and executive producers David Benioff and D. B. Weiss serve as showrunners for the seventh season. The directors for the seventh season are Jeremy Podeswa (episodes 1 and 7), Mark Mylod (episodes 2 and 3), Matt Shakman (episodes 4 and 5) and Alan Taylor (episode 6). This marks Taylor's return to the series after an absence since the second season. Shakman is a first-time Game of Thrones director, with the rest each having directed multiple episodes in previous seasons. Michele Clapton returned to the show as costume designer, after spending some time away from the show in the sixth season. She previously worked on the show for the first five seasons, as well as the end of the sixth season.

=== Writing ===
The seventh season contains original material not found in the A Song of Ice and Fire series. Some of the show's sixth season also consists of material revealed to the writers of the television series during discussions with Martin.

=== Filming ===
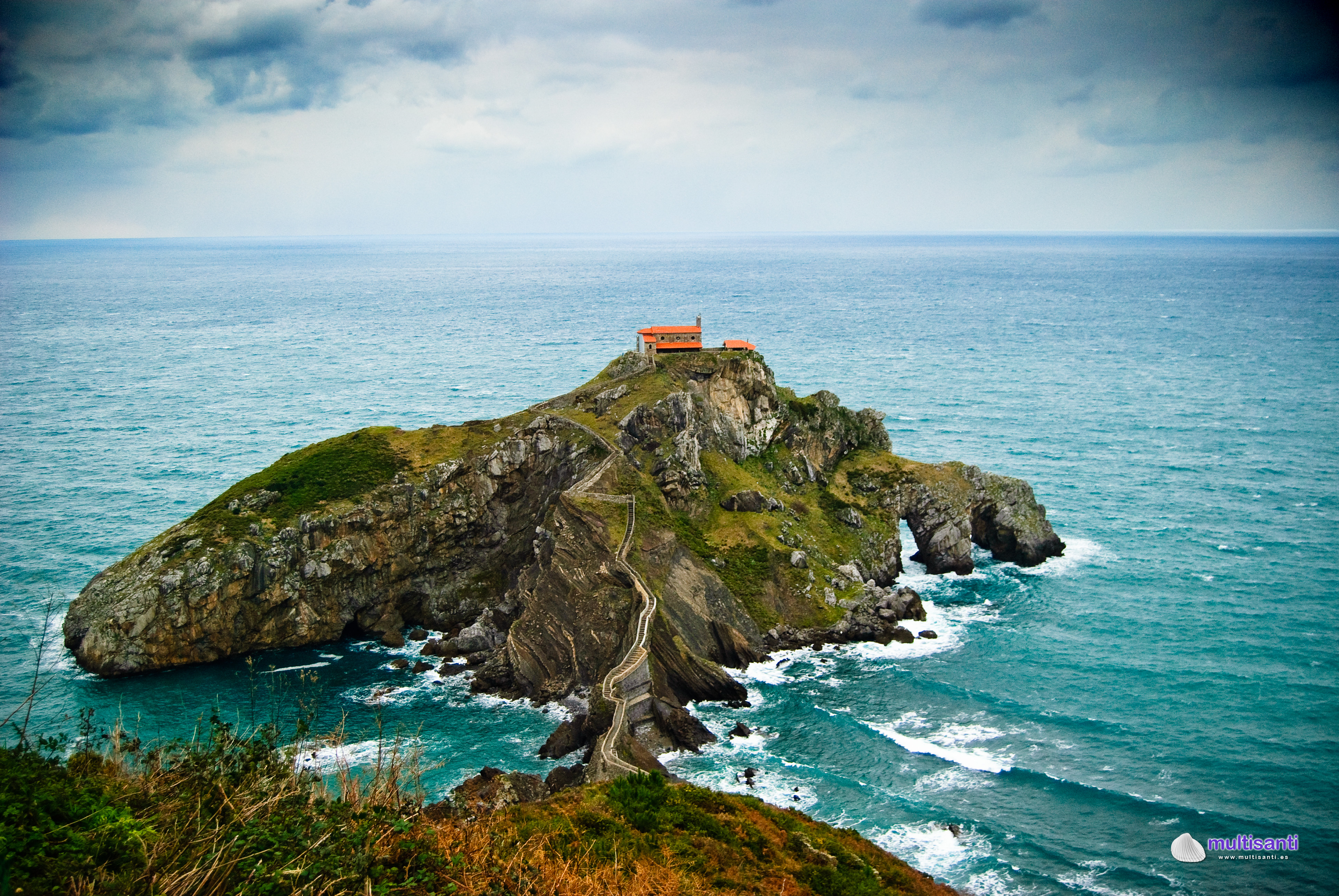
The shores of Gaztelugatxe were used as a location for filming Season 7.

Filming began on August 31, 2016, at Titanic Studios in Belfast, and ended in February 2017. In an interview with the showrunners, it was announced that the filming of the seventh season would be delayed until later in the year due to necessary weather conditions for filming. The showrunners stated "We're starting a bit later because, you know, at the end of this season, winter is here, and that means that sunny weather doesn't really serve our purposes any more. We kind of pushed everything down the line so we could get some grim, gray weather even in the sunnier places that we shoot."

Girona, Spain, did not return as one of the filming locations. Girona stood in for Braavos and parts of King's Landing. It was later announced that the seventh season would film in Northern Ireland, Spain and Iceland, with filming in Northern Ireland beginning in August 2016. The series filmed in the Spanish cities Seville, Cáceres, Almodóvar del Río, Santiponce, Zumaia and Bermeo. Spanish sources announced that the series would be filming the seventh season on Muriola Beach in Barrika, Las Atarazanas, the Royal Dockyards of Seville and at the shores of San Juan de Gaztelugatxe, an islet belonging to the city of Bermeo. The series returned to film at The Dark Hedges in Stranocum, which was previously used as the Kingsroad in the second season. Some scenes were filmed in Iceland. Filming also occurred in Dubrovnik, Croatia, which is used for location of King's Landing. The scene where Arya was reunited with Nymeria was filmed in Alberta, Canada.

=== Casting ===
Deadline reported on June 21, 2016, that the five main cast members, Peter Dinklage, Nikolaj Coster-Waldau, Lena Headey, Emilia Clarke, and Kit Harington had been in contract negotiations for the final two seasons. It was reported that the cast members have increased their salary to $500,000 per episode for the seventh and eighth season. It was later reported that the actors had gone through a renegotiation, for which they had increased their salary to $1.1 million per episode for the last two seasons.

On August 31, 2016, Entertainment Weekly reported that Jim Broadbent had been cast for the seventh season in a "significant" role. It was announced that the role of Dickon Tarly has been recast, with Tom Hopper replacing Freddie Stroma, who had previously played the role in "Blood of My Blood". The seventh season sees the return of Mark Gatiss as Tycho Nestoris, who did not appear in the sixth season, Ben Hawkey as Hot Pie, who last appeared in the fourth season, and Joe Dempsie as Gendry, who last appeared in the third season and maintains his status as starring cast member. Members of the British indie pop band Bastille were reported to have filmed cameo appearances. British singer-songwriter Ed Sheeran also makes a cameo appearance in the season. Frontman of American heavy metal band Mastodon, Brent Hinds, has also revealed he would have a cameo appearance. This is Hinds' second cameo in the series, following his appearance (along with bandmates Brann Dailor and Bill Kelliher) in the fifth season. New York Mets baseball pitcher Noah Syndergaard made a background cameo as a javelin-throwing Lannister soldier in "The Spoils of War."

=== Episodes ===
On April 21, 2016, HBO officially ordered the seventh season of Game of Thrones, just three days prior to the premiere of the show's sixth season. In a June 2016 interview with Variety, co-creators David Benioff and D. B. Weiss revealed the seventh season would likely consist of fewer episodes, stating at the time of the interview that they were "down to our final 13 episodes after this season. We're heading into the final lap." Director Jack Bender, who worked on the show's sixth season, said that the seventh season would consist of seven episodes. Benioff and Weiss stated that they were unable to produce 10 episodes in the show's usual 12 to 14 month time frame, as Weiss said "It's crossing out of a television schedule into more of a mid-range movie schedule." HBO confirmed on July 18, 2016, that the seventh season would consist of seven episodes, and would premiere later than usual in mid-2017 because of the later filming schedule. Later it was confirmed that the season would debut on July 16. The seventh season includes an 81-minute finale; this was the series' longest episode until it was surpassed by the Season 8 episode "The Long Night", which is 82 minutes. Season 7's penultimate episode also runs for 71 minutes – around 16 minutes longer than an average Game of Thrones episode. The first five episodes mostly run longer than average (55 minutes), at 59, 59, 63, 50, and 59 minutes respectively. The previous longest episode in the series was the sixth-season finale, "The Winds of Winter", which ran for 69 minutes.

=== Music ===
Ramin Djawadi returned as the composer of the show for the seventh season.

== Reception ==
=== Critical response ===
Game of Thrones season 7: Critical reception by episode
Season 7 (2017): Percentage of positive critics' reviews tracked by the website Rotten Tomatoes

On Metacritic, the season (based on the first episode) has a score of 77 out of 100 based on 12 reviews, indicating "generally favorable" reviews. On Rotten Tomatoes, the seventh season has a 93% approval rating from 479 critics with an average rating of 8.2 out of 10, with the site's consensus reading, "After a year-long wait, Game of Thrones roars back with powerful storytelling and a focused interest in its central characters—particularly the female ones."

=== Ratings ===
The series premiere surpassed 30 million viewers across all of the network's domestic platforms weeks after its release. The show's numbers continued to climb in other countries as well. In the UK, the premiere got up to 4.7 million viewers after seven days, setting a new record for Sky Atlantic. Compared to the previous season, HBO Asia saw an increases of between 24 percent to 50 percent. HBO Latin America saw a record viewership in the region, with a 29 percent climb. In Germany, the show went up 210 percent, in Russia it climbed 40 percent and in Italy it saw a 61 percent increase. In the United States, the finale was watched by 12.1 million viewers on its first airing on television, and 16.5 million when viewings on HBO Now and HBO Go apps are included. Over the season, the viewer numbers averaged at over 30 million per episode across all platforms.

Viewership and ratings per episode of Game of Thrones season 7
No.	Title	Air date	Rating (18–49)	Viewers (millions)	DVR (18–49)	DVR viewers (millions)	Total (18–49)	Total viewers (millions)
1	"Dragonstone"	July 16, 2017	4.7	10.11	1.1	2.62	5.8	12.74
2	"Stormborn"	July 23, 2017	4.3	9.27	1.4	3.08	5.7	12.37
3	"The Queen's Justice"	July 30, 2017	4.3	9.25	1.1	2.72	5.4	11.97^{1}
4	"The Spoils of War"	August 6, 2017	4.6	10.17	1.7	3.76	6.3	13.94
5	"Eastwatch"	August 13, 2017	5.0	10.72	1.6	3.67	6.6	14.41
6	"Beyond the Wall"	August 20, 2017	4.7	10.24	1.6	3.74	6.3	13.98
7	"The Dragon and the Wolf"	August 27, 2017	5.7	12.07	1.4	3.35	7.1	15.44

^1 Live +7 ratings were not available, so Live +3 ratings have been used instead.

== Accolades ==
Year	Award	Category	Nominee(s)	Result	Ref.
2017	American Film Institute Awards 2017	AFI TV Award	Game of Thrones	Won	
2017	2017 American Society of Cinematographers Awards	Outstanding Achievement in Cinematography in Regular Series for Non-Commercial Television	Robert McLachlan (for "The Spoils of War")	Nominated	
2017	2017 American Society of Cinematographers Awards	Outstanding Achievement in Cinematography in Regular Series for Non-Commercial Television	Gregory Middleton (for "Dragonstone")	Nominated	
2017	IGN Awards	Best Action Series	Game of Thrones	Won	
2017	IGN Awards	Best TV Episode	"The Spoils of War"	Won	
2017	IGN People's Choice Award	Best Action Series	Game of Thrones	Won	
2017	IGN People's Choice Award	Best TV Episode	"The Spoils of War"	Won	
2017	Humanitas Prize	60 Minute Network or Syndicated Television	David Benioff, D. B. Weiss (for "The Dragon and the Wolf")	Nominated	
2017	Hollywood Post Alliance	Outstanding Color Grading	Joe Finley (for "Dragonstone")	Nominated	
2017	Hollywood Post Alliance	Outstanding Editing	Tim Porter (for "Stormborn")	Nominated	
2017	Hollywood Post Alliance	Outstanding Editing	Jesse Parker (for "The Queen's Justice")	Nominated	
2017	Hollywood Post Alliance	Outstanding Editing	Crispin Green (for "Dragonstone")	Nominated	
2017	Hollywood Post Alliance	Outstanding Sound	Tim Kimmel, Paula Fairfield, Mathew Waters, Onnalee Blank, Bradley C. Katona, Paul Bercovitch (for "The Spoils of War")	Nominated	
2018	22nd Satellite Awards	Best Genre Series	Game of Thrones	Won	
2018	23rd National Television Awards	Best Drama	Game of Thrones	Nominated	
2018	8th Critics' Choice Television Awards	Best Drama Series	Game of Thrones	Nominated	
2018	8th Critics' Choice Television Awards	Best Supporting Actor in a Drama Series	Peter Dinklage	Nominated	
2018	8th Critics' Choice Television Awards	Best Supporting Actress in a Drama Series	Emilia Clarke	Nominated	
2018	75th Golden Globe Awards	Best Television Series – Drama	Game of Thrones	Nominated	
2018	24th Screen Actors Guild Awards	Outstanding Performance by an Ensemble in a Drama Series	Game of Thrones	Nominated	
2018	24th Screen Actors Guild Awards	Outstanding Action Performance by a Stunt Ensemble in a Television Series	Game of Thrones	Won	
2018	24th Screen Actors Guild Awards	Outstanding Performance by a Male Actor in a Drama Series	Peter Dinklage	Nominated	
2018	60th Annual Grammy Awards	Best Score Soundtrack for Visual Media	Ramin Djawadi	Nominated	
2018	American Cinema Editors Awards 2018	Best Edited Drama Series for Non-Commercial Television	Tim Porter (for "Beyond the Wall")	Nominated	
2018	45th Annie Awards	Outstanding Achievement, Character Animation in a Live Action Production	Paul Story, Todd Labonte, Matthew Muntean, Cajun Hylton, Georgy Arevshatov (for "Beyond the Wall")	Nominated	
2018	Art Directors Guild Awards 2017	One-Hour Single Camera Period Or Fantasy Television Series	Deborah Riley (for "Dragonstone", "The Queen's Justice", and "Eastwatch")	Won	
2018	Cinema Audio Society Awards 2017	Outstanding Achievement in Sound Mixing – Television Series – One Hour	Ronan Hill, Richard Dyer, Onnalee Blank, Mathew Waters, Brett Voss (for "Beyond the Wall")	Won	
2018	Costume Designers Guild Awards 2017	Outstanding Fantasy Television Series	Michele Clapton	Won	
2018	70th Directors Guild of America Awards	Dramatic Series	Jeremy Podeswa (for "The Dragon and the Wolf")	Nominated	
2018	70th Directors Guild of America Awards	Dramatic Series	Matt Shakman (for "The Spoils of War")	Nominated	
2018	70th Directors Guild of America Awards	Dramatic Series	Alan Taylor (for "Beyond the Wall")	Nominated	
2018	Make-Up Artists and Hair Stylists Guild	Best Period and/or Character Makeup – Television	Jane Walker, Nicola Matthews	Won	
2018	Make-Up Artists and Hair Stylists Guild	Best Period and/or Character Hair Styling – Television	Kevin Alexander, Candice Banks	Nominated	
2018	Make-Up Artists and Hair Stylists Guild	Best Special Makeup Effects – Television	Barrie Gower, Sarah Gower	Won	
2018	Producers Guild of America Awards 2017	"The Norman Felton Award for Outstanding Producer of Episodic Television, Drama"	David Benioff, D. B. Weiss, Bernadette Caulfield, Frank Doelger, Carolyn Strauss, Bryan Cogman, Lisa McAtackney, Chris Newman, Greg Spence	Nominated	
2018	Writers Guild of America Awards 2017	Television Drama Series	David Benioff, Bryan Cogman, Dave Hill, D. B. Weiss	Nominated	
2018	16th Visual Effects Society Awards	Outstanding Visual Effects in a Photoreal Episode	Joe Bauer, Steve Kullback, Chris Baird, David Ramos, Sam Conway (for "Beyond the Wall")	Won	
2018	16th Visual Effects Society Awards	Outstanding Animated Character in an Episode or Real-Time Project	Paul Story, Todd Labonte, Matthew Muntean, Nicholas Wilson (for "Beyond the Wall" – "Zombie Polar Bear")	Nominated	
2018	16th Visual Effects Society Awards	Outstanding Animated Character in an Episode or Real-Time Project	Jonathan Symmonds, Thomas Kutschera, Philipp Winterstein, Andreas Krieg (for "Eastwatch" – "Drogon Meets Jon")	Nominated	
2018	16th Visual Effects Society Awards	Outstanding Animated Character in an Episode or Real-Time Project	Murray Stevenson, Jason Snyman, Jenn Taylor, Florian Friedmann (for "The Spoils of War" – "Drogon Loot Train Attack")	Won	
2018	16th Visual Effects Society Awards	Outstanding Created Environment in an Episode, Commercial or Real-Time Project	Daniel Villalba, Antonio Lado, José Luis Barreiro, Isaac de la Pompa (for "Beyond the Wall" – "Frozen Lake")	Won	
2018	16th Visual Effects Society Awards	Outstanding Created Environment in an Episode, Commercial or Real-Time Project	Patrice Poissant, Deak Ferrand, Dominic Daigle, Gabriel Morin (for "Eastwatch")	Nominated	
2018	16th Visual Effects Society Awards	Outstanding Effects Simulations in an Episode, Commercial, or Real-Time Project	Manuel Ramírez, Óscar Márquez, Pablo Hernández, David Gacituaga (for "Beyond the Wall" – "Frozen Lake")	Nominated	
2018	16th Visual Effects Society Awards	Outstanding Effects Simulations in an Episode, Commercial, or Real-Time Project	Thomas Hullin, Dominik Kirouac, Sylvain Nouveau, Nathan Arbuckle (for "The Dragon and the Wolf" – "Wall Destruction")	Won	
2018	16th Visual Effects Society Awards	Outstanding Compositing in a Photoreal Episode	Óscar Perea, Santiago Martos, David Esteve, Michael Crane (for "Beyond the Wall" – "Frozen Lake")	Nominated	
2018	16th Visual Effects Society Awards	Outstanding Compositing in a Photoreal Episode	Thomas Montminy Brodeur, Xavier Fourmond, Reuben Barkataki, Sébastien Raets (for "Eastwatch")	Nominated	
2018	16th Visual Effects Society Awards	Outstanding Compositing in a Photoreal Episode	Dom Hellier, Thijs Noij, Edwin Holdsworth, Giacomo Matteucci (for "The Spoils of War" – "Loot Train Attack")	Won	
2018	Golden Reel Awards	Outstanding Achievement in Sound Editing - Episodic Short Form – Effects/Foley	Tim Kimmel, Paula Fairfield, Bradley Katona, Brett Voss and Jeffrey Wilhoit (for "The Spoils of War")	Won	
2018	Golden Reel Awards	Outstanding Achievement in Sound Editing - Episodic Short Form – Dialogue/ADR	Tim Kimmel, Paul Bercovitch and Tim Hands (for "The Spoils of War")	Won	
2018	Golden Reel Awards	Outstanding Achievement in Sound Editing - Episodic Short Form – Music/Musical	David Klotz (for "Beyond the Wall")	Nominated	
2018	15th Irish Film & Television Awards	Best Television Drama	Game of Thrones	Won	
2018	15th Irish Film & Television Awards	Actor in a Supporting Role – Television	Liam Cunningham	Won	
2018	15th Irish Film & Television Awards	Actor in a Supporting Role – Television	Aidan Gillen	Nominated	
2018	15th Irish Film & Television Awards	Best Sound	Ronan Hill, Onnalee Blank and Matthew Waters	Nominated	
2018	15th Irish Film & Television Awards	Best VFX	Ed Bruce & Nicholas Murphy	Nominated	
2018	5th Location Managers Guild Awards	Outstanding Locations in a Period Television Series	Robert Boake, Matt Jones, Tate Araez Guzman	Won	
2018	44th Saturn Awards	Best Fantasy Television Series	Game of Thrones	Nominated	
2018	44th Saturn Awards	Best Actress on a Television Series	Lena Headey	Nominated	
2018	44th Saturn Awards	Best Supporting Actor on a Television Series	Kit Harington	Nominated	
2018	44th Saturn Awards	Best Supporting Actor on a Television Series	Nikolaj Coster-Waldau	Nominated	
2018	2018 British Academy Television Awards	Must-See Moment	"Viserion is Killed by the Night King" (for Beyond the Wall)	Nominated	
2018	2018 British Academy Television Craft Awards	Costume Design	Michele Clapton	Won	
2018	2018 British Academy Television Craft Awards	Production Design	Deborah Riley, Rob Cameron	Won	
2018	2018 British Academy Television Craft Awards	Special Award	Game of Thrones	Won	
2018	Webby Award	Best Overall Social Presence	Game of Thrones	Won	
2018	Webby Award	Best Trailer	Game of Thrones	Won	
2018	Webby Award	Best Digital Campaign	Game of Thrones	Won	
2018	2018 MTV Movie & TV Awards	Best Show	Game of Thrones	Nominated	
2018	2018 MTV Movie & TV Awards	Best Performance in a Show	Maisie Williams	Nominated	
2018	2018 MTV Movie & TV Awards	Best Hero	Emilia Clarke	Nominated	
2018	2018 Gold Derby Awards	Best Drama Series	Game of Thrones	Won	
2018	2018 Gold Derby Awards	Ensemble of the Year	The cast of Game of Thrones	Nominated	
2018	2018 Gold Derby Awards	Best Drama Supporting Actor	Peter Dinklage	Nominated	
2018	2018 Gold Derby Awards	Best Drama Supporting Actress	Lena Headey	Nominated	
2018	2018 Gold Derby Awards	Best Drama Guest Actress	Diana Rigg	Won	
2018	2018 Gold Derby Awards	Best Drama Episode	"Beyond the Wall"	Nominated	
2018	2018 Gold Derby Awards	Best Drama Episode	"The Spoils of War"	Nominated	
2018	70th Primetime Emmy Awards	Outstanding Drama Series		Won	
2018	70th Primetime Emmy Awards	Outstanding Supporting Actor in a Drama Series	Nikolaj Coster-Waldau	Nominated	
2018	70th Primetime Emmy Awards	Outstanding Supporting Actor in a Drama Series	Peter Dinklage	Won	
2018	70th Primetime Emmy Awards	Outstanding Supporting Actress in a Drama Series	Lena Headey	Nominated	
2018	70th Primetime Emmy Awards	Outstanding Directing for a Drama Series	Alan Taylor (for "Beyond the Wall")	Nominated	
2018	70th Primetime Emmy Awards	Outstanding Directing for a Drama Series	Jeremy Podeswa (for "The Dragon and the Wolf")	Nominated	
2018	70th Primetime Emmy Awards	Outstanding Writing for a Drama Series	David Benioff and D. B. Weiss (for "The Dragon and the Wolf")	Nominated	
2018	70th Primetime Creative Arts Emmy Awards	Outstanding Casting for a Drama Series	Nina Gold, Robert Sterne, and Carla Stronge	Nominated	
2018	70th Primetime Creative Arts Emmy Awards	Outstanding Costumes for a Fantasy/Sci-Fi Series	Michele Clapton, Alexander Fordham, Emma O'Loughlin, Kate O'Farrell, (for "Beyond the Wall")	Won	
2018	70th Primetime Creative Arts Emmy Awards	Outstanding Guest Actress in a Drama Series	Diana Rigg	Nominated	
2018	70th Primetime Creative Arts Emmy Awards	Outstanding Hairstyling for a Single-Camera Series	Kevin Alexander, Candice Banks, Nicola Mount, Rosalia Culora (for "The Dragon and the Wolf")	Nominated	
2018	70th Primetime Creative Arts Emmy Awards	Outstanding Make-up for a Single-Camera Series (Non-Prosthetic)	Jane Walker, Kay Bilk, Marianna Kyriacou, Pamela Smyth, Kate Thompson, Nicola Mathews (for "The Dragon and the Wolf")	Nominated	
2018	70th Primetime Creative Arts Emmy Awards	Outstanding Production Design for a Fantasy Program	Deborah Riley, Paul Ghirardani, Rob Cameron (for "Dragonstone")	Won	
2018	70th Primetime Creative Arts Emmy Awards	Outstanding Prosthetic Makeup for a Series	Jane Walker, Paul Spateri, Emma Sheffield, Barrie Gower (for "Beyond the Wall")	Won	
2018	70th Primetime Creative Arts Emmy Awards	Outstanding Single-Camera Picture Editing for a Drama Series	Tim Porter (for Beyond the Wall)	Nominated	
2018	70th Primetime Creative Arts Emmy Awards	Outstanding Single-Camera Picture Editing for a Drama Series	Crispin Green (for "The Spoils of War")	Nominated	
2018	70th Primetime Creative Arts Emmy Awards	Outstanding Single-Camera Picture Editing for a Drama Series	Katie Weiland (for "The Dragon and the Wolf")	Nominated	
2018	70th Primetime Creative Arts Emmy Awards	Outstanding Music Composition for a Series (Original Dramatic Score)	Ramin Djawadi (for "The Dragon and the Wolf")	Won	
2018	70th Primetime Creative Arts Emmy Awards	Outstanding Sound Editing for a Comedy or Drama series	Tim Kimmel, Paula Fairfield, Tim Hands, Paul Bercovitch, Bradley C. Katona, John Matter, Brett Voss, David Klotz, Jeffrey Wilhoit, Dylan T. Wilhoit (for "The Spoils of War")	Nominated	
2018	70th Primetime Creative Arts Emmy Awards	Outstanding Sound Mixing for a Series	Onnalee Blank, Mathew Waters, Richard Dyer, Ronan Hill (for "Beyond the Wall")	Won	
2018	70th Primetime Creative Arts Emmy Awards	Outstanding Special Visual Effects	Steve Kullback, Joe Bauer, Adam Chazen, Michelle Blok, Sam Conway, Ted Rae, David Ramos, Wayne Stables, Derek Spears (for "Beyond the Wall")	Won	
2018	70th Primetime Creative Arts Emmy Awards	Outstanding Stunt Coordination for a Series	Rowley Irlam	Won	
2018	Asian Academy Creative Awards	Best Visual or Special FX in a TV Series	Method Studios (for "The Spoils of War")	Won	

== Release ==
=== Broadcast ===
The season was simulcast around the world by HBO and its broadcast partners in 186 countries. In some countries, it aired the day after its first release.

=== Marketing ===
On July 23, 2016, a teaser production trailer was released by HBO at the 2016 San Diego Comic-Con. The trailer mostly consisted of voice overs, and shots of crew members creating sets and props. The first footage from the season was revealed in a new promotional video released by HBO highlighting its new and returning original shows for the coming year on November 28, 2016, showcasing Jon Snow, Sansa Stark and Arya Stark.

On March 1, 2017, HBO and Game of Thrones teamed up with Major League Baseball (MLB) for a cross-promotional partnership. At least 19 individual teams participated in this promotion. On March 8, 2017, HBO released the first promotional poster for the season ahead of the SXSW Festival in Austin, Texas, which teases the battle of "ice vs. fire". Showrunners Benioff and Weiss also spoke at the event, along with fellow cast members Sophie Turner and Maisie Williams.

On March 9, 2017, HBO hosted a live stream on the Game of Thrones Facebook page that revealed the premiere date for the seventh season as being July 16, 2017. It was accompanied by a teaser trailer. On March 30, 2017, the first official promo for the show was released, highlighting the thrones of Daenerys Targaryen, Jon Snow, and Cersei Lannister. On April 20, 2017, HBO released 15 official photos shot during the season. On May 22, 2017, HBO released several new photos from the new season. On May 23, 2017, HBO released the official posters featuring the Night King. The first official trailer for season 7 was released on May 24, 2017. The trailer set a world record for being the most viewed show trailer ever, being viewed 61 million times across digital platforms, in the first 24 hours. The second official trailer was released on June 21, 2017. The season premiere was screened at the Walt Disney Concert Hall in Los Angeles on July 12, 2017.

=== Home media ===
The season was released on Blu-ray and DVD in region 1 on December 12, 2017.

=== Illegal distribution ===
The season premiere was pirated 90 million times in the first three days after it aired. On August 4, 2017, it was reported that, two days before its original broadcast, the fourth episode of the season was leaked online from Star India, one of HBO's international network partners. The leaked copy has the "for internal viewing only" watermark. On July 31, 2017, due to a security breach, HBO was the victim of 1.5 terabytes of stolen data. However, "this was not related to this episode leak", according to The Verge. On August 16, 2017, four days before its intended release, it was reported that HBO Spain and HBO Nordic accidentally allowed the sixth episode of the series on-demand viewing for one hour before being removed.

Data from piracy monitoring firm MUSO indicates that season seven was pirated more than one billion times mostly by unauthorized streaming, with torrent and direct downloads accounting for about 15 percent of this piracy. On average, each episode is estimated to have been pirated 140 million times, making Game of Thrones the most-pirated television series in 2017.
