= The Dragon and the Wolf =

- Game of Thrones episode
- Episode no.: Season 7 Episode 7
- Directed by: Jeremy Podeswa
- Written by: David Benioff; D. B. Weiss
- Cinematography by: Gregory Middleton
- Editing by: Crispin Green
- Original air date: August 27, 2017
- Running time: 79 minutes

Guest appearances
- Pilou Asbæk as Euron Greyjoy; Richard Dormer as Beric Dondarrion; Jacob Anderson as Grey Worm; Staz Nair as Qhono; Anton Lesser as Qyburn; Hafþór Júlíus Björnsson as Ser Gregor Clegane; Daniel Portman as Podrick Payne; Rupert Vansittart as Yohn Royce; Aisling Franciosi as Lyanna Stark; Brendan Cowell as Harrag; Robert Aramayo as young Ned Stark; Richard Rycroft as Maester Wolkan; Wilf Scolding as Rhaegar Targaryen; Tom Chadbon as High Septon Maynard; Guy Oliver-Watts as Lannister soldier; Neil Fingleton as wight giant; Ian Whyte as a wight giant; William Wilson as Baby Sam; James Wilson as Baby Sam; Brent Hinds as a white walker (uncredited); Bill Kelliher as a white walker (uncredited)

Episode chronology
← Previous "Beyond the Wall"	Next → "Winterfell"
- Game of Thrones season 7

"The Dragon and the Wolf" is the seventh and final episode of the seventh season of HBO's fantasy television series Game of Thrones, and the 67th episode overall. It was written by series co-creators David Benioff and D. B. Weiss, and directed by Jeremy Podeswa. The title of the episode refers to the sigils of House Targaryen (the Dragon) and House Stark (the Wolf) and their newfound alliance.

The episode's plot includes a negotiation between Cersei and Daenerys, and a rift between Cersei and Jaime; Theon rededicates himself to Yara; Sansa and Arya unite against Littlefinger; Jon Snow is revealed to be the child of Lyanna Stark and Rhaegar Targaryen; Jon and Daenerys's romantic relationship comes to fruition; and the Army of the Dead penetrates the Wall.

"The Dragon and the Wolf" received a positive reception from critics, with many praising the role and development of Cersei Lannister, as well as Aidan Gillen's performance as Littlefinger, the Dragonpit meeting, and the final scene, though the pacing was met with mixed reviews, and criticism was also leveled at the resemblance of Rhaegar Targaryen to his brother Viserys Targaryen. In the United States, the episode achieved a viewership of 12.07 million in its initial broadcast, making it the highest-rated episode of the series at the time.

The episode received eight nominations at the 70th Primetime Emmy Awards – making it the most Emmy Award-nominated episode of the series to date –, including for its writing, direction, music, and the performances of Peter Dinklage and Lena Headey, with Djawadi and Dinklage winning in their categories. This episode marks the final appearance of Aidan Gillen (Petyr "Littlefinger" Baelish) and Ned Stark.

== Plot ==
=== In King's Landing ===
Cersei, Daenerys, and their entourages meet in the ruined Dragonpit, and Jon and the Hound present the captured wight to prove the existence of the White Walkers. Cersei pledges her assistance on the condition that Jon remains neutral between the queens, but retracts her support when Jon affirms he has already sworn himself to Daenerys and returns to the Red Keep. Brienne appeals to Jaime to make Cersei reconsider. Tyrion goes alone to confront Cersei. He explains to Cersei that Daenerys wanted to destroy King's Landing until Tyrion persuaded her not to. During their conversation, he realizes Cersei is pregnant. Cersei returns to the parley and agrees to send her entire army north to fight the White Walkers.

Later, Jaime prepares to mobilize the army, but Cersei reveals that she lied and will not join Daenerys and Jon's cause. Euron, who had claimed to be fleeing the threat of the dead, is revealed to have actually gone to Essos to transport the Golden Company, with which Cersei will fight whoever prevails in the Long Night. Jaime is disgusted; Cersei threatens to have the Mountain kill him, but ultimately relents. Jaime departs King's Landing riding North alone as snow begins to fall on the city.

=== At Dragonstone ===
Daenerys' allies make plans to travel to Winterfell. Daenerys decides to travel with Jon, in hopes of garnering popular support amongst the Northmen. Later, Theon seeks guidance from Jon, who declares they both preserve Ned's legacy. Theon decides to save Yara. Challenged to a fight by Harrag, the leader of the remaining Ironborn, Theon ultimately prevails and rallies the Ironborn to his cause.

=== At Winterfell ===
Sansa and Littlefinger discuss Arya's actions. Littlefinger advises Sansa to always assume others have the worst possible motive. Sansa summons Arya before the lords of the North and Vale, but then stuns Littlefinger by accusing him of murdering Jon Arryn, betraying Ned Stark, starting the entire war, and murdering Lysa Arryn. Though Littlefinger admits that he killed Lysa to save Sansa's life, he denies the other charges on the basis that they have no credible evidence or witnesses, but Bran counters that he saw him betray Ned to Joffrey in a vision. Littlefinger dismisses Bran and furiously demands to be escorted back to the Vale, which Yohn Royce refuses, now knowing the truth about Lysa's death. Realizing that the "trial" is just a show and that he has essentially been betrayed and summoned just to be publicly killed, Littlefinger resorts to begging Sansa for mercy, but she sentences him to death and Arya carries it out.

Sam arrives at Winterfell with his family. Bran tells him that Jon's real parents were Rhaegar Targaryen and Lyanna Stark. Sam reveals information from the High Septon's journal: in secret, Rhaegar's marriage to Elia Martell was annulled and he married Lyanna. Bran revisits the vision of Ned and Lyanna at the Tower of Joy and discovers that Jon's real name is Aegon Targaryen, making him Rhaegar's legitimate lawful son and the rightful Targaryen heir to the Iron Throne, ahead of Daenerys.

=== In the Narrow Sea ===
Tyrion witnesses Jon Snow entering Daenerys' cabin. Jon and Daenerys have sex.

=== At Eastwatch-by-the-Sea ===
The undead army arrives at Eastwatch. When Viserion appears, ridden by the Night King and breathing blue fire, Tormund orders the Night's Watch to evacuate. Viserion destroys Eastwatch and breaches the Wall, finally allowing the White Walkers and the wights to invade the Seven Kingdoms.

== Production ==
=== Writing ===
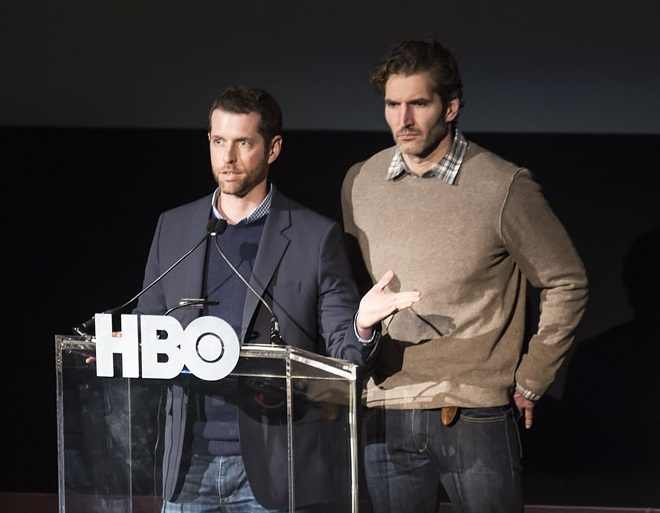
The episode was written by series co-creators David Benioff and D. B. Weiss.

"The Dragon and the Wolf" was written by the series' co-creators David Benioff and D. B. Weiss. In the "Inside the Episode" featurette published by HBO following the airing of the episode, they described the meeting at the dragon pit as one of the most challenging scenes in the episode to write, as they felt it was important to give each character their due. Weiss described the many different interactions between various characters as "deceptively difficult", and the necessity for the actors to be "playing off the person they're supposed to be playing off of" for the scene to be properly translated during the filming process.

For the culmination of the Winterfell storyline, and the death of Littlefinger, Benioff and Weiss stressed the importance of the scenes leading up to the finale, which they described as a realistic threat of harm between Arya and Sansa, with Benioff saying "It's one of the benefits of working on a show like this, where over the years so many beloved characters have been killed, and so many characters make decisions you wish they hadn't that you can believe Sansa might conspire against Arya, or that Arya might decide that Sansa has betrayed the family and deserves to die." Benioff continued by revealing his excitement in seeing Aiden Gillan's performance as Littlefinger, as it was the first time that they had written a scene in which the character was caught unaware, saying "He's imagined every conceivable eventuality except this one." Isaac Hempstead Wright, who portrays Bran, described a scene that was originally written between his character and Sansa, but it was later removed from the episode.

Another challenge involved with writing the episode involved the presentation of the information regarding Jon Snow's lineage, as it mostly consisted of details that had already been revealed in prior scenes. As such, the inclusion of a montage, of Rhaegar and Lyanna, and Jon and Daenerys, was one of the techniques that Benioff and Weiss used to resolve this problem. Weiss noted that it was important to make it clear "that this was almost like an information bomb that Jon was heading towards." Benioff continued by describing Jon and Daenery's intimacy as a complication "on a political level," and "on a personal level," due to the two being related, with Weiss adding "Just as we're seeing these two people come together we’re hearing the information that will inevitably, if not tear them apart at least cause real problems in their relationship." In writing the final interaction between Jaime and Cersei, Benioff felt it was important to convey Cersei's reluctance to fully confide in Jaime.

Leading up to the seventh-season finale, Benioff and Weiss revealed that it was always planned for the penultimate season to end with the destruction of the Wall, and the White Walker army crossing into the Seven Kingdoms. Weiss noted, "The wall's kept these things out for eight thousand years and there's no real reason it can't keep doing that unless something puts a hole in the Wall. There's one thing on the board from the beginning that is now big enough to do that and that's a dragon." They also felt it was essential for the seventh-season finale to contrast well with previous season finale episodes, particularly the sixth-season finale, "The Winds of Winter", which Benioff stated had a more "triumphant ending" as opposed to something "much more horrific" with the conclusion of "The Dragon and the Wolf".

=== Filming ===
"The Dragon and the Wolf" was directed by Jeremy Podeswa. He joined the series as a director in the fifth season, his first episode being "Kill the Boy", which was followed by "Unbowed, Unbent, Unbroken", for which he was nominated for an Emmy Award for Outstanding Directing for a Drama Series. He further directed two more episodes in the series' sixth season, and also directed the seventh season's premiere episode, "Dragonstone". This would be Podeswa's final episode as a director for the series, as he would later reveal that he would not be returning for the series' final season.

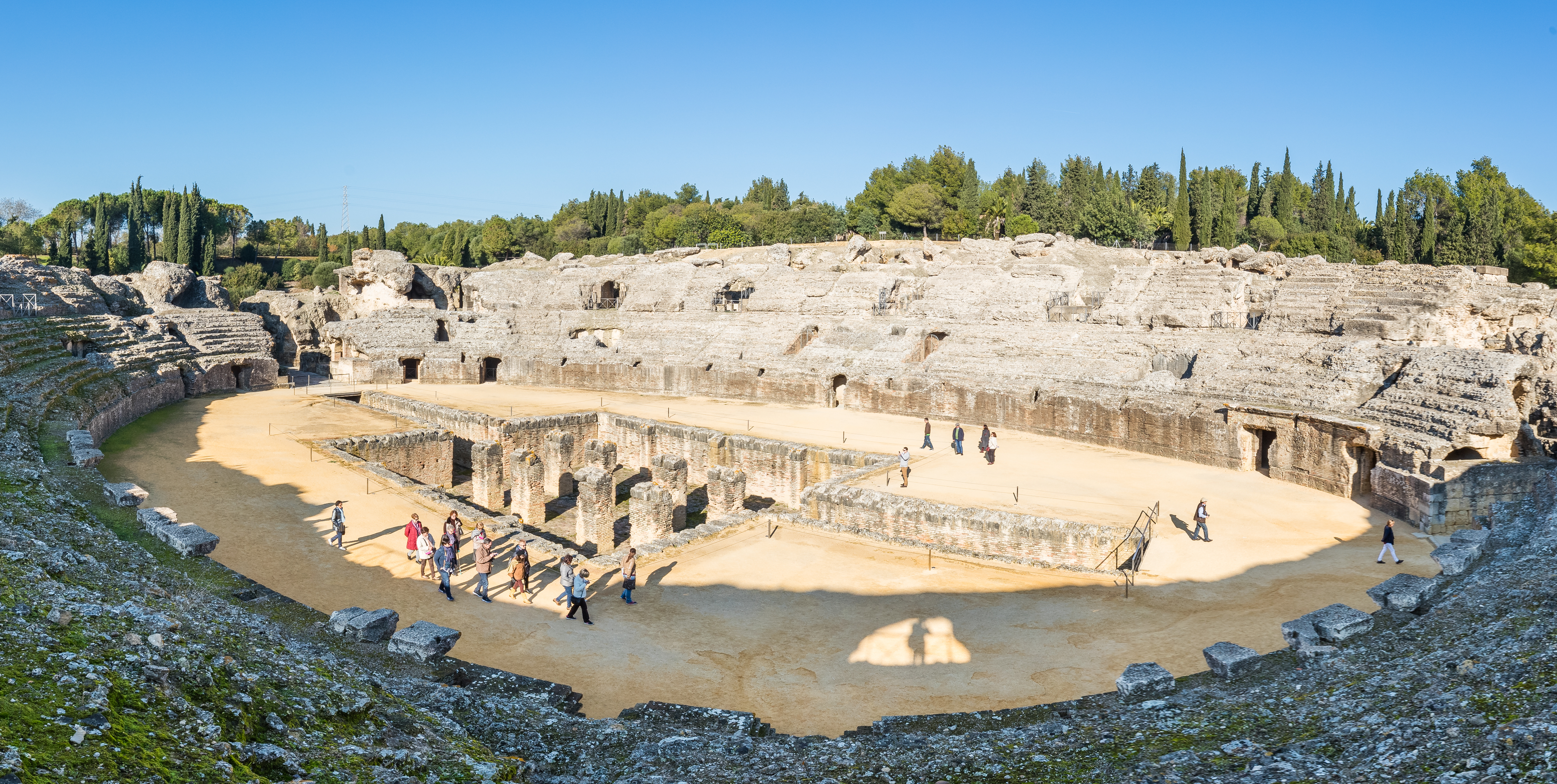
The Roman amphitheatre at Italica stood in as the dragon pit in King's Landing.

In an interview with Variety, Podeswa described the tone in filming the scene at the dragon pit as "laden with tension," and that he was very excited to film the sequence due to several characters meeting for the first time and others reuniting after a long absence from each other. According to a separate interview with USA Today, shooting of the dragon pit scene took place over the course of six days, and was first rehearsed in Belfast, and later on set in Spain. The Italica ruins near Seville, Spain stood in for the dragon pit. Podeswa revealed that the sequence was "40 to 50 pages" in the script, which he felt was a lot of material to work with, saying he had to "make sure everything landed," and that "every look in that script and every moment that needed to be there was actually going to end up on screen."

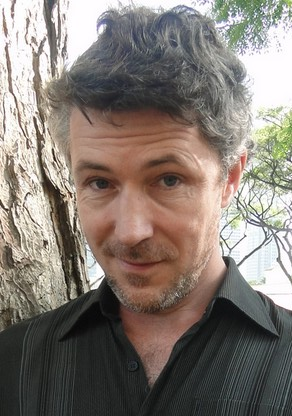
"The Dragon and the Wolf" marks Aidan Gillen's final appearance as Petyr "Littlefinger" Baelish.

In an interview with The Hollywood Reporter, Podeswa described filming the death of Littlefinger and Aidan Gillen's performance, saying "It was moving and difficult to see somebody get to the end of their role on the show, but it was an amazing scene to go out on. The mood when we were shooting it was incredible, actually. Aidan's performance was so, so passionate, and so surprising in a way." The filming of the scene took place over the course of an entire day, with the conclusion being filmed later, with Podeswa noting, "We didn't really shoot the end until a certain point, and [Gillen] was very ready at that point."

Podeswa also described the process behind filming the sexual intimacy between Jon and Daenerys, saying, "In the script, it described the fact that they were love-making, but it didn't go into great detail in terms of what was going on between them as characters in that moment." He went on to state that he "built in a moment between" Kit Harington and Emilia Clarke, who portray Jon and Daenerys respectively, where they "stop for a moment and look into each other's eyes." He continued, "The intention from my point of view, and their point of view too, is that they're driven by passion into this. They don't even fully understand what it's all about and what the consequences of it are. They really can't stop themselves. It's almost destiny that's bringing them together." In regards to the similarity between the appearance of Rhaegar and Viserys Targaryen, Podeswa stated that the brothers were meant to look similar.

Podeswa's first reaction to the final scene of the episode, with the destruction of a portion of the Wall, was "This is an enormous, spectacular sequence. How are we actually going to pull it off?" In order to piece together the sequence, Podeswa was required to work with several different departments, including Benioff and Weiss, the visual effects department, storyboard artist, the set designers, stuntmen, the cinematographer, and the actors themselves. All of the scenes that were filmed on top of the Wall, with Kristofer Hivju and Richard Dormer as Tormund and Beric respectively, were on an actual set in Belfast, along with filming of the stuntmen falling, which would be later transposed by visual effects. He continued by describing the process of creating the non-practical shots by saying, "All of the more panoramic spectacular shots are visual effects, but they're designed by me working with the visual effects department from storyboards that I created with storyboard artists." There were also several interactive elements involved, which Podeswa noted by saying, "When we were shooting the Wall set, we had the lighting effect on the Wall that was caused by the flame, but we hadn't created the flame yet." He continued by revealing the process that went into Viserion's appearance, saying "Everything comes from a sense of logic, so I guess in this particular instance with Viserion, what were the wounds that he suffered before he died? What happened to him underwater and when he was dragged up? All of those kinds of things folded into the discussion of what he should appear to look like when he's resurrected."

== Reception ==
=== Ratings ===
"The Dragon and the Wolf" was viewed by 12.07 million viewers on its initial live broadcast on HBO, and an additional 4.4 million viewers on streaming platforms, for a total 16.5 million viewers. This set a ratings record for Game of Thrones as the highest-rated episode of the series at the time, surpassing "Eastwatch", which previously held the record. The episode also acquired a 5.7 rating in the 18–49 demographic, making it the highest-rated show on cable television of the night. In the United Kingdom, the episode was viewed by 3.54 million viewers on Sky Atlantic, making it the highest-rated broadcast that week on its channel. It also received 1.02 million timeshift viewers.

=== Critical reception ===
"The Dragon and the Wolf" was praised by critics, who listed the meeting at the Dragonpit, Cersei's lack of cooperation to defeat the White Walkers, Aidan Gillen's performance as Littlefinger, and the demolition of the Wall as highlights of the episode. The episode has received an 88% rating on the review aggregator website Rotten Tomatoes from 64 reviews, with an average score of 8.93 out of 10. The site's consensus reads: "While much slower in pace than the season that preceded it, 'The Dragon and the Wolf' delivered satisfying conclusions to several story arcs, and masterfully set up the series' final season."

The pacing of the episode received mixed reviews. On the other hand, Erik Kain of Forbes believed the episode to be too rushed, but praised it nonetheless for being one of the most "ultimately satisfying episodes HBO has given us to date." He listed the reveal of Jon Snow's lineage as one of the most important moments of the episode, and praised it for paralleling Jon and Daenerys's intimate sexual encounter.

Myles McNutt of The A.V Club wrote that the episode returned to the slow pace of the premiere and criticized its pacing and some of the characters motivations, but gave it a B+ overall. Jeremy Egner of The New York Times also gave praise to the episode, albeit with some criticism towards the episode's predictability, stating that while there were "Plenty of enjoyable moments and blue fire-fueled spectacle, and effectively set up next season’s culminating clashes, it didn't offer much in the way of surprise." Matt Fowler of IGN praised the episode's ability at "delivering lengthy meaningful scenes filled with dialogue, deception, revelations, twists", and the assembly at the Dragonpit. He gave the episode a 9.3 out of 10.

Kain and McNutt were also critical that Rhaegar Targaryen bore too great a resemblance to his brother Viserys Targaryen.

=== Accolades ===
Year	Award	Category	Nominee(s)	Result	Ref.
2017	Humanitas Prize	60 Minute Network or Syndicated Television	David Benioff, D. B. Weiss	Nominated	
2018	Directors Guild of America Awards	Dramatic Series	Jeremy Podeswa	Nominated	
2018	Visual Effects Society Awards	Outstanding Effects Simulations in an Episode, Commercial, or Real-Time Project	Thomas Hullin, Dominik Kirouac, Sylvain Nouveau, Nathan Arbuckle – "Wall Destruction"	Won	
2018	Primetime Emmy Awards	Outstanding Supporting Actor in a Drama Series	Peter Dinklage as Tyrion Lannister	Won	
2018	Primetime Emmy Awards	Outstanding Supporting Actress in a Drama Series	Lena Headey as Cersei Lannister	Nominated	
2018	Primetime Emmy Awards	Outstanding Directing for a Drama Series	Jeremy Podeswa	Nominated	
2018	Primetime Emmy Awards	Outstanding Writing for a Drama Series	David Benioff and D. B. Weiss	Nominated	
2018	Primetime Creative Arts Emmy Awards	Outstanding Hairstyling for a Single-Camera Series	Kevin Alexander, Candice Banks, Nicola Mount, Rosalia Culora	Nominated	
2018	Primetime Creative Arts Emmy Awards	Outstanding Makeup for a Single-Camera Series (Non-Prosthetic)	Jane Walker, Kay Bilk, Marianna Kyriacou, Pamela Smyth, Kate Thompson, Nicola Mathews	Nominated	
2018	Primetime Creative Arts Emmy Awards	Outstanding Music Composition for a Series (Original Dramatic Score)	Ramin Djawadi	Won	
2018	Primetime Creative Arts Emmy Awards	Outstanding Single-Camera Picture Editing for a Drama Series	Katie Weiland	Nominated	
