= David Roche Talks to You About Love =

Canadian short film directed by Jeremy Podeswa

- Directed by: Jeremy Podeswa
- Written by: David Roche
- Produced by: Jeremy Podeswa
- Starring: David Roche
- Edited by: Jeremy Podeswa
- Release date: 1983
- Running time: 22 min.
- Country: Canada
- Language: English

David Roche Talks to You About Love is a Canadian short drama film, directed by Jeremy Podeswa and released in 1983. It is a filmed version of performance artist David Roche's theatrical monologue of the same name, featuring Roche's observations on his successes and failures in his romantic and sexual relationships with men.

Made as a student project while Podeswa was studying film at Ryerson Polytechnic, the film premiered at the 1983 Festival of Festivals. It was entered into the Canadian Student Film Festival in 1984, where it won the Norman Jewison Award for best film in the festival program. In 1985, it won the Audience Award for Best Short Film at the Frameline Film Festival.

In 2022, the film was included in the short films program at Outfest.
