= 70th Directors Guild of America Awards =

- Date: February 3, 2018
- Location: The Beverly Hilton, Beverly Hills, California
- Country: United States
- Presented by: Directors Guild of America
- Hosted by: Judd Apatow

Highlights
- Best Director Feature Film: The Shape of Water – Guillermo del Toro
- Best Director Documentary: City of Ghosts – Matthew Heineman
- Best Director First-Time Feature Film: Get Out – Jordan Peele
- Website: https://www.dga.org/Awards/History/2010s/2017.aspx?value=2017

The 70th Directors Guild of America Awards, honoring the outstanding directorial achievement in feature films, documentary, television and commercials of 2017, were presented on February 3, 2018, at Beverly Hilton, Beverly Hills, California. The nominations for the television and documentary categories were announced on January 10, 2018, while the nominations for the film categories were announced on January 11, 2018.

Comedian Judd Apatow hosted the ceremony, and Don Mischer served as the DGA Awards Chair.

== Winners and nominees ==
=== Film ===
Feature Film

Guillermo del Toro – The Shape of Water

- Greta Gerwig – Lady Bird
- Martin McDonagh – Three Billboards Outside Ebbing, Missouri
- Christopher Nolan – Dunkirk
- Jordan Peele – Get Out
Documentaries

Matthew Heineman – City of Ghosts

- Ken Burns and Lynn Novick – The Vietnam War
- Bryan Fogel – Icarus
- Steve James – Abacus: Small Enough to Jail
- Errol Morris – Wormwood
First-Time Feature Film

Jordan Peele – Get Out

- Geremy Jasper – Patti Cake$
- William Oldroyd – Lady Macbeth
- Taylor Sheridan – Wind River
- Aaron Sorkin – Molly's Game

=== Television ===
Drama Series

Reed Morano – The Handmaid's Tale for "Offred"

- The Duffer Brothers – Stranger Things for "Chapter Nine: The Gate"
- Jeremy Podeswa – Game of Thrones for "The Dragon and the Wolf"
- Matt Shakman – Game of Thrones for "The Spoils of War"
- Alan Taylor – Game of Thrones for "Beyond the Wall"
Comedy Series

Beth McCarthy-Miller – Veep for "Chicklet"

- Aziz Ansari – Master of None for "The Thief"
- Mike Judge – Silicon Valley for "Server Error"
- Melina Matsoukas – Master of None for "Thanksgiving"
- Amy Sherman-Palladino – The Marvelous Mrs. Maisel for "Pilot"
Miniseries or TV Film

Jean-Marc Vallée – Big Little Lies

- Scott Frank – Godless
- Barry Levinson – The Wizard of Lies
- Kyra Sedgwick – Story of a Girl
- George C. Wolfe – The Immortal Life of Henrietta Lacks
Variety/Talk/News/Sports – Regularly Scheduled Programming

Don Roy King – Saturday Night Live for "Host: Jimmy Fallon"

- Andre Allen – Full Frontal with Samantha Bee for "#2061"
- Paul G. Casey – Real Time with Bill Maher for "#1527"
- Jim Hoskinson – The Late Show with Stephen Colbert for "Joe Biden/Elton John"
- Paul Pennolino – Last Week Tonight with John Oliver for "French Elections"
Variety/Talk/News/Sports – Specials

Glenn Weiss – The 89th Annual Academy Awards

- Stan Lathan – Dave Chappelle: The Age of Spin
- Linda Mendoza – Kennedy Center Mark Twain Prize Honoring David Letterman
- Paul Pennolino – Full Frontal with Samantha Bee Presents Not the White House Correspondents' Dinner
- Amy Schumer – Amy Schumer: The Leather Special
Reality Programs

Brian Smith – MasterChef for "Vegas Deluxe & Oyster Schucks"

- Hisham Abed – Encore! for "Pilot"
- John Gonzalez – Live PD for "Episode 50"
- Adam Vetri – Dare to Live for "Chainsmokers"
- Kent Weed – Spartan: Ultimate Team Challenge for "Season Premiere"
Children's Programs

Niki Caro – Anne with an E for "Your Will Shall Decide Your Destiny"

- Benjamin Lehmann – The Magical Wand Chase: A Sesame Street Special
- Lily Mariye – Just Add Magic for "Just Add Meddling"
- Alison McDonald – An American Girl Story: Summer Camp, Friends for Life
- Matthew O'Neill and Thalia Sodi – 15: A Quinceañera Story: Zoey

=== Commercials ===
Commercials

Martin de Thurah – StubHub's "Festival" and "Machines", and Wealthsimple's "Mad World"

- Alma Har'el – P&G's "Love without Bias"
- Will Hoffman and Julius Metoyer – KitchenAid's "Anthem" and Ford's "Go Further"
- Miles Jay – Bose's "Alive", and Squarespace's "Calling JohnMalkovich.com" and "Who is JohnMalkovich.com?"
- Isaiah Seret – Samsung's "Growing Up" and "I Love You", and Kohler's "Never Too Composed"

=== Frank Capra Achievement Award ===
- Dwight Williams

=== Franklin J. Schaffner Achievement Award ===
- Jim Tanker

=== Honorary Life Member ===
- Michael Apted

== See also ==
- Producers Guild of America Awards
- Writers Guild of America Awards
