= Jeremy Podeswa =

Canadian film and television director

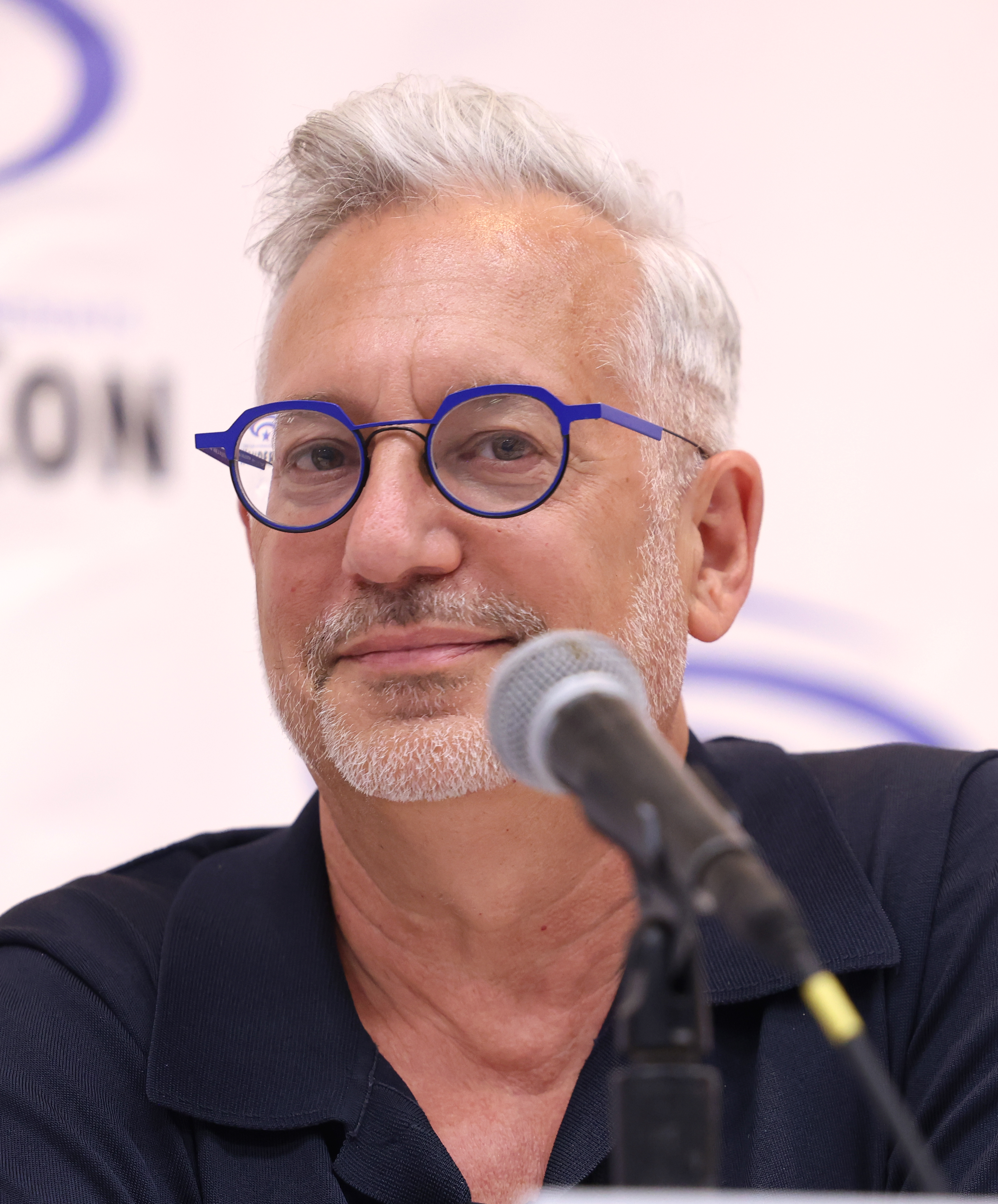
- Podeswa in 2026
- Born: 1962 (age 63–64); Toronto, Ontario, Canada
- Education: Toronto Metropolitan University; AFI Conservatory
- Occupations: Film director, screenwriter
- Years active: 1984–present

Jeremy Podeswa (born 1962) is a Canadian film and television director. He is best known for directing the films The Five Senses (1999) and Fugitive Pieces (2007). He has also worked as director on the television shows Six Feet Under, Nip/Tuck, The Tudors, Queer as Folk, and the HBO World War II miniseries The Pacific. He has also written several films.

In 2014, he directed episodes five and six of the fifth season of the HBO series Game of Thrones, earning a Primetime Emmy Award nomination for Outstanding Directing for a Drama Series for the latter episode. He returned the next season, directing the season premiere and the second episode. He also directed the season premiere as well as the season finale of the seventh season. In 2021, he directed episodes of the TV series adaptation of The Mosquito Coast and the miniseries Station Eleven.

== Biography ==
Jeremy Podeswa was born in 1962 in Toronto, Ontario. He is Jewish, and his Polish Jewish father, a painter, was the only one of his immediate family to make it out of the German Nazi camps alive. He attended the Community Hebrew Academy of Toronto before graduating from Ryerson University's Film Studies program and the American Film Institute's Center for Advanced Film Studies (now the AFI Conservatory). He has recently identified as queer and states that it is only one part of his identity:

...my sexual orientation is one element among others. I believe that the experience of belonging to a minority, whether tied to sexual orientation, religion or race, changes your perspective you can have on of our environment and things in life. My orientation is only one part of me: I am Jewish, my parents are immigrants, I am North American. All these things and many others make what I am. It would be very restrictive, even a mistake, to say that my work or any other filmmaker’s can be reduced to the dimension of sexual orientation.

He was part of a loosely affiliated group of filmmakers to emerge in the 1980s from Toronto known as the Toronto New Wave.

In 1983, 21-year-old Podeswa used his student loans to make his first short film, titled David Roche Talks to You About Love —a 22-minute performance about a gay actor and his views on love. The aspiring director then took jobs as a production assistant, assistant editor and a publicist before he started directing his own films. During the eighties and nineties when he just started his career, he made Canadian indie shorts and features such as The Five Senses, Eclipse, and Fugitive Pieces (2008), loosely based on a novel by Anne Michael, which was awarded the opening night slot at the 2007 International Film Festival. The film has since received critical acclaim. Podeswa has recently made a name for himself directing critically acclaimed and commercially successful television shows, such as Boardwalk Empire, Six Feet Under, True Blood, Dexter, Game of Thrones and Queer as Folk.

== Awards ==
Altogether, Jeremy Podeswa has won 20 awards while having 34 nominations for his expert works. Podeswa was given two Genie Awards in 2000 as Best Director of The Five Senses, which was awarded Best Picture.

In addition, he won an award at NewFest: New York's LGBT Film Festival for the Best Short. Podeswa won an award at the Newport Beach Film Festival in 2008 for Best Film, Best Director, and Best Screenplay. In addition he won Best Short at the San Francisco International Lesbian & Gay Film Festival. His most recent accomplishments occurred in 2015 and 2018, where he was nominated for a Primetime Emmy Award for Outstanding Direction of a Drama Series with Game of Thrones.

== Filmography ==
=== Television ===
Year	Title	Notes
2001–2004	Queer as Folk	4 episodes
2001–2005	Six Feet Under	5 episodes
2002	The Chris Isaak Show	Episode: "Just Us Kids"
2003–2005	Carnivàle	4 episodes
2003	Nip/Tuck	2 episodes
2004	The L Word	Episode: "Lagrimas de Oro"
2004	Wonderfalls	Episode: "Totem Mole"
2005	Rome	Episode: "Utica"
2005	Into the West	Episode: "Ghost Dance"
2005	Commander in Chief	Episode: "Rubie Dubidoux and the Brown Bound Express"
2007	Dexter	Episode: "That Night, A Forest Grew"
2007	John from Cincinnati	Episode: "His Visit: Day Six"
2007	The Riches	Episode: "This Is Your Brain on Drugs"
2007–2010	The Tudors	8 episodes
2009	Empire State	TV short
2009	Weeds	Episode: "Where the Sidewalk Ends"
2010	The Pacific	3 episodes (co-directed 1 episode)
2010	Rubicon	2 episodes
2010–2014	Boardwalk Empire	7 episodes Nominated - Primetime Emmy Award for Outstanding Directing for a Drama Series
2011	Camelot	2 episodes
2011	The Borgias	3 episodes
2011	True Blood	Episode: "I Wish I Was the Moon"
2012	Homeland	Episode: "In Memoriam"
2012–2013	American Horror Story: Asylum	1 episode
2012–2013	The Newsroom	2 episodes
2013	The Walking Dead	Episode: "Dead Weight"
2013	Ray Donovan	Episode: "Road Trip"
2014	American Horror Story: Coven	1 episode
2015–2017	Game of Thrones	6 episodes Nominated - Primetime Emmy Award for Outstanding Directing for a Drama Series; Nominated - Directors Guild of America Award for Outstanding Directing – Drama Series
2015	True Detective	Episode: "Down Will Come"
2018	Here and Now	3 episodes
2018	The Handmaid's Tale	2 episodes
2019	The Loudest Voice	Miniseries; 2 episodes
2019	On Becoming a God in Central Florida	Episode: "The Gloomy-Zombies"
2021	The Mosquito Coast	Episode: "Everybody Knows This Is Nowhere"
2021	Station Eleven	3 episodes, also executive producer
2024	3 Body Problem	2 episodes
2024	The New Look	2 episodes

=== Films ===
Year	Title	Notes
1983	David Roche Talks to You About Love	
1985	In the Name of Bobby	
1986	Nion in the Kabaret de La Vita	Nominated - Genie Award for Best Live Action Short Drama
1992	Standards	
1993	Walls	
1993	Caveman Rainbow	
1994	Eclipse	
1999	The Five Senses	Won – Genie Award for Best Achievement in Direction; Nominated – Genie Award for Best Motion Picture
2000	24fps	
2001	Touch	
2007	Fugitive Pieces	
