= Directors Guild of America Award for Outstanding Directorial Achievement in Dramatic Series =

Annual award for television directing

- Awarded for: Outstanding Directorial Achievement in Dramatic Series
- Country: United States
- Presented by: Directors Guild of America
- First award: 1971
- Currently held by: Amanda Marsalis for The Pitt (2025)
- Website: www.dga.org

The Directors Guild of America Award for Outstanding Directorial Achievement in Dramatic Series is one of the annual Directors Guild of America Awards given by the Directors Guild of America. It was first presented at the 24th Directors Guild of America Awards in 1972. The current eligibility period is the calendar year.

== Winners and nominees ==
=== 1970s ===
Year	Program	Episode	Winners and nominees	Network	Ref.
1971 (24th)	The Man and the City	"Hands of Love"	Daniel Petrie	ABC	
1971 (24th)	Birdbath	–	Lamont Johnson	PBS	
1971 (24th)	Samuel Beckett's Beginning to End	–	Lewis Freedman	PBS	
1972 (25th)	The Waltons	"Dust Bowl Cousins"	Robert Butler	CBS	
1972 (25th)	Hawaii Five-O	"V for Fashion"	Charles S. Dubin	CBS	
1972 (25th)	Marcus Welby, M.D.	"Love is When They Say They Need You"	Marc Daniels	ABC	
1973 (26th)	Kojak	"Knockover"	Charles S. Dubin	CBS	
1973 (26th)	Kung Fu	"Eye for an Eye"	Jerry Thorpe	ABC	
1973 (26th)	The Waltons	"The Journey"	Harry Harris	CBS	
1974 (27th)	Kojak	"Cross Your Heart, Hope to Die"	David Friedkin	CBS	
1974 (27th)	The Streets of San Francisco	"Cry Help"	Corey Allen	ABC	
1974 (27th)	The Streets of San Francisco	"Mask of Death"	Harry Falk	ABC	
1975 (28th)	Jennie: Lady Randolph Churchill		James Cellan Jones	PBS	
1975 (28th)	Carl Sandburg's Lincoln		George Schaefer	NBC	
1975 (28th)	Kojak	"How Cruel The Frost, How Bright The Stars"	David Friedkin	CBS	
1976 (29th)	Family	"Rites of Friendship"	Glenn Jordan	ABC	
1976 (29th)	The Adams Chronicles	"Chapter III: John Adams, Diplomat"	James Cellan Jones	PBS	
1976 (29th)	Rich Man, Poor Man Book II	"Chapter III"	Bill Bixby	ABC	
1977 (30th)	Roots	"Part II"	John Erman	ABC	
1977 (30th)	Family	"Acts of Love: Part 1" & "Acts of Love: Part 2"	E. W. Swackhamer	ABC	
1977 (30th)	James at 15	"Friends"	Joseph Hardy	NBC	
1978 (31st)	Lou Grant	"Prisoner"	Gene Reynolds	CBS	
1978 (31st)	Laurence Olivier Presents	"The Collection"	Michael Apted	PBS	
1978 (31st)	The Paper Chase	"Pilot"	Joseph Hardy	CBS	
1979 (32nd)	Lou Grant	"Cop"	Roger Young	CBS	
1979 (32nd)	Lou Grant	"Bomb"	Gene Reynolds	CBS	
1979 (32nd)	The White Shadow	"Pregnant Pause"	Jackie Cooper	CBS	

=== 1980s ===
Year	Program	Episode	Winners and nominees	Network	Ref.
1980 (33rd)	Lou Grant	"Lou"	Roger Young	CBS	
1980 (33rd)	Dallas	"House Divided"	Irving Moore	CBS	
1980 (33rd)	Lou Grant	"Nightside"	Gene Reynolds	CBS	
1981 (34th)	Hill Street Blues	"Hill Street Station"	Robert Butler	NBC	
1981 (34th)	Hill Street Blues	"The Last White Man on East Ferry"	David Anspaugh	NBC	
1981 (34th)	Hill Street Blues	"Up in Arms"	Georg Stanford Brown	NBC	
1982 (35th)	Hill Street Blues	"Personal Foul"	David Anspaugh	NBC	
1982 (35th)	American Playhouse	"Weekend"	Paul Bogart	PBS	
1982 (35th)	Fame	"And the Winner Is"	Marc Daniels	NBC	
1983 (36th)	Hill Street Blues	"Life in the Minors"	Jeff Bleckner	NBC	
1983 (36th)	Hill Street Blues	"Goodbye, Mr. Scripps"	Corey Allen	NBC	
1983 (36th)	Hill Street Blues	"Here's Adventure, Here's Romance"	Christian Nyby	NBC	
1984 (37th)	Hill Street Blues	"The Rise and Fall of Paul the Wall"	Thomas Carter	NBC	
1984 (37th)	St. Elsewhere	"Fade to White"	David Anspaugh	NBC	
1984 (37th)	St. Elsewhere	"Sweet Dreams"	Mark Tinker	NBC	
1985 (38th)	Moonlighting	"My Fair David"	Will Mackenzie	ABC	
1985 (38th)	Cagney & Lacey	"Who Said it's Fair? (Part 2)"	Ray Danton	CBS	
1985 (38th)	Miami Vice	"Smuggler's Blues"	Paul Michael Glaser	NBC	
1986 (39th)	Moonlighting	"Atomic Shakespeare"	Will Mackenzie	ABC	
1986 (39th)	L.A. Law	"The Venus Butterfly"	Donald Petrie	NBC	
1986 (39th)	St. Elsewhere	"Afterlife"	Mark Tinker	NBC	
1987 (40th)	thirtysomething	"Pilot"	Marshall Herskovitz	ABC	
1987 (40th)	Cagney & Lacey	"Turn, Turn, Turn (Part 1)"	Sharron Miller	CBS	
1987 (40th)	St. Elsewhere	"Weigh In, Weigh Out"	Mark Tinker	NBC	
1988 (41st)	thirtysomething	"Therapy"	Marshall Herskovitz	ABC	
1988 (41st)	St. Elsewhere	"The Last One"	Mark Tinker	NBC	
1988 (41st)	thirtysomething	"Accounts Receivable, Michael's Brother"	Edward Zwick	ABC	
1989 (42nd)	L.A. Law	"I'm in the Nude for Love"	Eric Laneuville	NBC	
1989 (42nd)	L.A. Law	"Lie Down and Deliver"	Gabrielle Beaumont	NBC	
1989 (42nd)	L.A. Law	"To Live and Diet in L.A."	John Pasquin	NBC	
1989 (42nd)	thirtysomething	"Love & Sex"	Marshall Herskovitz	ABC	

=== 1990s ===
Year	Program	Episode	Winners and nominees	Network	Ref.
1990 (43rd)	Quantum Leap	"The Leap Home (Part 2)"	Michael Zinberg	NBC	
1990 (43rd)	thirtysomething	"The Go-Between"	Scott Winant	ABC	
1990 (43rd)	Twin Peaks	"Episode 5"	Lesli Linka Glatter	ABC	
1991 (44th)	I'll Fly Away	"All God's Children"	Eric Laneuville	NBC	
1991 (44th)	Northern Exposure	"Goodbye to All That"	Stuart Margolin	CBS	
1991 (44th)	Northern Exposure	"Jules & Joel"	James Hayman	CBS	
1992 (45th)	Northern Exposure	"Cicely"	Rob Thompson	CBS	
1992 (45th)	I'll Fly Away	"The Way Things Are"	Roy Campanella II	NBC	
1992 (45th)	Northern Exposure	"Thanksgiving"	Michael Fresco	CBS	
1993 (46th)	NYPD Blue	"Pilot"	Gregory Hoblit	ABC	
1993 (46th)	Homicide: Life on the Street	"Gone for Goode"	Barry Levinson	NBC	
1993 (46th)	NYPD Blue	"From Hare to Eternity"	Eric Laneuville	ABC	
1993 (46th)	NYPD Blue	"True Confessions"	Charles Haid	ABC	
1993 (46th)	Picket Fences	"The Dancing Bandit"	Lou Antonio	CBS	
1994 (47th)	ER	"Into That Good Night"	Charles Haid	NBC	
1994 (47th)	Chicago Hope	"Pilot"	Michael Pressman	CBS	
1994 (47th)	ER	"Blizzard"	Mimi Leder	NBC	
1994 (47th)	ER	"The Gift"	Félix Enríquez Alcalá	NBC	
1994 (47th)	NYPD Blue	"Simon Says"	Gregory Hoblit	ABC	
1995 (48th)	ER	"Hell and High Water"	Christopher Chulack	NBC	
1995 (48th)	ER	"Do One, Teach One, Kill One"	Félix Enríquez Alcalá	NBC	
1995 (48th)	ER	"Love's Labor Lost"	Mimi Leder	NBC	
1995 (48th)	Murder One	"Pilot"	Charles Haid	ABC	
1995 (48th)	The X-Files	"The List"	Chris Carter	Fox	
1996 (49th)	ER	"Fear of Flying"	Christopher Chulack	NBC	
1996 (49th)	ER	"Ask Me No Questions, I'll Tell You No Lies"	Paris Barclay	NBC	
1996 (49th)	ER	"The Healers"	Mimi Leder	NBC	
1996 (49th)	NYPD Blue	"A Death in the Family"	Mark Tinker	ABC	
1996 (49th)	NYPD Blue	"These Old Bones"	Donna Deitch	ABC	
1997 (50th)	Homicide: Life on the Street	"The Documentary"	Barbara Kopple	NBC	
1997 (50th)	Ally McBeal	"Pilot"	James Frawley	Fox	
1997 (50th)	Brooklyn South	"Pilot"	Mark Tinker	CBS	
1997 (50th)	ER	"Fathers and Sons"	Christopher Chulack	NBC	
1997 (50th)	The X-Files	"The Post-Modern Prometheus"	Chris Carter	Fox	
1998 (51st)	NYPD Blue	"Hearts and Souls"	Paris Barclay	ABC	
1998 (51st)	Homicide: Life on the Street	"Finnegan's Wake"	Steve Buscemi	NBC	
1998 (51st)	Law & Order	"Under the Influence"	Adam Davidson	NBC	
1998 (51st)	NYPD Blue	"Danny Boy"	Mark Tinker	ABC	
1998 (51st)	The X-Files	"Triangle"	Chris Carter	Fox	
1999 (52nd)	The Sopranos	"Pilot"	David Chase	HBO	
1999 (52nd)	The Sopranos	"46 Long"	Daniel Attias	HBO	
1999 (52nd)	The Sopranos	"College"	Allen Coulter	HBO	
1999 (52nd)	The Sopranos	"Nobody Knows Anything"	Henry J. Bronchtein	HBO	
1999 (52nd)	The West Wing	"Pilot"	Thomas Schlamme	NBC	

=== 2000s ===
Year	Program	Episode	Winners and nominees	Network	Ref.
2000 (53rd)	The West Wing	"Noël"	Thomas Schlamme	NBC	
2000 (53rd)	The Sopranos	"From Where to Eternity"	Henry J. Bronchtein	HBO	
2000 (53rd)	The Sopranos	"Funhouse"	John Patterson	HBO	
2000 (53rd)	The Sopranos	"The Knight in White Satin Armor"	Allen Coulter	HBO	
2000 (53rd)	The West Wing	"The Portland Trip"	Paris Barclay	NBC	
2001 (54th)	Six Feet Under	"Pilot"	Alan Ball	HBO	
2001 (54th)	24	"12:00 a.m. – 1:00 a.m."	Stephen Hopkins	Fox	
2001 (54th)	The Sopranos	"Pine Barrens"	Steve Buscemi	HBO	
2001 (54th)	The West Wing	"The Indians in the Lobby"	Paris Barclay	NBC	
2001 (54th)	The West Wing	"Two Cathedrals"	Thomas Schlamme	NBC	
2002 (55th)	The Sopranos	"Whitecaps"	John Patterson	HBO	
2002 (55th)	Six Feet Under	"Back to the Garden"	Daniel Attias	HBO	
2002 (55th)	The Sopranos	"Whoever Did This"	Tim Van Patten	HBO	
2002 (55th)	The West Wing	"Debate Camp"	Paris Barclay	NBC	
2002 (55th)	The West Wing	"Posse Comitatus"	Alex Graves	NBC	
2003 (56th)	The West Wing	"Twenty Five"	Christopher Misiano	NBC	
2003 (56th)	24	"Day 2: 7:00 a.m. – 8:00 a.m."	Jon Cassar	Fox	
2003 (56th)	Six Feet Under	"I'm Sorry, I'm Lost"	Alan Ball	HBO	
2003 (56th)	Six Feet Under	"Nobody Sleeps"	Alan Poul	HBO	
2003 (56th)	Six Feet Under	"Twilight"	Kathy Bates	HBO	
2004 (57th)	Deadwood	"Deadwood"	Walter Hill	HBO	
2004 (57th)	ER	"Time of Death"	Christopher Chulack	NBC	
2004 (57th)	Lost	"Pilot (Part 1)"	J. J. Abrams	ABC	
2004 (57th)	The Sopranos	"All Due Respect"	John Patterson	HBO	
2004 (57th)	The Sopranos	"Long Term Parking"	Tim Van Patten	HBO	
2005 (58th)	Rome	"The Stolen Eagle"	Michael Apted	HBO	
2005 (58th)	Grey's Anatomy	"A Hard Day's Night"	Peter Horton	ABC	
2005 (58th)	Grey's Anatomy	"Into You Like a Train"	Jeff Melman	ABC	
2005 (58th)	House	"Three Stories"	Paris Barclay	Fox	
2005 (58th)	Six Feet Under	"Everyone's Waiting"	Alan Ball	HBO	
2006 (59th)	24	"Day 5: 7:00 a.m. – 8:00 a.m."	Jon Cassar	Fox	
2006 (59th)	Grey's Anatomy	"It's the End of the World" & "As We Know It"	Peter Horton	ABC	
2006 (59th)	The Sopranos	"Join the Club"	David Nutter	HBO	
2006 (59th)	The Sopranos	"Members Only"	Tim Van Patten	HBO	
2006 (59th)	Studio 60 on the Sunset Strip	"Pilot"	Thomas Schlamme	NBC	
2007 (60th)	Mad Men	"Smoke Gets in Your Eyes"	Alan Taylor	AMC	
2007 (60th)	Lost	"The Brig"	Eric Laneuville	ABC	
2007 (60th)	Lost	"Through the Looking Glass"	Jack Bender	ABC	
2007 (60th)	The Sopranos	"Made in America"	David Chase	HBO	
2007 (60th)	The Sopranos	"Soprano Home Movies"	Tim Van Patten	HBO	
2008 (61st)	The Wire	"Transitions"	Dan Attias	HBO	
2008 (61st)	In Treatment	"Week 8: Alex"	Paris Barclay	HBO	
2008 (61st)	Lost	"The Constant"	Jack Bender	ABC	
2008 (61st)	Mad Men	"Meditations in an Emergency"	Matthew Weiner	AMC	
2008 (61st)	Mad Men	"The Mountain King"	Alan Taylor	AMC	
2009 (62nd)	Mad Men	"Guy Walks Into an Advertising Agency"	Lesli Linka Glatter	AMC	
2009 (62nd)	In Treatment	"Week 4: Gina"	Paris Barclay	HBO	
2009 (62nd)	Lost	"The Incident"	Jack Bender	ABC	
2009 (62nd)	Mad Men	"The Gypsy and the Hobo"	Jennifer Getzinger	AMC	
2009 (62nd)	Mad Men	"Shut the Door. Have a Seat."	Matthew Weiner	AMC	

=== 2010s ===
Year	Program	Episode	Winners and nominees	Network	Ref.
2010 (63rd)	Boardwalk Empire	"Boardwalk Empire"	Martin Scorsese	HBO	
2010 (63rd)	Boardwalk Empire	"Paris Green"	Allen Coulter	HBO	
2010 (63rd)	Lost	"The End"	Jack Bender	ABC	
2010 (63rd)	Mad Men	"The Suitcase"	Jennifer Getzinger	AMC	
2010 (63rd)	The Walking Dead	"Days Gone Bye"	Frank Darabont	AMC	
2011 (64th)	The Killing	"Pilot"	Patty Jenkins	AMC	
2011 (64th)	Breaking Bad	"Face Off"	Vince Gilligan	AMC	
2011 (64th)	Friday Night Lights	"Always"	Michael Waxman	The 101 Network / NBC	
2011 (64th)	Game of Thrones	"Winter Is Coming"	Tim Van Patten	HBO	
2011 (64th)	Homeland	"Pilot"	Michael Cuesta	Showtime	
2012 (65th)	Breaking Bad	"Fifty-One"	Rian Johnson	AMC	
2012 (65th)	Homeland	"The Choice"	Michael Cuesta	Showtime	
2012 (65th)	Homeland	"Q&A"	Lesli Linka Glatter	Showtime	
2012 (65th)	Mad Men	"A Little Kiss"	Jennifer Getzinger	AMC	
2012 (65th)	The Newsroom	"We Just Decided To"	Greg Mottola	HBO	
2013 (66th)	Breaking Bad	"Felina"	Vince Gilligan	AMC	
2013 (66th)	Breaking Bad	"Blood Money"	Bryan Cranston	AMC	
2013 (66th)	Game of Thrones	"The Rains of Castamere"	David Nutter	HBO	
2013 (66th)	Homeland	"The Star"	Lesli Linka Glatter	Showtime	
2013 (66th)	House of Cards	"Chapter 1"	David Fincher	Netflix	
2014 (67th)	Homeland	"From A to B and Back Again"	Lesli Linka Glatter	Showtime	
2014 (67th)	Game of Thrones	"The Children"	Alex Graves	HBO	
2014 (67th)	Homeland	"13 Hours in Islamabad"	Dan Attias	Showtime	
2014 (67th)	House of Cards	"Chapter 22"	Jodie Foster	Netflix	
2014 (67th)	True Detective	"Who Goes There"	Cary Joji Fukunaga	HBO	
2015 (68th)	Game of Thrones	"Mother's Mercy"	David Nutter	HBO	
2015 (68th)	Downton Abbey	"Episode Eight"	Michael Engler	PBS	
2015 (68th)	Homeland	"The Tradition of Hospitality"	Lesli Linka Glatter	Showtime	
2015 (68th)	The Knick	"Williams and Walker"	Steven Soderbergh	Cinemax	
2015 (68th)	Mad Men	"Person to Person"	Matthew Weiner	AMC	
2016 (69th)	Game of Thrones	"Battle of the Bastards"	Miguel Sapochnik	HBO	
2016 (69th)	The People v. O. J. Simpson: American Crime Story	"From the Ashes of Tragedy"	Ryan Murphy	FX	
2016 (69th)	The People v. O. J. Simpson: American Crime Story	"The Race Card"	John Singleton	FX	
2016 (69th)	Stranger Things	"Chapter One: The Vanishing of Will Byers"	The Duffer Brothers	Netflix	
2016 (69th)	Westworld	"The Original"	Jonathan Nolan	HBO	
2017 (70th)	The Handmaid's Tale	"Offred"	Reed Morano	Hulu	
2017 (70th)	Game of Thrones	"Beyond the Wall"	Alan Taylor	HBO	
2017 (70th)	Game of Thrones	"The Dragon and the Wolf"	Jeremy Podeswa	HBO	
2017 (70th)	Game of Thrones	"The Spoils of War"	Matt Shakman	HBO	
2017 (70th)	Stranger Things	"Chapter Nine: The Gate"	The Duffer Brothers	Netflix	
2018 (71st)	Succession	"Celebration"	Adam McKay	HBO	
2018 (71st)	The Americans	"START"	Chris Long	FX	
2018 (71st)	The Handmaid's Tale	"Holly"	Daina Reid	Hulu	
2018 (71st)	Homeland	"Paean to the People"	Lesli Linka Glatter	Showtime	
2018 (71st)	Ozark	"Reparations"	Jason Bateman	Netflix	
2019 (72nd)	Watchmen	"It's Summer and We're Running Out of Ice"	Nicole Kassell	HBO	
2019 (72nd)	Game of Thrones	"The Last of the Starks"	David Nutter	HBO	
2019 (72nd)	Game of Thrones	"The Long Night"	Miguel Sapochnik	HBO	
2019 (72nd)	Succession	"This Is Not for Tears"	Mark Mylod	HBO	
2019 (72nd)	Watchmen	"This Extraordinary Being"	Stephen Williams	HBO	

=== 2020s ===
Year	Program	Episode	Winners and nominees	Network	Ref.
2020 (73rd)	Homeland	"Prisoners of War"	Lesli Linka Glatter	Showtime	
2020 (73rd)	Better Call Saul	"Bagman"	Vince Gilligan	AMC	
2020 (73rd)	Bridgerton	"Diamond of the First Water"	Julie Anne Robinson	Netflix	
2020 (73rd)	The Mandalorian	"Chapter 9: The Marshal"	Jon Favreau	Disney+	
2020 (73rd)	Ozark	"Wartime"	Jason Bateman	Netflix	
2021 (74th)	Succession	"All the Bells Say"	Mark Mylod	HBO	
2021 (74th)	Succession	"Retired Janitors of Idaho"	Kevin Bray	HBO	
2021 (74th)	Succession	"What It Takes"	Andrij Parekh	HBO	
2021 (74th)	Succession	"Lion in the Meadow"	Robert Pulcini and Shari Springer Berman	HBO	
2021 (74th)	Succession	"Too Much Birthday"	Lorene Scafaria	HBO	
2022 (75th)	Euphoria	"Stand Still Like the Hummingbird"	Sam Levinson	HBO	
2022 (75th)	Better Call Saul	"Waterworks"	Vince Gilligan	AMC	
2022 (75th)	Ozark	"A Hard Way To Go"	Jason Bateman	Netflix	
2022 (75th)	Severance	"Hide and Seek"	Aoife McArdle	Apple TV+	
2022 (75th)	Severance	"The We We Are"	Ben Stiller	Apple TV+	
2023 (76th)	The Last of Us	"Long, Long Time"	Peter Hoar	HBO	
2023 (76th)	Succession	"Rehearsal"	Becky Martin	HBO	
2023 (76th)	Succession	"Connor's Wedding"	Mark Mylod	HBO	
2023 (76th)	Succession	"America Decides"	Andrij Parekh	HBO	
2023 (76th)	Succession	"Tailgate Party"	Robert Pulcini and Shari Springer Berman	HBO	
2024 (77th)	Shōgun	"Crimson Sky"	Frederick E. O. Toye	FX	
2024 (77th)	The Diplomat	"Dreadnought"	Alex Graves	Netflix	
2024 (77th)	Shōgun	"Anjin"	Jonathan Van Tulleken	FX	
2024 (77th)	Shōgun	"Ladies of the Willow World"	Hiromi Kamata	FX	
2024 (77th)	True Detective	"Part 6"	Issa López	HBO	
2025 (78th)	The Pitt	"6:00 P.M."	Amanda Marsalis	HBO Max	
2025 (78th)	The Diplomat	"Amagansett"	Liza Johnson	Netflix	
2025 (78th)	Andor	"Who Are You?"	Janus Metz Pedersen	Disney+	
2025 (78th)	Severance	"Cold Harbor"	Ben Stiller	Apple TV	
2025 (78th)	The Pitt	"7:00 A.M."	John Wells	HBO Max	

== Programs with multiple wins ==
4 wins

- Hill Street Blues (NBC)

3 wins

- ER (NBC)
- Lou Grant (CBS)

2 wins

- Breaking Bad (AMC)
- Game of Thrones (HBO)
- Homeland (Showtime)
- Kojak (CBS)
- Mad Men (AMC)
- Moonlighting (ABC)
- NYPD Blue (ABC)
- The Sopranos (HBO)
- Succession (HBO)
- thirtysomething (ABC)
- The West Wing (NBC)

== Programs with multiple nominations ==
16 nominations

- The Sopranos (HBO)

11 nominations

- ER (NBC)
- Succession (HBO)

10 nominations

- Game of Thrones (HBO)

9 nominations

- Homeland (Showtime)
- Mad Men (AMC)

8 nominations

- Hill Street Blues (NBC)
- NYPD Blue (ABC)
- The West Wing (NBC)

6 nominations

- Lost (ABC)
- Six Feet Under (HBO)

5 nominations

- Lou Grant (CBS)
- St. Elsewhere (NBC)
- thirtysomething (ABC)

4 nominations

- Breaking Bad (AMC)
- L.A. Law (NBC)
- Northern Exposure (CBS)

3 nominations

- 24 (Fox)
- Grey's Anatomy (ABC)
- Homicide: Life on the Street (NBC)
- Kojak (CBS)
- Ozark (Netflix)
- Severance (Apple TV+)
- Shōgun (FX)
- The X-Files (Fox)

2 nominations

- American Crime Story (FX)
- Better Call Saul (Netflix)
- Boardwalk Empire (HBO)
- Cagney & Lacey (CBS)
- The Diplomat (Netflix)
- Family (ABC)
- The Handmaid's Tale (Hulu)
- House of Cards (Netflix)
- I'll Fly Away (NBC)
- In Treatment (HBO)
- Moonlighting (ABC)
- The Pitt (HBO Max)
- The Streets of San Francisco (ABC)
- Stranger Things (Netflix)
- True Detective (HBO)
- The Waltons (CBS)
- Watchmen (HBO)

== Individuals with multiple wins ==
3 wins

- Lesli Linka Glatter

2 wins

- Robert Butler (consecutive)
- Christopher Chulack (consecutive)
- Marshall Herskovitz (consecutive)
- Eric Laneuville
- Will Mackenzie (consecutive)
- Roger Young (consecutive)

== Individuals with multiple nominations ==
8 nominations

- Paris Barclay
- Lesli Linka Glatter

7 nominations

- Mark Tinker

5 nominations

- Tim Van Patten

4 nominations

- Dan Attias
- Jack Bender
- Christopher Chulack
- Vince Gilligan
- Eric Laneuville
- David Nutter
- Thomas Schlamme

3 nominations

- David Anspaugh
- Alan Ball
- Jason Bateman
- Chris Carter
- Allen Coulter
- Jennifer Getzinger
- Alex Graves
- Charles Haid
- Marshall Herskovitz
- Mimi Leder
- Mark Mylod
- John Patterson
- Gene Reynolds
- Alan Taylor
- Matthew Weiner

2 nominations

- Félix Enríquez Alcalá
- Corey Allen
- Michael Apted
- Henry J. Bronchtein
- Steve Buscemi
- Robert Butler
- Jon Cassar
- James Cellan Jones
- David Chase
- Michael Cuesta
- Marc Daniels
- Charles S. Dubin
- The Duffer Brothers
- David Friedkin
- Alex Graves
- Joseph Hardy
- Gregory Hoblit
- Peter Horton
- Will Mackenzie
- Andrij Parekh
- Robert Pulcini
- Miguel Sapochnik
- Ben Stiller
- Shari Springer Berman
- Roger Young

== Total awards by network ==
- HBO – 14
- NBC – 13
- ABC – 9
- CBS – 7
- AMC – 5
- Showtime – 2
- Fox – 1
- FX – 1
- Hulu – 1
- PBS – 1
