= Beyond the Wall (Game of Thrones) =

- Game of Thrones episode
- Episode no.: Season 7 Episode 6
- Directed by: Alan Taylor
- Written by: David Benioff; D. B. Weiss
- Cinematography by: Jonathan Freeman
- Editing by: Tim Porter
- Original air date: August 20, 2017
- Running time: 70 minutes

Guest appearances
- Richard Dormer as Beric Dondarrion; Paul Kaye as Thoros of Myr; Joseph Mawle as Benjen Stark; Richard Rycroft as Maester Wolkan; Vladimir Furdik as the Night King

Episode chronology
← Previous "Eastwatch"	Next → "The Dragon and the Wolf"
- Game of Thrones season 7

"Beyond the Wall" is the sixth and penultimate episode of the seventh season of HBO's fantasy television series Game of Thrones, and the 66th overall. It was written by series co-creators David Benioff and D. B. Weiss, and directed by Alan Taylor. The episode was 70 minutes long, making it one of the longest episodes of the series.

The episode's main plot focuses on Jon Snow's raiding party as they journey north of the Wall; they successfully capture a wight to prove the threat, though Thoros is killed. Daenerys rescues the group from the Army of the Dead, and the Night King kills and reanimates Viserion. Jon is separately rescued by Benjen, who sacrifices himself, and Jon acknowledges Daenerys as queen. Meanwhile, at Winterfell, tension builds between Sansa and Arya.

The title of the episode is taken from the namesake lands where most of the episode takes place. "Beyond the Wall" received mostly positive praise from critics, who listed the epic scale and special effects of the battle between the White Walkers and the dragons, the interactions between the northern raiding party, and Jon swearing fealty to Daenerys as highlights of the episode, though some reviewers criticized the episode for "defying logic" and its rushed storytelling. In the United States, the episode achieved a viewership of 10.24 million in its initial broadcast.

This episode marks the final appearances of Joseph Mawle (Benjen Stark) and Paul Kaye (Thoros of Myr).

== Plot ==
=== At Winterfell ===
Arya confronts Sansa about the letter Sansa wrote to persuade Robb to bend the knee to Joffrey. Arya accuses Sansa of mainly being concerned that she will lose face with the Northern lords if the letter is made public. Sansa confides in Littlefinger, who suggests that Brienne, sworn to serve both sisters, would intervene if Arya acted against Sansa. However, when Cersei invites Sansa to King's Landing to parley, Sansa sends Brienne as her representative and she reluctantly goes. Sansa searches Arya's room and finds Arya's faces. Arya discovers Sansa and explains her training with the Faceless Men. Arya says she could take Sansa's face, seemingly threatening her with the Valyrian steel dagger before instead leaving her with it.

=== At Dragonstone ===
Tyrion suspects Cersei will lay a trap when they meet, but counsels Daenerys to not stoop to her level. Daenerys grows frustrated with Tyrion's idealism, but he reassures her of his loyalty to her cause. Tyrion further questions how Daenerys, who believes herself infertile, can establish a legacy that will outlive her. Daenerys replies that she will only discuss succession after she has ascended to the Iron Throne.

=== Beyond the Wall ===
Jon, the Hound, Jorah, Beric, Thoros, and Gendry journey beyond the wall with Tormund and several other Wildlings. Jon offers Longclaw, the ancestral Mormont sword, to Jorah, but Jorah insists Jon keep it.

An undead polar bear attacks the party, and Thoros is savaged saving the Hound. The party continues onwards. Jon and the others ambush and destroy a White Walker accompanied by wights, and all but one of the wights instantly collapse, inanimate. They capture the last wight but not before he signals the undead army to his location by a high-pitched shriek. A horde of wights approaches, and Gendry is sent alone to Eastwatch to send a raven to Daenerys while the others take refuge on a small island in the middle of a partially frozen lake. The Night King and other White Walkers watch from high ground. Beric suggests that destroying the Night King will in turn destroy the other White Walkers and the wights. Thoros succumbs to his wounds and the others cremate him.

Gendry arrives at Eastwatch, and Davos has the raven sent to Daenerys. Daenerys flies her dragons north, having received the raven and having rejected Tyrion's advice to "do nothing".

The wights attack Jon's group when the water refreezes. Daenerys arrives and the dragons burn many wights. The men try to evacuate on Drogon but the wights continue their attack; using an ice javelin, the Night King kills Viserion. Jon stays on the ground to cover the others' departure, but is pulled into the water. Jon is saved by Benjen Stark, who gives Jon his horse to ride to Eastwatch while sacrificing himself to hold off the wights.

Returning to Eastwatch, Jon apologizes to Daenerys for Viserion's death; she tearfully accepts the loss as the cost of her learning the truth, and she vows to fight the Night King with Jon. He calls her "my Queen" and believes the Northern lords will come to accept her leadership.

Beyond the wall, the Night King reanimates Viserion.

== Production ==
=== Writing ===
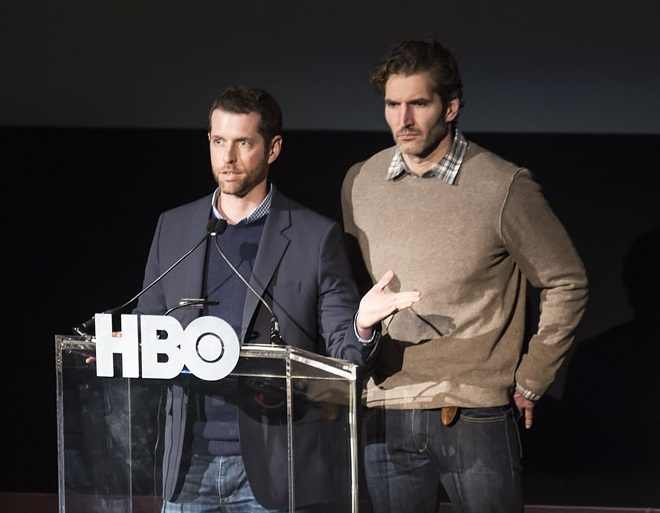
The episode was written by series co-creators David Benioff and D. B. Weiss.

"Beyond the Wall" was written by Game of Thrones creators David Benioff and D. B. Weiss. In the "Inside the Episode" featurette published by HBO following the airing of the episode, David Benioff indicated that the death of the dragon Viserion was something that he and the writers had been working towards for a long time, and added "The whole path of the show in some way has been trying to map out all of the episode end points, and with this one, it was the dragon opening its blue eye, and realizing that the Night King has finally gotten his own weapon of mass destruction." Weiss also stated that the most enjoyable part in writing the sequence was to make it seem as though all of the "good guys" were going to "get out the other side more or less scot-free", and knew that subsequently killing the dragon would have "a tremendous emotional impact", due to its importance to Daenerys. He continued by saying that they knew it would be important for the Night King to seize on the opportunity to kill a dragon, and that they intended for the scene to be a "one-two punch" by having the viewer witness "the horror" involved with seeing "one of these three amazing beings like this in the world going under the water and not coming up again, and processing that", but also "processing something that's even worse", by having the dragon pulled out of the water and becoming a part of the Night King's army.

Regarding the inclusion of the wight polar bear attack, Benioff and Weiss stated that they had wanted to have a wight polar bear for "about four seasons", but never made it onto the screen due to opposition from the special effects team. Weiss recalled being told that they were not able to afford the special effect, but felt that it made "perfect sense that you could have one of these things out there, and we really put our four feet down and said goddamnit, we want a zombie polar bear", and thus wrote it into the episode.

Weiss also spoke about the concluding Winterfell sequence, saying that once Sansa finds Arya's collection of faces and is confronted, Sansa intended to start to see Arya as "a real, physical danger to her", and that they wanted to translate that fear to the subsequent episode, in "The Dragon and the Wolf".

=== Filming ===
"Beyond the Wall" was directed by Alan Taylor. This was Taylor's seventh episode as a director for the series, but it was his first episode since the second season, where he directed that season's finale episode, "Valar Morghulis". He was also a director for two episodes in the first season, "Baelor" and "Fire and Blood", as well as four other episodes in the second season. Since his hiatus from the series, Taylor was a director for several big budget Hollywood films, including Thor: The Dark World and Terminator Genisys. Taylor had fallen into depression following his bad experiences working in both the Marvel Cinematic Universe (MCU) and the Terminator franchise, so he felt that returning to direct this episode of Game of Thrones was part of his "healing process" to rediscover his joy for filmmaking. In an interview with Entertainment Weekly, Taylor spoke about the differences between his earlier stint with the series, and his return for the show's seventh season, saying he was previously told to avoid using green screen, and thus special effects, due to the budgetary constraints that the series had in its earlier seasons. However, with "Beyond the Wall", he was able to fully utilize visual effects to create the large environment, dragons and armies due to the increased budget. He also described the experience as "going full circle", having witnessed the evolution of characters such as Sophie Turner as Sansa and Maisie Williams as Arya Stark, whom he directed when they were children, and that they have since grown up.

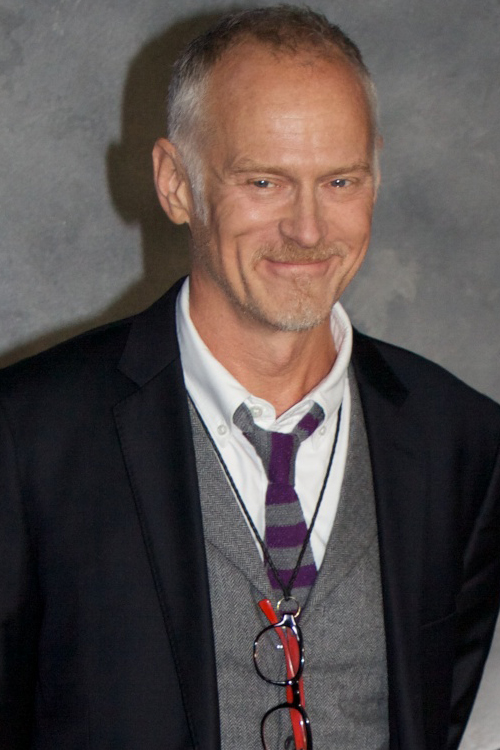
Director Alan Taylor returned to the series after a hiatus, last directing "Valar Morghulis" in the series' second season.

Many of the scenes leading up to the battle with the White Walker army were filmed in Iceland, but the majority of the episode's battle sequence was filmed in a quarry in Belfast, Northern Ireland. Taylor had expected to film the sequence entirely in Iceland, but quickly realized that it was not feasible due to the amount of production that was required. In filming the wight polar bear attack, Taylor noted that the bear was designed by the New Zealand-based Weta Digital, which previously worked on The Lord of the Rings trilogy. Richard Dormer, who portrays Beric Dondarrion, described filming the scene in a separate interview, saying "It was very cold, wet and physical. Hot as well, running around imagining a 12-foot flaming polar bear. It's pretty weird, but it was fun." Dormer also noted the difficulty of filming a flaming sword, revealing that the sword could only burn for two minutes at a time, and could not be swung too quickly, requiring Dormer to slow down his movement. He also said that the sword he was using weighed approximately three times more than a normal sword. Though the actors were dressed warmly for the scenes beyond the Wall, their suits contained a "tube system through which cold water can be circulated between shots using a portable pump to keep them from getting overheated", due to the actual warmth of filming on a fake set in Northern Ireland. This was also essential due to the possibility of Rory McCann's, who portrays Sandor "The Hound" Clegane, prosthetic makeup melting off his face.

In another interview with The Hollywood Reporter, Taylor also spoke about the process of interacting with the lake and water, saying "every moment of interaction with water had to be a multiple stage process where we filmed the action on our 360 degree set and landscape, and then restage it against green screen with elements we shot in a dunk tank rig, and all of those elements get married together to form something as simple as a guy falling into the ice and plopping into the water." Four to five different shots were needed in order to accomplish this portion of the battle. Taylor described working with Vladimir Furdik, who portrays the Night King, noting that Furdik is completely covered in prosthetics, and saying "He's just delightful. There's nothing he can't do. He's a full-on actor in that role, aside from being able to do all of the action and all of the horse work. He has a beautiful face — although you lose some of that behind the Night King prosthetics." Taylor revealed that he had worked with Furdik previously, as Furdik was also a stunt performer on Thor: The Dark World.

To film the death of the dragon, Viserion, Taylor said that he "provided the shots where we knew the dragon was going to be impaled and crash", for special effects supervisor Joe Bauer to use later. But Taylor also filmed reaction shots "all along the way" while the dragon fell to its death, utilizing a tennis ball on a stick in order for the actors to understand where the dragon was in the scene, as well as a "pre-viz" and storyboards for them to understand what the final product would look like. Taylor praised Emilia Clarke's performance as Daenerys Targaryen in the scene, and he was also grateful that he was chosen to direct the dragon's death, due to his self-proclaimed past of directing pivotal death scenes in several series, including the death of Ned Stark in season one, as well as major deaths in Rome, Deadwood and The Sopranos.

Taylor also spoke about the amount of time that was intended to pass between the approach of the White Walker army, and Daenerys's arrival, saying that they were being intentionally vague, "We did a few things, like getting deliberately hazy about how much time is passing, because it's so dark in the frozen lake and you don't know how many days or nights you may have witnessed. We tried to make it a little ambiguous and give it some wiggle room on that end. We were aware that we were asking for people's suspended disbelief — plausible impossibilities is what you're aiming for."

== Reception ==
=== Ratings ===
"Beyond the Wall" was viewed by 10.24 million viewers on its initial viewing on HBO, which was less than the previous week's rating of 10.72 million viewers for the episode "Eastwatch". The episode also acquired a 4.7 rating in the 18–49 demographic, making it the highest rated show on cable television of the night. In the United Kingdom, the episode was viewed by 3.18 million viewers on Sky Atlantic, making it the highest-rated broadcast that week on its channel. It also received 0.98 million timeshift viewers.

=== Critical reception ===
"Beyond the Wall" received mostly positive reviews from critics who listed the epic scale and special effects of the battle between the White Walkers and the dragons, the interactions between the northern raiding party and Jon swearing fealty to Daenerys as highlights of the episode, although some reviewers criticized the episode for "[defying] logic". It has received an 84% rating on the review aggregator website Rotten Tomatoes from 43 reviews, with an average score of 8.3 out of 10. The site's consensus reads ""Beyond The Wall" delivered the epic battles and plot twists that are expected from the penultimate episode of a Game of Thrones season – although sometimes in ways that defied logic."

Some reviews were more negative. Terri Schwartz of IGN wrote in her review of the episode, "Game of Thrones has long set the precedent that its penultimate episodes of its seasons would be the biggest in terms of scale and, oftentimes, loss, in everything from "Baelor" to "The Rains of Castamere". In that way, "Beyond the Wall" was no different, as it arguably featured the greatest loss the series has faced to date: a dragon killed by the Night King, and even worse, resurrected by him." However, Schwartz also criticized the episode saying that it suffered "more than any other episode to date from the rushed, truncated storytelling in Season 7." Schwartz went on to also praise the interactions between the northern raiding party on their journey to find the White Walkers, and ultimately gave the episode a 6.9 out of 10. Daniel D'Addario of Time magazine wrote in his review of the episode "This episode, occupying the penultimate-in-the-season slot that has historically been the spot where the biggest moments occur, was ever-so-slightly less a barnburner than last year's 'Battle of the Bastards', for instance. But that's in part due to the increasing obviousness of the stakes." Myles McNutt of The A.V. Club spoke similarly in his comparison of the episode to the previous season's penultimate episode, questioning some of the reasoning behind the battle, writing "we have a situation here where a series of events engineered for action and suspense effectively sells out the characters involved." He also praised the episode, however, by saying "On the level of spectacle, "Beyond The Wall" is another series high point, with stellar work from returning director Alan Taylor, capturing the visceral battles that the seven men and several Red Shirts encounter on their journey. And I was charmed by the series of "walk and talks" that punctuate their travels, brief vignettes of characters like Sandor and Tormund interacting for the first time while marching toward their potential dooms." He gave the episode a B. Steve Greene of IndieWire wrote in his review, ""Beyond the Wall" might not be the best episode of the season, but it's more assuredly the most important. By bringing the season-long promise of terror and triumph in rapid succession, the series turned this vital episode into a horror story to remember."

=== Accolades ===
Year	Award	Category	Nominee(s)	Result	Ref.
2018	American Cinema Editors Awards	Best Edited One-Hour Series For Non-Commercial Television	Tim Porter	Nominated	
2018	Annie Awards	Outstanding Achievement, Character Animation in a Live Action Production	Paul Story, Todd Labonte, Matthew Muntean, Cajun Hylton, Georgy Arevshatov	Nominated	
2018	Cinema Audio Society Awards	Outstanding Achievement in Sound Mixing – Television Series – One Hour	Ronan Hill, Richard Dyer, Onnalee Blank, Mathew Waters, Brett Voss (for "Beyond the Wall")	Won	
2018	Directors Guild of America Awards	Dramatic Series	Alan Taylor	Nominated	
2018	Visual Effects Society Awards	Outstanding Visual Effects in a Photoreal Episode	Joe Bauer, Steve Kullback, Chris Baird, David Ramos, Sam Conway	Won	
2018	Visual Effects Society Awards	Outstanding Animated Character in an Episode or Real-Time Project	Paul Story, Todd Labonte, Matthew Muntean, Nicholas Wilson – "Zombie Polar Bear"	Nominated	
2018	Visual Effects Society Awards	Outstanding Created Environment in an Episode, Commercial or Real-Time Project	Daniel Villalba, Antonio Lado, José Luis Barreiro, Isaac de la Pompa – "Frozen Lake"	Won	
2018	Visual Effects Society Awards	Outstanding Effects Simulations in an Episode, Commercial, or Real-Time Project	Manuel Ramírez, Óscar Márquez, Pablo Hernández, David Gacituaga – "Frozen Lake"	Nominated	
2018	Visual Effects Society Awards	Outstanding Compositing in a Photoreal Episode	Óscar Perea, Santiago Martos, David Esteve, Michael Crane – "Frozen Lake"	Nominated	
2018	Golden Reel Awards	Best Sound Editing in Television, Short Form: Music	David Klotz	Nominated	
2018	British Academy Television Awards	Must-See Moment	"Viserion is Killed by the Night King"	Nominated	
2018	2018 Gold Derby Awards	Best Drama Episode		Nominated	
2018	Primetime Emmy Awards	Outstanding Directing for a Drama Series	Alan Taylor	Nominated	
2018	Primetime Creative Arts Emmy Awards	Outstanding Fantasy/Sci-Fi Costumes	Michele Clapton, Alexander Fordham, Emma O'Loughlin, Kate O'Farrell	Won	
2018	Primetime Creative Arts Emmy Awards	Outstanding Single-Camera Picture Editing for a Drama Series	Tim Porter	Nominated	
2018	Primetime Creative Arts Emmy Awards	Outstanding Sound Mixing for a Series	Onnalee Blank, Mathew Waters, Richard Dyer, Ronan Hill	Won	
2018	Primetime Creative Arts Emmy Awards	Outstanding Special Visual Effects	Steve Kullback, Joe Bauer, Adam Chazen, Michelle Blok, Sam Conway, Ted Rae, David Ramos, Wayne Stables, Derek Spears	Won	

== Leak ==
Similar to the fourth episode of the season, "The Spoils of War", the episode was leaked before it was set to air, on August 20, 2017. Four days before its official broadcast, HBO Spain and HBO Nordic accidentally allowed "Beyond the Wall" to be available for on-demand viewing for one hour before being removed.
