= Dragonstone (Game of Thrones episode) =

- Game of Thrones episode
- Episode no.: Season 7 Episode 1
- Directed by: Jeremy Podeswa
- Written by: David Benioff; D. B. Weiss
- Cinematography by: Gregory Middleton
- Editing by: Crispin Green
- Original air date: July 16, 2017
- Running time: 59 minutes

Guest appearances
- Jim Broadbent as Archmaester Ebrose; Pilou Asbæk as Euron Greyjoy; David Bradley as Walder Frey; Anton Lesser as Qyburn; Richard Dormer as Beric Dondarrion; Paul Kaye as Thoros of Myr; Jacob Anderson as Grey Worm; Ellie Kendrick as Meera Reed; Ben Crompton as Eddison Tollett; Hafþór Júlíus Björnsson as Gregor Clegane; Tim McInnerny as Robett Glover; Daniel Portman as Podrick Payne; Rupert Vansittart as Yohn Royce; Bella Ramsey as Lyanna Mormont; Richard Rycroft as Maester Wolkan; Lucy Hayes as Kitty Frey; James Faulkner as Randyll Tarly; Ed Sheeran as Eddie; Thomas Turgoose as Geoff; William Postlethwaite as Theo; Megan Parkinson as Alys Karstark; Harry Grasby as Ned Umber; Vladimir Furdik as the Night King; William Nevan Wilson as Baby Sam; James Robert Wilson as Baby Sam

Episode chronology
| ← Previous "The Winds of Winter" | Next → "Stormborn" |
- Game of Thrones season 7

"Dragonstone" is the first episode of the seventh season of HBO's medieval fantasy television series Game of Thrones, and the 61st overall. The seventh season premiere, the episode was written by series creators David Benioff and D. B. Weiss, and directed by Jeremy Podeswa. It first aired on July 16, 2017.

The episode's main plot focuses on Daenerys Targaryen's homecoming to Westeros at Dragonstone with her vast forces, and Cersei and Jaime Lannister's meeting with Euron Greyjoy for an alliance after the demise of House Frey. Other plotlines include Bran Stark and Meera Reed arriving at the Wall, Jon Snow making preparations to fight the Army of the Dead, and Samwell Tarly searching for information about the White Walkers at Oldtown. The episode achieved a viewership of 10.11 million during its initial broadcast in the United States, setting a new viewership record for the series.

"Dragonstone" received positive reviews from critics, who considered Arya Stark's revenge on House Frey, Sandor Clegane's atonement for his old life, and Daenerys's arrival at Dragonstone to be highlights of the episode; however, a cameo appearance by musician Ed Sheeran received criticism. At the 70th Primetime Emmy Awards, the episode won the award for Outstanding Production Design for a Fantasy Program.

The episode marks the final appearance of David Bradley (Walder Frey).

== Plot ==
=== In the Riverlands ===
Disguised as Walder Frey, Arya Stark kills all the men of House Frey with poisoned wine, avenging the Red Wedding. Arya proceeds south to assassinate Queen Cersei Lannister and makes camp with friendly Lannister soldiers.

Sandor Clegane and the Brotherhood Without Banners take shelter in the farm Sandor robbed with Arya years earlier; the farmer and his daughter are dead inside. Thoros of Myr shows Sandor a vision in the flames of White Walkers passing a mountain on the march to Eastwatch-by-the-Sea. At night, Sandor buries the bodies with Thoros.

=== Beyond the Wall ===
Bran Stark and Meera Reed arrive at the Wall. Eddison Tollett is initially suspicious of them, but lets them in when Bran reveals his knowledge of the attack at Hardhome.

Meanwhile, the White Walkers and wights march south.

=== At Winterfell ===
Jon Snow forgives Alys Karstark and Ned Umber for their fathers' betrayals of House Stark in favor of House Bolton, despite Sansa Stark's objections. Jon orders Tormund Giantsbane and the wildlings to fortify the Wall at Eastwatch-by-the-Sea, and all Northerners of age, male and female, to prepare for war. A raven message from Cersei orders Jon to swear fealty to her; Jon believes her army poses no threat to them during winter, but Sansa warns Jon not to underestimate her.

Sansa rejects Littlefinger's attempts to ingratiate himself with her. She tells Brienne of Tarth, however, that she cannot dismiss him outright because they need the Vale's military support.

=== In King's Landing ===
Cersei learns that Daenerys is on her way to Westeros with her armies and realizes she and Jaime have very few allies. Euron Greyjoy arrives in King's Landing offering Cersei an alliance and marriage. Cersei accepts the alliance but rejects the marriage proposal, deeming Euron untrustworthy; Euron declares he will win her over with a priceless gift.

=== In Oldtown ===
Archmaester Ebrose denies Samwell Tarly access to the library's restricted area; Ebrose believes in the White Walkers, but trusts the Wall will halt their march. Sam sneaks into the library at night and steals several books. He learns of a very large dragonglass deposit under Dragonstone, and informs Jon. Later, Sam encounters Jorah Mormont, who is a patient in isolation due to his greyscale. Jorah asks if Daenerys has arrived in Westeros, but Sam doesn't know.

=== At Dragonstone ===
Daenerys and her fleet arrive at Dragonstone. Entering the castle's war room, they get ready to start Daenerys' conquest of the Seven Kingdoms.

== Production ==
=== Writing ===
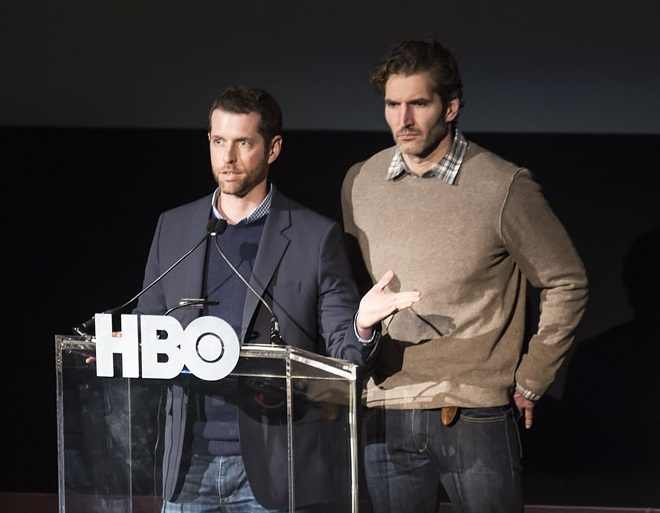
"Dragonstone" was scripted by executive producers David Benioff (right) and D. B. Weiss (left)

"Dragonstone" was written by series creators and executive producers David Benioff and D. B. Weiss. The episode, as well as the seventh season as a whole, contains original content beyond what is featured in George R. R. Martin's A Song of Ice and Fire novels from which the series is adapted.

According to Benioff, the conversation between Jon Snow and Sansa Stark shows Sansa's lingering resentment that she has been insufficiently credited for securing the alliance with the Vale. According to Weiss, the dialogue between Jaime and Cersei emphasizes that, with her children dead, Cersei is morally unconstrained and lacks Daenerys's concern for innocent people. The writers chose not to include dialogue in the scene of Daenerys's arrival at Dragonstone to preserve suspense and "honor the momentous occasion of Daenerys’s arrival".

=== Casting ===
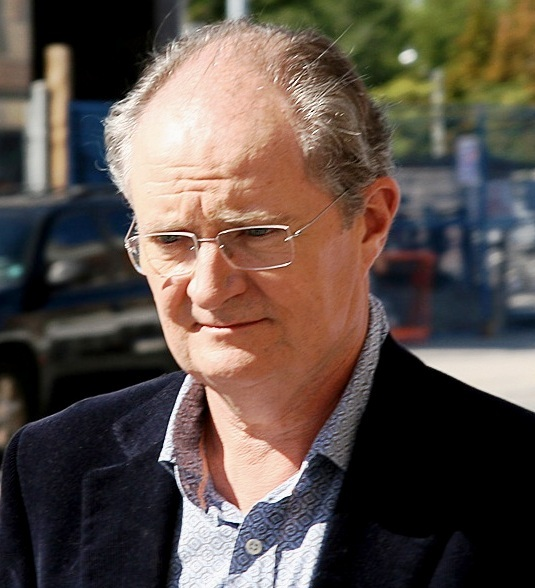
Jim Broadbent joined the series as Archmaester Ebrose

"Dragonstone" featured the introduction of Jim Broadbent as Archmaester Ebrose. His casting was first announced in August 2016 by James Hibberd of Entertainment Weekly, who revealed that he would play a "significant" role in the seventh season. In March 2017, Broadbent confirmed in an interview with ScreenCrush that he would be playing a maester and would share scenes with John Bradley, who portrays Samwell Tarly.

In March 2017, it was announced that musician Ed Sheeran would make a cameo appearance at some point during the season. Producers had been trying to bring him onto the show for several years as a surprise for Maisie Williams, who portrays Arya Stark and is a fan of Sheeran. Prior to the episode airing, Sheeran said of his appearance that: "Nothing exciting happens in this scene, we just have a conversation and that's kind of it." In the episode, Sheeran portrays a Lannister soldier who Arya comes across when she hears him singing a song. The song, titled "Hands of Gold", is adapted from George R. R. Martin's A Storm of Swords, the third book in the A Song of Ice and Fire series. In the books, the song is sung by a character named Symon Silver Tongue, who is unrelated to Sheeran's character.

=== Filming ===
"Dragonstone" was directed by Jeremy Podeswa, who previously directed the episodes "Kill the Boy", "Unbowed, Unbent, Unbroken", "The Red Woman", and "Home". In an interview with The Hollywood Reporter, Podeswa described Ed Sheeran as "lovely to work with", adding that: "I think he fit right into that world." Podeswa also noted that Sheeran requested to change the key of the song he performs in the scene.

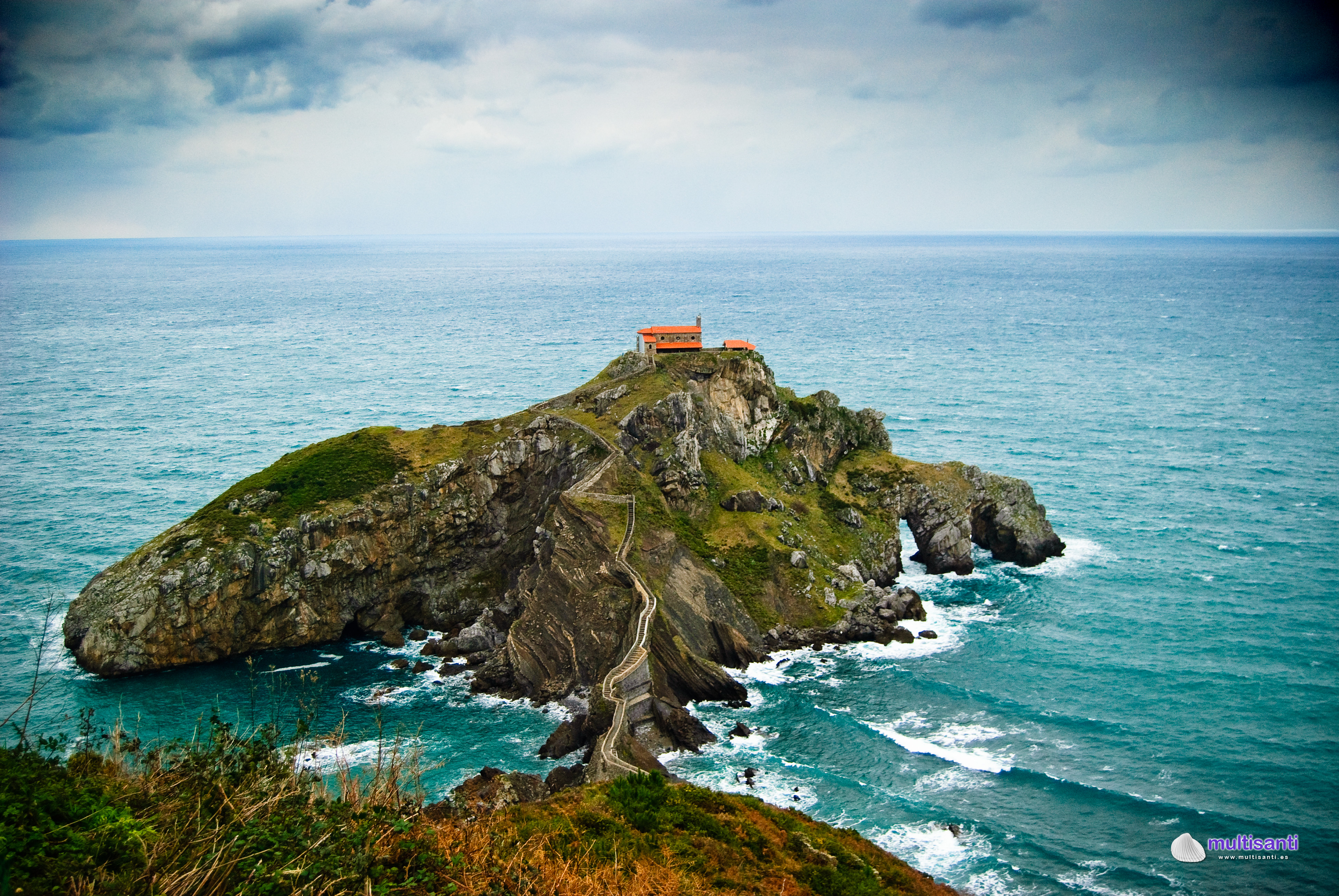
Gaztelugatxe in Spain was used for portions of the scene set on Dragonstone.

Podeswa discussed his direction for the cold open, saying he wanted to "honor the great writing", and praised Maisie Williams and David Bradley's performance as Arya Stark and Walder Frey respectively, stating "As we got more into it, you knew the audience would have questions coming right into the scene, knowing Walder Frey is dead. So, what is this? Is it a flashback? Is there something else going on here? It's about playing that line of audience surprise and curiosity and how they read the scene. David's performance is so fantastic where there's a moment you can almost feel Arya inside of him. It's even before the dialogue betrays who he is." The scene was not written as a cold open; Benioff and Weiss made that decision on the strength of Bradley's work. Following the cold open, Podeswa also spoke about directing the opening scene following the title sequence, revealing "We knew it would be one shot. Nothing fancy in terms of camerawork. But it's a shot that very slowly reveals itself over time, and we take that time. Then it was a matter of me conceptualizing it with the storyboard artists and visual effects department." Podeswa also stated that the scene ending on the eye of the giant wight was not originally in the script, but came from working with the art department for the series.

According to Podeswa, the montage of Samwell Tarly at the Citadel was originally "about seven or eight minutes" due to the amount of material filmed and that the final version was edited down significantly. For the closing scene of Daenerys Targaryen arriving at Dragonstone, Podeswa noted that very little of the scene was shot on a sound stage, but rather on location in several places, including San Juan de Gaztelugatxe, Spain. The interiors of Dragonstone were shot on a sound stage, with set designer Deb Riley creating the throne room, and redesigning the map room for the episode.

== Reception ==
=== Ratings ===
On the night of its premiere, the episode achieved a viewership of 10.11 million during its initial airing in the United States and an additional 5.99 million viewers from reruns and early streaming, totaling 16.1 million viewers. It was the most watched episode in the series' history up to that point. The episode acquired a 4.7 rating in the 18–49 demographic. On August 2, 2017, HBO announced that the episode was about to surpass 30 million U.S. viewers across all of the network's domestic platforms. In the United Kingdom, the episode was seen by 3.495 million viewers during its simulcast on Sky Atlantic, making it the highest-rated broadcast that week.

The episode inspired 2.4 million tweets during its airing, making it the show's most-tweeted episode up to that point. The episode was pirated 90 million times in the first three days followings its airing.

=== Critical reception ===
"Dragonstone" received positive reviews from critics. On the review aggregator website Rotten Tomatoes, 93% of 61 critics' reviews are positive, with an average rating of 9.0/10. The website's consensus reads: "With a blistering opening salvo, Game of Thrones charts an assured path for its anxiously-anticipated final stretch."

Matt Fowler of IGN gave the episode an 8.8 out of 10, writing that: "'Dragonstone' sublimely set the stage for Game of Thrones Season 7 with some righteous revenge, a new alliance, a dramatic (and quiet) homecoming, and a surprisingly great sequence from The Hound as he began to atone for his old life." Erik Kain of Forbes similarly praised the episode, writing: "This was easily one of my favorite season premieres of any season of Game of Thrones. It's a testament to the show's staying power and quality that even this far in, a season's first episode could be so good." Jane Mulkerrins of The Daily Telegraph wrote: "One might wonder whether the biggest, bloodiest, most Dragon-heavy show on television would still have the ability to shock and surprise. The answer, happily, is yes." Matthew Gilbert of The Boston Globe wrote: "The season premiere of Game of Thrones was thoroughly satisfying, a transporting hour that brilliantly reestablished the chessboard for the new, penultimate season."

Ed Sheeran's cameo appearance was negatively received by most audiences and caused what Forbes described as "an unusual amount of public backlash". Sheeran temporarily deleted his Twitter account shortly after the episode aired. Much of the criticism was around the fact that there seemed to have been no attempt to disguise his cameo. After the episode's airing, director Jeremy Podeswa defended Sheeran as a "lovely performer" who "deserved to be there". Sheeran later commented in 2021: "I feel like people's reaction to it sort of muddied my joy to it."

=== Awards and nominations ===
| Year | Award | Category | Nominee(s) | Result | Ref. |
|---|---|---|---|---|---|
| 2017 | American Society of Cinematographers Awards | Outstanding Achievement in Cinematography in Regular Series for Non-Commercial Television | Gregory Middleton | Nominated | |
| 2017 | Hollywood Post Alliance | Outstanding Color Grading | Joe Finley | Nominated | |
| 2017 | Hollywood Post Alliance | Outstanding Editing | Crispin Green | Nominated | |
| 2018 | Art Directors Guild Awards | One-Hour Single Camera Period Or Fantasy Television Series | Deborah Riley | Won | |
| 2018 | Primetime Creative Arts Emmy Awards | Outstanding Production Design for a Fantasy Program | Deborah Riley, Paul Ghirardani, Rob Cameron | Won | |
