= List of awards and nominations received by Game of Thrones =

Game of Thrones awards and nominations
Awards and nominations
Award	Wins	Nominations
American Film Institute Awards	8	8
American Cinema Editors Award	2	7
American Society of Cinematographers Awards	3	10
Annie Awards	0	3
Australian Production Design Guild Awards	3	3
ADG Excellence in Production Design Awards	5	8
Artios Awards	1	7
ASCAP Awards	2	2
Asian Academy Creative Awards	1	1
Astra Awards	3	4
British Academy Television Awards	1	5
British Academy Television Craft Awards	3	3
British Society of Cinematographers Awards	1	5
Canadian Society of Cinematographers Awards	2	4
Cinema Audio Society Awards	6	8
Costume Designers Guild Awards	5	8
Creative Arts Emmy Awards	47	112
Critics' Choice Television Awards	2	24
Directors Guild of America Awards	2	10
Dorian Awards	0	2
Dragon Awards	1	1
Empire Awards	1	3
E! Online Best. Ever. TV. Awards	0	1
GLAAD Media Awards	0	1
Glamour Awards	1	1
Golden Globe Awards	1	8
Golden Nymph Awards	1	5
Golden Reel Awards	11	22
Golden Trailer Awards	2	13
Gracie Awards	1	1
Grammy Awards	0	2
Guinness World Records	6	6
Hollywood Post Alliance Awards	7	19
Hollywood Music in Media Awards	0	1
Hugo Awards	3	6
Humanitas Prize	0	1
IGN Awards	9	32
IGN People's Choice Awards	16	32
International Film Music Critics Association Awards	1	4
Irish Film & Television Awards	4	28
Jupiter Awards	1	1
Kerrang! Awards	2	2
Location Managers Guild Awards	4	6
Make-Up Artists and Hair Stylists Guild Awards	6	9
MTV Fandom Awards	1	2
MTV Millennial Awards	1	1
MTV Movie & TV Awards	1	10
National Television Awards	0	4
NewNowNext Awards	0	3
People's Choice Awards	0	17
Peabody Awards	1	1
Poppy Awards	6	10
Portal Awards	7	16
Primetime Emmy Awards	59	164
Producers Guild of America Awards	1	8
Royal Television Society Awards	1	1
Satellite Awards	3	14
Saturn Awards	6	34
Scream Awards	3	8
Screen Actors Guild Awards	9	21
SFX Awards	2	13
Shorty Awards	0	2
Society of Camera Operators Awards	0	1
TCA Awards	3	16
TV Choice Awards	2	2
USC Scripter Awards	0	2
Visual Effects Society Awards	29	53
Webby Awards	6	6
Women's Image Network Awards	1	2
World Soundtrack Awards	1	2
Writers Guild of America Awards	0	10
Young Artist Awards	0	3
Young Hollywood Awards	1	3
Zulu Awards	0	1

Totals (Note: Certain award groups do not simply award one winner. They acknowledge several different recipients, have runners-up, and have third place. Since this is a specific recognition and is different from losing an award, runner-up mentions are considered wins in this award tally. For simplification and to avoid errors, each award in this list has been presumed to have had a prior nomination.)
- Wins: 272
- Nominations: 757

Game of Thrones is an American fantasy drama television series created for HBO by David Benioff and D. B. Weiss. It is an adaptation of A Song of Ice and Fire, George R. R. Martin's series of fantasy novels. The story, set on the fictional continents of Westeros and Essos, has several plot lines and a large ensemble cast. The first story arc follows a dynastic conflict among competing claimants for succession to the Iron Throne of the Seven Kingdoms, with other noble families fighting for independence from the throne. The second covers attempts to reclaim the throne by the exiled last scion of the realm's deposed ruling dynasty; the third chronicles the threat of the impending winter and the legendary creatures and fierce peoples of the North.

The series, mostly written by Benioff and Weiss, has been nominated for many awards, including eight Golden Globe Awards (one win), ten Writers Guild of America Awards, eight Producers Guild of America Awards (one win), ten Directors Guild of America Awards (two wins), eight Art Directors Guild Awards (five wins), thirty-four Saturn Awards (six wins), fourteen Satellite Awards (three wins), and a Peabody Award (one win). The series has received 164 Primetime Emmy Award nominations, including eight consecutive Outstanding Drama Series nominations, with a total of 59 wins. Game of Thrones received numerous nominations, with awards recognizing various aspects of the series such as directing, writing, cast, visual effects, or overall quality.

Peter Dinklage is the most awarded and nominated member of the cast, with recognitions such as the Primetime Emmy Award and Golden Globe for Best Supporting Actor in a Series. He is also the only member of the cast to receive an Emmy. In addition, cast members Lena Headey, Emilia Clarke, Kit Harington, Maisie Williams, Nikolaj Coster-Waldau, Alfie Allen, Sophie Turner, Gwendoline Christie, Carice van Houten, Diana Rigg, and Max von Sydow received Primetime Emmy Award nominations for their performances in the series. The rest of the cast was also praised, many receiving various award nominations, including six Screen Actors Guild Award for Outstanding Performance by an Ensemble in a Drama Series nominations rewarding all of the main cast for seasons 1, 3, 4, 5, 6 and 7. In 2015, Game of Thrones set a record for winning the highest number of Primetime Emmy Awards for a series in a single year, with 12 wins out of 24 nominations. In 2016, it became the most awarded series in Emmy Awards history, with a total of 38 wins. To date, Game of Thrones has won 272 awards out of 757 nominations. The show also holds six world records from the Guinness Book of World Records, including "Most pirated TV program" and "Largest TV drama simulcast".

== Total awards and nominations for the cast ==
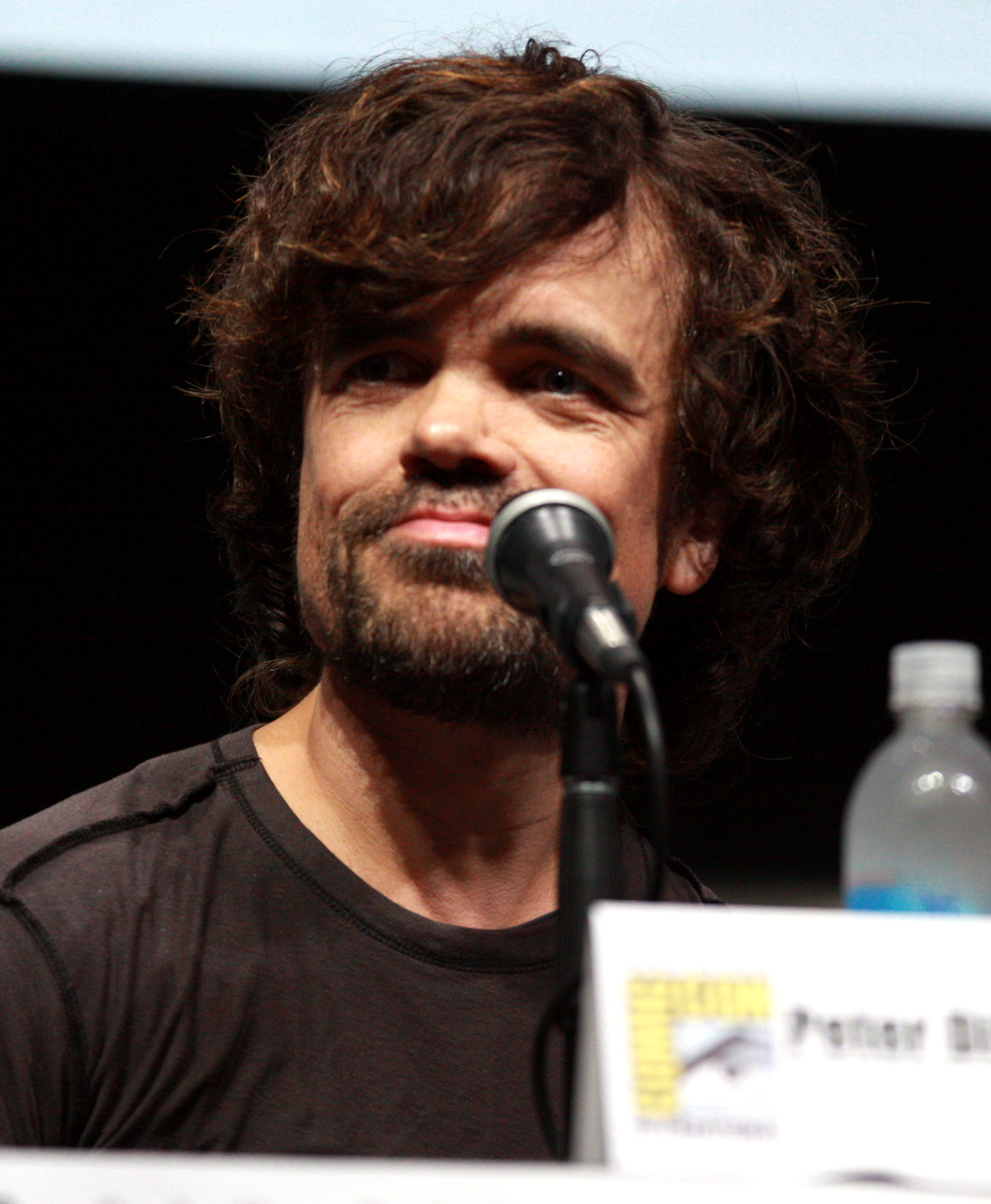
Peter Dinklage is the series's most successful cast member in terms of awards and nominations, having won 7 awards and received 40 additional nominations.

Total awards and nominations for the cast
Actor	Character	Tenure	Nominations	Awards
Peter Dinklage	Tyrion Lannister	2011–2019	40	7
Maisie Williams	Arya Stark	2011–2019	20	8
Lena Headey	Cersei Lannister	2011–2019	27	4
Emilia Clarke	Daenerys Targaryen	2011–2019	29	5
Kit Harington	Jon Snow	2011–2019	28	4
Sophie Turner	Sansa Stark	2011–2019	14	4
Diana Rigg	Olenna Tyrell	2013–2017	5	0
Sean Bean	Eddard "Ned" Stark	2011	8	3
Pedro Pascal	Oberyn Martell	2014	4	2
Jack Gleeson	Joffrey Baratheon	2011–2014	12	2
Natalie Dormer	Margaery Tyrell	2012–2016	4	2
Nikolaj Coster-Waldau	Jaime Lannister	2011–2019	15	1
Michelle Fairley	Catelyn Stark	2011–2013	7	1
Liam Cunningham	Davos Seaworth	2012–2019	8	1
Charles Dance	Tywin Lannister	2011–2015	5	1
Iain Glen	Jorah Mormont	2011–2019	7	1
Isaac Hempstead Wright	Brandon "Bran" Stark	2011–2014, 2016–2019	7	1
Gwendoline Christie	Brienne of Tarth	2012–2019	8	1
Conleth Hill	Varys	2011–2019	6	1
Nathalie Emmanuel	Missandei	2013–2019	6	1
Rory McCann	Sandor "The Hound" Clegane	2011–2014, 2016–2019	6	1
Ian McElhinney	Barristan Selmy	2011, 2013–2015	4	1
John Bradley	Samwell Tarly	2011–2019	5	1
Josef Altin	Pypar	2011, 2013–2014	4	1
Julian Glover	Pycelle	2011–2016	4	1
Mark Stanley	Grenn	2011–2014	4	1

== Significant guild and peer awards ==
Awards and nominations in this section are given by members of that specific profession's guild or trade union.

Significant guild and peer awards and nominations
Award	Year	Category	Nominee(s)	Result	Ref(s)
American Film Institute Awards	2011	Top 10 TV Programs of the Year	Game of Thrones	Won	
American Film Institute Awards	2012	Top 10 TV Programs of the Year	Game of Thrones	Won	
American Film Institute Awards	2013	Top 10 TV Programs of the Year	Game of Thrones	Won	
American Film Institute Awards	2014	Top 10 TV Programs of the Year	Game of Thrones	Won	
American Film Institute Awards	2015	Top 10 TV Programs of the Year	Game of Thrones	Won	
American Film Institute Awards	2016	Top 10 TV Programs of the Year	Game of Thrones	Won	
American Film Institute Awards	2017	Top 10 TV Programs of the Year	Game of Thrones	Won	
American Film Institute Awards	2019	Top 10 TV Programs of the Year	Game of Thrones	Won	
American Cinema Editors Award	2012	Best Edited One-Hour Series For Non-Commercial Television	Frances Parker (for "Baelor")	Nominated	
American Cinema Editors Award	2014	Best Edited One-Hour Series For Non-Commercial Television	Oral Norrie Ottey (for "The Rains of Castamere")	Nominated	
American Cinema Editors Award	2016	Best Edited One-Hour Series For Non-Commercial Television	Katie Weiland (for "The Dance of Dragons")	Nominated	
American Cinema Editors Award	2016	Best Edited One-Hour Series For Non-Commercial Television	Tim Porter (for "Hardhome")	Nominated	
American Cinema Editors Award	2017	Best Edited One-Hour Series For Non-Commercial Television	Tim Porter (for "Battle of the Bastards")	Won	
American Cinema Editors Award	2018	Best Edited Drama Series for Non-Commercial Television	Tim Porter (for "Beyond the Wall")	Nominated	
American Cinema Editors Award	2020	Best Edited Drama Series for Non-Commercial Television	Tim Porter (for "The Long Night")	Won	
American Society of Cinematographers Awards	2012	Outstanding Achievement in Cinematography in One-Hour Episodic Television Series	Kramer Morgenthau (for "The North Remembers")	Won	
American Society of Cinematographers Awards	2013	Outstanding Achievement in Cinematography in One-Hour Episodic Television Series	Jonathan Freeman (for "Valar Dohaeris")	Won	
American Society of Cinematographers Awards	2013	Outstanding Achievement in Cinematography in One-Hour Episodic Television Series	Anette Haellmigk (for "Kissed by Fire")	Nominated	
American Society of Cinematographers Awards	2014	Outstanding Achievement in Cinematography in Regular Series	Anette Haellmigk (for "The Children")	Nominated	
American Society of Cinematographers Awards	2014	Outstanding Achievement in Cinematography in Regular Series	Fabian Wagner (for "Mockingbird")	Nominated	
American Society of Cinematographers Awards	2015	Outstanding Achievement in Cinematography in Regular Series	Fabian Wagner (for "Hardhome")	Nominated	
American Society of Cinematographers Awards	2016	Outstanding Achievement in Cinematography in Regular Series	Fabian Wagner (for "Battle of the Bastards")	Won	
American Society of Cinematographers Awards	2016	Outstanding Achievement in Cinematography in Regular Series	Anette Haellmigk (for "Book of the Stranger")	Nominated	
American Society of Cinematographers Awards	2017	Outstanding Achievement in Cinematography in Regular Series for Non-Commercial Television	Robert McLachlan (for "The Spoils of War")	Nominated	
American Society of Cinematographers Awards	2017	Outstanding Achievement in Cinematography in Regular Series for Non-Commercial Television	Gregory Middleton (for "Dragonstone")	Nominated	
Annie Awards	2017	Outstanding Achievement, Character Animation in a Live Action Production	Dean Elliott, James Hollingworth, Nicholas Tripodi, Matt Weaver (for "Battle of the Bastards")	Nominated	
Annie Awards	2018	Outstanding Achievement, Character Animation in a Live Action Production	Paul Story, Todd Labonte, Matthew Muntean, Cajun Hylton, Georgy Arevshatov (for "Beyond the Wall")	Nominated	
Annie Awards	2020	Outstanding Achievement, Character Animation in a Live Action Production	Jason Snyman, Sheik Ghafoor, Maia Neubig, Michael Siegel, Cheri Fojtik (for "The Long Night")	Nominated	
Australian Production Design Guild Awards	2015	Production Design for a Television Drama	Deborah Riley	Won	
Australian Production Design Guild Awards	2016	Production Design for a Television Drama	Deborah Riley	Won	
Australian Production Design Guild Awards	2016	3D Award for Visual Effects Design	Iloura (for "Battle of the Bastards")	Won	
ADG Excellence in Production Design Awards	2012	One-Hour Single Camera Television Series	Gemma Jackson (for "A Golden Crown")	Nominated	
ADG Excellence in Production Design Awards	2013	One-Hour Single Camera Television Series	Gemma Jackson (for "The Ghost of Harrenhal")	Won	
ADG Excellence in Production Design Awards	2014	One-Hour Single Camera Television Series	Gemma Jackson (for "Valar Dohaeris")	Won	
ADG Excellence in Production Design Awards	2015	One-Hour Single Camera Fantasy Television Series	Deborah Riley (for "The Laws of Gods and Men" and "The Mountain and the Viper")	Won	
ADG Excellence in Production Design Awards	2016	One-Hour Single Camera Fantasy Television Series	Deborah Riley (for "High Sparrow", "Unbowed, Unbent, Unbroken", and "Hardhome")	Won	
ADG Excellence in Production Design Awards	2017	One-Hour Single Camera Period Or Fantasy Television Series	Deborah Riley (for "Blood of My Blood", "The Broken Man", and "No One")	Nominated	
ADG Excellence in Production Design Awards	2018	One-Hour Single Camera Period Or Fantasy Television Series	Deborah Riley (for "Dragonstone", "The Queen's Justice", and "Eastwatch")	Won	
ADG Excellence in Production Design Awards	2020	One-Hour Single Camera Period Or Fantasy Television Series	Deborah Riley (for "The Bells")	Nominated	
Artios Awards	2011	Outstanding Achievement in Casting – Television Pilot Drama	Nina Gold	Nominated	
Artios Awards	2011	Outstanding Achievement in Casting – Television Series Drama	Nina Gold	Nominated	
Artios Awards	2012	Outstanding Achievement in Casting – Television Series Drama	Nina Gold	Nominated	
Artios Awards	2013	Outstanding Achievement in Casting – Television Series Drama	Nina Gold	Nominated	
Artios Awards	2014	Outstanding Achievement in Casting – Television Series Drama	Nina Gold	Nominated	
Artios Awards	2015	Outstanding Achievement in Casting – Television Series Drama	Nina Gold	Won	
Artios Awards	2016	Outstanding Achievement in Casting – Television Series Drama	Nina Gold, Robert Sterne, Carla Stronge	Nominated	
ASCAP Awards	2012	Top Television Series	Ramin Djawadi	Won	
ASCAP Awards	2013	Top Television Series	Ramin Djawadi	Won	
Astra Awards	2012	Favourite Program – International Drama	Game of Thrones	Won	
Astra Awards	2013	Favourite Program – International Drama	Game of Thrones	Won	
Astra Awards	2014	Favourite Program – International Drama	Game of Thrones	Nominated	
Astra Awards	2015	Favourite Program – International Drama	Game of Thrones	Won	
British Academy Television Awards	2013	Best International Programme	David Benioff, D. B. Weiss, Carolyn Strauss, Frank Doelger	Nominated	
British Academy Television Awards	2013	Radio Times Audience Award	Game of Thrones	Won	
British Academy Television Awards	2015	Radio Times Audience Award	Game of Thrones	Nominated	
British Academy Television Awards	2017	Must-See Moment	"Battle of the Bastards"	Nominated	
British Academy Television Awards	2018	Must-See Moment	"Viserion is Killed by the Night King" (for "Beyond the Wall")	Nominated	
British Academy Television Craft Awards	2018	Best Costume Design	Michele Clapton	Won	
British Academy Television Craft Awards	2018	Best Production Design	Rob Cameron, Deborah Riley	Won	
British Academy Television Craft Awards	2018	Special Award	Game of Thrones	Won	
British Society of Cinematographers Awards	2012	Best Cinematography in a Television Drama	Sam McCurdy (for "Blackwater")	Nominated	
British Society of Cinematographers Awards	2015	Best Cinematography in a Television Drama	Fabian Wagner (for "Hardhome")	Nominated	
British Society of Cinematographers Awards	2015	ACO/BSC/GBCT Operators TV Drama Award	David Morgan, Sean Savage, Ben Wilson, David Worley (for "Hardhome")	Won	
British Society of Cinematographers Awards	2016	Best Cinematography in a Television Drama	Fabian Wagner (for "The Winds of Winter")	Nominated	
British Society of Cinematographers Awards	2016	ACO/BSC/GBCT Operators TV Drama Award	Sean Savage, David Morgan & John Ferguson (for "Battle of the Bastards")	Nominated	
Canadian Society of Cinematographers Awards	2015	TV series Cinematography	Robert McLachlan (for "Oathkeeper")	Nominated	
Canadian Society of Cinematographers Awards	2016	TV series Cinematography	Robert McLachlan (for "The Dance of Dragons")	Won	
Canadian Society of Cinematographers Awards	2016	TV series Cinematography	Gregory Middleton (for "Unbowed, Unbent, Unbroken")	Nominated	
Canadian Society of Cinematographers Awards	2017	TV series Cinematography	Gregory Middleton (for "Home")	Won	
Cinema Audio Society Awards	2012	Outstanding Achievement in Sound Mixing – Television Series – One Hour	Ronan Hill, Mark Taylor (for "Baelor")	Nominated	
Cinema Audio Society Awards	2013	Outstanding Achievement in Sound Mixing – Television Series – One Hour	Ronan Hill, Onnalee Blank, Mathew Waters, and Brett Voss (for "Blackwater")	Nominated	
Cinema Audio Society Awards	2014	Outstanding Achievement in Sound Mixing – Television Series – One Hour	Ronan Hill, Onnalee Blank, Mathew Waters, and Brett Voss (for "The Rains of Castamere")	Won	
Cinema Audio Society Awards	2015	Outstanding Achievement in Sound Mixing – Television Series – One Hour	Ronan Hill, Richard Dyer, Onnalee Blank, Mathew Waters, Brett Voss (for "The Children")	Won	
Cinema Audio Society Awards	2016	Outstanding Achievement in Sound Mixing – Television Series – One Hour	Ronan Hill, Richard Dyer, Onnalee Blank, Mathew Waters, Brett Voss (for "Hardhome")	Won	
Cinema Audio Society Awards	2017	Outstanding Achievement in Sound Mixing – Television Series – One Hour	Ronan Hill, Onnalee Blank, Mathew Waters, Richard Dyer, Brett Voss (for "Battle of the Bastards")	Won	
Cinema Audio Society Awards	2018	Outstanding Achievement in Sound Mixing – Television Series – One Hour	Ronan Hill, Richard Dyer, Onnalee Blank, Mathew Waters, Brett Voss (for "Beyond the Wall")	Won	
Cinema Audio Society Awards	2020	Outstanding Achievement in Sound Mixing – Television Series – One Hour	Ronan Hill, Simon Kerr, Daniel Crowley, Onnalee Blank, Mathew Waters, Brett Voss (for "The Bells")	Won	
Costume Designers Guild Awards	2012	Outstanding Period/Fantasy Television Series	Michele Clapton	Nominated	
Costume Designers Guild Awards	2013	Outstanding Period/Fantasy Television Series	Michele Clapton	Nominated	
Costume Designers Guild Awards	2014	Outstanding Period/Fantasy Television Series	Michele Clapton	Nominated	
Costume Designers Guild Awards	2015	Outstanding Period/Fantasy Television Series	Michele Clapton	Won	
Costume Designers Guild Awards	2016	Outstanding Fantasy Television Series	Michele Clapton	Won	
Costume Designers Guild Awards	2017	Outstanding Fantasy Television Series	Michele Clapton, April Ferry	Won	
Costume Designers Guild Awards	2018	Outstanding Sci-Fi/Fantasy Television Series	Michele Clapton	Won	
Costume Designers Guild Awards	2020	Outstanding Sci-Fi/Fantasy Television Series	Michele Clapton	Won	
Directors Guild of America Awards	2012	Dramatic Series	Tim Van Patten (for "Winter Is Coming")	Nominated	
Directors Guild of America Awards	2014	Dramatic Series	David Nutter (for "The Rains of Castamere")	Nominated	
Directors Guild of America Awards	2015	Dramatic Series	Alex Graves (for "The Children")	Nominated	
Directors Guild of America Awards	2016	Dramatic Series	David Nutter (for "Mother's Mercy")	Won	
Directors Guild of America Awards	2017	Dramatic Series	Miguel Sapochnik (for "Battle of the Bastards")	Won	
Directors Guild of America Awards	2018	Dramatic Series	Jeremy Podeswa (for "The Dragon and the Wolf")	Nominated	
Directors Guild of America Awards	2018	Dramatic Series	Matt Shakman (for "The Spoils of War")	Nominated	
Directors Guild of America Awards	2018	Dramatic Series	Alan Taylor (for "Beyond the Wall")	Nominated	
Directors Guild of America Awards	2020	Dramatic Series	David Nutter (for "The Last of the Starks")	Nominated	
Directors Guild of America Awards	2020	Dramatic Series	Miguel Sapochnik (for "The Long Night")	Nominated	
Golden Reel Awards	2012	Best Sound Editing – Short Form Dialogue and ADR in Television	Game of Thrones (for "Cripples, Bastards, and Broken Things")	Won	
Golden Reel Awards	2012	Best Sound Editing – Short Form Sound Effects and Foley in Television	Game of Thrones (for "Winter is Coming")	Won	
Golden Reel Awards	2013	Best Sound Editing – Long Form Dialogue and ADR in Television	Game of Thrones (for "Valar Morghulis")	Won	
Golden Reel Awards	2013	Best Sound Editing – Long Form Sound Effects and Foley in Television	Game of Thrones (for "Valar Morghulis")	Won	
Golden Reel Awards	2013	Best Sound Editing – Short Form Dialogue and ADR in Television	Game of Thrones (for "Blackwater")	Nominated	
Golden Reel Awards	2013	Best Sound Editing – Short Form Music in Television	Game of Thrones (for "Blackwater")	Nominated	
Golden Reel Awards	2013	Best Sound Editing – Short Form Sound Effects and Foley in Television	Game of Thrones (for "Blackwater")	Nominated	
Golden Reel Awards	2014	Best Sound Editing – Short Form Dialogue and ADR in Television	Jed Dodge and Tim Hands (for "The Rains of Castamere")	Won	
Golden Reel Awards	2014	Best Sound Editing – Short Form Music	David Klotz (for "The Rains of Castamere")	Won	
Golden Reel Awards	2014	Best Sound Editing – Short Form Sound Effects and Foley	Tim Kimmel (for "The Rains of Castamere")	Nominated	
Golden Reel Awards	2015	Best Sound Editing in Television, Short Form: FX/Foley	Game of Thrones (for "The Children")	Won	
Golden Reel Awards	2015	Best Sound Editing in Television, Short Form: Dialogue / ADR	Game of Thrones (for "The Children")	Nominated	
Golden Reel Awards	2015	Best Sound Editing in Television, Short Form: Music	Game of Thrones (for "The Watchers on the Wall")	Nominated	
Golden Reel Awards	2016	Best Sound Editing in Television, Short Form: FX/Foley	Tim Kimmel (for "Hardhome")	Won	
Golden Reel Awards	2016	Best Sound Editing in Television, Short Form: Dialogue / ADR	Tim Kimmel (for "Hardhome")	Won	
Golden Reel Awards	2016	Best Sound Editing in Television, Short Form: Music	David Klotz (for "Hardhome")	Nominated	
Golden Reel Awards	2017	Best Sound Editing in Television, Short Form: FX/Foley	Tim Kimmel, Brett Voss, John Matter, Jeffrey Wilhoit, Dylan Wilhoit, Paula Fairfield and Bradley Katona (for "Battle of the Bastards")	Nominated	
Golden Reel Awards	2017	Best Sound Editing in Television, Short Form: Dialogue / ADR	Tim Kimmel and Tim Hands (for "Battle of the Bastards")	Nominated	
Golden Reel Awards	2017	Best Sound Editing in Television, Short Form: Music	David Klotz (for "Battle of the Bastards")	Nominated	
Golden Reel Awards	2018	Best Sound Editing in Television, Short Form: FX/Foley	Tim Kimmel, Paula Fairfield, Bradley Katona, Brett Voss and Jeffrey Wilhoit (for "The Spoils of War")	Won	
Golden Reel Awards	2018	Best Sound Editing in Television, Short Form: Dialogue / ADR	Tim Kimmel, Paul Bercovitch and Tim Hands (for "The Spoils of War")	Won	
Golden Reel Awards	2018	Best Sound Editing in Television, Short Form: Music	David Klotz (for "Beyond the Wall")	Nominated	
Grammy Awards	2018	Best Score Soundtrack for Visual Media	Ramin Djawadi (for Game of Thrones: Season 7)	Nominated	
Grammy Awards	2020	Best Score Soundtrack for Visual Media	Ramin Djawadi (for Game of Thrones: Season 8)	Nominated	
Hollywood Post Alliance Awards	2012	Outstanding Visual Effects – Television	Joe Finley (for "The Prince of Winterfell")	Won	
Hollywood Post Alliance Awards	2013	Outstanding Color Grading – Television	Joe Finley (for "Kissed by Fire")	Nominated	
Hollywood Post Alliance Awards	2013	Outstanding Sound – Television	Paula Fairfield, Brad Katona, Jed Dodge, Onnalee Blank and Mathew Waters (for "The Climb")	Won	
Hollywood Post Alliance Awards	2013	Outstanding Visual Effects – Television	Joe Bauer and Jabbar Raisani, Jörn Grosshans and Sven Martin, and Doug Campbell (for "Valar Dohaeris")	Won	
Hollywood Post Alliance Awards	2014	Outstanding Sound	Tim Kimmel, Onnalee Blank, Mathew Waters, Paula Fairfield, Brad Katona and Jed M. Dodge (for "The Children")	Nominated	
Hollywood Post Alliance Awards	2014	Outstanding Color Grading	Joe Finley (for "Mockingbird")	Nominated	
Hollywood Post Alliance Awards	2014	Outstanding Visual Effects	Joe Bauer, Sven Martin, Jörn Grosshans, Thomas Schelesny, Matthew Rouleau (for "The Children")	Won	
Hollywood Post Alliance Awards	2015	Outstanding Sound	Tim Kimmel, Paula Fairfield, Bradley Katona, Paul Bercovitch, Onnalee Blank, Mathew Waters (for "Hardhome")	Nominated	
Hollywood Post Alliance Awards	2015	Outstanding Color Grading	Joe Finley (for "Hardhome")	Nominated	
Hollywood Post Alliance Awards	2015	Outstanding Editing	Tim Porter (for "Hardhome")	Nominated	
Hollywood Post Alliance Awards	2015	Outstanding Visual Effects	Joe Bauer, Steve Kullback, Derek Spears, Eric Carney, Jabbar Raisani (for "The Dance of Dragons")	Won	
Hollywood Post Alliance Awards	2016	Outstanding Sound	Tim Kimmel, Paula Fairfield, Mathew Waters, Onnalee Blank, Bradley Katona, Paul Bercovitch (for "Battle of the Bastards")	Nominated	
Hollywood Post Alliance Awards	2016	Outstanding Editing	Tim Porter (for "Battle of the Bastards")	Won	
Hollywood Post Alliance Awards	2016	Outstanding Visual Effects	Joe Bauer, Eric Carney, Derek Spears, Glenn Melenhorst, Matthew Rouleau (for "Battle of the Bastards")	Won	
Hollywood Post Alliance Awards	2017	Outstanding Color Grading	Joe Finley (for "Dragonstone")	Nominated	
Hollywood Post Alliance Awards	2017	Outstanding Editing	Tim Porter (for "Stormborn")	Nominated	
Hollywood Post Alliance Awards	2017	Outstanding Editing	Jesse Parker (for "The Queen's Justice")	Nominated	
Hollywood Post Alliance Awards	2017	Outstanding Editing	Crispin Green (for "Dragonstone")	Nominated	
Hollywood Post Alliance Awards	2017	Outstanding Sound	Tim Kimmel, Paula Fairfield, Mathew Waters, Onnalee Blank, Bradley C. Katona, Paul Bercovitch (for "The Spoils of War")	Nominated	
Irish Film & Television Awards	2012	Best Television Drama	Mark Huffam	Nominated	
Irish Film & Television Awards	2012	Best Director Television Drama	Brian Kirk	Nominated	
Irish Film & Television Awards	2012	Best Actress – Television	Michelle Fairley	Nominated	
Irish Film & Television Awards	2012	Best Supporting Actor – Television	Aidan Gillen	Nominated	
Irish Film & Television Awards	2012	Best Sound (Film/TV Drama)	Ronan Hill	Nominated	
Irish Film & Television Awards	2012	Best Sound	Ronan Hill	Nominated	
Irish Film & Television Awards	2013	Best Television Drama	Game of Thrones	Nominated	
Irish Film & Television Awards	2013	Best Director of Photography	P.J. Dillon	Nominated	
Irish Film & Television Awards	2013	Best Sound	Ronan Hill, Mervyn Moore	Nominated	
Irish Film & Television Awards	2014	Best Television Drama	Game of Thrones	Nominated	
Irish Film & Television Awards	2014	Actor in a Supporting Role – Television	Liam Cunningham	Nominated	
Irish Film & Television Awards	2014	Actor in a Supporting Role – Television	Aidan Gillen	Nominated	
Irish Film & Television Awards	2014	Actress in a Supporting Role – Television	Michelle Fairley	Won	
Irish Film & Television Awards	2014	Best Sound	Ronan Hill	Won	
Irish Film & Television Awards	2015	Best Television Drama	Game of Thrones	Nominated	
Irish Film & Television Awards	2015	Actor in a Supporting Role – Television	Liam Cunningham	Nominated	
Irish Film & Television Awards	2015	Best Sound	Game of Thrones	Nominated	
Irish Film & Television Awards	2016	Best Television Drama	Game of Thrones	Nominated	
Irish Film & Television Awards	2016	Actor in a Supporting Role – Television	Liam Cunningham	Nominated	
Irish Film & Television Awards	2017	Best Television Drama	Game of Thrones	Nominated	
Irish Film & Television Awards	2017	Actor in a Supporting Role – Television	Liam Cunningham	Nominated	
Irish Film & Television Awards	2017	Best Sound	Ronan Hill, Onnalee Blank and Matthew Waters	Nominated	
Irish Film & Television Awards	2017	Best VFX	Ed Bruce & Nicholas Murphy	Nominated	
Irish Film & Television Awards	2018	Best Television Drama	Game of Thrones	Won	
Irish Film & Television Awards	2018	Actor in a Supporting Role – Television	Liam Cunningham	Won	
Irish Film & Television Awards	2018	Actor in a Supporting Role – Television	Aidan Gillen	Nominated	
Irish Film & Television Awards	2018	Best Sound	Ronan Hill, Onnalee Blank and Matthew Waters	Nominated	
Irish Film & Television Awards	2018	Best VFX	Ed Bruce & Nicholas Murphy	Nominated	
Location Managers Guild Awards	2014	Outstanding Achievement by a Location Professional in Television	Robert Boake	Won	
Location Managers Guild Awards	2014	Outstanding use of Locations in Television	Game of Thrones	Won	
Location Managers Guild Awards	2016	Outstanding Locations in Period Television	Robert Boake and Tate Araez	Won	
Location Managers Guild Awards	2017	Outstanding Locations in Period Television	Matt Jones and Naomi Liston	Nominated	
Location Managers Guild Awards	2018	Outstanding Locations in Period Television	Robert Boake, Matt Jones, Pedro Tate Araez	Won	
Location Managers Guild Awards	2019	Outstanding Locations in a Period Television Series	Robert Boake	Nominated	
Make-Up Artists and Hair Stylists Guild Awards	2014	Best Period and/or Character Makeup – Television	Paul Engelen, Melissa Lackersteen	Nominated	
Make-Up Artists and Hair Stylists Guild Awards	2016	Best Period and/or Character Makeup – Television	Jane Walker	Won	
Make-Up Artists and Hair Stylists Guild Awards	2016	Best Period and/or Character Hair Styling – Television	Kevin Alexander, Candice Banks	Won	
Make-Up Artists and Hair Stylists Guild Awards	2017	Best Period and/or Character Makeup – Television	Jane Walker, Kay Bilk	Won	
Make-Up Artists and Hair Stylists Guild Awards	2017	Best Period and/or Character Hair Styling – Television	Kevin Alexander, Candice Banks	Won	
Make-Up Artists and Hair Stylists Guild Awards	2017	Best Special Makeup Effects – Television	Barrie Gower, Sarah Gower	Nominated	
Make-Up Artists and Hair Stylists Guild Awards	2018	Best Period and/or Character Makeup – Television	Jane Walker, Nicola Matthews	Won	
Make-Up Artists and Hair Stylists Guild Awards	2018	Best Period and/or Character Hair Styling – Television	Kevin Alexander, Candice Banks	Nominated	
Make-Up Artists and Hair Stylists Guild Awards	2018	Best Special Makeup Effects – Television	Barrie Gower, Sarah Gower	Won	
Producers Guild of America Awards	2012	Norman Felton Award for Outstanding Producer of Episodic Television, Drama	David Benioff, Frank Doelger, Mark Huffam, Carolyn Strauss, D. B. Weiss	Nominated	
Producers Guild of America Awards	2013	Norman Felton Award for Outstanding Producer of Episodic Television, Drama	David Benioff, Bernadette Caulfield, Frank Doelger, Carolyn Strauss, D. B. Weiss	Nominated	
Producers Guild of America Awards	2014	Norman Felton Award for Outstanding Producer of Episodic Television, Drama	David Benioff, Bernadette Caulfield, Frank Doelger, Christopher Newman, Greg Spence, Carolyn Strauss, and D. B. Weiss	Nominated	
Producers Guild of America Awards	2015	Norman Felton Award for Outstanding Producer of Episodic Television, Drama	David Benioff, Bernadette Caulfield, Frank Doelger, Chris Newman, Greg Spence, Carolyn Strauss, D. B. Weiss	Nominated	
Producers Guild of America Awards	2016	Norman Felton Award for Outstanding Producer of Episodic Television, Drama	David Benioff, D. B. Weiss, Bernadette Caulfield, Frank Doelger, Carolyn Strauss, Bryan Cogman, Lisa McAtackney, Chris Newman, Greg Spence	Won	
Producers Guild of America Awards	2017	Norman Felton Award for Outstanding Producer of Episodic Television, Drama	David Benioff, D. B. Weiss, Bernadette Caulfield, Frank Doelger, Carolyn Strauss, Bryan Cogman, Lisa McAtackney, Chris Newman, Greg Spence	Nominated	
Producers Guild of America Awards	2018	Norman Felton Award for Outstanding Producer of Episodic Television, Drama	David Benioff, D. B. Weiss, Bernadette Caulfield, Frank Doelger, Carolyn Strauss, Bryan Cogman, Lisa McAtackney, Chris Newman, Greg Spence	Nominated	
Producers Guild of America Awards	2020	Norman Felton Award for Outstanding Producer of Episodic Television, Drama	David Benioff, D. B. Weiss, Carolyn Strauss, Bernadette Caulfield, Frank Doelger, David Nutter, Miguel Sapochnik, Bryan Cogman, Chris Newman, Greg Spence, Lisa McAtackney, Duncan Muggoch	Nominated	
Screen Actors Guild Awards	2012	Outstanding Performance by an Ensemble in a Drama Series	Amrita Acharia, Mark Addy, Alfie Allen, Josef Altin, Sean Bean, Susan Brown, Emilia Clarke, Nikolaj Coster-Waldau, Peter Dinklage, Ron Donachie, Michelle Fairley, Jerome Flynn, Elyes Gabel, Aidan Gillen, Jack Gleeson, Iain Glen, Julian Glover, Kit Harington, Lena Headey, Isaac Hempstead Wright, Conleth Hill, Richard Madden, Jason Momoa, Rory McCann, Ian McElhinney, Luke McEwan, Roxanne McKee, Dar Salim, Mark Stanley, Donald Sumpter, Sophie Turner, and Maisie Williams	Nominated	
Screen Actors Guild Awards	2012	Outstanding Performance by a Stunt Ensemble in a Television Series	Game of Thrones	Won	
Screen Actors Guild Awards	2013	Outstanding Performance by a Stunt Ensemble in a Television Series	Rob Cooper, Jamie Edgell, Dave Fisher, Dave Forman, Paul Herbert, Michelle McKeown, Sian Miline, Jimmy O'Dee, Domonkos Pardanyi, Marcus Shakesheff, CC Smiff, and Mark Southworth	Won	
Screen Actors Guild Awards	2014	Outstanding Performance by a Male Actor in a Drama Series	Peter Dinklage	Nominated	
Screen Actors Guild Awards	2014	Outstanding Performance by an Ensemble in a Drama Series	Alfie Allen, John Bradley, Oona Chaplin, Gwendoline Christie, Emilia Clarke, Nikolaj Coster-Waldau, Mackenzie Crook, Charles Dance, Joe Dempsie, Peter Dinklage, Natalie Dormer, Nathalie Emmanuel, Michelle Fairley, Jack Gleeson, Iain Glen, Kit Harington, Lena Headey, Isaac Hempstead Wright, Kristofer Hivju, Paul Kaye, Sibel Kekilli, Rose Leslie, Richard Madden, Rory McCann, Michael McElhatton, Ian McElhinney, Philip McGinley, Hannah Murray, Iwan Rheon, Sophie Turner, Carice Van Houten, and Maisie Williams	Nominated	
Screen Actors Guild Awards	2014	Outstanding Performance by a Stunt Ensemble in a Television Series	Rachelle Beinart, Richard Bradshaw, Ben Dimmock, Levan Doran, Jamie Edgell, Bradley Farmer, Jozsef Fodor, Dave Forman, Paul Herbert, Paul Howell, Daniel Naprous, Florian Robin, CC Smiff, and Roy Taylor	Won	
Screen Actors Guild Awards	2015	Outstanding Performance by a Male Actor in a Drama Series	Peter Dinklage	Nominated	
Screen Actors Guild Awards	2015	Outstanding Performance by an Ensemble in a Drama Series	Josef Altin, Jacob Anderson, John Bradley, Dominic Carter, Gwendoline Christie, Emilia Clarke, Nikolaj Coster-Waldau, Ben Crompton, Charles Dance, Peter Dinklage, Natalie Dormer, Nathalie Emmanuel, Iain Glen, Julian Glover, Kit Harington, Lena Headey, Conleth Hill, Rory McCann, Ian McElhinney, Pedro Pascal, Daniel Portman, Mark Stanley, Sophie Turner, and Maisie Williams	Nominated	
Screen Actors Guild Awards	2015	Outstanding Performance by a Stunt Ensemble in a Television Series	Lucy Allen, Cole Armitage, Gary Arthurs, Rachelle Beinart, Ferenc Berecz, Richard Bradshaw, Andy Butcher, Michael Byrch, Neil Chapelhow, Nick Chopping, Jonathan Cohen, Joel Conlan, Gary Connery, James Cox, Tom Cox, Jason Curle, Nicholas Daines, Bill Davey, Kelly J. Dent, Ben Dimmock, Levan Doran, Jamie Edgell, Bradley Farmer, Neil Finnighan, Jozsef Fodor, Dean Forster, David Garrick, James Grogan, Tim Halloran, Paul Heasman, Robert Hladik, Al Holland, Gergely Horpacsi, Paul Howell, Stewart James, Gary Kane, Ian Kay, Robbie Keane, George Kirby, Cristian Knight, Laszlo Kosa, Geza Kovacs, Norbert Kovacs, Guy List, Phil Lonergan, Russell Macleod, Tina Maskell, Adrian McGaw, Nick McKinless, Erol Mehmet, Andy Merchant, Sian Milne, Daniel Naprous, Chris Newton, Ray Nicholas, Bela Orsanyi, Sam Parham, Ian Pead, Justin Pearson, Martin Pemberton, Heather Phillips, Rashid Phoenix, Andy Pilgrim, Christopher Pocock, Curtis Rivers, Marcus Shakesheff, Matt Sherren, Anthony Skrimshire, Mark Slaughter, Karen Smithson, Mark Southworth, Helen Steinway Bailey, Shane Steyn, Matthew Stirling, John Street, Gaspar Szabo, Gabor Szeman, Roy Taylor, Gyula Toth, Tony Van Silva, Reg Wayment, Linda Weal, Richard J Wheeldon, Heron White, Maxine Whittaker, Simon Whyman, Donna C. Williams, Lou Wong, Annabel E. Wood, Liang Yang, and Steen Young	Won	
Screen Actors Guild Awards	2016	Outstanding Performance by a Male Actor in a Drama Series	Peter Dinklage	Nominated	
Screen Actors Guild Awards	2016	Outstanding Performance by an Ensemble in a Drama Series	Alfie Allen, Ian Beattie, John Bradley, Gwendoline Christie, Emilia Clarke, Michael Condron, Nikolaj Coster-Waldau, Ben Crompton, Liam Cunningham, Stephen Dillane, Peter Dinklage, Nathalie Emmanuel, Tara Fitzgerald, Jerome Flynn, Brian Fortune, Joel Fry, Aidan Gillen, Iain Glen, Kit Harington, Lena Headey, Michiel Huisman, Hannah Murray, Brenock O'Connor, Daniel Portman, Iwan Rheon, Owen Teale, Sophie Turner, Carice Van Houten, Maisie Williams, and Tom Wlaschiha	Nominated	
Screen Actors Guild Awards	2016	Outstanding Performance by a Stunt Ensemble in a Television Series	Boian Anev, Richard Bradshaw, Jonathan Cohen, Christopher Cox, Jacob Cox, Matt Crook, Rob DeGroot, Levan Doran, Clint Elvy, James Embree, Bradley Farmer, Richard Hansen, Bobby Holland-Hanton, Radoslav Ignatov, Borislav Iliev, Rowley Irlam, Erol Ismail, Milen Kaleychev, Paul Lowe, Jonathan McBride, Sian Milne, David Newton, Radoslav Parvanov, Ian Pead, Jan Petrina, Rashid Phoenix, Andy Pilgrim, Dominic Preece, Marc Redmond, Paul Shapcott, Ryan Stuart, Pablo Verdejo, Calvin Warrington-Heasman, Annabel E. Wood, Danko Yordanov, and Lewis Young	Won	
Screen Actors Guild Awards	2017	Outstanding Performance by a Male Actor in a Drama Series	Peter Dinklage	Nominated	
Screen Actors Guild Awards	2017	Outstanding Performance by an Ensemble in a Drama Series	Alfie Allen, Jacob Anderson, Dean-Charles Chapman, Emilia Clarke, Nikolaj Coster-Waldau, Liam Cunningham, Peter Dinklage, Nathalie Emmanuel, Kit Harington, Lena Headey, Conleth Hill, Kristofer Hivju, Michiel Huisman, Faye Marsay, Jonathan Pryce, Sophie Turner, Carice Van Houten, Gemma Whelan, and Maisie Williams	Nominated	
Screen Actors Guild Awards	2017	Outstanding Performance by a Stunt Ensemble in a Television Series	Boian Anev, Kristina Baskett, Rachelle Beinart, Richard Bradshaw, Michael Byrch, Nick Chopping, Christopher Cox, Jake Cox, David Cronnelly, Matt Crook, Levan Doran, Bradley Farmer, Vladimir Furdik, Richard Hansen, Rob Hayns, Paul Howell, Rowley Irlam, Erol Ismail, Milen Kaleychev, Leigh Maddern, Jonathan McBride, Leona McCarron, Kim McGarrity, Richard Mead, Casey Michaels, Sian Milne, David Newton, Jason Otelle, Radoslav Parvanov, Ian Pead, Rashid Phoenix, Andy Pilgrim, Marc Redmond, Paul Shapcott, Jonny Stockwell, Ryan Stuart, Edward Upcott, and Leo Woodruff	Won	
Screen Actors Guild Awards	2018	Outstanding Performance by a Male Actor in a Drama Series	Peter Dinklage	Nominated	
Screen Actors Guild Awards	2018	Outstanding Performance by an Ensemble in a Drama Series	Alfie Allen, Jacob Anderson, Emilia Clarke, Nikolaj Coster-Waldau, Liam Cunningham, Peter Dinklage, Nathalie Emmanuel, James Faulkner, Jerome Flynn, Aidan Gillen, Iain Glen, Kit Harington, Lena Headey, Isaac Hempstead Wright, Conleth Hill, Kristofer Hivju, Tom Hopper, Anton Lesser, Rory McCann, Sophie Turner, Carice Van Houten, Gemma Whelan, Rupert Vansittart, and Maisie Williams	Nominated	
Screen Actors Guild Awards	2018	Outstanding Performance by a Stunt Ensemble in a Television Series	Boian Anev, Mark Archer, Luis Miguel Arranz, Ferenc Berecz, Richard Bradshaw, Michael Byrch, Nick Chopping, Jonathan Cohen, Chris Cox, Jake Cox, James Cox, David Cronnelly, Matt Crook, Ricardo Cruz Jr., Jason Curle, Levan Doran, Daniel Euston, Bradley Farmer, Pete Ford, Vladimir Furdik, Eduardo Gago, Angel Gomez, David Grant, Lawrence Hansen, Richard Hansen, Nicklas Hansson, Rob Hayns, Bobby Holland Hanton, Paul Howell, Radoslav Ignatov, Rowley Irlam, Erol Ismail, Orsányi Iván, Sonny Louis, Leigh Maddern, Jonny McBride, Leona McCarron, Kim McGarrity, Trayan Milenov-Troy, Sian Milne, David Newton, Jason Oettle, Radoslav Parvanov, Ian Pead, Andy Pilgrim, Oleg Podobin, Marc Redmond, Andrej Riabokon, Florian Robin, Doug Robson, Fabio Santos, Stanislav Satko, Paul Shapcott, Mark Slaughter, CC Smiff, James Stewart, Jonny Stockwell, Ryan Stuart, Gáspár Szabó, Lukas Tomsik, Marek Toth, Teodor Tzolov, Raycho Vasilev, Calvin Warrington-Heasman, Annabel Wood, Leo Woodruff, and Lewis Young	Won	
Screen Actors Guild Awards	2020	Outstanding Performance by a Male Actor in a Drama Series	Peter Dinklage	Won	
Screen Actors Guild Awards	2020	Outstanding Performance by an Ensemble in a Drama Series	Alfie Allen, Pilou Asbæk, Jacob Anderson, John Bradley, Gwendoline Christie, Emilia Clarke, Nikolaj Coster-Waldau, Ben Crompton, Liam Cunningham, Joe Dempsie, Peter Dinklage, Richard Dormer, Nathalie Emmanuel, Jerome Flynn, Iain Glen, Kit Harington, Lena Headey, Isaac Hempstead Wright, Conleth Hill, Kristofer Hivju, Rory McCann, Hannah Murray, Staz Nair, Daniel Portman, Bella Ramsey, Richard Rycroft, Sophie Turner, Rupert Vansittart, and Maisie Williams	Nominated	
Screen Actors Guild Awards	2020	Outstanding Performance by a Stunt Ensemble in a Television Series	Game of Thrones	Won	
Society of Camera Operators Awards	2017	Camera Operator of the Year – Television	Sean Savage	Nominated	
Visual Effects Society Awards	2012	Outstanding Animated Character in a Commercial or Broadcast Program	Henry Badgett, Mark Brown, Rafael Morant, James Sutton (for "Fire and Blood")	Nominated	
Visual Effects Society Awards	2012	Outstanding Created Environment in a Commercial or Broadcast Program	Markus Kuha, Damien Macé, Dante Harbridge Robinson, Fani Vassiadi (for "The Icewall")	Won	
Visual Effects Society Awards	2012	Outstanding Supporting Visual Effects in a Broadcast Program	Lucy Ainsworth-Taylor, Angela Barson, Ed Bruce, Adam McInnes (for "Winter Is Coming")	Won	
Visual Effects Society Awards	2013	Outstanding Animated Character in a Commercial or Broadcast Program	Irfan Celik, Florian Friedmann, Ingo Schachner, Chris Stenner (for "Training the Dragons")	Won	
Visual Effects Society Awards	2013	Outstanding Compositing in a Broadcast Program	Falk Boje, Esther Engel, Alexey Kuchinsky, Klaus Wuchta (for "White Walker Army")	Won	
Visual Effects Society Awards	2013	Outstanding Created Environment in a Commercial or Broadcast Program	Rene Borst, Thilo Ewers, Adam Figielski, Jonas Stuckenbrock (for "Pyke")	Won	
Visual Effects Society Awards	2013	Outstanding Visual Effects in a Broadcast Program	Rainer Gombos, Steve Kullback, Sven Martin, Juri Stanossek (for "Valar Morghulis")	Won	
Visual Effects Society Awards	2014	Outstanding Animated Character in a Broadcast	Philip Meyer, Ingo Schachner, Travis Nobles, Florian Friedmann (for "Raising the Dragons")	Nominated	
Visual Effects Society Awards	2014	Outstanding Compositing in a Broadcast Program	Kirk Brillon, Steve Gordon, Geoff Sayer, Winston Lee (for "The Climb")	Won	
Visual Effects Society Awards	2014	Outstanding Created Environment in a Broadcast Program	Patrick Zentis, Mayur Patel, Nitin Singh, Tim Alexander (for "The Climb")	Won	
Visual Effects Society Awards	2014	Outstanding Visual Effects in a Broadcast Program	Steve Kullback, Joe Bauer, Jörn Großhans, Sven Martin (for "Valar Dohaeris")	Won	
Visual Effects Society Awards	2015	Outstanding Performance of an Animated Character in a Commercial, Broadcast Program, or Video Game	Philip Meyer, Thomas Kutschera, Igor Majdandzic, and Mark Spindler (for "Drogon")	Nominated	
Visual Effects Society Awards	2015	Outstanding Visual Effects in a Visual Effects-Driven Photoreal/Live Action Broadcast Program	Game of Thrones (for "The Children")	Won	
Visual Effects Society Awards	2015	Outstanding Created Environment in a Commercial, Broadcast Program, or Video Game	Rene Borst, Christian Zilliken, Jan Burda, Steffen Metzner (for "Braavos Establisher")	Won	
Visual Effects Society Awards	2015	Outstanding Compositing in a Photoreal/Live Action Broadcast Program	Keegan Douglas, Okan Ataman, Brian Fortune, David Lopez (for "Wight Attack")	Nominated	
Visual Effects Society Awards	2015	Outstanding Compositing in a Photoreal/Live Action Broadcast Program	Dan Breckwoldt, Martin Furman, Sophie Marfleet, Eric Andrusyszyn (for "The Watchers on the Wall")	Won	
Visual Effects Society Awards	2016	Outstanding Visual Effects in a Photoreal Episode	Joe Bauer, Steve Kullback, Eric Carney, Derek Spears, Stuart Brisdon (for "The Dance of Dragons")	Won	
Visual Effects Society Awards	2016	Outstanding Animated Performance in an Episode, Commercial, or Real-Time Project	Florian Friedmann, Jonathan Symmonds, Sven Skoczylas, Sebastian Lauer (for "Mother's Mercy" – "Wounded Drogon")	Nominated	
Visual Effects Society Awards	2016	Outstanding Animated Performance in an Episode, Commercial, or Real-Time Project	James Kinnings, Michael Holzl, Joseph Hoback, Matt Derksen (for "The Dance of Dragons" – "Drogon Arena Rescue")	Nominated	
Visual Effects Society Awards	2016	Outstanding Created Environment in an Episode, Commercial, or Real-Time Project	Dominic Piche, Christine Leclerc, Patrice Poissant, Thomas Montminy-Brodeur (for "City of Volantis")	Won	
Visual Effects Society Awards	2016	Outstanding Created Environment in an Episode, Commercial, or Real-Time Project	Rajeev B R., Loganathan Perumal, Ramesh Shankers, Anders Ericson (for "Drogon Arena")	Nominated	
Visual Effects Society Awards	2016	Outstanding Effects Simulations in an Episode, Commercial, or Real-Time Project	David Ramos, Antonio Lado, Piotr Weiss, Félix Bergés (for "Hardhome")	Won	
Visual Effects Society Awards	2016	Outstanding Compositing in a Photoreal Episode	Eduardo Díaz, Guillermo Orbe, Oscar Perea, Inmaculada Nadela (for "Hardhome")	Won	
Visual Effects Society Awards	2016	Outstanding Compositing in a Photoreal Episode	Dan Breckwoldt, Martin Furman, Sophie Marfleet, Eric Andrusyszyn (for "Drogon Arena")	Nominated	
Visual Effects Society Awards	2016	Outstanding Compositing in a Photoreal Episode	Travis Nobles, Mark Spindler, Max Riess, Nadja Ding (for "Drogon Lair")	Nominated	
Visual Effects Society Awards	2017	Outstanding Visual Effects in a Photoreal Episode	Joe Bauer, Steve Kullback, Glenn Melenhorst, Matthew Rouleau, Sam Conway (for "Battle of the Bastards")	Won	
Visual Effects Society Awards	2017	Outstanding Animated Performance in an Episode or Real-Time Project	James Kinnings, Michael Holzl, Matt Derksen, Joseph Hoback (for "Battle of the Bastards" – "Drogon")	Won	
Visual Effects Society Awards	2017	Outstanding Animated Performance in an Episode or Real-Time Project	Sebastian Lauer, Jonathan Symmonds, Thomas Kutschera, Anthony Sieben (for "Home" – "Emaciated Dragon")	Nominated	
Visual Effects Society Awards	2017	Outstanding Created Environment in an Episode, Commercial or Real-Time Project	Deak Ferrand, Dominic Daigle, François Croteau, Alexandru Banuta (for "Battle of the Bastards" – "Meereen City")	Won	
Visual Effects Society Awards	2017	Outstanding Created Environment in an Episode, Commercial or Real-Time Project	Edmond Engelbrecht, Tomoka Matsumura, Edwin Holdsworth, Cheri Fojtik (for "The Winds of Winter" – "Citadel")	Nominated	
Visual Effects Society Awards	2017	Outstanding Virtual Cinematography in a Photoreal Project	Patrick Tiberius Gehlen, Michelle Blok, Christopher Baird, Drew Wood-Davies (for "Battle of the Bastards")	Nominated	
Visual Effects Society Awards	2017	Outstanding Effects Simulations in an Episode, Commercial, or Real-Time Project	Kevin Blom, Sasmit Ranadive, Wanghua Huang, Ben Andersen (for "Battle of the Bastards")	Nominated	
Visual Effects Society Awards	2017	Outstanding Effects Simulations in an Episode, Commercial, or Real-Time Project	Thomas Hullin, Dominik Kirouac, James Dong, Xavier Fourmond (for "Battle of the Bastards" – "Meereen City")	Won	
Visual Effects Society Awards	2017	Outstanding Compositing in a Photoreal Episode	Thomas Montminy-Brodeur, Patrick David, Michael Crane, Joe Salazar (for "Battle of the Bastards" – "Meereen City")	Nominated	
Visual Effects Society Awards	2017	Outstanding Compositing in a Photoreal Episode	Dominic Hellier, Morgan Jones, Thijs Noij, Caleb Thompson (for "Battle of the Bastards" – "Retaking Winterfell")	Won	
Visual Effects Society Awards	2017	Outstanding Compositing in a Photoreal Episode	Eduardo Díaz, Aníbal Del Busto, Angel Rico, Sonsoles López-Aranguren (for "The Door" – "Land of Always Winter")	Nominated	
Visual Effects Society Awards	2018	Outstanding Visual Effects in a Photoreal Episode	Joe Bauer, Steve Kullback, Chris Baird, David Ramos, Sam Conway (for "Beyond the Wall")	Won	
Visual Effects Society Awards	2018	Outstanding Animated Character in an Episode or Real-Time Project	Paul Story, Todd Labonte, Matthew Muntean, Nicholas Wilson (for "Beyond the Wall" – "Zombie Polar Bear")	Nominated	
Visual Effects Society Awards	2018	Outstanding Animated Character in an Episode or Real-Time Project	Jonathan Symmonds, Thomas Kutschera, Philipp Winterstein, Andreas Krieg (for "Eastwatch" – "Drogon Meets Jon")	Nominated	
Visual Effects Society Awards	2018	Outstanding Animated Character in an Episode or Real-Time Project	Murray Stevenson, Jason Snyman, Jenn Taylor, Florian Friedmann (for "The Spoils of War" – "Drogon Loot Train Attack")	Won	
Visual Effects Society Awards	2018	Outstanding Created Environment in an Episode, Commercial or Real-Time Project	Daniel Villalba, Antonio Lado, José Luis Barreiro, Isaac de la Pompa (for "Beyond the Wall" – "Frozen Lake")	Won	
Visual Effects Society Awards	2018	Outstanding Created Environment in an Episode, Commercial or Real-Time Project	Patrice Poissant, Deak Ferrand, Dominic Daigle, Gabriel Morin (for "Eastwatch")	Nominated	
Visual Effects Society Awards	2018	Outstanding Effects Simulations in an Episode, Commercial, or Real-Time Project	Manuel Ramírez, Óscar Márquez, Pablo Hernández, David Gacituaga (for "Beyond the Wall" – "Frozen Lake")	Nominated	
Visual Effects Society Awards	2018	Outstanding Effects Simulations in an Episode, Commercial, or Real-Time Project	Thomas Hullin, Dominik Kirouac, Sylvain Nouveau, Nathan Arbuckle (for "The Dragon and the Wolf" – "Wall Destruction")	Won	
Visual Effects Society Awards	2018	Outstanding Compositing in a Photoreal Episode	Óscar Perea, Santiago Martos, David Esteve, Michael Crane (for "Beyond the Wall" – "Frozen Lake")	Nominated	
Visual Effects Society Awards	2018	Outstanding Compositing in a Photoreal Episode	Thomas Montminy Brodeur, Xavier Fourmond, Reuben Barkataki, Sébastien Raets (for "Eastwatch")	Nominated	
Visual Effects Society Awards	2018	Outstanding Compositing in a Photoreal Episode	Dom Hellier, Thijs Noij, Edwin Holdsworth, Giacomo Matteucci (for "The Spoils of War" – "Loot Train Attack")	Won	
Visual Effects Society Awards	2020	Outstanding Visual Effects in a Photoreal Episode	Joe Bauer, Steve Kullback, Ted Rae, Mohsen Mousavi, Sam Conway (for "The Bells")	Nominated	
Visual Effects Society Awards	2020	Outstanding Created Environment in an Episode, Commercial, or Real-Time Project	Carlos Patrick DeLeon, Alonso Bocanegra Martinez, Marcela Silva, Benjamin Ross (for "The Iron Throne" – Red Keep Plaza)	Won	
Visual Effects Society Awards	2020	Outstanding Effects Simulations in an Episode, Commercial, or Real-Time Project	Marcel Kern, Paul Fuller, Ryo Sakaguchi, Thomas Hartmann (for "The Bells")	Won	
Visual Effects Society Awards	2020	Outstanding Compositing in an Episode	Sean Heuston, Scott Joseph, James Elster, Corinne Teo (for "The Bells")	Nominated	
Visual Effects Society Awards	2020	Outstanding Compositing in an Episode	Mark Richardson, Darren Christie, Nathan Abbott, Owen Longstaff (for "The Long Night; Dragon Ground Battle")	Won	
Visual Effects Society Awards	2020	Outstanding Special (Practical) Effects in a Photoreal or Animated Project	Sam Conway, Terry Palmer, Laurence Harvey, Alastair Vardy (for "The Bells")	Nominated	
Writers Guild of America Awards	2012	Television Drama Series	David Benioff, Bryan Cogman, Jane Espenson, George R. R. Martin, D. B. Weiss	Nominated	
Writers Guild of America Awards	2012	New Series	David Benioff, Bryan Cogman, Jane Espenson, George R. R. Martin, D. B. Weiss	Nominated	
Writers Guild of America Awards	2013	Television Drama Series	David Benioff, Bryan Cogman, George R. R. Martin, Vanessa Taylor, D. B. Weiss	Nominated	
Writers Guild of America Awards	2015	Episodic Drama	George R. R. Martin (for "The Lion and the Rose")	Nominated	
Writers Guild of America Awards	2015	Television Drama Series	David Benioff, Bryan Cogman, George R. R. Martin, D. B. Weiss	Nominated	
Writers Guild of America Awards	2016	Episodic Drama	David Benioff and D. B. Weiss (for "Mother's Mercy")	Nominated	
Writers Guild of America Awards	2016	Television Drama Series	David Benioff, Bryan Cogman, Dave Hill, D. B. Weiss	Nominated	
Writers Guild of America Awards	2017	Episodic Drama	David Benioff and D. B. Weiss (for "The Winds of Winter")	Nominated	
Writers Guild of America Awards	2017	Television Drama Series	David Benioff, Bryan Cogman, Dave Hill, D. B. Weiss	Nominated	
Writers Guild of America Awards	2018	Television Drama Series	David Benioff, Bryan Cogman, Dave Hill, D. B. Weiss	Nominated	

=== Emmy Awards ===
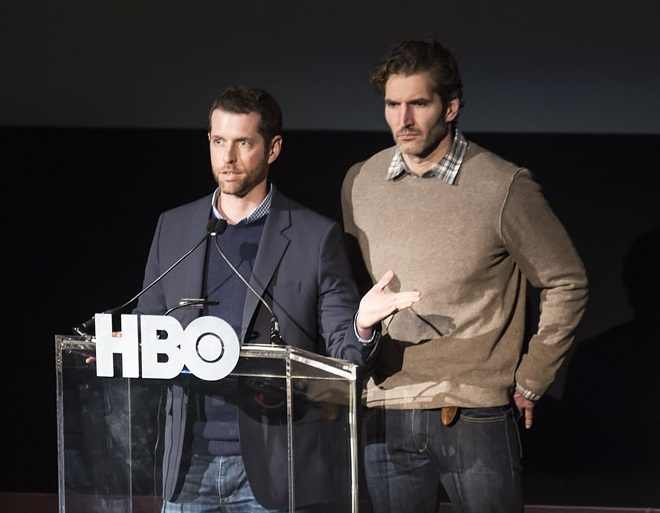
D. B. Weiss and David Benioff received the Primetime Emmy Award for Outstanding Writing for a Drama Series for "Mother's Mercy" in 2015 and for "Battle of the Bastards" in 2016.

The Emmy Awards were established in 1949 in order to recognize excellence in the American television industry, and are bestowed by members of the Academy of Television Arts & Sciences. Emmy Awards are given in different ceremonies presented annually; Primetime Emmy Awards recognize outstanding work in American primetime television programming, while the Creative Arts Emmy Awards are presented to honor technical and creative achievements, and include categories recognizing work of art directors, lighting and costume designers, cinematographers, casting directors, and other production-based personnel. The Emmy Award corresponds to the Academy Award (for film), the Tony Award (for theatre), and the Grammy Award (for music).

Game of Thrones has won 59 out of 164 nominations. Among the 12 cast members nominated for acting Emmys, Peter Dinklage holds the distinction of being the only one nominated for all eight seasons, for Outstanding Supporting Actor in a Drama Series, for playing Tyrion Lannister; Dinklage also holds the distinction of being the only cast member to win an acting Emmy for the series, with wins in 2011, 2015, 2018 and 2019. Showrunners David Benioff and D. B. Weiss have won twice for Writing for a Drama Series. Game of Thrones has eight nominations for Outstanding Drama Series, winning four, in 2015, 2016, 2018 and 2019. Both David Nutter and Miguel Sapochnik have won for Outstanding Directing for a Drama Series. Game of Thrones holds the Emmy Award record for most wins for a scripted television series, ahead of Frasier (which received 37).

At the 67th Primetime Emmy Awards the show's fifth season was nominated for 24 awards. The show ultimately won 12 awards, setting a new record for most Emmy wins by a series in a single year, replacing the previous holder The West Wing's nine wins, and tying that show and Hill Street Blues for the most wins by a drama series throughout its run. At the nominee announcement for the 68th Primetime Emmy Awards, the show's sixth season received the most nominations of any show with 23. The show again won 12 awards, tying the same record for most Emmy wins by a series in a single year.

At the 70th Primetime Emmy Awards the seventh season was nominated for 22 awards, the most of the ceremony, including a first Emmy nomination for Nikolaj Coster-Waldau. At the 71st Primetime Emmy Awards the eighth season was nominated for 32 awards, thus breaking the record for most nominations received by a regular series in a single year. Actors Alfie Allen, Gwendoline Christie, Sophie Turner and Carice van Houten all received their first Emmy Award nomination thanks to this season.

==== Emmy awards and nominations for the cast ====
Emmy awards and nominations for the cast
Actor	Character	Category	Seasons							
Actor	Character	Category	1	2	3	4	5	6	7	8
Peter Dinklage	Tyrion Lannister	Supporting Actor	Won	Nominated	Nominated	Nominated	Won	Nominated	Won	Won
Diana Rigg	Olenna Tyrell	Guest Actress			Nominated	Nominated	Nominated		Nominated	
Emilia Clarke	Daenerys Targaryen	Supporting Actress			Nominated		Nominated	Nominated		
Emilia Clarke	Daenerys Targaryen	Lead Actress								Nominated
Lena Headey	Cersei Lannister	Supporting Actress				Nominated	Nominated	Nominated	Nominated	Nominated
Kit Harington	Jon Snow	Supporting Actor						Nominated		
Kit Harington	Jon Snow	Lead Actor								Nominated
Maisie Williams	Arya Stark	Supporting Actress						Nominated		Nominated
Max von Sydow	Three-eyed Raven	Guest Actor						Nominated		
Nikolaj Coster-Waldau	Jaime Lannister	Supporting Actor							Nominated	Nominated
Alfie Allen	Theon Greyjoy	Supporting Actor								Nominated
Gwendoline Christie	Brienne of Tarth	Supporting Actress								Nominated
Sophie Turner	Sansa Stark	Supporting Actress								Nominated
Carice van Houten	Melisandre	Guest Actress								Nominated

==== Primetime and Creative Arts Emmy Awards ====
Primetime and Creative Arts Emmys awards and nominations
Award	Year	Category	Nominee(s)	Result	Ref(s)
Primetime Emmy Awards	2011	Outstanding Drama Series	Vince Gerardis, Frank Doelger, Ralph Vicinanza, Mark Huffam, David Benioff, Carolyn Strauss, George R. R. Martin, Guymon Casady and D. B. Weiss	Nominated	
Primetime Emmy Awards	2011	Outstanding Supporting Actor in a Drama Series	Peter Dinklage (for "Baelor")	Won	
Primetime Emmy Awards	2011	Outstanding Directing for a Drama Series	Tim Van Patten (for "Winter Is Coming")	Nominated	
Primetime Emmy Awards	2011	Outstanding Writing for a Drama Series	David Benioff and D. B. Weiss (for "Baelor")	Nominated	
Primetime Emmy Awards	2012	Outstanding Drama Series	David Benioff, D. B. Weiss, Frank Doelger, Carolyn Strauss, George R. R. Martin, Vanessa Taylor, Alan Taylor, Guymon Casady, Vince Gerardis and Bernadette Caulfield	Nominated	
Primetime Emmy Awards	2012	Outstanding Supporting Actor in a Drama Series	Peter Dinklage (for "Blackwater")	Nominated	
Primetime Emmy Awards	2013	Outstanding Drama Series	David Benioff, D. B. Weiss, Carolyn Strauss, Frank Doelger, Bernadette Caulfield, Guymon Casady, Vince Gerardis, George R. R. Martin, Vanessa Taylor, Chris Newman and Greg Spence	Nominated	
Primetime Emmy Awards	2013	Outstanding Supporting Actor in a Drama Series	Peter Dinklage (for "Second Sons")	Nominated	
Primetime Emmy Awards	2013	Outstanding Supporting Actress in a Drama Series	Emilia Clarke (for "And Now His Watch Is Ended")	Nominated	
Primetime Emmy Awards	2013	Outstanding Writing for a Drama Series	David Benioff and D. B. Weiss (for "The Rains of Castamere")	Nominated	
Primetime Emmy Awards	2014	Outstanding Drama Series	David Benioff, D. B. Weiss, Carolyn Strauss, Frank Doelger, Bernadette Caulfield, Guymon Casady, Vince Gerardis, George R. R. Martin, Chris Newman and Greg Spence	Nominated	
Primetime Emmy Awards	2014	Outstanding Supporting Actor in a Drama Series	Peter Dinklage (for "The Laws of Gods and Men")	Nominated	
Primetime Emmy Awards	2014	Outstanding Supporting Actress in a Drama Series	Lena Headey (for "The Lion and the Rose")	Nominated	
Primetime Emmy Awards	2014	Outstanding Directing for a Drama Series	Neil Marshall (for "The Watchers on the Wall")	Nominated	
Primetime Emmy Awards	2014	Outstanding Writing for a Drama Series	David Benioff and D. B. Weiss (for "The Children")	Nominated	
Primetime Emmy Awards	2015	Outstanding Drama Series	David Benioff, D. B. Weiss, Carolyn Strauss, Frank Doelger, Bernadette Caulfield, Guymon Casady, Vince Gerardis, George R. R. Martin, Chris Newman, Greg Spence, Lisa McAtackney and Bryan Cogman	Won	
Primetime Emmy Awards	2015	Outstanding Supporting Actor in a Drama Series	Peter Dinklage (for "Hardhome")	Won	
Primetime Emmy Awards	2015	Outstanding Supporting Actress in a Drama Series	Emilia Clarke (for "The Dance of Dragons")	Nominated	
Primetime Emmy Awards	2015	Outstanding Supporting Actress in a Drama Series	Lena Headey (for "Mother's Mercy")	Nominated	
Primetime Emmy Awards	2015	Outstanding Directing for a Drama Series	David Nutter (for "Mother's Mercy")	Won	
Primetime Emmy Awards	2015	Outstanding Directing for a Drama Series	Jeremy Podeswa (for "Unbowed, Unbent, Unbroken")	Nominated	
Primetime Emmy Awards	2015	Outstanding Writing for a Drama Series	David Benioff and D. B. Weiss (for "Mother's Mercy")	Won	
Primetime Emmy Awards	2016	Outstanding Drama Series	David Benioff, D. B. Weiss, Carolyn Strauss, Frank Doelger, Bernadette Caulfield, Vince Gerardis, Guymon Casady, George R. R. Martin, Bryan Cogman, Chris Newman, Greg Spence and Lisa McAtackney	Won	
Primetime Emmy Awards	2016	Outstanding Supporting Actor in a Drama Series	Peter Dinklage (for "No One")	Nominated	
Primetime Emmy Awards	2016	Outstanding Supporting Actor in a Drama Series	Kit Harington (for "Battle of the Bastards")	Nominated	
Primetime Emmy Awards	2016	Outstanding Supporting Actress in a Drama Series	Emilia Clarke (for "Book of the Stranger")	Nominated	
Primetime Emmy Awards	2016	Outstanding Supporting Actress in a Drama Series	Lena Headey (for "The Winds of Winter")	Nominated	
Primetime Emmy Awards	2016	Outstanding Supporting Actress in a Drama Series	Maisie Williams (for "No One")	Nominated	
Primetime Emmy Awards	2016	Outstanding Directing for a Drama Series	Miguel Sapochnik (for "Battle of the Bastards")	Won	
Primetime Emmy Awards	2016	Outstanding Directing for a Drama Series	Jack Bender (for "The Door")	Nominated	
Primetime Emmy Awards	2016	Outstanding Writing for a Drama Series	David Benioff and D. B. Weiss (for "Battle of the Bastards")	Won	
Primetime Emmy Awards	2018	Outstanding Drama Series	David Benioff, D. B. Weiss, Carolyn Strauss, Frank Doelger, Bernadette Caulfield, George R. R. Martin, Guymon Casady, Vince Gerardis, Bryan Cogman, Chris Newman, Lisa McAtackney and Greg Spence	Won	
Primetime Emmy Awards	2018	Outstanding Supporting Actor in a Drama Series	Nikolaj Coster-Waldau (for "The Spoils of War")	Nominated	
Primetime Emmy Awards	2018	Outstanding Supporting Actor in a Drama Series	Peter Dinklage (for "The Dragon and the Wolf")	Won	
Primetime Emmy Awards	2018	Outstanding Supporting Actress in a Drama Series	Lena Headey (for "The Dragon and the Wolf")	Nominated	
Primetime Emmy Awards	2018	Outstanding Directing for a Drama Series	Alan Taylor (for "Beyond the Wall")	Nominated	
Primetime Emmy Awards	2018	Outstanding Directing for a Drama Series	Jeremy Podeswa (for "The Dragon and the Wolf")	Nominated	
Primetime Emmy Awards	2018	Outstanding Writing for a Drama Series	David Benioff and D. B. Weiss (for "The Dragon and the Wolf")	Nominated	
Primetime Emmy Awards	2019	Outstanding Drama Series	David Benioff, D. B. Weiss, Carolyn Strauss, Bernadette Caulfield, Frank Doelger, David Nutter, Miguel Sapochnik, Vince Gerardis, Guymon Casady, George R. R. Martin, Bryan Cogman, Chris Newman, Greg Spence, Lisa McAtackney and Duncan Muggoch	Won	
Primetime Emmy Awards	2019	Outstanding Lead Actor in a Drama Series	Kit Harington (for "The Iron Throne")	Nominated	
Primetime Emmy Awards	2019	Outstanding Lead Actress in a Drama Series	Emilia Clarke (for "The Last of the Starks")	Nominated	
Primetime Emmy Awards	2019	Outstanding Supporting Actor in a Drama Series	Alfie Allen (for "The Long Night")	Nominated	
Primetime Emmy Awards	2019	Outstanding Supporting Actor in a Drama Series	Nikolaj Coster-Waldau (for "A Knight of the Seven Kingdoms")	Nominated	
Primetime Emmy Awards	2019	Outstanding Supporting Actor in a Drama Series	Peter Dinklage (for "The Iron Throne")	Won	
Primetime Emmy Awards	2019	Outstanding Supporting Actress in a Drama Series	Gwendoline Christie (for "A Knight of the Seven Kingdoms")	Nominated	
Primetime Emmy Awards	2019	Outstanding Supporting Actress in a Drama Series	Lena Headey (for "The Bells")	Nominated	
Primetime Emmy Awards	2019	Outstanding Supporting Actress in a Drama Series	Sophie Turner (for "Winterfell")	Nominated	
Primetime Emmy Awards	2019	Outstanding Supporting Actress in a Drama Series	Maisie Williams (for "The Long Night")	Nominated	
Primetime Emmy Awards	2019	Outstanding Directing for a Drama Series	David Benioff and D. B. Weiss (for "The Iron Throne")	Nominated	
Primetime Emmy Awards	2019	Outstanding Directing for a Drama Series	David Nutter (for "The Last of the Starks")	Nominated	
Primetime Emmy Awards	2019	Outstanding Directing for a Drama Series	Miguel Sapochnik (for "The Long Night")	Nominated	
Primetime Emmy Awards	2019	Outstanding Writing for a Drama Series	David Benioff and D. B. Weiss (for "The Iron Throne")	Nominated	
Creative Arts Emmy Awards	2011	Outstanding Casting for a Drama Series	Nina Gold and Robert Sterne	Nominated	
Creative Arts Emmy Awards	2011	Outstanding Costumes for a Series	Michele Clapton and Rachael Webb-Crozier (for "The Pointy End")	Nominated	
Creative Arts Emmy Awards	2011	Outstanding Hairstyling for a Single-Camera Series	Kevin Alexander and Candice Banks (for "A Golden Crown")	Nominated	
Creative Arts Emmy Awards	2011	Outstanding Main Title Design	Angus Wall, Hameed Shaukat, Kirk Shintani, and Robert Feng	Won	
Creative Arts Emmy Awards	2011	Outstanding Makeup for a Single-Camera Series (Non-Prosthetic)	Paul Engelen and Melissa Lackersteen (for "Winter Is Coming")	Nominated	
Creative Arts Emmy Awards	2011	Outstanding Prosthetic Makeup for a Series, Miniseries, Movie or a Special	Paul Engelen and Conor O'Sullivan (for "A Golden Crown")	Nominated	
Creative Arts Emmy Awards	2011	Outstanding Sound Editing for a Series	Robin Quinn, Steve Fanagan, Eoghan McDonnell, Jon Stevenson, Tim Hands, Stefan Henrix, Caoimhe Doyle, Michelle McCormack and Andy Kennedy (for "A Golden Crown")	Nominated	
Creative Arts Emmy Awards	2011	Outstanding Special Visual Effects	Rafael Morant, Adam McInnes, Graham Hills, Lucy Ainsworth-Taylor, Stuart Brisdon, Damien Macé, Henry Badgett and Angela Barson (for "Fire and Blood")	Nominated	
Creative Arts Emmy Awards	2011	Outstanding Stunt Coordination	Paul Jennings (for "The Wolf and the Lion")	Nominated	
Creative Arts Emmy Awards	2012	Outstanding Art Direction for a Single-Camera Series	Gemma Jackson, Frank Walsh, and Tina Jones (for "Garden of Bones", "The Ghost of Harrenhal", and "A Man Without Honor")	Won (Note: Tied with Boardwalk Empire)	
Creative Arts Emmy Awards	2012	Outstanding Casting for a Drama Series	Nina Gold and Robert Sterne	Nominated	
Creative Arts Emmy Awards	2012	Outstanding Costumes for a Series	Michele Clapton, Alexander Fordham, and Chloe Aubry (for "The Prince of Winterfell")	Won	
Creative Arts Emmy Awards	2012	Outstanding Creative Achievement in Interactive Media	Game of Thrones Season Two – Enhanced Digital Experience	Nominated	
Creative Arts Emmy Awards	2012	Outstanding Hairstyling for a Single-Camera Series	Kevin Alexander, Candice Banks, Rosalia Culora, and Gary Machin (for "The Old Gods and the New")	Nominated	
Creative Arts Emmy Awards	2012	Outstanding Makeup for a Single-Camera Series (Non-Prosthetic)	Paul Engelen and Melissa Lackersteen (for "The Old Gods and the New")	Won	
Creative Arts Emmy Awards	2012	Outstanding Prosthetic Makeup for a Series, Miniseries, Movie or a Special	Paul Engelen, Conor O'Sullivan, and Rob Trenton (for "Valar Morghulis")	Nominated	
Creative Arts Emmy Awards	2012	Outstanding Sound Editing for a Series	Peter Brown, Kira Roessler, Tim Hands, Paul Aulicino, Stephen P. Robinson, Vanessa Lapato, Brett Voss, James Moriana, Jeffrey Wilhoit, and David Klotz (for "Blackwater")	Won	
Creative Arts Emmy Awards	2012	Outstanding Sound Mixing for a Comedy or Drama Series (One-Hour)	Matthew Waters, Onnalee Blank, Ronan Hill, and Mervyn Moore (for "Blackwater")	Won	
Creative Arts Emmy Awards	2012	Outstanding Special Visual Effects	Rainer Gombos, Juri Stanossek, Sven Martin, Steve Kullback, Jan Fiedler, Chris Stenner, Tobias Mannewitz, Thilo Ewers, and Adam Chazen (for "Valar Morghulis")	Won	
Creative Arts Emmy Awards	2013	Outstanding Art Direction for a Single-Camera Series	Gemma Jackson, Frank Walsh, and Tina Jones (for "Valar Dohaeris")	Nominated	
Creative Arts Emmy Awards	2013	Outstanding Casting for a Drama Series	Nina Gold and Robert Sterne	Nominated	
Creative Arts Emmy Awards	2013	Outstanding Cinematography for a Single-Camera Series	Rob McLachlan (for "Mhysa")	Nominated	
Creative Arts Emmy Awards	2013	Outstanding Costumes for a Series	Michele Clapton, Alexander Fordham, and Chloe Aubry (for "Walk of Punishment")	Nominated	
Creative Arts Emmy Awards	2013	Outstanding Guest Actress in a Drama Series	Diana Rigg (for "And Now His Watch Is Ended")	Nominated	
Creative Arts Emmy Awards	2013	Outstanding Hairstyling for a Single-Camera Series	Kevin Alexander, Candice Banks, Rosalia Culora, and Gary Machin (for "Second Sons")	Nominated	
Creative Arts Emmy Awards	2013	Outstanding Interactive Program	Game of Thrones Season Three – Enhanced Digital Experience	Nominated	
Creative Arts Emmy Awards	2013	Outstanding Makeup for a Single-Camera Series (Non-Prosthetic)	Paul Engelen and Melissa Lackersteen (for "Kissed by Fire")	Won	
Creative Arts Emmy Awards	2013	Outstanding Prosthetic Makeup for a Series, Miniseries, Movie or a Special	Paul Engelen, Conor O'Sullivan, and Rob Trenton (for "Valar Dohaeris")	Nominated	
Creative Arts Emmy Awards	2013	Outstanding Single-Camera Picture Editing for a Drama Series	Oral Ottey (for "The Rains of Castamere")	Nominated	
Creative Arts Emmy Awards	2013	Outstanding Sound Editing for a Series	Peter Brown, Kira Roessler, Tim Hands, Paul Aulicino, Stephen P. Robinson, Vanessa Lapato, Brett Voss, James Moriana, Jeffrey Wilhoit, and David Klotz (for "And Now His Watch Is Ended")	Nominated	
Creative Arts Emmy Awards	2013	Outstanding Sound Mixing for a Drama Series (One hour)	Matthew Waters, Onnalee Blank, Ronan Hill, and Mervyn Moore (for "And Now His Watch Is Ended")	Nominated	
Creative Arts Emmy Awards	2013	Outstanding Special Visual Effects	Doug Campbell, Rainer Gombos, Juri Stanossek, Sven Martin, Steve Kullback, Jan Fiedler, Chris Stenner, Tobias Mannewitz, Thilo Ewers, and Adam Chazen (for "Valar Dohaeris")	Won	
Creative Arts Emmy Awards	2014	Outstanding Production Design for a Narrative Contemporary or Fantasy Program (One Hour or More)	Deborah Riley, Paul Ghirardani, and Rob Cameron (for "The Laws of Gods and Men", and "The Mountain and the Viper")	Won	
Creative Arts Emmy Awards	2014	Outstanding Casting for a Drama Series	Nina Gold and Robert Sterne	Nominated	
Creative Arts Emmy Awards	2014	Outstanding Cinematography for a Single-Camera Series	Anette Haellmigk (for "The Lion and the Rose")	Nominated	
Creative Arts Emmy Awards	2014	Outstanding Cinematography for a Single-Camera Series	Jonathan Freeman (for "Two Swords")	Nominated	
Creative Arts Emmy Awards	2014	Outstanding Costumes for a Series	Michele Clapton, Sheena Wichary, Alexander Fordham, and Nina Ayres (for "The Lion and the Rose")	Won	
Creative Arts Emmy Awards	2014	Outstanding Guest Actress in a Drama Series	Diana Rigg (for "The Lion and the Rose")	Nominated	
Creative Arts Emmy Awards	2014	Outstanding Hairstyling for a Single-Camera Series	Kevin Alexander, Candice Banks, Rosalia Culora, Gary Machin, and Nicola Mount (for "The Lion and the Rose")	Nominated	
Creative Arts Emmy Awards	2014	Outstanding Interactive Program	Game of Thrones Premiere – Facebook Live and Instagram, by Sabrina Caluori, Paul Beddoe-Stephens, Jim Marsh, Michael McMorrow, and Michael McMillian	Nominated	
Creative Arts Emmy Awards	2014	Outstanding Makeup for a Single-Camera Series (Non-Prosthetic)	Jane Walker and Ann McEwan (for "Oathkeeper")	Nominated	
Creative Arts Emmy Awards	2014	Outstanding Music Composition for a Series (Original Dramatic Score)	Ramin Djawadi (for "The Mountain and the Viper")	Nominated	
Creative Arts Emmy Awards	2014	Outstanding Prosthetic Makeup for a Series, Limited Series, Movie, or Special	Jane Walker and Barrie Gower (for "The Children")	Won	
Creative Arts Emmy Awards	2014	Outstanding Sound Editing for a Series	Tim Kimmel, Jed M. Dodge, Tim Hands, Paula Fairfield, David Klotz, Bradley C. Katona, Brett Voss, Jeffrey Wilhoit, and Dylan T. Wilhoit (for "The Watchers on the Wall")	Nominated	
Creative Arts Emmy Awards	2014	Outstanding Sound Mixing for a Drama Series (One Hour)	Ronan Hill, Richard Dyer, Onnalee Blank, and Mathew Waters (for "The Watchers on the Wall")	Nominated	
Creative Arts Emmy Awards	2014	Outstanding Special Visual Effects	Joe Bauer, Joern Grosshans, Steve Kullback, Adam Chazen, Eric Carney, Sabrina Gerhardt, Matthew Rouleau, Thomas H. Schelesny, and Robert Simon (for "The Children")	Won	
Creative Arts Emmy Awards	2014	Outstanding Stunt Coordination for a Drama Series	Paul Herbert	Nominated	
Creative Arts Emmy Awards	2015	Outstanding Casting for a Drama Series	Nina Gold, Robert Sterne, and Carla Stronge	Won	
Creative Arts Emmy Awards	2015	Outstanding Cinematography for a Single-Camera Series	Fabian Wagner (for "Hardhome")	Nominated	
Creative Arts Emmy Awards	2015	Outstanding Cinematography for a Single-Camera Series	Anette Haellmigk (for "Sons of the Harpy")	Nominated	
Creative Arts Emmy Awards	2015	Outstanding Cinematography for a Single-Camera Series	Robert McLachlan (for "The Dance of Dragons")	Nominated	
Creative Arts Emmy Awards	2015	Outstanding Cinematography for a Single-Camera Series	Gregory Middleton (for "Unbowed, Unbent, Unbroken")	Nominated	
Creative Arts Emmy Awards	2015	Outstanding Costumes for a Period/Fantasy Series, Limited Series or Movie	Michele Clapton, Sheena Wichary, Nina Ayres, Alex Fordham (for "The Dance of Dragons")	Nominated	
Creative Arts Emmy Awards	2015	Outstanding Guest Actress in a Drama Series	Diana Rigg (for "The Gift")	Nominated	
Creative Arts Emmy Awards	2015	Outstanding Hairstyling for a Single-Camera Series	Kevin Alexander, Candice Banks, Rosalia Culora, Gary Machin, Laura Pollock, Nicola Mount (for "Mother's Mercy")	Nominated	
Creative Arts Emmy Awards	2015	Outstanding Makeup for a Single-Camera Series (Non-Prosthetic)	Jane Walker and Nicola Matthews (for "Mother's Mercy")	Won	
Creative Arts Emmy Awards	2015	Outstanding Production Design for a Fantasy Program	Deborah Riley, Paul Ghirardani, Rob Cameron (for "High Sparrow", "Unbowed, Unbent, Unbroken", and "Hardhome")	Won	
Creative Arts Emmy Awards	2015	Outstanding Prosthetic Makeup for a Series	Jane Walker, Barrie Gower, and Sarah Gower (for "Hardhome")	Nominated	
Creative Arts Emmy Awards	2015	Outstanding Single-Camera Picture Editing for a Drama Series	Tim Porter (for "Hardhome")	Nominated	
Creative Arts Emmy Awards	2015	Outstanding Single-Camera Picture Editing for a Drama Series	Katie Weiland (for "The Dance of Dragons")	Won	
Creative Arts Emmy Awards	2015	Outstanding Sound Editing for a Series	Tim Kimmel, Paula Fairfield, Bradley C. Katona, Peter Bercovitch, David Klotz, Jeffrey Wilhoit, Dylan T. Wilhoit (for "Hardhome")	Won	
Creative Arts Emmy Awards	2015	Outstanding Sound Mixing for a Series	Ronan Hill, Richard Dyer, Onnalee Blank, Mathew Waters (for "Hardhome")	Won	
Creative Arts Emmy Awards	2015	Outstanding Special Visual Effects	Steve Kullback, Joe Bauer, Adam Chazen, Jabbar Raisani, Eric Carney, Stuart Brisdon, Derek Spears, James Kinnings, Matthew Rouleau (for "The Dance of Dragons")	Won	
Creative Arts Emmy Awards	2015	Outstanding Stunt Coordination for a Series	Rowley Irlam	Won	
Creative Arts Emmy Awards	2016	Outstanding Casting for a Drama Series	Nina Gold, Robert Sterne, and Carla Stronge	Won	
Creative Arts Emmy Awards	2016	Outstanding Cinematography for a Single-Camera Series	Gregory Middleton (for "Home")	Nominated	
Creative Arts Emmy Awards	2016	Outstanding Costumes for a Fantasy Series	Michele Clapton, Chloe Aubry, Sheena Wichary (for "The Winds of Winter")	Won	
Creative Arts Emmy Awards	2016	Outstanding Guest Actor in a Drama Series	Max von Sydow (for "The Door")	Nominated	
Creative Arts Emmy Awards	2016	Outstanding Hairstyling for a Single-Camera Series	Kevin Alexander, Candice Banks, Nicola Mount, Laura Pollock, Gary Machin, Rosalia Culora (for "The Door")	Nominated	
Creative Arts Emmy Awards	2016	Outstanding Interactive Program	Game of Thrones Main Titles 360 Experience	Nominated	
Creative Arts Emmy Awards	2016	Outstanding Makeup for a Single-Camera Series (Non-Prosthetic)	Jane Walker, Kate Thompson, Nicola Mathews, Kay Bilk, Marianna Kyriacou, Pamela Smyth (for "Battle of the Bastards")	Won	
Creative Arts Emmy Awards	2016	Outstanding Production Design for a Fantasy Program	Deborah Riley, Paul Ghirardani, Rob Cameron (for "Blood of My Blood", "The Broken Man", and "No One")	Won	
Creative Arts Emmy Awards	2016	Outstanding Prosthetic Makeup for a Series	Jane Walker, Sarah Gower, Emma Sheffield, Tristan Versluis, Barrie Gower (for "The Door")	Won	
Creative Arts Emmy Awards	2016	Outstanding Single-Camera Picture Editing for a Drama Series	Tim Porter (for "Battle of the Bastards")	Won	
Creative Arts Emmy Awards	2016	Outstanding Single-Camera Picture Editing for a Drama Series	Katie Weiland (for "Oathbreaker")	Nominated	
Creative Arts Emmy Awards	2016	Outstanding Sound Editing for a Series	Tim Kimmel, Tim Hands, Paul Bercovitch, Paula Fairfield, Bradley C. Katona, Michael Wabro, David Klotz, Brett Voss, Jeffrey Wilhoit, Dylan Tuomy-Wilhoit (for "The Door")	Nominated	
Creative Arts Emmy Awards	2016	Outstanding Sound Mixing for a Series	Ronan Hill, Richard Dyer, Onnalee Blank, Mathew Waters (for "Battle of the Bastards")	Won	
Creative Arts Emmy Awards	2016	Outstanding Special Visual Effects	Steve Kullback, Joe Bauer, Adam Chazen, Derek Spears, Eric Carney, Sam Conway, Matthew Rouleau, Michelle Blok, Glenn Melenhorst (for "Battle of the Bastards")	Won	
Creative Arts Emmy Awards	2016	Outstanding Stunt Coordination for a Series	Rowley Irlam	Won	
Creative Arts Emmy Awards	2018	Outstanding Casting for a Drama Series	Nina Gold, Robert Sterne, and Carla Stronge	Nominated	
Creative Arts Emmy Awards	2018	Outstanding Fantasy/Sci-Fi Costumes	Michele Clapton, Alexander Fordham, Emma O'Loughlin, and Kate O'Farrell (for "Beyond the Wall")	Won	
Creative Arts Emmy Awards	2018	Outstanding Guest Actress in a Drama Series	Diana Rigg (for "The Queen's Justice")	Nominated	
Creative Arts Emmy Awards	2018	Outstanding Hairstyling for a Single-Camera Series	Kevin Alexander, Candice Banks, Nicola Mount, and Rosalia Culora (for "The Dragon and the Wolf")	Nominated	
Creative Arts Emmy Awards	2018	Outstanding Makeup for a Single-Camera Series (Non-Prosthetic)	Jane Walker, Kay Bilk, Marianna Kyriacou, Pamela Smyth, Kate Thompson, and Nicola Mathews (for "The Dragon and the Wolf")	Nominated	
Creative Arts Emmy Awards	2018	Outstanding Music Composition for a Series (Original Dramatic Score)	Ramin Djawadi (for "The Dragon and the Wolf")	Won	
Creative Arts Emmy Awards	2018	Outstanding Production Design for a Narrative Period or Fantasy Program (One Hour or More)	Deborah Riley, Paul Ghirardani, and Rob Cameron (for "Dragonstone")	Won	
Creative Arts Emmy Awards	2018	Outstanding Prosthetic Makeup for a Series, Miniseries, Movie or a Special	Jane Walker, Paul Spateri, Emma Sheffield, and Barrie Gower (for "Beyond the Wall")	Won	
Creative Arts Emmy Awards	2018	Outstanding Single-Camera Picture Editing for a Drama Series	Tim Porter (for "Beyond the Wall")	Nominated	
Creative Arts Emmy Awards	2018	Outstanding Single-Camera Picture Editing for a Drama Series	Crispin Green (for "The Spoils of War")	Nominated	
Creative Arts Emmy Awards	2018	Outstanding Single-Camera Picture Editing for a Drama Series	Katie Weiland (for "The Dragon and the Wolf")	Nominated	
Creative Arts Emmy Awards	2018	Outstanding Sound Editing for a Comedy or Drama Series (One Hour)	Tim Kimmel, Paula Fairfield, Tim Hands, Paul Bercovitch, Bradley C. Katona, John Matter, Brett Voss, David Klotz, Jeffrey Wilhoit, and Dylan T. Wilhoit (for "The Spoils of War")	Nominated	
Creative Arts Emmy Awards	2018	Outstanding Sound Mixing for a Comedy or Drama Series (One Hour)	Onnalee Blank, Mathew Waters, Richard Dyer, and Ronan Hill (for "Beyond the Wall")	Won	
Creative Arts Emmy Awards	2018	Outstanding Special Visual Effects	Steve Kullback, Joe Bauer, Adam Chazen, Michelle Blok, Sam Conway, Ted Rae, David Ramos, Wayne Stables, and Derek Spears (for "Beyond the Wall")	Won	
Creative Arts Emmy Awards	2018	Outstanding Stunt Coordination for a Drama Series, Limited Series or Movie	Rowley Irlam	Won	
Creative Arts Emmy Awards	2019	Outstanding Casting for a Drama Series	Nina Gold, Robert Sterne, and Carla Stronge	Won	
Creative Arts Emmy Awards	2019	Outstanding Cinematography for a Single-Camera Series	Jonathan Freeman (for "The Iron Throne")	Nominated	
Creative Arts Emmy Awards	2019	Outstanding Creative Achievement in Interactive Media within a Scripted Program	"Fight for the Living: Beyond the Wall Virtual Reality Experience"	Nominated	
Creative Arts Emmy Awards	2019	Outstanding Fantasy/Sci-Fi Costumes	Michele Clapton, Emma O'Loughlin, and Kate O'Farrell (for "The Bells")	Won	
Creative Arts Emmy Awards	2019	Outstanding Guest Actress in a Drama Series	Carice van Houten (for "The Long Night")	Nominated	
Creative Arts Emmy Awards	2019	Outstanding Hairstyling for a Single-Camera Series	Kevin Alexander, Candice Banks, Nicola Mount, and Rosalia Culora (for "The Long Night")	Nominated	
Creative Arts Emmy Awards	2019	Outstanding Main Title Design	Angus Wall, Kirk Shintani, Shahana Khan, Ian Ruhfass, and Rustam Hasanov	Won	
Creative Arts Emmy Awards	2019	Outstanding Makeup for a Single-Camera Series (Non-Prosthetic)	Jane Walker, Kay Bilk, Marianna Kyriacou, Nicola Mathews, and Pamela Smyth (for "The Long Night")	Won	
Creative Arts Emmy Awards	2019	Outstanding Music Composition for a Series (Original Dramatic Score)	Ramin Djawadi (for "The Long Night")	Won	
Creative Arts Emmy Awards	2019	Outstanding Production Design for a Narrative Period or Fantasy Program (One Hour or More)	Deborah Riley, Paul Ghirardani, and Rob Cameron (for "The Bells")	Nominated	
Creative Arts Emmy Awards	2019	Outstanding Prosthetic Makeup for a Series, Limited Series, Movie or Special	Emma Faulkes, Paul Spateri, Chloe Muton-Phillips, Duncan Jarman, Patt Foad, John Eldred-Tooby, Barrie Gower, and Sarah Gower (for "The Long Night")	Nominated	
Creative Arts Emmy Awards	2019	Outstanding Single-Camera Picture Editing for a Drama Series	Katie Weiland (for "The Iron Throne")	Nominated	
Creative Arts Emmy Awards	2019	Outstanding Single-Camera Picture Editing for a Drama Series	Tim Porter (for "The Long Night")	Won	
Creative Arts Emmy Awards	2019	Outstanding Single-Camera Picture Editing for a Drama Series	Crispin Green (for "Winterfell")	Nominated	
Creative Arts Emmy Awards	2019	Outstanding Sound Editing for a Comedy or Drama Series (One Hour)	Tim Kimmel, Tim Hands, Paula Fairfield, Bradley C. Katona, Paul Bercovitch, John Matter, David Klotz, Brett Voss, Jeffrey Wilhoit, and Dylan T. Wilhoit (for "The Long Night")	Won	
Creative Arts Emmy Awards	2019	Outstanding Sound Mixing for a Comedy or Drama Series (One Hour)	Onnalee Blank, Mathew Waters, Simon Kerr, Danny Crowley, and Ronan Hill (for "The Long Night")	Won	
Creative Arts Emmy Awards	2019	Outstanding Special Visual Effects	Joe Bauer, Steve Kullback, Adam Chazen, Sam Conway, Mohsen Mousavi, Martin Hill, Ted Rae, Patrick Tiberius Gehlen, and Thomas Schelesny (for "The Bells")	Won	
Creative Arts Emmy Awards	2019	Outstanding Stunt Coordination for a Drama Series, Limited Series or Movie	Rowley Irlam	Won	

== Significant critical awards ==
Significant critical awards and nominations
Award	Year	Category	Nominee(s)	Result	Ref(s)
Critics' Choice Television Awards	2011	Best Drama Series	Game of Thrones	Nominated	
Critics' Choice Television Awards	2012	Best Drama Series	Game of Thrones	Nominated	
Critics' Choice Television Awards	2012	Best Supporting Actor in a Drama Series	Peter Dinklage	Nominated	
Critics' Choice Television Awards	2013	Best Drama Series	Game of Thrones	Won	
Critics' Choice Television Awards	2013	Best Supporting Actor in a Drama Series	Nikolaj Coster-Waldau	Nominated	
Critics' Choice Television Awards	2013	Best Supporting Actress in a Drama Series	Emilia Clarke	Nominated	
Critics' Choice Television Awards	2013	Best Guest Performer in a Drama Series	Diana Rigg	Nominated	
Critics' Choice Television Awards	2014	Best Drama Series	Game of Thrones	Nominated	
Critics' Choice Television Awards	2014	Best Guest Performer in a Drama Series	Diana Rigg	Nominated	
Critics' Choice Television Awards	2015	Best Drama Series	Game of Thrones	Nominated	
Critics' Choice Television Awards	2015	Most Bingeworthy Show	Game of Thrones	Nominated	
Critics' Choice Television Awards	2016	Best Drama Series	Game of Thrones	Won	
Critics' Choice Television Awards	2016	Most Bingeworthy Show	Game of Thrones	Nominated	
Critics' Choice Television Awards	2016	Best Supporting Actor in a Drama Series	Peter Dinklage	Nominated	
Critics' Choice Television Awards	2016	Best Supporting Actor in a Drama Series	Kit Harington	Nominated	
Critics' Choice Television Awards	2016	Best Supporting Actress in a Drama Series	Emilia Clarke	Nominated	
Critics' Choice Television Awards	2016	Best Supporting Actress in a Drama Series	Lena Headey	Nominated	
Critics' Choice Television Awards	2018	Best Drama Series	Game of Thrones	Nominated	
Critics' Choice Television Awards	2018	Best Supporting Actor in a Drama Series	Peter Dinklage	Nominated	
Critics' Choice Television Awards	2018	Best Supporting Actress in a Drama Series	Emilia Clarke	Nominated	
Critics' Choice Television Awards	2020	Best Drama Series	Game of Thrones	Nominated	
Critics' Choice Television Awards	2020	Best Actor in a Drama Series	Kit Harington	Nominated	
Critics' Choice Television Awards	2020	Best Supporting Actor in a Drama Series	Peter Dinklage	Nominated	
Critics' Choice Television Awards	2020	Best Supporting Actress in a Drama Series	Gwendoline Christie	Nominated	
Golden Globe Awards	2012	Best Television Series – Drama	Game of Thrones	Nominated	
Golden Globe Awards	2012	Best Supporting Actor – Series, Miniseries or Television Film	Peter Dinklage	Won	
Golden Globe Awards	2015	Best Television Series – Drama	Game of Thrones	Nominated	
Golden Globe Awards	2016	Best Television Series – Drama	Game of Thrones	Nominated	
Golden Globe Awards	2017	Best Television Series – Drama	Game of Thrones	Nominated	
Golden Globe Awards	2017	Best Supporting Actress – Series, Miniseries or Television Film	Lena Headey	Nominated	
Golden Globe Awards	2018	Best Television Series – Drama	Game of Thrones	Nominated	
Golden Globe Awards	2020	Best Actor – Television Series Drama	Kit Harington	Nominated	
Hugo Awards	2012	Best Dramatic Presentation, Long Form	David Benioff, D. B. Weiss, Bryan Cogman, Jane Espenson, George R. R. Martin, Tim Van Patten, Brian Kirk, Daniel Minahan, and Alan Taylor for Game of Thrones – Season 1	Won	
Hugo Awards	2013	Best Dramatic Presentation, Short Form	Neil Marshall (director) and George R. R. Martin (writer) (for "Blackwater")	Won	
Hugo Awards	2014	Best Dramatic Presentation, Short Form	David Benioff (writer), D. B. Weiss (writer), and David Nutter (director) (for "The Rains of Castamere")	Won	
Hugo Awards	2015	Best Dramatic Presentation, Short Form	David Benioff (writer), D. B. Weiss (writer), and Alex Graves (director) (for "The Mountain and the Viper")	Nominated	
Hugo Awards	2017	Best Dramatic Presentation, Short Form	David Benioff (writer), D. B. Weiss (writer), and Miguel Sapochnik (director) (for "Battle of the Bastards")	Nominated	
Hugo Awards	2017	Best Dramatic Presentation, Short Form	David Benioff (writer), D. B. Weiss (writer), and Jack Bender (director) (for "The Door")	Nominated	
IGN Awards	2011	Best TV Series	Game of Thrones	Nominated	
IGN Awards	2011	Best TV Drama Series	Game of Thrones	Nominated	
IGN Awards	2011	Best TV Actor	Peter Dinklage	Nominated	
IGN Awards	2011	Best TV Actress	Emilia Clarke	Nominated	
IGN Awards	2011	Best TV Episode	"Baelor"	Won	
IGN Awards	2011	Best TV Twist	"Off with his head!"	Won	
IGN Awards	2011	Best TV Hero	Sean Bean as Ned Stark	Won	
IGN Awards	2011	Best TV Hero	Kit Harington as Jon Snow	Nominated	
IGN Awards	2011	Best TV Villain	Jack Gleeson as Joffrey Baratheon	Nominated	
IGN Awards	2012	Best TV Series	Game of Thrones	Nominated	
IGN Awards	2012	Best TV Drama Series	Game of Thrones	Nominated	
IGN Awards	2012	Best TV Episode	"Blackwater"	Won	
IGN Awards	2012	Best TV Villain	Jack Gleeson as Joffrey Baratheon	Nominated	
IGN Awards	2012	Best TV DVD or Blu-ray	The complete first season on Blu-ray	Won	
IGN Awards	2013	Best TV Series	Game of Thrones	Nominated	
IGN Awards	2013	Best TV Drama Series	Game of Thrones	Nominated	
IGN Awards	2013	Best TV Episode	"The Rains of Castamere"	Nominated	
IGN Awards	2013	Best TV Villain	David Bradley as Walder Frey	Nominated	
IGN Awards	2013	Best TV Villain	Jack Gleeson as Joffrey Baratheon	Nominated	
IGN Awards	2013	Best TV DVD or Blu-ray	The complete second season on Blu-ray	Nominated	
IGN Awards	2014	Best TV Series	Game of Thrones	Nominated	
IGN Awards	2014	Best TV Drama Series	Game of Thrones	Won	
IGN Awards	2014	Best TV Episode	"The Children"	Nominated	
IGN Awards	2015	Best TV Series	Game of Thrones	Nominated	
IGN Awards	2015	Best TV Drama Series	Game of Thrones	Nominated	
IGN Awards	2015	Best TV Episode	"Hardhome"	Won	
IGN Awards	2015	Best TV Villain	Iwan Rheon as Ramsay Bolton	Nominated	
IGN Awards	2016	Best TV Series	Game of Thrones	Nominated	
IGN Awards	2016	Best TV Drama Series	Game of Thrones	Nominated	
IGN Awards	2016	Best TV Episode	"The Winds of Winter"	Nominated	
IGN Awards	2017	Best Action Series	Game of Thrones	Won	
IGN Awards	2017	Best TV Episode	"The Spoils of War"	Won	
IGN People's Choice Awards	2011	Best TV Series	Game of Thrones	Won	
IGN People's Choice Awards	2011	Best TV Drama Series	Game of Thrones	Won	
IGN People's Choice Awards	2011	Best TV Actor	Peter Dinklage	Nominated	
IGN People's Choice Awards	2011	Best TV Actress	Emilia Clarke	Nominated	
IGN People's Choice Awards	2011	Best TV Episode	"Baelor"	Nominated	
IGN People's Choice Awards	2011	Best TV Twist	"Off with his head!"	Won	
IGN People's Choice Awards	2011	Best TV Hero	Sean Bean as Ned Stark	Won	
IGN People's Choice Awards	2011	Best TV Hero	Kit Harington as Jon Snow	Nominated	
IGN People's Choice Awards	2011	Best TV Villain	Jack Gleeson as Joffrey Baratheon	Nominated	
IGN People's Choice Awards	2012	Best TV Series	Game of Thrones	Won	
IGN People's Choice Awards	2012	Best TV Drama Series	Game of Thrones	Won	
IGN People's Choice Awards	2012	Best TV Episode	"Blackwater"	Won	
IGN People's Choice Awards	2012	Best TV Villain	Jack Gleeson as Joffrey Baratheon	Won	
IGN People's Choice Awards	2012	Best TV DVD or Blu-ray	The complete first season on Blu-ray	Won	
IGN People's Choice Awards	2013	Best TV Series	Game of Thrones	Nominated	
IGN People's Choice Awards	2013	Best TV Drama Series	Game of Thrones	Nominated	
IGN People's Choice Awards	2013	Best TV Episode	"The Rains of Castamere"	Nominated	
IGN People's Choice Awards	2013	Best TV Villain	David Bradley as Walder Frey	Nominated	
IGN People's Choice Awards	2013	Best TV Villain	Jack Gleeson as Joffrey Baratheon	Won	
IGN People's Choice Awards	2013	Best TV DVD or Blu-ray	The complete second season on Blu-ray	Nominated	
IGN People's Choice Awards	2014	Best TV Series	Game of Thrones	Nominated	
IGN People's Choice Awards	2014	Best TV Drama Series	Game of Thrones	Won	
IGN People's Choice Awards	2014	Best TV Episode	"The Children"	Nominated	
IGN People's Choice Awards	2015	Best TV Series	Game of Thrones	Nominated	
IGN People's Choice Awards	2015	Best TV Drama Series	Game of Thrones	Nominated	
IGN People's Choice Awards	2015	Best TV Episode	"Hardhome"	Nominated	
IGN People's Choice Awards	2015	Best TV Villain	Iwan Rheon as Ramsay Bolton	Nominated	
IGN People's Choice Awards	2016	Best TV Series	Game of Thrones	Won	
IGN People's Choice Awards	2016	Best TV Drama Series	Game of Thrones	Won	
IGN People's Choice Awards	2016	Best TV Episode	"The Winds of Winter"	Won	
IGN People's Choice Awards	2017	Best Action Series	Game of Thrones	Won (Note: Tied with Stranger Things)	
IGN People's Choice Awards	2017	Best TV Episode	"The Spoils of War"	Won	
National Television Awards	2015	Multichannel show	Game of Thrones	Nominated	
National Television Awards	2016	Best International Show	Game of Thrones	Nominated	
National Television Awards	2017	Best Drama	Game of Thrones	Nominated	
National Television Awards	2018	Best Drama	Game of Thrones	Nominated	
People's Choice Awards	2012	Favorite Cable TV Drama	Game of Thrones	Nominated	
People's Choice Awards	2013	Favorite Thriller Show	Game of Thrones	Nominated	
People's Choice Awards	2014	Favorite Premium Cable TV Show	Game of Thrones	Nominated	
People's Choice Awards	2014	Favorite TV Anti-Hero	Nikolaj Coster-Waldau as Jaime Lannister	Nominated	
People's Choice Awards	2014	Favorite Sci-Fi/Fantasy TV Actress	Emilia Clarke	Nominated	
People's Choice Awards	2015	Favorite TV Show	Game of Thrones	Nominated	
People's Choice Awards	2015	Favorite Cable Sci-Fi/Fantasy TV Show	Game of Thrones	Nominated	
People's Choice Awards	2016	Favorite TV Show	Game of Thrones	Nominated	
People's Choice Awards	2016	Favorite Cable Sci-Fi/Fantasy TV Show	Game of Thrones	Nominated	
People's Choice Awards	2016	Favorite Cable Sci-Fi/Fantasy TV Actress	Emilia Clarke	Nominated	
People's Choice Awards	2017	Favorite Premium Sci-Fi/Fantasy TV Show	Game of Thrones	Nominated	
People's Choice Awards	2017	Favorite Sci-Fi/Fantasy TV Actress	Emilia Clarke	Nominated	
People's Choice Awards	2019	The Drama Show of 2019	Game of Thrones	Nominated	
People's Choice Awards	2019	The Bingeworthy Show of 2019	Game of Thrones	Nominated	
People's Choice Awards	2019	The Male TV Star of 2019	Kit Harington	Nominated	
People's Choice Awards	2019	The Female TV Star of 2019	Sophie Turner and Maisie Williams	Nominated	
People's Choice Awards	2019	The Drama TV Star of 2019	Sophie Turner and Maisie Williams	Nominated	
Peabody Awards	2011	Peabody Award	Game of Thrones	Won	
Poppy Awards	2011	Best Supporting Actress, Drama	Emilia Clarke	Won	
Poppy Awards	2011	Best Actor, Drama	Sean Bean	Nominated	
Poppy Awards	2012	Best Supporting Actress, Drama	Lena Headey	Won	
Poppy Awards	2013	Best Supporting Actress, Drama	Natalie Dormer	Won	
Poppy Awards	2014	Best Supporting Actress, Drama	Maisie Williams	Won	
Poppy Awards	2014	Best Supporting Actor, Drama	Charles Dance	Nominated	
Poppy Awards	2014	Best Guest Actor, Drama	Pedro Pascal	Won	
Poppy Awards	2015	Best Supporting Actress, Drama	Maisie Williams	Nominated	
Poppy Awards	2015	Best Supporting Actress, Drama	Sophie Turner	Nominated	
Poppy Awards	2016	Best Supporting Actress, Drama	Sophie Turner	Won	
Satellite Awards	2011	Best Television Series – Genre	Game of Thrones	Nominated	
Satellite Awards	2011	Best Supporting Actor – Series, Miniseries, or Television Film	Peter Dinklage	Won	
Satellite Awards	2012	Best Drama Series	Game of Thrones	Nominated	
Satellite Awards	2012	Best Supporting Actor – Series, Miniseries, or Television Film	Peter Dinklage	Nominated	
Satellite Awards	2013	Best Television Series – Genre	Game of Thrones	Won	
Satellite Awards	2013	Best Supporting Actor – Series, Miniseries, or Television Film	Nikolaj Coster-Waldau	Nominated	
Satellite Awards	2013	Best Supporting Actress – Series, Miniseries, or Television Film	Emilia Clarke	Nominated	
Satellite Awards	2014	Best Television Series – Genre	Game of Thrones	Nominated	
Satellite Awards	2014	Best Supporting Actor – Series, Miniseries, or Television Film	Peter Dinklage	Nominated	
Satellite Awards	2015	Best Television Series – Genre	Game of Thrones	Nominated	
Satellite Awards	2015	Best Supporting Actor – Series, Miniseries, or Television Film	Peter Dinklage	Nominated	
Satellite Awards	2016	Best Television Series – Genre	Game of Thrones	Nominated	
Satellite Awards	2016	Best Supporting Actress – Series, Miniseries, or Television Film	Lena Headey	Nominated	
Satellite Awards	2017	Best Television Series – Genre	Game of Thrones	Won	
Saturn Awards	2012	Best Television Presentation	Game of Thrones	Nominated	
Saturn Awards	2012	Best Actor on Television	Sean Bean	Nominated	
Saturn Awards	2012	Best Actress on Television	Lena Headey	Nominated	
Saturn Awards	2012	Best Supporting Actor on Television	Kit Harington	Nominated	
Saturn Awards	2013	Best Television Presentation	Game of Thrones	Nominated	
Saturn Awards	2014	Best Television Presentation	Game of Thrones	Nominated	
Saturn Awards	2014	Best Supporting Actor on Television	Nikolaj Coster-Waldau	Nominated	
Saturn Awards	2014	Best Supporting Actress on Television	Gwendoline Christie	Nominated	
Saturn Awards	2014	Best Supporting Actress on Television	Michelle Fairley	Nominated	
Saturn Awards	2014	Best Performance by a Younger Actor on Television	Jack Gleeson	Nominated	
Saturn Awards	2015	Best Limited Run Television Series	Game of Thrones	Won	
Saturn Awards	2015	Best Supporting Actress on Television	Emilia Clarke	Nominated	
Saturn Awards	2015	Best Performance by a Younger Actor on Television	Maisie Williams	Won	
Saturn Awards	2016	Best Fantasy Television Series	Game of Thrones	Nominated	
Saturn Awards	2016	Best Supporting Actor on Television	Kit Harington	Nominated	
Saturn Awards	2016	Best Supporting Actress on Television	Lena Headey	Nominated	
Saturn Awards	2016	Best Performance by a Younger Actor in a Television Series	Maisie Williams	Nominated	
Saturn Awards	2016	Best Performance by a Younger Actor in a Television Series	Brenock O'Connor	Nominated	
Saturn Awards	2017	Best Fantasy Television Series	Game of Thrones	Nominated	
Saturn Awards	2017	Best Actress on Television	Lena Headey	Nominated	
Saturn Awards	2017	Best Supporting Actor on Television	Kit Harington	Nominated	
Saturn Awards	2018	Best Fantasy Television Series	Game of Thrones	Nominated	
Saturn Awards	2018	Best Actress on a Television Series	Lena Headey	Nominated	
Saturn Awards	2018	Best Supporting Actor on a Television Series	Kit Harington	Nominated	
Saturn Awards	2018	Best Supporting Actor on a Television Series	Nikolaj Coster-Waldau	Nominated	
Saturn Awards	2019	Best Fantasy Television Series	Game of Thrones	Won	
Saturn Awards	2019	Best Actor on a Television Series	Kit Harington	Nominated	
Saturn Awards	2019	Best Actress on a Television Series	Emilia Clarke	Won	
Saturn Awards	2019	Best Supporting Actor on a Television Series	Nikolaj Coster-Waldau	Nominated	
Saturn Awards	2019	Best Supporting Actor on a Television Series	Peter Dinklage	Won	
Saturn Awards	2019	Best Supporting Actress on a Television Series	Gwendoline Christie	Nominated	
Saturn Awards	2019	Best Supporting Actress on a Television Series	Lena Headey	Nominated	
Saturn Awards	2019	Best Supporting Actress on a Television Series	Sophie Turner	Nominated	
Saturn Awards	2019	Best Performance by a Younger Actor on a Television Series	Maisie Williams	Won	
Scream Awards	2011	Best TV Show	Game of Thrones	Won	
Scream Awards	2011	Best Fantasy Actor	Sean Bean	Nominated	
Scream Awards	2011	Best Fantasy Actress	Lena Headey	Nominated	
Scream Awards	2011	Best Supporting Actor	Peter Dinklage	Won	
Scream Awards	2011	Breakout Performance – Female	Emilia Clarke	Won	
Scream Awards	2011	Best Ensemble	Amrita Acharia, Mark Addy, Alfie Allen, Josef Altin, Sean Bean, Susan Brown, Emilia Clarke, Nikolaj Coster-Waldau, Peter Dinklage, Ron Donachie, Michelle Fairley, Jerome Flynn, Elyes Gabel, Aidan Gillen, Jack Gleeson, Iain Glen, Julian Glover, Kit Harington, Lena Headey, Isaac Hempstead Wright, Conleth Hill, Richard Madden, Jason Momoa, Rory McCann, Ian McElhinney, Luke McEwan, Roxanne McKee, Dar Salim, Mark Stanley, Donald Sumpter, Sophie Turner and Maisie Williams	Nominated	
Scream Awards	2011	Most Memorable Mutilation	"Head covered in molten gold" (from "A Golden Crown")	Nominated	
Scream Awards	2011	The Ultimate Scream	Game of Thrones	Nominated	
TCA Awards	2011	Program of the Year	Game of Thrones	Nominated	
TCA Awards	2011	Outstanding Achievement in Drama	Game of Thrones	Nominated	
TCA Awards	2011	Outstanding New Program	Game of Thrones	Won	
TCA Awards	2011	Individual Achievement in Drama	Peter Dinklage	Nominated	
TCA Awards	2012	Program of the Year	Game of Thrones	Won	
TCA Awards	2012	Outstanding Achievement in Drama	Game of Thrones	Nominated	
TCA Awards	2012	Individual Achievement in Drama	Peter Dinklage	Nominated	
TCA Awards	2013	Program of the Year	Game of Thrones	Nominated	
TCA Awards	2013	Outstanding Achievement in Drama	Game of Thrones	Won	
TCA Awards	2014	Program of the Year	Game of Thrones	Nominated	
TCA Awards	2014	Outstanding Achievement in Drama	Game of Thrones	Nominated	
TCA Awards	2015	Program of the Year	Game of Thrones	Nominated	
TCA Awards	2015	Outstanding Achievement in Drama	Game of Thrones	Nominated	
TCA Awards	2016	Program of the Year	Game of Thrones	Nominated	
TCA Awards	2016	Outstanding Achievement in Drama	Game of Thrones	Nominated	
TCA Awards	2019	Program of the Year	Game of Thrones	Nominated	

== Other awards ==
Other awards and nominations
Award	Year	Category	Nominee(s)	Result	Ref(s)
Asian Academy Creative Awards	2018	Best Visual or Special FX in a TV Series	Method Studios (for "The Spoils of War")	Won	
Dorian Awards	2013	TV Drama of the Year	Game of Thrones	Nominated	
Dorian Awards	2017	TV Drama of the Year	Game of Thrones	Nominated	
Dragon Awards	2016	Best Science Fiction or Fantasy TV Series	Game of Thrones	Won	
Empire Awards	2015	Hero Award	Josef Altin, Jacob Anderson, John Bradley, Thomas Brodie-Sangster, Dominic Carter, Dean-Charles Chapman, Gwendoline Christie, Emilia Clarke, Nikolaj Coster-Waldau, Ben Crompton, Liam Cunningham, Charles Dance, Peter Dinklage, Natalie Dormer, Nathalie Emmanuel, Iain Glen, Julian Glover, Kit Harington, Lena Headey, Isaac Hempstead-Wright, Conleth Hill, Rory McCann, Ian McElhinney, Pedro Pascal, Daniel Portman, Mark Stanley, Sophie Turner, Indira Varma and Maisie Williams	Won	
Empire Awards	2016	Best TV Series	Game of Thrones	Nominated	
Empire Awards	2017	Best TV Series	Game of Thrones	Nominated	
E! Online Best. Ever. TV. Awards	2015	Outstanding Drama Series	Game of Thrones	Nominated	
GLAAD Media Awards	2015	Outstanding Drama Series	Game of Thrones	Nominated	
Glamour Awards	2016	Best UK TV Actress	Sophie Turner	Won	
Golden Nymph Awards	2012	Outstanding International Producer	David Benioff, Frank Doelger, Carolyn Strauss and D. B. Weiss	Won	
Golden Nymph Awards	2012	Outstanding Actress in a Drama Series	Emilia Clarke	Nominated	
Golden Nymph Awards	2012	Outstanding Actress in a Drama Series	Lena Headey	Nominated	
Golden Nymph Awards	2012	Outstanding Actor in a Drama Series	Peter Dinklage	Nominated	
Golden Nymph Awards	2012	Outstanding Actor in a Drama Series	Kit Harington	Nominated	
Golden Trailer Awards	2015	Best Teaser/Trailer for a TV Series or Mini-series	"Justice" (MOCEAN)	Nominated	
Golden Trailer Awards	2015	Best Teaser/Trailer for a TV Series or Mini-series	"The Wheel" (AV Squad)	Won	
Golden Trailer Awards	2016	Best Teaser/Trailer for a TV Series or Mini-series	"Wicked" (Max)	Nominated	
Golden Trailer Awards	2017	Best Action (TV Spot / Trailer / Teaser for a series)	"Balconies (War)" (The Editpool)	Nominated	
Golden Trailer Awards	2017	Best Fantasy Adventure (TV Spot / Trailer / Teaser for a series)	"T & D" (Jax)	Nominated	
Golden Trailer Awards	2017	Best Fantasy Adventure (TV Spot / Trailer / Teaser for a series)	"Balconies (War)" (The Editpool)	Nominated	
Golden Trailer Awards	2018	Best Fantasy Adventure (TV Spot / Trailer / Teaser for a series)	"Legendary" (The Editpool)	Nominated	
Golden Trailer Awards	2018	Best Fantasy Adventure (TV Spot / Trailer / Teaser for a series)	"Survive" (Jax)	Nominated	
Golden Trailer Awards	2018	Best Promo for a TV Network	"Game of Thrones Image" (Trailer Park, Inc.)	Nominated	
Golden Trailer Awards	2018	Best TrailerByte for a TV Series/Streaming Series	"Season 7 Social Carousel" (Silk Factory)	Nominated	
Golden Trailer Awards	2019	Best Drama (TV Spot / Trailer / Teaser for a series)	"Forward" (Jax)	Nominated	
Golden Trailer Awards	2019	Best Fantasy Adventure (TV Spot / Trailer / Teaser for a series)	"Crypt" (Jax)	Won	
Golden Trailer Awards	2019	Best Original Score (TV Spot / Trailer / Teaser for a series)	"Forward" (Jax)	Nominated	
Gracie Awards	2012	Outstanding Female Rising Star in a Drama Series or Special	Emilia Clarke	Won	
Guinness World Records	2015	Most pirated TV program	Game of Thrones	Won	
Guinness World Records	2015	Most viewers sharing a single torrent file simultaneously	Game of Thrones	Won	
Guinness World Records	2016	Largest TV drama simulcast	Game of Thrones	Won	
Guinness World Records	2016	Most "in demand" TV show	Game of Thrones	Won	
Guinness World Records	2016	Most Emmy Awards for a drama series	Game of Thrones	Won	
Guinness World Records	2016	Most VES Awards won by a TV series	Game of Thrones	Won	
Hollywood Music in Media Awards	2014	Best Original Score – TV Show / Digital Streaming Series	Ramin Djawadi	Nominated	
Humanitas Prize	2017	60 Minute Network or Syndicated Television	David Benioff, D. B. Weiss (for "The Dragon and the Wolf")	Nominated	
International Film Music Critics Association Awards	2011	Best Original Score for a Television Series	Ramin Djawadi	Nominated	
International Film Music Critics Association Awards	2013	Best Original Score for a Television Series	Ramin Djawadi	Nominated	
International Film Music Critics Association Awards	2016	Best Original Score for a Television Series	Ramin Djawadi	Won	
International Film Music Critics Association Awards	2016	Film Music Composition of the Year	Ramin Djawadi for "Light of the Seven"	Nominated	
Jupiter Awards	2014	Best International TV Series	Game of Thrones	Won	
Kerrang! Awards	2012	Best TV Show	Game of Thrones	Won	
Kerrang! Awards	2014	Best TV Show	Game of Thrones	Won	
MTV Fandom Awards	2014	OMG Moment of the Year	Game of Thrones – The Purple Wedding	Won	
MTV Fandom Awards	2016	Fan Freak Out of the Year	Game of Thrones – Resurrection of Jon Snow	Nominated	
MTV Millennial Awards	2016	Killer Serie del Año	Game of Thrones	Won	
MTV Movie & TV Awards	2017	Show of the Year	Game of Thrones	Nominated	
MTV Movie & TV Awards	2017	Best Actor in a Show	Emilia Clarke	Nominated	
MTV Movie & TV Awards	2017	Tearjerker	Hodor's (Kristian Nairn) death	Nominated	
MTV Movie & TV Awards	2018	Best Show	Game of Thrones	Nominated	
MTV Movie & TV Awards	2018	Best Performance in a Show	Maisie Williams	Nominated	
MTV Movie & TV Awards	2018	Best Hero	Emilia Clarke	Nominated	
MTV Movie & TV Awards	2019	Best Show	Game of Thrones	Won	
MTV Movie & TV Awards	2019	Best Performance in a Show	Emilia Clarke	Nominated	
MTV Movie & TV Awards	2019	Best Hero	Maisie Williams	Nominated	
MTV Movie & TV Awards	2019	Best Fight	Arya Stark (Maisie Williams) vs. White Walkers	Nominated	
NewNowNext Awards	2012	TV You Betta Watch	Game of Thrones	Nominated	
NewNowNext Awards	2013	Cause You're Hot	Richard Madden	Nominated	
NewNowNext Awards	2014	Best New Television Actor	Pedro Pascal	Nominated	
Portal Awards	2011	Best Series	Game of Thrones	Won	
Portal Awards	2011	Best Actor	Sean Bean	Won	
Portal Awards	2011	Best Actress	Lena Headey	Nominated	
Portal Awards	2011	Best Supporting Actor	Peter Dinklage	Nominated	
Portal Awards	2011	Best Episode	"Winter Is Coming"	Won	
Portal Awards	2011	Best Young Actor	Isaac Hempstead-Wright	Nominated	
Portal Awards	2011	Best Young Actor	Maisie Williams	Nominated	
Portal Awards	2012	Best Series	Game of Thrones	Won	
Portal Awards	2012	Best Actor	Peter Dinklage	Nominated	
Portal Awards	2012	Best Actress	Lena Headey	Won	
Portal Awards	2012	Best Supporting Actor	Aidan Gillen	Nominated	
Portal Awards	2012	Best Supporting Actress	Michelle Fairley	Nominated	
Portal Awards	2012	Best Supporting Actress	Maisie Williams	Won	
Portal Awards	2012	Best Episode	"The Ghost of Harrenhal"	Nominated	
Portal Awards	2012	Best Young Actor	Jack Gleeson	Nominated	
Portal Awards	2012	Best Young Actor	Maisie Williams	Won	
Royal Television Society Awards	2014	International Program	Game of Thrones	Won	
SFX Awards	2012	Best New TV Show	David Benioff and D. B. Weiss	Won	
SFX Awards	2012	Best TV Show	David Benioff and D. B. Weiss	Nominated	
SFX Awards	2012	Best Actress	Maisie Williams	Nominated	
SFX Awards	2012	Best Actor	Peter Dinklage	Nominated	
SFX Awards	2013	Best Actress	Emilia Clarke	Won	
SFX Awards	2013	Best Actress	Lena Headey	Nominated	
SFX Awards	2013	Best Actor	Peter Dinklage	Nominated	
SFX Awards	2015	Best TV Show	Game of Thrones	Nominated	
SFX Awards	2015	Best Actress	Maisie Williams	Nominated	
SFX Awards	2015	Best Actor	Peter Dinklage	Nominated	
SFX Awards	2015	Best Villain	Charles Dance as Tywin Lannister	Nominated	
SFX Awards	2015	Biggest Disappointment	No Hodor in Game of Thrones season five	Nominated	
SFX Awards	2015	Best TV Episode	"The Mountain and the Viper"	Nominated	
Shorty Awards	2016	Favorite TV Show	Game of Thrones	Nominated	
Shorty Awards	2016	GIF of The Year	Game of Thrones Come at Me Bro	Nominated	
TV Choice Awards	2014	Best International Show	Game of Thrones	Won	
TV Choice Awards	2016	Best International Show	Game of Thrones	Won	
USC Scripter Awards	2016	Best Adapted Screenplay	David Benioff and D. B. Weiss (for "Hardhome")	Nominated	
USC Scripter Awards	2017	Best Adapted Screenplay	David Benioff and D. B. Weiss (for "The Winds of Winter")	Nominated	
Webby Awards	2016	Best Overall Social Presence	Game of Thrones	Won	
Webby Awards	2017	Best Overall Social Presence	Game of Thrones	Won	
Webby Awards	2017	Unscripted (Branded)	Battle of the Bastards Featurette	Won	
Webby Awards	2018	Best Overall Social Presence	Game of Thrones	Won	
Webby Awards	2018	Best Trailer	Game of Thrones	Won	
Webby Awards	2018	Best Digital Campaign	Game of Thrones	Won	
Women's Image Network Awards	2011	Actress Drama Series	Lena Headey	Nominated	
Women's Image Network Awards	2014	Actress Drama Series	Lena Headey	Won	
World Soundtrack Awards	2016	Television Composer of the Year	Ramin Djawadi	Nominated	
World Soundtrack Awards	2018	Television Composer of the Year	Ramin Djawadi	Won	
Young Artist Awards	2013	Best Performance in a TV Series – Supporting Young Actor	Isaac Hempstead-Wright	Nominated	
Young Artist Awards	2013	Best Performance in a TV Series – Supporting Young Actress	Sophie Turner	Nominated	
Young Artist Awards	2013	Best Performance in a TV Series – Supporting Young Actress	Maisie Williams	Nominated	
Young Hollywood Awards	2013	Actor of the Year	Kit Harington	Won	
Young Hollywood Awards	2014	Bingeworthy TV Show	Game of Thrones	Nominated	
Young Hollywood Awards	2014	We Love to Hate You	Jack Gleeson	Nominated	
Zulu Awards	2017	Best Actor	Nikolaj Coster-Waldau	Nominated	
