= MTV Movie & TV Award for Best Show =

List of MTV best show winners and nominees

This is a following list of the MTV Movie & TV Award winners and nominees for Best Show. The category debuted in 2017 when the ceremony began jointly celebrating cinema and television under the name Show of the Year.

== Winners and nominees ==
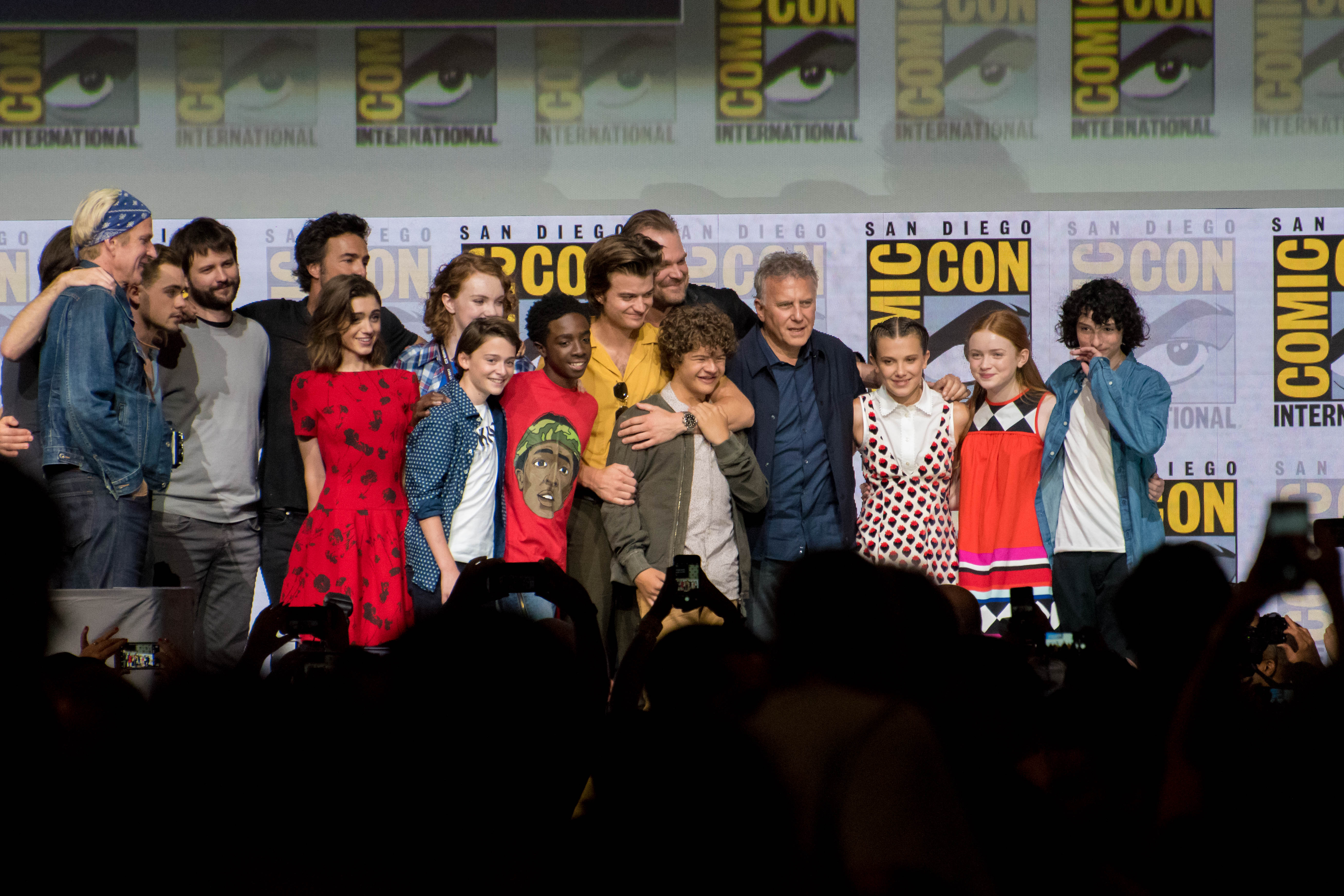
2017 and 2018 winners, Stranger Things

=== 2010s ===
Year	Show	Network	Ref
2017	Stranger Things	Netflix	
2017	Atlanta	FX	
2017	Game of Thrones	HBO	
2017	Insecure	HBO	
2017	Pretty Little Liars	Freeform	
2017	This Is Us	NBC	
2018	Stranger Things	Netflix	
2018	Game of Thrones	HBO	
2018	Grown-ish	Freeform	
2018	Riverdale	The CW	
2018	13 Reasons Why	Netflix	
2019	Game of Thrones	HBO	
2019	Big Mouth	Netflix	
2019	The Haunting of Hill House	Netflix	
2019	Riverdale	The CW	
2019	Schitt's Creek	Pop TV	

=== 2020s ===
Year	Show	Network	Ref
2021	WandaVision	Disney+	
2021	The Boys	Amazon Prime Video	
2021	Bridgerton	Netflix	
2021	Cobra Kai	Netflix	
2021	Emily in Paris	Netflix	
2022	Euphoria	HBO	
2022	Inventing Anna	Netflix	
2022	Loki	Disney+	
2022	Squid Game	Netflix	
2022	Ted Lasso	Apple TV+	
2022	Yellowstone	Paramount Network	
2023
2023	The Last of Us	HBO	
2023	Stranger Things	Netflix	
2023	Wednesday	Netflix	
2023	The White Lotus	HBO	
2023	Wolf Pack	Paramount+	
2023	Yellowstone	Paramount Network	
2023	Yellowjackets	Showtime	

== Multiple wins and nominations ==
The following series received multiple nominations:

Nominations	Series
3	Game of Thrones
3	Stranger Things
2	Riverdale

The following series received multiple awards:

Awards	Series
2	Stranger Things

The following networks received multiple nominations:

Nominations	Network
12	Netflix
7	HBO
2	Disney+
2	Freeform
2	Paramount Network
2	The CW

The following networks received multiple awards:

Awards	Network
3	HBO
2	Netflix
