= Curtis Rivers =

English life coach & author (born 1970)

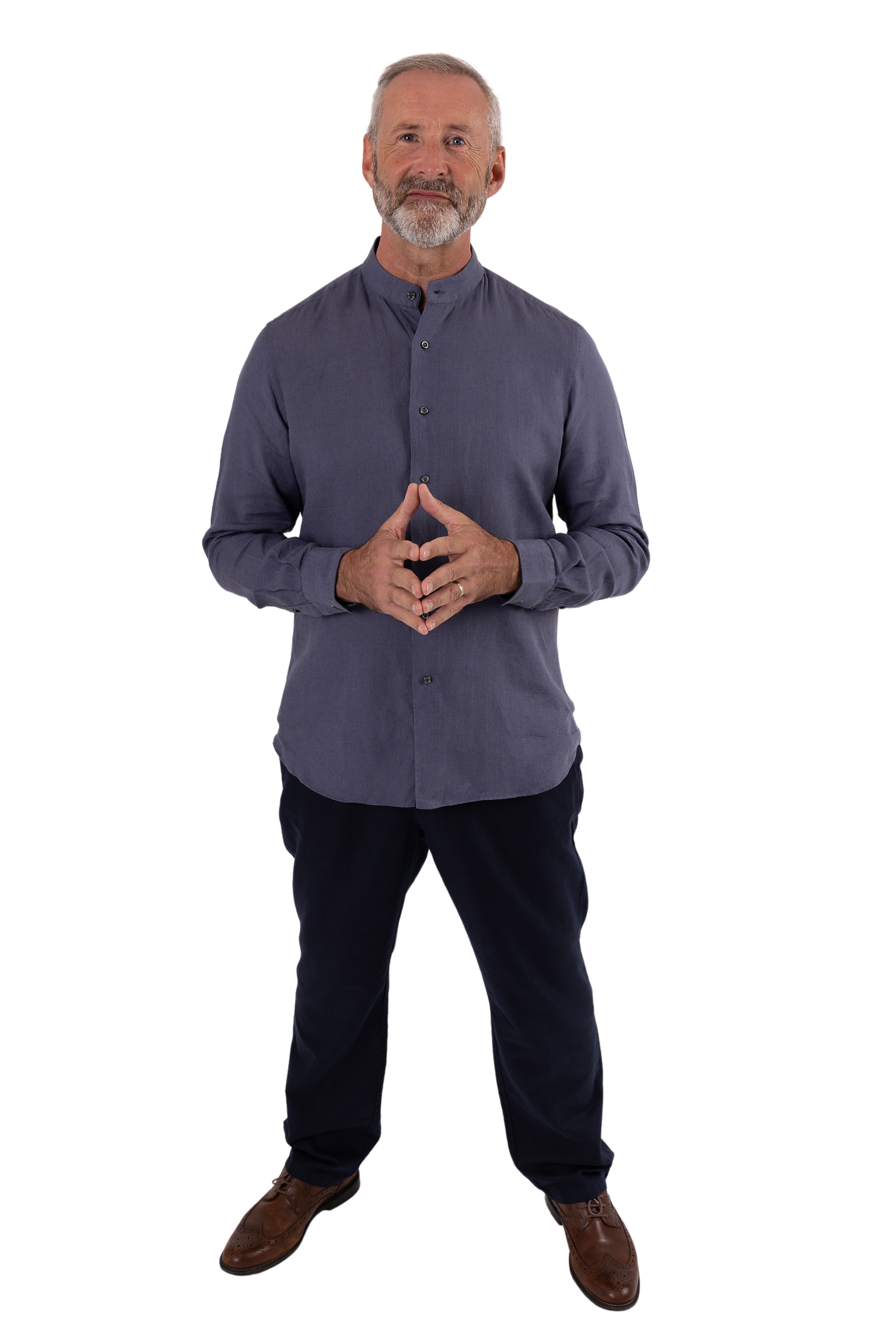
- Rivers in 2024
- Born: March 15, 1970 (age 56)
- Occupations: Life coach, author, speaker
- Notable work: The Fearless Path (2017)
- Spouse: Lucy Rivers (m. 2019)
- Website: curtisrivers.com

Curtis Rivers (born 15 March 1970) is an English life coach, author, speaker, and former movie stuntman.

Rivers is a two-time Guinness World Record holder and worked in film and television as a stunt performer and stunt coordinator for over three decades.

== Early life and education ==
Curtis Rivers was born on 15 March 1970 in Guisborough, North Yorkshire. He attended Ormesby Comprehensive School (now known as Outwood Academy Ormesby), graduating in 1986.

In 1993, he relocated to Nottingham to pursue acting to obtain an Equity card through the British Actors’ Equity Association.

He qualified as a member of the British Stunt Register in 1996.

== Career ==
=== Movie Stuntman ===
Rivers achieved provisional Actors Equity membership in 1993, and became a full member of the actors union in 1995, following his role as ‘DC Galley’ in the hit TV series ‘The Chief’, opposite Martin Shaw.

He was accepted onto The British Stunt Register a year later in 1996, and went on to perform stunts in films such as James Bond, Fury, Thor: The Dark World, Captain America: The First Avenger, Snow White and the Huntsman, Sherlock Holmes: A Game of Shadows, Robin Hood, The Sands of Time, The Wolfman, St Trinian's / St Trinian's 2: The Legend of Fritton's Gold, National Treasure: Book of Secrets and The Da Vinci Code.

In movies, Rivers has been a stunt double for Christopher Lee, James Caviezel, Rupert Everett, Mark Strong, Hugo Weaving, Jim Broadbent, Matthew MacFadyen, Patrick Bergin, Martin Kemp, Jimmy Nail, Graham McTavish, and Sam Douglas.

In television, he has been a stunt double for Martin Clunes, Trevor Eve, Stephen Tompkinson, Malcolm Sinclair, James Purefoy, Charlie Cox, Tim Dutton, Nick Brimble, Peter Marinker, and Mark Charnock.

He also doubled for John Barrowman for the first 3 seasons of Torchwood, as well as in Doctor Who, falling backward 140 feet (43 m) from the British Gas Building in Cardiff for the first episode of Torchwood's second season – "Kiss Kiss, Bang Bang".

He has also performed stunts in the hit HBO series Game of Thrones, in which he received the 2015 Screen Actors Guild Award for Outstanding Performance by a Stunt Ensemble in a Television Series.

As well as working as a stunt coordinator, Rivers also worked as a Second Unit Director.

=== Holistic Life Coach ===
Rivers began coaching at the age of 19, when he worked with the Teesside University Fencing Team. Over the course of his career in film and television, he also coached a wide variety of actors and actresses.

In 2010, he expanded into life coaching, offering guidance to individuals outside the entertainment industry while continuing his work as a stunt performer. Around this time, he also began public speaking, initially through invitations from former teachers to speak at local schools.

He trained in Neuro-Linguistic Programming (NLP), receiving a diploma and becoming a licensed NLP Practitioner in 2012. In 2013, he published his first book, Seven Paths to Freedom. He later undertook additional training in areas such as Emotional Freedom Technique and Soul Transformation Therapy.

In 2024, Rivers stepped back from stunt work to establish Curtis Rivers Coaching as a full-time practice, focusing on personal development and helping individuals explore purpose and direction in their lives.

== Selected publications ==
He is the author of two books – Seven Paths to Freedom and The Fearless Path.

Both works are self-help books, written to create a positive mindset in their readers. Each book received 100% five-star reviews, with The Fearless Path becoming an Amazon Bestseller in the Guru Chart in December 2017. The Fearless Path went on to receive numerous literary awards, such as 'Body Mind Spirit Book Awards' (1st place) in April 2018, the 'Readers Favourite Award's in November 2018, and the 'International Publishing Awards' (2 x Gold Medal Winner in both the Personal Growth category and the Body / Mind / Spirit category) in September 2018, which he received in Miami, Florida."

== Awards and world records ==
=== Longest Parachute Jump ===
On 14 February 2002, Rivers set a Guinness World Record for the longest parachute jump. He ascended in a hot-air balloon from Pozoblanco, Spain, and immediately deployed his parachute upon jumping. He remained airborne for 45 minutes, surpassing the previous record by five minutes.

=== Highest Bungee Jump ===
On 5 May 2002, he completed a bungee jump from a hot-air balloon at 15,200 feet above Puertollano, Spain, setting a second Guinness World Record.

Both records required the use of thermal clothing due to the sub-zero temperatures at altitude.

=== Screen Actors Guild Awards ===
- 2011: Nominated for Outstanding Performance by a Stunt Ensemble in a Motion Picture for Robin Hood.
- 2015: Received the award for Outstanding Performance by a Stunt Ensemble in a Television Series for Game of Thrones.

=== Book award ===
- April 2018: Gold Medal – The Fearless Path, Body, Mind, Spirit Book Awards (Beverly Hills, California).
- September 2018: First place (Personal Growth) – The Fearless Path, International Publisher Awards (Miami, Florida).
- September 2018: First place (Mind, Body & Spirit) – The Fearless Path, International Publisher Awards (Miami, Florida).
- November 2018: 5 Star Medal Winner (Non-Fiction – Self Help) – The Fearless Path, Readers Favorite (Louisville, Kentucky).
