= Bernadette Caulfield =

American television producer

- Occupation: Television producer
- Writing career
- Notable works: The X-Files; Big Love; Game of Thrones

Bernadette Caulfield is an American television producer. She worked on the supernatural drama series The X-Files and the HBO drama series Big Love and Game of Thrones. She was nominated for the Emmy Award for outstanding drama series for her work on Big Love, and won four Emmys for her work on Game of Thrones.

== Biography ==
Caulfield went to high school in Rochester, New York where she worked at a local movie theater. In 1981, she worked as a production assistant on a movie that was being filmed locally. In 1982, she moved to Los Angeles where she began her career working on a number of television series including Steven Bochco's Brooklyn South and Philly; Michael Mann's Robbery Homicide Division and Ridley Scott's and Tony Scott's The Good Wife.

Caulfield joined the crew of The X-Files as the on set producer for the sixth season in 1998. The X-Files was created by Chris Carter and focuses on a pair of FBI agents investigating cases with links to the paranormal. She reprised this role for the seventh season in 1999 but left the crew after the season.

In 2005 Caulfield joined the crew of Carnivale for the show's second season. The HBO drama series followed a travelling circus with supernatural ties. The show was cancelled after completing the second season.

In 2006 Caulfield joined the crew of new HBO drama Big Love as a producer for the pilot episode. She became unit production manager (UPM) in addition to being a producer for the first season. She remained in this role for the second season in 2007. She was promoted to co-executive producer and remained UPM for the third season in 2009. At the 2009 ceremony Caulfield and the rest of the production team were nominated for the Primetime Emmy Award for Outstanding Drama Series for their work on the third season. She was promoted again to executive producer for the fourth season and remained UPM. Caulfield left the crew after the fourth season.

== Awards and nominations ==
- 2009 Emmy Award nomination for Outstanding Drama Series for Big Love season 3
