= Lancaster slave trade =

Slavery in northern England

Lancaster, Lancashire, a port city in north-west England, was involved in the transatlantic slave trade. Lancaster's part in the trade developed in the 17th century and was linked to that of Liverpool also in north-west England. It became the fourth largest slave-trading centre in England and the most prominent in Lancashire. Lancaster slavers became influential within the city, and also played a role in getting parliamentary support for the development of the Port of Lancaster.

== Prominent Lancaster slavers ==
- Abraham Rawlinson (1738–1803), MP for Lancaster
- Charles Inman (1725-1767), commissioner for the Lancaster Port Commission
- Thomas Hinde (1720 – 1798), twice Mayor of Lancaster
- Dodshon Foster (1755-1758), commissioner for the Lancaster Port Commission
- Thomas Satterthwaite (1755-1758), commissioner for the Lancaster Port Commission
- Robert Dodson (1764-1767)
