= Jane Jones =

Jane Jones may refer to:

- Jane Wenham-Jones (born 1964), author, journalist, presenter
- Jane C. Wright (1919–2013), also known as Jane Jones, cancer researcher and surgeon
- Jane Elizabeth Jones (1813–1896), abolitionist
- Jane Jones (printer) (died 1739), Irish printer, bookseller, and newspaper proprietor
- Jane Jones (actress), actress in the 1937 film Slave Ship
- Jane Jones, a character in the 2004 film Closer

== See also ==
- Janie Jones (disambiguation)
