= World of A Song of Ice and Fire =

Fictional world created by George R. R. Martin

The Known World
- "A Map of The Known World"; by George R. R. Martin
- First appearance: Literature: A Game of Thrones (1996); Television: "Winter Is Coming" (2011)
- Created by: George R. R. Martin
- Based on: A Song of Ice and Fire; The World of Ice & Fire
- Genre: Novel/Television

In-universe information
- Type: Fantasy world
- Locations: Westeros; Essos; Sothoryos; Ulthos
- Related: Game of Thrones (franchise)

The fictional world in which the A Song of Ice and Fire novels by George R. R. Martin take place is divided into several continents, known collectively as The Known World.

Most of the story takes place on the continent of Westeros and in a large political entity known as the Seven Kingdoms. Those kingdoms are spread across nine regions: the North, the Iron Islands, the Riverlands, the Vale, the Westerlands, the Stormlands, the Reach, the Crownlands, and Dorne. A massive wall of ice and old magic separates the Seven Kingdoms from the largely unmapped area to the north. The vast continent of Essos is located east of Westeros, across the Narrow Sea. The closest foreign nations to Westeros are the Free Cities, a collection of nine independent city-states along the western edge of Essos. The lands along the southern coastline of Essos are called the Lands of the Summer Sea and include Slaver's Bay and the ruins of Valyria. The latter is the former home of the ancestors of House Targaryen. To the south of Essos are the continents of Sothoryos and Ulthos, which in the narrative are largely unexplored.

The planet experiences erratic seasons of unpredictable duration that can last for many years. At the beginning of A Song of Ice and Fire, Westeros has enjoyed a decade-long summer, and many fear that an even longer and harsher winter will follow.

George R. R. Martin set the Ice and Fire story in an alternative world to Earth, a "secondary world". Martin has also suggested that the world may be larger than the real world planet Earth. The Ice and Fire narrative is set in a post-magic world where people no longer believe in supernatural things such as the Others. Although the characters understand the natural aspects of their world, they do not know or understand its magical elements. (Note: Orr, David (August 12, 2011). "Dragons Ascendant: George R. R. Martin and the Rise of Fantasy". The New York Times. Archived from the original on 2022-01-02.) Religion, though, has a significant role in the lives of people, and the characters practice many different religions.

== Maps ==
Map	Game	Clash	Storm	Feast	Dance	(Lands)
The North of Westeros	Yes	Yes	Yes	Yes	Yes^{US}	Yes
The South of Westeros	Yes	Yes	Yes	Yes	Yes^{US}	Yes
King's Landing city map		Yes				Yes
Beyond the Wall			Yes		Yes	Yes
Slaver's Bay, Valyria, and Sothoryos			Yes		Yes	Yes
The Iron Islands				Yes		
The Free Cities					Yes	Yes

A Game of Thrones, the first installment of the A Song of Ice and Fire series, has two maps of Westeros. Each new book has added one or two maps so that, as of A Dance with Dragons, seven maps of the fictional world are available in the books. Martin said in 2003 that complete world maps were not made available so that readers may better identify with people of the real Middle Ages who were uneducated about distant places. (Note: Zadravec, Goran (December 2003). "An Interview With George R. R. Martin". mezmera.posluh.hr. Archived from the original on December 23, 2011. (Interview approved by GRRM Archived February 4, 2012, at the Wayback Machine.)) He also did not "subscribe to the theory put forth in The Tough Guide To Fantasyland ... that eventually the characters must visit every place shown on The Map." He conceded, however, that readers may be able to piece together a world map by the end of the series. He was intentionally vague about the size of the Ice and Fire world, omitting a scale on the maps to discourage prediction of travel lengths based on measured distances. A new map artist was used in A Dance with Dragons so that the maps are available in two versions by James Sinclair and Jeffrey L. Ward, depending on the book. The old maps were redone to match the style of the new ones.

A set of foldout maps was published on October 30, 2012, as The Lands of Ice and Fire (ISBN 978-0345538543). The illustrator and cartographer Jonathan Roberts drew the maps, based on drafts by Martin. The twelve maps in the set are entitled "The Known World", "The West", "Central Essos", "The East", "Westeros", "Beyond The Wall", "The Free Cities", "Slaver's Bay", "The Dothraki Sea", "King's Landing", "Braavos", and "Journeys". The latter tracks the paths taken by the novels' characters.

== Westeros ==
Westeros
- A Song of Ice and Fire location
- A map of the Westeros continent
- First appearance: A Game of Thrones
- Created by: George R. R. Martin
- Genre: High fantasy

In-universe information
- Type: Continent
- Locations: King's Landing, Seven Kingdoms
- Characters: Tyrion Lannister, Jon Snow, Daenerys Targaryen, Eddard Stark, Catelyn Stark, Sansa Stark, Arya Stark, Bran Stark, Cersei Lannister, Jaime Lannister, Theon Greyjoy

The story takes place primarily on an elongated continent called Westeros, which is roughly the size of South America. The continent is home to the Seven Kingdoms, located to the south side of the Wall, a massive man-made ice wall (allegedly fused with magic) 700 feet in height and spanning east–west for 300 miles from coast to coast. The Seven Kingdoms are further divided into the so-called "North" and "South" by a swamp-rich isthmus called the Neck. The land north of the Wall still makes up a large chunk of Westeros (being roughly the size of Canada), but remains largely unmapped and unexplored, especially the ice field region north and west of a massive mountain range called the Frostfangs, which marks the farthest geographic limit of human settlements. The northern extent of the continent is therefore unknown, although thought to be continuous with a polar ice cap north of the Shivering Sea known as the White Waste.

At the novel's beginning, the majority of Westeros is united under the rule of a single king, whose seat is the "Iron Throne" in the city of King's Landing. The king has a large number of minor direct vassals in the Crownlands, which surround King's Landing. Each of the other regions is functionally controlled by a different major noble house, all of which wield significant power in their own lands while owing fealty to the Iron Throne. Martin here drew inspiration from medieval European history, in particular the Hundred Years' War, the Crusades, the Albigensian Crusade, and the Wars of the Roses.

The first inhabitants of the continent were the Children of the Forest, a nature-worshipping Stone Age anthropoid species who carved the faces of their gods in weirwood trees. Some time later, Bronze Age human settlers, known as the First Men, migrated from Essos via a land bridge at the southeastern end of the continent and gradually spread to the entire continent. The First Men's attempts to chop down forests and cultivate the land led to a millennia-long war with the Children of the Forest, which was eventually settled by an agreement known as "The Pact". This was the beginning of the Age of Heroes, during which the First Men adopted the religion of the Children of the Forest. Those gods later became known in Westeros as the Old Gods.

Eight thousand years before the events of the novels, an enigmatic arctic humanoid species called the Others emerged from the Land of Always Winter, the northernmost part of Westeros, during the decades-long winter known as "The Long Night". The Children of the Forest and the First Men allied to repel the Others, and then built the Wall barring passage from the far north. The region north of the Wall has since been collectively known as the land "Beyond the Wall" and is settled by tribal descendants of the First Men known as the Wildlings or Free Folk.

Sometime later, the Iron Age humans from Essos, called the Andals, invaded Westeros, bringing with them the Faith of the Seven. One by one, kingdoms of the First Men south of the Neck fell to the Andals, and only the North remained unconquered. The Children of the Forest were slaughtered and disappeared from Andal lands. Over time, seven relatively stable feudal kingdoms were forged across Westeros. However, their territories fluctuated over the next few thousand years through constant warfare, and no kingdom remained dominant for long:

- The Kingdom of the North, ruled by House Stark of Winterfell
- The Kingdom of the Isles and the Rivers, ruled by House Hoare of Harrenhal
- The Kingdom of Mountain and Vale, ruled by House Arryn of the Eyrie
- The Kingdom of the Rock, ruled by House Lannister of Casterly Rock
- The Storm Kingdom, ruled by House Durrandon of Storm's End
- The Kingdom of the Reach, ruled by House Gardener of Highgarden
- The Principality of Dorne, ruled by House Martell of Sunspear.

Three hundred years before the novels begin, the Targaryen dragonlord Aegon the Conqueror and his two sister-wives Visenya and Rhaenys, whose ancestors migrated from Valyria to Dragonstone a century prior, invaded the Westerosi mainland and landed his army at the mouth of the Blackwater Rush. The three assembled a temporary bastion called "Aegonfort", which later grew into the massive capital city known as King's Landing. Aided by their three formidable fire-breathing dragons, the Targaryen armies subdued six of the Seven Kingdoms through conquest or treaty, wiping out three of the seven ruling houses that refused to bend their knees, replacing house Durrandon with house Baratheon, house Gardener with house Tyrell, and house Hoare with houses Tully (in the Riverlands) and Greyjoy (on the Iron Islands). Only the defiant Dorne remained independent for almost another two hundred years through asymmetric guerrilla resistance, until it was finally absorbed under the Iron Throne through a marriage-alliance by King Daeron II in 187 AC. The Targaryens built the Iron Throne, forged from the swords of their defeated enemies by dragonfire. They also annexed the land regions of the riverlands and stormlands around the Blackwater Bay as the Crownlands. House Targaryen remained the ruling house of the Seven Kingdoms for almost three centuries until they were overthrown by a rebellion led by Robert Baratheon in 283 AC, who then became the first king of the Seven Kingdoms not of House Targaryen.

Martin took the name Westeros from the Scottish region Wester Ross.

The southern half of Westeros is based on an inverted map of Ireland.

=== The North ===
The North consists of the northern half of the Seven Kingdoms and is ruled by House Stark from their castle at Winterfell. The North is sparsely populated, but nearly as big as the other six southern kingdoms combined. Martin compared the North to Scotland. The climate is cold overall, with hard winters and mild snows common regardless of the season. Beyond the wall in the far north, the climate is polar, with heavy snow, while further south it is milder, with more rain. The region's northern border is the Gift, a stretch of land 50 leagues wide given to the possession of the Night's Watch. However, due to Wildling raids, it is filled with abandoned towns and farms.

An isthmus called The Neck separates the North from the South. It is dominated by swamplands and is home to short, marsh-dwelling crannogmen ruled by House Reed of Greywater Watch, loyal bannermen of House Stark. The Neck's difficult wetland terrain is infested by predatory lizard-lions, restricting the only dryland passage to a causeway commanded by the almost impenetrable stronghold of Moat Cailin, which protected the North from land invasion from the south for thousands of years. The city of White Harbor, located at the mouth of the White Knife River, is a thriving port and the fifth largest settlement in the Seven Kingdoms.

Illegitimate children born of a noble parent and acknowledged by said parent in the North are given the surname Snow.

==== Winterfell ====
Winterfell is the ancestral castle of House Stark and the political capital of the North. Located at the geographical center of the North, it has a cold, subarctic climate with snowy winters and cool summers. The castle was built over a natural hot spring, whose scalding water runs inside the castle walls and warms its halls and rooms as well as the glass garden at its northwestern corner. There are several open pools where heated water collects within the godswood. The hot spring also prevents the ground from freezing. The castle has deep catacombs called "the crypt", where bodies of deceased Starks are entombed behind statues in their likeness with a direwolf at their feet and their swords in their hands. The tombs have been used since the old kings of the North, known as the Kings of Winter, were in power. They ruled since before the arrival of the Andals.

To depict Winterfell, both the pilot and season 1 of the television adaptation used the 16th-century clock tower and ancient courtyard of Castle Ward in County Down, Northern Ireland. Doune Castle in Stirling, Scotland, which was previously featured as Castle Anthrax in the film Monty Python and the Holy Grail, was also used for exterior scenes. Saintfield Estates stood in as Winterfell's godswood, an enclosed wooded area where characters can worship the old gods beside trees with faces carved in their bark. A car park stood in for Winterfell's courtyard, and a wine cellar was used to depict the Stark family crypt. Tollymore Forest featured prominently in the prologue of the pilot episode and in the pivotal scene where the Starks first find the direwolves. Cairncastle, meanwhile, served as the location where Ned Stark beheads the deserter Will. The interior of Winterfell, such as the Tower of the First Keep, the Great Hall, and Catelyn's bedchamber, was filmed at The Paint Hall studio. Set designer Gemma Jackson said, "Winterfell was based on a Scottish castle."

==== White Harbor ====
White Harbor is a port city located at the mouth of the White Knife, the largest river in the North. It is the largest settlement north of the Neck, but is the smallest of the five major cities in the Seven Kingdoms. The city contains New Castle, the seat of House Manderly, the wealthiest noble house of the North and the second-most powerful vassal under House Stark (behind only House Bolton) in terms of military strength.

White Harbor is the North's economic and trading capital, as well as it primary naval and shipbuilding center. Due to its location as a transport hub, White Harbor has more southern visitors and followers of the Faith of the Seven than anywhere else in the North. There are also a strong tradition of knighthood due to the historical fact that House Manderly was an exiled southern house who swore fealty to House Stark after given refuge.

=== The Iron Islands ===
The Iron Islands are a group of seven islands to the west of Westeros—Pyke, Great Wyk, Old Wyk, Harlaw, Saltcliffe, Blacktyde, and Orkmont—in Ironman's Bay off the west coast of the continent. Ruled by House Greyjoy of Pyke, the isles are described as bare and barren, with the local weather being "windy and cold, and damp". The members of this seafaring nation are known in the rest of Westeros as Ironmen, and to themselves as Ironborn. Illegitimate children born in the Iron Islands are given the surname Pyke.

For fierce raids, the Ironmen are titled the "terror of the seas". They worship the Drowned God, who "had made them to reave and rape, to carve out kingdoms and write their names in fire and blood and song". The appendix of A Game of Thrones summarizes that the Ironmen once ruled over the Riverlands and much of the western coast of Westeros. When Aegon the Conqueror extinguished Harren the Black's line, he chose House Greyjoy as the new rulers of the Ironmen.

==== Pyke ====
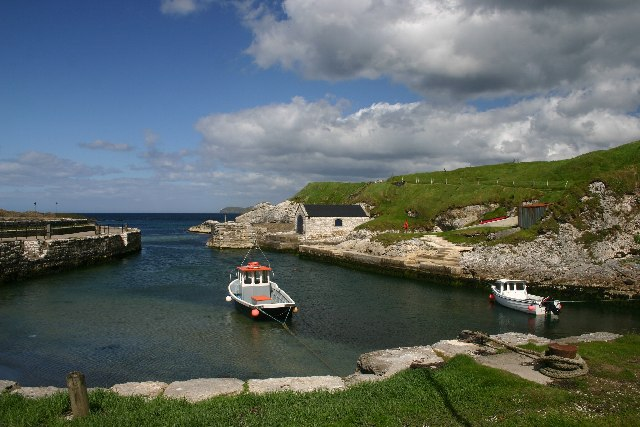
For the TV adaptation, the harbour of Ballintoy in Northern Ireland was redressed as the port of Pyke.

Pyke is the seat of House Greyjoy. The television adaptation filmed the scenes of Pyke's port at Lordsport Harbour in Ballintoy Harbour, in Northern Ireland's County Antrim. The sea has worn away much of the rock on which Pyke originally stood, so the castle now consists mostly of a main keep on the main island and smaller towers perched on rocks surrounded by sea.

==== Old Wyk ====
Old Wyk is the smallest and holiest island in the Iron Islands. It is where Kingsmoots are held, and where the Grey King slew Nagga, a sea dragon, and made a court of his bones.

=== The Riverlands ===
The Riverlands are the populous and fertile areas surrounding the forks of the river Trident on Westeros. While they form one of the nine regions of Westeros, the Riverlands' central location and geographic features made the region an inter-kingdom battle zone that changed hands rather than becoming its own 'eighth' kingdom of the Seven Kingdoms. Centrally located between the Westerlands, the Crownlands, the Vale, and the North, and lacking the natural defenses of other regions, they have seen frequent warfare. The first ruler to unite the Riverlands was Benedict Justman, but the Justman dynasty died out three centuries later. The Durrandons conquered the Riverlands, but lost rule of it to Harwyn "Hardhand" Hoare, King of the Iron Islands. At the time of Aegon's conquest, the Riverlands were ruled by Harwyn's grandson, Harren the Black, king of the Iron Islands, and the Tullys were local nobles who rebelled against him by joining Aegon the Conqueror. As with Westerosi customs to give bastards a surname showing their origins, illegitimate children born in the Riverlands are given the surname Rivers.

==== Harrenhal ====
Harrenhal is an enormous ruined castle and is the site of many important events in the novels. Harrenhal was built by Ironborn king Harren the Black, after his conquest of the Riverlands, intending to make it the largest fortification ever built in Westeros. The castle has been described as so large that an entire army was needed to garrison it. The Great Hall had 35 hearths and seated thousands. Shortly after the castle was completed, Aegon the Conqueror's dragon slew Harren, his sons, and his entire army by setting the castle alight.

Since then, the ruins of the castle have been occupied by a variety of houses, all of which eventually became extinct. As a result, the people of Westeros believe the castle is cursed. The logistical and economic difficulties inherent in keeping such an enormous castle maintained and garrisoned has made it something of a white elephant. At the start of the War of the Five Kings, the castle is in ruins, with only a small part still habitable, and it is held by Lady Shella Whent, the last of her house. She is stripped of Harrenhal when the Lannisters take her castle. The castle changes hands many times throughout the novels, and many of its owners meet unpleasant ends.

==== Riverrun ====
Riverrun is the ancestral stronghold of House Tully. The castle is located along one of the "forks" of the Trident and controls access to the interior of Westeros. The castle is bordered on two sides by the Tumblestone River and the Red Fork. The third side fronts on a massive manmade ditch. It was built by Ser Axel Tully on land he received from the Andal king Armistead Vance.

The castle is the location of Robb Stark's great victory over House Lannister and the site of his crowning. By the end of A Feast for Crows, Brynden Tully surrenders the castle to Jaime Lannister to spare further bloodshed. Riverrun then passed into the hands of Emmon Frey, an ally of House Lannister.

==== The Twins ====
The Twins is a large double castle straddling the Green Fork river; the two halves of the castle are connected by a bridge that is the only crossing of the river for hundreds of miles. The Twins is the seat of House Frey, which has grown wealthy by charging a toll of all those who cross for the past six centuries. Because the Freys are both wealthy and numerous, theirs is one of the most powerful houses sworn to House Tully. The castle's strategic position gives House Frey enormous importance in times of war.

When Robb Stark goes to The Twins to repair his alliance with House Frey, the Freys massacre him, his mother, and his army (and in the TV adaptation, his wife): an event known as "The Red Wedding", which violates native customs of guest right and incurs enmity throughout the Seven Kingdoms, especially in the Riverlands and North.

=== The Vale of Arryn ===
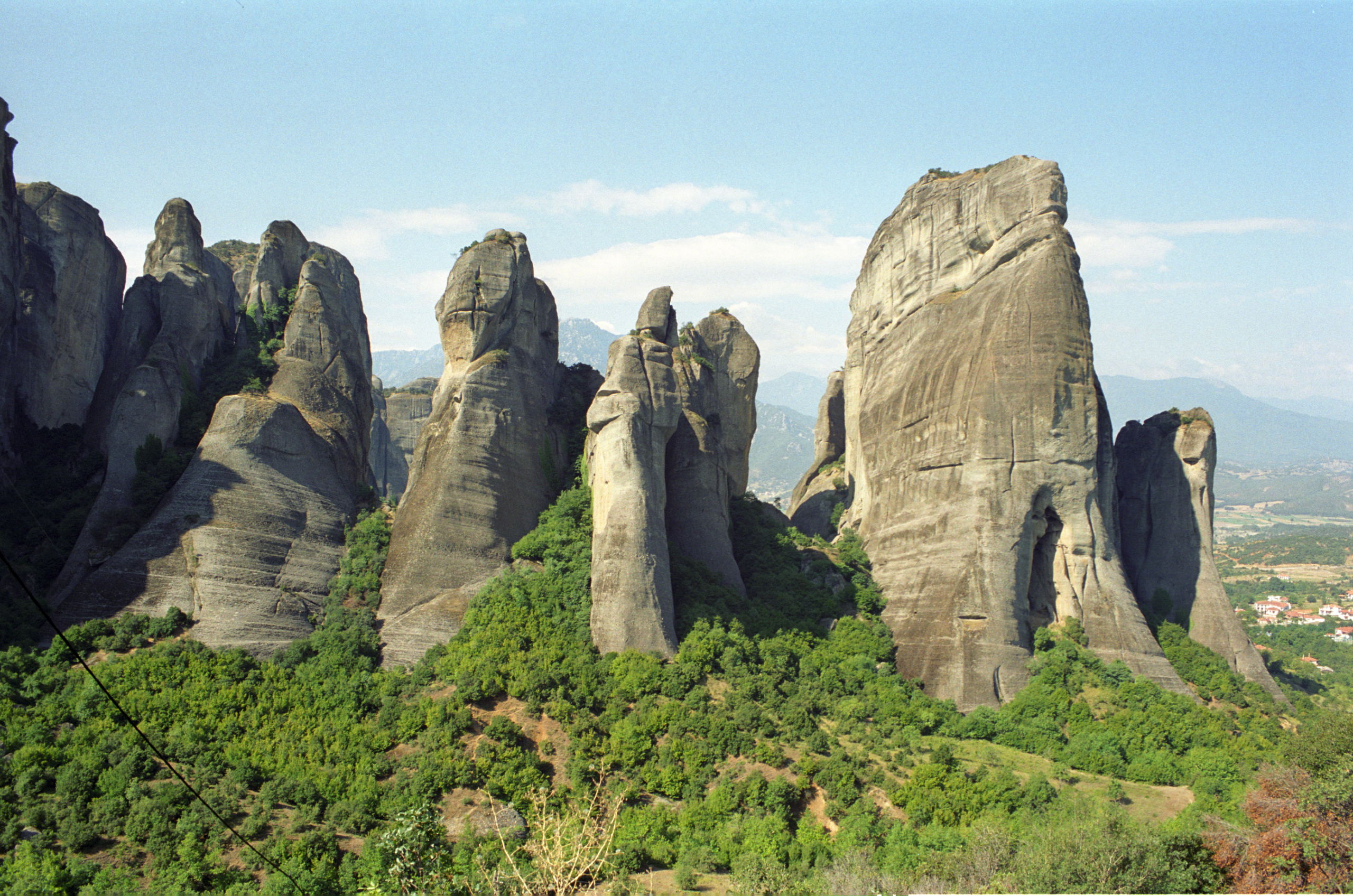
For the TV adaptation, images of the Greek rock formations of Meteora were used for the composite views of the Vale.

The Vale is the area surrounded almost completely by the Mountains of the Moon in the east of Westeros. The Vale is under the rulership of House Arryn, one of the oldest lines of Andal nobility and formerly Kings of Mountain and Vale. Their seat, the Eyrie, is a castle high in the mountains, small but considered unassailable. The only way to reach the Vale is by a mountain road teeming with animals called 'shadowcats', rock slides, and dangerous mountain clans. The mountain road ends at the Vale's sole entrance, the Bloody Gate: a pair of twin watchtowers, connected by a covered bridge, on the rocky mountain slopes over a very narrow path. The protection of the surrounding mountains gives the Vale itself a temperate climate, fertile meadows, and woods. The snowmelt from the mountains and a constant waterfall that never freezes, named Alyssa's Tears, provide plentiful water. The Vale has rich black soil, wide slow-moving rivers, and hundreds of small lakes. Illegitimate children born in the Vale are given the surname Stone.

==== The Eyrie ====
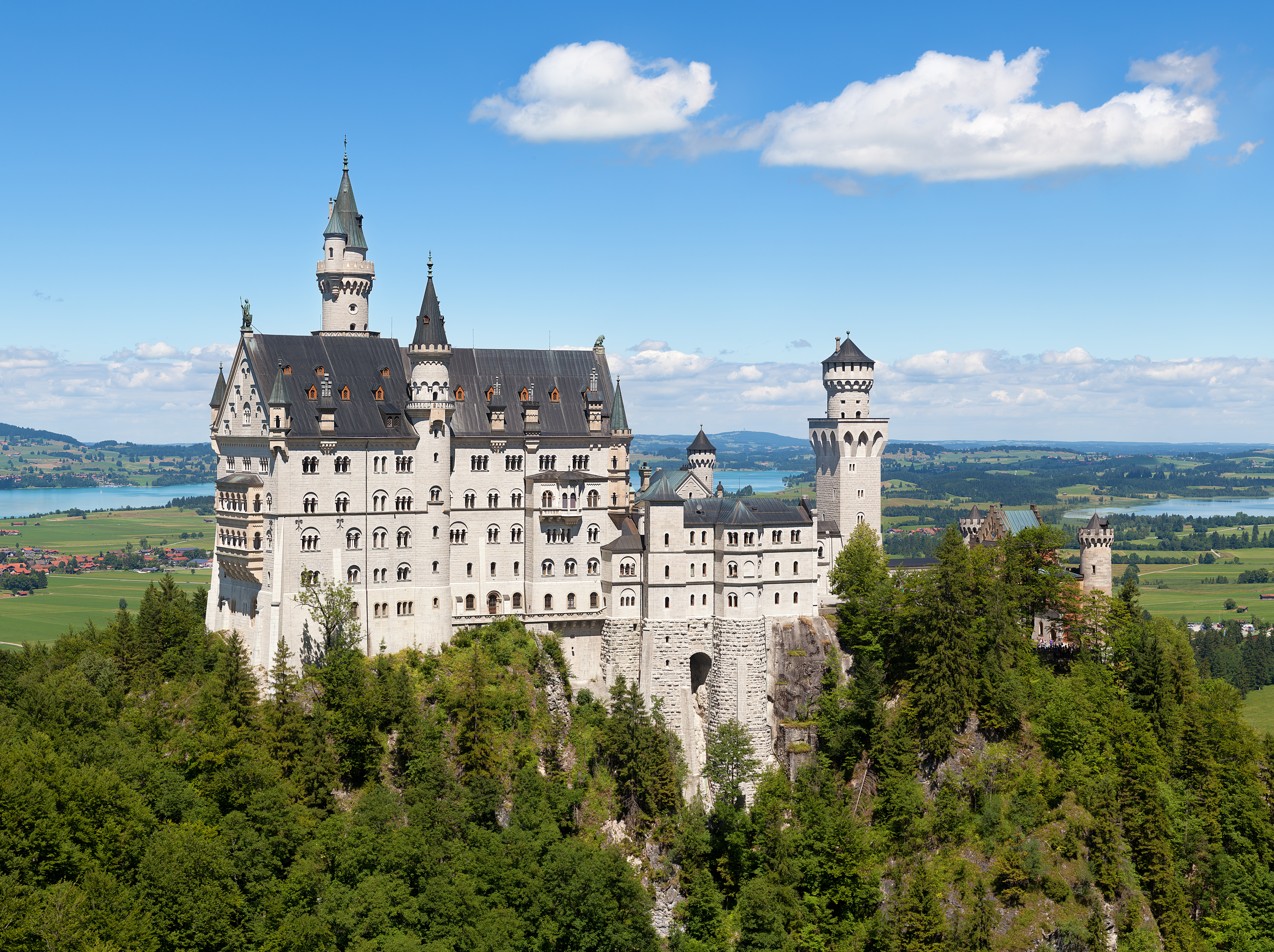
The German Neuschwanstein Castle, on which the Eyrie is based

Based on the German castle of Neuschwanstein, the Eyrie is the seat of House Arryn. It is situated on the Giant's Lance and reachable only by a narrow mule trail, guarded by the Gates of the Moon and three small castles, titled Stone, Snow, and Sky. Travelers must enter the Gates of the Moon and its upper bailey before reaching the narrow path up the mountain. The steps up the Giant's Lance starts directly behind the Gates of the Moon. The Eyrie clings to the mountain and is six hundred feet above Sky. The last part of the climb to the Eyrie is something of a cross between a chimney and a stone ladder, which leads to the Eyrie's cellar entrance.

The Eyrie is the smallest of the great castles in the story, consisting of seven slim towers bunched tightly together. It has no stables, kennels, or smithies, but the towers can house 500 men, and the granary can sustain a small household for a year or more. The Eyrie does not keep livestock on hand; all dairy produce, meats, fruits, vegetables, etc., must be brought from the Vale below. Its cellars hold six great winches with long iron chains to draw supplies and occasionally guests from below. Oxen are used to raise and lower them. Winter snows can make supplying the fortress impossible. The Eyrie's dungeons, known as "sky cells", are left open to the sky on one side and have sloping floors that put prisoners in danger of slipping or rolling off the edge. Executions in the Eyrie are carried out via the Moon Door, which opens from the high hall onto a 600-foot drop.

The Eyrie is made of pale stone and primarily decorated with the blue and white colors of House Arryn. Elegant details provide warmth and comfort through plentiful fireplaces, carpets, and luxurious fabrics. Many of the chambers have been described to be warm and comfortable, with magnificent views of the Vale, the Mountains of the Moon, or the waterfall. The Maiden's Tower is the easternmost of the seven slender towers, so all the Vale can be seen from its windows and balconies. The apartments of the Lady of the Eyrie open over a small garden planted with blue flowers and ringed by white towers, containing grass and scattered statuary, with the central statue of a weeping woman believed to be Alyssa Arryn, around low, flowering shrubs. The lord's chambers have doors of solid oak, and plush velvet curtains covering windows of small rhomboid panes of glass. The High Hall has a blue silk carpet leading to the carved weirwood thrones of the Lord and Lady Arryn. The floors and walls are of milk-white marble veined with blue. Daylight enters down through high narrow arched windows along the eastern wall, and there are some fifty high iron sconces where torches may be lit.

The Eyrie was held by Lord Jon Arryn, who fostered Ned Stark and Robert Baratheon prior to Robert's Rebellion (also known as the War of the Usurper). After the war, Lord Arryn served as King Robert I Baratheon's Hand of the King (prime minister). After Lord Arryn was assassinated, his wife, Lady Lysa Arryn, took her sickly child, Robert, and fled to the Eyrie. Lysa refused to align herself with any of the claimants during the War of the Five Kings, but eventually pretends to a possible alliance with House Lannister after Lord Petyr Baelish agrees to marry her. Later Baelish kills Lysa after she attempts to murder her niece, Sansa Stark. As of Feast for Crows, Baelish rules in the Eyrie as the Lord Protector and Regent for the sickly, epileptic Lord Robert "Robin" Arryn, and plans for Sansa to marry Harold Harding, who will become heir to the Eyrie and the Vale in the event of young Robin Arryn's death.

For the CGI compositions of the Vale of Arryn in the TV series, as seen in the establishing shot of the Eyrie and from the sky cells, the visual effects team used images and textures from the Greek rock formations of Meteora. Initially they had been considering the Zhangjiajie Mountains in China, but because the landscape base plates were shot in Northern Ireland, using Meteora resulted in a better option. Set designer Gemma Jackson said, "A lot of the mosaics in the Eyrie were based on a beautiful chapel I visited in Rome." The interior of the High Hall of the Arryns was filmed at The Paint Hall, occupying one of the four soundstages there. Martin acknowledged that the set differed significantly from its presentation in the books: "In the books, the room is long and rectangular. But [The Paint Hall soundstage] had essentially a square space, which they chose to put a round hall in, with a staircase curving up to a throne that was high above."

==== Gulltown ====
Gulltown is a port city located within the Bay of Crabs in southeastern Vale of Arryn. It is the largest settlement in the Vale, and the fourth-largest of the five major cities of the Seven Kingdoms. The city is ruled by House Grafton, and also contains a cadet branch of House Arryn.

=== The Westerlands ===
The Westerlands are the Westerosi lands to the west of the Riverlands and north of the Reach. They are ruled by House Lannister of Casterly Rock, formerly Kings of the Rock. People of this region are often called "Westermen." Lannisport, lying hard by Casterly Rock, is the chief town of the region and one of the great ports and cities of Westeros. The Westerlands are rich in precious metals, mostly gold, which is the source of their wealth. Keeping with Westerosi customs to give bastards a surname showing their origins, illegitimate children born in the Westerlands are given the surname Hill.

==== Casterly Rock ====
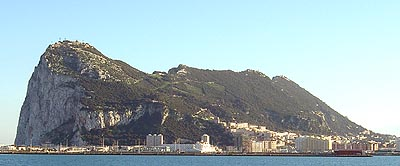
Casterly Rock was inspired by the Rock of Gibraltar.

A stronghold carved from a mountain overlooking the harbor city of Lannisport and the sea beyond, Casterly Rock is the ancestral seat of House Lannister. According to popular legend, the hero known as Lann the Clever tricked the Casterlys into giving up the Rock, and took it for himself. The Rock is renowned as the wealthiest region due to its abundance of gold deposits, and it is one of the strongest castles of the Seven Kingdoms as it's a completely hollowed out mountain taller than even the Wall. It has never been taken in battle, despite attacks by the Iron Islanders and the plans of Robb Stark in the War of the Five Kings. It was held by Lord Tywin Lannister before the War of the Five Kings, but after his death, Queen Regent Cersei Lannister made one of her cousins castellan of the castle. As of A Dance with Dragons, the narrative has not actually taken place in Casterly Rock, yet descriptions of it have been offered by the Lannisters in the POV chapters.

George R. R. Martin stated on his blog that he drew inspiration for Casterly Rock from the Rock of Gibraltar.

==== Lannisport ====
Closely south of Casterly Rock is the coastal city of Lannisport, the third-largest of the five major cities of the Seven Kingdoms. A busy port under the governance of the Lannisters of Casterly Rock, Lannisport thrives as a protected and wealthy city. The city is also home to many lesser Lannisters and other distant cousins with similar surnames, such as Lannys.

=== The Reach ===
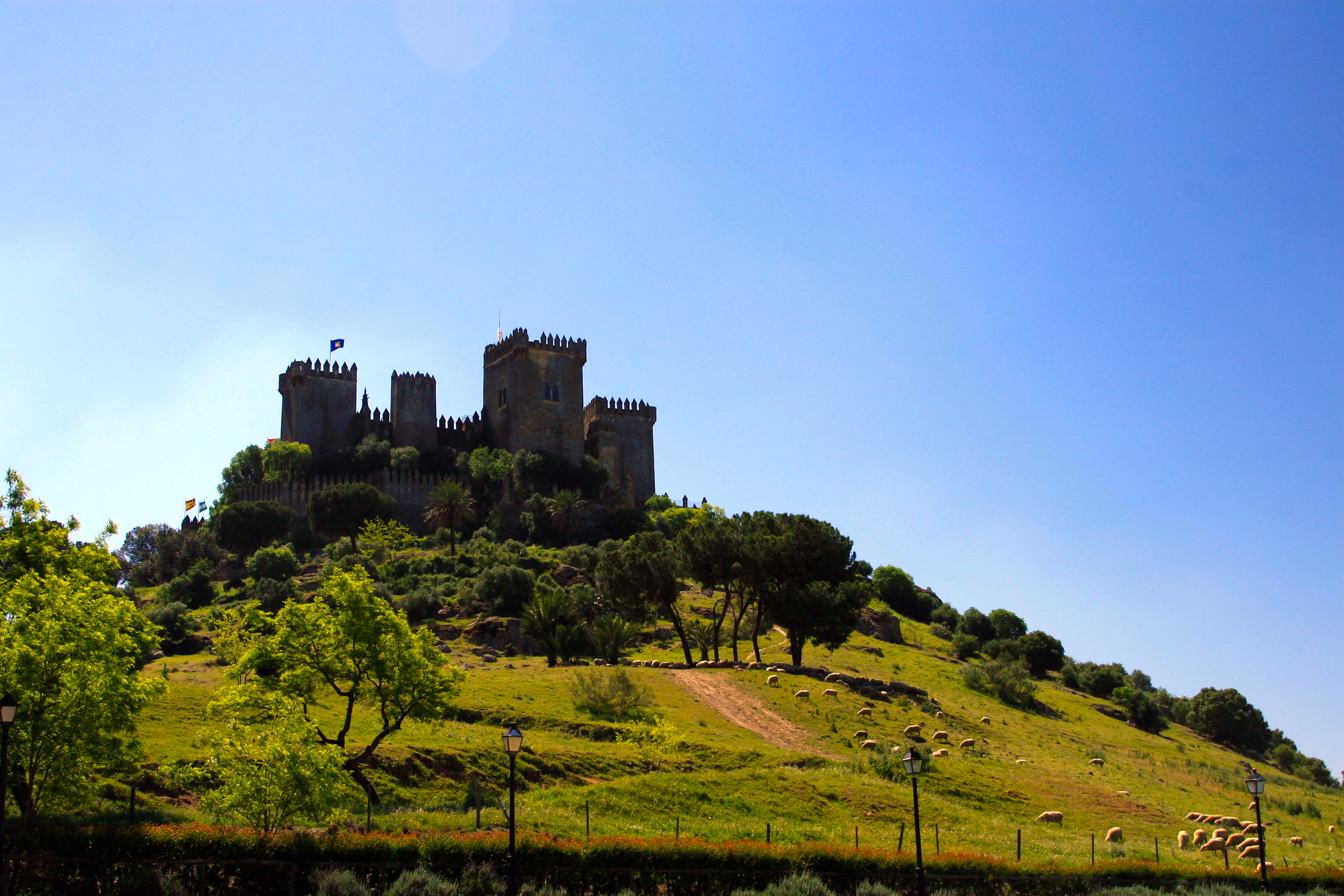
The Castle of Almodóvar del Río in Córdoba, Spain, which represented Highgarden in Game of Thrones

The Reach is the southwestern region of Westeros along the valleys of the Mander (the largest river in Westeros) and the Honeywine. It is the second-largest of the kingdoms in terms of geographical area (behind only the North) and is the most fertile and heavily populated region of Westeros. The wealth and power of the Reach comes from its warm, sunny climate, which grants bountiful harvests of farm foods and the most sought-after wines. During times of war, the expansive lands of the Reach and its abundance of foods protects their inhabitants from initial famine and sickness. The Reach is considered the home of chivalry in Westeros, and is the place where knighthood is looked upon with the greatest reverence, and where the rules for tourneys are the most stringent and managed. The most prominent population center in the Reach is Oldtown, Westeros's oldest and second largest city and port as well as the home to the Maesters' Citadel and the former religious seat of the Faith of the Seven, situated at the mouth of the Honeywine estuary.

The Reach was historically known as the Green Realm, ruled by King of the Reach from House Gardener in Highgarden. During Aegon's conquest, the last Gardener King, Mern IX, was killed along with all his heirs and kins on the Field of Fire. House Tyrell, the stewards to House Gardener, surrendered Highgarden to Aegon and were rewarded with both the castle and the position of overlords of the Reach. Illegitimate children born in the Reach are given the surname Flowers.

During the reign of House Baratheon as the ruler of Westeros, the Reach is the second wealthiest region in the Seven Kingdom, behind only the mine-rich Westerlands. During the War of the Five Kings, in a significant political maneuver during the civil war, House Tyrell provides the starving populace of King's Landing with hundreds of carts of food, ensuring the positive image of House Tyrell foremost, and the alliance for the Iron Throne with House Baratheon as secondary. However, the Tyrells were responsible for the starvation in the first place, as part of their plan to help the pretender Renly Baratheon contend for the Iron Throne.

==== Oldtown ====
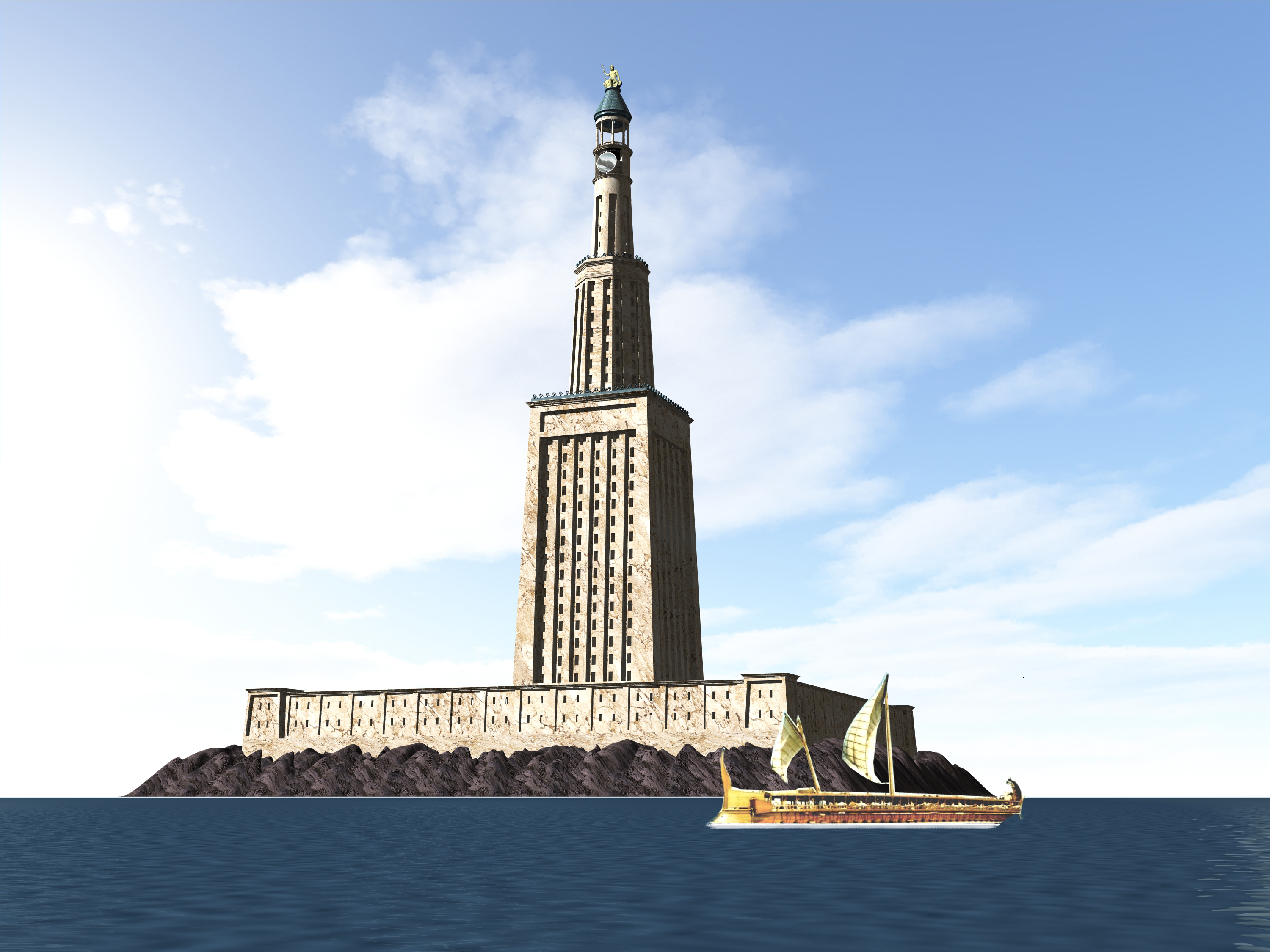
The Hightower of Oldtown bears similarities to the Lighthouse of Alexandria (3D reconstruction pictured)

Oldtown is one of the largest cities in Westeros and is by far the oldest, built by the First Men before the Andal Invasion. It survived the invasion by welcoming the Andals rather than resisting them. The city is located in the southwestern part of Westeros, at the mouth of the River Honeywine, where it opens onto Whispering Sound and the Sunset Sea beyond.

Oldtown is primarily known as the location of the Citadel, home of the order of Maesters who serve as councillors, doctors, scientists, and postmasters for the Seven Kingdoms. The city's Starry Sept was the seat of the Faith of the Seven until the construction of the Great Sept of Baelor in King's Landing. Aegon the Conqueror's reign is dated from his entrance into the city of Oldtown and his acknowledgment as king by the High Septon.

Oldtown is the second most important port in the Seven Kingdoms after King's Landing: trading ships from the Summer Islands, the Free Cities, the eastern cities, and the rest of Westeros constantly crowd into its harbors. The city itself is described as stunningly beautiful with a warm climate. Many rivers and canals crisscross its cobbled streets, and breathtaking stone mansions are common. The city lacks the squalor of King's Landing, which usurped its position as the preeminent city of Westeros.

The largest structure in the city, and the tallest structure in Westeros, is the Hightower, a massive stepped lighthouse which extends some 800 feet (240 m) into the sky and is topped by a huge beacon which can be seen for many miles out to sea. Oldtown is ruled from the Hightower by House Hightower. Originally kings in their own right, they later swore fealty to the Gardeners of Highgarden, and became vassals of the Tyrells after the Conquest. The Hightowers are known for their loyalty and stalwartness. The current ruler of the city is Lord Leyton Hightower.

Oldtown remained aloof from the War of the Five Kings, but late in the war the Ironborn under King Euron Greyjoy launched a massive raid along the coast, conquering the Shield Islands and parts of the Arbor before trying to blockade the mouth of the Honeywine. An attempt to attack the city harbor was repulsed by the city's defenders. Oldtown remains under threat from the Ironborn.

=== The Stormlands ===
The Stormlands are the large cape between the Blackwater Bay and the Sea of Dorne and the cape's associated western hinterlands, named for the severe weathers in the coastal areas. The region is bordered in the east by the Narrow Sea, especially a large semi-enclosed bay known as the Shipbreaker Bay behind the island of Tarth; from King's Landing and the Crownlands in the north by a large forest known as the Kingswood; from the Reach in the west by the headwaters of the Mander River; and Dorne in the south by the expansive Red Mountains. The southwestern Stormlands are a borderland area historically contested among the Stormlands, the Reach and Dorne, known as the Dornish Marches.

Before Aegon's conquest, the Stormlands were ruled by the Storm Kings of House Durrandon founded by the legendary Durran Godsgrief. When Aegon the Conqueror invaded Westeros, his bastard half-brother Orys Baratheon slew the last Storm King in a duel and married the latter's daughter to establish House Baratheon, which has ruled the Stormlands as lord paramount afterwards. Highborn illegitimate children born in the Stormlands are given the surname Storm.

==== Storm's End ====
Storm's End is the seat of House Baratheon and, before them, the ancestral seat of the Storm Kings extending back many thousands of years. According to legend, the first Storm King in the age of the First Men was Durran, who married Elenei, the daughter of the sea god and the goddess of the wind. In a rage her parents sent vast storms to shatter his keep and kill his wedding guests and family; whereupon Durran declared war against the gods and raised several castles over Shipbreaker Bay, each larger and more formidable than the last. Finally, the seventh castle stayed in place and resisted the storms. Some believe the Children of the Forest took a hand in its construction; others suggest that Brandon Stark, the builder of the Wall, advised Durran on its construction. The truth of the matter is unknown.

Storm's End has never fallen to either siege or storm. Its outer defenses consist of a huge curtain wall, 100 feet (30 m) tall and 40 feet (12 m) thick on its thinnest side, nearly 80 feet (24 m) thick on its seaward side. The wall consists of a double course of stones with an inner core of sand and rubble. The wall is smooth and curving, the stones so well placed that the wind cannot enter. On the seaward side, there is a 150-foot (46 m) drop below the wall into the sea.

The castle itself consists of one huge drum tower crowned with formidable battlements, and so large that it can comfortably contain stables, barracks, armory and lord's chambers in the same structure. Although never taken in battle, Storm's End has endured several sieges and battles in recent history. The last Storm King, Argilac the Arrogant, abandoned his impressive defenses to meet the Targaryen commander, Orys Baratheon, in open battle during Aegon Targaryen's War of Conquest, and lost. This led to Orys Baratheon marrying Argilac's daughter and becoming Lord of Storm's End.

During the War of the Usurper, Storm's End was besieged for a year by the host of Lord Mace Tyrell, who commanded the landward forces, while Paxter Redwyne's fleet of the Arbor kept the castle cut off by sea. Stannis Baratheon, commanding the defense, refused to yield and his men were reduced to eating rats. A smuggler named Davos ran the blockade to resupply the castle and Stannis rewarded him by knighting him and giving him lands, thus founding House Seaworth, but he also cut off the fingertips of his left hand as punishment for all his previous smuggling. After the war, Stannis was furious when his brother Robert, now king, gave the castle to their younger brother Renly and placed Stannis in command of Dragonstone. This led to many years of bitterness on Stannis' part.

During the War of the Five Kings, Storm's End supported Renly when he attempted to usurp the crown, and was besieged by Stannis. When the castellan, Cortnay Penrose, refused to yield even after Renly's death, he was killed by Stannis' ally, the priestess Melisandre, and the castle surrendered. Later, the castle was besieged by a strong army under Mace Tyrell, but he abandoned the siege after a few weeks to return to King's Landing after the arrest of his daughter Margaery by the High Septon. As of A Dance with Dragons, the castle remains in the hands of Stannis Baratheon.

At the end of A Dance with Dragons an army lands in the Stormlands led by Jon Connington and a young man claiming to be Aegon Targaryen, the son of Rhaegar Targaryen and Elia Martell and heir to the Iron Throne. To attract support, Aegon plans to conquer Storm's End and raise the banner of House Targaryen above the battlements.

In the TV adaptation, scenes in the Stormlands were filmed in Larrybane, Northern Ireland. The scene where Stannis' red priestess Melisandre gave birth to a shadow creature was filmed in the Cushendun Caves, also in Northern Ireland.

=== The Crownlands ===
The Crownlands are the lands in Westeros surrounding King's Landing, ruled directly by the crown of the Iron Throne. The Targaryen kings consolidated this as one of the nine regions of Westeros, after their conquest of the Seven Kingdoms, from sparsely populated pieces of the Riverlands and Stormlands. The Crownlands form the entire coastline of Blackwater Bay, and include the original Targaryen homeland on the island of Dragonstone, at the Narrow Sea entrance to Blackwater Bay. Besides King's Landing, which is the largest city in Westeros, the Crownlands include many towns and castles. The illegitimate children born in the Crownlands are given the surname Waters.

==== Dragonstone ====
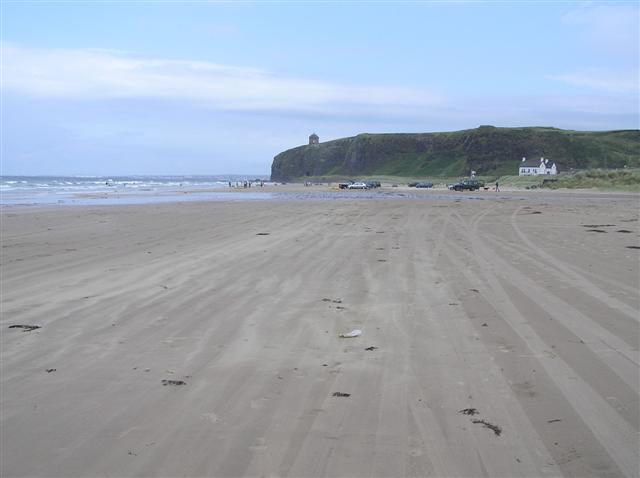
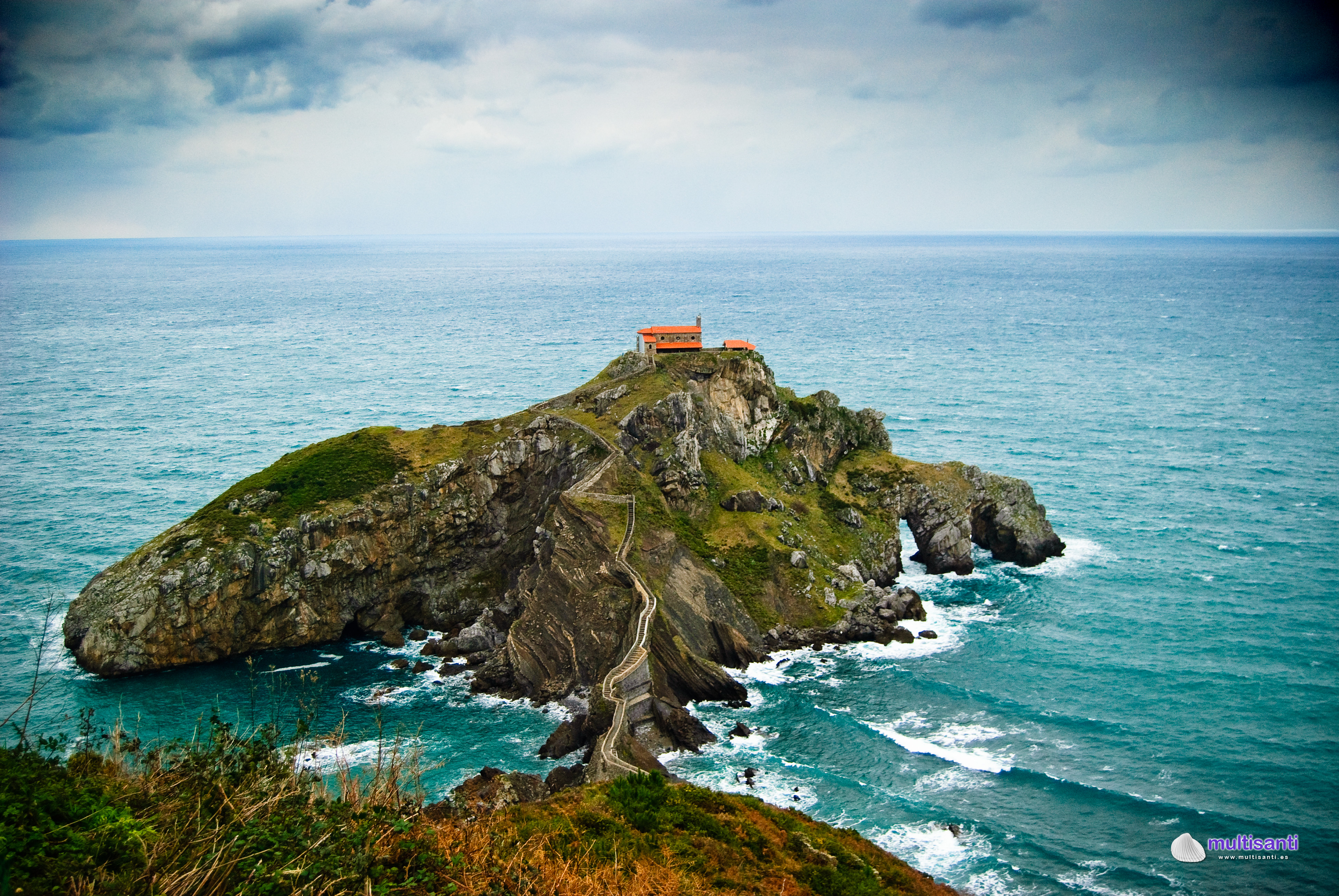
Downhill Strand, County Londonderry was used to represent a beach of the island of Dragonstone (left) and Gaztelugatxe in the Basque Country, Spain (right) stood in for Dragonstone in Season 7.

Dragonstone was once the westernmost outpost of the ancient Freehold of Valyria. A century before the Doom, the Targaryen family moved to Dragonstone. When the Doom came upon Valyria, House Targaryen survived along with the last of the Valyrian dragons. Another century later, Aegon Targaryen and his sisters Rhaenys and Visenya launched a massive campaign of conquest from the island and eventually conquered all of Westeros except for Dorne, and North of the Wall. Aegon's progeny reigned as kings of the Seven Kingdoms for centuries, Dragonstone being the seat of the heir apparent to the Iron Throne.

Dragonstone is a massive, forbidding fortress, taking up a large portion of the island of the same name. The castle is unique in that the builders and sorcerers of Valyria carved its towers and keeps into the shapes of dragons and made ferocious gargoyles to cover its walls using both magic and masonry. The castle's lower levels are warmed by residual volcanic activity deep below the keep. There is a small port and town outside of the castle. Additionally, in a cave at the beachfront of the castle, huge deposits of Dragonglass can be found.

During the War of the Usurper, before the sack of King's Landing, the Targaryen Queen Rhaella, who was pregnant, and her son Viserys were sent to Dragonstone along with part of the Targaryen fleet and a garrison of loyal soldiers. But after King's Landing fell, Robert Baratheon dispatched his brother Stannis to take the island stronghold. After a storm destroyed the royalist fleet, the Targaryen garrison tried to betray Viserys and his newborn sister, Daenerys, to Stannis (the queen had died in childbirth). But Targaryen loyalists led by Ser Willem Darry took the children away. Stannis conquered Dragonstone easily, and King Robert granted him ownership of the castle. Stannis felt slighted because his younger brother Renly then inherited Storm's End, the ancient seat of House Baratheon. Ser Axell Florent, one of the uncles of Stannis' wife Selyse Florent, acted as castellan.

Upon Robert's death, Stannis declared himself king of the Seven Kingdoms and condemned the queen's children as bastards born of incest, as he had discovered with Jon Arryn. Dragonstone became his main seat. He returned there after the disastrous Battle of the Blackwater. His councilor, the red priestess Melisandre of Asshai, tried to convince him to let her raise the "stone dragon" of the castle through blood magic, but Lord Davos Seaworth convinced Stannis to go north to the Wall to help the Night's Watch instead. After Stannis abandoned Dragonstone, leaving the Bastard of Nightsong Rolland Storm as castellan, Queen Regent Cersei Lannister dispatched a fleet to barricade it. However, Ser Loras Tyrell, impatient to free the fleet to protect his home castle of Highgarden, attacked Dragonstone directly. He took the castle but lost a thousand men and was himself reportedly gravely wounded. As of A Dance with Dragons, Dragonstone is now controlled by troops loyal to House Tyrell, and theoretically, once again under the control of the Iron Throne.

One scene set at Dragonstone, in which Stannis burns wooden sculptures of the Seven gods, was filmed at the beach of Downhill Strand. In Season 7 of the show, filming for Dragonstone took place at several locations in the Basque region of Spain: the islet of Gaztelugatxe in Bermeo, Itzurun Beach in Zumaia, and Muriola Beach in Barrika.

==== King's Landing ====
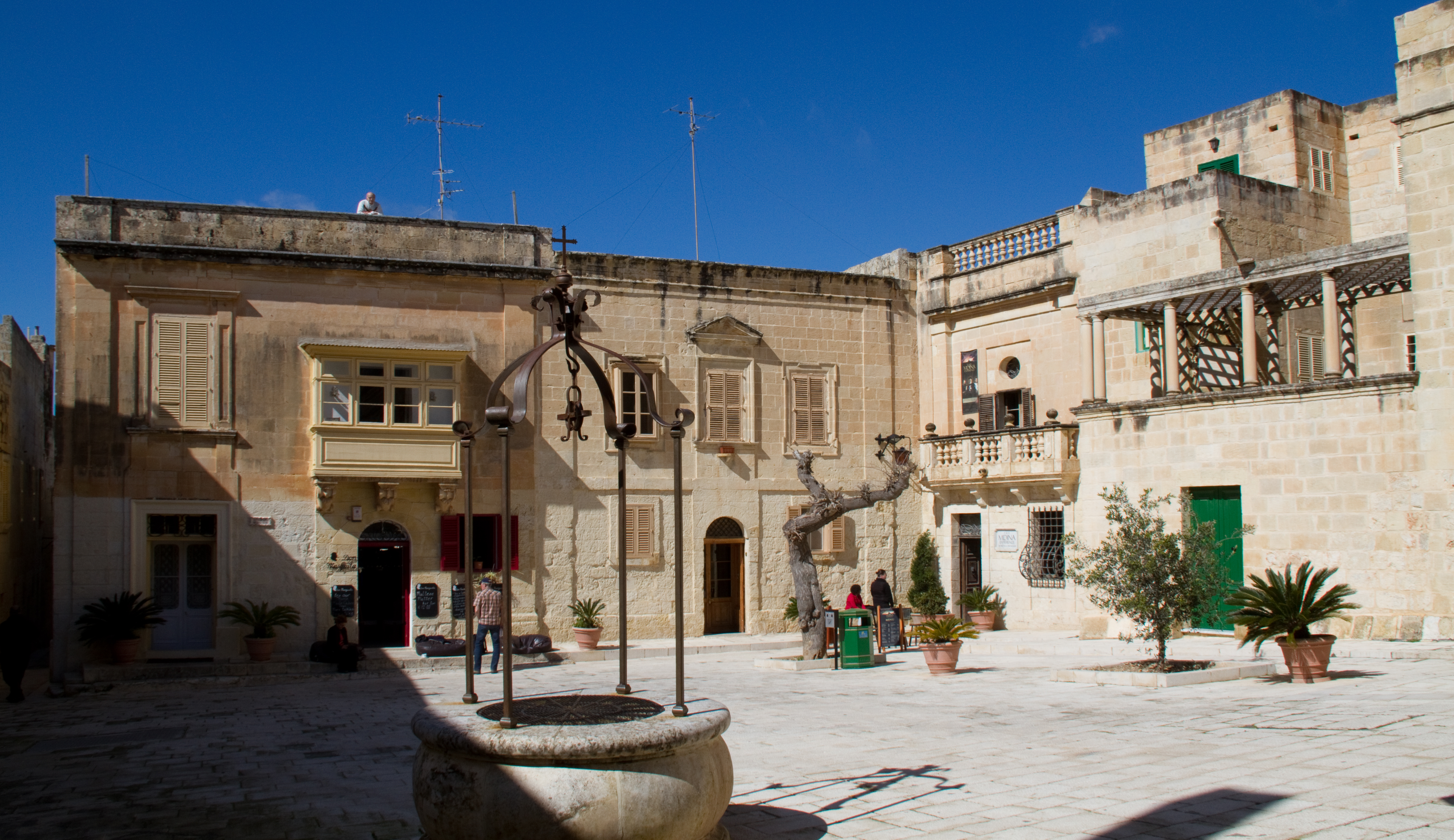
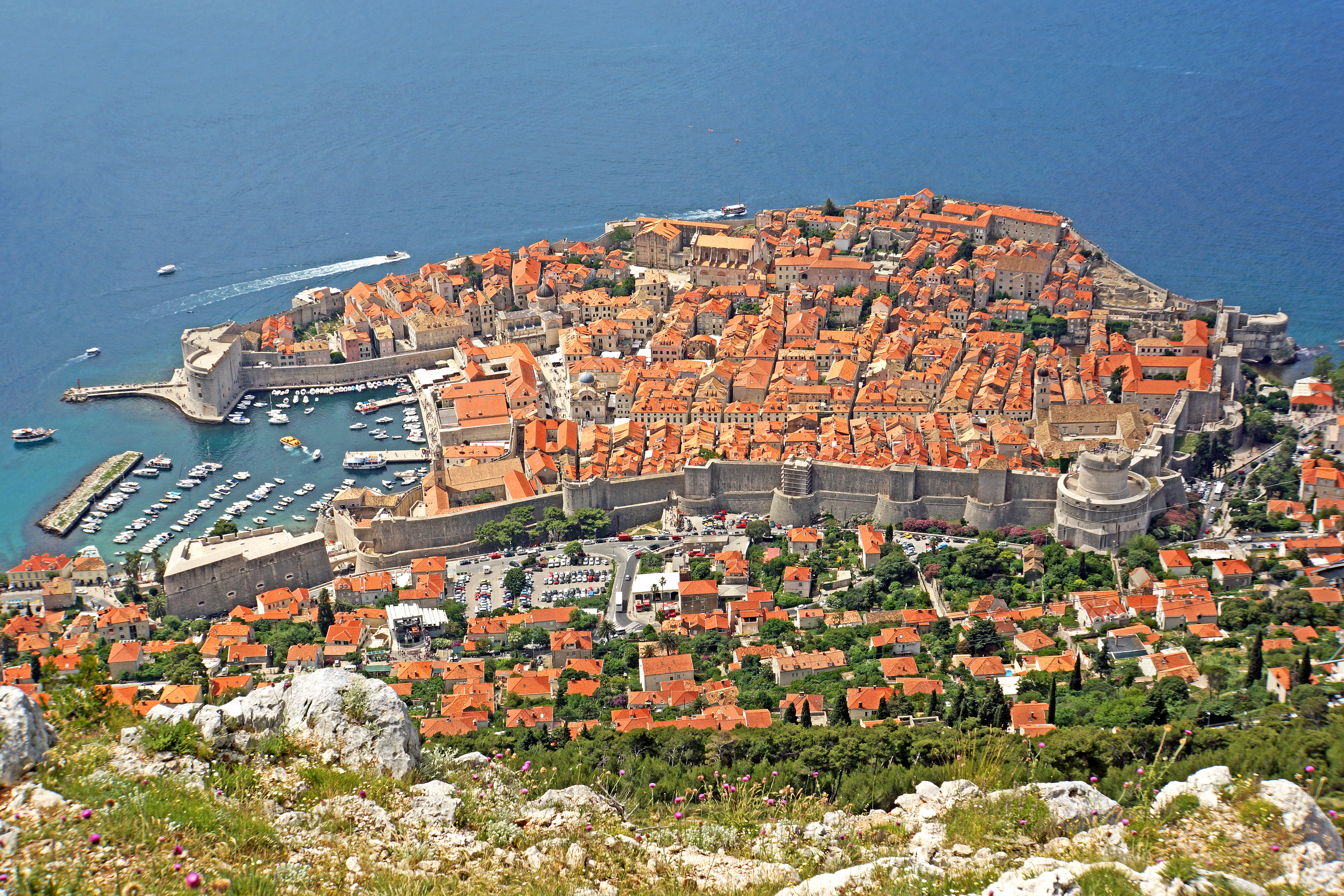
Mdina in Malta (top) and Dubrovnik in Croatia (bottom) stood in for King's Landing in the TV adaptation.

King's Landing is the royal capital of Westeros and the Seven Kingdoms. King's Landing has an estimated population of half a million people, making it the most populous city in Westeros. It is situated on the Blackwater river on the spot where Aegon the Conqueror landed in Westeros to begin his conquest. The main city is surrounded by a wall, which is manned by the City Watch of King's Landing, which is nicknamed the gold cloaks, after the cloaks they wear. Within the walls, the city's natural landscape is dominated by three hills, named after Aegon and his two sister-wives Rhaenys and Visenya. Poorer smallfolk (commoners) build shanty settlements outside the city. King's Landing is described as extremely populous but unsightly and dirty. The stench of the city's waste can be smelled far beyond its walls and there is a vast divide between the city's poor and the wealthy elite.

The royal castle, called the Red Keep, sits on Aegon's Hill. It is the seat of the royal court. The Keep holds the Iron Throne. Aegon commissioned the throne's construction from the swords of his defeated enemies. According to legend, he kept the blades sharp because he believed that no ruler should ever sit comfortably. Centuries later, kings still cut themselves on the throne. It is a common belief that one who cuts himself on the throne has been "rejected" by the throne and is therefore not fit to rule.

The city also holds the Great Sept of Baelor, where the Most Devout convene with the High Septon. It is the holiest sept of the Seven. Since the city was built in a rush, most of it is made of slums called Flea Bottom, where residents are so poor they regularly subsist on "bowls of brown", a mystery stew that can include the meat of puppies and murder victims. King's Landing has a temperate, mediterranean climate with long, warm, sunny summers and mild winters although snow does occasionally occur.

Martin compared King's Landing to medieval Paris or London. It was inspired by the view of Staten Island from his childhood home in Bayonne, New Jersey. (Note: "World News with Diane Sawyer : WN 4/18: Games of Thrones Author Georg…". ABC World News Tonight. April 18, 2014.)

The first season of the TV adaptation used Malta's former capital Mdina to represent King's Landing. "Like King's Landing, Mdina is a walled medieval city built upon a hill, but unlike King's Landing, Mdina is an inland city – so the production was limited to interior shots such as side streets and the town gate, which can be seen when Ned Stark arrives. Nearby Fort Manoel doubled as the great Sept of Baelor," which can be seen when Ned Stark is executed. Various other locations around Malta represent the Red Keep, "including the real-life residence of the president of Malta, San Anton Palace. The gates of Fort Ricasoli doubled as the Red Keep's gates; Fort St. Angelo was used for the scenes of Arya Stark chasing cats; and St. Dominic monastery stood in for the scene where Ned Stark confronts Cersei Lannister in the godswood."

"In season two, filming for King's Landing and the Red Keep shifted from Malta to the historic parts of Dubrovnik and the Minčeta, Bokar, and Lovrijenac fortresses in Croatia, which allowed for more exterior shots of an authentic walled medieval city." Parts of Season three were filmed there, too, as well as in nearby Trsteno. "Known as the Pearl of the Adriatic, the city proved to share many characteristics with the fictional capital: it had a well-preserved medieval look, with high walls and the sea at its side. According to David Benioff, executive producer of the show, "King's Landing might be the single most important location in the entire show, and it has to look right", and "The minute we started walking around the city walls we knew that was it. You read the descriptions in the book and you come to Dubrovnik and that's what the actual city is. It has the sparkling sea, sun and beautiful architecture." Co-Executive Producer D.B. Weiss added "To find a full-on, immaculately preserved medieval walled city that actually looks uncannily like King's Landing where the bulk of our show is set, that was in and of itself such an amazing find". The Tourney of the Hand in season 1 was filmed in Shane's Castle, Northern Ireland.

The Red Keep interior are filmed at Belfast's studio The Paint Hall. Set designer Gemma Jackson said, "When I was thinking about King's Landing, the whole red aspect of it, that immediately made me think of Rajasthan. The floor [at King's Landing] was from the Pantheon in Rome." Martin said that "Our throne room is a spectacular throne room – we actually redressed a throne room built for [another] film. And again, it occupied a quarter of the Paint Hall, so it's very big, but in my mind [in the books], it's Westminster Abbey, it's St. Paul's Cathedral."

=== Dorne ===
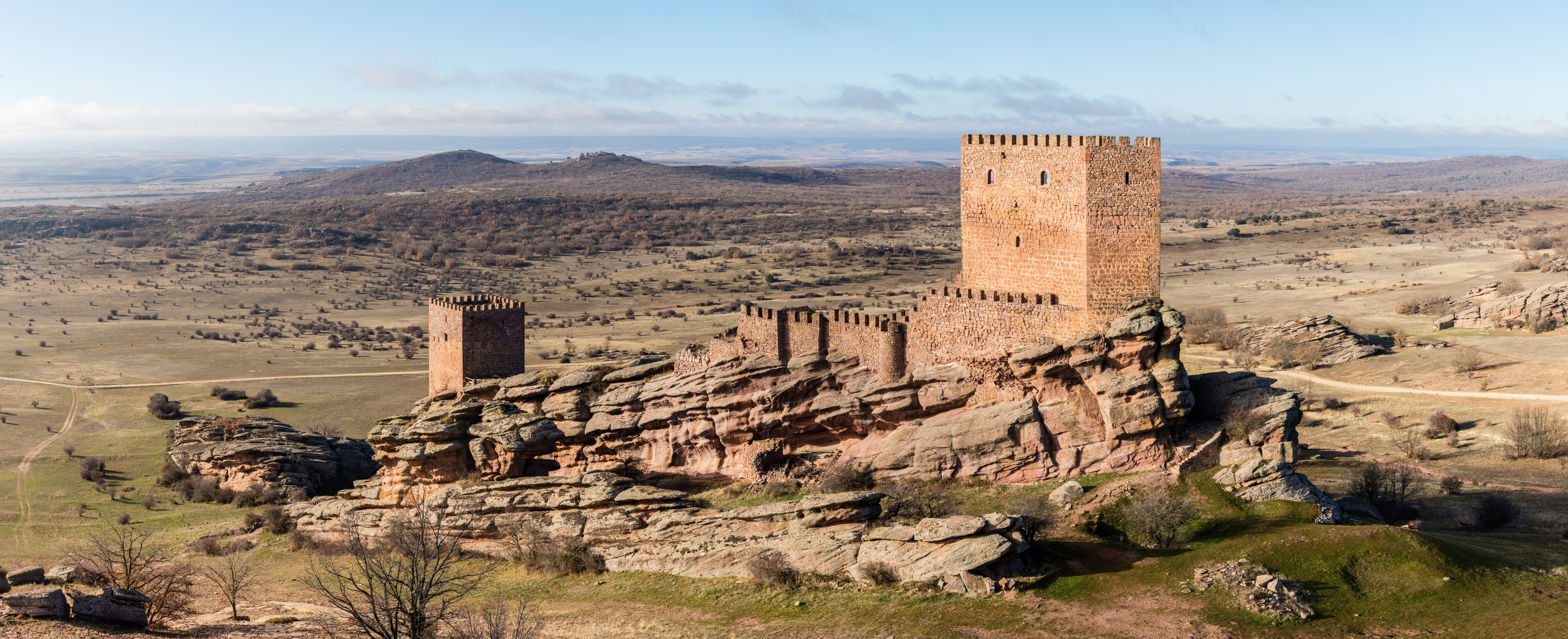
The Castle of Zafra in Guadalajara, Spain, which portrayed the Tower of Joy in Dorne in Game of Thrones

Dorne is the southernmost and least populated land of Westeros. The capital, Sunspear, is the seat of the ruling House Martell. As of the first five books, Doran Nymeros Martell is the Prince of Dorne and Lord of Sunspear. Doran's sister, Princess Elia, was married in a political alliance to Prince Rhaegar Targaryen, the Prince of Dragonstone and heir to the Iron Throne. They had two children, a daughter, Rhaenys, and a son, Aegon. During the Sack of King's Landing at the end of Robert's Rebellion, Princess Elia was raped and murdered by Gregor Clegane, a House Lannister bannerman (vassal). Her children were also killed in front of her. Prince Doran and his wife, Princess Mellaria, have three children, Arianne, Quentyn and Trystane. During the War of the Five Kings, Tyrion Lannister, as Hand of the King, turns the historical enmity of House Martell and Lannister into an alliance by sending King Joffrey's middle sibling and sister, Myrcella Baratheon, as the betrothed future bride to Trystane, the youngest child of Prince Doran, who is about her own age. The eldest child of Prince Doran, Arianne, is heir to House Martell, Sunspear and the rule of Dorne. The wealth of Dorne comes from their famous Sand Steeds, purebred horses of endurance, speed, and grace, and from spices, wines, fishing, fabrics, and textiles.

Dorne is bordered by the Sea of Dorne to the north, the islands known as the Stepstones to the east, and stretches from the high mountains of the Dornish marches, the Red Mountains, separating Dorne from the remainder of the Seven Kingdoms by land. The two major passes through the Red Mountains that connect Dorne with the rest of the continent are the Stone Way Pass and the Prince's Pass. The Prince's Pass leads to the Reach, while the Stone Way exits the mountains near Summerhall. The southern coast of the continent is bordered by the Summer Sea. Described as tropical in climate by George R. R. Martin, Dorne has the highest temperatures of any kingdom in Westeros, and is arid, with a rocky, mountainous, terrain that includes the only desert on the continent. Its rivers provide some fertile lands and during a long summer there is enough rain and other supplies of water to keep Dorne habitable. Inland water is almost as valuable as gold, and wells are jealously guarded. Notable locations of Dorne are Starfall, the seat of House Dayne, and Yronwood, the seat of House Yronwood, the most powerful of the Martell bannermen. Planky Town is a trade port town at the mouth of the River Greenblood.

Dornishmen have a reputation for hot-bloodedness. They differ both culturally and ethnically from other Westerosi due to the historical mass immigration of Rhoynish people. They have adopted many Rhoynish customs as well, including equal primogeniture. Dorne was the only kingdom in Westeros to successfully resist Aegon's conquest, even killing one of his dragons during the war. It was conquered by Daeron I over a century after the Targaryen invasion, but rose against him leading to his death. Finally under Daeron's cousin Daeron II they joined through marriage. This accomplishment has allowed Dorne to retain a measure of independence. Lords of the ruling House Martell still style themselves "Prince" and "Princess" in the Rhoynish fashion. Unlike most of the rest of Westeros, illegitimate children born in Dorne are treated nearly the same as legal offspring and given the surname Sand, as with Westerosi customs to give bastards a surname showing their origins.

According to A Storm of Swords, "There were three sorts of Dornishmen [...]. There were the salty Dornishmen who lived along the coasts, the sandy Dornishmen of the deserts and long river valleys, and the stony Dornishmen who made their fastnesses in the passes and heights of the Red Mountains. The salty Dornishmen had the most Rhoynish blood, the stony Dornishmen the least. All three sorts seemed well represented in Doran’s retinue. The salty Dornishmen were lithe and dark, with smooth olive skin and long black hair streaming in the wind. The sandy Dornishmen were even darker, their faces burned brown by the hot Dornish sun. They wound long bright scarfs around their helms to ward off sunstroke. The stony Dornishmen were biggest and fairest, sons of the Andals and the First Men, brownhaired or blond, with faces that freckled or burned in the sun instead of browning."

In the show, Dornish scenes were filmed in the Alcázar of Seville, Seville, Spain.

=== The Wall ===
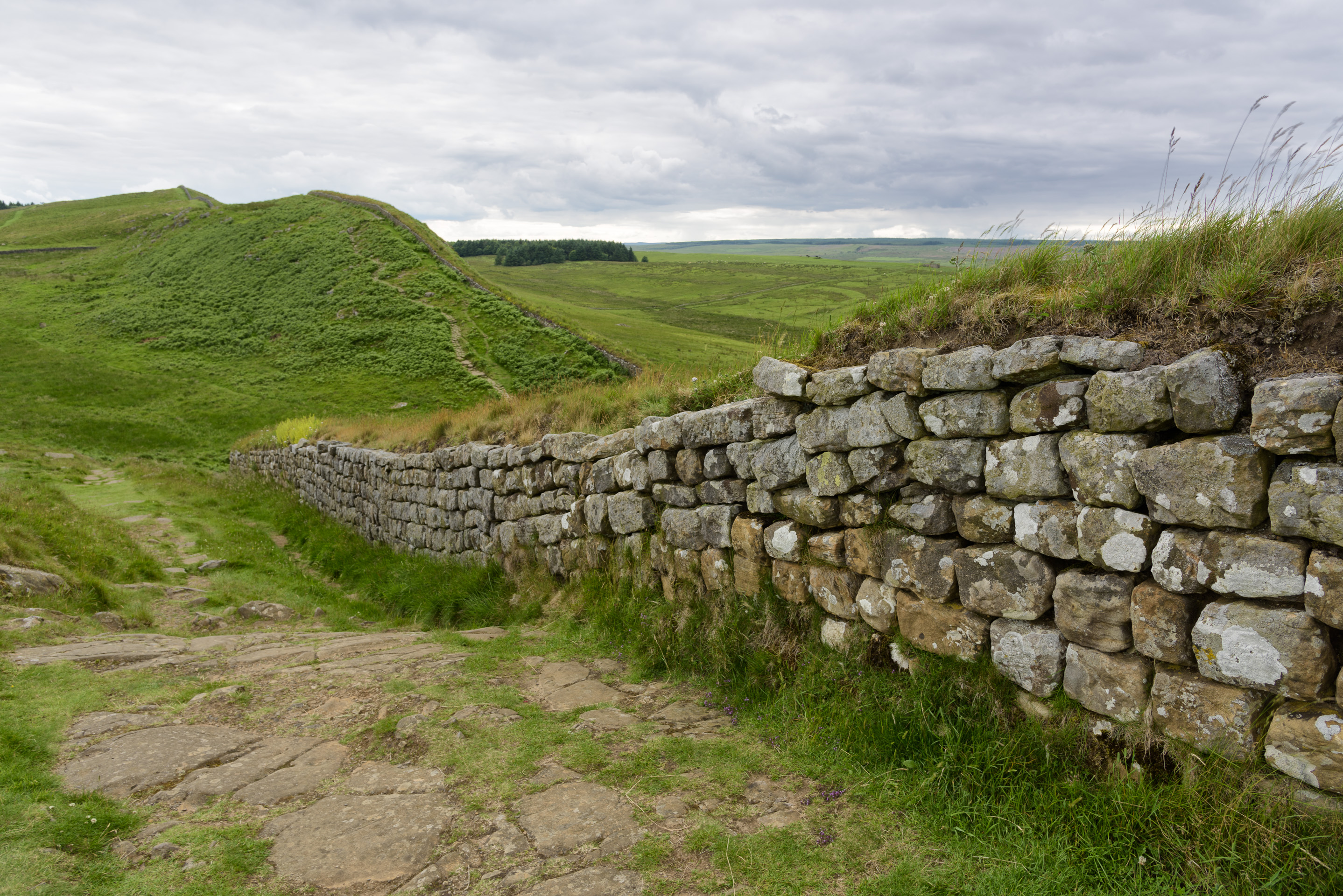
The Wall in the Ice and Fire series was inspired by Hadrian's Wall in the North of England.

The Wall is a huge 700-foot (210 m) tall structure made of stone and ice and infused with magic, which marked the northernmost border of the Seven Kingdoms. It is home to the Night's Watch, a brotherhood sworn to protect the realms of men from the threats beyond the Wall, who are given independent dominion in perpetuity over lands within fifty leagues (150 miles or 240 km) south of the Wall, known as the Gift. There are only two known settlements within the Gift, namely Mole's Town and Queenscrown, both located along the kingsroad.

A total of the nineteen castles were built along the south side of the Wall, but by A Game of Thrones only three are still garrisoned: Castle Black, Shadow Tower and Eastwatch-by-the-Sea, while the rest have long fallen into ruins. Castle Black, located at the middle of the Wall, is the Night's Watch's main headquarters and the northern terminus of the kingsroad, being defended by 600 men; while Shadow Tower and Eastwatch, located at the western and eastern ends of the Wall respectively, are garrisoned with about 200 men each. During the events of A Dance with Dragons, the 998th Lord Commander of the Night's Watch, Jon Snow, attempts to bolster the Wall's defense by re-garrisoning small detachments in all but two of the sixteen abandoned castles.

The novels' legends claim that the First Men, or more specifically Brandon the Builder, constructed the Wall some 8,000 years before the events of the series possibly with help of children of the forest and giants. The Wall has since been maintained by the Night's Watch to guard the realms of men against threats from the far north, originally by mystical beings known as the Others, and later against raids by wildlings from beyond the Wall.

The Wall was inspired by Martin's visit to Hadrian's Wall, in the North of England close to the border with Scotland. Looking out over the hills, Martin wondered what a Roman centurion from the Mediterranean would feel, not knowing what threats might come from the north. (Note: MacLaurin, Wayne (November 2000). "A Conversation With George R.R. Martin". SF Site. Archived from the original on January 11, 2012. (Interview approved by GRRM Archived February 4, 2012, at the Wayback Machine.)) This experience was so profound that a decade later, in 1991, he wanted to "write a story about the people guarding the end of the world", (Note: George R. R. Martin (March 12, 2012). In Conversation With... George R. R. Martin on Game of Thrones Part 1 – TIFF Bell Lightbox. TIFF Bell Lightbox. Event occurs at 13:00 min. Archived from the original on May 29, 2012 – via YouTube. Transcript summary available by Ippolito, Toni-Marie (March 13, 2012). "George R. R. Martin talks to fans about the making of Game of Thrones and what inspired his best-selling book series". thelifestylereport.ca. Archived from the original on April 4, 2012.) and ultimately "the things that come out of the [fictional] north are a good deal more terrifying than Scotsmen or Picts". Martin adjusted the size, length, and magical nature of the Wall for genre demands; Jon Snow's chapters describe it as approximately 300 miles (480 km) long and 700 feet (210 m) high in general, rising up to a perceived 900 feet (270 m) in spots due to huge foundation blocks. The top is wide enough for a dozen mounted knights to ride abreast (approximately 30 ft or 10 m), while the base is so thick that the Wall's gates are more like tunnels through the ice.

The TV series' Castle Black and the Wall were filmed in the abandoned Magheramorne Quarry near Belfast, Northern Ireland, whereas the scenes shot atop the wall were filmed inside Paint Hall Studios. The composite set (with both exteriors and interiors) consisted of a large section of Castle Black including the courtyard, the ravenry, the mess hall, and the barracks, and used the stone wall of the quarry as the basis for the ice wall that protects Westeros from the dangers that dwell beyond. They also made a functional elevator to lift the rangers to the top of the Wall. A castle with real rooms and a working elevator was built near a cliff 400 feet (120 m) high. "Working construction lifts were discovered at a nearby work site and rise 18 feet; CGI fills in the rest to make the wall appear 700 feet high." The area around the elevator was painted white to make it look like ice. Martin was surprised by the height and thought: "Oh I may have made the wall too big!" Martin observed: "It's a pretty spectacular, yet miserable location. It is wet and rainy, and the mud is thick....[it] really gets the actors in the mood of being at the end of the world in all of this cold and damp and chill."

==== Beyond the Wall ====
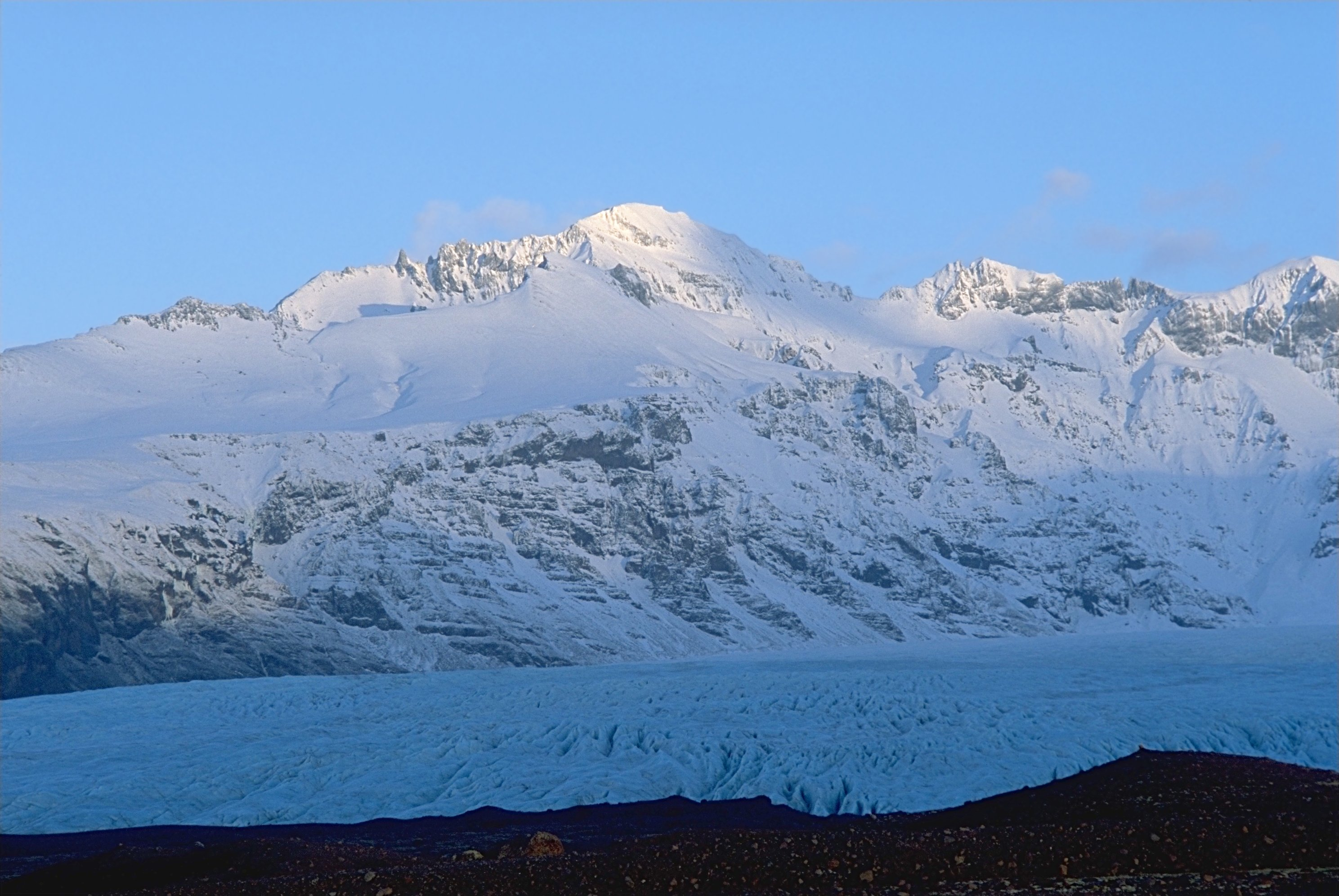
Season 2 of the TV adaptation featured scenes set north of the Wall that were filmed on the Vatnajökull glacier in Iceland.

North of the Wall is a vast stretch of cold, uncharted lands that encompass at least a third of the continental area of Westeros. The northernmost regions, known as the Land of Always Winter, are ice sheet regions where mystic malicious beings known as the Others reputedly originate. The harsh extreme north is separated the more inhabitable southeastern regions by a large crescentic mountain system known as the Frostfangs, which partly shielded the cold fronts from a vast boreal forest known as the Haunted Forest, where human inhabitants known as wildlings reside in hundreds of different tribes and hamlets. There is an ruined settlement called Hardhome at the tip of a peninsula on the east coast of the lands beyond the wall, which was close to becoming the only true town north of the Wall but was abruptly destroyed in a mysterious calamity six centuries before the main stories of A Song of Ice and Fire.

A Clash of Kings takes the story to the lands Beyond the Wall, although the first five books do not explore "what lies really north ... but we will in the last two books". The TV adaptation used Iceland as a filming location for the lands Beyond the Wall. Martin, who has never been to Iceland, said Beyond the Wall was "considerably larger than Iceland and the area closest to my Wall is densely forested, so in that sense it's more like Canada – Hudson Bay or the Canadian forests just north of Michigan. And then as you get further and further north, it changes. You get into tundra and ice fields and it becomes more of an arctic environment. You have plains on one side and a very high range of mountains on the other. Of course, once again this is fantasy, so my mountains are more like the Himalayas." In an HBO featurette, Martin stated the lands beyond the wall make up a big part of Westeros, being roughly the size of Canada. The Valley of Thenn is one such location beyond the Wall, and north of that is the Lands of Always Winter, where the Others come from.

During the first season, the production team used places that they could decorate with artificial snow for the north of the Wall, but a bigger landscape was chosen for season 2. "Primary filming for these scenes, which encompass both the Frostfangs and the Fist of the First Men, occurred at the Svínafellsjökull calving glacier in Skaftafell, Iceland, followed by shooting near Smyrlabjörg and Vík í Mýrdal on Höfðabrekkuheiði. Benioff said, "We always knew we wanted something shatteringly beautiful and barren and brutal for this part of Jon's journey, because he's in the true North now. It's all real. It's all in camera. We're not doing anything in postproduction to add mountains or snow or anything."

== Summer Sea ==
=== Basilisk Isles ===
East of Naath, the Basilisk Isles have been a festering sore of the Summer Sea, and a safe haven for pirates, slavers, sellswords, and outlaws. Ruins have been found on the Isle of Tears, the Isle of Toads, and Ax Island. The Isle of Tears is the largest island, with steep valleys and black bogs. It was conquered by the Ghiscari and called Gorgai for two centuries, until the dragonlords of Valyria captured it and renamed it Gorgossos. It was used as a prison by the Freehold, a place where they sent their most despicable criminals.

=== Naath ===
Naath, also known as the Isle of Butterflies, is an island off the north-west coast of Sothoryos that lies west of the Basilisk Isles. The Naathi people have dark skin and golden eyes. They practice extreme pacifism, making music instead of war and refusing to eat meat, only fruit. This makes them especially vulnerable to slavers from Essos. Foreigners to the island must limit their time on the island, as the air of the island carries a deadly disease known as the Butterfly Fever, which makes any permanent settlement impossible. The Naathi are immune to this disease. Daenerys' interpreter Missandei is from Naath.

=== Summer Islands ===
As indicated on a map in A Storm of Swords, the Summer Islands are a group of tropical islands situated to the south of Westeros, with a local fauna of talking birds, apes, and monkeys. The novels describe the island natives as dark-skinned people who speak their own language. They wear colored feathery clothes and live on fruit and fish. From their port city named Tall Trees Town, the Summer Isles export rare goods to Westeros such as wine, spices, feathers, but also a special kind of wood from which bows are made that have a longer range than most others. People of the Seven Kingdoms call the Summer Islanders' great vessels swan ships, "for their billowing white sails and for their figureheads, most of which depicted birds". Samwell Tarly, who spends two chapters in A Feast for Crows aboard a swan ship, describes the Summer Islander women as wanton, and their gods as strange; they "revered the elderly and celebrated their dead" through sexual intercourse. As a prostitute explains to Tyrion in A Clash of Kings, the Summer Islanders regard their sexuality as the gods' gift to worship them through mating, and hence many of their highborn youths and maidens serve in pleasure houses for a few years to honor the gods.

== Essos ==
Part of the narrative in A Song of Ice and Fire lies on Essos, a massive eastern continent across the Narrow Sea from Westeros, also simply known as "the east" by people of the Seven Kingdoms. Being roughly the size of Eurasia, Essos has geography and climate that vary greatly across regions, and is separated into two portions by a large north–south cordillera known as the Bone Mountains (the northern sections of which is also called Krazaaj Zasqa, meaning "white mountains", in the Dothraki language). The portion of the continent west of the Bone Mountains is mainly dominated by an expansive inland steppe known as the Dothraki Sea, while the regions east of the cordillera (known as the Further East) are still largely unknown.

The westernmost coastline of Essos is characterized by green rolling hills and the massive Forest of Qohor that give rise to various headwaters of the expansive Rhoyne river system, as well as extensive island chains such as those around Braavos, Lorathand Lys. The middle regions of the continent's known portion are represented by flat, temperate grasslands of the Dothraki Sea and Lhazar, as well as arid grasslands known as the Red Waste to the southeast. Beyond the Red Waste lies the coastal city of Qarth. The south is dominated by dry rolling hills and has a Mediterranean climate, with a coastline along the Summer Sea and Slaver's Bay. The north coast of the mainland is separated from the polar ice cap by the Shivering Sea. To the south, across the Summer Sea, lies the uncharted jungle continent of Sothoryos.

Much of the fictional history of Essos centers on Valyria, a ruined ancient city on a southern volcanic peninsula where House Targaryen originated, which was destroyed four centuries ago in an unspecified cataclysm known only as the Doom. After the Doom of Valyria and the collapse of their massive slave empire, the cities of Astapor, Yunkai and Meereen east of Valyria regained independence and ruled their respective areas as city-states. The area is known in the books as Slaver's Bay.

=== The Free Cities ===
Across the Narrow Sea on the western Essos, lie the nine Free Cities, independent city-states who each controls a significant region of the hinterlands. These nine cities are, from north to south, Braavos, Lorash, Norvos, Pentos, Qohor, Myr, Lorath, Lys and Volantis. All but two are coastal settlements with direct maritime access, except Norvos and Qohor, which are located on inland reaches of the expansive Rhoyne River. The Free Cities trade with the Seven Kingdoms and with each other, but also frequently wage war among each other over territorial control, and are thus prime markets to many bankers, mercenary free companies ("sellswords"), hitmen ("cutthroats") and privateer fleets ("sellsails").

Although most Free Cities are named early in the first novel, the books only provide a map of this region in A Dance with Dragons. Mountains to the east separate the coast from the plains of the Dothraki Sea, though gaps in the mountain range provide the Dothraki people some access to the Free Cities. All but one of the Free Cities were colonies built by the ancient Valyrian Freehold, who declared independence after the Doom of Valyria and still practise slavery; the only exception is Braavos, which was a secret colony founded by refugees, escaped slaves, and other rabble fleeing Valyrian expansion, where slavery is illegal. The common languages of the Free Cities are dialects of Bastard Valyrian.

The Free Cities span an area characterized by the river Rhoyne, which the local character Yandry describes as "the greatest river in the world". Its banks are the homeland of the Rhoynar, who worship the river as "Mother Rhoyne". As mapped in A Dance with Dragons, the Rhoyne originates from the conjunction of two of its tributaries, the Upper Rhoyne and the Little Rhoyne, southeast of the ruins of Ghoyan Drohe. The headwaters of the Upper Rhoyne lie in Andalos, the homeland of the Andals between Braavos and Pentos. The Rhoyne's course runs southeast to turn due south after Dagger Lake, where river pirates hide on and around the many lake islands. The Rhoyne gains in width considerably as it gets fed by more tributaries, until it opens into the Summer Sea in a delta near the Free City of Volantis.

==== Braavos ====
Unique among the Free Cities, Braavos was not a Valyrian colony, but a secret refuge from Valyrian expansion. It is a city spread over hundreds of tiny islands in a lagoon on the northwestern end of Essos, where the Narrow Sea and Shivering Sea meet. Braavos is home to the 'Iron Bank', one of the wealthiest banks in the known world. Braavos is also known for its swordsmen known as 'bravos', and its mysterious assassins, the Faceless Men. It is also famed for the Titan of Braavos, both a fortress and a statue. Braavos is ruled by the Sealord, and the city's power and wealth flow from the sea. The hulls of Braavosi ships are painted purple and their merchant ships sail to many distant lands and bring their trade and wealth back home. Braavos has many moneylenders, and the Iron Bank of Braavos lends money to foreign nations, especially The Crown, which has borrowed millions.

Braavosi fashion reflects the city’s varied social ranks: bright colors are common, while the very wealthy and powerful tend to favor black and dark blue. Keyholders and justiciars, among the city’s officials, wear dark brown or gray coats.

Braavos is also known for its courtesans, some of whom have become celebrated figures in the city. They travel by barge with attendants, and their beauty has inspired songs. Goldsmiths and other artisans seek their patronage, while wealthy nobles and merchants pay for their company at public events. The city’s bravos—skilled swordsmen—sometimes duel in a courtesan’s name.

Syrio Forel, once the Sea Lord’s First Sword, teaches Arya Stark Water Dancing, a Braavosi form of fencing. Practitioners stand side-on and use slender blades, emphasizing balance, precision, and control. Braavos has a strong dueling tradition, and bravos often test their skill against one another.

Braavos was inspired by Venice, Italy. In the TV series, locations used as Braavos included the Croatian towns of Šibenik and Kaštel Gomilica, and the Spanish town of Girona.

==== Pentos ====
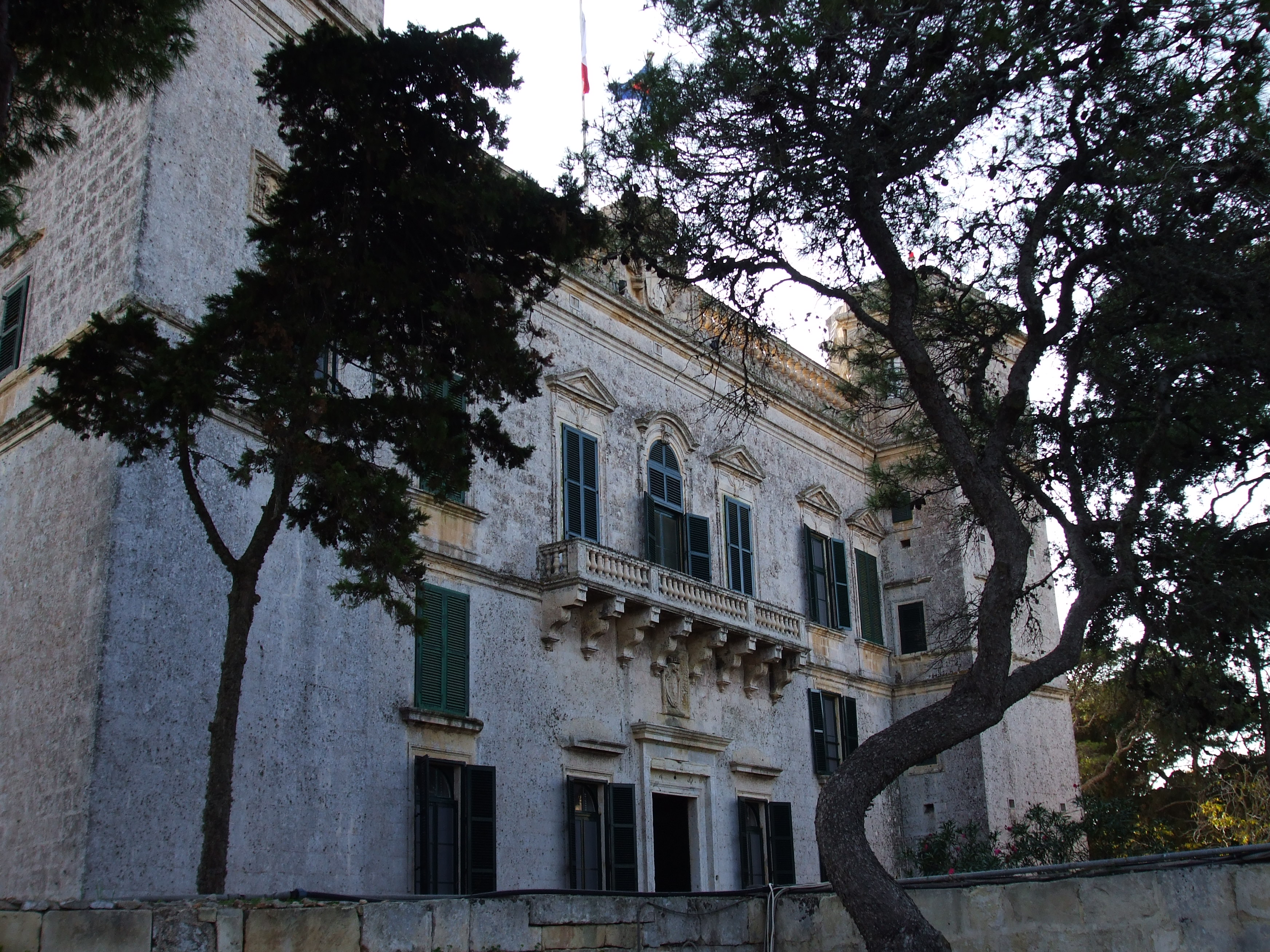
The TV series filmed Illyrio's mansion in Pentos at Verdala Palace in Malta.

Pentos is a major trading port on a bay of the western coast. Dominated by square brick towers, it is ruled by a Prince chosen by the city's de facto rulers, known as Magisters. Khalasars occasionally make their way this far from the Dothraki Sea, but the Pentoshi are spared much of the raiding and invasions by paying tribute to their khals. Men from Pentos wear dyed and forked beards. Unlike in most other Free Cities, slavery is outlawed, and Pentos is forbidden from participating in the slave trade due to terms set by the victorious Braavosi in a past war. However, Pentos only heeds these terms on a surface level: servants of the wealthy and powerful are still treated as slaves, collared in bronze and branded without the financial means of refusing their masters, and influential Pentoshi figures such as Magister Illyrio Mopatis still deal covertly in the slave trade.

In the television adaptation, Daenerys's scenes in the pilot episode were filmed in Morocco. The production redressed and repainted the Jerusalem sets of Kingdom of Heaven near Ouarzazate, Morocco, to serve as the courtyard of Illyrio's mansion where Daenerys first meets Khal Drogo. When the pilot was delivered, HBO scrapped all of the footage shot in Morocco, and the Pentos scenes were re-shot in Malta. The exterior scenes at Illyrio's mansion in Pentos were shot at Verdala Palace, the 16th-century summer palace of the president of Malta. The Azure Window, on the island of Gozo in Malta, was used for the location of Daenerys's wedding to Khal Drogo.

When Pentos reappeared in Season 5, it was filmed in Croatia.

==== Volantis ====
Volantis is a port city on the southwestern coast of Essos, located at the mouth of the Rhoyne, the principal river of western Essos. It is the oldest and proudest of the Free Cities, often styling itself "Old Volantis" or the "First Daughter of the Freehold". A fortification known as the Black Wall protects the city's oldest parts. The Black Wall is inhabited entirely by the wealthiest citizens who can claim unbroken descent from Old Valyria. The city is ruled by three triarchs, who are elected every year by free landholders of Volantis, and defended by slave soldiers called the "Tiger cloaks". Volantis is incredibly important to the slave market, and in the city there are five slaves to every free man. All Volantene slaves have facial tattoos denoting their profession: for instance, sex slaves have tears tattooed on their faces, and the tiger cloaks have tiger stripes. The worship of R'hllor is the most influential religion of Volantis, especially among slaves.

The TV adaptation used locations in Córdoba, Spain.

==== Other Free Cities ====
- Lorath is a port city on a group of northern islands. It is the most isolated and financially the weakest. The character Jaqen H'ghar poses as a Lorathi in A Clash of Kings, wearing long hair dyed red on one side and white on the other.
- Lys sits astride a series of southern islands. Unlike most inhabitants of the Free Cities, the Lysene are homogeneously Valyrian and thus have fair skin, hair, and eyes similar to the Targaryens. Lys is well known for its pleasure houses, training slaves in the arts of love and selling them as concubines and bed-slaves. Lys also frequently fights over control of the Stepstones and the Disputed Lands. There appears to be a love goddess whose worship is peculiar to Lys. Dany's handmaiden Doreah and the pirate Salladhor Saan are Lysene.
- Myr is a coastal city renowned for its master lenscrafters, intricate lace, and fine carpets. Like the Dornish, the Myrmen descend from Rhoynar and have dark eyes and olive skin. Myrmen are also similar to Norvosi and Pentoshi in that they are ruled by magisters that are known to pay tribute to passing Dothraki khalasars. Myr is a hub of trade in both slaves and their signature green nectar wines. Myr frequently fights over control of the Disputed Lands.
- Norvos sits on the main continent in two parts, one atop a high hill and the other beside a low river. The city has three large bells, each with its own name and distinctive voice, that are rung frequently. The surrounding area is a land of rolling hills, terraced farms, and white-stucco villages. The climate is fairly mild. Norvosi are recognized by their dyed, upswept mustaches. A council of magisters runs the city, and they are known to pay tribute to passing Dothraki khalasars. It is also home to a group of bearded priests that train elite guardsmen. These guardsmen swear oaths of duty and consider themselves wedded to their distinctive long axes.
- Qohor is situated on the main continent, in the vast Forest of Qohor. It is known for its fine tapestries and its smiths, who have the rare ability to reforge Valyrian steel, even directly infusing the metal with a variety of different colors. The Black Goat is a prominent god in the city. Qohor's city guard has been composed solely of Unsullied eunuch slave soldiers ever since the Battle of the Three Thousand, when 3,000 Unsullied soldiers successfully defended the city against over 25,000 Dothraki horse riders. Guardsmen tie braids of human hair to their spears to commemorate the Dothraki cutting their braids in salute to Qohor's defenders.
- Tyrosh, a coastal city-state ruled by an Archon, is infamous for its avarice. Traders deal extensively in slaves, Tyroshi pear brandy, and dyes of many colors. The city features an abundance of pleasure houses, but they are not as highly regarded as those in Lys. Tyroshi master armorsmiths make intricate armor in fantastic shapes. Tyrosh is a popular center for the hiring of sellswords. The city is often drawn into the ongoing conflicts over the Disputed Lands and the Stepstones. The Tyroshi often wear forked beards and pointed mustaches dyed in bright colors. The character Daario Naharis is from Tyrosh.

=== Central Essos ===
This section covers the Essos locations east of the Free Cities that Daenerys Targaryen passes through on her travels in A Game of Thrones and A Clash of Kings before moving on to Slaver's Bay.

==== Valyria ====
Valyria is a ruined ancient city located in the southern part of a mountainous peninsula in southern Essos, surrounded by a chain of volcanoes known as the Fourteen Flames. The entire peninsula has now fragmented into a number of islands and islets separated by a fumarole-infested inland sea known as the Smoking Sea, which continues to boil and smoke and is said to be haunted by demons. The peninsula protrudes into the Summer Sea, creating a semi-enclosed bay to its east side known as Slaver's Bay. Valyria was destroyed by a mysterious cataclysmic supervolcanic explosion known as the Doom, four centuries before the main story of A Song of Ice and Fire.

Before the Doom of Valyria, it was the seat of the Valyrian Freehold, a massive empire that conquered and ruled over most of the western and central Essos for some five thousand years. The success of the Freehold lay in the taming of dragons by Valyrians, who are characterized by silver hair, violet eyes and striking (some say inhumanly) beauty. The taming of dragons allowed the Valyrians to engage in aerial battles as dragonriders and scorch their enemies from above with dragonfire, which gave them decisive tactical advantages over other civilizations, resulting in the Valyrian conquest of the Old Empire of Ghis, the Rhoynars and other minor kingdoms of central Essos. Ironically, Valyria was called "Freehold" because every land-owning citizen was free to vote for the leaders, although the majority of the empire's populous actually lived under a system of slavery, where the Valyrians used conquered prisoners as slaves, particularly to mine the Fourteen Flames for ores. They also used dragonfire to forge unrivalled high-quality steel known as Valyrian steel, as well as fire-fused stone highways known as Valyrian roads. About twoscore (forty) noble dynasties were established among the Valyrian clans actually capable of taming and controlling dragons — known as dragonlords — who all resided in Old Valyria and feuded among each other for authority and prestige. These dragonlord clans ruled over other Valyrian vassals that couldn't tame dragons, and the latter, who lived in both the capital and various provinces of the Freehold, in turn ruled over the local commoner and slave subjects.

Twelve years before the Doom, House Targaryen, a minor dragonlord clan, voluntarily migrated to the island of Dragonstone, which was then only a remote western outpost of the Freehold off the coasts of Westeros. The decision to move out of Valyria by the then-patriarch of the clan, Aenar Targaryen, was due to the foretelling by his daughter Daenys. Daenys was a prophetic dreamer, who foresaw the Doom of Valyria in her dreams, and in response Aenar sold off all their estates and holdings in Old Valyria and moved away along with their five dragons and three vassal clans Velaryon, Celtigar and Qoherys. The Targaryens' exodus was seen by other Valyrian clans as a cowardly surrender to their rivals, who mocked their departure as fleeing due to madness. After the total destruction of Valyria in the Doom, the self-exiled Targaryens became the only surviving dragonlords, but they chose to stay in low profile for the next hundred years, while the collapse of the Freehold left Essos in a power vacuum and state of violent chaos known as the Century of Blood, and allowed the rise of more eastern horse tribes such as the Dothraki.

==== Dothraki Sea ====
The Dothraki Sea is a vast, flat steppeland that encompasses most of central Essos. It is inhabited by the Dothraki people, a copper-skinned race of warlike nomads with a unique horse culture. The Dothraki live in large tribal hordes known as khalasars, each led by a chieftain called a khal. Khalasars are further broken into groups called khas, each led by one of the khal's captains called kos. Each khal and his khalasar owes fealty to a ruling council of royal priestesses, called the dosh khaleen, whose members are each a former khal's consort called a khaleesi during her husband's reign, who became part of the dosh khaleen after his death.

Dothraki are expert horseriders proficient in both mounted archery and melee using curved sabers known as arakh, and horses are central to their culture, used for food, transportation, raw materials, warfare, and establishing social standing. Dothraki eat horseflesh, which they prefer to beef and pork as they believe horseflesh makes a man strong, and they drink a mildly alcoholic beverage derived from fermented mare milk. When a horselord dies, a horse is also slain so he can mount it in death, and the bodies of deceased are burned beneath the open sky. As nomads who don't cultivate the land, Dothraki regularly raid and loot other peoples, killing the men and kidnapping the women and children as slaves, some of whom they sold to the Slaver's Bay cities to trade for other needed commodities.

George R. R. Martin said, "The Dothraki were actually fashioned as an amalgam of a number of steppe and plains cultures ... Mongols and Huns, certainly, but also Alans, Sioux, Cheyenne, and various other Amerindian tribes ... seasoned with a dash of pure fantasy. So any resemblance to Arabs or Turks is coincidental. Well, except to the extent that the [historic] Turks were also originally horsemen of the steppes, not unlike the Alans, Huns, and the rest." He also noted that "In general, though, while I do draw inspiration from history, I try to avoid direct one-for-one transplants, [so] it would not be correct to say that the Dothraki are Mongols." There are several similarities with another group of fearsome, nomadic warriors – the Scythians.

The Dothraki have only one permanent settlement called Vaes Dothrak (meaning "city of riders" in the Dothraki language), locate next to a freshwater lake named "Womb of the World" at the foot of a lonely mountain named "Mother of Mountains". The city serves as the Dothraki capital, and the dosh khaleen hold the city as their seat. It is filled with statues looted from other cities the Dothraki conquered or raided. There is a law that no Dothraki may shed blood within the boundaries of Vaes Dothrak and that those who do are cursed. Two gigantic bronze stallions, whose hooves meet midair, form an arch above the entryway to the city.

For the first season of the HBO TV adaptation, Sandy Brae in the Mourne Mountains of Northern Ireland was chosen to stand in for Vaes Dothrak. The bronze stallions making up the Horse Gate as the main entrance of Vaes Dothrak were later added using CGI on two pedestals erected on location.

==== Ghiscar and Slaver's Bay ====
A gulf of the northern Summer Sea is created by flanking of two capes, namely the now-fragmented Valyrian peninsula and an anvil-shaped peninsula to the east known as Ghiscar. The inner portion of the gulf is known as the Slaver's Bay, namesaked as its eastern shores are home to three city-states infamous for slave trade, namely (from north to south) Meereen, Yunkai and Astapor. The Slaver's Bay is separated from the outer portion of the gulf, known as the Gulf of Grief, by an island called the Isle of Cedars and a small unnamed islet, both of which have been uninhabited since the Doom of Valyria. The bay lies to the south of the Dothraki Sea, separated by the eastern offshoots of the Painted Mountains; and connects to the Lhazar regions further east of the Ghiscari peninsula via the Skahazadhan River. Due to its proximity to the volcanic Valyrian peninsula, the climate around the Slaver's Bay is very hot.

The three slaver cities were built from the rubble of the Old Empire of Ghis, an ancient rival of the Valyria Freehold that was defeated, razed and salted by Valyria thousands of years before the series' events. The economies of the cities are largely based on training and trading of slave labor. Treatment of slaves is often harsh, while the slaver citizens live in relative luxury. Professional soldiers of all three cities wear outlandish costumes and hairstyles that limit their usefulness in battle, and the actual battle duties are heavily dependent on hired mercenaries and conscripted slaves, the most famous of the latter being the Unsullied, elite eunuch warriors trained in Astapor.

Present inhabitants of the bay are a mixed race that no longer speak the old Ghiscari language but a creole variant of High Valyrian with a characteristic growl. The ancient folk of Ghis, who name themselves the harpy's sons in Astapor, are said to have bristly red-black hair. The Good Masters of Astapor all appear alike to Daenerys as "thick fleshy men with amber skin, broad noses, dark eyes. Their wiry hair was black or a dark red, or that queer mixture of red and black that was peculiar to Ghiscari". Only the freeborn men of Astapor are permitted to wear garments called tokars, whose fringes display their status. Many Astapori women veil their face for the dust. The Astapori are drenched in sweet perfumes.

After a first mention in A Game of Thrones in relation to slavery, Daenerys Targaryen, who is convinced by Jorah Mormont to purchase a slave army at Astapor instead of returning to Pentos, successfully conquers Astapor, Yunkai and Meereen in A Storm of Swords. She stays in Meereen throughout most of A Dance with Dragons.

===== Astapor =====
The oldest city in Slaver's Bay. Astapor lies on the banks of the Worm River, a wide, slow, and crooked stream with wooded islands. Entering Astapor at the beginning of A Storm of Swords, Daenerys experiences it as an ancient and dilapidated city that has long passed its glory days. The city is dominated by its red brick architecture, and Arstan Whitebeard explains to Daenerys that the saying "Brick and blood built Astapor, ... and brick and blood her people" refers to the slaves who make the bricks. Astapor's stepped pyramids, its fighting pits, streets, the surrounding walls, and the Plaza of Pride are all made of red bricks. The so-called Plaza of Punishment at Astapor's main gates is even larger than the Plaza of Pride.

The Plaza of Pride, with a red-brick fountain and a huge bronze harpy statue at its center, serves as an open-air slave market and a marshaling area for the Unsullied, elite eunuch spearmen known for discipline and effectiveness. Astapor is the only city to sell Unsullied, but also sells bed slaves, fieldhands, scribes, craftsmen, and tutors. The Unsullied require a huge investment in both time and money by the Astapori who raise and train them, but they earn the most profitable of returns for the Good Masters of Astapor. The Unsullied wear spiked bronze hats, and they obey at all costs, even if it demands their death. They are given new slave names each day to be reminded of their worthlessness. In times of attack, unsold Unsullied are deployed to the massive, crumbling red-brick walls that the Astapori no longer man.

Daenerys decides to buy all of Astapor's trained and untrained Unsullied, over 8600 in number, and tells them to kill all adult Astapori slavers and soldiers when she leaves the city. She gives the power over Astapor to a council of former slaves led by a healer, a scholar, and a priest, and tens of thousands of former slaves join her on her travels to Yunkai. A former butcher named Cleon fends off a scheme to have the Good Masters re-established, and was crowned as the King of Astapor in reward.

The TV show used the coastal town of Essaouira, Morocco to film scenes in Astapor.

===== Yunkai =====
The smallest of the three cities, Yunkai, like Meereen, does not trade in Unsullied but is known for its fighting pits and its pleasure houses, both of which turn out slaves at a brisk pace. The city is similar to Astapor in architecture, except for its smaller size and its use of yellow brick instead of red. The slavers of Yunkai are known as the Wise Masters. Because the city lacks Unsullied, it relies on a mixed professional and slave army of about 4,000, including at least 1,000 mercenaries. Typical for Ghiscari, Yunkish soldiers wear impractical armor and oiled hair teased into enormous shapes, limiting their effectiveness.

Yunkish scenes were filmed in Aït Benhaddou, Morocco in the TV show.

===== Meereen =====
The largest of the three slave cities, Meereen has a population equaling that of Astapor and Yunkai combined. The city is also the wealthiest; besides slaves, it produces wine with a metallic taste. The surrounding lands have massive deposits of copper, and it grows olives, before the slavers burned the trees to starve out Daenerys's army. The city has architecture similar to that of its neighbors, but it is made of bricks of many colors. Its landscape is dominated by a massive pyramid, the Great Pyramid, and the Temple of Graces, capped by a golden dome. Meereen is unique among the Ghiscari cities in that it is filled with many temples and pyramids. The slavers of Meereen are known as the Great Masters. It is built on the banks of the river Skahadhazan. After Daenerys conquers the city, she continues to rule it as its queen to learn how to rule. The city is eventually besieged by an alliance of various city-states led by Yunkai, while a resistance known as the Sons of the Harpy rises within.

For the HBO television series, many of the scenes in Meereen were filmed in Split and the Fortress of Klis, Croatia. In Season 5, Daznak's Pit in the city was shot in the Plaza de Toros in Osuna, Spain.

==== Lhazar and the Red Waste ====
Lhazar is an alluvial plain region on the left (south) bank of the Skahazadhan River, which separates the region from the Dothraki Sea. A region of pastures and hills, it is inhabited by the Lhazareens, a peaceful people with bronze skin, flat faces, and almond eyes who are predominantly shepherds, pejoratively called the Lamb Men by the Dothraki, who frequently raid, loot and slaughters them. The Lhazareens worship a god called the Great Shepherd and believe that all of humanity is part of a single flock. The scenes at the village of the Lamb Men that is sacked by the Dothraki were filmed in Malta, at the farming town of Manikata.

The Red Waste is a large, arid, desert-like region southeast of Lhazar. Not much is known about it, since it was only briefly seen in A Clash of Kings when Daenerys Targaryen and her remaining khalasar crossed it. The only known settlement in the region, Vaes Tolorro, is in ruins.

===== Qarth =====
Qarth is a port city at the southeastern tip of the Red Waste. First mentioned in A Game of Thrones, Qarth has not yet appeared on any maps in the books. However, the HBO Viewer's Guide world map and the opening titles of the TV series' second season show Qarth located at a strait between the Summer Sea and the Jade Sea in the south-east of Essos. In the 2012 map book The Lands of Ice and Fire, Qarth is depicted as located just west of the southern end of the Bone Mountains, across a strait called the Jade Gates from the Great Moraq, the largest known Island of the A Song of Ice and Fire world.

Upon Daenerys Targaryen's first visit to Qarth in A Clash of Kings, the warlock Pyat Pree describes his city as the center of the world and as a gateway of commerce and culture between the east and west, and the north and south. Through Daenerys's eyes, the reader learns that the city is surrounded by three graded walls thirty to fifty feet high, engraved with portraits of animals, war and lovemaking. The city's buildings are of many colors, including rose, violet, and umber. Slender towers rise throughout the city, fountains adorn every square, and thousands of colored birds, blooming trees, and flowers fill the city. The TV adaptation filmed Qarth on the island of Lokrum near Dubrovnik and constructed a set at the Dubac quarry in Croatia to double for the gates of Qarth.

The Qartheen are described as "tall pale folk in linen and samite and tiger fur", with the women wearing gowns that leave one breast bare, while the men sport beaded silk skirts. Daenerys perceives them as "nothing if not polite". Slaves serve their needs. The Pureborn, descendants of the city's ancient kings and queens, govern Qarth and also command the city's defenses. Three principal merchant groups battle amongst themselves and against the Pureborn for dominance of the city: the Thirteen, the Ancient Guild of Spicers, and the Tourmaline Brotherhood. Qarth's warlocks, whose lips are turned blue from a potion called "the shade of the evening", are said to brood over these factions; they are still feared although their power and prestige have waned over the years. Qarth is also home to the Sorrowful Men, a guild of assassins named so for whispering "I am so sorry," before killing their victims. Daenerys leaves Qarth again at the end of A Clash of Kings.

==== Ibben ====
Ibben is an archipelago nation off the central-north coast of Essos, in the Shivering Sea. The largest of the islands is Ib, whose southwestern coast forms a semi-enclosed bay known as the Bay of Whales, which contains the Port of Ibben, one of the two main settlements of Ibben along with Ib Nor on the island's north coast. The second-largest island of Ibben is Far Ib, located more than a hundred leagues to the southeast of Ib. There was also two other colonies of Ibben on mainland Essos, namely Ibbish, a ruined settlement that had been sacked and destroyed by the Dothraki (who pejoratively renamed the place Vaes Aresak, meaning "city of cowards"); and New Ibbish, located at the tip of a forested peninsula directly south of Ib.

Until the Doom of Valyria, Ibben was ruled by a God-King. Now power is held by the Shadow Council, which is made up of nobles, priests, and wealthy guild members. Ibben is first mentioned in A Game of Thrones, where Tyrion talks of rumors that mammoths "roam the cold wastes beyond the Port of Ibben". In 2002, Martin said the narrative would "probably not" take readers to Ibben, which he described as a "cold, mountainous, Iceland-sized island" (i.e. 103,000 km^{2}, 40,000 sq mi) in the Shivering Sea, with the Port of Ibben as the major city; some Ibbenese also live on smaller islands nearby or in colonies on Essos. Ibben is unmapped in the books as of A Dance with Dragons, but similar to Martin's descriptions, the HBO Viewer's Guide world map gives the island's location as to the north-east of Essos. Martin said that due to a large whale population in the Shivering Sea, many of the Ibbenses were whalers. The Ibbenses are known to chew whale blubber in order to maintain their metabolism in the cold climate. Several characters see Ibbenese whalers and cogs at the ports of King's Landing, Braavos, Maidenpool, Eastwatch-by-the-Sea, White Harbour, and the Iron Islands. The novels describe the people of Ibben as squat and hairy; Arya even meets an Ibbenese woman with a mustache. It is implied the people may be Neanderthals. Tyrion and Varys meet foul-smelling Ibbenese, who "were as fond of axes as they were of each other". Arya sees "a dark brutal axeman from Ib" in her dreams. The Ibbenese are said to speak with low, raspy voices and to have their own language.

=== Eastern Essos ===
==== Asshai and the Shadow Lands ====
Asshai and the Shadow Lands are mysterious locations in the Ice and Fire world. They are first mentioned in A Game of Thrones and were first mapped in The Lands of Ice and Fire, lying on the far east of the known world. Martin is unsure if the books will ever take the readers to Asshai, but said that readers may learn more through the POV character Melisandre (who originates from Asshai) or through the memories and mentions of other characters. Jorah Mormont describes Asshai as a port city far to the south of the Dothraki Sea, at the end of the known world. Asshai exports such goods as black amethysts, amber, and dragonglass. At another time, Jorah Mormont tells Daenerys of great kingdoms to the east of the Red Waste, and lists Asshai by the Shadow as one of the cities full of wonders there. According to Martin, all ships traveling between Westeros and Asshai go via the Summer Sea and the Jade Sea through the straits at Qarth, and the common folk still believe the world to be flat. However, according to Martin, "Asshai is not nearly [as] important to trade as Yi Ti, and the rich port cities of Yi Ti (and Leng) and more easily reached via Qarth." Quaithe of the Shadow prophesies Daenerys in Qarth that "To go north, you must journey south. To reach the west, you must go east [...] and to touch the light you must pass beneath the shadow." When Daenerys interprets this to mean she must go to Asshai, Quaithe says she would find the truth there.

There are many tales about the Shadow Lands, though how much truth they hold is unclear. The Dothraki believe that ghost grass covers the Shadow Lands, with stalks that glow in the dark and grow taller than a man on horseback. Daenerys heard that "spellsingers, warlocks, and aeromancers practiced their arts openly in Asshai, while shadowbinders and bloodmages worked terrible sorceries in the black of night". There are also Westerosi maesters in Asshai. The mages of Asshai teach others their healing powers, but also their spells requiring blood sacrifice. Ancient books of Asshai record the Azor Ahai prophecy followed by members of the R'hllor faith. Daenerys heard that dragons themselves originated from the Shadow Lands beyond Asshai and the islands of the Jade Sea, and they possibly still live there. Bran dreams of flying Dragons in Asshai. The petrified dragon eggs Illyrio gives to Daenerys are said to come from the Shadow Lands. The "dour and frightening" Shadow Men cover their bodies in tattoos and wear lacquered wooden masks, and the appearance of the Asshai'i is described as dark and solemn. The Dothraki believe the Asshai'i to be the spawn of shadows. The Asshai'i have a language of their own.

==== Yi Ti ====
Yi Ti is a region southeast of the Bone Mountains, and is currently home to the Golden Empire of Yi Ti, a large civilization that has more cities than any other land in the known world, and according to Lomas Longstrider, their cities are much larger and more splendid than cities in the west. It is bounded to the west by the Bone Mountains and the island of Great Moraq, to the north by the Great Sand Sea, the Shrinking Sea and the Plains of the Jogos Nhai, to the northeast by the Bleeding Sea, the Land of the Shrykes and the Grey Waste, to the east by the Mountains of the Morn, to the southeast by the Shadow Lands, and to the south by the islands of Leng, Marahai, Manticore and Whips in the Jade Sea.

The novels repeatedly describe Yi Ti as an mystical empire with cities full of wonder, lying in the far east. As of A Dance with Dragons, Yi Ti has not appeared on any maps in the books, but Martin specified that "Yi Ti is to the southeast of Qarth, generally, across the Jade Sea."

The empire is first mentioned in A Game of Thrones, talking of rumors that "basilisks infested the jungles of Yi Ti". Sailor stories presented in A Feast for Crows mention that a grey plague has hit Yi Ti. The god of the people of Yi Ti is called the Lion of Night. Daenerys sees people of Yi Ti as bright-eyed men in monkey-tail hats in the markets of Vaes Dothrak. Yi Ti has more cities than any other land in the known world, and according to Lomas Longstrider they are much larger and more splendid than cities in the west. According to Colloquo Votar, three older cities lie buried beneath every YiTish city. The capital of the Golden Empire of Yi Ti is Yin, along the Jade Sea. Martin is unsure "to what extent those peoples [like of Yi Ti] will ever enter this present story, however... their lands are very far away."

==== Plains of Jogos Nhai ====
North of Yi Ti, the Plains of Jogos Nhai are windswept, with rolling hills. They are dominated by a race of mounted warriors called the Jogos Nhai. The Jogos Nhai live in yurts and tents, and are a nomadic people. They are short and squat, with large heads and small faces. Men and women both have pointed skulls, a result of their custom of binding the heads of newborns. They also ride zorses, a striped mount that can withstand much more than the average horse. The Jogos Nhai do not fight among themselves and live in small clans bound by blood. They live in a state of perpetual war with outsiders, raiding many YiTish cities and reducing around a hundred towns to ruin. Each tribe is commanded by a jhat, or war chief, and a moonsinger, who is a priestess, healer, and judge. Moonsingers are generally female, and jhats are mostly male. (Paraphrased from The World of Ice and Fire)

== Sothoryos ==
To the south of Essos is the continent of Sothoryos (mistakenly spelled Sothoros in early novels). Sothoryos is the third continent of the known world, and is vast, plague-ridden, covered in jungles, and largely unexplored. It is reported to be as large as Essos and described as a "land without end" by Jaenara Belaerys, a Valyrian dragonlord from before the Doom of Valyria.

The continent is first named on a map in A Storm of Swords (2000), showing the cities of Yeen and Zamettar on it. The narrative itself first refers to the continent in A Feast for Crows (2005). Martin had described Sothoryos in 2002 as "the southern continent, roughly equivalent to Africa, jungly, plague-ridden, and largely unexplored." The novels provide little other information. The swampy nature of Sothoryos is briefly referenced by Victarion in A Dance with Dragons, and teak from Sothoryos is said to be used to build ships. A corsair's road runs along the continent's northern coast. A Dance with Dragons refers to the diseases on Sothoryos regarding the wealthy but sick Yunkai'i slave trader Yezzan zo Qaggaz. Victarion describes some people as "squat and hairy as the apes of Sothoros", and some people fighting in Daznak's Pit for Daenerys's entertainment in A Dance with Dragons are described as "brindle-skinned half-men from the jungles of Sothoros". Martin said that, unlike other peoples in the novels, the brindled men of Sothoryos were pure fantasy constructs.

== Ulthos ==
The map collection The Lands of Ice and Fire also shows the northern tip of a landmass named "Ulthos" to the south of Essos and east of Sothoryos. Asked whether this was another continent, Martin replied, "Well, it's a large landmass. I am a little unclear on the formal definition of 'continent' as opposed to 'big island.' Also, on the size of Ulthos, which, after all, sits at the edge of the known world. Terra incognita and all that."
