= Jenny Jones =

Jenny Jones may refer to:

== People ==
- Jenny Jones (presenter) (born 1946), television personality and host of The Jenny Jones Show
- Jenny Jones, Baroness Jones of Moulsecoomb (born 1949), British Green Party politician, member of the House of Lords
- Jenny Jones (Labour politician) (born 1948), British Labour politician, former Member of Parliament for Wolverhampton South West
- Jenny Jones (snowboarder) (born 1980), British professional snowboarder

== Other ==
- The Jenny Jones Show, American TV series sometimes referred to as Jenny Jones
- Jenny Jones (musical), a 1944 West End musical

== See also ==
- Jennifer Jones (disambiguation)
- Janie Jones (disambiguation)
- Jenna Jones (born 2001), Australian swimmer
