= Jennifer Jones (disambiguation) =

Jennifer Jones (1919–2009) was an American actress.

Jennifer Jones may also refer to:

- Jennifer Jones (Rockette) (born 1967), American dancer who was the first African American Rockette
- Jennifer Jones (curler) (born 1974), Canadian sports personality; competitor in the sport of curling
- Jennifer E. Jones, president of Rotary International for the 2022–2023 year
- Jennifer Clare Jones, American radiation oncologist and biologist
- Jennifer Jones-Kernahan (born 1953), Trinidad and Tobago politician and diplomat

== See also ==
- Jenifer Jones, American politician in New Mexico
- Gemma Jones (born 1942), English actress whose birth name is Jennifer Jones
- Jennifer Jayne (born 1931), English actress whose birth name is Jennifer Jayne Jones
- Jenny Jones (disambiguation)
- Jones (surname)
