= Slave Ship (film) =

1937 film by Tay Garnett

- Directed by: Tay Garnett
- Written by: William Faulkner (story)
- Screenplay by: Sam Hellman; Lamar Trotti; Gladys Lehman
- Based on: The Last Slaver by George S. King
- Produced by: Darryl F. Zanuck
- Starring: Warner Baxter; Wallace Beery; Elizabeth Allan; Mickey Rooney; George Sanders; Jane Darwell; Joseph Schildkraut
- Cinematography: Ernest Palmer
- Edited by: Lloyd Nosler
- Music by: Alfred Newman
- Production company: 20th Century Fox
- Distributed by: 20th Century Fox
- Release date: June 12, 1937
- Running time: 100 minutes
- Country: United States
- Language: English

Slave Ship is a 1937 American historical adventure film directed by Tay Garnett and starring Warner Baxter, Wallace Beery and Elizabeth Allan. The supporting cast features Mickey Rooney, George Sanders, Jane Darwell, and Joseph Schildkraut. It is one of very few films out of the forty-eight that Beery made during the sound era for which he did not receive top billing.

== Plot ==
Wallace Beery as Jack Thompson

In 1860, on the eve of the American Civil War, slavery is still allowed in the Southern United States. However, the slave trade has been illegal for many years. Illegal importing slaves is a profitable business, but it carries severe penalties if caught. Jim Lovett, a sailor in New England, has purchased a barque for that purpose. He names it Albatross because it has a history of men dying on it due to accidents. Lovett and his crew are all shareholders in the business.

The Albatross sails to West Africa, when they load a cargo of enslaved people. The ship then takes them to Virginia, where the cargo is secretly disembarked and sold. While in Virgina, Jim meets Nancy Marlowe of Norfolk. He is immediately smitten with her and remains in the area. Jim does not tell her that he is a slaver. Two months later, Jim and Nancy are married.

Jim wants to keep his past from Nancy, so he tells his first mate Jack Thompson to fire his existing crew and hire a new group. Jim's plan is to said the both of them to Jamaica, where he would buy a plantation. When Jack relays Jim's plan to the crew, they are outraged and take control of the Albatross. They sail back to Africa, with Jim and Nancy on board, to load another group of enslaved people. At this point, Jim is forced to admit to Nancy that he had been a slaver, she turns away in disappointment. During the trip, Jim stays intoxicated. Once in Africa, Nancy reconciles with him. After the slaves are selected and sent to the ship, Jack and crew member Lefty leave Jim ashore. He now has to face the slave dealer Danelo, whom the crew did not pay.

Jim escapes Danelo and reaches the Albatross, which is still anchored off the coast. He finds Nancy and they secure themselves in the bridge, where all the guns are stored. Knowing that he cannot hold off the men for long, Jim steers for St. Helena, a British island. After 72 hours without sleep, the crews sends Swifty the cabin boy to the bridge with food. The crew thinks that Swifty will let them in.

Swifty tell Jim that he is on his side, but Jim is doubtful. Nancy persuades Jim that Swifty is OK. Jim gives him a gun, saying that he needs another man. When the crew approaches the bridge, he battles them with Jim and Nancy. Jack then see St. Helena in the distance and panics. If the British catch the crew with slaves, they will all hang.

Jack orders the chained slaves to be brought on deck and thrown overboard, weighted with an anchor. During the chao, a fire starts from a fallen lantern. Jim rushes onto the deck and frees the slaves, enabling them to swim to shore. Jack then tries to attack Jim, but he shoots him. However, Jack is still able to knock out Jim.

As the fire intensifies, the crew abandon the Albatross. Thompson decides that he cannot leave Jim to die. He puts him in a life boat with Swifty and Nancy. As the life boat pulls away, the Albatross explodes in flames with Jack still on it. Once on St. Helena, Jim is placed on trial for slaving. Nancy pleads for an acquittal, explaining that Jim freed the slaves even though it would implicate him.

The court exonerate him. Jim, Nancy and Swifty then take passage to Jamaica, where Jim finally buys his plantation. Jim and Nancy's enjoyment of the quiet life is momentarily disrupted as Swifty fights with Scraps, the ship's drunken cook who rescued Nancy's dog, for a piece of pie.

== Cast ==
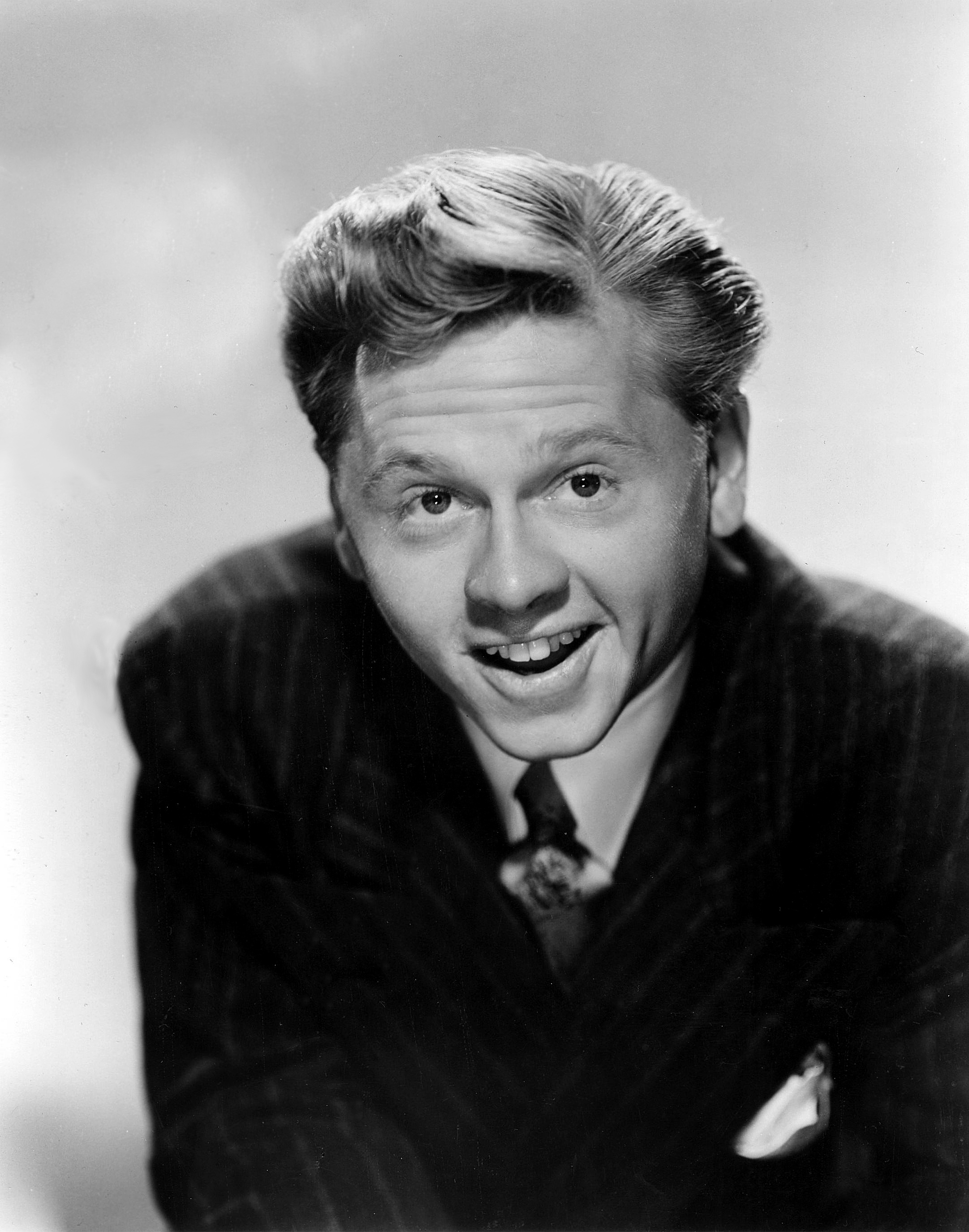
Mickey Rooney as Swifty

- Warner Baxter as Jim Lovett
- Wallace Beery as Jack Thompson
- Elizabeth Allan as Nancy Marlowe
- Mickey Rooney as Swifty
- George Sanders as Lefty
- Jane Darwell as Mrs. Marlowe
- Joseph Schildkraut as Danelo
- Miles Mander as Corey
- Arthur Hohl as Grimes
- Douglas Scott as Young Boy at Launching
- Minna Gombell as Mabel
- Billy Bevan as Atkins
- Francis Ford as Scraps
- Jane Jones as Ma Belcher
- J. Farrell MacDonald as Proprietor
- J. P. McGowan as Helmsman
- DeWitt Jennings as Snodgrass
- Paul Hurst as Drunk
- Dorothy Christy as Blonde
- Charles B. Middleton as Slave Dealer
- Dewey Robinson as Bartender
- Holmes Herbert as Commander
- Edwin Maxwell as Auctioneer
- Herbert Heywood as Old Man at Launching
- Winter Hall as Minister
- Marilyn Knowlden as Christener at Launching
- Arthur Aylesworth as Stranger

== Production ==
The offshore scenes for Slave Ship were filmed over 30 days in the Florida Keys and Bermuda. The ship scenes were filmed off the coast of Catalina Island in California.

== Reception ==
Writing for his magazine Night and Day in 1937, author Graham Greene gave Slave Ship a mixed review, finding fault with the "slow-motion emotions" of Warner Baxter's acting and the plot's "slowness and inevitability" whereas real life is replete with "unexpected encounter[s]". Nevertheless, Greene opined that "[Slave-Ship] isn't a bad film, [and] it has excellent moments". Chief amongst these moments, Greene praised the knife-throwing scenes and the general acting of Wallace Beery.

Motion Picture Daily wrote about Slave Ship,

"To young [Mickey] Rooney must go performance honors, since he comes close to stealing the picture. It may be considered unfortunate the he is made to appear such a young ruffian."
