= Lancaster Port Commission =

Lancaster Port Commission is the statutory harbour authority for the Port of Lancaster in England. It is now based at Glasson Dock. It was set up by act of parliament to facilitate the role that the port could play in international trade, particularly the Atlantic slave trade. Many of the early commissioners were active slave traders.

== History ==
Several Lancaster merchants and ship owners asked parliament for support in dealing with problems experienced in operating from Lancaster, Lancashire. This led to the passage of the River Lune Navigation Act 1749 (23 Geo. 2. c. 12): "An Act for improving the Navigation of the River Loyne, otherwise called Lune; and for building a Quay or Wharf near the Town of Lancaster in the County Palatine of Lancaster". This led to the construction of St George's Quay in 1750, and the Custom House was completed in 1764.

Robert Foxcroft was appointed chief customs officer and given the title of Collector. H had oversight of a substantial staff including searchers, clerical officers, landing and coast waiters, a surveyor and a weighing porter.

== Port Commissioners ==
- Abraham Rawlinson, slaver and subsequently MP for Lancaster
- Charles Inman, slaver
- Thomas Hinde, slaver
- Dodshon Foster (1755-1758), slaver
- Thomas Satterthwaite(1755-1758), slaver
- Robert Dodson (1764-1767)
