= Janie Jones (disambiguation) =

Janie Jones was an English singer.

Janie Jones may also refer to:

- "Janie Jones" (song), a 1977 song by the English punk rock band The Clash from their eponymous debut album
- Janie Jones (film), a 2010 American drama film by writer/director David M. Rosenthal

== See also ==
- Jane Jones (disambiguation)
