= List of slave trades =

The sale and purchase of enslaved humans

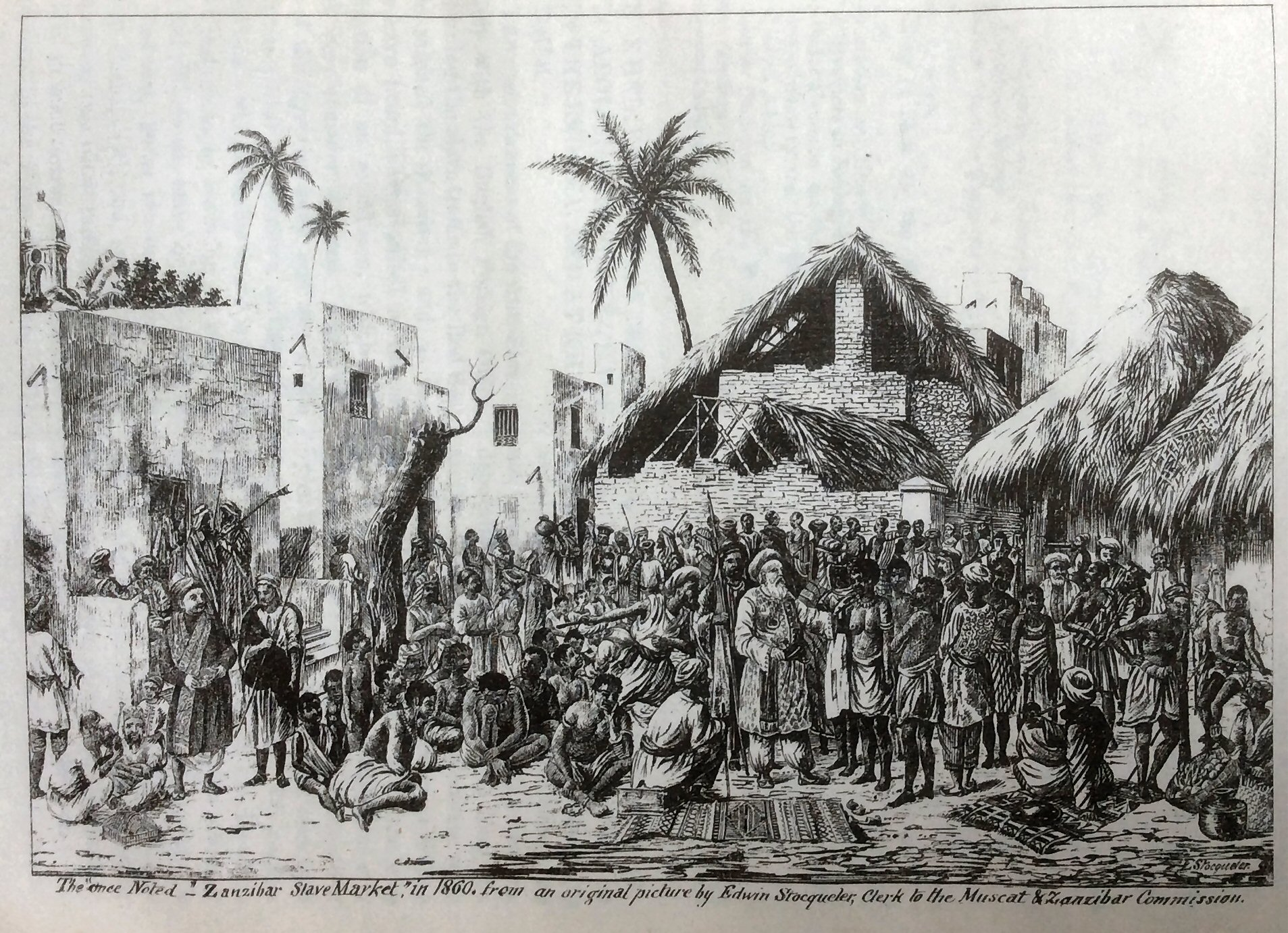
Drawing of a slave market in Zanzibar in 1860

Slave trade refers to the trafficking of enslaved people for profit. Slavery has been commonly practiced in most parts of the world throughout human history, dating even to prehistory. Slave trading arose in many regions, conducted by slave traders from a range of countries and cultures, as seen in the following list:

- Al-Andalus slave trade
- Arab slave trade
- Atlantic slave trade
  - Brazilian slave trade
  - Bristol slave trade
  - Danish slave trade
  - Lancaster slave trade
  - Liverpool slave trade
  - Nantes slave trade
  - Slave trade in the United States
    - Coastwise slave trade – slave trade along the southern and eastern coastal areas of the United States in the antebellum years prior to 1861
    - Indian slave trade in the American Southeast
- Balkan slave trade
- Baltic slave trade
- Barbary slave trade
- Black Sea slave trade
- Bukhara slave trade
- Genoese slave trade
- Indian Ocean slave trade
  - Comoros slave trade
  - Zanzibar slave trade
- Khazar slave trade
- Khivan slave trade
- Slave trade in medieval Europe
- Slave trade in the Mongol Empire
- Nantes slave trade
- Ottoman slave trade
  - Circassian slave trade
  - Crimean slave trade
- Pontic slave trade
- Prague slave trade
- Red Sea slave trade
  - Hejaz slave trade
- Somali slave trade
- Trans-Saharan slave trade
  - Libyan slave trade
- Swedish slave trade
- Venetian slave trade
- Volga Bulgarian slave trade
