= Dodshon Foster =

English merchant

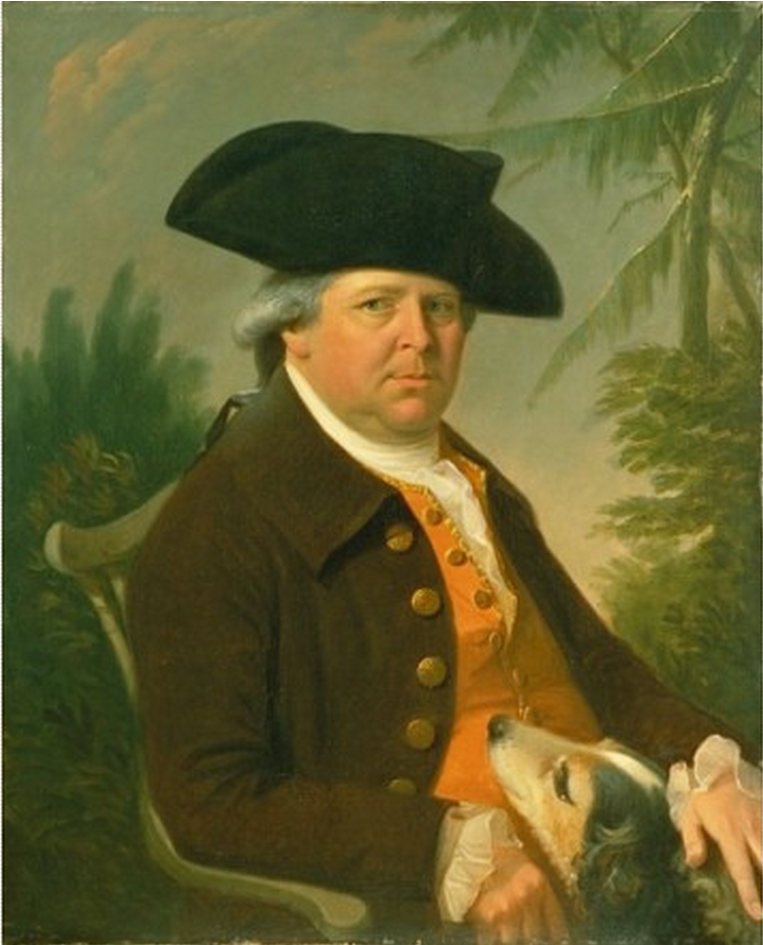
Portrait of Dodshon Foster by William Tate

Dodshon Foster (1 September 1730 - 2 January 1793) was an English merchant who profited from the slave trade. He was involved in the shipping of over 700 slaves during his career. His commercial success was assisted by his connection through marriage to the Birket family of merchants; he married Elizabeth, the daughter of Myles Birket.

Foster was the son of a Quaker merchant from Durham. Foster moved to Lancaster and entered into the slave trade in 1752 at the age of 21. His ship was named the Barlborough, and it made several slaving voyages between 1752 and 1758. He served as one of the Lancaster Port Commissioners between 1755 and 1758.

== Legacy ==
Foster had a house and warehouse on St George's Quay next to Lancaster Custom House. In 2005, an anti-slavery memorial commissioned by Lancaster's Slave Trade Art Memorial Project (STAMP) and designed by Kevin Dalton-Johnson was placed on the quayside. The Custom House is now a museum and has a portrait of Foster.
