= Thomas Satterthwaite =

Prominent English Quaker and Slave Trader

Thomas Satterthwaite (26 March, 1720, in Brighouse – 16 August 1790) was a prominent Quaker in Lancaster, Lancashire who was involved in the slave trade.

== Early life ==
Thomas was the son of Thomas Satterthwaite (1685-1728) and Mary Ledger. After the death of his father, the family moved to Lancaster, where Thomas' sister Cecily was living with her husband John Dilworth whom she had married in 1712. Dilworth was himself a prominent member of the Quaker community in Lancaster and was active in the slave trade. His brother, Benjamin Satterthwaite became a factor or agent for a group of Lancaster slave traders, first in Barbados and then in Jamaica. Amongst Benjamin's correspondence are letters to Thomas, primarily about business.

Thomas went into partnership with Charles Inman.

He was an early commissioner for the Lancaster Port Commission (1755-1758).
