= Thomas Hinde (senior) =

English slave trader based in Lancaster

Thomas Hinde (1720 in Caton – 4 February 1798 in Lancaster) was an English slave trader based in Lancaster. Although records exist for occasional involvement of Lancaster merchants in the slave trade before 1748, Thomas Hinde's voyage as master of the Jolly Batchelor of 6 September 1748 marked the commencement of the regular involvement of Lancaster merchants in the slave trade. Hinde made four voyages as master of this ship between 1748 and 1754. The Duke of Cumberland, the Prince George and the Lancaster are three ships recorded as belonging to Hind(l)e and Co. and involved in the slave trade in 1756. These ships transported a total of 340 enslaved Africans from Gambia in that year.

He was elected as a Port Commissioner for Lancaster in 1755. He served as Mayor of Lancaster in both 1769 and 1778.

He died in 1798 and was buried in the graveyard at Lancaster Priory.
