= Game of Thrones: Season 2 (soundtrack) =

Soundtrack album by Ramin Djawadi
- Released: June 19, 2012
- Genre: Soundtrack
- Length: 56:46
- Label: Varèse Sarabande
- Producer: Ramin Djawadi

Ramin Djawadi soundtrack chronology
Safe House (2012)	Game of Thrones: Season 2 (2012)	Medal of Honor: Warfighter (2012)

Singles from Game of Thrones: Season 2
- 1. "The Rains of Castamere" Released: June 19, 2012

The soundtrack album for the second season of HBO series Game of Thrones, titled Game of Thrones: Season 2, was published on June 19, 2012. The instrumental music by Ramin Djawadi was performed by the Czech Film Orchestra and Choir and recorded at the Rudolfinum concert hall in Prague.

== Reception ==
The soundtrack received mostly positive reviews. Tracksounds's review was again mixed, describing the score as little more than adequate. Noting a lack of thematic development or dramatic momentum, the reviewer nonetheless appreciated the score's more subdued moments, which he considered less forced than the rest of the track.

== Track listing ==
No.	Title	Key scenes/Notes	Length
1.	"Main Title"	Used in the opening sequence. New version introduced.	1:46
2.	"The Throne Is Mine"	"The North Remembers": During the massacre of Robert Baratheon's bastard children. Contains the melody of the House Baratheon ("The King's Arrival") and Petyr Baelish's theme ("Chaos Is a Ladder").	3:15
3.	"What Is Dead May Never Die"	House Greyjoy's theme. "The Night Lands": As Theon and Yara ride to Pyke. "What Is Dead May Never Die": Theon burns a letter warning Robb and consecrates his faith to the Drowned God. "The Ghost of Harrenhal": As Theon first sees the Sea Bitch. "Valar Morghulis": Theon prepares to make one last stand and encourages his men to do so before he is knocked out by them. "Mhysa": Yara tells Balon that she will rescue Theon from the Dreadfort. "The Laws of Gods and Men": Yara and her men sail to rescue Theon. The title comes from the refrain of the religion of the Drowned God: "What is dead may never die, but rises again harder and stronger." Contains the melody of the House Stark theme ("Goodbye Brother") in the very beginning.	2:06
4.	"Warrior of Light"	Stannis Baratheon and Melisandre's theme. "The North Remembers": During Melisandre's burning of the Seven Gods' idols. "The Night Lands": When Melisandre promises Stannis a son and they have sexual intercourse. "Garden of Bones": Stannis and Renly meeting. Davos takes Melisandre to shore. "The Ghost of Harrenhal": Renly is murdered by the shadow created by Melisandre. Stannis and Davos plan the attack on King's Landing. "Blackwater": Stannis's fleet arrives to Blackwater Bay. After the wildfire has been ignited Stannis still attacks with the surviving men. "Valar Dohaeris": Davos tries to murder Melisandre. "Walk of Punishment": Melisandre sails away from Dragonstone. "And Now His Watch Is Ended": A modified version appears as Varys tells Tyrion about his cutting, his life and reveals he has found the sorcerer who cut him. "Kissed by Fire": Thoros of Myr prays to the Lord of Light as they prepare for the Hound's trial by combat. "The Climb": Melisandre appears to the Brotherhood Without Banners. Thoros of Myr tells Melisandre about the first time Berric Dondarrion was resurrected. "Second Sons": Melisandre and Gendry arrive to Dragonstone. "Mhysa": Melisandre and Stannis reafirm that Gendry must die, to which Davos protests. Davos and Stannis discuss Melisandre's powers and the Lord of Light. "The Lion and the Rose": during the burning of Axel Florent, among others. "Breaker of Chains": Stannis threatens Davos.	3:03
5.	"Valar Morghulis"	Arya Stark's theme. "The Ghost of Harrenhal": Arya meets Jaqen and he tells her he shall give her three deaths. After Jaqen has killed the Tickler. "The Old Gods and the New": Arya tells Jaqen to kill Amory Loch before he gets to Tywin Lannister. "The Prince of Winterfell": Arya looks for Jaqen for him to kill Tywin Lannister. "Valar Morghulis": Jaqen finds Arya and, after she is unable to follow him to Braavos, gives her an iron coin which upon saying the words "Valar morghulis" to any Braavosi will provide her with help. "Mhysa": Arya looks at Jaqen's iron coin and says the words: "Valar morghulis". "Two Swords": Arya kills Polliver with Needle. "The House of Black and White": Arya is saved in Braavos by an old man who later reveals himself with the face of Jaqen H'ghar. He later lets Arya enter the House of Black and White. The title comes from the phrase in high Valyrian which translates to "all men must die".	2:59
6.	"Winterfell"	"The North Remembers": Robb orders his mother Catelyn to ride for the Stormlands and meet Renly Baratheon. "The Old Gods and the New": Roose Bolton tells Robb and Catelyn of Theon's betrayal. "The Prince of Winterfell": The full version plays when Bran and Rickon are revealed to be alive in the crypts beneath Winterfell. It goes on during the credits. "Valar Morghulis": Maester Luwin tells Bran, Rickon, Hodor and Osha to go to the Wall, and asks Osha to protect the children and give him a quick death. "The Bear and the Maiden Fair": Talisa tells Robb that she is pregnant. "Mhysa": Tyrion finds Sansa already lamenting her mother's and her brother's deaths. "Mockingbird": Sansa finds snow in the Eyrie for the first time ever since leaving Winterfell and builds a snow replica version of her home. "Hardhome": The first seconds are heard when Theon (known at this point as Reek) admits to Sansa that he never found Bran and Rickon and that he actually killed and burned two farm boys. "The Winds of Winter": Jon asks Sansa to trust each other and she announces that winter has come. The cue is a slightly modified version of the House Stark theme ("Goodbye Brother").	2:42
7.	"Qarth"	"Garden of Bones": Daenerys and her khalasar arrive to the city of Qarth. "The Ghost of Harrenhal": The masked Quaithe warns Jorah Mormont of dangers that Daenerys might face. "A Man Without Honor": Quaithe admits to Jorah her knowing of his feelings towards Daenerys and warns him that she is meeting the ones who kidnapped her dragons. Contains the melody of Daenerys Targaryen's theme ("Love in the Eyes").	2:11
8.	"Wildfire"	"Blackwater": the battle commences as Stannis' fleet approaches and Bronn lights the wildfire. Contains the introduction of Joffrey Baratheon's theme ("You Win or You Die") and the melody of the House Baratheon theme ("The King's Arrival").	3:39
9.	"I Am Hers, She Is Mine"	"Garden of Bones": A modified version is heard when Robb and Talisa meet and talk for the first time. "The Prince of Winterfell": First fully heard when Talisa and Robb kiss for the first time and make love. "Valar Morghulis": Shae and Tyrion profess their love and Robb and Talisa are married in private. "The Bear and the Maiden Fair": Robb and Talisa make love. "The Rains of Castamere": during Edmure Tully and Roslin Frey's wedding (the Red Wedding). "The Watchers on the Wall": When Maester Aemon remembers his first love and recounts it to Samwell Tarly. "The Iron Throne": Brienne finishes Jaime's entry in the White Book. The title comes from the vow used in marriages under the faith of the seven ("Father, smith, warrior, mother, maiden, crone, stranger, I am his/hers and she/he is mine from this day until the end of my days.").	2:17
10.	"Pyat Pree"	Pyat Pree's theme. "The Old Gods and the New": Daenerys finds many of her Dothraki dead and her dragons gone, and the dragons are seen being carried into the House of the Undying. "A Man Without Honor": Pyat Pree reveals himself as the captor of Daenerys's dragons, his alliance with Xaro Xohan Daxos and murders the rest of the thirteen. "Valar Morghulis": Daenerys enters the House of the Undying. A harsher rendition of "Qarth", it contains hints of the Daenerys Targaryen's theme.	2:12
11.	"Don't Die with a Clean Sword"	"Blackwater": Stannis arrives ashore and is confronted by the Hound and his men. The title comes from the Hound's line "If any man dies with a clean sword I'll rape his bloody corpse". Contains the melody of Stannis Baratheon's theme ("Warrior of Light") and the main theme.	3:22
12.	"We Are the Watchers on the Wall"	"The Night Lands": As the men of the Night's Watch are at Craster's Keep. "The Ghost of Harrenhal": Qhorin Halfhand and Lord Commander Mormont talk about the impending wildling attack. "Valar Morghulis": Ygritte shows Jon the wildling camp. The title comes from the Night's Watch oath ("I am the sword in the darkness. I am the watcher on the wall. I am the shield that guards the realms of men."). A modified version of the Night's Watch theme ("The Wall").	2:37
13.	"Pay the Iron Price"	"The Old Gods and the New": As Theon executes Rodrik Cassel. "A Man Without Honor": Theon awakens to find Osha gone, along with Bran, Rickon and Hodor. Theon and his hunting party look for Bran and Rickon. Theon decides to burn the orphans and pass them as Bran and Rickon. The corpses of the orphans are shown to the people of Winterfell, who believe them to be Bran and Rickon. A modified version of the House Greyjoy theme ("What Is Dead May Never Die").	2:32
14.	"One More Drink Before the War"	"Blackwater": After Joffrey flees to safety Tyrion assumes command of the army and encourages his troops to fight for their city. The title comes from Bronn's selfsame line. Contains the melody of the House Lannister theme (previously unheard fully).	2:05
15.	"House of the Undying"	"Valar Morghulis": Inside the House of the Undying Daenerys finds herself in the Red Keep's thrones room, the Wall and Khal Drogo's tent, in which she finds him with their son Rhaego, but heavily departs to save her dragons. Contains hints of Daenerys Targaryen's theme ("Love in the Eyes").	5:02
16.	"Stand and Fight"	"Blackwater": Tyrion himself fights outside the walls of King's Landing. The title comes from Stannis yelling desperately, "Stand and fight! Stand and fight, cowards!" after his men flee. Contains the melody of the House Lannister theme, Stannis Baratheon's theme ("Warrior of Light") and the main theme.	2:04
17.	"The Old Gods and the New"	The honor theme. Later becomes Brienne and Jaime's theme.	2:38
18.	"Mother of Dragons"	"Valar Morghulis": Daenerys gives the order to her dragons to burn Pyat Pree and release herself and them from their chains on the word of "dracarys" ("dragon fire" in high Valyrian). Daenerys apprehends Xaro and Doreah and, after finding his vault empty, locks them inside and leaves them to die, later stealing all of Xaro's gold and jewels. The title comes from one of Daenerys' various titles. Contains the melody of Daenerys Targaryen's theme ("Love in the Eyes") and the main theme. "Valar Dohaeris": Ser Barristan Selmy pledges himself to Daenerys. A shorter version is used on the main menu of season 2's DVD/Blu-ray release.	2:34
19.	"I Will Keep You Safe"	"Blackwater": Cersei believes the battle to be lost and is about to poison Tommen when the armies of House Lannister and Tyrell arrive to turn the tide of the battle, and Loras Tyrell and Tywin Lannister arrive themselves into the throne room. The title comes from Cersei's line as she is about to poison Tommen. Contains the melody of the main theme.	2:17
20.	"The Rains of Castamere" (performed by The National; written by Ramin Djawadi and George R. R. Martin)	House Lannister's theme. "Blackwater": Used in the credits sequence. The title is misspelled as "The Rains of Castomere" on official releases.	2:23
21.	"Three Blasts"	"Valar Morghulis": The arrival of the army of White Walkers. Contains the melody of the main theme and the melody later used as the White Walkers' theme ("White Walkers").	2:40
Total length:			56:00

== Credits and personnel ==
Personnel adapted from the album liner notes.

- David Benioff – liner notes
- Brandon Campbell – technical score advisor
- Ramin Djawadi – composer, primary artist, producer
- Dave Klotz – music editor
- Matt Berninger – producer
- Pavel Ciboch – copyist
- Stephen Coleman – orchestration
- Czech Film Chorus – choir/chorus
- Czech Film Orchestra – orchestra

- Aaron Dessner – producer
- Patricia Sullivan Fourstar – mastering
- Evyen J. Klean – music supervisor, producer
- D.B. Weiss – liner notes
- Janet Lopez – music coordinator
- George R.R. Martin – lyricist
- The National – band, primary artist
- Zdenka Pelikanova – music contractor
- Robert Townson – executive producer
- Catherine Wilson – technical score advisor

== Awards and nominations ==
Year	Award	Category	Nominee(s)	Result	Ref.
2012	ASCAP Awards	Top Television Series		Won	
