= A Man Without Honor =

- Game of Thrones episode
- Episode no.: Season 2 Episode 7
- Directed by: David Nutter
- Written by: David Benioff; D. B. Weiss
- Cinematography by: Martin Kenzie
- Editing by: Oral Norrie Ottey
- Original air date: May 13, 2012
- Running time: 55 minutes

Guest appearances
- Donald Sumpter as Maester Luwin; Ian Hanmore as Pyat Pree; Nicholas Blane as the Spice King; Nonso Anozie as Xaro Xhoan Daxos; Natalia Tena as Osha; Michael McElhatton as Roose Bolton; Rose Leslie as Ygritte; Gwendoline Christie as Brienne of Tarth; Oona Chaplin as Talisa Maegyr; Ralph Ineson as Dagmer Cleftjaw; Laura Pradelska as Quaithe; John Stahl as Lord Rickard Karstark; Karl Davies as Ser Alton Lannister; Forbes KB as Black Lorren; Kristian Nairn as Hodor; Steven Cole as Kovarro; Ian Whyte as Ser Gregor Clegane; Art Parkinson as Rickon Stark; Tyrone McElhennon as Torrhen Karstark

Episode chronology
← Previous "The Old Gods and the New"	Next → "The Prince of Winterfell"
- Game of Thrones season 2

"A Man Without Honor" is the seventh episode of the second season of HBO's medieval fantasy television series Game of Thrones. The 17th episode overall, "A Man Without Honor" was written by series co-creators David Benioff and D. B. Weiss, and directed by David Nutter. It first aired on HBO on May 13, 2012.

In the episode, Tywin Lannister investigates a suspicious murder at Harrenhal; Jon Snow searches for his companions beyond the Wall with his prisoner, Ygritte; Osha and Hodor help Bran and Rickon Stark escape Winterfell as Theon Greyjoy pursues them; Daenerys Targaryen searches for her stolen dragons in Qarth; and Jaime Lannister attempts to escape captivity. The name of the episode comes from Catelyn Stark's assessment of Jaime as being "a man without honor," after he kills a member of his own family to attempt escape. The episode received positive reviews from critics, who praised the performances and the scenes with Jon Snow and Ygritte.

== Plot ==
=== In King's Landing ===
Sansa awakens from a nightmare to find she has had her first period, meaning she can bear Joffrey's children. Shae tries to help conceal the blood, but the Hound sees the sheet. Cersei tells Sansa it will be impossible to love Joffrey, and to find comfort in their children instead.

Tyrion tells Cersei his doubts about Joffrey's plan to repel Stannis' fleet. Cersei confesses her belief that Joffrey is punishment for her incest with Jaime. Tyrion attempts to offer his sister solace.

=== Beyond the Wall ===
Jon searches for his companions, and captive Ygritte tells him life would be better with the wildlings. Ygritte escapes, and Jon pursues her until he is surrounded by wildlings.

=== At Harrenhal ===
Tywin orders the Mountain to find Lorch's killer, believing the murder was an attempt on his own life. Dining with Arya, Tywin deduces she is highborn.

=== In the Westerlands ===
Robb hears Alton Lannister's unfavorable reply to the peace terms brought to Cersei and, with his prisons full, orders Alton placed with Jaime. Talisa agrees to accompany Robb to the Crag for medical supplies.

Jaime and Alton talk about his family and the time Alton squired for Jaime and the time Jaime squired for Barristan Selmy. Jaime kills Alton to draw the jailer, Torrhen Karstark, into the pen, strangling him before fleeing. Jaime is recaptured, and Lord Rickard Karstark demands his head for murdering his son, but Catelyn delays the execution until Robb's return. Confronting Jaime, Catelyn calls him "a man without honor," and Jaime bitterly explains the contradictions he faced in his vows as a knight. He provokes Catelyn, who asks for Brienne's sword.

=== In Qarth ===
Daenerys has difficulty trusting Xaro, who claims he did not take her dragons. Vowing to find them, Jorah confronts Quaithe, who asks if he will betray her again, revealing him to be a spy for the crown, to which he swears to never do again. She tells him that the person who stole the dragons is with Daenerys. At a meeting of the Thirteen, Pyat Pree tells Daenerys that he has her dragons in the "House of the Undying." Xaro proclaims himself King of Qarth, revealing he made a deal with Pree the day Daenerys came to the city. Pree, having multiplied himself around the room, assassinates the remaining Thirteen, and Daenerys flees with Jorah and Kovarro.

=== At Winterfell ===
Realizing Osha has fled with Bran, Rickon, and Hodor, Theon hunts for the fugitives against Maester Luwin's wishes, following the trail of Bran and Rickon with bloodhounds. The boys arrive at the farm where they sent the orphans, not knowing that Theon is almost on them. Theon traces them to the farm, where Dagmer finds evidence that the Starks have been there. Theon sends Luwin back to Winterfell. Returning from the hunt, Theon then reveals the charred remains of two boys as a public warning. Luwin cries out in horror for Bran and Rickon, while Theon struggles to hide his remorse.

== Production ==
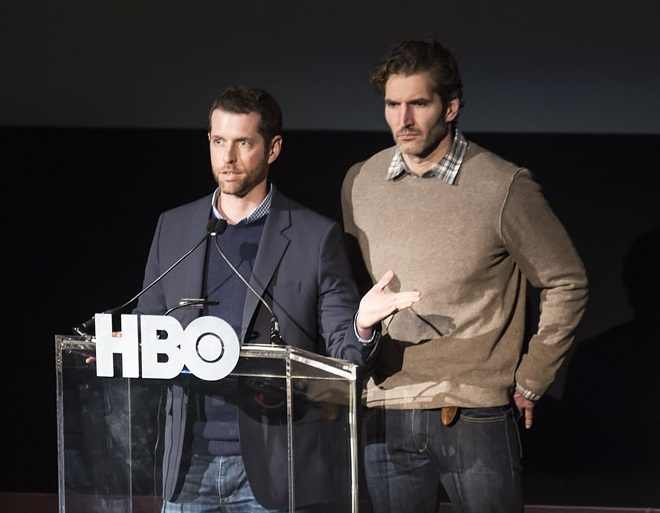
The episode was written by series co-creators David Benioff and D. B. Weiss.

The episode was written by producers David Benioff and D. B. Weiss, their fourth of six scripts for the second season. This episode adapts content from the second novel, A Clash of Kings, chapters Theon IV, Sansa IV and parts of Catelyn V and Catelyn VII.

== Reception ==
=== Ratings ===
"A Man Without Honor" achieved a viewership of 3.69 million in the United States in its initial telecast on HBO. In the United Kingdom, the episode was seen by 0.935 million viewers on Sky Atlantic, being the channel's highest-rated broadcast that week.

=== Critical reception ===
The episode received positive reviews from critics. Review aggregator site Rotten Tomatoes surveyed 12 reviews of the episode and judged 96% of them to be positive, with an average score of 8.85 out of 10. The website's critical consensus reads, "Quieter and more meditative than previous episodes, 'A Man Without Honor' is bolstered by incredible performances and a welcome return to an unlikely but surprisingly satisfying onscreen duo." IGN's Matt Fowler gave the episode a 9 out of 10, noting that "While 'A Man Without Honor' didn't have as many big, striking scenes as some of the past few episodes, it made up for its lack of face-melting moments with some absolutely fantastic one-on-one scenes." The A.V. Club's Emily VanDerWerff gave it an A−.
