= Valar Dohaeris =

- Game of Thrones episode
- Episode no.: Season 3 Episode 1
- Directed by: Daniel Minahan
- Written by: David Benioff; D. B. Weiss
- Cinematography by: Jonathan Freeman
- Editing by: Frances Parker
- Original air date: March 31, 2013
- Running time: 54 minutes

Guest appearances
- Ciarán Hinds as Mance Rayder; Michael McElhatton as Roose Bolton; Ian McElhinney as Ser Barristan Selmy; Finn Jones as Loras Tyrell; Anton Lesser as Qyburn; Kristofer Hivju as Tormund Giantsbane; Esme Bianco as Ros; John Stahl as Rickard Karstark; Lucian Msamati as Salladhor Saan; Mark Stanley as Grenn; Ben Crompton as Eddison Tollett; Daniel Portman as Podrick Payne; Dan Hildebrand as Kraznys mo Nakloz; Nathalie Emmanuel as Missandei; Luke Barnes as Rast; Edward Dogliani as Rattleshirt; Ian Beattie as Ser Meryn Trant; Ian Whyte as the Giant; Elisa Lasowski as Mirelle

Episode chronology
← Previous "Valar Morghulis"	Next → "Dark Wings, Dark Words"
- Game of Thrones season 3

"Valar Dohaeris" is the third season premiere episode of the HBO fantasy television series Game of Thrones. Written by executive producers David Benioff and D. B. Weiss, and directed by Daniel Minahan, it aired on March 31, 2013.

The premiere continued where the second season left off, with the Lannisters consolidating their power at King's Landing in the aftermath of the Battle of the Blackwater. Meanwhile, Jon Snow meets the "King beyond the Wall," and Daenerys leaves Qarth for Slaver's Bay.

The episode's title translates to "all men must serve" in the High Valyrian language in George R. R. Martin's A Song of Ice and Fire novels, which the series adapts. The title mirrors that of season 2's finale, "Valar Morghulis" – "all men must die.”

The episode received mostly positive reviews, with many praising its performances and strong ability to reintroduce many of the series' plotlines. It set a new ratings record for the series, and was one of the most torrented episodes for an HBO series.

== Plot ==
=== Beyond the Wall ===
The White Walkers’ attack leaves few Night's Watch survivors. Samwell Tarly is saved by the direwolf Ghost and Lord Commander Jeor Mormont, who reprimands Sam for failing to warn of the approaching army and orders the survivors back to the Wall.

At the wildling camp, Jon Snow mistakes Tormund Giantsbane for the King-beyond-the-Wall, but Mance Rayder reveals himself and questions Jon's motives for deserting the Night's Watch. Jon earns Mance's approval, describing his disgust at Mormont’s knowledge of Craster sacrificing his sons and declaring that he wants "to fight for the side that fights for the living".

=== In King's Landing ===
Newly knighted Ser Bronn returns to the service of Tyrion Lannister, whose father Tywin, new Hand of the King, agrees to recognize Tyrion's accomplishments during the Battle of Blackwater but refuses to name him heir to Casterly Rock and viciously insults him.

Petyr Baelish offers to smuggle Sansa Stark out of King's Landing. Ros tells Shae to look out for Sansa, especially when dealing with Baelish.

King Joffrey Baratheon and his betrothed Lady Margaery Tyrell travel through Flea Bottom, when Margaery exits her litter to visit an orphanage as Joffrey hides. At dinner, Joffrey trades insults with his mother, in contrast to the harmonious Tyrells.

=== In Blackwater Bay ===
Stranded Davos Seaworth is rescued by the pirate Salladhor Saan, and recounts seeing his son Matthos die. Salladhor reveals he is leaving the service of Stannis, who is in seclusion at Dragonstone and will only speak with Melisandre, who is burning people alive because they are “servants of darkness.” Davos, intending to kill Melisandre, persuades Salladhor to bring him to Stannis.

=== At Dragonstone ===
Discovering Stannis is indifferent to his survival and that Melisandre believes him responsible for Stannis’ defeat, Davos tries to attack Melisandre but is thrown in the dungeons.

=== At Harrenhal ===
Robb Stark and his forces discover Gregor Clegane has abandoned Harrenhal and slaughtered the prisoners. Lord Roose Bolton sympathizes with Lord Rickard Karstark's frustration that Catelyn Stark let Jaime Lannister go, assuring Karstark that his best hunter is after Jaime. Robb finds a survivor, Qyburn.

=== In Astapor ===
Reaching Astapor in Slaver's Bay with her fast-growing dragons, Daenerys Targaryen considers buying an army of the "Unsullied", renowned eunuch soldiers. A Qarth warlock masked as a young girl attempts to assassinate Daenerys with a scorpion-like creature, but is thwarted by Ser Barristan Selmy, Kingsguard to Daenerys' father, who swears his allegiance to her.

== Production ==
=== Writing ===
The episode was written by showrunners David Benioff and D. B. Weiss. It was based mainly on the first chapters of A Storm of Swords, the third novel in George R. R. Martin's A Song of Ice and Fire series. Specifically, it adapts material from chapters Samwell I, Jon I, Davos I, Davos II, Tyrion I, Daenerys I, Davos III, and Daenerys II from A Storm of Swords and chapter Daenerys V of A Clash of Kings.

Some of the twists that open the third book were used in the previous season's finale (mainly Robb's marriage and the White Walkers attacking the Night's Watch). Conversely, Barristan Selmy saving Daenerys from the manticore was borrowed from her last chapter in the second book A Clash of Kings.

=== Casting ===
"Valar Dohaeris" introduces the Irish actor Ciarán Hinds as the Wildling leader and Night's Watch deserter Mance Rayder, one of the latest Season 3 roles to be cast. The producers explained that casting Mance was a great challenge because he was someone who had become "King beyond the Wall" not by birthright but by convincing all the tribes to unite under his leadership. They had to find an actor with the charisma required to portray this. Unusual for a production such as Game of Thrones, the first scene Hinds filmed was the first one where his character appears: the meeting with Jon Snow at his tent.

The season premiere also marks the first appearance of guest stars Kristofer Hivju as the Wildling Tormund Giantsbane, Nathalie Emmanuel as the slave Missandei, and Anton Lesser as the wounded prisoner Qyburn. The three castings were announced at San Diego Comic-Con in July 2012.

With this episode, Rose Leslie (Ygritte) and Oona Chaplin (Talisa) are promoted to series regulars, after guest starring in the second season. After being absent for the entire second season, Ian McElhinney returns as Ser Barristan Selmy. Actor Ian Whyte, previously cast as a White Walker in the first season, was recast as the huge Ser Gregor Clegane in the second and appears in the episode as the giant seen in the wildlings camp.

=== Valyrian ===
David J. Peterson, who created the Dothraki language for the first season of the show, was entrusted by the producers to design a new constructed language to depict Valyrian, the tongue of the fallen Valyrian Empire. After immersing himself in the fictional background, Peterson ended up devising two languages: High Valyrian, the oldest form that was spoken at the height of the Empire and that in its purest form still exists as a language of scholarship and refinement, and the Slaver's Bay variety of Low Valyrian, a creolized version that is spoken in local dialects around the Slaver's Bay. The relationship between the two languages would be similar to the one between Classical Latin and Vulgar Latin.

To translate sentences in Low Valyrian such as the ones spoken by Kraznys mo Nakloz and Missandei during the episode, Peterson would first write them into High Valyrian, and then apply a series of phonological, semantic and grammatical changes to the text.

=== Filming locations ===
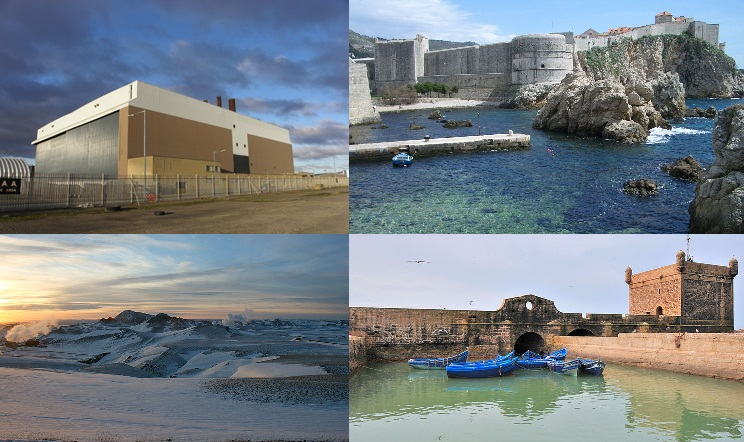
The episode used locations in four different countries: The Paint Hall in Belfast, the City Walls of Dubrovnik, Mývatn and Vinderbelgjarfjall, and the Old Fort at Essaouira.

The production continued to use the Paint Hall studios in Belfast for most interior shoots. The scene of Daenerys at sea was filmed at the Linen Mill Film & Television Studios at Banbridge, using the same ship built for Theon's arrival in Pyke and used as Stannis' flagship in season 2. The beach of Downhill Strand returned as the island of Dragonstone.

The old city of Dubrovnik was again used for the exterior shots of the capital, King's Landing. Tyrion and Bronn are seen walking on the famed city walls, and the scene where Lord Baelish visits Sansa at the docks was filmed in the old port between Fort Lovrijenac and the Pila Gates.

Also repeating from last season, the scenes beyond the Wall were filmed in Iceland. The Wildling's camp was built in a new location, on a lava field in the Mývatn Lake region in the North, a few hours from the town of Akureyri. Building the camp took months of work from the art department and weeks of construction by the local crew. Although the scenes at the Icelandic exteriors were filmed at minus 11 degrees Celsius, the interior of Mance's tent was filmed on one of the soundstages at the Paint Hall. The fires burning inside the tent made the set very hot, and the actors suffered the heat wearing heavy furs designed for Arctic climates.

To depict the slaver city of Astapor, the production used the Moroccan city of Essaouira. The Unsullied are introduced in the city ramparts of Skala de la Ville, the 18th-century sea bastion that runs along the northern cliffs, and during the closing scene when Barristan reveals himself, the Genoese-built citadel by the harbour can be clearly seen.

=== Dedication ===
The episode is dedicated to the memory of cinematographer Martin Kenzie, who worked in the photography department and died of cancer while the third season was being filmed on July 16, 2012.

== Reception ==
=== Ratings ===
"Valar Dohaeris"'s first airing was seen by 4.4 million viewers; the total rose to 6.7 million viewers once the two repeats of the night are taken into account. Both figures represented a viewership record for the show. In the United Kingdom, the episode was seen by 1.173 million viewers on Sky Atlantic, being the channel's highest-rated broadcast that week.

=== Critical reception ===
The episode received critical acclaim. Review aggregator Rotten Tomatoes surveyed 21 reviews of the episode and judged 100% of them to be positive with an average score of 7.5 out of 10. The website's critical consensus reads, "'Valar Dohaeris' overextends itself trying to reintroduce a multitude of characters and plotlines, but is strengthened by its brilliantly acted two-person scenes (and three growing baby dragons)." In an advance review for The Daily Beast, Jace Lacob wrote that the season premiere lacks "energy and intensity, but provides a necessary foundation," and that the season, like the novel it is based on, "takes a little to get going." Matt Fowler, writing for IGN, gave the episode an 8.6/10, writing that "while understandably not showing us everyone, Game of Thrones returned in fine form with dragons, zombies and giants." Neela Dabnath of The Independent felt that "Valar Dohaeris" was a strong start to Season 3 and "deftly picked up the various story strands from the last season ... even if it was just a series of brief check-in." She also praised the show for taking "creative liberties which always pay off in bucket loads," commenting on how this can "add to Martin’s world and flesh it out in new ways."

Forbes.com writer Erik Kain stated he felt "Valar Dohaeris" did "exactly what it needed to do," by bringing the viewers "back up to speed on the broader conflict and the various minor character conflicts and positioning for power. The ball hasn’t really been moved forward at all, but our feet are on sturdy ground to move forward." He did however express some disappointment over how some elements of the episode differed from its source material in regards to the reintroduction of the character Barristan Selmy and the apparent absence of the character Strong Belwas. Reviewing the episode for The Guardian, Sarah Hughes felt that "Valar Dohaeris" "didn't really feel like a season opener," and that the opening scene was "a little disorientating." However she enjoyed the scenes in King's Landing and lauded Stephen Dillane's brief performance. Commenting on the Daenerys' plot, she felt her storyline was advancing quite quickly. She also felt that the Barristan Selmy reveal was handled well as; "there are certain conventions that work better on page than screen and the hidden identity trope is one of them. By getting the reveal out of the way early, Benioff and Weiss can concentrate on the potential rivalry between Barristan and Jorah."

=== Awards and nominations ===
Year	Award	Category	Nominee(s)	Result
2013	Primetime Creative Arts Emmy Awards	Outstanding Art Direction for a Single-Camera Series	Gemma Jackson, Frank Walsh, and Tina Jones	Nominated
2013	Primetime Creative Arts Emmy Awards	Outstanding Prosthetic Makeup for a Series, Miniseries, Movie or a Special	Paul Engelen, Conor O'Sullivan, and Rob Trenton	Nominated
2013	Primetime Creative Arts Emmy Awards	Outstanding Special Visual Effects	Doug Campbell, Rainer Gombos, Juri Stanossek, Sven Martin, Steve Kullback, Jan Fiedler, Chris Stenner, Tobias Mannewitz, Thilo Ewers, and Adam Chazen	Won
2013	Hollywood Post Alliance Awards	Outstanding Visual Effects – Television	Joe Bauer and Jabbar Raisani, Jörn Grosshans and Sven Martin, and Doug Campbell	Won
2014	ADG Excellence in Production Design Award	One-Hour Single Camera Television Series	Gemma Jackson	Won
2014	American Society of Cinematographers	One-Hour Episodic Television Series	Jonathan Freeman	Won
2014	Visual Effects Society	Outstanding Visual Effects in a Broadcast Program	Steve Kullback, Joe Bauer, Jörn Großhans, Sven Martin	Won
