= The Prince of Winterfell =

- Game of Thrones episode
- Episode no.: Season 2 Episode 8
- Directed by: Alan Taylor
- Written by: David Benioff; D. B. Weiss
- Cinematography by: Jonathan Freeman
- Editing by: Frances Parker
- Original air date: May 20, 2012
- Running time: 53 minutes

Guest appearances
- Donald Sumpter as Maester Luwin; Natalia Tena as Osha; Oona Chaplin as Talisa Mygaer; Michael McElhatton as Roose Bolton; Tom Wlaschiha as Jaqen H'ghar; Rose Leslie as Ygritte; Simon Armstrong as Qhorin Halfhand; Gemma Whelan as Yara Greyjoy; Joe Dempsie as Gendry; Gwendoline Christie as Brienne of Tarth; Ralph Ineson as Dagmer Cleftjaw; Ian Gelder as Kevan Lannister; John Stahl as Rickard Karstark; Mark Stanley as Grenn; Ben Crompton as Dolorous Edd; Ben Hawkey as Hot Pie; Esmé Bianco as Ros; Andy Beckwith as Rorge; Steven Cole as Kovarro; Edward Dogliani as Rattleshirt; Kristian Nairn as Hodor; Gerard Jordan as Biter; Art Parkinson as Rickon Stark; Daniel Portman as Podrick Payne; Ian Whyte as Ser Gregor Clegane

Episode chronology
← Previous "A Man Without Honor"	Next → "Blackwater"
- Game of Thrones season 2

"The Prince of Winterfell" is the eighth episode of the second season of HBO's medieval fantasy television series Game of Thrones, and the 18th overall. The episode was directed by Alan Taylor and written by series creators and executive producers David Benioff and D. B. Weiss. It first aired on May 20, 2012.

The title of the episode refers to Theon Greyjoy as ruler of Winterfell after disposing of the Stark children. It received positive reviews from critics, who mainly praised the character moments and development.

== Plot ==
=== In King's Landing ===
Tyrion and Bronn plan the defense of King's Landing with the aid of old texts. Varys arrives to compliment Bronn on his leadership of the gold cloaks.

When Tyrion is accused of plotting to kill King Joffrey, Cersei mistakenly kidnaps Ros instead of Shae, and Tyrion swears to Cersei that she will pay for her actions.

Joffrey's inexperience and arrogance leave Tyrion fearful for the coming battle. Varys informs Tyrion that Daenerys is alive with three dragons but Tyrion suggests to focus on one problem at a time.

=== In The Narrow Sea ===
Planning the siege of King's Landing, Stannis and Davos reminisce about Robert's Rebellion. Stannis remains bitter that Renly was given Storm's End, and vows to make Davos his Hand once he takes the Iron Throne.

=== At Harrenhal ===
Tywin's meeting with his council discusses the siege of King's Landing and what will be done about Stannis and the Starks attacking Casterly Rock. As Tywin departs to face Robb's army, Arya is unable to find Jaqen H'ghar in time for him to kill Tywin, and instead forces him to help her escape. That night, Jaqen kills the castle's guards, allowing Arya, Gendry, and Hot Pie to escape.

=== In the Westerlands ===
Robb returns from the Crag with Talisa to learn Jaime has escaped. Catelyn admits that Brienne is escorting Jaime to King's Landing to trade for Sansa and Arya, and Robb has Catelyn placed under guard. Roose Bolton assures Robb that Bolton's bastard son is nearing Winterfell; Robb orders mercy be shown to any Ironborn except Theon to persuade Theon's men to betray him. Talisa enters Robb's tent and talks at length about her brother and leaving highborn society in Volantis. Robb confesses to Talisa that he does not want to marry Frey's daughter, and they have sex in his tent.

=== Beyond the Wall ===
Ygritte and her companions present Jon to the Lord of Bones, whom she convinces to spare Jon's life, saying Mance Rayder will want to meet Eddard Stark's bastard. Captured Qhorin Halfhand tells Jon to "defect" to Mance's army to learn his plans.

At the Fist of the First Men, Sam and Grenn discover an ancient Night's Watch cloak, containing a strange horn and a cache of dragonglass weapons.

=== In Qarth ===
Daenerys refuses to flee Qarth for Astapor without her dragons, and Jorah reluctantly takes her to the House of the Undying.

=== At Winterfell ===
Theon orders the messenger ravens killed to conceal Bran and Rickon's deaths. Yara Greyjoy arrives to bring Theon home, but he refuses to abandon Winterfell.

Following Osha to the crypts beneath Winterfell, Maester Luwin discovers Bran and Rickon are alive. Luwin deduces Theon's men murdered a farming family and burned their sons in the Stark boys' stead, which Bran overhears.

== Production ==
=== Writing ===
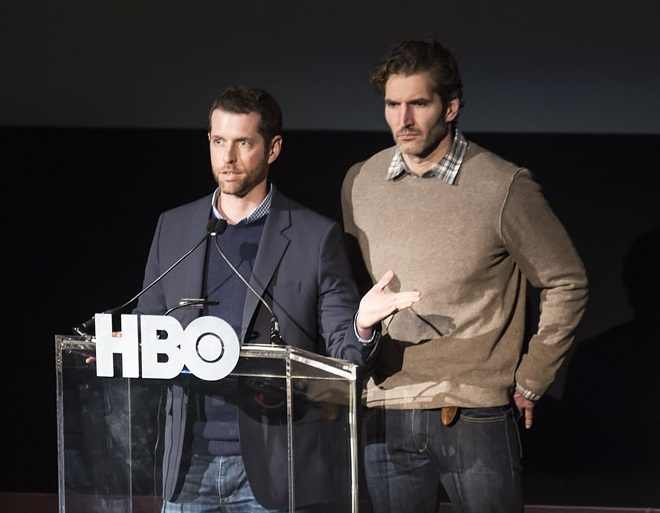
The episode was written by series co-creators David Benioff and D. B. Weiss.

The episode was written by executive producers David Benioff and D. B. Weiss, based on the original work of George R. R. Martin. "The Prince of Winterfell" adapts the content of chapters Arya IX, Tyrion XII, Theon V (48, 55 and 57) from A Clash of Kings, and also parts Jaime I and Catelyn I (2 and 3) from A Storm of Swords.

Among the added material there are the relationship between Talisa and Robb (which in the books happen offscreen and in an entirely different context) and the Qarth plot (which is still only loosely based on the books). Other changes include Arya using her third "death" to flee Harrenhal instead of contributing to the fall of the castle to Bolton's Northmen, revealing the hidden cache of “dragonglass” found after Jon's departure, and having the wildlings capture Qhorin Halfhand alive.

=== Casting ===
Edward Dogliani joins the guest cast of the show playing the wildling leader Rattleshirt, also known as "the Lord of Bones".

== Reception ==
=== Ratings ===
The first airing of "The Prince of Winterfell" matched the series high ratings with 3.86 million viewers and a 2.0 share among the 18–49 demographic. The second airing brought an additional 1.04 million viewers and a 0.5 share. In the United Kingdom, the episode was seen by 0.892 million viewers on Sky Atlantic, being the channel's highest-rated broadcast that week.

=== Critical reception ===
The episode received critical acclaim.

On the review aggregator website Rotten Tomatoes, 100% of 25 critics' reviews are positive, with an average rating of 9.7/10. The website's consensus reads: "Though it's mostly concerned with moving its pieces into position before the finale, 'The Prince of Winterfell' is a pleasantly subdued episode that makes the most of its character moments." Emily St. James for The A.V. Club gave it a B+. Matt Fowler for IGN gave it a rating of 8 out of 10.

=== Accolades ===
This episode won the Primetime Emmy Award for Outstanding Costumes for a Series.
