= Dark Wings, Dark Words =

- Game of Thrones episode
- Episode no.: Season 3 Episode 2
- Directed by: Daniel Minahan
- Written by: Vanessa Taylor
- Cinematography by: Jonathan Freeman
- Editing by: Frances Parker
- Original air date: April 7, 2013
- Running time: 57 minutes

Guest appearances
- Diana Rigg as Olenna Tyrell; Ciarán Hinds as Mance Rayder; Mackenzie Crook as Orell; Paul Kaye as Thoros of Myr; Gwendoline Christie as Brienne of Tarth; Noah Taylor as Locke; Natalia Tena as Osha; Michael McElhatton as Roose Bolton; Iwan Rheon as Boy; Kristofer Hivju as Tormund Giantsbane; Finn Jones as Loras Tyrell; Thomas Brodie Sangster as Jojen Reed; Ellie Kendrick as Meera Reed; Ben Hawkey as Hot Pie; John Stahl as Rickard Karstark; Philip McGinley as Anguy; Mark Stanley as Grenn; Ben Crompton as Eddison Tollett; Luke Barnes as Rast; Kristian Nairn as Hodor; Art Parkinson as Rickon Stark

Episode chronology
← Previous "Valar Dohaeris"	Next → "Walk of Punishment"
- Game of Thrones season 3

"Dark Wings, Dark Words" is the second episode of the third season of HBO's medieval fantasy television series Game of Thrones. The 22nd episode of the series overall, it was directed by Daniel Minahan and written by Vanessa Taylor. It first aired on HBO on April 7, 2013.

In the episode, Robb Stark receives word that Winterfell has been razed by the Ironborn, and learns that Bran and Rickon have disappeared. Robb's army takes a detour to Riverrun to attend the funeral of Hoster Tully. Theon Greyjoy is taken captive and tortured at Winterfell. Brienne of Tarth continues to escort an imprisoned Jaime Lannister to King's Landing. In the North, Jon Snow struggles to gain the trust of Mance Rayder, as the Night's Watch march back to the Wall. The title of the episode refers to an in-universe proverb about messenger ravens, referring to the fact that urgently delivered messages are often bad news.

The episode marks the first appearance of Olenna Tyrell (Diana Rigg), Jojen Reed (Thomas Brodie Sangster), and Meera Reed (Ellie Kendrick). It received a mostly positive critical response, with critics singling out the introductions of new characters.

== Plot ==
=== In King's Landing ===
Margaery and her grandmother Lady Olenna persuade Sansa to tell them the truth of King Joffrey's cruelty.

After discussing his bride-to-be with Cersei, Joffrey invites Margaery to his chamber and questions her about her last husband, Renly Baratheon, and shows off his new crossbow.

Shae warns Tyrion that Lord Baelish has taken an interest in Sansa.

=== Beyond the Wall ===
Mance Rayder continues to be distrustful of Jon, and speaks with Orell, a 'warg' capable of seeing through the eyes of animals, who tells him that he has seen the aftermath of the battle at the Fist of the First Men.

Marching to the Wall, Sam falls from exhaustion, and Jeor Mormont orders Rast, who had been taunting Sam, to ensure he reaches the Wall alive and if he doesn't, Jeor will have him killed.

=== In the North ===
Heading north with Hodor, Osha, and Rickon, Bran has another strange dream. While Hodor and Rickon are away, Osha suspects someone is following them and leaves to investigate. Bran is confronted by Jojen Reed, the boy from his dream and a seer like Bran. Accompanied by his sister, Meera, Jojen says they have been searching for Bran. While travelling, Bran and Jojen discuss him being a warg and what the three eyed raven is.

Theon Greyjoy has been taken captive, and despite answering all questions truthfully, he continues to be tortured. A young man, who claims to be sent by Yara, promises to aid Theon.

=== In the Riverlands ===
Robb receives news of the death of his grandfather, Lord Hoster Tully, and that Winterfell has been razed by the Iron Islanders but Bran and Rickon have not been found. He and Catelyn depart for Riverrun for her father's funeral; Lord Karstark voices his displeasure with the funeral distraction. Catelyn discusses her children with Talisa, and admits that she feels responsible for what is happening to them all.

Travelling north, Arya, Gendry, and Hot Pie are brought to an inn by a group led by Thoros of Myr, fighting for the Brotherhood without Banners. Another Brotherhood party arrive with a captive Sandor "The Hound" Clegane, who recognizes Arya and announces her true identity.

A farmer warns Brienne and Jaime of the danger in traveling the Kingsroad. Jaime warns Brienne that the farmer must be killed, but she refuses. While crossing a bridge, Jaime seizes one of Brienne's swords and duels with her, but she gains the upper hand. They are taken captive by Locke, a bannerman of Lord Roose Bolton, aided by the farmer who had recognized Jaime.

== Production ==
=== Writing ===
"Dark Wings, Dark Words" was written by co-writer Vanessa Taylor, who had previously written the episodes "Garden of Bones" and "The Old Gods and the New" for the show's second season. This episode adapts the following chapters from George R. R. Martin's A Storm of Swords: "Bran I", "Sansa I", "Jon II", "Arya I", "Arya II", "Arya V", "Jaime II" and "Jaime III".

=== Casting ===
With this episode, Joe Dempsie (Gendry) is promoted to series regular, after guest starring in the first and second season. This episode also marks the first appearances of Diana Rigg (as Lady Olenna Tyrell), Mackenzie Crook (as Orell), Paul Kaye (as Thoros of Myr), Thomas Brodie-Sangster (as Jojen Reed), Ellie Kendrick (as Meera Reed), Philip McGinley (as Anguy), Noah Taylor (as Locke), and Iwan Rheon (as the cleaning boy attending Theon, who would later on in the series be revealed as Ramsay Bolton).

== Reception ==
=== Ratings ===
"Dark Wings, Dark Words"'s first airing was seen by 4.27 million viewers. Taking into account the viewers of the later repeat, the figures rose to 5.54 million. In the United Kingdom, the episode was seen by 0.988 million viewers on Sky Atlantic, being the channel's second highest-rated broadcast that week.

=== Critical reception ===
"Dark Wings, Dark Words" received positive reviews from television critics.

On the review aggregator website Rotten Tomatoes, 89% of 38 critics' reviews are positive, with an average rating of 8.1/10. The website's consensus reads: "Burdened with character and plot reintroductions, 'Dark Wings, Dark Words' starts slow before revving up and delving into the real intrigues of the season." IGN's Matt Fowler gave the episode an 8.5/10, writing "Not many big moments in this week's Game of Thrones, but a lot of new characters came into play." David Sims, reviewing for The A.V. Club, rated the episode with a B+ for newbies. Emily VanDerWerff, rating for experts, also gave the episode a B+.
