= Ian Whyte (actor) =

Welsh actor (born 1971)

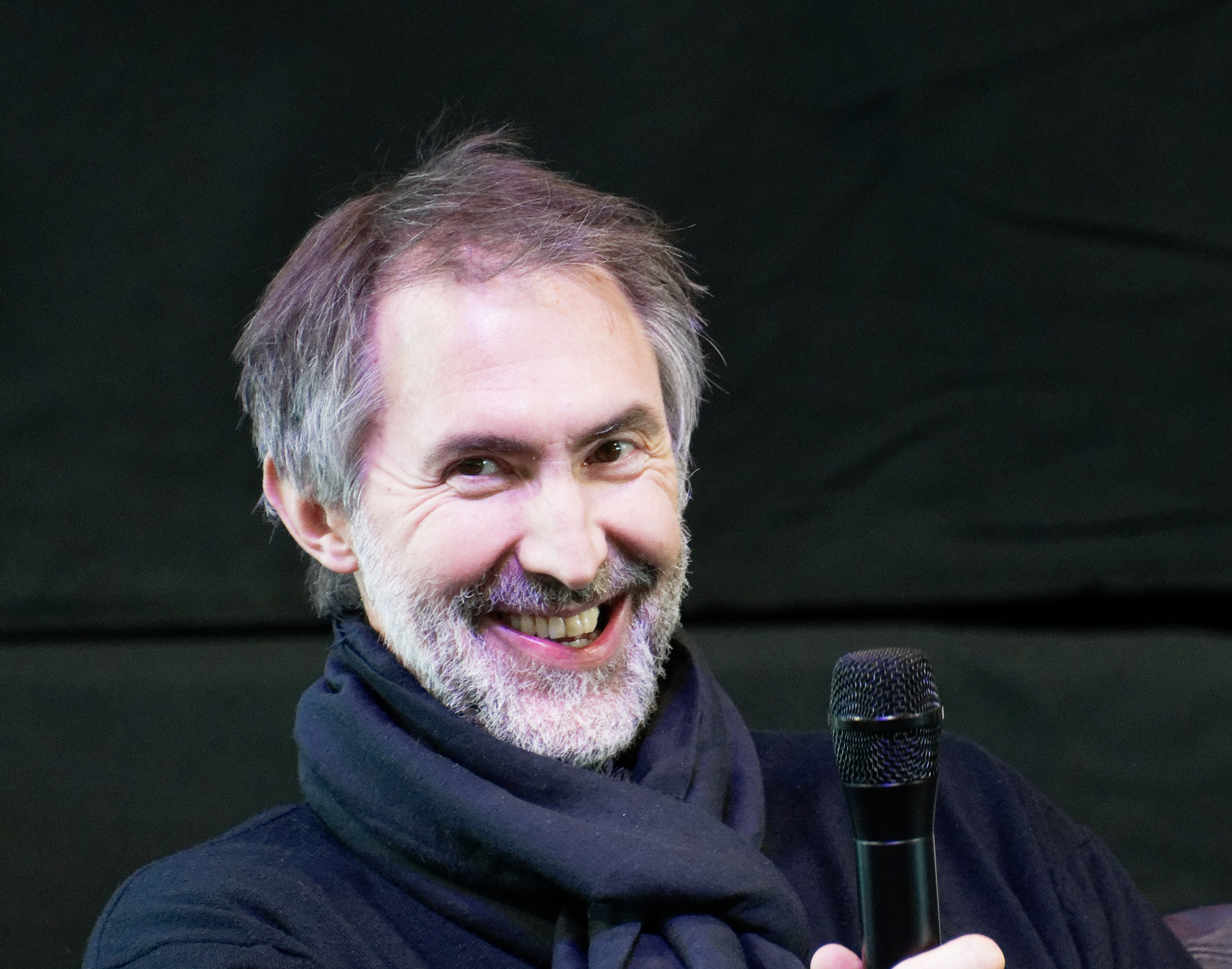
- Whyte in 2024
- Born: 17 September 1971 (age 55); Bangor, Gwynedd, Wales
- Occupation: Actor
- Years active: 2004–present
- Height: 7 ft 1 in (2.16 m)
- Spouse: Amy Whyte
- Children: 1

Ian Stuart Whyte (born 17 September 1971) is a Welsh actor, stuntman and former professional basketball player. He is best known for his roles as Predators in the Alien vs. Predator film series, Sheikh Suleiman in the 2010 remake of Clash of the Titans, The Last Engineer in Prometheus, as well as various characters in the HBO fantasy series Game of Thrones.

== Career ==
Raised in Brighton, Whyte began his career as a professional basketball player with clubs in several countries, including FC Porto where he was a Portuguese champion in 1996–97, and culminating in a six-year spell with the Newcastle Eagles. He also collected 80 caps for the England national team.

After his retirement from basketball in 2003, he began his second career as a stuntman and actor.

Whyte is best known for portraying Predators in the movies Alien vs. Predator and Aliens vs. Predator: Requiem, in particular Wolf in the latter.

In 2010, Whyte played Sheikh Sulieman in Clash of the Titans.

Whyte portrayed one of the "Engineer" aliens seen in Ridley Scott's 2012 science fiction film, Prometheus.

He has portrayed various characters requiring a physically tall actor in the HBO series Game of Thrones, including White Walkers in season 1 and season 2 and a giant in the opening episode of season 3. For these roles he was unrecognisable under make-up and computer effects. In season 2, he also had a speaking role as Gregor Clegane. In season 5 and season 6, Whyte portrayed the giant Wun Wun. He later played a giant wight in episode 3 of Season 8.

== Personal life ==
Whyte was born in Bangor, Gwynedd, Wales. He is 7 ft 1 in (216 cm) tall. He is married to Amy Whyte and has one son.

== Filmography ==
List of acting performances in film and television
Year	Film/Television show	Role	Notes
2004	Alien vs. Predator	Scar; Celtic; Chopper; Ancient Predator	
2005	Harry Potter and the Goblet of Fire	Olympe Maxime	with Frances de la Tour
2007	Aliens vs. Predator: Requiem	Wolf	
2009	Solomon Kane	The Devil's Reaper	
2009	Dragonball Evolution	Oozaru	
2010	Outcast	The Beast	
2010	Clash of the Titans	Sheikh Suleiman	
2011–2019	Game of Thrones	White Walker	Episodes "Winter Is Coming", "The Night Lands"
2011–2019	Game of Thrones	Gregor Clegane	Episodes "Garden of Bones", "A Man Without Honor", "The Prince of Winterfell"
2011–2019	Game of Thrones	Dongo the Doomed	Episodes "Valar Dohaeris", "The Watchers on the Wall", "The Children"
2011–2019	Game of Thrones	Wun Weg Wun Dar Wun	Episodes "Hardhome", "The Dance of Dragons", "Home", "The Broken Man", "Battle of the Bastards"
2011–2019	Game of Thrones	Giant Wights	Episodes "Dragonstone", "The Dragon and the Wolf", "The Long Night"
2012	Prometheus	Last Engineer	
2013	Don't Move	The Demon	Short film
2013	The Beachcomber	Cluny Barr	
2013	Harrigan	Ronnie	
2014	Blood Moon	Skinwalker	
2014	The Scorpion King 4: Quest for Power	Prince Duan	
2014	Hercules	Bessi Warrior Leader	
2015	Star Wars: The Force Awakens	Crusher Roodown, Bollie Prindel	Also Peter Mayhew's stunt double
2016	Rogue One	Moroff	
2017	Star Wars: The Last Jedi	Bollie Prindel	
2020	The Reckoning	Lucifer	
2021	The Irregulars	Plague Doctor	
2022	The Northman	The Mound Dweller	
2022	Andor	Vetch	
2024	Ghostbusters: Frozen Empire	Garraka (puppeteer)	

== See also ==
- List of tallest people
