= The Watchers on the Wall =

- Game of Thrones episode
- Episode no.: Season 4 Episode 9
- Directed by: Neil Marshall
- Written by: David Benioff; D. B. Weiss
- Cinematography by: David Franco
- Editing by: Katie Weiland
- Original air date: June 8, 2014
- Running time: 50 minutes

Guest appearances
- Peter Vaughan as Maester Aemon; Owen Teale as Alliser Thorne; Dominic Carter as Janos Slynt; Mark Stanley as Grenn; Ben Crompton as Edd Tollett; Yuri Kolokolnikov as Styr; Josef Altin as Pyp; Brenock O'Connor as Olly; Joseph Gatt as a Thenn Warg; Ian Whyte as Dongo; Neil Fingleton as Mag Mar Tun Doh Weg

Episode chronology
← Previous "The Mountain and the Viper"	Next → "The Children"
- Game of Thrones season 4

"The Watchers on the Wall" is the ninth and penultimate episode of the fourth season of HBO's medieval fantasy television series Game of Thrones. The 39th episode overall, it was written by series co-creators David Benioff and D. B. Weiss, and directed by Neil Marshall. It first aired on HBO on June 8, 2014.

Like season two's "Blackwater" (also directed by Marshall), the episode focuses exclusively on one storyline: the wildling assault on Castle Black at the Wall, and the Night's Watch defense, led by Ser Alliser Thorne and Jon Snow. In the episode, Mance Rayder's army attacks Castle Black from both sides as the undermanned Night's Watch struggle to fight them off; Ygritte is eager for revenge against Jon; and Gilly hides from the battle.

The episode achieved a viewership of 6.95 million during its initial airing in the United States, and received acclaim from critics and viewers, highlighting the episode's battle sequence and the emotional depth. For the episode, Neil Marshall was nominated for the Primetime Emmy Award for Outstanding Directing for a Drama Series.

== Plot ==
As they keep watch on the Wall, Jon and Samwell discuss his relationship with Ygritte during his time with the wildlings. In the library of Castle Black, Sam and Maester Aemon discuss Gilly, who later arrives at the castle with her baby. With a massive forest fire to the north, the brothers continue preparations for battle. Sam finds Gilly shelter in the kitchen and promises her that he will not die. Their reunion is cut short by horns signaling that Mance Rayder's army has arrived.

At a nearby camp, a Thenn warg scouts the Wall using an owl, while Ygritte declares that Jon is hers to kill. Ygritte reports that the castle's entrance is undermanned, and Styr orders the attack. As Thorne readies the archers, another alarm informs him the castle is being attacked from both sides. Thorne leaves Slynt in charge and heads down but Slynt proves incapable and Grenn tricks him into also going to the castle. Two giants and a woolly mammoth then attempt to open the outer gate and Jon sends Grenn and others to defend the inner gate. At the castle, Thorne is wounded by Tormund. Pyp shoots at the wildlings with crossbows while Sam reloads for him, but Pyp is killed by Ygritte.

Sam ascends the Wall and informs Jon that the courtyard is overrun, and Jon leaves Edd in charge. Descending, he leads the remaining Night's Watch, and has his direwolf released. Jon kills Styr and is confronted by Ygritte. She hesitates, and Olly shoots her in the back. As she dies in Jon's arms, they reminisce. Tormund, hit by several arrows, is captured on Jon's orders. Above, Edd leads a successful defense and the wildling army withdraws.

In the morning, Jon tells Sam that he will go north to kill Mance. They find Grenn and his men have died killing a giant, and Jon tells Sam to have their bodies burned. Jon tells Sam to mind his sword before departing.

== Production ==
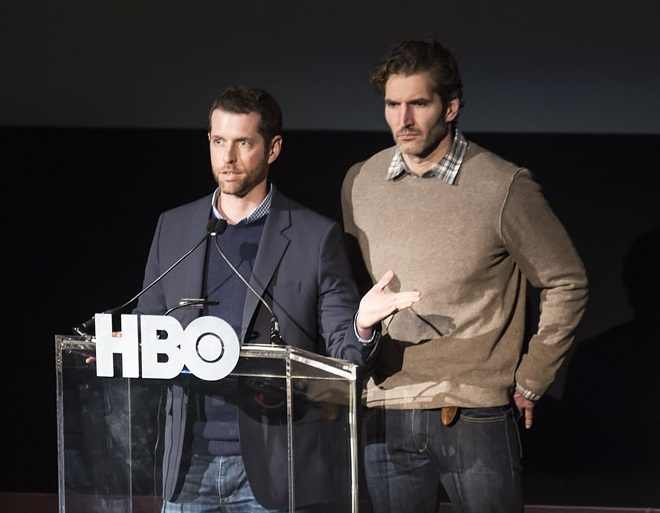
The episode was written by series co-creators David Benioff and D. B. Weiss.

This episode adapts content from the A Storm of Swords chapters Jon VII, Jon VIII and Jon IX.

"The Watchers on the Wall" marks the return of director Neil Marshall, whose previous episode for the show as director was "Blackwater". Marshall also makes a cameo appearance in the episode as an archer on the Wall.

== Reception ==
=== Ratings ===
The episode achieved a viewership of 6.95 million people during its initial airing in the United States. In the United Kingdom, the episode was viewed by 1.75 million viewers during its broadcast on Sky Atlantic, making it the highest-rated broadcast that week. The episode also received 0.07 million timeshift viewers.

=== Critical reception ===
The episode was acclaimed by critics and audiences. On the review aggregator website Rotten Tomatoes, 94% of 52 critics' reviews are positive, with an average rating of 10/10. The website's consensus reads: "While 'The Watchers of the Wall' lacks the emotional punch of previous episodes this season, it succeeds as an action-packed hour with cinema-worthy visuals."

James Hibberd of Entertainment Weekly wrote, "[the episode] was an intense rousing hour of heroism and heartbreak that set a new bar for what this show – and TV – can do." Another positive review came from Terri Schwartz of Zap2it.com, who wrote, "As the most expensive episode of the series, the Battle at Castle Black felt like an equivalent of The Lord of the Rings: The Two Towers Battle of Helm's Deep." David Malitz of The Washington Post was more negative about the episode, writing, "Aside from the major moment with Jon Snow and Ygritte it was hard to feel too emotionally invested in anything that happened. And as visually exciting as it was to watch everything unfold, the ending was surprisingly unfulfilling."

=== Accolades ===
Year	Award	Category	Nominee(s)	Result	Ref.
2014	Primetime Emmy Awards	Outstanding Directing for a Drama Series	Neil Marshall	Nominated	
2014	Primetime Creative Arts Emmy Awards	Outstanding Sound Editing for a Series	Tim Kimmel, Jed M. Dodge, Tim Hands, Paula Fairfield, David Klotz, Bradley C. Katona, Brett Voss, Jeffrey Wilhoit, and Dylan T. Wilhoit	Nominated	
2014	Primetime Creative Arts Emmy Awards	Outstanding Sound Mixing for a Comedy or Drama Series (One-Hour)	Ronan Hill, Richard Dyer, Onnalee Blank, and Mathew Waters	Nominated	
2015	Visual Effects Society	Outstanding Compositing in a Photoreal/Live Action Broadcast Program	Dan Breckwoldt, Martin Furman, Sophie Marfleet, and Eric Andrusyszyn	Won	
