= John Stahl =

Scottish actor (1953–2022)

- Born: John Macdonald Steele; 23 June 1953; Sauchie, Clackmannanshire, Scotland
- Died: 2 March 2022 (aged 68); Stornoway, Isle of Lewis, Scotland
- Occupation: Actor
- Years active: 1976–2022

John Macdonald Steele (23 June 1953 – 2 March 2022), better known as John Stahl, was a Scottish actor best known for playing Rickard Karstark in HBO's Game of Thrones and Tom 'Inverdarroch' Kerr in High Road.

== Life and career ==
Stahl was born on 23 June 1953 in Sauchie, Clackmannanshire.

John was educated at Alloa Academy and studied at the Royal Scottish Academy of Music and Drama. From 1975 to 1976, Stahl worked as an assistant director in the Darlington Drama Centre. His screen debut was in 1976. He found fame for his role as Tom 'Inverdarroch' Kerr in the television series High Road, in which he appeared as a series regular between 1982 and 2003. He also played the role of Rickard Karstark in HBO's Game of Thrones, appearing in the second and third seasons. His other roles include Inspector Reed in the 1995 television series Resort to Murder, and as Ewan in the 2011 Royal National Theatre production Frankenstein.

Stahl lived on the Isle of Lewis and was a supporter of Scottish independence. He died from brain cancer on 2 March 2022 at the age of 68.

== Filmography ==
=== Film ===
Year	Title	Role	Notes
1979	A Sense of Freedom	Det. Sergeant Williamson	
1989	Albert and the Lion	Forsyth	(TV Movie)
1995	Jolly: A Life	Moderator	(TV Movie)
1996	Loch Ness	First Fisherman	
2010	Vocation	Robert Herzfeld	(Short)
2017	Victoria & Abdul	Ghillie	
2018	Mary Queen of Scots	Fisherman	
2021	A Castle for Christmas	Solicitor	

=== Television ===
Year	Title	Role	Notes
1976	Garnock Way	Police Constible Schoular	1 episode
1977	The Mackinnons	Manager / Receptionist	2 episodes
1982–2003	High Road	Tom 'Inverdarroch' Kerr	114 episodes
1994	Taggart	Tom Fleming	1 episode
1994	Crime Story	Det. Insp. Brian Steer	1 episode
1995	The Tales of Para Handy	Robertson	1 episode
1995	Resort to Murder	Inspector Reed	5 episodes
1996	Doctor Finlay	Robbie Cuthbertson	1 episode
2001	Murder Rooms: Mysteries of the Real Sherlock Holmes	Supt. Milford	1 episode
2003	Doctors	Fred Griffiths	1 episode
2007	Rebus	Rev Andrew McLeod	1 episode
2008–2011	Holby City	Jasper Glenn / Mick Hales	2 episodes
2010	Being Human	Quinn	3 episodes
2012–2013	Game of Thrones	Rickard Karstark	5 episodes: "A Man Without Honor", "The Prince of Winterfell", "Valar Dohaeris", "Dark Wings, Dark Words" and "Kissed by Fire"
2016	Shetland	Eric the Boatman	1 episode
2019	Midsomer Murders	Damian Lint	1 episode
