= Valar Morghulis =

- Game of Thrones episode
- Episode no.: Season 2 Episode 10
- Directed by: Alan Taylor
- Written by: David Benioff; D. B. Weiss
- Cinematography by: Jonathan Freeman
- Editing by: Frances Parker
- Original air date: June 3, 2012
- Running time: 63 minutes

Guest appearances
- Donald Sumpter as Maester Luwin; Julian Glover as Grand Maester Pycelle; Ian Hanmore as Pyat Pree; Natalia Tena as Osha; Tom Wlaschiha as Jaqen H'ghar; Simon Armstrong as Qhorin Halfhand; Gwendoline Christie as Brienne of Tarth; Rose Leslie as Ygritte; Nonso Anozie as Xaro Xhoan Daxos; Joe Dempsie as Gendry; Oona Chaplin as Talisa Mygaer; Esme Bianco as Ros; Finn Jones as Loras Tyrell; Mark Stanley as Grenn; Ben Crompton as Eddison Tollett; Ben Hawkey as Hot Pie; Ralph Ineson as Dagmer Cleftjaw; Roxanne McKee as Doreah; Steven Cole as Kovarro; Kristian Nairn as Hodor; Art Parkinson as Rickon Stark; Edward Dogliani as Rattleshirt; Forbes KB as Black Lorren; Daniel Portman as Podrick Payne; Ross Mullan as a White Walker; Wren Ros Elliot-Sloan as Rhaego; Jason Momoa as Khal Drogo

Episode chronology
← Previous "Blackwater"	Next → "Valar Dohaeris"
- Game of Thrones season 2

"Valar Morghulis" is the tenth and final episode of the second season of HBO's medieval fantasy television series Game of Thrones, and the 20th overall. The episode was written by series co-creators David Benioff and D. B. Weiss and directed by Alan Taylor. It first aired on June 3, 2012.

The episode concludes many storylines featured throughout the second season, such as Tyrion Lannister's position as Hand of the King, Stannis Baratheon's impending invasion, and Sansa Stark's betrothal to Joffrey Baratheon. In the episode, citizens of King's Landing deal with the aftermath of Stannis's failed attack on the city, with Tywin Lannister being named Hand of the King in Tyrion's stead; Sansa's engagement to Joffrey is annulled, and Margaery Tyrell is betrothed in her place; and Stannis broods in defeat at Dragonstone. Other plotlines include Brienne of Tarth escorting Jaime Lannister south, Jon Snow earning the trust of the Free Folk, and Daenerys Targaryen reuniting with her dragons in the House of the Undying. The episode's title is a code phrase spoken by Jaqen H'ghar to Arya Stark, but its meaning, "all men must die," is not explained until the next season.

"Valar Morghulis" received positive reviews from critics and viewers, with many praising the writing, development, and the final scene. It achieved a viewership of 4.20 million during its initial airing in the United States, setting a new record for the series. At the 64th Primetime Creative Arts Emmy Awards, the episode won the award for Outstanding Special Visual Effects and was nominated for Outstanding Prosthetic Makeup.

The episode marks the final appearance of Jason Momoa (Khal Drogo).

== Plot ==
=== In King's Landing ===
Tywin is named Hand of the King and Baelish is awarded Harrenhal. Ser Loras asks Joffrey to wed Lady Margaery, with Cersei's agreement and Grand Maester Pycelle's confirmation that the sacred vow taken with Sansa has been nullified due to her family's treason. Baelish offers to smuggle Sansa home but she declines.

Scarred and without allies except Podrick, Tyrion suspects his sister Cersei was behind the attempt on his life. Bronn is dismissed from his position as captain of the City Watch. Shae tries to convince Tyrion to leave for Pentos, but he refuses.

=== At Dragonstone ===
Stannis tries to strangle Melisandre for his defeat but relents after truly comprehending her involvement in Renly's death. His faith in her is restored when he sees visions in the flames.

=== In the Westerlands ===
Escorting Jaime to King's Landing, Brienne finds three women lynched by Stark soldiers for sleeping with Lannister soldiers. She kills the Stark soldiers after one recognizes Jaime before burying the women. Brienne reminds Jaime that she serves Catelyn, not House Stark.

Robb confides in Catelyn that he loves Talisa and will not proceed with the arranged marriage to House Frey. Despite Catelyn's warning, Robb marries Talisa.

=== At Winterfell ===
Under siege, Theon rejects Luwin's advice to leave for the Night's Watch, believing Jon will kill him. Theon tries to rally his men, but is knocked out by Dagmer and brought to the Bolton forces. Luwin is stabbed by Dagmer.

Bran and his party find Winterfell burned and Luwin dying in the Godswood, advising them to head for the Wall before having Osha mercifully kill him.

=== In the Riverlands ===
Fleeing Harrenhal, Arya, Gendry and Hot Pie are surprised by Jaqen, who offers to train Arya in what he knows, but she declines, saying she must find her family. He gives her a special coin and the phrase "Valar morghulis" to use to find him, and reveals his face-changing ability before departing.

=== In Qarth ===
Pyat Pree's magic strands Jorah and Kovarro outside the House of the Undying while trapping Daenerys within. After encountering strange visions of a ruined King's Landing, entering beyond the Wall and lastly seeing Drogo with their deceased baby boy, she finally finds her dragons chained as Pyat Pree appears and binds her. Daenerys orders her dragons to breathe fire, killing Pyat Pree and freeing her and her dragons as their binding chains dissolved.

Daenerys finds Xaro in bed with Doreah and seals them in Xaro's empty vault (revealing that his claim to be wealthy was a lie all along). She and her companions then loot Xaro's house to buy a ship to sail to Astapor.

=== Beyond the Wall ===
Qhorin goads Jon into killing him, convincing the wildlings Jon has defected. Jon is introduced to the massive wildling force and promised a meeting with Mance Rayder.

Edd, Grenn and Sam hear three horn blasts (meaning White Walkers). Edd and Grenn run and leave Sam. Sam is surrounded by an army of wights and a White Walker as they march toward the Night's Watch's encampment.

== Production ==
=== Writing ===
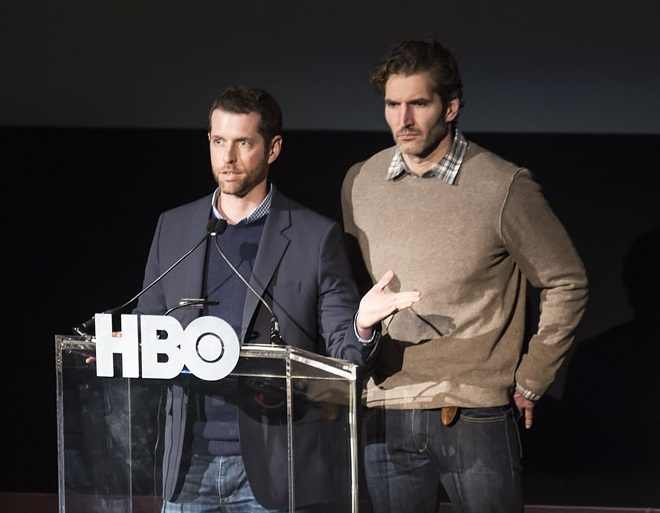
The episode was written by series co-creators David Benioff and D. B. Weiss.

The episode was written by producers David Benioff and D. B. Weiss (their sixth and final script of the season) and directed by Alan Taylor. It was Taylor's final episode on the show until he returned for the season seven episode "Beyond the Wall". The episode covers chapters Tyrion XV, Sansa VIII, Theon VI, Arya IX, Bran VII, Daenerys IV, and Jon VIII from A Clash of Kings and the prologue and chapters Jaime I, Tyrion I, and Jon I of A Storm of Swords. As a season finale, "Valar Morghulis" is a slightly extended episode.

=== Filming ===
The Minčeta Tower in Dubrovnik was used as the location of the House of the Undying.

== Reception ==
=== Ratings ===
In its original broadcast on June 3, 2012, the episode received 4.20 million viewers, to become the most-watched episode of the series until the third season aired. In the United Kingdom, the episode was viewed by 0.973 million viewers, making it the highest-rated broadcast that week.

=== Critical reception ===
"Valar Morghulis" received highly positive reviews.

On the review aggregator website Rotten Tomatoes, 92% of 26 critics' reviews are positive, with an average rating of 8.6/10. The website's consensus reads: "Smart writing, a few surprising plot developments, and an ominous final scene make 'Valar Morghulis' a satisfying conclusion to a stellar season." Matt Fowler of IGN rated the episode 9 out of 10. David Sims of The A.V. Club gave the episode an "A" grade.

=== Awards and nominations ===
Year	Award	Category	Nominee(s)	Result
2012	Primetime Creative Arts Emmy Awards	Outstanding Prosthetic Makeup for a Series, Miniseries, Movie, or Special	Paul Engelen, Conor O'Sullivan, and Rob Trenton	Nominated
2012	Primetime Creative Arts Emmy Awards	Outstanding Special Visual Effects	Rainer Gombos, Juri Stanossek, Sven Martin, Steve Kullback, Jan Fiedler, Chris Stenner, Tobias Mannewitz, Thilo Ewers, and Adam Chazen	Won
2013	Golden Reel Awards	Best Sound Editing – Long Form Dialogue and ADR in Television		Won
2013	Golden Reel Awards	Best Sound Editing – Long Form Sound Effects and Foley in Television		Won
2013	Visual Effects Society	Outstanding Visual Effects in a Broadcast Program	Rainer Gombos, Steve Kullback, Sven Martin, and Juri Stanossek	Won
