= Blackwater (Game of Thrones) =

- Game of Thrones episode
- Wildfire explosion during the Battle of Blackwater Bay. The visual effects in the episode received critical acclaim.
- Episode no.: Season 2 Episode 9
- Directed by: Neil Marshall
- Written by: George R. R. Martin
- Cinematography by: Sam McCurdy
- Editing by: Oral Norrie Ottey
- Original air date: May 27, 2012
- Running time: 55 minutes

Guest appearances
- Roy Dotrice as Pyromancer Hallyne; Julian Glover as Grand Maester Pycelle; Eugene Simon as Lancel Lannister; Kerr Logan as Matthos Seaworth; Finn Jones as Loras Tyrell; Sahara Knite as Armeca; Tony Way as Dontos Hollard; Wilko Johnson as Ilyn Payne; Stephen Swift as Lannister Guard; Callum Wharry as Tommen Baratheon; Daniel Portman as Podrick Payne; Gordan Mahon as Imry Florent; James Doran as Mandon Moore

Episode chronology
← Previous "The Prince of Winterfell"	Next → "Valar Morghulis"
- Game of Thrones season 2

"Blackwater" is the ninth and penultimate episode of the second season of HBO's medieval fantasy television series Game of Thrones, and the 19th overall. The episode was directed by Neil Marshall, his directorial debut for the series, and written by George R. R. Martin, the author of the A Song of Ice and Fire novels from which the series is adapted. It first aired on May 27, 2012.

The episode centers around the Battle of Blackwater Bay, in which the Lannister army, commanded by acting Hand of the King Tyrion Lannister, defends the city of King's Landing against a naval invasion by the Baratheon army, commanded by Stannis Baratheon, who seeks to take the Iron Throne for himself. Unlike all previous episodes, "Blackwater" does not feature the storylines of characters outside of King's Landing, making it the first episode of the series to take place entirely in one location. The episode achieved a viewership of 3.38 million during its initial airing in the United States.

"Blackwater" received acclaim from critics and viewers, with many hailing it as one of the series' best episodes, praising the titular battle and its scale and emotional depth, as well as the acting and visual effects. At the 64th Primetime Emmy Awards, the episode won the awards for Outstanding Sound Editing for a Drama Series (One-Hour) and Outstanding Sound Mixing for a Drama Series (One Hour). It was Peter Dinklage's choice to support his nomination for Outstanding Supporting Actor in a Drama Series. The episode was also the recipient of the Hugo Award for Best Dramatic Presentation, Short Form.

== Plot ==
Davos leads Stannis's fleet into Blackwater Bay. Grand Maester Pycelle gives Cersei a poison to use should Stannis take the city. Outside the Red Keep, Bronn's carousing is soured by the Hound; their tension is interrupted by bells, indicating Stannis's fleet has been spotted. Varys brings Tyrion a map of the tunnels beneath King's Landing. King Joffrey leads his forces from the Red Keep and orders Sansa to kiss his sword, vowing to use it to kill Stannis. The noble ladies and children shelter at Maegor's Holdfast under Ser Ilyn Payne's watch. Cersei drunkenly mocks Sansa's innocence, warning she will be raped if the city falls.

Stannis's fleet is confronted by a single unmanned ship, which Davos realizes too late is a trap: the ship, rigged with explosive "wildfire", kills scores of Stannis's men, seemingly including Davos and his son Matthos. Stannis orders his surviving army to attack the vulnerable Mud Gate. The defenders are routed; Lancel, injured, retreats to the Holdfast. Having never experienced a real battle, Joffrey is too scared to lead his men in a counterattack, disheartening the soldiers. Set on edge by his childhood fear of fire and disgusted by Joffrey's cowardice, the Hound deserts his post and renounces his allegiance to the Lannisters. Stannis himself storms the battlements as his men employ a battering ram. Cersei nearly learns Shae's true origins, while Sansa realizes Ser Ilyn's orders: to kill her and Cersei if the city falls.

Cersei orders Lancel to bring Joffrey to safety; frightened, Joffrey orders Ser Mandon Moore to take command. Tyrion rouses the defenders and leads them through a tunnel from Varys's map, flanking the Baratheon army from behind. Lancel demands the king return to battle, causing Cersei to assault him and depart with Prince Tommen. Sansa rallies the panicked ladies but is convinced by Shae to flee to her quarters. The Hound, hiding in Sansa's quarters, offers to take her north, but she appears to refuse.

Tyrion's men defeat the surprised Baratheon forces before facing a larger group of Stannis's men. Tyrion is slashed across the face by Ser Mandon, who is killed by Tyrion's squire, Podrick Payne. On the Iron Throne, Cersei tells Tommen a story about "the mother lion and her little cub", referencing House Lannister and Cersei's relationship with her children. As Tyrion falls unconscious, he witnesses a surprise cavalry assault by the Tyrells on Stannis's army, led by Tyrion's father Tywin. Stannis unsuccessfully orders his men to stand their ground as he is dragged to safety. Cersei, about to give Tommen the poison, is startled by Tywin, who declares they have won.

== Production ==
The DVD and Blu-ray box sets of Game of Thrones's second season contain a 30-minute feature covering the production of the episode.

=== Conception and development ===
"Blackwater" is the first episode of the series to take place in one location and does not feature plotlines from characters outside of King's Landing. Due to this limited scope, the episode is sometimes considered by critics to be a bottle episode. The episode depicts the series's first large-scale war sequence: the confrontation between the Lannisters and the Baratheons towards which most of the season builds. Showrunners were concerned that adapting the full scale of the battle described in George R. R. Martin's A Clash of Kings would require a larger budget than the $6 million HBO approved for the episode. As a cheaper alternative, early proposals suggested the battle take place mostly offscreen, with viewers experiencing it through the eyes of Cersei Lannister and Sansa Stark, receiving occasional updates from the battlefield as they sheltered in Maegor's Holdfast. However, executive producers David Benioff and D. B. Weiss were not satisfied with this idea, believing that it was important the battle be shown. Benioff and Weiss eventually convinced HBO to approve a $2 million increase in the episode's budget as well as an extra week of filming in order to stage the battle onscreen. The final product cost about $8 million to produce.

With their still-limited resources, producers decided not to stage the battle precisely as described in the novel but rather to scale it down. Producers decided to set the battle at night to make it easier to hide any production errors and to save money on special effects. Benioff and Weiss resisted pressure to stage the battle exclusively on land, which would avoid the difficulties of filming on water, because they considered the naval confrontation to be essential to the season's principal storyline. Benioff and Weiss opted to craft the battle scenes around characters familiar to the audience to keep the audience engaged while also avoiding expensive wide shots involving many extras. Benioff named Saving Private Ryan (1998), Lawrence of Arabia (1962), Spartacus (1960), El Cid (1961), and Zulu (1964) as influences on the episode's choreography.

=== Writing ===
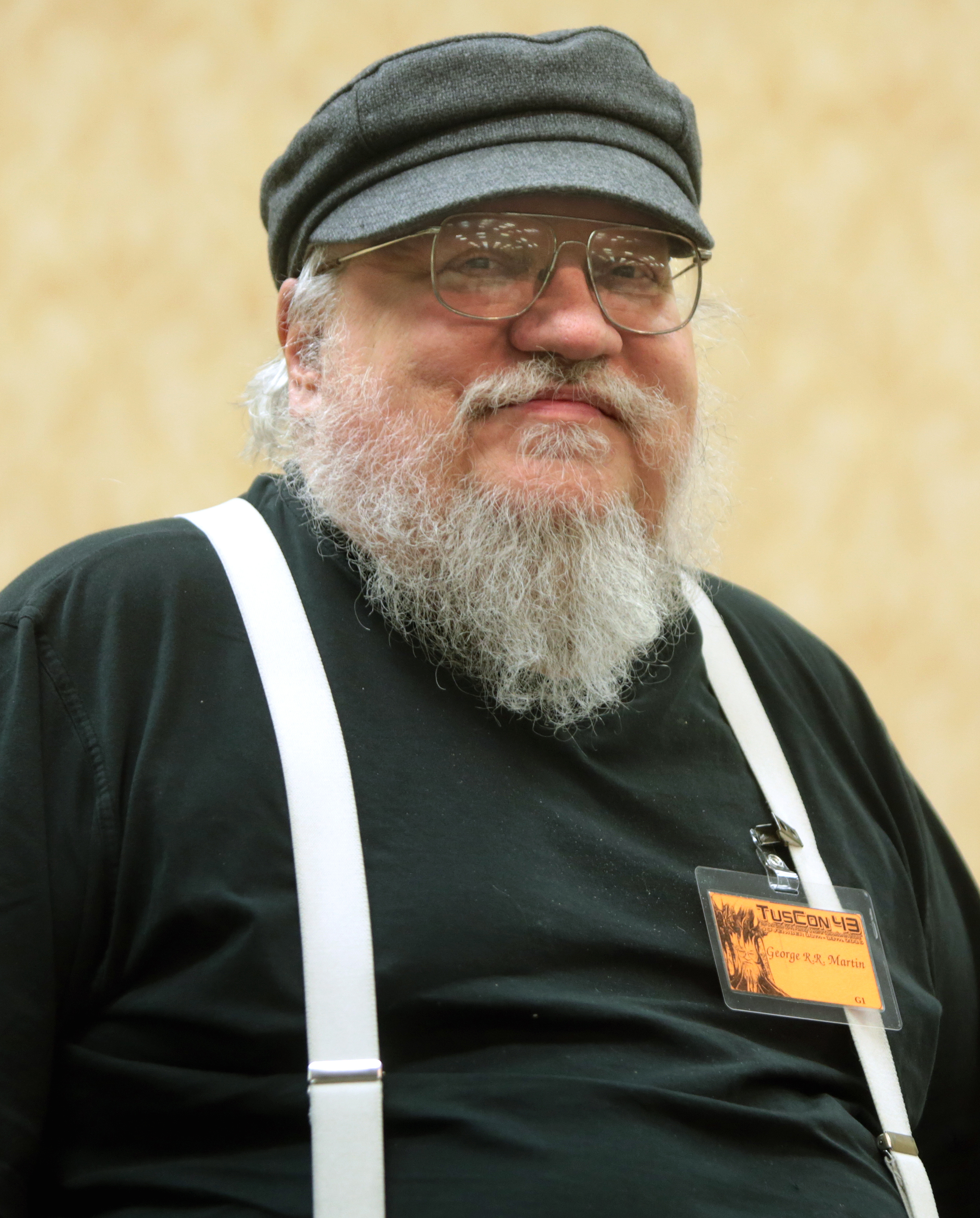
"Blackwater" was scripted by the author of the original saga: George R. R. Martin

The episode was written by George R. R. Martin, the author of the A Song of Ice and Fire novels on which the series is based. For the episode, Martin adapted material from chapters 58 to 63 (Sansa V, Davos III, Tyrion XIII, Sansa VI, Tyrion XIV, and Sansa VII) of his novel A Clash of Kings. Martin said that Benioff and Weiss gave him "the hardest episode of the season" to write, and that he was forced to weigh budget restrictions against the huge scope of the battle he described in the book.

=== Filming ===
About a week before filming was set to begin, the episode's planned director had to leave the production because of a personal emergency, and a replacement had to be found quickly. Executive producer Bernadette Caulfield suggested they hire Neil Marshall for his experience as an action director. Marshall was aware of Game of Thrones and had unsuccessfully sought a directing role during the first season. Benioff and Weiss eventually settled on Marshall because of his work on Centurion (2010) and Dog Soldiers (2002), where he created intensive action sequences on a limited budget. Marshall was asked to direct the episode just two days before he was scheduled to appear on set. Marshall avoided watching the Battle of Helm's Deep in The Lord of the Rings: The Two Towers (2002) because it was, according to him, "an obvious comparison"; instead, he studied films such as The Vikings (1958) and Kingdom of Heaven (2005).

The indoor scenes were filmed in Croatia. For the battle, Benioff described the sequence's filming as "pretty much a month straight of night shoots" that were "tough on the crew". Marshall said that the battle's filming took place at a quarry near Belfast, Northern Ireland over the course of "very cold, rainy, muddy nights". Belfast's cold and wet climate was so harsh that weather machines were not needed to simulate the wind and rain, and Benioff insisted that the actors' exhaustion was not faked. For Stannis's fleet, the crew built a full-size battleship in the parking lot of the quarry, modeled after battleships used in the 14th century. It was the only physical ship the crew had for filming.

The episode contained more visual effects shots than any other episode up to that point. For the wildfire explosion, the special-effects department developed a catapult that fired bags of burning napalm, but they could not make the fire burn green, and Marshall was unsatisfied with the way it looked. The crew instead decided to color correct regular fire green in post-production. The final product was created by visual effects studio Pixomondo.

=== Music ===
The song sung by the Lannister soldiers before the battle and played over the end credits, "The Rains of Castamere", was adapted from the A Song of Ice and Fire novels by series composer Ramin Djawadi. The end credits version was performed by the American indie rock band The National and sung by their vocalist Matt Berninger. The song also appeared twice in the season two premiere "The North Remembers", in which Tyrion can be heard whistling the melody during a small council meeting, and is later played in the background as Cersei confronts Petyr Baelish.

According to the novels, the song is about Tywin Lannister's victory over vassals led by House Reyne of Castamere, who had rebelled against House Lannister, about 40 years before the events of the novels. The stanza of the song that was adapted for the series tells of the vassals' defiance-–"And who are you, the proud lord said / That I must bow so low?"–-and the subsequent obliteration of their houses: "But now the rains weep o'er his hall / With no one there to hear."

== Reception ==
=== Ratings ===
On the night of its premiere, the episode achieved a viewership of 3.38 million for its initial airing at 9:00 pm and an additional 0.83 million viewers for the rerun at 11:00 pm. Viewer shares among the 18–49 demographic were 1.6 and 0.4 respectively. This represented a 13 percent decrease in viewership from the previous episode, "The Prince of Winterfell", which set a new series record for viewership figures. James Hibberd of Entertainment Weekly attributed this to the premiere's coincidence with Memorial Day weekend, which often reduces television viewership by about 20 percent. In the United Kingdom, the episode was seen by 1.035 million viewers, making it the highest-rated broadcast that week.

=== Critical reception ===
"Blackwater" received critical acclaim and is generally cited as one of the best episodes of the series. On the review aggregator website Rotten Tomatoes, 100% of 26 critics' reviews are positive, with an average rating of 9.5/10. The website's consensus reads: "GoT delivers a thrilling tour de force in 'Blackwater', an epic hour of blockbuster television full of spectacular battle sequences and equally powerful drama." Many reviewers used superlatives: for Time's reviewer, the episode was "possibly the best hour of TV" of the year, for Rolling Stone it was "the show's best episode yet", and Entertainment Weekly described it as "arguably the best battle sequence ever produced for television", surpassing those in HBO's World War II series Band of Brothers and The Pacific.

IGN's Matt Fowler gave the episode a perfect 10 out of 10, calling it a masterpiece. Alan Sepinwall, who reviewed the episode for HitFix, called it "an epic battle, and an intimate hour" and continued "but what ultimately made Blackwater so impressive wasn't the scope, but the focus". Ed Cumming's review for The Daily Telegraph praised the episode as "an emerald inferno, as lethal as it was beautiful to watch".

Commentators praised the battle's emotional impact and epic scale. Although much reduced compared to its description in A Clash of Kings, it still went beyond anything attempted by any other regular series, according to Emily St. James of The A.V. Club. Lena Headey's performance as the increasingly cynical, drunk, and desperate Queen Regent Cersei was particularly noted. Sean Collins of Rolling Stone commented that the episode "gave actress Lena Headey her finest hour on the show so far". Writing for The Guardian, Sarah Hughes described the performances of both Headey and costar Peter Dinklage as "wonderful", going on to say of Headey's Cersei that she "displayed a terrifying strength" and that her final scene with Tommen was "gut-wrenching". The episode also received praise for its unsentimental depiction of warfare as a harrowing and costly enterprise, with Emily St. James interpreting it as a critique of "the sorts of political systems that perpetuate it".

The episode's director, Neil Marshall, called the fan and critical reaction to the episode "overwhelming", adding that he's "never seen anything like it for a TV episode".

=== Awards and nominations ===
Year	Award	Category	Nominee(s)	Result	Ref.
2012	Primetime Emmy Awards	Outstanding Supporting Actor in a Drama Series	Peter Dinklage as Tyrion Lannister	Nominated	
2012	Primetime Creative Arts Emmy Awards	Outstanding Sound Editing for a Series	Peter Brown, Kira Roessler, Tim Hands, Paul Aulicino, Stephen P. Robinson, Vanessa Lapato, Brett Voss, James Moriana, Jeffrey Wilhoit, and David Klotz	Won	
2012	Primetime Creative Arts Emmy Awards	Outstanding Sound Mixing for a Drama Series (One Hour)	Matthew Waters, Onnalee Blank, Ronan Hill, and Mervyn Moore	Won	
2012	British Society of Cinematographers	Best Cinematography in a Television Drama	Sam McCurdy	Nominated	
2012	IGN Awards	Best TV Episode		Won	
2012	IGN People's Choice Award	Best TV Episode		Won	
2013	Cinema Audio Society Awards	Outstanding Achievement in Sound Mixing - Television Series – One Hour	Ronan Hill, Onnalee Blank, Mathew Waters, and Brett Voss	Nominated	
2013	Hugo Awards	Best Dramatic Presentation, Short Form	Neil Marshall (director) and George R. R. Martin (writer)	Won	
