= Sahara Knite =

British pornographic film actress

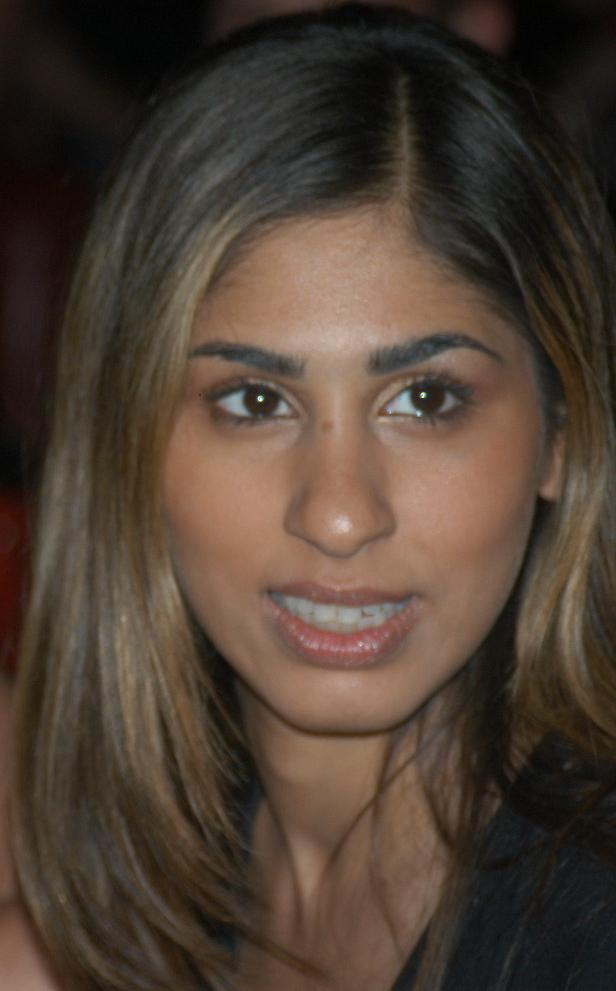
Knite in 2005

Sahara Knite is a British pornographic film actress and sex worker activist who came to mainstream attention when she had a recurring role playing Armeca, a prostitute who featured in the first two seasons of the fantasy TV series Game of Thrones in 2011 and 2012.

In 2005, she was featured in "Diary of a Porn Virgin", an episode of the Channel 4 idocumentary series The Dark Side of Porn, which described her background and entrance into the porn industry at a time when very few performers of Indian origin were working in the British pornography industry.

She has also worked as a dominatrix and session wrestler specialising in Brazilian Jiu Jitsu. She also appeared in the making-of documentary for Game of Thrones, and had a minor role in the 2020 science fiction TV mini-series Brave New World.

She became chairperson of the United Kingdom Adult Professionals industry organization in 2019.

In 2023, she was given an award for Outstanding Contribution to the UK Adult Industry in the SNAP Awards.
