= Sandor Clegane =

Character in A Song of Ice and Fire

- A Song of Ice and Fire character Game of Thrones character
- Rory McCann as Sandor Clegane
- First appearance: Literature: A Game of Thrones (1996); Television: "Winter Is Coming" (2011)
- Last appearance: Literature: A Feast for Crows (2005); Television: "The Bells" (2019)
- Created by: George R. R. Martin
- Adapted by: D.B. Weiss & David Benioff (Game of Thrones)
- Portrayed by: Rory McCann

In-universe information
- Aliases: The Hound; Dog (derisively)
- Gender: Male
- Occupation: Royal bodyguard (formerly); Kingsguard (formerly)
- Family: House Clegane
- Relatives: Gregor Clegane (brother)

Sandor Clegane, nicknamed the Hound, is a fictional character in the A Song of Ice and Fire series of fantasy novels by American author George R. R. Martin, and its television adaptation Game of Thrones.

Introduced in 1996's A Game of Thrones, Sandor is the estranged younger brother of Ser Gregor Clegane from the fictional Seven Kingdoms of Westeros. Sandor serves as King Joffrey Baratheon's personal bodyguard. He subsequently appeared in Martin's A Clash of Kings (1998), A Storm of Swords (2000), and A Feast for Crows (2005). Like his brother, Sandor is regarded as one of the fiercest and strongest fighters in the Seven Kingdoms. His face is marked by gruesome facial burns he received as a child when his brother shoved his face into a brazier; ever since, he has retained a crippling fear of fire, as well as a fierce hatred for his brother. While initially appearing brutal and fatalistic, he later proves to be far more honorable, sympathetic, and compassionate, particularly through his relationships with Sansa and Arya Stark.

Sandor is portrayed by Scottish actor Rory McCann in the HBO television adaptation. McCann also narrates the animated "History and Lore" for House Clegane, available in the bonus material on the Blu-Ray releases.

== Character description ==
Sandor Clegane, also known as "the Hound", is the younger brother of Gregor Clegane and was a retainer to House Lannister. He was regarded as one of Westeros's most dangerous and skilled fighters. His size—in the novels, he is 6 feet 8 inches (2.03 m) tall and weighs over 300 pounds (140 kg)—and strength make him an imposing figure, though even he is not as large as his brother, Gregor. His visage is distinguished by gruesome burn scars that he received as a child when his brother forced his head into a brazier. Consequently, Clegane fears fire and hates his brother. He is cynical and scornful of knights' vows and codes of honor, as Gregor is a brutal knight utterly devoid of any morality or humanity—a sadist who delights and revels in rape, bloodshed, and violence. Clegane was described as a tormented man, driven by anger and hate, suffering from childhood trauma, and obsessed with killing his brother.

== Storylines ==
=== Novels ===
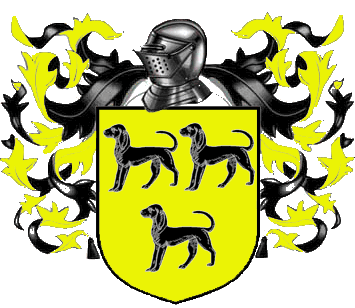
Coat of arms of House Clegane

Sandor Clegane is not a point of view character in the novels, so his actions are witnessed mainly through the eyes of Sansa and Arya Stark, with some narrations from other characters such as Ned Stark and Tyrion Lannister.

==== A Game of Thrones and A Clash of Kings ====
In A Game of Thrones, he acts as a bodyguard and servant to then-Crown Prince Joffrey Baratheon, who calls him "Dog" but is somewhat attached to him: Joffrey lacks a father figure in his supposed father, King Robert Baratheon. While escorting Sansa home one evening, he reveals to her how his face was scarred and expresses much resentment of his brutish older brother and towards the concept of knighthood, in general. Clegane hunts down Arya Stark's friend Mycah, and leads the Lannister attack on Ned Stark's men in the Tower of the Hand during the purge of the Starks.

Sandor is named to Joffrey's Kingsguard towards the end of A Game of Thrones, but always refuses to become a knight. Clegane is often assigned to guard Sansa, becoming quite protective of her and calling her "little bird." He tries to protect her from Joffrey's abuse in A Clash of Kings, and advises her to do whatever Joffrey tells her as the best method of survival. He saves Sansa's life when Joffrey's entourage is set upon by his own impoverished citizens in the streets of King's Landing. Sandor becomes disillusioned during the Battle of the Blackwater and abandons his duty as Joffrey's guard due to the widespread use of wildfire, an incendiary substance inspired by Greek fire. He offers to help Sansa flee King's Landing and is agitated when she refuses. He threatens her but then calms down after she sings him a song about mercy before fleeing the capital on his own.

==== A Storm of Swords ====
In A Storm of Swords, the lordless Sandor gets drunk and is captured by the Brotherhood Without Banners, which sentences him to trial by combat on a charge of murder levied by Arya. Sandor prevails against the Brotherhood leader, Beric Dondarrion, and is set free. He later kidnaps Arya and hopes to ransom her to her brother Robb Stark at Riverrun to earn a place in Robb's service. He takes her to the Twins, where Robb is attending the wedding of his uncle. However, just as they arrive, the events of the Red Wedding begin, and House Frey begins slaughtering the Starks. Sandor knocks Arya unconscious to prevent her from running into the castle and fights his way out, killing three Frey knights. They later encounter three of Gregor's men—Polliver, the Tickler, and a pimply squire from House Sarsfield—at the Crossroad Inn. Sandor is provoked while drunk and kills Polliver in the ensuing altercation, but is seriously injured. He becomes critically ill when his wounds begin to fester, and Arya abandons him under a tree to await his apparent death.

==== A Feast for Crows ====
He is mentioned a few times in A Feast for Crows (2005), because stories are spreading that somebody using the Hound's helmet is committing atrocities. But the Elder Brother mentions to Brienne of Tarth that he found Sandor moribund and is now "at rest", so his helmet was doubtless stolen from his graveyard. However, the appearance of a mute gravedigger who physically matches Sandor, and the Elder Brother's refusal to confirm whether Sandor is dead, suggest that he may still be alive. As for the Hound's helmet, it is later revealed to Brienne and Podrick that it was Rorge and his criminal band who took it. When the two are captured by the Brotherhood Without Banners and Rorge's band is killed, Lem decides to keep the helmet for himself despite Thoros's opposition.

=== TV adaptation ===
Scottish actor Rory McCann has received acclaim for his portrayal of Sandor Clegane in the television adaptation of the books.

==== Season 1 ====
Clegane is first introduced in the pilot episode when he accompanies the royal court on Robert Baratheon's visit to Winterfell. On the return trip to King's Landing, Joffrey falsely accuses a butcher's boy, Mycah, of having attacked him with a sword. So, Clegane must hunt the fugitive boy down, allegedly "accidentally" killing Mycah, thereby attracting the hatred of Mycah's friend, Arya Stark. Weeks later, during the Tourney of the Hand, Sandor's brutally sadistic brother, Gregor, tries to kill Ser Loras Tyrell for unhorsing him, but Sandor intervenes, saving Loras's life. When Ned Stark reveals that Joffrey is a bastard born of incest, Clegane assists the Lannister soldiers in the subsequent purge of the Stark household and Sansa Stark's capture. However, he later comforts Sansa when Joffrey torments her and advises her on how to avoid future pain. With Joffrey's ascension to the throne, Clegane is named to the Kingsguard to replace the ousted Ser Barristan Selmy.

==== Season 2 ====
Sandor Clegane continues to defend Sansa, covering her after Joffrey has her humiliated and stripped in front of the assembled royal court. His humanity and underlying compassion are briefly revealed when he rescues Sansa from a fatal gang-rape during a King's Landing street riot. But when Sansa thanks him and praises his bravery, he curtly brushes aside her gratitude, cynically professing, "Killing is the sweetest thing there is. Your father was a killer, your brothers are killers. Your betrothed, the king, is a killer."

He is one of the more effective leaders at the Battle of the Blackwater against Stannis Baratheon's shore forces, but he is visibly shaken by fire: "If any of those flaming fucking arrows come near me, I'll strangle you with your own guts," and he is horrified by the wildfire that incinerates much of Stannis's fleet. He ultimately deserts the battle and city after losing half of his men and witnessing some being burned alive, declaring, "Fuck the King's Guard. Fuck the city. Fuck the king." Before he leaves King's Landing, in a drunken stupor, he offers to take Sansa north to Winterfell, but she declines.

==== Season 3 ====
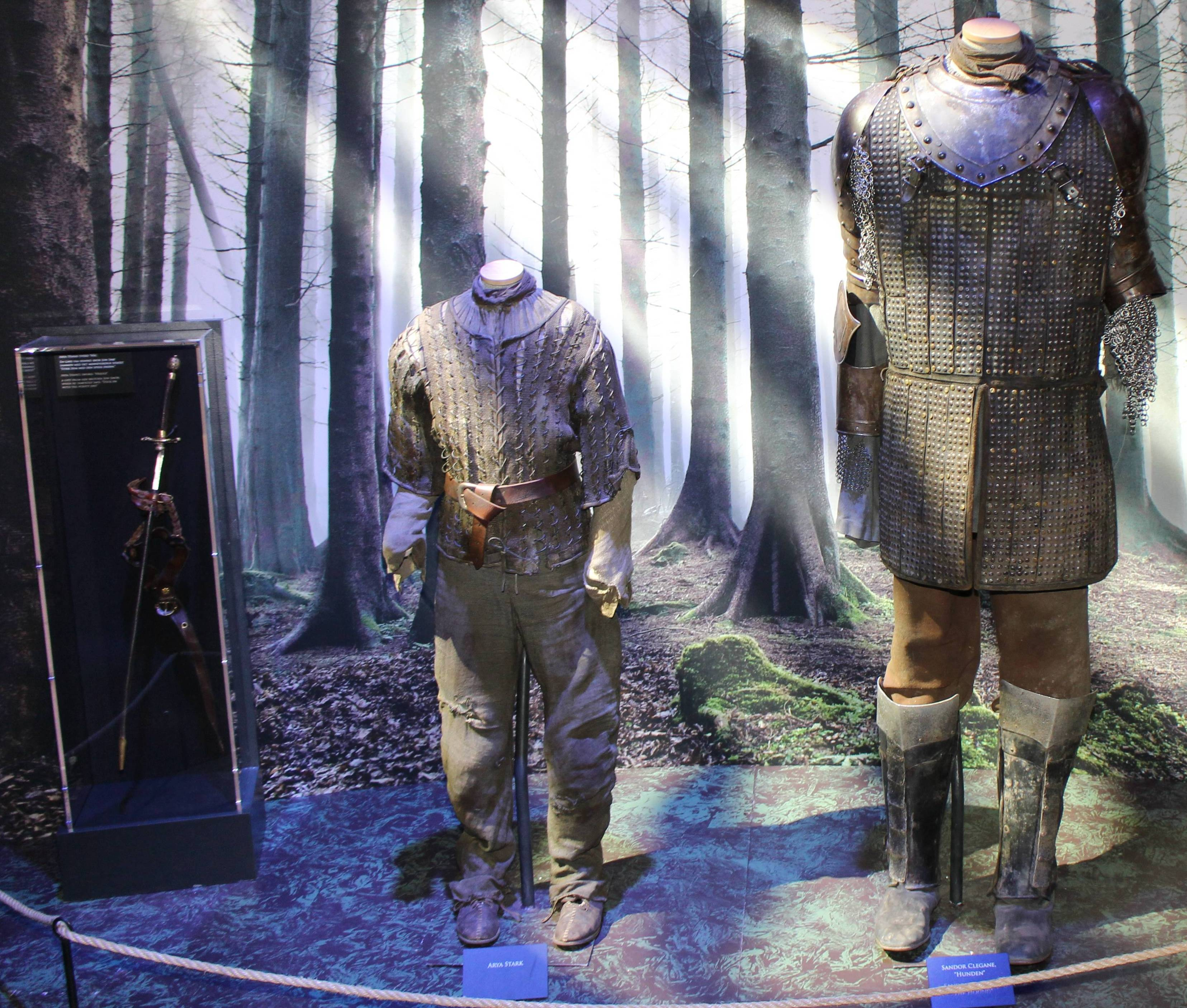
The costumes worn by Arya and her companion Sandor Clegane in the TV series Game of Thrones.

In the Riverlands, Clegane is captured by the Brotherhood Without Banners, a group of knights and soldiers sent by Eddard Stark (in season 1) to stop Gregor and restore order to the Riverlands. At a rustic inn, while being transported, he notices and reveals Arya Stark's true identity to them. At the Brotherhood's cave hideout, he is accused and tried via combat against their leader, Lord Beric Dondarrion. However, Clegane asserts that any killings, even running down Mycah, the butcher's son, were committed in protection of Prince Joffrey: "I was [his] sworn shield. My place is not to question princes." Despite Beric's flaming sword, Sandor secures his freedom, dealing a fatal blow to Lord Beric, who is then immediately resurrected by the priest of R'hllor Thoros of Myr. Accusing them of thievery, as they will not now return his gold, days later, Clegane, still in the area, kidnaps a fleeing Arya, intending to ransom her to Robb Stark, at the wedding of Edmure Tully and Roslin Frey. However, they arrive at the Twins just as the Freys unfold their "Red Wedding" plot, and Clegane and Arya barely escape the ensuing bloody massacre.

==== Season 4 ====
With the rest of House Stark believed dead and the Riverlands now under the rule of House Frey, Clegane decides to ransom Arya to her aunt Lysa Arryn in the Vale. During their journey, Arya reveals to Clegane that she has not forgiven him for killing Mycah and has vowed to kill him. The duo arrives in the Vale to find that Lysa has ostensibly committed suicide. Returning from the Bloody Gate, they encounter the sworn sword to Arya's mother, Catelyn, Brienne of Tarth, who had promised to take the Stark children to safety. When Arya refuses to go with Brienne, Brienne and Clegane engage in single combat that culminates in Brienne knocking Clegane off a cliff, gravely wounding him. Although Clegane begs Arya to kill him, she coldly leaves him to die.

==== Season 6 ====
It is revealed that Clegane survived; Ray, a warrior-turned-septon, discovered him. Ray slowly begins to turn the Hound towards the embrace of goodness. Clegane assists Ray and his followers in building a sept, but one day, after a brief journey into nearby woods to chop wood, Clegane returns to the community to find everyone slaughtered by rogue members of the Brotherhood Without Banners. Clegane takes up an ax to hunt down those responsible and kills four of them before discovering the remaining three about to be hanged by Lord Beric Dondarrion and Thoros of Myr, who inform him that the group was acting independently of the Brotherhood. Lord Beric allows Clegane to help hang two of the outlaws, followed by an offer to join the Brotherhood in their journey north to help Jon Snow and the Night's Watch fight the White Walkers.

==== Season 7 ====
During their journey north, the Brotherhood stops at a farm owned by a farmer Clegane had previously robbed. Inside, they find the bodies of the farmer and his daughter. Remorseful and saddened by their fates, Clegane digs them a grave with Thoros's help. Thoros has Clegane look into the flames of the Brotherhood's campfire, and in them the skeptical Clegane sees the White Walkers and their forces marching towards the Wall.

The Brotherhood attempts to cross the Wall via Eastwatch-by-the-Sea, but is intercepted by wildling scouts manning the castle and is locked in the ice cells. Soon afterward, Jon Snow, Davos Seaworth, Jorah Mormont, and Gendry arrive at Eastwatch, intending to capture a wight to present to Cersei (now Queen of the Seven Kingdoms) as evidence that the White Walkers exist. Clegane, Beric, and Thoros are released to accompany Jon, Jorah, Gendry, and the wildling Tormund Giantsbane beyond the Wall. The group soon captures a wight but is surrounded by the White Walkers and their army of wights, although not before Gendry flees to Eastwatch to request Daenerys Targaryen's aid. Daenerys arrives with her dragons before the group can be overrun, and it is at this point that Clegane apparently finally overcomes his fear of fire. One dragon, Viserion, is killed and eventually reanimated by the Night King, but Daenerys' group, minus Jon—who stays behind to fight back the White Walkers—can flee. Clegane joins Jon, Daenerys, and Davos as they sail to King's Landing.

At King's Landing, Clegane meets Brienne of Tarth. Despite their brutal fight earlier, they converse on civil terms. Clegane learns that Arya is alive and with her family, prompting a rare smile when Brienne informs him that Arya is now a dangerous warrior. During the summit in the Dragon Pit outside King's Landing, Clegane confronts Gregor, sees his disfigured face under his armor, and asks what they did to him before cutting off his answer and warning him again that he will come for him one day. Clegane brings out the trunk containing the wight, revealing to Cersei and Jaime Lannister the threat that lies beyond the wall. In the aftermath, Clegane sails to White Harbor with Daenerys' forces with the intention of travelling to Winterfell to aid Jon and Daenerys against the Night King.

==== Season 8 ====
The Hound joins Daenerys, Jon, and their retinues as they march to Winterfell, where he is reunited with Arya and Sansa. The Hound and Arya make peace with one another before the Battle of Winterfell against the White Walkers. During the battle, the Hound is triggered by the use of fire to destroy the wights and is close to giving up, but is convinced by Beric to keep fighting when Beric points to Arya, who is relentlessly fighting beside them.

The Hound then travels to King's Landing, intending to kill his brother, along with Arya, who intends to kill Cersei. The two infiltrate the Red Keep amongst a crowd of civilians Cersei is using as human shields, but Daenerys begins burning the city down, and the Red Keep begins to crumble. The Hound urges Arya to leave, to save herself from death and from his fate as he goes to find his brother. Arya thanks him, calling him by his true name for the first and only time, and bids him farewell. A fight ensues between the Clegane brothers, and Sandor struggles even to injure his now inhuman, partly dead brother. Gregor is momentarily disarmed after the Hound stabs him through the head, and the Hound tackles him off a stairway into the inferno below, resulting in both of their deaths.

== Reception ==
Rory McCann received praise for his portrayal of The Hound in the Game of Thrones television series. Writing for The A.V. Club, Alex McLevy praised the character's redemption arc and his dynamic with Arya Stark in the third and fourth seasons, arguing that the character had "emerged as the sentimental and humanistic heart" of the show.
