= Gregor Clegane =

Character in A Song of Ice and Fire

- A Song of Ice and Fire character Game of Thrones character
- Hafþór Júlíus Björnsson as Gregor Clegane in the promotional image for the fourth season of Game of Thrones
- First appearance: Literature: A Game of Thrones (1996); Television: "Cripples, Bastards, and Broken Things" (2011)
- Last appearance: Television: "The Bells" (2019)
- Created by: George R. R. Martin
- Adapted by: D.B. Weiss & David Benioff (Game of Thrones)
- Portrayed by: Conan Stevens (season 1); Ian Whyte (season 2); Hafþór Júlíus Björnsson (seasons 4–8)

In-universe information
- Aliases: The Mountain That Rides; The Mountain; Tywin Lannister's Mad Dog; Robert Strong
- Gender: Male
- Titles: Ser; Castellan of Harrenhal (formerly); Knight of Clegane's Keep (formerly)
- Family: House Clegane
- Relatives: Sandor Clegane (brother)

Gregor Clegane, nicknamed the "Mountain that Rides" or simply the "Mountain", is a fictional character in the A Song of Ice and Fire series of fantasy novels by American author George R. R. Martin, and its television adaptation Game of Thrones. In the books, the character is initially introduced in 1996's A Game of Thrones. He subsequently appeared in A Clash of Kings (1998), A Storm of Swords (2000) and in A Dance with Dragons (2011).

A notorious knight and retainer to House Lannister, he is well known for his enormous size, prowess in battle, extremely cruel nature, and uncontrollable temper. He is the older brother of Sandor "The Hound" Clegane, who has hated him ever since Gregor gruesomely scarred Sandor by shoving his face into a brazier when they were children. After being mortally wounded in a duel with Oberyn Martell, he is resuscitated by Qyburn via sinister means and becomes member of the Kingsguard and the personal bodyguard of Cersei Lannister.

In the HBO television adaptation, Clegane was originally portrayed by the Australian actor Conan Stevens in season one, and by the Welsh actor Ian Whyte in season two; the Icelandic actor and world champion strongman Hafþór Júlíus Björnsson took over the role in season four and continued in the role until the final season.

== Character description ==
Ser Gregor Clegane is the head of House Clegane, a landed knight vassal to House Lannister, and is the older brother of Sandor Clegane. His enormous size and strength make him a fearsome warrior (in the novels he is nearly 8 ft or 2.4 m tall, and weighs over 420 lb or 190 kg), and he has earned a reputation for unrestrained violence and cruelty.

When they were children, Gregor shoved his brother Sandor's face into a brazier simply for playing with a toy he rarely touches, gruesomely scarring and traumatizing the younger Clegane forever. Over the course of his service to Tywin Lannister, Gregor has committed numerous massacres and war crimes along with "Mountain's men", his personal band of men-at-arms, and has raped and murdered smallfolks out of nothing more than sadistic joy, but has repeatedly avoided punishment due to House Lannister's power and influence over the Iron Throne. Gregor's most infamous crime was at the end of Robert Baratheon's rebellion to overthrow the Targaryen Dynasty when Lannister soldiers, who had defected and betrayed House Targaryen, entered and sacked King's Landing. Gregor brutally raped and murdered Crown Princess Consort Elia Martell after sadistically killing her young son Aegon by shattering the child's head against a wall, a grudge House Martell still bears against the Lannisters and wants revenge upon Gregor 14 years later.

== Storylines ==
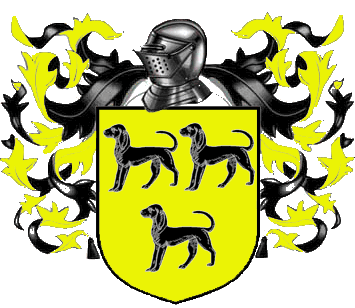
Coat of arms of House Clegane

Gregor Clegane is mostly a background character with no point of view chapters in the novels, so his actions are witnessed and interpreted through the eyes of other people, such as Arya Stark and Cersei Lannister.

=== A Song of Ice and Fire ===
In A Game of Thrones, Tywin Lannister sends him to raid the Riverlands in retaliation for Catelyn Stark's abduction of Tyrion. Beric Dondarrion is sent to arrest Gregor, but Gregor ambushes and kills him. He and his men continue raiding the Riverlands throughout A Clash of Kings. When Tyrion Lannister demands a trial by combat in A Storm of Swords, the accuser Cersei Lannister chooses Gregor as her champion. Elia's brother Oberyn Martell volunteers as Tyrion's champion to expose Gregor as a murderer. Oberyn wounds Gregor with a poisoned spear, but the Mountain is ultimately victorious, admitting to murdering Elia and Aegon before crushing Oberyn's skull. The dying Gregor is given to Qyburn for experimentation. Later Gregor's skull is sent to Doran Martell and the Sand Snakes who question if it is really Gregor's.

==== Robert Strong ====
Following Cersei's walk of atonement, Qyburn presents Ser Robert Strong as Kingsguard's newest member and Cersei's champion for her upcoming trial by combat. Strong is of similar enormous stature as Gregor, and his body is completely covered in armor. Several characters have made comments about his unnatural behaviour and have theorized about who he could be, however he is currently not confirmed to be Ser Gregor.

=== Game of Thrones (TV adaptation) ===
==== Season 1 ====
Tywin Lannister sends Ser Gregor to raid the Riverlands. Beric Dondarrion is sent to arrest Gregor. When war breaks out, Gregor is given command of Tywin's vanguard and left flank and leads his men through intimidation.

==== Season 2 ====
Ser Gregor is left to command Harrenhal in Tywin's absence and to find and destroy "The Brotherhood Without Banners", invoking the escape of Arya, Gendry and Hot Pie from Harrenhal. He later abandons Harrenhal after slaughtering the prisoners and is defeated by Edmure Tully at the Stone Mill, but manages to escape back to the Westerlands. Robb chides his uncle, having planned to draw the Mountain into a trap of his own making to be captured or killed.

==== Season 4 ====
Ser Gregor is chosen as Cersei's champion for Tyrion's trial by combat, and fights Oberyn Martell, Tyrion's champion who wants to kill Gregor as revenge for the murder of his sister, Elia Martell. Oberyn inflicts several serious injuries on Clegane with his poisoned spear, but Gregor eventually kills Oberyn by crushing his skull, while admitting that he did rape Elia, killed her children and enjoyed it, before collapsing from his own injuries. It is later revealed that The Mountain has been poisoned with manticore venom, a poison with which Oberyn had laced his weapon, and that he is slowly dying. Cersei enlists ex-maester Qyburn to save him, though Qyburn claims that the procedure will "change" Clegane.

==== Season 5 ====
The procedure is seemingly a success as Ser Gregor returns to duty, now as a kingsguard, presenting himself as Cersei returns from her walk of shame. Though Qyburn's treatment has changed his physical appearance and behavior, and seemingly made him completely mute, Qyburn explains that Ser Gregor - not naming him as such - has sworn a vow of silence and vowed to serve as Cersei's personal bodyguard until all her enemies are destroyed and evil has been driven from the realm. He picks her up and carries her into Qyburn's care, her demeanor visibly lifted.

==== Season 6 ====
Ser Gregor continues to act as Cersei's bodyguard to intimidate all those who may bother or mock her. He also rips the head off of a Faith Militant with his bare hands when they try to take Cersei into their custody. After Cersei destroys the Great Sept of Baelor and retakes power, she has Gregor torture Septa Unella in revenge for torturing her during her time in prison.

==== Season 7 ====
Ser Gregor is still with Cersei as a member of the Queensguard. He is confronted by his brother Sandor "The Hound" Clegane in the season finale, where Sandor conveys an ominous message that he (Gregor) already knows who is coming for him and that he has always known.

Ser Gregor after the procedure Qyburn used to save him following the fight against Oberyn Martell

==== Season 8 ====
Ser Gregor is present when Daenerys Targaryen arrives at King's Landing with all her forces, demanding the release of her advisor Missandei and Cersei's surrender. A defiant Cersei has Ser Gregor decapitate Missandei. Ser Gregor is killed in the penultimate episode when Cersei attempts to flee the Red Keep, meeting Gregor's vengeful brother on their way down. Sandor quickly dispatches her guards and Gregor slays Qyburn as he insists upon obeying her, instead engaging in a sword duel with Sandor (whose presence seems to break his spell of loyalty). After stubbornly fighting his brother by any means available, and even penetrating his bared face with a dagger all the way through his skull (suggesting that Gregor is, in fact, dead and reanimated by magical means; see golem), Sandor finally tackles him into an unsteady wall as the Red Keep crumbles around them. The effort is finally successful, and both brothers fall out of the stairwell into a raging inferno below.
