= Roose Bolton =

- A Song of Ice and Fire character Game of Thrones character
- Michael McElhatton as Roose Bolton
- First appearance: Literature: A Game of Thrones (1996); Television: "Garden of Bones" (2012)
- Last appearance: Television: "Home" (2016)
- Created by: George R. R. Martin
- Portrayed by: Michael McElhatton
- Voiced by: Adam Gold (Game of Thrones: Kingsroad)

In-universe information
- Aliases: Novels: The Leech Lord; Lord Leech
- Gender: Male
- Titles: Lord of the Dreadfort; Warden of the North; Lord Paramount of the North; Television: Lord of Winterfell
- Family: House Bolton
- Spouses: Unnamed first wife; "Fat" Walda Frey; Novels: Bethany Ryswell
- Children: Domeric Bolton; Ramsay Bolton; Television: Unnamed newborn (with Walda)

Roose Bolton is a fictional character in the A Song of Ice and Fire series of fantasy novels by American author George R. R. Martin, and its HBO television adaptation Game of Thrones, where he is depicted by actor Michael McElhatton.

Introduced in 1996's A Game of Thrones, Roose is lord of House Bolton, the second most powerful Northern house behind the Starks. The Boltons are notorious for their cruelty and custom of flaying their enemies. He also appears in A Clash of Kings (1998), A Storm of Swords (2000), and A Dance with Dragons (2011).

Roose joins Robb Stark's rebellion as one of his chief lieutenants. However, he secretly orchestrates the Red Wedding alongside Lord Tywin Lannister and Lord Walder Frey, receiving the title of Warden of the North and dominion over the Northern kingdom after personally murdering Robb. His rule is punctuated by unrest and several forces conspire to unseat him.

== Character ==
=== Description ===
At the beginning of A Game of Thrones, Roose is a bannerman of Lord Eddard Stark; his seat is at the Dreadfort. He is known as the Leech Lord due to regular leechings meant to improve his health, and abstains from consuming alcohol. He served House Stark in Robert's Rebellion and the Greyjoy Rebellion.

Roose is often described as an unassuming-looking man, ageless, clean-shaven, with pallid skin and an apathetic demeanor. His most prominent feature is his strangely pale and cold eyes, so light as to almost blend with the sclera. He is described as mild-mannered, but also remorseless and unforgiving. While his voice is small and soft, he does not need to raise it to inspire silence and attention; Ser Jaime Lannister and Robb Stark both remark that even just his silence is threatening. His personal motto is "A peaceful land, a quiet people". He often wears a pale pink fur cloak embroidered in blood-red to symbolize his family's custom of flaying.

Roose illicitly practices the ancient and banned tradition of the first night, in which a male lord has the right to have sexual intercourse with his female subjects on their wedding nights. This practice resulted in the birth of his bastard son, Ramsay Bolton. He ordered his depraved servant Reek to help raise the child. Roose had only one trueborn son, Domeric; Roose suspected that Ramsay had poisoned Domeric to become his heir. Left without a trueborn heir, Roose brings Ramsay to the Dreadfort to serve as its castellan.

== Storylines ==
=== Novels ===
Roose is not a point of view character in the novels, so his actions are witnessed and interpreted through the eyes of other people, such as Catelyn Stark, Arya Stark and Theon Greyjoy.

=== A Game of Thrones ===
Roose answers Robb Stark's call to arms in his campaign against the Iron Throne and House Lannister. Robb gives Roose command of part of the Northern army when the host splits up at the Twins, and he leads the attack on Tywin Lannister's forces in the Battle of the Green Fork. The battle ends in a Lannister victory, and Roose retreats with the survivors to the causeway of Moat Cailin. However, Roose's defeat allows Robb to secure a larger victory and to capture Jaime Lannister.

=== A Clash of Kings ===
To establish an alliance with House Frey, Lord Walder Frey offers Roose one of his female family members in marriage, along with her weight in silver as part of the dowry. Roose chooses Walda Frey, the fattest female of House Frey. He also makes an alliance with the Brave Companions, Essosi mercenaries originally employed by Tywin, to help the Northerners capture Harrenhal from the Lannister force occupying it. After capturing Harrenhal, Roose takes Arya Stark as a servant, mistaking her for a commoner.

=== A Storm of Swords ===
While at Harrenhal, Roose works to weaken Robb's position, sending the Northern army on suicide missions. Vargo Hoat brings Jaime Lannister to Harrenhal, having cut off Jaime's hand in the hope of blaming Roose and preventing the Boltons from allying with the Lannisters. Roose has Jaime sent back to King's Landing after Jaime assures Roose that he will not blame him. Roose then travels to the Twins for Edmure Tully's wedding to Roslin Frey. At the wedding, which is later referred to as the "Red Wedding", the Freys betray House Stark, and Roose personally murders Robb by shoving a knife through his heart. It is revealed that Roose had conspired with the Freys and Tywin Lannister to betray the Starks. As a reward for his service, Tywin names Roose the new Warden of the North.

=== A Feast for Crows and A Dance with Dragons ===
Roose returns to the North with his forces, joined by two thousand Frey men. Meeting with Ramsay—now legitimised as a Bolton—and a captive Theon Greyjoy, the Boltons travel to Barrowton for Ramsay's wedding to Jeyne Poole, who has been forced to assume the identity of Arya Stark. After hearing that Stannis Baratheon has captured Deepwood Motte, Roose decides to move the wedding to Winterfell to bait Stannis out. The Boltons and their Northern allies—many of whom are only grudgingly pledging fealty to the Boltons, or plan to betray them—remain at Winterfell after the wedding in anticipation of Stannis's attack. Tensions are high during the wedding due to the Northmen's anger at the Freys. Three of the Freys who had been traveling with Lord Wyman Manderly of White Harbor—who lost his younger son, Ser Wendel Manderly, at the Red Wedding—have vanished. It is heavily implied that they were killed and turned into pies that Wyman offers to the Freys and Boltons, some of which he eats himself. Lady Barbrey Dustin of Barrowton, the younger sister of Bethany Ryswell, tells Theon that Roose has no feelings and enjoys manipulating people for amusement. She also hints that Roose aspires to become King in the North, not just Warden, because the Lannisters are weakened. When Walder Frey's grandson, Little Walder Frey, is found murdered, their uncle Ser Hosteen Frey attacks Wyman, leading to a fight during which men from White Harbor and the Freys are killed. Roose then forces them both out of Winterfell to face Stannis, aiming to weaken both the Freys' and the Manderlys' armies.

=== Family tree of House Bolton ===
Bethany; Ryswell		Roose	"Fat" Walda; Frey
Domeric	Donella; Hornwood	Ramsay	Jeyne; Poole (Note: Ramsay marries Sansa Stark in the television adaptation Game of Thrones.)

== TV adaptation ==
Roose Bolton is played by Michael McElhatton in the HBO television adaptation of the book series. He and the rest of the cast were nominated for Screen Actors Guild Awards for Outstanding Performance by an Ensemble in a Drama Series in 2014.

=== Second season ===
Roose declares for King-in-the-North Robb Stark and serves as a chief member of his war council. After the Battle of Oxcross, Robb admonishes Roose when he advocates flaying Lannister prisoners to obtain information. After Theon Greyjoy betrays the Starks and seizes Winterfell, Roose brings the news to Robb and offers to send his bastard son, Ramsay Snow, with a force of Dreadfort men to oust Theon and the Ironborn from Winterfell.

=== Third season ===
Following the Northern army's arrival at Harrenhal, Roose presents a letter from Ramsay claiming that the Ironborn sacked Winterfell before fleeing. Robb orders Roose and the Bolton forces to hold Harrenhal while the rest of his army rides to Riverunn. One of Roose's men-at-arms, Locke, captures the escaped Jaime Lannister and his escort Brienne of Tarth, cutting off Jaime's hand in the process, before bringing the two to Harrenhal.

Roose agrees to free Jaime, but keeps Brienne as a hostage, though Jaime later returns to secure her release. Roose travels to the Twins for the wedding of Edmure Tully and Roslin Frey. However, it is revealed that Roose has conspired with Lord Walder Frey to betray the Starks, and at the wedding the Freys and Boltons slaughter the Stark forces, with Roose personally killing Robb. As part of the Bolton–Frey alliance, Roose agrees to marry Walder's daughter Walda—Walder offers him the bride's weight in silver as dowry, so Roose decides to marry the fattest of Walder's daughters. In the aftermath of the massacre, Roose reveals that Winterfell was actually sacked by his bastard Ramsay, who subsequently flayed the Ironborn garrison there and took Theon prisoner. He also hints at a more personal motivation for his betrayal, saying he was insulted by Robb "ignoring" his advice. As a reward for his defection, Tywin Lannister names Roose the Warden of the North.

=== Fourth season ===
With the Ironborn holding Moat Cailin—the fortification barring passage between the North and the rest of Westeros—Roose is forced to smuggle himself back into the North. Upon his return to the Dreadfort, he chastises Ramsay for having gelded Theon and sending terms of surrender to the Greyjoys without his approval, while reminding Ramsay of his bastard parentage. Insulted, Ramsay demonstrates how effectively he has broken Theon (whom he has since renamed "Reek") by having Reek shave him, even after revealing Roose's murder of Robb, while also coaxing Reek into revealing he faked the deaths of Bran Stark and Rickon Stark. After Ramsay points out that the other Northerners will turn on the Boltons if it is revealed that there is a living male Stark, Roose tasks Locke with hunting down Bran and Rickon and killing Jon Snow, Robb's bastard half-brother. Roose also sends Ramsay and Reek to lift the siege of Moat Cailin; when Ramsay is successful, Roose presents him with a royal decree of legitimization as a trueborn Bolton. Roose subsequently moves to rebuild and occupy Winterfell.

=== Fifth season ===
In the aftermath of Tywin Lannister's death and Ramsay's murder of a disobedient vassal and his family, Roose seeks to secure House Bolton's position by arranging to have Ramsay marry Sansa Stark. In doing so, Roose seemingly secures an alliance with the forces of The Vale and its Lord Protector Petyr Baelish. After Ramsay torments Sansa by having Reek serve them at dinner, Roose announces that he and Walda are expecting a son. However, later Roose privately reassures Ramsay of his position as his heir, and asks him to assist in defeating Stannis Baratheon's army. To this end, Roose permits Ramsay and his men to launch a sneak attack on Stannis' camp, destroying the army's supplies. With the supplies destroyed and most of Stannis' army subsequently deserting him, the Boltons easily defeat Stannis's army when they attempt to lay siege to Winterfell, but in the aftermath of the battle, Theon Greyjoy and Sansa manage to escape, severely jeopardizing House Bolton's rule in the North.

=== Sixth season ===
Despite their victory over Stannis, Roose warns Ramsay that the North will someday have to face the Lannisters, and chastises him for allowing Sansa and Theon to escape, as Sansa was crucial to unifying the North. He implies that if Sansa is not recovered, Ramsay's position as heir may be usurped by Walda's baby. Soon afterwards, it is announced that Walda has given birth to a boy; Ramsay immediately kills Roose by stabbing him in the stomach, before setting his dogs upon Walda and the baby, leaving Ramsay as the last remaining Bolton. Ramsay is ultimately killed when Jon Snow retakes Winterfell in the Battle of the Bastards, leaving House Bolton extinct.
