= Tywin Lannister =

Character in A Song of Ice and Fire and Game of Thrones

- A Song of Ice and Fire character Game of Thrones character
- Charles Dance as Lord Tywin Lannister
- First appearance: Literature: A Game of Thrones (1996); Television: "You Win or You Die" (2011)
- Last appearance: Literature: A Storm of Swords (2000); Television: "The Wars to Come" (2015)
- Created by: George R. R. Martin
- Based on: Edward I of England, Philip IV of France
- Adapted by: D.B. Weiss & David Benioff (Game of Thrones)
- Portrayed by: Charles Dance

In-universe information
- Aliases: The Lion of Lannister; The Old Lion; The Great Lion of the Rock
- Gender: Male
- Titles: Lord of Casterly Rock; Shield of Lannisport; Warden of the West; Hand of the King; Savior of the City; Television: Lord Paramount of the Westerlands
- Family: House Lannister
- Spouse: Joanna Lannister (cousin)
- Children: Cersei Lannister; Jaime Lannister; Tyrion Lannister
- Relatives: Tytos Lannister (father); Jeyne Marbrand (mother); Kevan Lannister (brother); Genna Lannister (sister); Tygett Lannister (brother); Gerion Lannister (brother); Joffrey Baratheon (grandson); Myrcella Baratheon (granddaughter); Tommen Baratheon (grandson); Lancel Lannister (nephew); Willem Lannister (nephew); Martyn Lannister (nephew); Janei Lannister (niece); Cleos Frey (nephew); Lyonel Frey (nephew); Tion Frey (nephew); Walder Frey (nephew); Tyrek Lannister (nephew); Joy Hill (niece)

Tywin Lannister (/ˈtaɪwɪn/ TY-win) is a fictional character in the fantasy series A Song of Ice and Fire by American novelist George R. R. Martin and a major character in its television adaptation, Game of Thrones. He is introduced in A Game of Thrones (1996) and subsequently appears in A Clash of Kings (1998) and A Storm of Swords (2000). Tywin was portrayed by English actor Charles Dance in the HBO series to widespread acclaim.

Tywin is the ruthless head of House Lannister of Casterly Rock and father to twins Cersei and Jaime, and Tyrion. He is the Warden of the West and the Lord Paramount of the Westerlands and was twice the Hand of the King, making him one of the most powerful political figures in Westerosi history. His cruelty towards his youngest son, Tyrion, whom Tywin has despised since Tyrion's childhood for being a dwarf and killing his wife in childbirth, is a primary influence on Tyrion's character arc in both the novels and television show. Both Philip IV of France and Edward I of England served as inspirations for Tywin.

== Character overview ==
Tywin is Lord of Casterly Rock, Shield of Lannisport, and Warden of the West. Born heir apparent to Lord Tytos Lannister, who was perceived as a weak and ineffectual leader, often ridiculed by his bannermen, and was known as "the toothless lion", Tywin developed an early distrust of mockery and laughter. When the Lannister bannermen of Houses Reyne and Tarbeck eventually revolted against the Lannisters' rule, the 19-year-old Tywin led the Lannister army in defeating the rebellious vassals by exterminating their Houses. The song "The Rains of Castamere" was written as a tribute to the event.

Tywin eventually married his first cousin, Joanna. When she died giving birth to their dwarf son Tyrion, it is said that "the best part of Tywin died with her". He never remarried. Tywin strongly resents Tyrion for Joanna's death. When Tywin discovered that the young Tyrion had secretly eloped and married Tysha, a peasant's daughter, he had Tyrion's marriage forcefully annulled, telling him that the entire love affair was a plot by Jaime to get Tyrion to lose his virginity, his love being nothing more than a hired prostitute. Tywin then had his guards gang-rape Tysha in front of Tyrion and forced Tyrion to rape her last.

When Aerys II Targaryen became King of Westeros, he appointed Tywin Hand of the King, a position regarded as deputy and second-in-command to the King, making Tywin the second-most powerful man in the realm. Over the years, as Aerys became increasingly paranoid, he stopped trusting Tywin, believing him to have become too powerful. He appointed Tywin's eldest son Jaime to the Kingsguard, robbing Tywin of his preferred heir. After that, Tywin resigned as Hand of the King and returned to Casterly Rock.

During Robert Baratheon's rebellion, Tywin remained neutral until Robert had all but won the war. He then captured King's Landing through treachery and ordered the murder of the royal family before Ned Stark could capture the city. Fearing Tywin's wrath, the Mad King ordered Jaime to kill his father and commanded the city of King's Landing to be burned down with wildfire. Instead, Jaime murdered Aerys, betraying his vow to protect the king and earning the hatred of Westeros, despite saving the city's population. Following the war, Tywin agreed to a marriage between his daughter Cersei and the new king Robert Baratheon, who pardoned Jaime and allowed him to continue his service as a member of the Kingsguard. Tywin returned to Casterly Rock to rule the Westerlands. At the beginning of the series, Tywin is described as a broad-shouldered man in his fifties with thin but muscled arms. After he had started going bald, he began shaving his head but grew out bushy golden side-whiskers. He is said to have pale green eyes flecked with gold.

Tywin Lannister is not a point of view character in the novels, so his actions are witnessed and interpreted mainly through the eyes of his estranged dwarf son, Tyrion Lannister.

=== Television adaptation ===
Tywin Lannister's background remains largely the same in the television adaptation of the book series, with some minor changes. In the show, he is given the new title "Lord Paramount of the Westerlands," which was not present in any of the A Song of Ice and Fire novels. Tywin's role in the series, however, is much more prominent compared to the books.

Charles Dance was cast as Tywin in the first season of HBO's Game of Thrones, and portrayed the character in the first four seasons. He was cast for the role based on his performance in Alien 3.

== Storylines ==
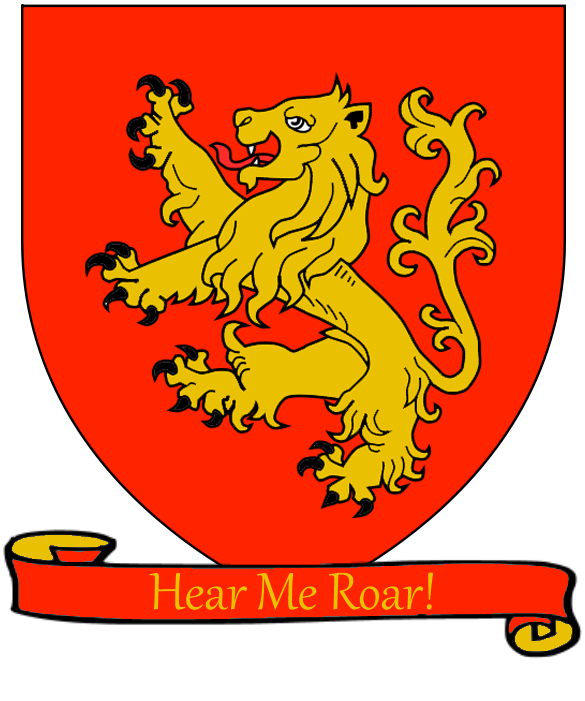
Coat of arms of House Lannister

=== A Game of Thrones ===
Tyrion is arrested by Catelyn Stark, who suspects him of attempting to assassinate her son Bran. Despite his contempt for Tyrion, Tywin views his kidnapping as a slight against his family and sends Gregor Clegane to raid Catelyn's homeland, the Riverlands. He raises a host of almost 40,000 men, half of whom are given to Jaime to besiege the Riverlands' capital Riverrun. Tywin's half of the force battle a Northern host led by Roose Bolton at the Battle of the Green Fork, but in the meantime Robb Stark's men rout Jaime's army and take him prisoner. Tywin is named Hand of the King by the new king, his grandson Joffrey Baratheon, but Tywin decides to remain in the Riverlands to continue the campaign against the Starks, sending Tyrion to King's Landing as acting Hand in his stead.

=== A Clash of Kings ===
Tywin's at Harrenhal, using it as a base for the war in the Riverlands. When Joffrey's uncle and rival claimant Renly Baratheon is killed and Joffrey's other uncle Stannis Baratheon besieges Storm's End, Tywin decides to use the distraction to march west in pursuit of Robb's army. Robb intends for Tywin's army to be gradually dismantled by the long march, but Robb's uncle Ser Edmure Tully, unaware of the plan, confronts Tywin's forces at the Battle of the Fords. Although Tywin suffers heavy losses, the delay in his march allows him to receive word that Stannis is now marching on King's Landing. Tywin quickly leads the army on King's Landing, joining forces with Renly's former bannermen House Tyrell along the way, and arrives at King's Landing in time to force Stannis to retreat. Joffrey subsequently names Tywin Hand of the King, for the second time, and declares him "Savior of the City".

=== A Storm of Swords ===
Tywin assumes his role as Hand of the King, demoting Tyrion to Master of Coin. He forces Tyrion to marry Sansa Stark, though his efforts to have Cersei wed to Willas Tyrell are rebuffed. Having learned that Robb has invalidated a marriage proposal to House Frey by marrying Jeyne Westerling, Tywin enters into communications with Lord Walder Frey and Roose Bolton (who has lost faith in Robb after Theon Greyjoy's capture of Robb's castle Winterfell). The three conspire to have Robb and his army slaughtered while camped at The Twins for Edmure Tully's wedding, and the War of Five Kings results in victory for House Lannister. However, Joffrey is poisoned soon after during his own wedding. Tyrion is accused of the murder, ultimately being found guilty and sentenced to death. Jaime and Varys release Tyrion from his cell, Jaime confessing that he felt compelled to do so for lying about Tysha, Tyrion's first wife, who had been wrongly stated by Tywin to be a prostitute and gang-raped by Tywin's guards. Enraged, Tyrion enters Tywin's quarters through a secret tunnel, only to find his former mistress Shae in Tywin's bed. He strangles her with the Hand's necklace, then confronts Tywin with a crossbow while he is on the privy, demanding to know what happened to Tysha. When Tywin repeatedly and scornfully dismisses Tysha as a "whore," Tyrion fatally shoots him with the crossbow and leaves him dead. As Tywin's bowels loosens upon death, Tyrion remarks to himself that the claim that his father shits gold is, after all, a myth.

=== A Feast for Crows ===
Tywin's poorly embalmed corpse lies in state for seven days at the Great Sept of Baelor, before being returned to the Westerlands (it is unclear whether the botched embalming was deliberate or accidental).

=== Family tree of House Lannister ===
Descendants of Tytos Lannister

Tytos	Jeyne; Marbrand
Joanna	Tywin	Emmon; Frey	Genna	Kevan	Dorna; Swyft	Tygett	Darlessa; Marbrand	Gerion	Briony
Robert; Baratheon	Cersei	Jaime	Tysha (Note: Tyrion's first wife was a peasant girl named Tysha. The marriage was later annulled by Lord Tywin's order.)	Tyrion	Sansa; Stark	Amerei; Frey	Lancel	Martyn	Willem	Janei	Tyrek	Ermesande; Hayford	Joy; Hill
Joffrey; Baratheon (Note: Though officially Robert's children, Joffrey, Myrcella and Tommen are the products of an incestuous affair between Cersei and Jaime.)	Myrcella; Baratheon	Margaery; Tyrell	Tommen; Baratheon	Tion; Frey	"Red" Walder; Frey	Jeyne; Darry	Cleos; Frey	Lyonel; Frey	Melesa Crakehall
Tywin; Frey	Willem; Frey

References and notes:

== TV adaptation ==
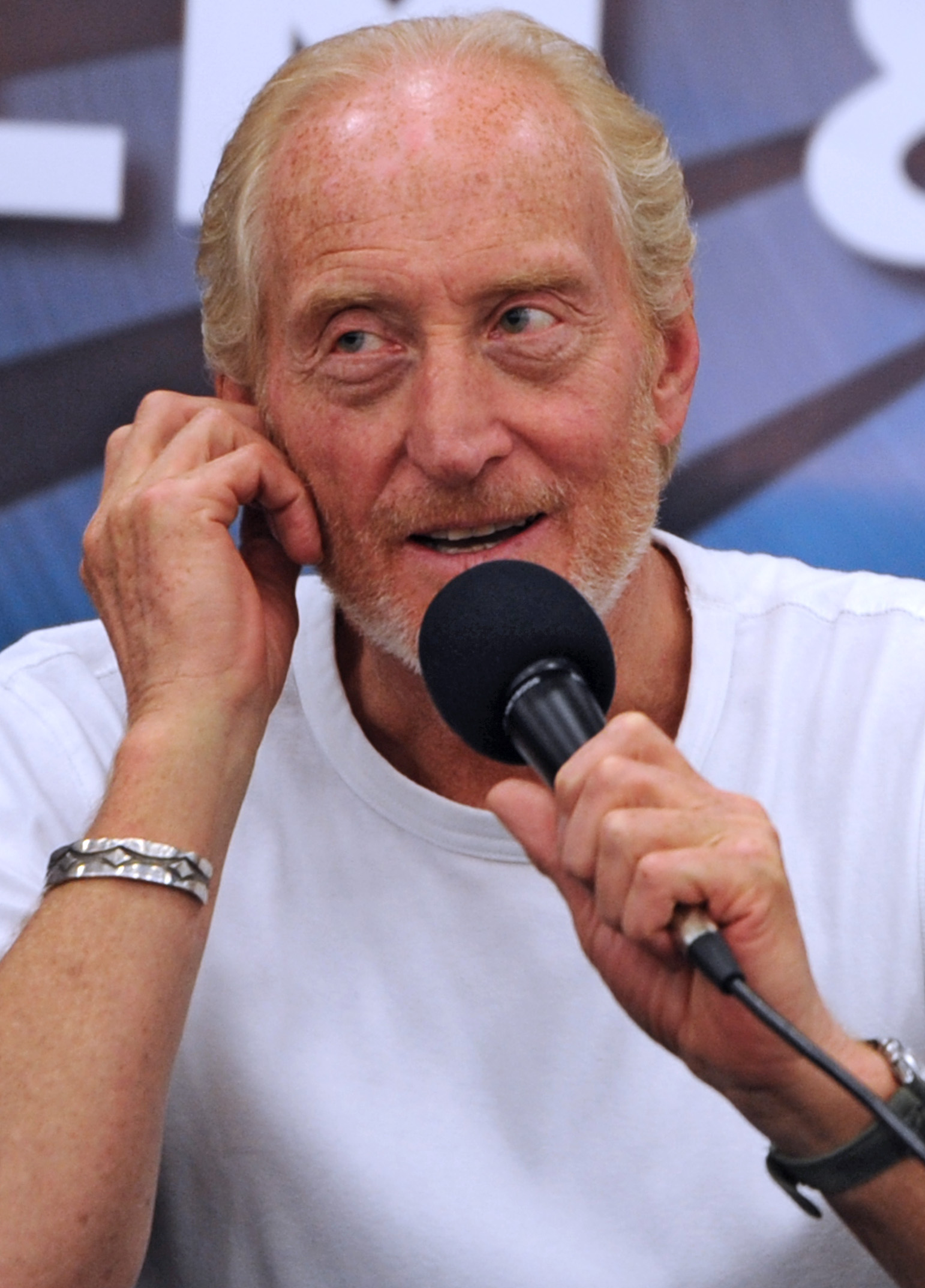
Charles Dance plays the role in the television series.

=== Season 1 ===
After Tyrion Lannister's arrest by Catelyn Stark, Tywin sends his bannerman Gregor Clegane to raid Catelyn's homeland, the Riverlands.

Later on, Jaime is seen in Tywin's camp reading a royal command issued by Ned Stark on behalf of the Crown summoning Tywin to appear before the court to answer for an attack on the Riverlands by Gregor Clegane. Tywin chastises Jaime for openly attacking Ned when Jaime states he did so on hearing of Tyrion's arrest. He gives half of his men (30,000) to Jaime to besiege House Tully's ancestral home of Riverrun. Jaime is surprised that Tywin places such a high value on Tyrion's life, but Tywin states that he is merely doing this to protect his family's honor, as allowing another house to keep a member of the Lannister family prisoner would weaken their family's position.

Tywin is tricked by Robb Stark into taking his men to the Trident where he believes Robb intends to fight his army. Instead, Robb leads his forces to Riverrun, where he defeats the Lannister forces and captures Jaime.

When Joffrey Baratheon ascends as king, he executes King Robert's Hand, Ned Stark, who openly questioned Joffrey's paternity and claim as Robert's heir, names Tywin as his Hand. Tywin who currently has only half of his army is now engaged in multiple conflicts, with Robb in the North and Stannis Baratheon & Renly Baratheon in the South.

Tywin cannot make peace with the Baratheon brothers as they are staking a claim of Kingship of the Seven Kingdoms. Ned's execution by Joffrey on the other hand has prevented Tywin from what would have been the best option of suing for peace with the Northern Lord and Riverrun. Realizing this Tywin sends Tyrion to King's Landing as acting Hand, while he decides to regroup at Harrenhal with all his forces and continue the campaign in the Riverlands against Robb who now holds his son captive.

=== Season 2 ===
Tywin and the Westermen regroup at Harrenhal and start establishing order. Unaware of Arya Stark's true identity, he takes her as his cupbearer and is impressed by her quick wit. Arya, on the other hand, is seen to be contemplating to kill Tywin, but does not proceed due to lack of opportunity. She is able to gather information on the plan of his council members on their next course of action.

On Petyr Baelish's suggestion, Tywin establishes an alliance with House Tyrell as they have the required army and the largest supply of grain and livestock. His council members advise that his grandson King Joffrey and Joffrey's mother Cersei flee the capital as Stannis Baratheon and his forces will be attacking. Tywin overrules his council members, stating that Joffrey needs to hold his ground as no one will respect a king who runs away. He then quickly, either changing his mind upon news of Stannis' landing or completing an elaborate ruse, march quickly to join with the Tyrell forces and then towards the capital.

Tywin leads his forces along with their new allies of House Tyrell on the city and arrives just in time to defeat Stannis' forces. After the battle, Tywin is once again named Hand of the King in his own right, as well as given the honorific "Savior of the City", but not before his horse visibly defecates on the floor before the throne room.

=== Season 3 ===
Tywin harshly denies Tyrion his request to be named as heir to Casterly Rock, but does acquiesce to naming him Master of Coin. When he learns of Olenna Tyrell's plot to have Loras Tyrell wed Sansa Stark, he arranges to have Tyrion and Cersei marry Sansa and Loras respectively — though only succeeds with establishing Tyrion's marriage to Sansa. Later on, Tywin lectures Joffrey about how to rule as king when his grandson demands a report on his council meetings. Soon after Tyrion and Sansa's wedding, Tywin forms an alliance with Robb Starks' dissatisfied bannermen — Walder Frey and Roose Bolton — to finish the Stark forces and claim at "The Red Wedding" massacre. Roose executes Robb while taunting "the Lannisters send their regards", Robb's mother Catelyn and wife Talisa are brutally killed as well. When news of Robb's death reaches the Lannisters, Tyrion quickly deduces that his father masterminded the event. Tywin confirms this and shrewdly observes that this means the Freys will get all the credit but also all the blame — since the Northerners will never forget nor forgive such a terrible crime. Tywin senses that his son finds the action dishonorable but insists it was done to protect the family and end the war.

He is forced to contend with an increasingly belligerent Joffrey, who insists that his father Robert (refusing to believe the claim regarding his parentage) won the war by his sword, while chiding his grandfather as a coward who "hid under Casterly Rock". Tywin sends his grandson to bed and promises to teach him the realities of ruling, before reminding Tyrion of Joffrey's limited power and of his husbandly duty to impregnate Sansa and again insists that a man who puts family first will always triumph. When Tyrion asks his father whether he has ever put the family's interests ahead of his own, Tywin retorts by stating his desire to euthanise Tyrion at birth out of rage and grief but instead let Tyrion live and ended up raising him "as my son", showing that he has disowned his parentage of Tyrion as well.

=== Season 4 ===
Tywin has the Stark ancestral sword Ice melted down into two swords, one of which he gives to Jaime, though he disowns him after Jaime refuses to resign from the Kingsguard to become Tywin's heir. When Tyrion is accused of poisoning Joffrey, Tywin asks Oberyn Martell to serve as one of the judges in Tyrion's trial. Though Oberyn despises Tywin for ordering the death of his sister, niece and nephew during the sack of King's Landing, he agrees when Tywin offers him justice against their murderer, Gregor Clegane. Tywin also presses Cersei to wed Loras Tyrell to use House Tyrell's wealth to pay off the Crown's debts to the Iron Bank of Braavos but is forced to back down when Cersei threatens to reveal her incestuous affair with Jaime. Tywin has an affair with Shae, Tyrion's former mistress. Tyrion discovers this during his escape from King's Landing and strangles Shae before confronting Tywin on the privy. When Tyrion admits that he loved Shae, Tywin repeatedly dismisses her as a whore, prompting Tyrion to shoot him with a crossbow, killing him.

=== Season 5 ===
Tywin's body lies in state in the Great Sept of Baelor before his burial, with Jaime and Cersei the first to pay their respects. Tywin's death upsets the balance of power in King's Landing, namely by allowing the rise to power of the High Sparrow and the Faith Militant.

== Reception ==
Charles Dance, who played Tywin Lannister in the first four seasons of the television adaptation, received widespread acclaim for his performance from fans and critics, with some singling out his performance as one of the best of the series. Clive James described his portrayal as "not only the best role of its kind that Dance has ever had; it is the best role of its kind that anyone has ever had".
