= Khaleesi (disambiguation) =

Khaleesi is a fictional character and fictional title of Daenerys Targaryen from A Song of Ice and Fire by George R.R. Martin, featured on the TV show adaptation Game of Thrones.

Khaleesi may also refer to:

- Khaleesi (given name), a female given name originating from the fictional creation of G.R.R.M. and GoT
- Khaleesi (wolf), a genetically modified grey wolf created by Colossal Biosciences in 2025
- Khaleesi Sherbrooke, a Great Pyrenees dog, ceremonial mayor of Cormorant Township, Becker County, Minnesota, USA
- Khaleesi Tower, 41 West 57th St., Manhattan, NYC, NYS, USA; a proposed tower by architect Mark Foster Gage
- Marianina khaleesi (M. khaleesi), a species of sea slug; also known as Tritonia khaleesi (T. khaleesi)
- Khaleesi virus, a nickname for calicivirus (CV)
- "Khaleesi" (song), a 2019 song by 3 Are Legend and W&W
- Khaleesi (yacht), a 14 m (46 ft) Mills DK46 class racing yacht that participated in the 2017 and 2021 Sydney to Hobart Yacht Race
- Khaleesi (yacht), a 37 m (121 ft) superyacht built by Perini Navi; see List of large sailing yachts

== See also ==
- Khalissi (disambiguation)
- Calici (disambiguation)
