= Arya Stark =

Character in A Song of Ice and Fire and Game of Thrones

- A Song of Ice and Fire character Game of Thrones character
- Maisie Williams as Arya Stark
- First appearance: Literature: A Game of Thrones (1996); Television: "Winter Is Coming" (2011)
- Last appearance: Television: "The Iron Throne" (2019)
- Created by: George R. R. Martin
- Adapted by: D.B. Weiss & David Benioff (Game of Thrones)
- Portrayed by: Maisie Williams
- Voiced by: Maisie Williams (MultiVersus)

In-universe information
- Aliases: POV aliases: Cat of the Canals; The Blind Girl; The Ugly Little Girl; Mercy; Novels: Arya Horseface; Arya Underfoot; Lumpyhead; Lumpyface; Stickboy; Rabbitkiller; Weasel; Nymeria; Nan; Squab; Squirrel; Blood Child; Wolf Girl; Salty; Night Wolf; Blind Beth; The Blind Girl; The Gorgeous Girl; Mercedene; Mercy; Both mediums: Arry; No One; Mercy; Television: Lanna of the Canals; This girl has no name
- Gender: Female
- Occupation: Assassin
- Family: House Stark
- Significant others: Television: Gendry
- Relatives: Eddard Stark (father); Catelyn Tully (mother); Robb Stark (brother); Sansa Stark (sister); Bran Stark (brother); Rickon Stark (brother); Theon Greyjoy (foster brother); Rickard Stark (grandfather); Lyarra Stark (grandmother); Brandon Stark (uncle); Lyanna Stark (aunt); Benjen Stark (uncle); Hoster Tully (grandfather); Minisa Whent (grandmother); Lysa Tully (aunt); Edmure Tully (uncle); Brynden Tully (granduncle); Robert Arryn (cousin); Novels: Jon Snow (half-brother); Television: Jon Snow (cousin/adoptive brother)
- Origin: Winterfell, The North

Arya Stark is a fictional character in American author George R. R. Martin's A Song of Ice and Fire epic fantasy novel series and its HBO television adaptation Game of Thrones, where she was portrayed by English actress Maisie Williams. She is a prominent point-of-view character in the novels with the third most viewpoint chapters (behind Tyrion Lannister and Jon Snow) and is the only character to have a viewpoint chapter in every published book of the series, with her chapters having various alternative titles such as "Cat of the Canals", "The Blind Girl", "The Ugly Little Girl" and "Mercy" from the fourth book onwards.

Introduced in 1996's A Game of Thrones, Arya is the third child and youngest daughter of Lord Eddard Stark and his wife Lady Catelyn Stark. She is tomboyish, headstrong, feisty, independent, disdains traditional female pursuits, and is often mistaken for a boy. She wields a castle-forged steel smallsword named "Needle" forged by Mikken, the blacksmith of Winterfell, as a parting gift from her half-brother Jon Snow, and is trained in the Braavosi style of sword fighting by Syrio Forel.

== Character ==
Arya Stark was born 289 years after the conquest of Westeros by King Aegon I Targaryen as the third child and youngest daughter of Lord Eddard Stark and Lady Catelyn Stark of Winterfell, the ruling liege of the North. She is nine years old at the start of the book series. (She is 11 years old in season 1 of the HBO television show.) She has five siblings: an older brother named Robb, an older sister named Sansa, two younger brothers, Bran and Rickon, and an older illegitimate half-brother, Jon Snow. Through her mother, she is also a first cousin to Robert Arryn, the lord paramount of the Vale of Arryn; she is also the niece of Edmure Tully, the lord paramount of the Riverlands.

Arya is left-handed and talented in sums and housekeeping. In contrast to her sister, Sansa, who is praised for favoring activities traditionally befitting a noblewoman, Arya is a tomboy who shows no interest in dancing, singing, and sewing; rather, she revels in outdoor activities and exploring and is an excellent horserider. She is described as "wolf-blooded", blunt, impulsive, and "always difficult to tame" by her mother; has proven to be a constant source of headaches for her household tutor, Septa Mordane; and is given the nickname "Arya Underfoot" by the guards of Winterfell. Socially an outcast among her peer group of young noblewomen, she is particularly close to her bastard half-brother Jon, who encourages her and gives her a smallsword as a parting gift upon his leaving for the Night's Watch. The sword, which Arya names "Needle" after her dreaded embroidery lessons, is well suited to her slender build and favoring the Braavosi "Water Dance" (fencing) style of swordplay, which emphasizes speed and agility with quick thrusting attacks. Throughout her travels, Arya displays great resourcefulness and cunning and also becomes increasingly ruthless.

Arya is the only one out of her full-siblings to inherit the Stark features of a lean, athletic physique, brown hair, grey eyes, and long face (for which she was teased as "Horseface" by Sansa's lady's companions) and is said to resemble her late aunt Lyanna Stark in both looks and temperament. At the start of the novel series, she is prepubescent, generally regarded as messy and plain-looking, and often mistaken for a boy; there are multiple instances in the books, however, in she is compared favorably to the famously beautiful Lyanna. She is frequently catching the eyes of men—to the point of sexual harassment—when her body starts to develop later in the series. She is also a powerful skin-changer, developing on her own instinct the ability to telepathically control her direwolf, Nymeria, across entire continents while sleeping, as well as forming a psychic bond with a feral cat in Braavos.

== Storylines ==
=== Novels ===
==== A Game of Thrones ====
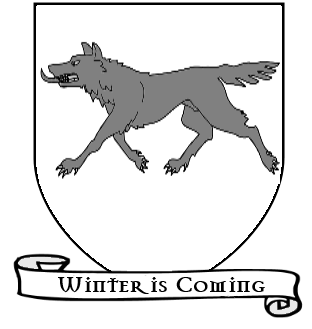
Coat of arms of House Stark

Arya adopts one of the direwolf cubs that her brothers Robb and Jon discover in the wild, naming her "Nymeria" after a legendary Rhoynish warrior queen. She travels with her father, Eddard, to King's Landing when he is made Hand of the King. Before she leaves, her half-brother, Jon, has a Braavosi-style smallsword made for her as a parting gift, which she names "Needle" after her least favorite ladylike activity, needlepoint.

While taking a walk together, Prince Joffrey Baratheon and her sister, Sansa, happen upon Arya and her friend Mycah, the low-born butcher's son, sparring in the woods with broomsticks. Arya defends Mycah from Joffrey's torments, and her direwolf, Nymeria, helps Arya fight off Joffrey, wounding his arm in the process. Knowing that Nymeria will likely be killed in retribution, Arya chases her wolf away. Sansa's direwolf, Lady, is killed in Nymeria's stead, and Mycah is hunted down and killed by Sandor Clegane ("the Hound"), Joffrey's bodyguard.

In King's Landing, her father discovers Arya's possession of Needle, but instead of confiscating it, he arranges for sword-fighting lessons under the Braavosi swordmaster Syrio Forel, who teaches her the style of fighting known as "water dancing". After her father's arrest, Syrio is killed protecting Arya, and she narrowly escapes capture. In her escape, she makes her first kill: a stable hand who was going to turn her in to the queen, Cersei Lannister. She later witnesses the public execution of her father before falling under the protection of the Night's Watch recruiter Yoren, albeit with a false identity.

==== A Clash of Kings ====
Arya escapes King's Landing with Yoren and his party of recruits, pretending to be a boy named Arry; on the road, she clashes with the other Night's Watch child-recruits Lommy, Gendry, and Hot Pie, but eventually befriends them. On the way, the party is attacked by Amory Lorch when Yoren refuses to yield Gendry, who is actually a bastard son of the late King Robert Baratheon, to House Lannister guardsmen. The Night's Watch convoy is overrun and massacred, but Arya and the other children escape through a tunnel. Before escaping, she rescues three prisoners locked in a wagon cage, among them a mysterious man named Jaqen H'ghar.

Arya and her now-friends are later captured by Ser Gregor Clegane and taken to Harrenhal as slave-laborers. After witnessing the torture and death of her fellow prisoners, Arya begins nightly reciting the names of the people upon whom she wishes to exact revenge. At Harrenhal, she re-encounters Jaqen, now under the employ of the Lannisters, who offers to kill for her any three people she names. She first names two people who hurt her at Harrenhal. When Jaqen asks her to name the last target, Arya extorts him to help her free Northern prisoners by naming Jaqen himself as the third person. In order to get Arya to retract the name, Jaqen stages a massive prison riot that overwhelms the Lannister garrison. Afterwards, Jaqen offers to take Arya with him, but Arya expresses a wish to go home. He gives Arya a strange Braavosi iron coin to ensure her induction into his guild, known as the Faceless Men, and tells her to remember the passphrase "valar morghūlis" (lit. 'all men must die' in High Valyrian) before leaving. The next morning, Roose Bolton captures the castle, and Arya becomes his personal cupbearer. Eventually, Arya escapes Harrenhal with her friends Gendry and Hot Pie after killing a guard.

==== A Storm of Swords ====
While Arya and her companions are making their way North, she begins dreaming of her lost direwolf, Nymeria. Later, she and her companions are discovered by a guerrilla group, the Brotherhood Without Banners, and she is recognized as Arya Stark. At the Brotherhood's secret base, Arya encounters Sandor Clegane, and she accuses him of Mycah's murder. The Hound survives a trial by combat and is released.

Arya eventually escapes the Brotherhood alone but is captured by the Hound, who plans to return her to her family for a ransom. The pair reaches the Twins just as her brother and mother are killed during the "Red Wedding", and Sandor knocks her unconscious to prevent her from being killed. A few nights later, Arya skinchanges into Nymeria during sleep and pulls her mother's corpse out of the river for the Brotherhood to find. Later, Sandor plans to ransom her to her aunt Lysa in the Vale but is unable to proceed due to the weather; he decides to take her to her great-uncle, Brynden Tully of Riverrun, instead. On the way to Riverrun, they encounter two men on Arya's death list, "the Tickler" and Polliver, both of whom were Gregor Clegane's men-at-arms at Harrenhal. In the ensuing fight, Arya personally stabs the Tickler to death and reclaims her sword, Needle, from Polliver's corpse, but Sandor is severely injured. When Sandor becomes gravely ill from his wounds, Arya refuses to kill him and abandons him to die under a tree by the Trident River. She travels to the port town of Saltpan and gains passage to Braavos on a merchant galleass, Titan's Daughter, by presenting the ship's captain with the iron coin that Jaqen gave her along with the Valyrian phrase "valar morghūlis".

==== A Feast for Crows ====
Arriving in Braavos, Arya makes her way to the headquarters of the Faceless Men, the House of Black and White, where she is initiated into the guild by the House's priest in charge, whom she calls "the Kindly Man". The Kindly Man orders her to dispose of all her possessions, and she complies by throwing them all in the river. However, she secretly hides her sword, Needle, the one thing that reminds her of sweet childhood memories. For her training, Arya adopts the identity of "Cat of the Canal", a street child who helps sell seafood, and continues to have increasingly frequent, vivid dreams of direwolves that further prevent her from discarding her old identity. During her training, she briefly meets (and saves) Samwell Tarly and later murders the Night's Watch deserter Dareon. After admitting her unauthorized killing to her mentor, she is given a cup of "burnt-tasting" milk to drink; the next morning, she wakes up blind.

==== A Dance with Dragons ====
Arya remains blind in the service of the House of Black and White for half a year. She continues to dream through the eyes of her direwolf, Nymeria, but speaks of it to no one. While she is blind, Arya wanders the streets of Braavos under the identity of "Beth", a blind beggar girl, and becomes better at sensing without her eyes, as well as lying and detecting the lies of others.

After skinchanging into a stray tomcat that followed her back to the temple, Arya is able to identify the Kindly Man as the person who sneak-attacks her with a stick every night and later surprise-hits him. For this achievement, she passes her test of blindness and regains her vision, and she is given her first assassination assignment. When she successfully poisons a crooked insurance salesperson without rousing any suspicion or collateral damage, the Kindly Man gives Arya an acolyte's robe and assigns her to begin her first apprenticeship embedded within a theatrical group.

==== The Winds of Winter ====
An excerpt chapter from the yet-to-be-published sixth book of the series, named "Mercy", was released on George R. R. Martin's official website on March 27, 2014. In the chapter, Arya assumes the identity of an apprentice stage actress under the alias Mercedene ("Mercy", for short). She performs in a Braavosi theatrical play, The Bloody Hand, a dramatized parody of the recent Westerosi political events in King's Landing, in which she plays a maiden and rape victim of the titular evil dwarf Hand: a demonized version of Tyrion Lannister.

When the Westerosi treasurer Harys Swyft arrives in Braavos with an envoy to negotiate with the Iron Bank for loans, Arya's theatre group is employed to perform the play to entertain the guests. As the play is about to begin, Arya recognizes one of the envoy guards as Rafford (also known as Raff "the Sweetling"), a former subordinate of Gregor Clegane who killed her friend Lommy. She seduces Rafford and lures him to her room before slicing his femoral artery, rendering him unable to walk. When Rafford begs for a healer, Arya cuts his throat in the same fashion that he had killed Lommy and throws his corpse into a canal. She heads back to perform the play, knowing this murder will most likely ruin her Mercedene identity.

=== Family tree of House Stark ===
Descendants of Rickard Stark

Rickard	Lyarra
Brandon	Catelyn; Tully	Eddard	Lyanna (Note: In season 7 of the TV series Game of Thrones, Jon is revealed to be the son of Rhaegar Targaryen and Lyanna.)	Benjen
Robb	Jeyne; Westerling	Sansa	Tyrion; Lannister	Arya	Brandon	Rickon	Jon; Snow

=== Television series ===
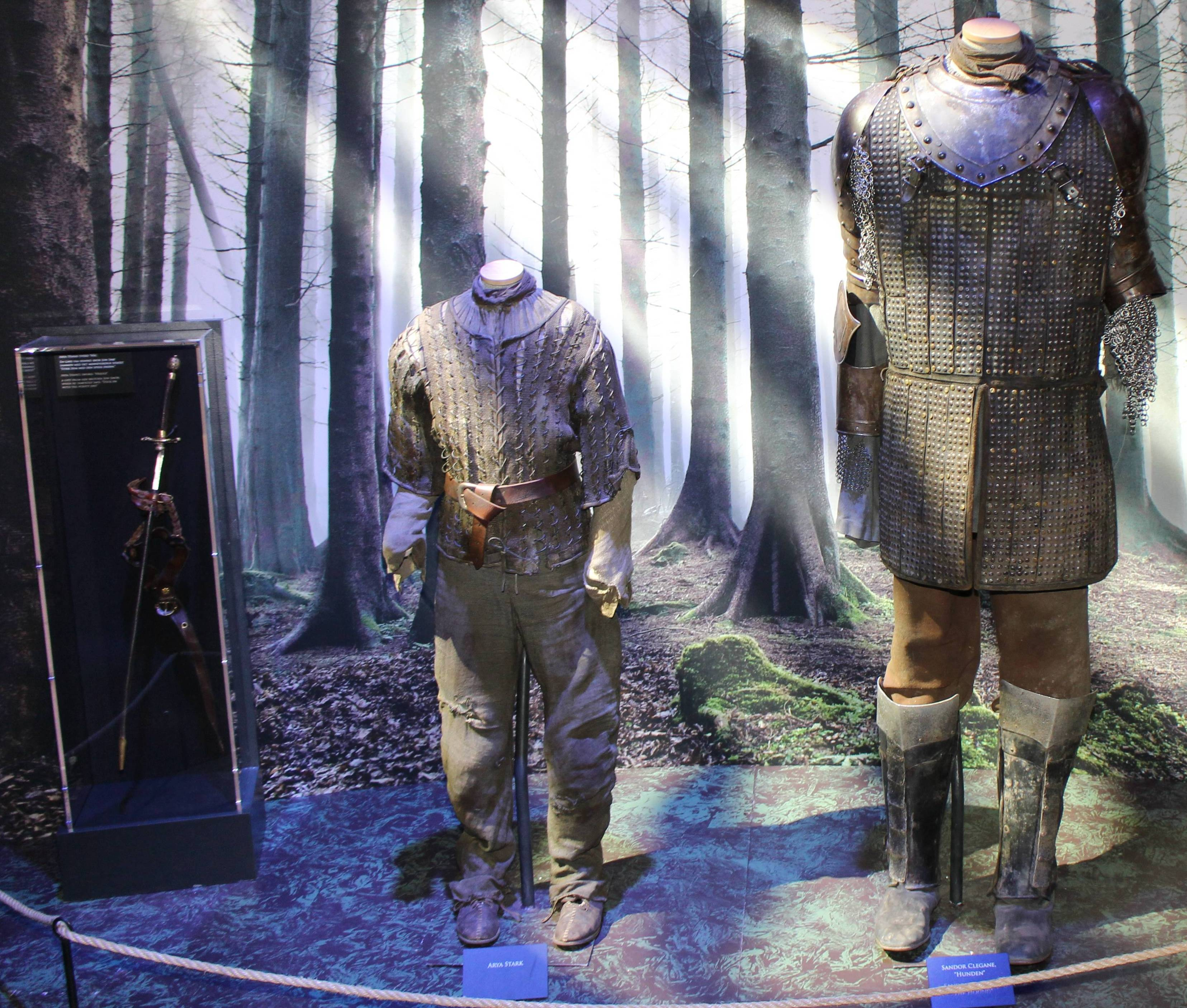
Left: Arya's smallsword "Needle" as shown in the TV series.
Right: The costumes worn by Arya and her companion Sandor Clegane in the TV series Game of Thrones.

Arya Stark is portrayed by English actress Maisie Williams in the television adaptation of the book series; it was Williams's first acting role. Williams was chosen from among 300 actresses tested across England.

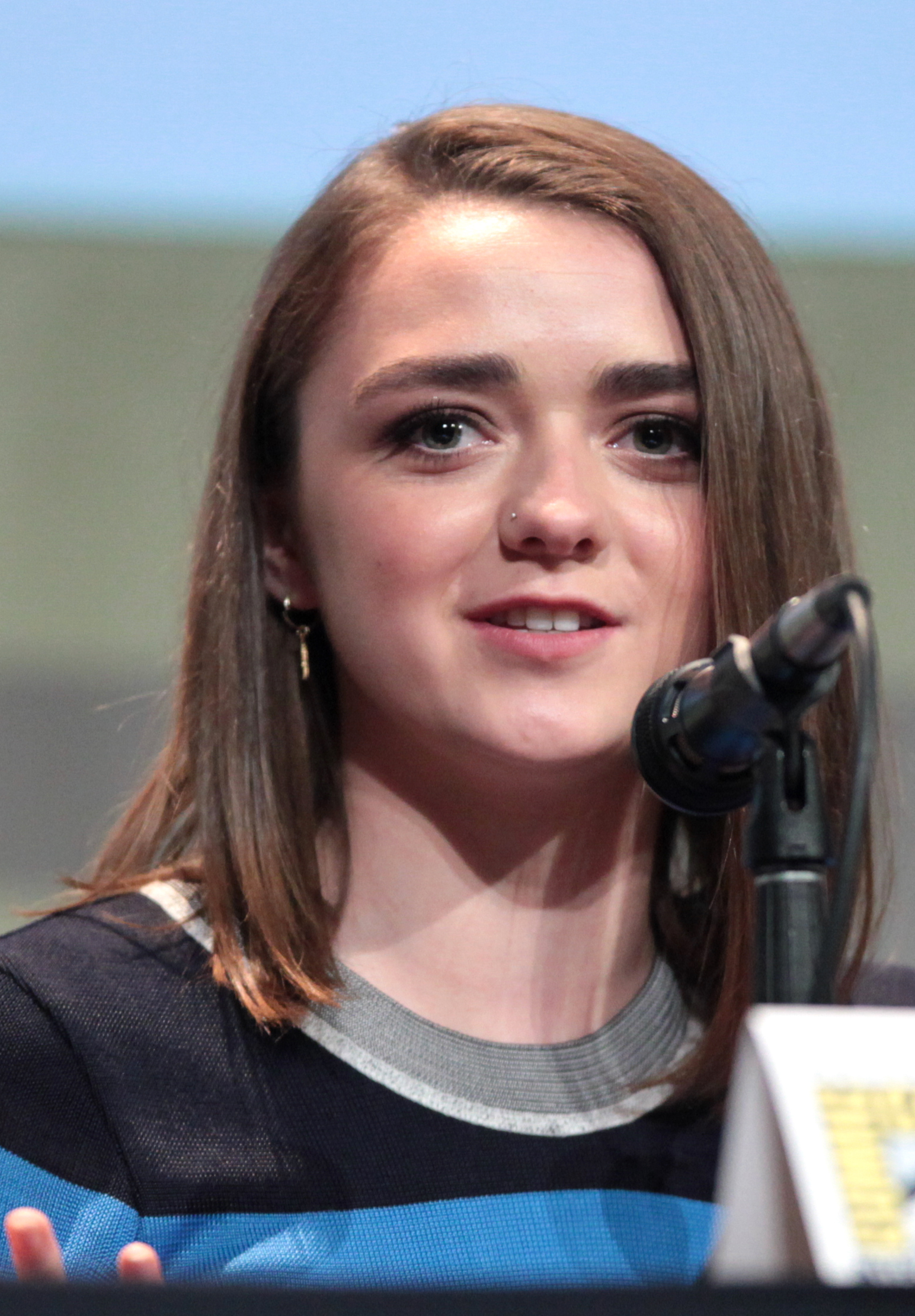
Maisie Williams plays the role of Arya Stark in the television series.

==== Season 1 ====
Arya accompanies her father, Ned Stark, and her sister, Sansa, to King's Landing. Before their departure, Arya's half-brother, Jon Snow, gifts Arya a sword, which she dubs "Needle". On the Kingsroad, Arya is sparring with a butcher's boy, Mycah, when Sansa's betrothed, Prince Joffrey Baratheon, attacks Mycah, prompting Arya's direwolf, Nymeria, to bite Joffrey. Arya shoos Nymeria away so she is not killed but is furious when Sansa later refuses to support her version of events. Mycah is later killed by Joffrey's bodyguard, Sandor "the Hound" Clegane, earning him Arya's hatred. Ned arranges for Arya to have sword lessons with the Braavosi Syrio Forel, who later defends her from Ser Meryn Trant when Joffrey ascends the Iron Throne—after his father is slain while hunting—and kills the Stark household. Arya flees the Red Keep, accidentally killing a stable boy in her escape, and hides out as a beggar in the streets of King's Landing. Ned is eventually taken to the Great Sept of Baelor to face 'judgment'; he spots Arya in the crowd and alerts the Night's Watch recruiter Yoren to her presence. Yoren prevents Arya from witnessing Ned's execution and has her pose as a boy, "Arry", to avoid detection as she joins Yoren's recruits traveling north to Castle Black.

==== Season 2 ====
House Lannister soldiers under Ser Amory Lorch, ordered by Cersei Lannister to kill Robert Baratheon's bastard, Gendry, attack the North-bound party. Needle is confiscated by a soldier named Polliver, who uses it to kill Arya's friend Lommy Greenhands (who Arya later claims is Gendry). The recruits are taken to Harrenhal, where Tywin Lannister recognises that Arya is a girl instead of a boy and takes her as his cupbearer. Jaqen offers to kill three people for Arya as a reward for saving his life and those of his cellmates during the attack; Arya picks Harrenhal's torturer, "the Tickler", and Ser Amory. When Arya is unable to have Tywin killed before his departure, she has Jaqen help her, Gendry, and her friend Hot Pie escape. Jaqen offers to take Arya to Braavos to join the Faceless Men assassin guild, and though she declines, he gives her an iron coin that will allow her to obtain passage there.

==== Season 3 ====
Arya, Gendry, and Hot Pie encounter Thoros of Myr, a priest of R'hllor who is a member of the Brotherhood Without Banners, a group of men sent by Ned to restore order in the Riverlands. As Thoros takes them to the Brotherhood's hideout, they encounter the Hound, who is a captive of other Brotherhood men. The Hound is brought before the Brotherhood's leader, Ser Beric Dondarrion; after Arya accuses him of Mycah's murder, Beric sentences him to trial by combat. The Hound wins—to Arya's fury—and is released by Dondarrion. Arya is further enraged when the Brotherhood sells Gendry to Melisandre. She escapes the Brotherhood soon afterward, only to be captured by the Hound, who intends to take her to the Twins to ransom her to her brother Robb Stark. However, as they arrive, House Frey betrays the Starks and slaughter their forces, with Arya barely escaping the massacre. In the aftermath of their escape, Arya encounters a Frey soldier bragging about his role in desecrating Robb's corpse. Arya stabs the soldier to death, marking the first time she has deliberately killed another person.

==== Season 4 ====
Arya and the Hound encounter Polliver in a tavern; Arya reclaims Needle and uses it to kill Polliver to avenge Lommy. They also encounter Rorge and Biter, Jaqen's fellow prisoners, and Arya kills Rorge after recalling he had threatened to rape her. The Hound takes Arya to the Vale to ransom her to her aunt Lysa Arryn, only to be turned away at the Bloody Gate when they are informed that Lysa has apparently committed suicide. Returning from the Bloody Gate, they are approached by Brienne of Tarth, who had sworn to Catelyn Stark to take Arya to safety. Distrusting Brienne's allegiances, the Hound attempts to kill her, but Brienne defeats the Hound, leaving him seemingly mortally wounded. Arya manages to hide from Brienne in the confusion, and after Brienne leaves, Arya takes the Hound's silver, leaving him to die. She then encounters a Braavosi captain, who offers her passage to Braavos after she gives him the iron coin.

==== Season 5 ====
Arya arrives in Braavos and is accepted into the House of Black and White by a man who 'wears' Jaqen H'ghar's face. He begins to train her. After impressing Jaqen with her ability to lie undetected by convincing a terminally ill girl to drink poison, Arya is given the assignment of assassinating a corrupt insurance salesperson. However, she is distracted from her mission by the arrival in Braavos of Ser Meryn Trant. Assuming the identity of the girl she had poisoned, Arya disguises herself as a prostitute and infiltrates a brothel, where she kills Meryn. However, when she returns to the House of Black and White, she is caught by Jaqen, who chides Arya for not dissociating from her identity and, as a result, for wearing another person's face, which will poison her. Arya is subsequently struck blind.

==== Season 6 ====
A blind Arya is forced to beg on the streets of Braavos. Her fellow acolyte, "the Waif", arrives daily to attack her. Eventually, Jaqen brings Arya back to the House of Black and White and restores her vision. She is tasked with assassinating an actress named Lady Crane, but seeing that Lady Crane is a decent person, Arya has a change of heart at the last minute and warns her of the attempt on her life. The Waif witnesses this disobedience and is permitted by Jaqen to kill Arya. Aware that she is now in danger, Arya retrieves her sword, Needle, from its hiding place. She arranges for passage out of Braavos but is stabbed by the Waif and barely escapes. Lady Crane nurses Arya back to health, but the Waif reappears, kills Lady Crane, and pursues a recovering Arya. Arya leads the Waif to her quarters beneath Braavos and extinguishes the candle in the room, using her experience fighting blind to gain the upper hand and kill the Waif. Arya removes the Waif's face and adds it to the Hall of Faces before telling an impressed Jaqen that she is Arya Stark, and returns to Westeros.

Arya travels to the Twins, assuming the identity of a servant girl. She kills two of Lord Walder Frey's sons, Black Walder Rivers and Lothar Frey, before cooking them in a pie that she serves to their father. After revealing her subterfuge and her true identity to Walder, she cuts his throat, avenging her brother Robb, her mother Catelyn, and the Northern army murdered at the Red Wedding.

==== Season 7 ====
Taking the face of Walder Frey, Arya gathers the men of House Frey for a feast before killing them all with poisoned wine. Arya then journeys south, intending to travel to King's Landing to assassinate Cersei—now Queen of the Seven Kingdoms following the extinction of House Baratheon. However, Arya changes her mind after learning from Hot Pie that Jon has ousted House Bolton from Winterfell and has been crowned King in the North, instead deciding to return to her ancestral home. Along the way, she encounters a wolf pack led by her long-lost direwolf, Nymeria. Nymeria recognizes Arya, but she has grown feral and turns away when Arya asks her to return North with her.

Arriving at Winterfell, Arya finds that Jon has traveled to Dragonstone but is reunited with Sansa and Bran. Bran reveals his knowledge of Arya's kill list through green-sight and presents her with a Valyrian steel dagger that Littlefinger had given him. Arya is also reunited with Brienne, who continues to serve the Starks, and manages to equal the female warrior during sparring despite her smaller size.

Littlefinger seeks to increase his influence on Sansa by driving a wedge between the Stark sisters. To this end, he allows Arya to witness him receiving a confidential message obtained from Maester Luwin's records. Arya breaks into Littlefinger's quarters to steal the message: a plea sent by Sansa following Ned's imprisonment to Robb imploring him to bend the knee to Joffrey. Outraged, Arya confronts Sansa and is unconvinced by her explanation that she wrote the message to try to save Ned's life. Later, Arya catches Sansa looking at her collection of faces and threatens Sansa before leaving.

Some time later, Sansa summons Arya to the great hall and begins an accusation of treason and murder. However, the accusation is directed towards Littlefinger, whose crimes have been discovered by Bran's greenseeing. Despite Littlefinger's pleas for mercy, Sansa sentences him to death, and Arya cuts his throat with the Valyrian steel dagger, thus avenging her family and securing justice. The Stark sisters later resolve their differences and acknowledge that the Starks must stay together to survive winter.

==== Season 8 ====
Arya reunites with Jon, Gendry, and the Hound, who have all journeyed to Winterfell with Daenerys Targaryen's forces to make a stand against the approaching White Walkers. Arya asks Gendry, who is forging dragonglass into weapons, to make her a special dragonglass staff. When Gendry gives it to Arya, he tells her he is the bastard son of Robert Baratheon. Aware of their chances of dying in the upcoming battle and Arya wanting to experience sex, Arya and Gendry sleep together. Later that night, Arya hears the signal alerting her that the White Walkers' army has arrived.

Arya fights in the battle against the dead with the Hound and Beric Dondarrion. Beric sacrifices himself to allow Arya and the Hound to escape the wights. A battered Arya sprints through the corridors of Winterfell and encounters Melisandre, who suggests to Arya that she is meant to kill the Night King. In the Godswood, just as the Night King is about to kill Bran, Arya sneaks up and stabs the Night King with the Valyrian steel dagger Bran gave her. Upon killing the Night King, the White Walkers and wights are all destroyed.

In the aftermath of the battle, Gendry is legitimised as a Baratheon by Daenerys and proposes to Arya. Arya declines, as she does not want the life of a lady. Sansa and Arya tell Jon they do not trust Daenerys, but Jon defends her. Arya learns that Jon is the son of her aunt Lyanna Stark and Rhaegar Targaryen after Jon swears her and Sansa to secrecy about his true parentage.

Arya journeys south to King's Landing with the Hound to kill Cersei. The two infiltrate the Red Keep with the civilians Cersei is using to deter Daenerys's attack. Despite the city's surrender, Daenerys lays waste to the populace atop Drogon. The Hound seeks out his brother, "the Mountain", in his quest for revenge against him, but he urges Arya to leave and give up her own quest for revenge to avoid a life consumed by it. Arya sincerely thanks the Hound, calling him by his name, Sandor. She tries to save the smallfolk as Daenerys burns the city, but her attempts fail. Arya narrowly survives the attack. In the aftermath, Arya is reunited with Jon. She warns him that he and the Starks are not safe from Daenerys; Tyrion Lannister agrees that Daenerys is now the people's biggest threat. Jon tries but is unable to dissuade Daenerys from further destruction and ultimately assassinates her. He is imprisoned. Weeks later, Arya joins the other lords and ladies of Westeros in a council to decide who shall lead the Seven Kingdoms. Bran is chosen as king, though Arya abstains from voting, as Sansa declares the North's independence. Arya, Sansa, and Bran bid Jon farewell as he is exiled to the Wall.

Arya reveals that she is leaving Westeros to see what lies west of the continent. She embarks on her voyage aboard a Stark ship and reflects on her family.

=== Anti-heroine ===
Arya can be regarded as an antiheroine, Sophie Heawood of The Guardian described Arya's eight season character arc as a journey "from cute little sister to ruthless serial killer (of 64 victims)", and said that Arya was "the serial killer everyone's rooting for." A young character who witnesses both the unjust execution of her father and the immediate aftermath of her mother and brother's murder (including the parading of the latter's desecrated corpse). Arya works her way through a revenge death list of names of those responsible for killing all the people she cared about. After six seasons of battling alone she reunites with her family as a weapons expert and trained assassin. When the expected heroes and armies of the living appear defeated, Arya Stark is the hero that saves the entire fictional continent of Westeros by using her prowess as an assassin to kill the Night King (the "god of death") which causes the simultaneous eradication of his vast undead army. Arya killing the Night King was nominated for the 2020 BAFTA TV Awards under the "Must-See Moment" category.

== Popularity and cultural impact ==
The personal forename Arya is an existing real-world name for both sexes of Sanskrit (Sanskrit: आर्य, romanized: ārya, lit. 'noble' or 'honorable') and Persian (Persian: آریا, romanized: ārya, lit. 'noble,' or 'faithful') origins long used in South Asia. Following the start of the TV series, in 2012, the name Arya became the fastest-rising baby girl's name in the U.S., jumping in popularity from 711th to the 413th position, largely due to the popularity of Williams's character "Arya Stark". The name maintained its popularity in 2019. It was ranked 92 in the U.S., and its variation Aria was listed at 20. The name also entered the top 200 most-commonly used names for baby girls born in England and Wales in 2017.

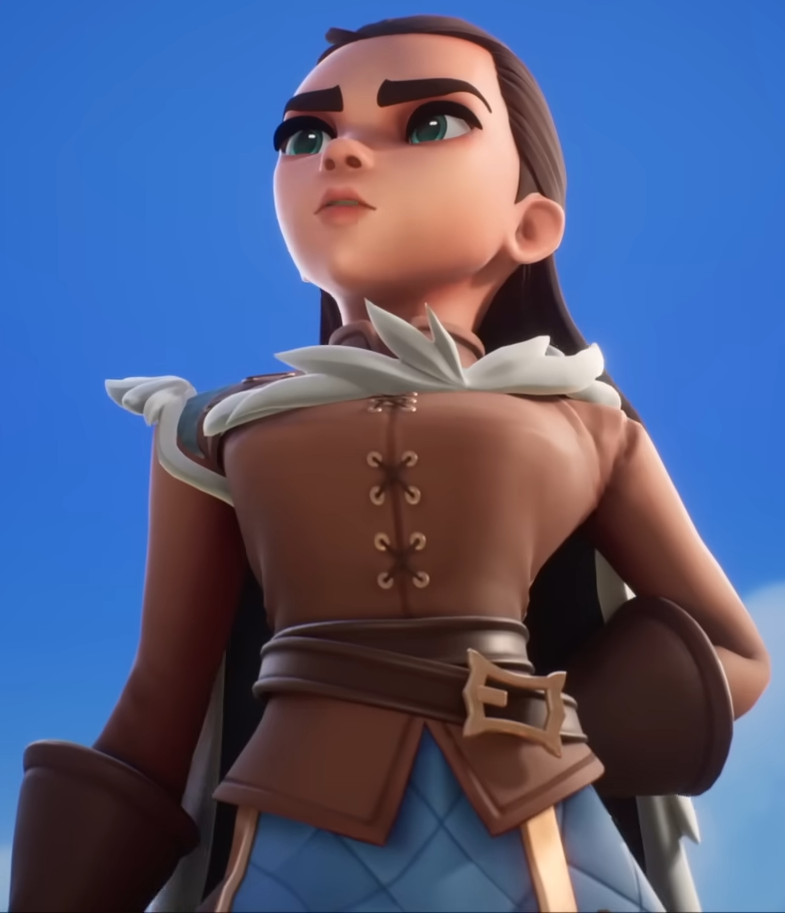
Arya Stark in MultiVersus

The 2017 international hit "Look What You Made Me Do" by American singer-songwriter Taylor Swift was partially inspired by Williams's Arya, with the line "I've got a list of names and yours is in red, underlined" inspired by her kill list; Canadian rapper Drake thanked Arya Stark for killing the Night King during his acceptance speech at the 2019 Billboard Music Awards. Williams was also one of ten actors from Game of Thrones featured in character in a collection of Royal Mail first-class postage stamps. The set, which celebrates British contributions to the show, was released by the UK Post Office in January 2018.

Arya Stark appears as a playable character in the 2024 platform fighting game MultiVersus, with Maisie Williams vocally reprising her role.
