= Khalissi =

Khalissi may refer to:

- Sheikh Mehdi Al-Khalissi (1868–1925; Mohammad Khalissi Zadeh; محمد خالصی‌زاده;), Iraqi Shiite religious leader
- Khaleesi, Game of Thrones fictional title carried by the A Song of Ice and Fire fictional character Daenerys Targaryen

== See also ==
- Khaleesi (disambiguation)
- Calici (disambiguation)
