= Chinita Ullmann =

Brazilian dancer

- Born: Frieda Ullmann; March 14, 1904; Porto Alegre
- Died: May 30, 1977 (aged 73); São Paulo
- Other names: Chinita Ullman

Chinita Ullmann (March 14, 1904 – May 30, 1977), sometimes seen as Chinita Ullman, was a Brazilian dancer, born Frieda Ullmann. "Modern dance was largely introduced to Brazil by Chinita Ullman," notes The Oxford Dictionary of Dance.

== Early life ==
Frieda Ullmann was born in Porto Alegre, Brazil, the daughter of Emil Paul Friedrich Ullmann and Wanda Wilhelmine Heuser Ullmann. Her father was an immigrant to Brazil from Breslau, Silesia; her maternal grandparents were also German-speaking immigrants to Brazil. Frieda Ullmann took an interest in modern dance, and went to Dresden to study with Mary Wigman.

== Career ==
Ullmann was a member of Wigman's company from 1925 to 1927. She left the company to perform and tour as a solo artist, using the name "Chinita Ullmann". She also wrote about dance, and taught modern dance; among her students were German dancer Lotte Berk and her husband, composer Ernst Berk.

Ullmann returned to Brazil in 1932, and was a founder of the Sociedade Pró-Arte Moderna (SPAM), and promoted the Laban method of dance education and dance notation. She opened a dance school in São Paulo with Kitty Bodenheim. After World War II she taught at the Escola de Arte Dramática. She retired from performing after 1954.

== Personal life ==
Ullmann died in 1977, aged 73 years, in São Paulo, Brazil. The Prémio Chinita Ullmann is named for her.
