= Dailey method =

Barre class created by Jill D. McIntosh

The Dailey Method is a barre class created by Jill Dailey McIntosh in 2000. The Dailey Method currently has studios operating in Arizona, California, Colorado, Illinois, Indiana, Michigan, Missouri, Nevada, Washington, Canada and Paris, France. It operates on the fundamental principles of alignment, balance, and results. Each one-hour class incorporates ballet barre work, core conditioning, muscle strengthening, yoga and orthopedic exercise through small, repeated movements. The Dailey Method aims to create optimal spinal alignment and a mind-body connection in its students. The first location was opened in San Francisco's Marina District in 2000.
