= Pop Physique =

Fitness franchise

Pop Physique is an international barre fitness franchise founded by Jennifer and Deric Williams in 2008. The franchise was founded in Los Angeles, but eventually expanded to other major American cities such as San Francisco and New York, and to Canada.

== History ==
Pop Physique was founded in Silver Lake in 2008 by Jennifer Williams, a former ballerina with her husband Deric. Williams had previously taught pilates before starting Pop Physique with her husband who was a brand developer. The franchise specializes in high-intensity, dance based workouts. Jennifer Williams stated that its fitness regimen was inspired by ballet techniques, and it was compared to the "Lotte Berk" method of dance-based workouts. Pop Physique subsequently opened locations in San Francisco, and announced plans for its first New York City location in September 2015, with plans to operate 22 locations by the end of the year. By 2016, the franchise had over 19 locations in major metropolitan areas of states like California, New York, Maryland, and Florida. It later expanded to Canada under the name "Pop Physique Toronto", opening their first Canadian location in 2017 at Yonge and St. Clair in Deer Park, Toronto.

== Image and branding ==
The franchise attempted to define itself from similar franchises which offered "barre" classes by cultivating a "sexy" and modern atmosphere, and its first ad campaign paid homage to the 1973 exercise book Awake! Aware! Alive! by Lydia Bach. In 2015, roughly 97% of its clientele were women, with most being between the age of 25 and 45. Harper's Bazaar described the ambiance as a "cheeky '80s Day-Glo aesthetic, thanks to neon signs and fishnet wallpaper". Pop Physique opened locations in traditionally bohemian neighbourhoods or major urban cities. The studios played popular music from genres such as indie, pop, hip hop, and EDM, and unlike many dance fitness centres, it did not censor explicit songs.

Pop Physique's marketing campaign focused on cultivating a strong social media presence, as well as word-of-mouth and billboard advertisement. Instagram was particularly important to its brand identity and marketing strategy, and the studios included branded "Pop your selfie" mirrors. The franchise's advertisement used suggestive slogans such as "Nice Butt", and its merchandise similarly capitalized on the brand's sex appeal with slogans such as "Barre whore". Pop Physique was the first barre studio franchise to launch its own line of branded activewear. The franchise later sought to replace its video service with online subscription streaming service.

The franchise received considerable media attention for its celebrity clientele and its association with athleisure and hipster subculture, and was featured by publications such as Harper's Bazaar, People, Huffington Post, and the Los Angeles Times.

== Controversies and location closures ==
On November 30, 2018 Pop Physique was sued by the landlord of its studio in Russian Hill, San Francisco, who alleged that the owners had failed to pay the rent for the studio location they were leasing from him. The lawsuit claimed over $400,000 in debt, and additional payment for damages. The franchise began closing many of its locations in December 2018, often with no prior announcement. By May 2019, only four locations remained open. In April 2019, the franchise shut down its Toronto location.

Following the abrupt and unannounced closure of several locations across the United States, the company received complaints from customers who had already purchased packages for future classes, and were unable to get refunds. Jennifer Williams blamed the closures on unexpected lawsuits and legal entanglements. On May 2, 2018 BuzzFeed reported that Pop Physique had even sold packages to customers at specific locations the day after they had officially closed. Williams stated that she no longer owned any of the remaining locations, but that fitness studio franchisees in former Pop Physique locations had agreed to honor customer's Pop Physique coupons and promotional deals.

== Notable alumni ==
Several notable celebrities endorsed Pop Physique, such as Brie Larson, Haim, Diane Kruger, Mindy Kaling, Selena Gomez, Kathryn Hahn, and Vanessa Hudgens. American actress Stephanie Beatriz is a former instructor there. Former desk staff alumni include Sosie Bacon
