= Ernest Berk =

German dancer, choreographer and composer (1909–1993)

- Born: 12 October 1909; Cologne, Germany
- Died: 30 September 1993 (aged 83)
- Occupations: Dancer, choreographer and composer
- Spouse(s): Lotte Berk (m. 1933) (div.); Ailsa Park (m. 1965)

Ernest Berk (12 October 1909 – 30 September 1993) was a dancer, modern dance choreographer and composer of electronic music. He left Nazi Germany in 1934 to live and work for most of his career in the UK, returning to Berlin in the 1980s.

== Early life and education ==
Born in Koln, Germany, Berk received his musical education from the Rheinische Musikschule, and was taught dance by Mary Wigman and the Brazilian dancer Chinita Ullmann. While in Germany, he ran his own dance company and produced a ballet for Max Reinhardt at the Salzburg Festival. Escaping Nazi Germany with his wife Lotte and baby daughter after they were banned from performing, he settled in the UK in 1934.

== Dancer and choreographer ==
From 1935, Berk produced ballets for the Glyndebourne Festivals, for Covent Garden and for the West End theatre. During this period he founded the Modern Dance Group in London and produced Buddha the Enlightened, a ballet commissioned by the poet John Masefield. With composer (and fellow émigré) Peter Ury Berk collaborated on several ballets, including The Family Suite (1949). Sakuntala, a ballet in Indian style, was staged at the Adelphi Theatre in April 1946, set to classical Indian music chosen by V. K. Narayana Menon.

In 1947, Berk was choreographer for the Edinburgh International Festival, its first year. With Nesta Brooking (1906–2006, owner of the Brooking School of Dance), he created the Dance Theatre company, whose ballet Trilustrum (1947) combined elements of the ballet with modern dance and won a special award at the Choreographic Competition in Copenhagen.

== Composer ==
He became interested in electronic music, producing musique concrète from a home studio he established in Camden in 1955. His first piece for magnetic tape was End of the World (1957), one of the first electronic works composed in England. His music was often used to accompany his own expressionist dance works, but he soon also began producing electronic soundtracks for theatre, television (such as the 1963 BBC drama A Little Bit Of Gold Said "Jump") and film.

In 1968, his work was presented at two pioneering London electronic music concerts – at the Queen Elizabeth Hall on 15 January 1968, and later at the Planetarium – alongside the music of other early electronic music contemporaries in the UK, such as Peter Zinovieff, Brian Dennis, Hugh Davies, Delia Derbyshire, Tristram Cary, Daphne Oram and George Newson. In 1970, he established a new studio at 52 Dorset Street, London W1.

More than 200 electronic pieces emerged between 1957 and 1984. Two ballet soundtracks (Initiation and Gemini) were issued on a private record in 1970 and later commercially released by Trunk Records in 2019. Huddersfield Contemporary Records issued a double CD of his music, Diversed Tapes, in 2024.

== Influences ==
As well as dancing and choreography, Berk was skilled as a mime artist and percussionist. His choreography was influenced by the Dresden expressionist school, and the subject matter of his ballets were shaped by his left-wing politics. His music shows his awareness of the folk traditions of India and China. Berk amassed a large collection of folk percussion instruments from those continents. There were collaborations with other experimental artists, such as pianist John Tilbury, composer Basil Kirchin, visual artist John Latham, and filmmaker David Gladwell.

== Later life and return to Germany ==
In 1933, Berk married the dancer Liselotte Heymansohn (Lotte Berk), with whom he often collaborated, and there was a daughter, Esther. They separated in the 1960s, and Lotte Berk went on to develop methods of exercise that attracted celebrity interest from Britt Ekland, Barbra Streisand and Joan Collins. In 1965, Berk married a second time, this time to another dancer, Ailsa Park, nearly 40 years his junior. Together they formed the Dance Theatre Commune in 1970, and taught at the Guildhall School of Music and Drama and at the Stanhope Institute for adult education.

Returning to Germany in the mid-1980s, Berk taught music therapy and improvisation in Berlin at Hochschule der Künste. Much of his archive – gifted to the Historisches Archiv der Stadt Köln – was destroyed in 2009 after a building collapse.

== See also ==
- Modern dance
- Expressionist dance
