= Daenerys (given name) =

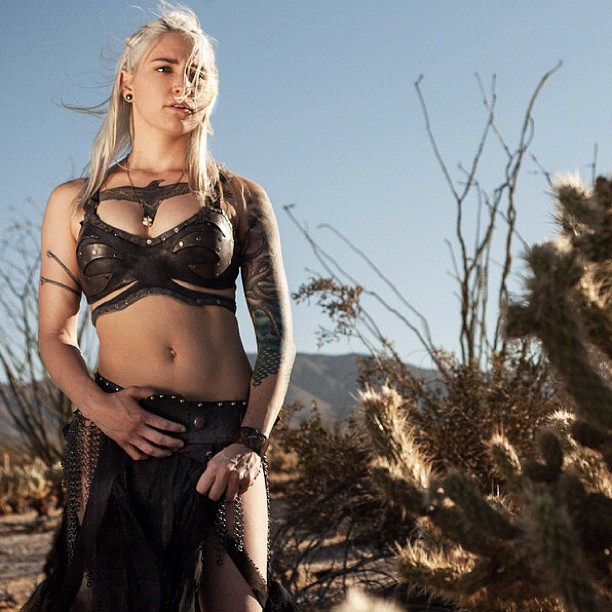
- Cosplayer as Daenerys Targaryen
- Gender: female

Origin
- Meaning: created, literary name

Other names
- Nickname: Dany
- Related names: Khaleesi

Daenerys is a feminine given name usually used in reference to the A Song of Ice and Fire and Game of Thrones character Daenerys Targaryen, created by American author George R. R. Martin. Parents who used the name said they were inspired by the strength and beauty of the character and her actions in liberating slaves and assuming power in her own right. The character on the 2010s television series took a darker turn, which prompted discussion about whether parents would regret having used the name. The name declined in popularity after the end of the series but remains in regular use.
