= Khaleesi (given name) =

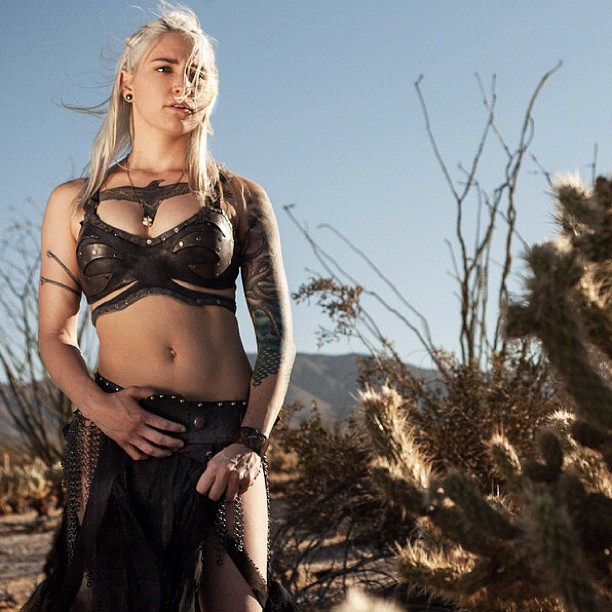
- Daenerys Targaryen cosplayer, 2012
- Pronunciation: /kəˈliːsiː/ or /ˈxa.le.e.si/
- Gender: female

Origin
- Origin: Created literary name from constructed language Dothraki
- Meaning: queen

Other names
- Related names: Caleesi, Daenerys, Kaleesi, Khaleesie, Khalesi, Khalessi

Khaleesi is a feminine given name derived from the Dothraki title meaning queen that was used for the fictional character Daenerys Targaryen in American author George R.R. Martin's A Song of Ice and Fire books and in Game of Thrones, the television series based upon the novels.

The intended pronunciation of the word from the constructed language used in Game of Thrones varied from the pronunciation originally intended by conlanger David J. Peterson. The proper pronunciation of the word in Dothraki is /ˈxa.le.e.si/ (KHAH-lay-ay-see), while the pronunciation used in the television series was /kəˈliːsiː/ (kə-LEE-see).

Parents who chose the name for their daughters said they were attracted by the strength and beauty of the character, who liberated slaves and overcame obstacles to assume power in her own right. The dark turn taken by the character and her ultimate fate on Game of Thrones prompted discussion about whether parents would regret using the name for their daughters.

== Usage ==
The name Khaleesi remains in regular use and, as of 2025, had been among the thousand most popular names in use for girls in the United States since 2014. It is also in use in other countries. Daenerys, the name of the character, declined in popularity after the end of the series but also remains in regular use. There were 108 newborn American girls who were given the name in 2021. Another 123 newborn American girls were given the name in 2022, another 125 in 2023, and another 136 in 2024 and another 115 in 2025. Khaleesi has also been a popular name for pets, along with other Game of Thrones character names. A dog named Khaleesi Sherbrooke was elected mayor of Cormorant, Minnesota in 2024, a story which attracted national media attention. A female wolf pup with edited genes based on an extinct dire wolf was born in the United States in February 2025 and was named Khaleesi in reference to the fictional Game of Thrones, which features dire wolves.

In August 2024 the United Kingdom passport office declined to issue a six-year-old British girl a passport on the grounds that the child's given name Khaleesi was under Warner Bros. trademark. After the story was reported in the media and it was determined that a name given to a child at birth cannot be trademarked, with the family's solicitors also arguing that trademarks are for goods and services not for personal names, the decision was reversed.

== Individuals with the name ==
=== Characters ===
- Daenerys Targaryen, a character from A Song of Ice and Fire by George R.R. Martin, featured on the TV show adaptation Game of Thrones who holds the title of Khaleesi
- Khaleesi, a character from the 2018 film Tamizh Padam 2

=== Animals ===
- Khaleesi (wolf) (born 2025), a female genetically modified grey wolf with dire wolf characteristics represented, created by Colossal Biosciences
- Khaleesi Sherbrooke, a Great Pyrenees dog, ceremonial mayor of Cormorant Township, Becker County, Minnesota, USA; see List of animals in political office
- My Khaleesi, a racehorse, winner of the 2016 Karndean Designflooring Mares' Open National Hunt Flat Race
- Khaleesi (died 2017), a great white shark killed by Port and Starboard (orcas)

== See also ==
- Khaleesi (disambiguation)
