= Colossal Biosciences dire wolf project =

Bioengineering project with the goal of replicating an extinct species

The Colossal Biosciences dire wolf project is a project by Colossal Biosciences with the goal of replicating the phenotype of the extinct dire wolf (Aenocyon dirus) by genetic engineering. As of 2025, they had produced three genetically modified gray wolves (Canis lupus) that survived beyond infancy, named Romulus, Remus, and Khaleesi.

The project has received criticism from independent experts for the animals being referred to as dire wolves, as Romulus, Remus, and Khaleesi cannot be equated to the original species.

== Overview ==
Romulus, Remus, and Khaleesi
- Species: Genetically modified gray wolves (Canis lupus)
- Sex: Romulus and Remus: Male; Khaleesi: Female
- Born: Romulus and Remus: October 1, 2024; Khaleesi: January 30, 2025
- Known for: Purportedly being the first de-extincted dire wolves (Aenocyon dirus)
- Named after: Romulus and Remus; Daenerys Targaryen (Khaleesi)
- https://colossal.com/direwolf/

Romulus, Remus, and Khaleesi are three genetically modified gray wolves, intended to mimic the extinct dire wolf. The first two, both being males, are named after Romulus and Remus of Roman myth, and the latter, a female, is named after the literary character Daenerys Targaryen from George R. R. Martin's book series A Song of Ice and Fire, who may be referred to by the honorific Khaleesi.

Romulus and Remus were born on October 1, 2024; Colossal claims that the two males represent the first living examples of the species since its extinction approximately 10,000 years ago. Khaleesi, a female, was born later, on January 30, 2025. Due to significant genetic differences from Aenocyon, the dire wolf genus, Romulus, Remus, and Khaleesi are in fact genetically-engineered gray wolves.

Scientists rewrote 14 key genes in gray wolf Endothelial progenitor cells (EPCs) so that the produced animals express 20 traits said to be characteristic of dire wolves; "no ancient dire wolf DNA was actually spliced into the grey wolf's genome." The public announcement of their birth in April 2025 was subject to significant public attention. Later in May 2025, the company's chief scientist Beth Shapiro stated that the three animals are merely "grey wolves with 20 edits" as purportedly stated by the company "from the very beginning", acknowledging that it is impossible to bring back an extinct organism, or at least an organism "identical to a species that used to be alive". She admitted that the term "dire wolves" applied to the pups are a colloquialism, not scientific terminology. This is a "major departure from what Colossal had said previously".

== Genesis ==
The creation of these modified gray wolves involved analyzing ancient DNA samples from two sources: a 13,000-year-old tooth discovered at Sheriden Cave (an Ice Age archaeological site in Wyandot County, northwestern Ohio) and a 72,000-year-old ear bone found in American Falls, Idaho. Colossal Biosciences's scientists stated that rather than directly inserting ancient DNA into modern animals, they had identified approximately twenty genetic modifications across fourteen genes that differentiate dire wolves from modern gray wolves.

The scientific team isolated endothelial progenitor cells (EPCs) from gray wolf blood samples, then used CRISPR gene editing to produce several traits which the company claims are found in dire wolves, including a larger body size, wider head, and pale coat color. Only 15 of the 20 DNA changes are directly based on dire wolf genome and the remaining 5 changes are known to produce light coat color. The light coat color was created by inducing loss-of-function in the genes MC1R and MFSD12. These modified nuclei were transferred into denucleated ova, which developed into embryos in laboratory conditions. From 45 engineered ova, four viable embryos were successfully implanted in surrogate mother dogs.

The surrogate mothers were selected domestic dog mixes chosen for their general health and size sufficient to accommodate the larger dire wolf pups. One particular surrogate mother, a domestic dog named Skyla, played a crucial role in the project. The pregnancies were continuously monitored with weekly ultrasounds, and all three births occurred via planned caesarean section to minimize complications. The mother dogs after the caesarean were cared by the surgical team, recovered, and reunited with the puppies.

== Traits ==
The wolves' genetic modifications resulted in several key physical differences from gray wolves, including a pale coloration of their coat and distinctive vocalizations, particularly bearing unique howling patterns. Morphologically, the wolves have a larger overall body size with a more "powerful" shoulder structure, wider head shape, larger teeth and jaws, and more muscular legs. Behaviorally, the wolves exhibited natural wolf tendencies from birth, including early howling (beginning at approximately two weeks of age), stalking and hunting behaviors, and a natural wariness around humans. Unlike domesticated canines, they maintain distance from people, including their handlers, and display characteristic wolf retreat behaviors when approached.

Based on unreviewed genetic research, Colossal claims that dire wolves would have had a pale coat coloration. The pups' white coat results from a coat coloration gene expressed in dogs, chosen as a replacement for the purported original gene, which carries "a risk of blindness and deafness."

By six months of age, the male wolves measured nearly 1.2 meters (4 ft) in length and weighed approximately 36.3 kilograms (80 lb) each. They are projected to reach 1.8 meters (6 ft) in length and 68 kilograms (150 lb) at full maturity.

Their "sister" Khaleesi was born on January 30, 2025. She was named in homage to the Game of Thrones character Daenerys Targaryen. The three wolves are maintained as a small pack.

== Husbandry ==
Romulus and Remus are housed in a secured 2,000-acre (810 ha) ecological preserve within the United States surrounded by 10-foot (3.0 m) fencing, at an undisclosed location to protect them from disturbance. The facility includes a smaller 6-acre (2.4 ha) area containing a veterinary clinic, extreme weather shelter, and natural dens. They receive around-the-clock veterinary supervision. Romulus and Remus were named after the legendary twin brothers who founded Rome, and in Roman mythology had been suckled by a she-wolf as infants. As pups, a picture was taken of them resting on the original Iron Throne prop from Game of Thrones, an allusion to their alleged species' presence in the franchise.

Their diet consists of deer, beef, and horse meat, supplemented with organ meats and specialized nutritional supplements. Initially fed pureed meat after weaning, they now receive whole portions that allow them to engage in natural tearing behaviors. The wolves have not been provided with live prey, though staff note they have not observed any interactions with small wildlife that may enter their enclosure.

== Reception ==
Independent experts disagreed with the Colossal Biosciences' claim that these animals are revived dire wolves. The zoologist Philip Seddon and the paleontologist Dr. Nic Rawlence from Otago University explained that the animals are genetically modified hybrid gray wolves. Rawlence noted that ancient dire wolf DNA is an extremely fragmentary source for constructing a biological clone and that dire wolves diverged from gray wolves anywhere between 2.5 and 6 million years ago. His criticism was likewise directed at the small number of genetic changes (20 in only 14 genes) Colossal administered to the gray wolf genome, suggesting a closer relation to the gray wolf genetically than the company's marketing often acknowledged, and had concerns that this project could give the wrong message in biodiversity conservation.

The geneticist Adam Boyko at Cornell University stated that the wolves are only functional versions of "dire wolves", instead of a resurrection of the legitimate species. Jeremy Austin, Director of the Australian Centre for Ancient DNA, stated that the result was "not a dire wolf under any definition of a species ever", disputing the phenotypic species definition used by Dr. Beth Shapiro, arguing that hundreds of thousands of genetic differences exist between dire and gray wolves. He also questioned whether the purported dire wolves have any ecological place left in the modern world or will merely become zoo animals. Similar criticisms would be expressed by wolf experts including L. David Mech and Luigi Boitani.

According to Time Magazine, the Mandan, Hidatsa, and Arikara Nation has expressed interest in Colossal Biosciences potentially releasing their modified wolves into a controlled area of the Fort Berthold Reservation in northwestern North Dakota, which currently spans 1,000,000 acres (400,000 ha). The wolves currently live in a 2,000-acre (810 ha) ecological preserve in an undisclosed location in the United States.

Author George R. R. Martin, the creator of A Song of Ice and Fire, was invited to see the wolves, and commented, "Maybe I was remembering a past life, when I ran with a pack in the Ice Age. … Whatever the reason, I have to say the rebirth of the direwolf has stirred me as no scientific news has since Neil Armstrong walked on the moon."

The IUCN Species Survival Commission's Canid Specialist Group officially declared that the three animals are neither dire wolves nor proxies of the dire wolves based on the IUCN SSC guiding principles on creating proxies of extinct species for conservation benefit. They commented that creating phenotypic proxies does not change the conservation status of an extinct species and may instead threaten the extant species such as gray wolves. Therefore, since the claimed proxies do not conform with the IUCN SSC guidelines, have no ecological niche left today and "will not restore ecosystem function", they concluded that the Colossal Biosciences' project "does not contribute to conservation." The Colossal Biosciences released Alignment of Colossal’s Dire Wolf De-Extinction Project with IUCN SSC Guiding Principles in response.

Technology magazine owned by the Massachusetts Institute of Technology, MIT Technology Review, placed the Colossal Biosciences dire wolf project on their list of the 8 worst technology flops of 2025, citing the IUCN's response that the project may detract from current conservation efforts.

== See also ==
- Tauros Programme
- De-extinction
- Woolly mouse – Another genetically modified animal from Colossal Biosciences
