= Physique =

Physique may refer to:

- The natural constitution, or physical structure, of a person (see Somatotype and constitutional psychology, Anthropometry, Body shape)
- In bodybuilding, the trained muscular structure of a person's body
- Physical fitness, a general state of health and well-being and, the ability to perform aspects of a sport or occupation
- Physical strength, the ability of an animal or human to exert force on physical objects using muscles
- Physical attractiveness, the degree to which a person's physical traits are considered aesthetically pleasing or beautiful
- Physique 57, New York City based fitness company
- Physique TV, Dubai based television channel dedicated to physical fitness

== See also ==
- Physical (disambiguation)
