= Barre (exercise) =

Form of physical exercise

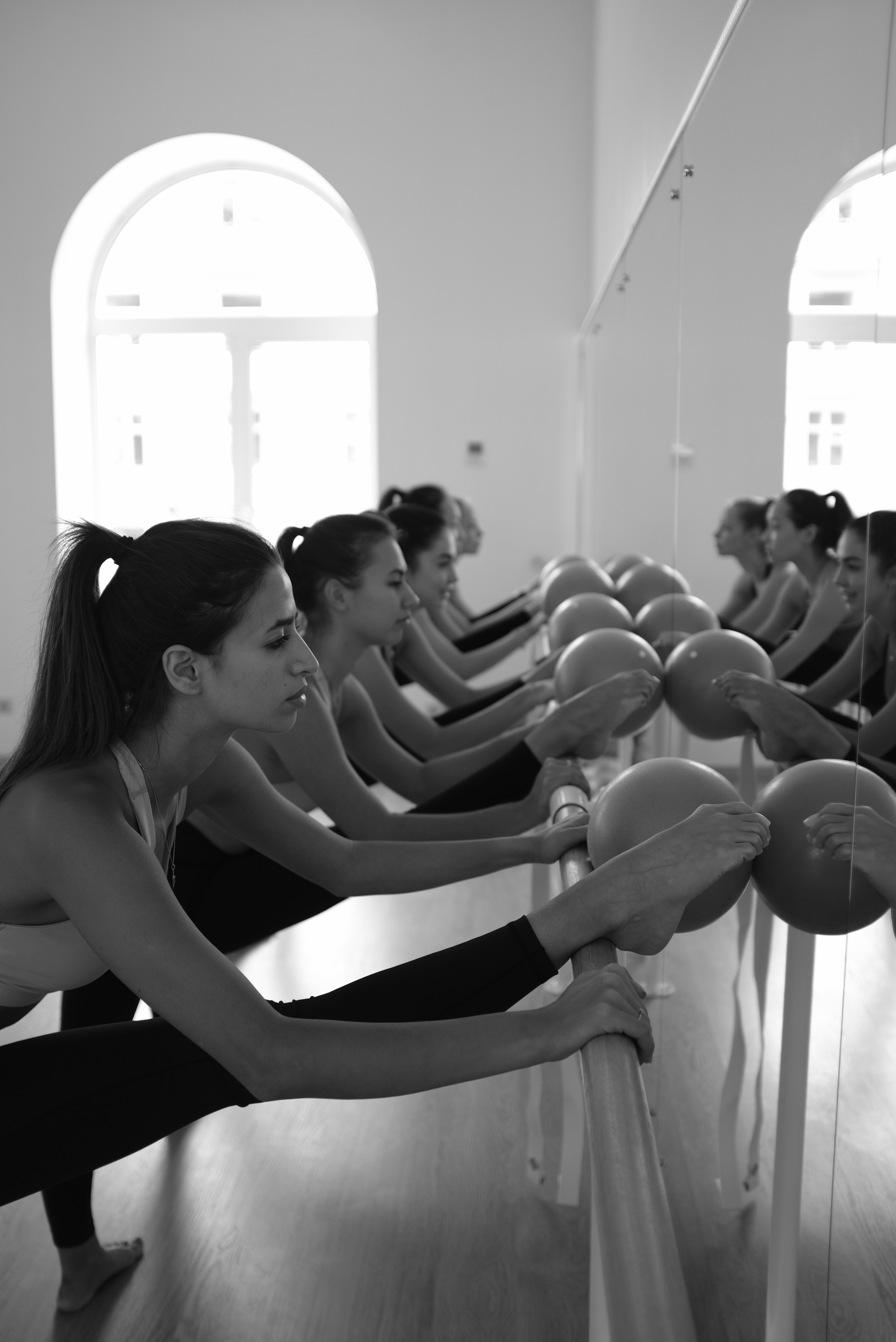
Barre at SM Stretching studios in Russia

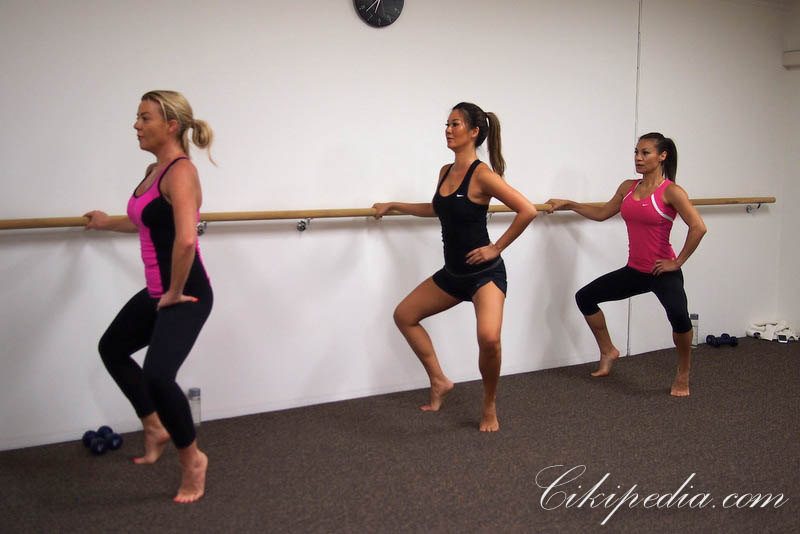
Three people doing barre exercises, performing pliés on relevé

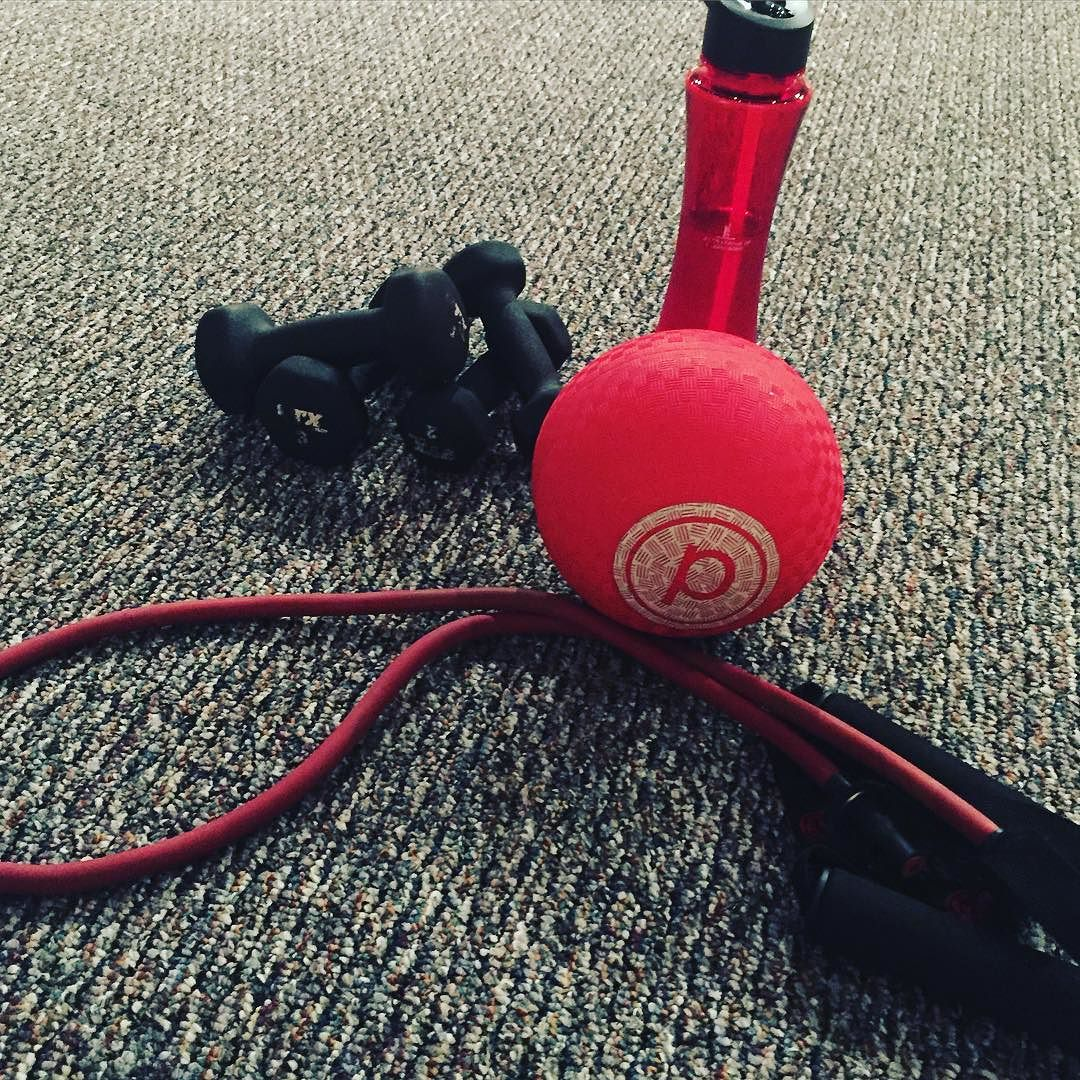
Some common equipment used in barre classes: a yoga strap, pilates soft ball, and hand weights.

Barre (UK: /bɑː/, US: /bɑːr/ bar) is a form of dance fitness, usually conducted in group classes in gyms and studios. It is distinguished from other forms of group fitness by its use of the ballet barre and its incorporation of movements derived from contemporary dance and ballet, as the innovator of Barre, Lotte Berk, was a professional contemporary dancer. The use of dance movements and positions in Berk's methodology was later expanded to include elements of yoga and pilates.

== Origins ==
The barre method was originally founded by Lotte Berk in 1959, combining elements of dance, yoga and pilates. She viewed barre as an arts-based method:

I don't want to be famous for my exercises. I don't want to be known as a keep-fit person. Oh, how I hate those words: keep fit. I want to be known for my creative dance, my artistic talents, to be taken seriously as an Artist.

— Lotte Berk, quoted by her daughter, Esther Fairfax

It was later popularised in the UK by her daughter, Esther Fairfax, and in the United States by a former student Lydia Bach, each with their own particular style.

It has now become a significant part of the fitness industry, encompassing a wide range of styles with boutique studios in major cities around the world.

== Other equipment ==
Other equipment is sometimes used in addition to the barre, such as resistance bands, yoga straps, exercise balls, and hand weights.

Pilates toning balls are also used.

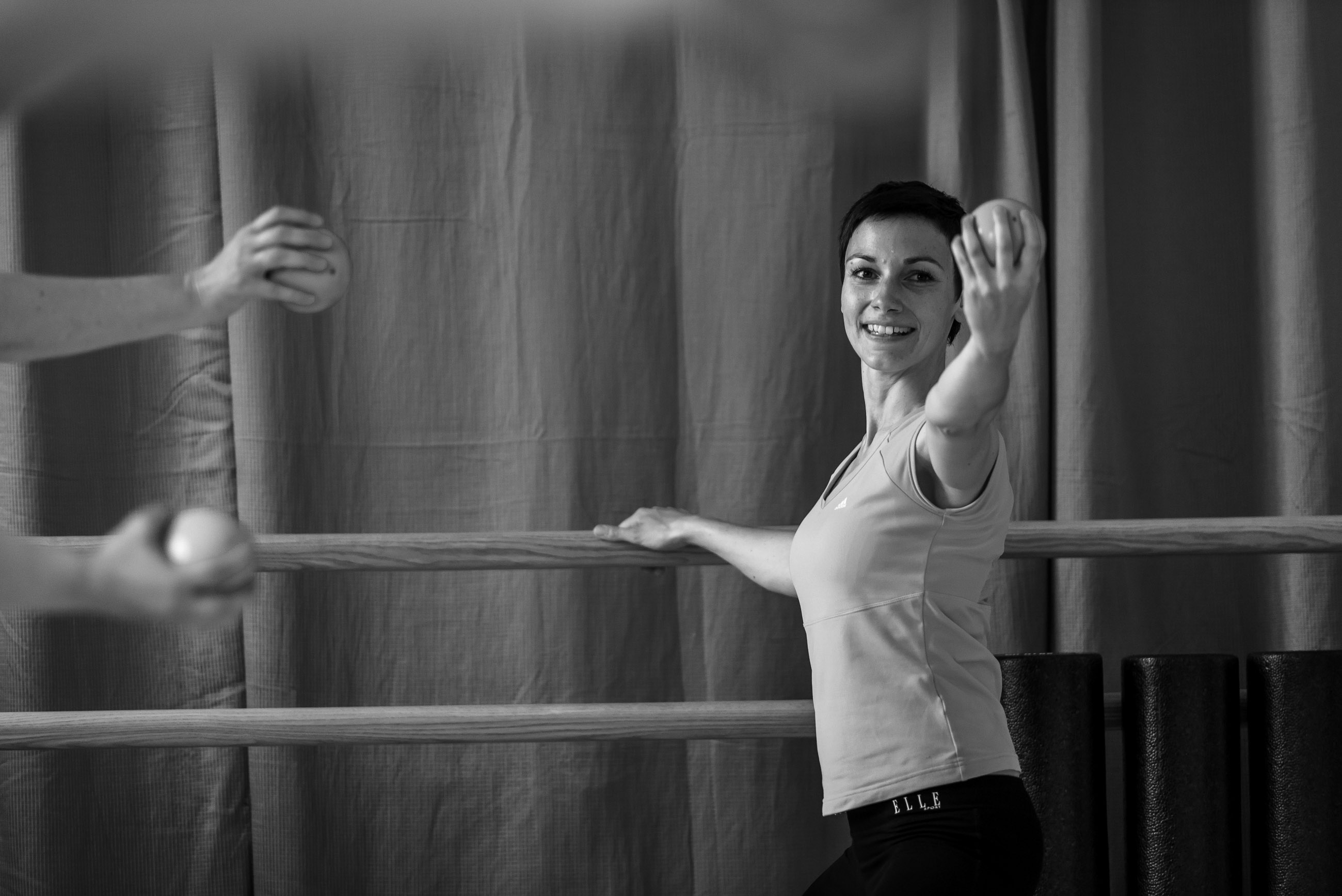
Barre workout with toning balls at the barre.

Participants wear activewear similar to that worn in yoga classes, and do the exercises either in bare feet or in socks. Some specialized socks ("grip socks") include non-slip features to increase traction.

== Typical nature of a barre class ==
Barre classes typically are specificity training, a method that targets one muscle group at a time to exhaustion. The exercises are repetitious in nature, usually varying from large range-of-motion to small, pulsing movements. Barre methodology also focuses on form, alignment and core engagement. As Barre is derived from ballet and contemporary dance, participants maintain upright posture while performing sequences or tucking which Berk inserted into her method to protect the lower back.

Barre classes feature repetitious sequence patterns that alternate in tempo, range-of-motion, and the use of light weights for toning and shaping the muscles (1–1.5kg or 2–3 pounds). Barre classes are designed to be a full-body workout that research has found improves muscle strength, shape, tone, control, flexibility and boosts mood and confidence. Barre has a reputation for elongating and toning the body, giving participants the deportment of a dancer, as Lotte Berk intended.

== History ==
=== History of the ballet barre ===
The word barre is traditionally associated with images of ballerinas in ballet class, as barre exercises have been an essential part of dancer training since at least the 18th century. Famous examples in art include Dancers Practicing at the Barre by Edgar Degas (1877).

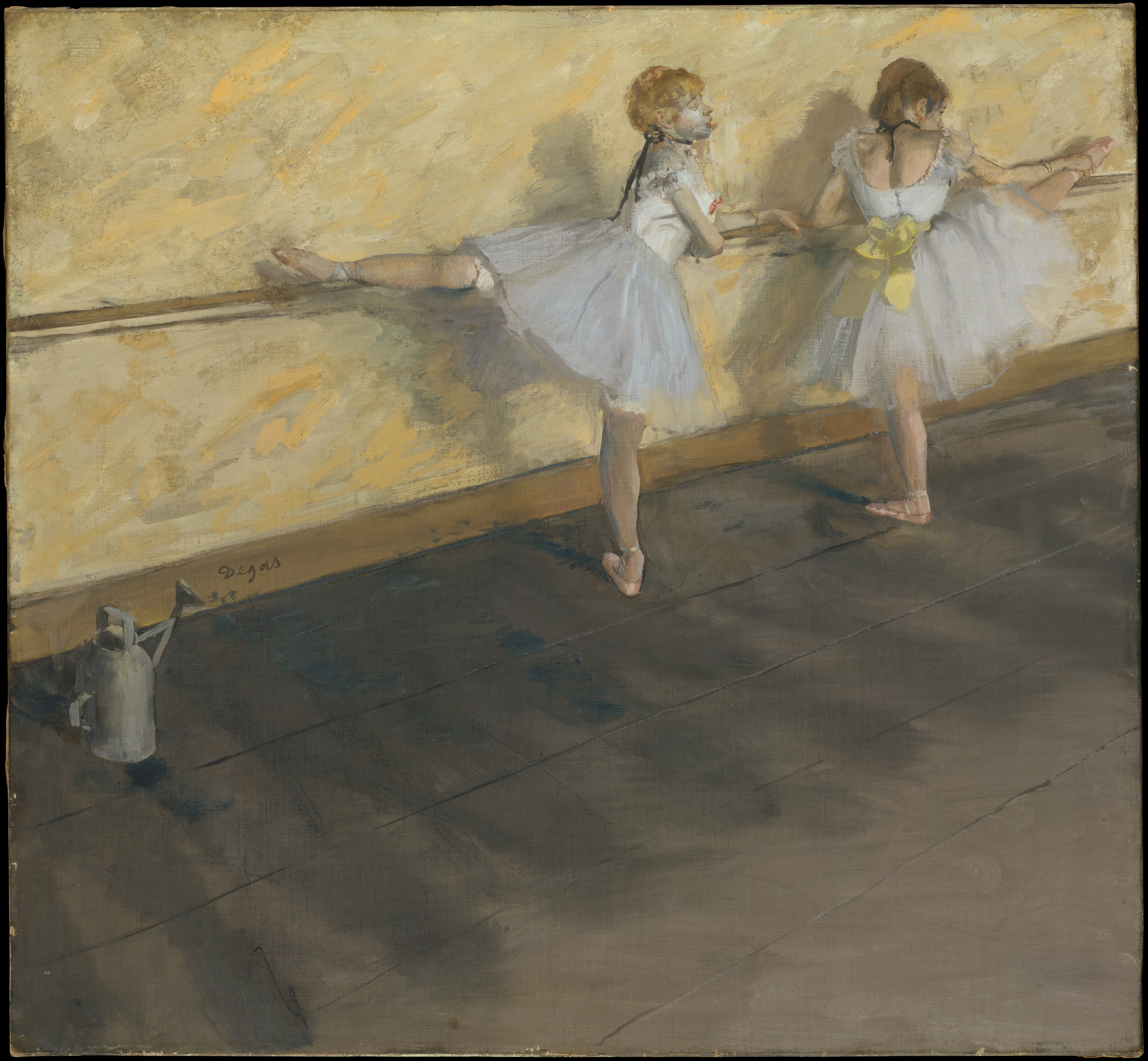
Edgar Degas, Dancers Practicing at the Barre, 1877.

=== Lotte Berk and development into specific form of exercise ===
The major development from barre in dance practice into a specific form of exercise began with the German-born dancer Lotte Berk. She launched her programme, Rehabilitative Exercise, from The Lotte Berk Studio in a basement on Manchester Street, London, in 1959. The dance-based programme offered women physical and psychological benefits, such as improvements in muscle strength, tone, posture, mood, and confidence. Original video recordings of Berk demonstrating her technique are available.

Berk viewed her programme as a performance art, underpinned by contemporary ballet, which had been a passion for her. Berk’s emphasis, therefore, was on the performing arts aspect of her creation rather than a fitness focus.

While Berk was successful and garnered notoriety, the actual substance and methodology of her original innovation was largely overlooked. Moreover, Berk never produced a teacher training manual, though she did publish a number of books on the Lotte Berk Method.

Lotte Berk’s original programme then initially evolved through the lens of three different women—Berk herself; Berk's former student, Lydia Bach; and Esther Fairfax, Berk's daughter. Berk's approach was dance-focused, Bach's was sports-focused, and Fairfax's focused on the 'everyday woman'.

These are the three original strands that seeded barre in the modern fitness industry.

=== Berk's daughter, Esther Fairfax ===
In the United Kingdom, Fairfax translated her mother’s programme into an organized, comprehensive, and more widely inclusive programme based on her experience as a wife, mother, psychologist, and teacher—one that would appeal to the everyday woman.

=== Lydia Bach and the rights to the Lotte Berk Method in the United States ===
Lydia Bach began training with Berk around 1969. Bach had a background in athletics and took Berk’s programme onto a sports-focused path.

In 1970, Berk and Bach entered into a licensing agreement that allowed Bach to open the Lotte Berk Method studio in New York City in 1971, which operated until 2005. Instructors from the studio went on to found some of the major chains providing barre classes, including Physique 57, The Bar Method, and Exhale Spa.

=== Expansion of barre in 2010s in US and UK ===
Barre rapidly expanded in popularity in the 2010s. By 2015, the Pure Barre chain alone had nearly 300 studios in the United States, and The Bar Method had over 80. The Los Angeles based chain Pop Physique popularized Barre by appealing to a younger urban hipster demographic, opening studios In Los Angeles, New York, and San Francisco.

Natalie Catlah brought barre back to the UK in 2009 with her studio in Newcastle Upon Tyne, The Barre Workout (The -B-Workout). Sadie Lincoln, co-founder of the barre3 chain of studios attributes the growth of popularity of barre to people wanting smaller, more connected fitness classes in the economic climate following the 2008 financial crisis. Tanya Becker, co-founder of the Physique 57 chain suggests that the appeal of barre is that classes deliver well-rounded exercise in a short space of time.

=== Barre in popular culture ===
The American Council on Exercise noted a rise in popularity of barre classes after the release of the 2010 movie Black Swan., although the film depicts the barre being used for ballet training, not as a standalone form of exercise.

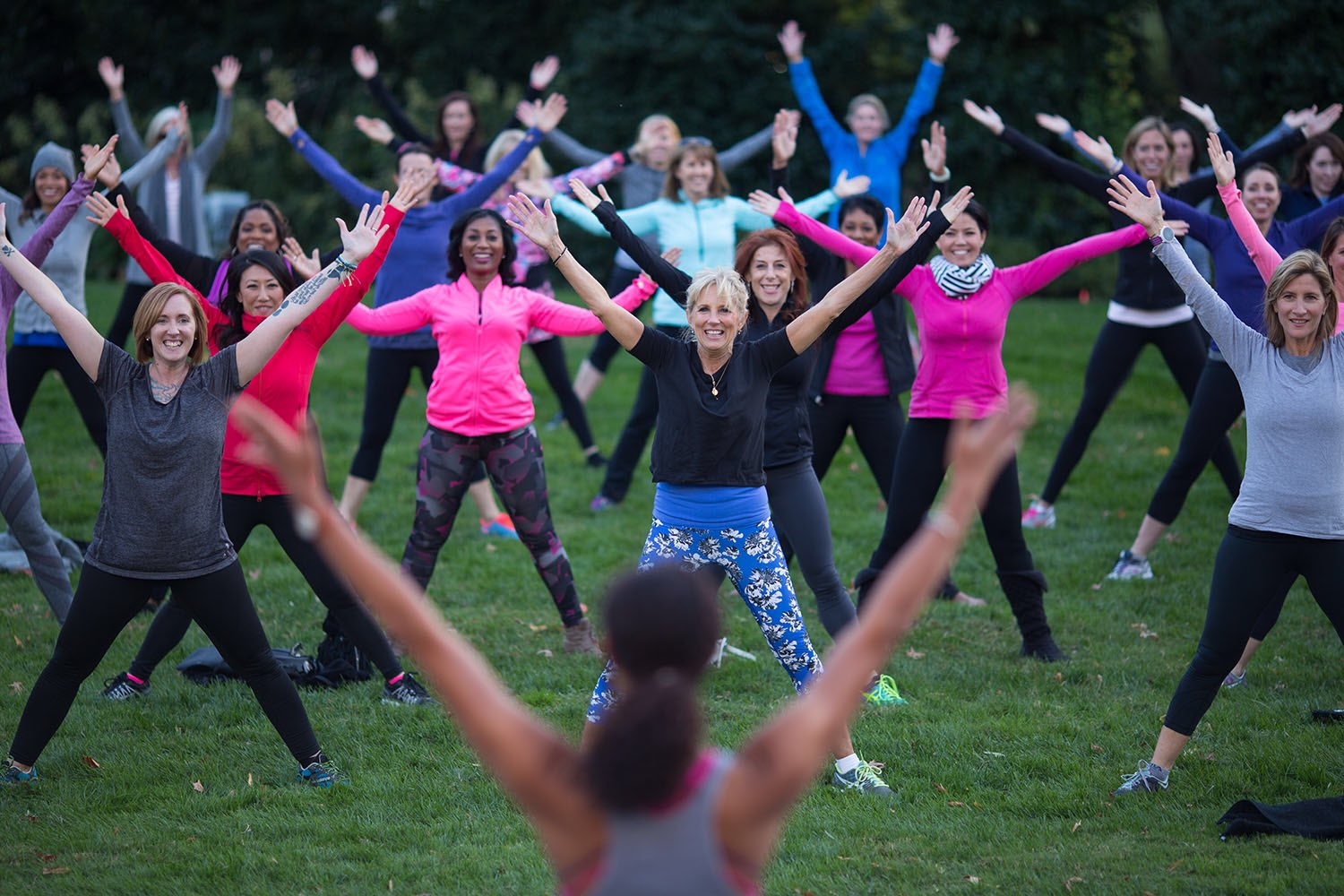
Jill Biden hosting a barre class at Number One Observatory Circle in 2016

In October 2016, Jill Biden hosted a barre class on the lawn at Number One Observatory Circle, the vice president’s residence in Washington, D.C., as part of activities associated with Breast Cancer Awareness Month.

== Benefits ==
There is limited peer-reviewed academic research on barre generally, but barre has been found to improve "the morphofunctional state, the level of physical fitness and the health of women [aged 25-31 years old]". There is also some evidence that "Engaging in barre exercise may be a safe, feasible way to meet exercise guidelines for Parkinson's disease".

=== Comparative benefits ===
A comparative study of Barre and Zumba/Dance Fit was conducted in 2018 at Queen's University Belfast. The study found "a modest indication that the Barre group participants were developing better one-legged balance skills than the Zumba/Dance Fit group".

=== Claims of benefits in the media ===
It is claimed that barre classes attract people who want to develop the lean muscle tone of a ballerina. Supposed benefits include improved strength, posture, flexibility, balance, stability, endurance, and muscle definition, together with weight loss and reduced stress. It is said that the exercises target muscles that support and stabilise the body and which are often neglected in everyday life and by other forms of exercise.

Beyond purely physical goals, barre is believed to develop control and a particular aesthetic.

== Criticisms and risks ==
There is similarly limited peer-reviewed academic research on the risks of barre.

=== Criticisms in the media ===
Criticisms of barre in the media generally focus on the supposed limitations of barre when compared to other forms of exercise. One criticism of barre is that strength gains from small, isometric exercises do not build functional strength in the same way that compound movements common in traditional strength training do, because many of the movements used in barre class are not used anywhere but in dance. However, the elements in the barre class or program are largely varied. Moreover, individual instructors are ultimately the source of the content in the class, thus, additional research is necessary to make such claims.

It is also claimed that barre classes are not as effective as traditional aerobics classes at building cardio-vascular fitness, typically only raising heart rates to 40–50% of maximum. In terms of energy output, it is claimed that barre typically does not burn many calories and its energy demands more closely resemble walking than running. However, there is a plethora of research that supports that low-impact exercises performed in a continuation, as in barre practices, is considered effective cardio-vascular fitness. Also, the content of the barre class and/or barre program largely varies, making it difficult to speak to caloric benefit in one format versus another. Therefore, the validity of such claims would need to consider the Barre methodology investigated.

Some barre classes adopt the ballet aesthetic of keeping the lower back straight, achieved by tucking the pelvis. There are claims that this practice can lead to back pain and related injuries. The balletic plié movement used in many barre classes relies on bending the knee outwards with the legs rotated away from the centreline of the body. The pressure this places on the knees is claimed to increase the risk of knee injury, particularly if someone chooses to go running immediately after a barre class.

Further research is necessary to determine which Barre program and specific training exercises are being investigated. Barre is a methodology that is not ballet and though elements of ballet and barre training overlap, the underpinning of Barre is to remove the injurious aspects of classical dance training. Berk incorporated tucking for exercises performed to the back or on the diagonal to support the lumbar region. However, the Lotte Berk Method does not incorporate tucking throughout the class. Also, the rotation of the legs in barre is in alignment with Pilates which is greatly inferior to classical ballet technique. Criticisms and risks would need to examine and identify the specific methodology and program targeted to understand the veracity of the claim(s).

== See also ==
- Lotte Berk
- Pilates
- Yoga
