= Calici =

Calici may refer to:

- Čalići, a village in Bosnia and Herzegovina
- Achille Calici (born 1565), Italian painter
- Caliciviridae, a family of viruses
- Limping calici, a disease of kittens

== See also ==
- Khalissi (disambiguation)
- Khaleesi (disambiguation)
