= Lotte Berk =

German dancer living in England (1913–2003)

- Born: Lieselotte Heymansohn; 13 January 1913; Cologne, Germany
- Died: 4 November 2003 (aged 90); Froxfield, Wiltshire, England
- Other name: Lieselotte Berk
- Occupations: Dancer, fitness trainer and teacher
- Spouse(s): Ernst Berk (m. 1933) (div.); Herbert Felix Rieser (m. 1964)
- Children: 1

Lieselotte "Lotte" Berk (13 January 1913 – 4 November 2003) was a German-born dancer and teacher, who lived in England from 1938. In 1959, she developed her own method of exercise drawing on her passions for dance and music with the idea of giving non-dancers a dancer's body. In the 21st century, derivatives of her method are offered by gyms and studios as barre classes.

== Biography ==
=== Early life ===
Lotte Berk was born Lieselotte Heymansohn on 13 January 1913, in Cologne, Germany, to a German mother and Russian-born father, both of whom were Jewish.

Her mother died of a stroke when Lotte was aged eight "perhaps sowing the seeds of her legendary emotional control and physical willpower".

Her father, Nicolai Heymansohn, had been a tailor and owned a chain of menswear shops.

Berk initially studied the piano for 11 years, according to her father's wishes, but she preferred dancing. In Berk's hometown of Cologne, she studied with a female Russian teacher who had attended the Mary Wigman Academy of Dance. At 18, Lotte was dancing with prominent companies, for famous choreographers and conductors including Carl Ebert, Bruno Walter and Fritz Busch, and at such events as the Salzburg Festival in Austria.

Together with her husband, Ernst Berk, she also performed as a dance duo, often accompanied on piano by pianist Norbert Schultze. In 1931, the couple appeared in programmes at the Cologne cabaret Kolibri.

=== Marriage and escape from Nazi Germany ===
In 1933, she married a fellow dancer Ernst Berk, and their daughter Esther (now Esther Fairfax) was born the following year. In the year of their marriage, the Berks opened a school for gymnastics and dance in Cologne.

In 1934, Lotte Berk was warned not to perform at a planned appearance in the main hall of the Bürgergesellschaft, as she would risk arrest as a Jewish woman, and so her husband performed alone. In a 1989 interview, she recalled that she had stood backstage and the audience had called out: "Dance, Lotte, dance." She then went on stage, even though the auditorium was full of SS men. She was presented with flowers and a basket containing food and small garments for her young daughter. The SS men then stormed the stage, shouting "raus, raus" ("get out, get out"). "It was the most dramatic evening of my life," she later recalled. The following day, Lotte Berk's money and passport were confiscated and her teaching licence was revoked.

After Ernst Berk was prohibited from issuing graduation diplomas to his students, making it impossible to continue running the school, the family fled to England in 1935, accompanied by their nanny Mimi, which was possible because Ernst held a British passport. According to Lotte Berk's later account, the couple initially lived in a small room and slept on the floor, with the child in a suitcase and the nanny in the only bed.

In 1939, Lotte Berk travelled back to Germany to persuade her father and sister to leave the country. Her sister followed her. However, her father initially remained in Cologne, then later fled to the Netherlands, but was eventually deported together with his second wife to Auschwitz, where he was murdered on 26 February 1943.

In England, Berk worked as a model at the Chelsea Art School and danced at the Covent Garden for Marie Rambert. Berk later toured with the Entertainments National Service Association (ENSA).

=== The Rehabilitative Exercise programme ===
Berk's style of dancing did not appeal to the British and she knew she would have to change careers to make a living. Her program, Rehabilitative Exercise, was launched in 1959 from a basement studio at 29 Manchester Street in the West End of London. The program was based on Berk's contemporary dance career and rehabilitation for a drug addiction. Berk was 46 at the time, and the studio was for women only. She gave certain exercises unusual names, such as "the Prostitute", "the Peeing Dog" and the "French Lavatory".

Some sources report that it was after injuring her back in a car accident that Berk got the idea of combining her ballet barre routines with her rehabilitative therapy to form an exercise system.

Barre was created by the German ballerina Lotte Berk, who was forced to leave the stage after a serious injury and invented fitness, which helped her keep fit, keep her chiseled body without daily ballet training and enjoy aesthetic and effective exercises. Subsequently, the method included elements of Pilates and yoga, it became more versatile and accessible.

— Krasova, Semyzorova & Deineko

Accounts from sources close to Berk, however, record that, while the program was based on Berk's contemporary dance career, it was motivated by rehabilitation for a morphine addiction and the end of an intense love relationship.

A spinal injury sustained while teaching class, which occurred after the origination of the Rehabilitative Exercise program, was used as a pretext for Berk's innovation because she was loath to divulge the facts of her addiction. Similar to Pilates, Berk's method concentrates on specificity, targeting muscle groups for strength and flexibility training.

=== End of marriage ===
In her 40s, she moved in with a painter, with the permission of her husband, who suggested that she do so for two years, after which he would take her back. At the age of 50, her 30-year marriage came to an end. She married again, to Herbert Felix Rieser, a commercial photographer, in 1964; the second marriage lasted three weeks, though they maintained a lasting friendship.

=== Teaching and famous students ===
Berk continued to teach her Rehabilitative Exercise method well into her 80s. Her clients included Joan Collins, Britt Ekland, Barbra Streisand, Siân Phillips, Edna O'Brien, Yasmin Le Bon, Zoë Wanamaker, Maureen Lipman, Prue Leith, Shirley Conran, Barbara Ferris, Lee Remick, Carol Linley, Yolande Donlan, and Beverly Sassoon.

=== Death and legacy ===
Berk died aged 90 on 4 November 2003 at the Brendoncare Foundation, Froxfield, Wiltshire. She was survived by her daughter, Esther Fairfax, who continued to teach her mother's method from a studio at Hungerford, in Berkshire, and wrote a biography of Berk entitled My Improper Mother and Me.

== Lydia Bach and expansion to the United States ==
Lydia Bach began training with Berk around 1969, when Bach's friend Britt Ekland invited Bach to Berk's exercise class, which was considered "all the rage" at the time. Bach was inspired by Berk's exercises, but also admired her character.

Lydia Bach called her new business venture the Lotte Berk Method, and it launched in the Upper East Side of New York City in 1971. In the United States, Bach explored ways to modify Berk's methodology to cater to the American marketplace. Bach, who was well-versed in athletics, sent Berk's program onto a sports-focused trajectory.

== Esther Fairfax and formalization of the program in the United Kingdom ==
In the United Kingdom, Esther Fairfax translated her mother's method into an organized, comprehensive, and more widely inclusive program based on her experience as a wife, mother, psychologist, and teacher—one that would appeal to the everyday woman.

== Contemporary legacy in the United States and United Kingdom ==
These various modifications to the original methodology, Rehabilitative Exercise, set the foundation for the Barre programs that are practiced in the United States and United Kingdom today. Berk's and Fairfax's intimate class size of up to ten students became the model for "boutique" studios, while Bach's expansive range of programs inspired corporate group fitness. The closing of Bach's studios seeded the Barre industry in the United States, as several of her former teacher employees opened their own private studios and/or corporate franchises. Berk never taught outside the United Kingdom, and her only visit to the United States was as Bach's guest in the early 1970s to see the newly-opened Lotte Berk Method studio.

== Books ==
- Lotte Berk Method of Exercise, Lotte Berk and Jean Prince, Quartet Books, 1979. ISBN 978-0704332188
- Lotte Berk Method, Lotte Berk, Natural Journeys, 2003. ISBN 978-1585659722
- Doctor Barre, Jill Rose Jacobs, PhD, 2022. ISBN 979-8419619074
- The True History of Barre and the Lotte Berk Method, Jill Rose Jacobs, PhD, 2025. ISBN 979-8262527083
