= Physique 57 =

- Industry: Fitness
- Founded: 2006
- Founders: Jennifer Maanavi & Tanya Becker
- Headquarters: New York City
- Website: Physique57.com

Physique 57 is a global fitness and media company headquartered in New York City with studios and digital platforms. It has corporate-owned and licensed studios in the US, the United Arab Emirates, India, and Thailand.

Founded by Jennifer Vaughan Maanavi and Tanya Becker in 2006, Physique 57 was designed around the concept of the popular Lotte Berk Method (a fitness studio that offered the eponymous technique created in the 1950s by a former ballet dancer).

== History ==
The company was co-founded by Jennifer Maanavi and Tanya Becker in 2005.

The company launched a franchise business in 2019 and, in 2021, launched an 80-hour virtual barre certification program.

=== Expansion ===
In February 2006, Physique 57 began at 24 W. 57th Street in New York City, United States. Its Bridgehampton outpost opened in Lotte Berk's former space at 264 Butter Lane Barn. In the fall of 2007, the Spring Street location opened in Soho's historic Butterick building.

In June 2010, Physique 57 Beverly Hills launched its studio. In August 2011, it opened its third Manhattan studio on the Upper West Side, in the Ansonia.

In the summer of 2013, Physique 57 opened its first international studio in Dubai. In 2014, it opened its second international studio in Bangkok and in 2015, opened another international studio in Dubai.

In January 2016, Physique 57 opened its fourth Manhattan studio in the Financial District. In 2017, Bangkok opened two more locations. In 2018, the Mumbai studio was launched.

In 2020, during the COVID-19 pandemic, Physique 57 closed most of its NYC studios.

In 2021, the company began rebuilding its geographic footprint. They opened licensed studios in Bandra and Bangalore, India, Brooklyn, NY, and Hoboken, NJ, as well as new studios in NYC.

In 2025, the company opened a 2 story flagship studio in the NoMad neighborhood of Manhattan.

== Partnerships ==
Physique 57 partnered with Biore Skincare in 2010 and with Fitbit in 2019. It has also partnered with One&Only Ocean Club and in 2021 with FlexIt.

It had also partnered with Plus One (2012), Canyon Ranch (2010), QVC (2012-2014), and Aaptiv (2020).

In 2023, Physique 57 partnered with Fitness on Demand to provide online barre workouts to FOD viewers globally. It also has a studio residency at the Waldorf Astoria New York.

The company also licenses the Physique 57 method to Drop Fitness, an innovative fitness complex in Montvale, NJ (2021).

In November 2025, Physique 57 launched a residency at the newly renovated Guerlain Spa at the Waldorf Astoria Hotel, located at 301 Park Avenue. The residency marked the partnership of two NYC icons to deliver first-class wellness options to the Waldorf's hotel guests and Physique 57 clients.

== Recognition ==
The company was named No. 377 in Inc. Magazine's list of the 500 fastest growing companies in America in 2010. In 2021, Physique 57 was named a top 20 fitness app by Good Housekeeping.

In 2022, it won The 6 best brands in the beauty business - Vogue Beauty Awards.

In an assessment of New York City's premier fitness destinations, The Fit Guide's international rating system evaluated 50 of the city's top studios and awarded Physique 57 with their 5-star award.
