= The Old Gods and the New =

- Game of Thrones episode
- Episode no.: Season 2 Episode 6
- Directed by: David Nutter
- Written by: Vanessa Taylor
- Cinematography by: Martin Kenzie
- Editing by: Oral Norrie Ottey
- Original air date: May 6, 2012
- Running time: 54 minutes

Guest appearances
- Donald Sumpter as Maester Luwin; Ron Donachie as Rodrik Cassel; Natalia Tena as Osha; Michael McElhatton as Roose Bolton; Nonso Anozie as Xaro Xhoan Daxos; Nicholas Blane as the Spice King; Tom Wlaschiha as Jaqen H'ghar; Rose Leslie as Ygritte; Gwendoline Christie as Brienne of Tarth; Oona Chaplin as Talisa Mygaer; Simon Armstrong as Qhorin Halfhand; Ralph Ineson as Dagmer Cleftjaw; Ian Beattie as Ser Meryn Trant; Fintan McKeown as Amory Lorch; Forbes KB as Black Lorren; Amrita Acharia as Irri; Kristian Nairn as Hodor; Steven Cole as Kovarro; Aimee Richardson as Myrcella Baratheon; Art Parkinson as Rickon Stark; Callum Wharry as Tommen Baratheon

Episode chronology
← Previous "The Ghost of Harrenhal"	Next → "A Man Without Honor"
- Game of Thrones season 2

"The Old Gods and the New" is the sixth episode of the second season of HBO's medieval fantasy television series Game of Thrones, and the 16th episode overall. The episode was directed by David Nutter, his directorial debut for the series, and written by Vanessa Taylor. It first aired on May 6, 2012.

In the episode, a riot breaks out in King's Landing as King Joffrey Baratheon passes through Flea Bottom; Theon Greyjoy seizes Winterfell and executes Ser Rodrik Cassel; Arya Stark struggles to stay undercover at Harrenhal; Robb Stark flirts with Talisa, a field nurse, before learning of Theon's attack; Jon Snow and his companions ambush a wildling outpost beyond the Wall; and Daenerys Targaryen discovers that her dragons have been stolen in Qarth. The episode's title refers to both the "Old Gods", a religion practiced by the long-extinct natives of Westeros, Children of the Forest, and still present mainly in the North, and the "New Gods", the prevalent religion brought over in the time when the First Men came to Westeros but still present in most of the country.

This episode was acclaimed by critics, who praised the King's Landing riot sequence, character development, and final scenes, and won a Primetime Emmy Award for Outstanding Makeup for a Single-Camera Series (Non-Prosthetic).

== Plot ==
=== Beyond the Wall ===
Qhorin's expedition captures a wildling watchpost, killing all but Ygritte, whom Jon finds himself unable to kill, and she escapes. Jon recaptures her but is separated from the party. With night approaching, Ygritte convinces Jon to share body warmth.

=== At Winterfell ===
Having taken Winterfell, Theon promises to Bran that he won't harm the inhabitants. When Ser Rodrik spits on Theon, Dagmer insists Theon needs to personally execute him since the other Ironborn will not respect him if he lets that stand. Despite the urgings of Bran and others, Theon decapitates Ser Rodrik. Osha seduces Theon in exchange for her freedom, giving her, Hodor, Bran and Rickon the opportunity to escape Winterfell.

=== In King's Landing ===
Myrcella Baratheon is sent to Dorne for her marriage alliance with House Martell. King Joffrey, struck in the face with manure, orders his guards to kill the crowd, igniting a riot. Tyrion slaps Joffrey and tries to take control, but the Kingsguard refuse to obey him. Sansa is nearly gang-raped by several men before being rescued by Sandor "The Hound" Clegane.

=== In the Westerlands ===
As Robb flirts with field nurse Talisa, Catelyn arrives. Discovering the nurse is Lady Talisa Maegyr from the Free City of Volantis and sensing Robb's attraction, Catelyn reminds him he is to marry Walder Frey's daughter. Receiving news of Theon's betrayal and Ser Rodrik's execution, Robb declares he will recapture Winterfell, but Roose Bolton advises he will lose what he has gained against the Lannisters. Bolton proposes sending his bastard son with the forces left at his stronghold, the Dreadfort, and Robb reluctantly agrees, demanding Theon be taken alive so he can personally execute him.

=== At Harrenhal ===
Exasperated at his men's incompetence, Tywin observes that Arya can read well, contradicting her false identity. Petyr Baelish arrives, and Arya tries to conceal her face; it is unclear whether he recognises her. Ser Amory Lorch catches Arya with stolen war orders concerning Robb. She manages to escape, and implores Jaqen H'ghar to claim her second life. As Ser Amory enters Tywin's chambers to expose Arya, he drops dead with a poisoned dart in his neck.

=== In Qarth ===
The Spice King, one of Qarth's ruling Thirteen, rebuffs Daenerys's entreaties for ships. Returning to Xaro's mansion, Daenerys and her entourage discover that Qartheen guards, members of her khalasar, and her handmaiden Irri have been killed and her dragons stolen. The dragons are ferried to a tower by a mysterious hooded figure.

== Production ==
=== Writing ===
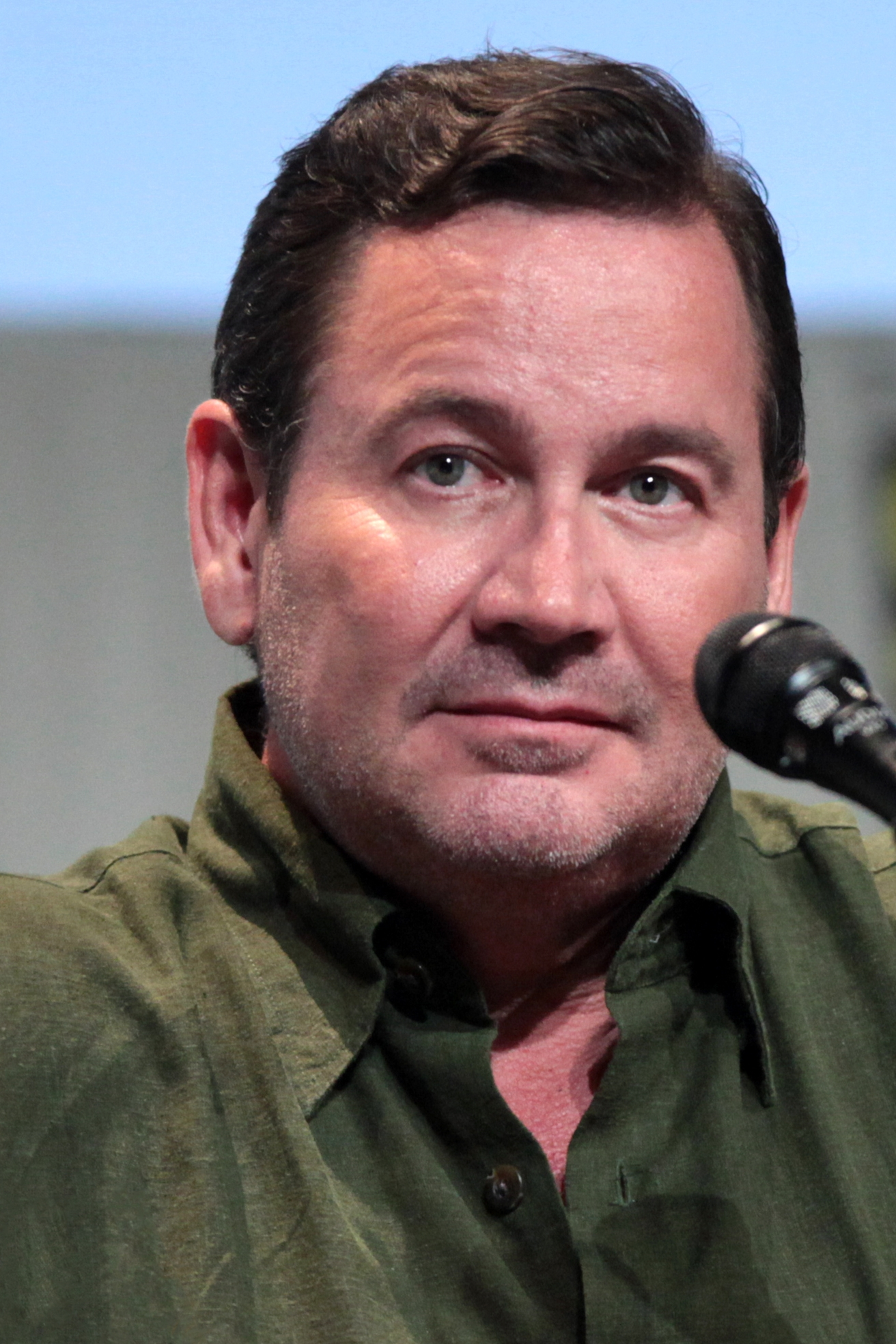
The episode was directed by David Nutter.

"The Old Gods and the New" is the second episode scripted by the season's new addition to the writing staff Vanessa Taylor, adapting the material taken from the following chapters of George R.R. Martin's original work A Clash of Kings: Arya VIII, Daenerys III, Tyrion IX, Bran VI, Jon VI (39, 41, 42, 47, 52). Also, the opening scene with the ironborn taking Winterfell uses elements from three different chapters: Theon IV, V, and VI (51, 57 and 67).

Some of the most significant changes from the books include Jon not letting Ygritte leave after refusing to execute her, the executions of Rodrik and Irri (in the books Rodrik is not killed until later, and Irri is still alive by the end of the fifth book), and Arya using her second wish to kill Amory Lorch instead of Weese, a cruel understeward who does not appear in the series. The Reed children have not been introduced yet: in the books they aid in Bran and Rickon's escape from Winterfell. Furthermore, at this point the Qarth storyline is only loosely based on the source material, as the theft of Daenerys's dragons does not occur in the books.

=== Casting ===
This episode features the introduction of Rose Leslie playing the Wildling woman Ygritte. The producers had seen her in Downton Abbey, where she had played Gwen Dawson, and they had admired her ability to do Northern accents. The Scottish actress used a Yorkshire accent in Downton Abbey. She was also trained in basic stage combat at the London Academy of Music and Dramatic Art and was eager to play the most physical aspects of her role.

Two prominent recurring guests actors had their last appearance in the show. Winterfell's master-at-arms Rodrik Cassel (Ron Donachie) and the Dothraki handmaiden Irri (Amrita Acharia) were killed, and in both cases their deaths in the series was far earlier than their deaths in the original books. Acharia was surprised when she found out that Irri died, but felt that the death served a purpose making Daenerys more isolated. A scene depicting how Irri was strangled was actually filmed but was not included in the final montage. The actress revealed: "I think it's hard to be strangled onscreen because obviously to an extent to make it look real, you really have to be a bit strangled. So I had massive bruises on my neck the next day. I was proud. Battle scars."

=== Filming locations ===
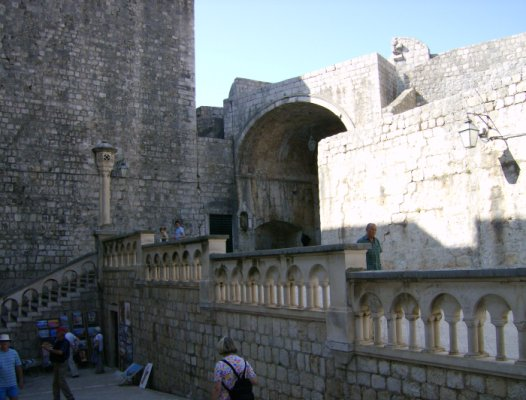
The riot was filmed by the Pile Gates, at the main entrance to Dubrovnik's old city.

The episode's interior shots continued to be filmed at Belfast's The Paint Hall, while the scenes at Winterfell and Harrenhal were filmed at the sets built at Moneyglass and Banbridge, respectively.

Iceland was used to depict the far north, and the scenes from this episode (and the next one) were filmed at the glacier Svínafellsjökull in Vatnajökull National Park, close to Skaftafell.

In Dubrovnik, the production used the seashore between Fort Bokar and Fort Lovrijenac to film Myrcella's departure, the Pile Gate's inner gateway for the riot scene, the inner terrace of Fort Lovrijenac for the refuge where the royal family hides from the mob, and the Rector's Palace for the atrium of the Spice King in Qarth. In this later location, the bust of the Croatian 16th-century seaman Miho Pracat can be clearly seen.

== Reception ==
=== Ratings ===
The viewership of the episode's first airing held steady, obtaining 3.879 million viewers and a 2.0 among the 18-49 demographic. The repeat was watched by 0.832 million additional viewers, also in line with last week's rating In the United Kingdom, the episode was seen by 0.870 million viewers on Sky Atlantic, being the channel's highest-rated broadcast that week.

=== Critical reception ===
Upon airing, the episode received overwhelming critical praise. Review aggregator Rotten Tomatoes surveyed 14 reviews and judged 100% of them to be positive with an average score of 9.3 out of 10. The website's critical consensus reads, "Thanks to a balance of thrilling action, complex character work, and a savage twist, 'The Old Gods and The New' justifies its deviation from the source material." IGN's Matt Fowler gave the episode a perfect 10 out of 10, noting that "Book purists will certainly have their gripes, but I found 'The Old Gods and the New' to be nothing short of an intense triumph; (sic) filled with tons of cruelty and shock." Emily VanDerWerff of The A.V. Club gave the episode an "A" and called it one of the best episodes of the series. She commented on how the plot was diverging more and more from the novel, but argued that the heart of the story was kept and that the changes were necessary in order to explicitly express what in the novel was characters' internal monologues. She also praised the thematic unity of the episode, achieved by making the large number of character arcs take place in the course of a single day.

Jace Lacob of Televisionary echoed the above sentiments, calling the episode by far the best of the season thus far: "All in all, 'The Old Gods and New' represented a massive achievement for Game of Thrones, a stunning display of well-crafted dialogue, subtle acting, deliberate pacing, and glorious setting, and the firm establishment that the show's continuity is well and truly separate from that of the novels." In particular, he praised the scenes between Arya and Tywin, as well as the riot in King's Landing and the near-rape of Sansa.

=== Accolades ===
This episode received a Primetime Emmy Award nomination for Outstanding Hairstyling for a Single-Camera Series. It won for Outstanding Makeup for a Single-Camera Series (Non-Prosthetic).
