= The Ghost of Harrenhal =

- Game of Thrones episode
- Episode no.: Season 2 Episode 5
- Directed by: David Petrarca
- Written by: David Benioff; D. B. Weiss
- Cinematography by: Martin Kenzie
- Editing by: Katie Weiland
- Original air date: April 29, 2012
- Running time: 54 minutes

Guest appearances
- Donald Sumpter as Maester Luwin; Roy Dotrice as Pyromancer Hallyne; Ron Donachie as Rodrik Cassel; Gwendoline Christie as Brienne of Tarth; Natalia Tena as Osha; Gethin Anthony as Renly Baratheon; Ian Hanmore as Pyat Pree; Tom Wlaschiha as Jaqen H'ghar; Joe Dempsie as Gendry; Eugene Simon as Lancel Lannister; Simon Armstrong as Qhorin Halfhand; Mark Stanley as Grenn; Finn Jones as Loras Tyrell; Ben Crompton as Edd Tollet; Roxanne McKee as Doreah; Amrita Acharia as Irri; Steven Cole as Kovarro; Nonso Anozie as Xaro Xhoan Daxos; Gemma Whelan as Yara Greyjoy; Kristian Nairn as Hodor; Ben Hawkey as Hot Pie; Ralph Ineson as Dagmer Cleftjaw; Forbes KB as Black Lorren; Fintan McKeown as Armory Lorch; Edward Tudor-Pole as a Protestor; Laura Pradelska as Quaithe; Patrick Fitzsymons as Reginald Lannister; Art Parkinson as Rickon Stark; Aimee Richardson as Myrcella Baratheon

Episode chronology
| ← Previous "Garden of Bones" | Next → "The Old Gods and the New" |
- Game of Thrones season 2

"The Ghost of Harrenhal" is the fifth episode of the second season of HBO's medieval fantasy television series Game of Thrones. It was written by series co-creators David Benioff and D. B. Weiss and directed by David Petrarca, his second episode this season. It premiered on April 29, 2012.

"The Ghost of Harrenhal" is how Arya Stark describes herself while at Harrenhal in A Clash of Kings, the novel on which the season is based, although the phrase is not heard in the episode. This episode marks the final appearance of Gethin Anthony as Renly Baratheon.

The episode received generally positive reviews from critics, who mainly praised the character interactions, but were critical of Renly's death scene, considering it rushed.

== Plot ==
=== In the Stormlands ===
As Renly and Catelyn negotiate an alliance, Melisandre's shadow creature kills Renly and disappears. Brienne, mistaken for the murderer, is forced to slay Renly's guards and escape with Catelyn. Brienne and Catelyn stop beside a river to discuss her return to Winterfell and Renly's death. Brienne swears allegiance to Catelyn, who promises not to interfere with Brienne's vengeance against Stannis.

Loras also blames Stannis, but Littlefinger and Margaery convince him to flee. Stannis arrives, and his dead brother's bannermen swear fealty to him. Following Davos' advice, Melisandre's blood magic is not used for the King's Landing assault; Stannis gives a reluctant Davos command of the fleet.

=== On the Iron Islands ===
Despite Theon's lineage and title, his new ship's crew have little respect for him. Yara comes to make jokes at him. First mate Dagmer Cleftjaw explains Theon must win their respect. When Dagmer proposes assaulting the Northern town of Torrhen's Square, Theon realizes that will leave Winterfell poorly defended for a takeover.

=== In King's Landing ===
Tyrion learns from Lancel that Cersei is stockpiling King Aerys's dangerously flammable "wildfire", and visits the royal pyromancer, Wisdom Hallyne, who reveals a massive cache of wildfire Joffrey intends to catapult at Stannis' forces. Bronn doubts the logistics and odds of Joffrey's idea, so Tyrion claims the cache for his own plan.

=== At Harrenhal ===
Tywin holds council to discuss Robb. Tywin deduces Arya is a Northerner, but remains unaware of her true identity. Jaqen H'ghar, disguised as a Lannister guardsman, offers Arya "three lives" in return for saving him and two others from their burning caravan cell. She designates "The Tickler", Harrenhal's cruel interrogator, as her first victim. He is found dead, and Jaqen signals to Arya that the first life debt has been paid, leaving Arya pleased.

=== At Winterfell ===
Receiving news that Torrhen's Square is under attack, Bran urges Rodrik to raise defenders. He tells Osha of his dreams featuring a "three-eyed raven" but she deflects his inquiries.

=== Beyond the Wall ===
The Night's Watch meet legendary ranger Qhorin Halfhand at the Fist of the First Men, an ancient fortification. Qhorin warns that the wildlings have become more organized and dangerous under former ranger Mance Rayder. Jon Snow volunteers to join Qhorin in eliminating a wildling watchpost.

=== In Qarth ===
Daenerys holds court at Qarth as her dragons grow. The warlock Pyat Pree invites Daenerys to visit the "House of the Undying", while the masked Quaithe warns Jorah of dangers facing Daenerys. Xaro asks to marry Daenerys in exchange for resources to take King's Landing. Jorah argues that Daenerys must win the Iron Throne on her own, and she eventually agrees.

== Production ==
=== Writing ===
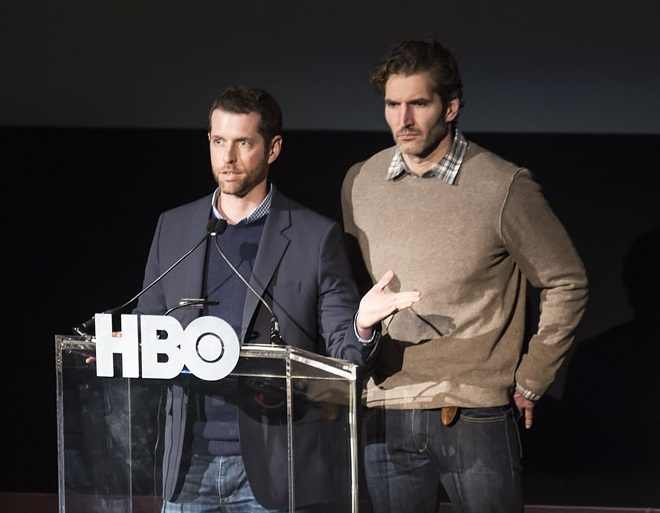
The episode was written by series co-creators David Benioff and D. B. Weiss.

"The Ghost of Harrenhal" is the fifth episode of the second season written by the two showrunners David Benioff and D.B. Weiss, and the fifteenth in the whole series. The script is based on the chapters Daenerys II, Arya VII, Catelyn IV, Jon IV, Bran V, Catelyn V, and Jon V (28, 31, 34, 35, 36, 40, and 44) from George R. R. Martin's A Clash of Kings. Tyrion's scenes with the Pyromancers and Cersei are taken from the chapters Tyrion V and Tyrion VIII (21 and 37).

There are numerous divergences from the source material: in the books Lord Baelish is sent by the council to negotiate with the Tyrells only after Renly is dead; Theon's departure from Pyke is not shown, and Dagmer Cleftjaw is a scarred old master-at-arms who is fond of Theon because Cleftjaw trained him when Theon was a boy; Arya is a scullion instead of a cupbearer and is not able to interact with Lord Tywin; and the character of Xaro Xhoan Daxos has been drastically changed making him a black heterosexual of humble origins and giving him a vault that is never mentioned in the books.

=== Casting ===
The episode introduces the character of the pyromancer "Wisdom" Hallyne, played by the British actor Roy Dotrice. Dotrice is a personal friend of George R. R. Martin, since the two met while working on the 1980s hit TV series, Beauty and the Beast (Martin as a producer, and Dotrice playing "Father"). Years later, Dotrice was Martin's choice to read the audiobooks of A Song of Ice and Fire, a work that brought Dotrice a Guinness World Record for the largest number of characters voiced in an audiobook.

After the series was greenlighted, Martin wanted to involve Dotrice, suggesting Maester Aemon, Rodrik Cassel or Grand Maester Pycelle as possible roles. He was eventually cast as Pycelle, but he had to withdraw from the show for medical reasons and Julian Glover was cast to replace him. In the second season, with his health recovered, he was given the role of Hallyne.

Other characters introduced in the episode are the Night's Watch ranger Qhorin Halfhand, played by Simon Armstrong, and the mysterious Quaithe, played by the German actress Laura Pradelska. This is also the first episode in which Pyat Pree (briefly seen standing in Episode 4) has any lines.

=== Filming locations ===
The episode's interior shots were filmed at The Paint Hall studios, close to Belfast, where the main sets are located. Also in Northern Ireland were filmed the scenes at Harrenhal (in a set built near Banbridge) and Pyke (at the port of Ballintoy). Renly's camp was once again filmed on the country's northern coast.

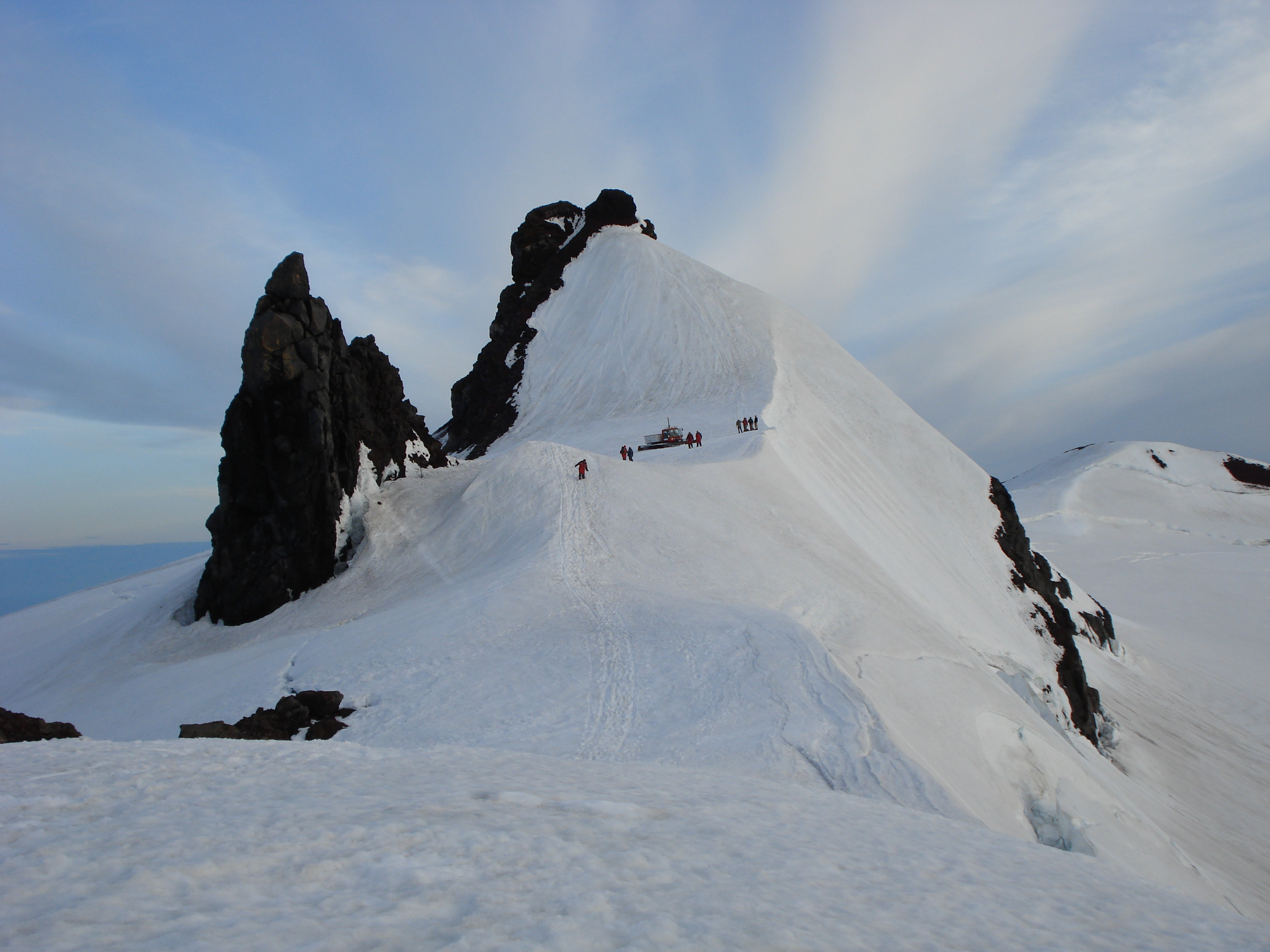
The crew used the Icelandic volcano of Snæfellsjökull to represent the vast mountain chains of the Frostfangs.

After having filmed the Night's Watch storyline beyond the Wall in Northern Irish forests for the first four episodes of the season, the producers decided that the unexplored land further to the north would be filmed in Iceland. According to the creator George R. R. Martin's vision of the setting, "the area closest to my Wall is densely forested (...). And then as you get further and further north, it changes. You get into tundra and ice fields and it becomes more of an arctic environment. You have plains on one side and a very high range of mountains on the other."

Co-Producer Chris Newman said that until then they had been able to reproduce the lands north of the Wall by adding artificial snow, but now they needed a bigger landscape. According to David Benioff, they always "wanted something shatteringly beautiful and barren and brutal for this part of Jon's journey, because he's in the true North now."

To represent the Frostfangs and The Fist of the First Men, the production filmed at the glacier at Snæfellsjökull, and also at the glacier of Svínafellsjökull in Smyrlabjörg and the hills of Höfðabrekkuheiði (near Vík).

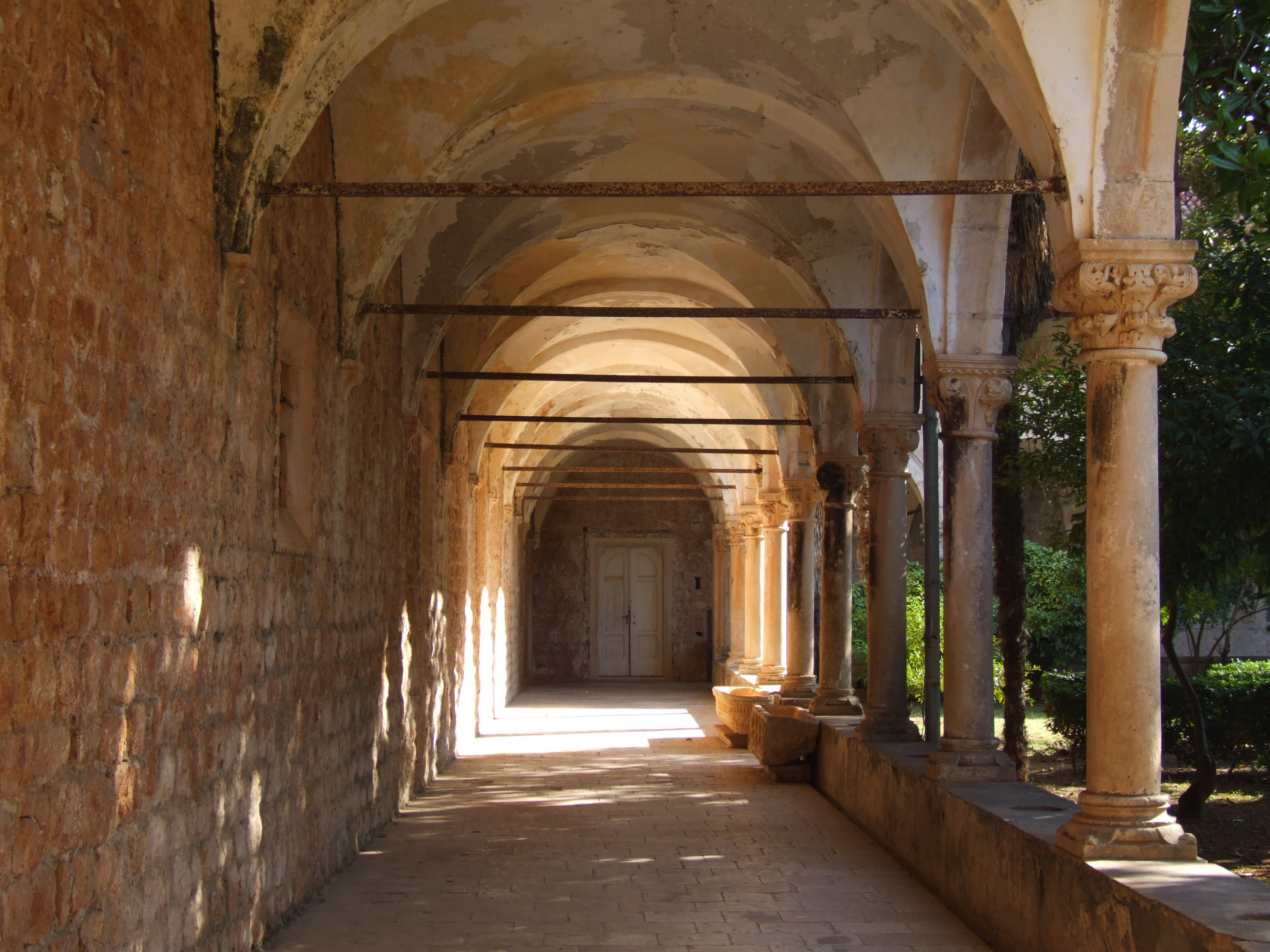
The Benedictine monastery of Lokrum was used as a Qartheen garden.

The other main location introduced in the episode was the gardens of Qarth, which were filmed at the Benedictine monastery of the Croatian island of Lokrum. The abandoned monastery was built in Gothic-Renaissance style in the 15th century.

The island of Lokrum is only 680 metres offshore from Dubrovnik, the location used for King Landing's exteriors, and can be reached by boat in 15 minutes. Coincidentally, Lokrum shares with its fictional counterpart of Qarth having peacocks among its distinctive features: Lokrum is inhabited by families of peacocks that were introduced to the island in the 19th century by the Austrian archduke Maximilian.

== Reception ==
=== Ratings ===
The first airing of the episode obtained 3.903 million viewers, which represented the series high to date, and a 1.9 in the 18-49 demographic. The encore airing brought an additional 0.8 million for a total of 4.7 million. In the United Kingdom, the episode was seen by 0.851 million viewers on Sky Atlantic, being the channel's highest-rated broadcast that week.

=== Critical reception ===
"The Ghost of Harrenhal" received generally positive reviews. Review aggregator Rotten Tomatoes surveyed 12 reviews and judged 92% of them to be positive with an average score of 8.6 out of 10. The website's critical consensus reads, "'The Ghost of Harrenhal' utilizes some unexpected character pairings to explore GOT's shifting power structure and build momentum leading into the second half of the season." James Hibberd from Entertainment Weekly found it "one of the strongest season two episodes yet," Jace Lacob from Televisionary considered it "sensational," and Matt Richental from TV fanatic called it "another enjoyable, complex, involved Game of Thrones episode." IGN's Matt Fowler gave the episode an 8.5 out of 10, and at The A.V. Club David Sims gave it an A− and Emily VanDerWerff rated it B+.

"A central challenge of Game of Thrones is that it presented most of its central cast together, then scattered them to (more or less, as of now) a half-dozen different locations. Generally the series has done a remarkable job, even as it rushes through a lot of story, of making their threads feel connected, even when they’re not in each other's presence. Jon Snow and his men in black have felt like the most disconnected from the rest of the story this season: they're playing the show's long game, the existential threat of the White Walkers. (...) As rich as their story is in mystery and mythology–this week we get some information about the 'First Men' who colonized Westeros thousands of years ago–it can feel like watching a separate show within a show."

— James Poniewozik (Time)

One of VanDerWerff's criticisms of the episode is that it was too cluttered for her, treating important moments such as Renly's death in a matter of moments and moving away fast to the next thing. In her opinion this was because this was the first episode of the season to incorporate all the locations instead of omitting one or two. Elio Garcia of Westeros.org shared this view, saying that while many individual scenes were very good he missed a strong narrative thread connecting the multiple storylines.

Renly's death received many criticisms: David Sims wrote that Renly's death "came out of nowhere," Emily VanderWerff found it too rushed.

On the other hand, the exchange between Arya and Tywin was unanimously praised, both in terms of acting and direction. Writing for The Huffington Post, Maureen Ryan commended Maisie Williams for being able to hold her own in a scene with the charismatic Charles Dance. Another scene that was usually highlighted was Brienne's pledge of fealty to Catelyn Stark. Lacob described Christie's acting superlative, rendering a tragic air to Brienne, while VanDerWerff noted how Fairley's subtle performance with just a hint of tears and wavering voice made the scene almost a perfect one.

Other aspects that were praised by the reviewers were the production choice of filming in Iceland due to the magnificence and beauty of the shots, and good work done by the CGI team in making the dragon look like a real animal. Also, the reviewer Myles McNutt who coined the term "sexposition" to describe the use of sex in the show, noted that this was the first episode of the season that did not feature nudity.

In his ranking of the episodes of the series, Adam B. Vary of BuzzFeed criticized the episode, placing it at number 47 and citing "tedious setup" for his reasoning. Patrick Koch of WhatCulture was less critical, though he conceded that "the episode is pretty bare in terms of plot developments."

=== Awards and nominations ===
| Year | Award | Category | Nominee(s) | Result |
|---|---|---|---|---|
| 2012 | Portal Award | Best Episode | | Nominated |
| 2012 | Primetime Creative Arts Emmy Awards | Outstanding Art Direction for a Single-Camera Series | Gemma Jackson, Frank Walsh, and Tina Jones | Won |
| 2013 | ADG Excellence in Production Design Award | One-Hour Single Camera Television Series | Gemma Jackson | Won |
