= Martin Kenzie =

British cinematographer

- Born: 29 April 1956; Cambridge, England
- Died: 16 July 2012 (aged 56); Shepreth, England
- Occupations: Second unit director Cinematographer

Martin Kenzie (29 April 1956 – 16 July 2012) was a British second unit director and cinematographer whose works include feature films such as The Shining (1980), Return of the Jedi (1983), Aliens (1986), The King's Speech (2010) and TV series including Rome (2005) and Game of Thrones (2012). He was a member of the British Society of Cinematographers as a Camera Operator and was later elected a "Full Member of the Society" with BSC accreditation in 2012. Kenzie was diagnosed with cancer and was being operated on with the help of Macmillan Cancer Support. He died on 16 July 2012 at the age of 56. The Game of Thrones season three premiere episode, "Valar Dohaeris", aired on 31 March 2013, was dedicated to the memory of Kenzie in the credits.

== Personal life and career ==
Kenzie was born on 29 April 1956 in Cambridge, England and started his career as a production runner for a London-based TV Commercials Company named "Picture Palace Productions". Later he worked for the camera department at "Samuelson Film Services" while preparing motion picture cameras for hire. His first feature film work was for Stanley Kubrick's The Shining (1980) where he worked as an assistant cameraman with film's cinematographer John Alcott. Till 1984, Kenzie continued to work as a Second assistant camera on various films including Return of the Jedi (1983), Indiana Jones and the Temple of Doom (1984) and A Passage to India (1984).

Kenzie worked as First assistant camera on various other successful movies such as Robert Zemeckis' Who Framed Roger Rabbit (1988), Ron Howard's Willow (1988), Clint Eastwood's White Hunter Black Heart (1990), Francis Ford Coppola's The Godfather Part III (1990) and David Fincher's Alien 3 (1992). Since the beginning of his career, Kenzie made significant contributions as a Second unit director. Alongside feature films, Kenzie also worked for Television. His first work as a main unit cinematography which credited him as a cinematographer came in 1998 with David L. Williams's short film Angels at My Bedside and for a feature film in 2007 with Chris Munro's comedy film Back in Business.

For 2005's film Syriana, written and directed by Stephen Gaghan, Kenzie worked as an assistant director and contributed as cinematographer for various television series including Keen Eddie (2003–2004), Rome (2005), Game of Thrones (2012) and Playhouse Presents (2012). In 1998, Kenzie joined Associate Membership of the British Society of Cinematographers as a Camera Operator and with his progression as a Director of Photography, he was later elected a "Full Member of the Society" with BSC accreditation in 2012.

Kenzie was diagnosed with cancer and was being operated on with the help of Macmillan Cancer Support. He died on 16 July 2012 at the age of 56. British Society of Cinematographers announced a memorial service to celebrate Kenzie's life on 2 September 2012. The television series Game of Thrones dedicated its season three premiere episode, "Valar Dohaeris", aired on 31 March 2013, to the memory of Kenzie in the credits. Kenzie had worked as a cinematographer for the series for four of its episodes from second season; "Garden of Bones", "The Ghost of Harrenhal", "The Old Gods and the New", "A Man Without Honor"; and had done additional photography for two episodes; "Blackwater", "Valar Morghulis". Kenzie's work for the series was appreciated for its varied use of "subtle color palettes" based on the specific times and places of the story-line. After Kenzie's death, JustGiving started a fundraising campaign for him which would provide support for Cancer Research UK for the betterment of treatments for further patients.

== Awards ==
British Society of Cinematographers

- 1997 GBCT Operators Award – Hamlet
- 2001 GBCT Operators Award – Band of Brothers (Shared with Martin Hume)

Constellation Awards

- 2012 Best Technical Accomplishment in a 2012 Science Fiction Film or Television Production – Game of Thrones – Nominated

== Creative work ==
=== Feature films ===
Year	Name	Credited as	Notes
1980	The Shining	Assistant cameraman	–
1980	The Empire Strikes Back	Second assistant camera	Second unit director (Uncredited)
1981	Loophole	Second assistant camera	–
1981	For Your Eyes Only	Second assistant camera	Second unit director (Uncredited)
1982	Five Days One Summer	Second assistant camera	Second unit director
1983	Return of the Jedi	Second assistant camera	–
1983	Fanny Hill	Second assistant camera	–
1983	Never Say Never Again	Second assistant camera	Second unit director (Uncredited)
1983	Slayground	Second assistant camera	Second unit director
1984	Indiana Jones and the Temple of Doom	Second assistant camera: London	–
1984	A Passage to India	Clapper	–
1984	Santa Claus: The Movie	First assistant camera	Second camera (Uncredited)
1985	Spies Like Us	First assistant camera, Second camera	–
1985	The Color Purple	Focus puller, Kenya	–
1985	Revolution	First assistant camera, Second camera	–
1985	Club Paradise	First assistant camera, Second camera	–
1986	Aliens	Camera focus	–
1987	Superman IV: The Quest for Peace	First assistant camera	–
1987	Willow	First assistant camera	–
1988	Who Framed Roger Rabbit	Focus puller, UK	–
1988	The Dawning	First assistant camera	–
1988	Distant Voices, Still Lives	Focus puller for Stunts	–
1989	Indiana Jones and the Last Crusade	Assistant cameraman	–
1989	Great Balls of Fire!	Focus puller, UK	–
1989	A Dry White Season	First assistant camera: Second camera	–
1990	White Hunter Black Heart	Focus puller	–
1990	Three Men and a Little Lady	First assistant camera	–
1990	The Godfather Part III	First assistant camera: Italy	(Uncredited)
1992	The Power of One	Camera operator	–
1992	Alien 3	First assistant camera	–
1992	1492: Conquest of Paradise	Camera operator	–
1993	Shadowlands	Camera operator	Second unit director
1995	Othello	Camera operator	–
1996	Muppet Treasure Island	Camera operator	Second unit director
1996	The Ogre	Camera operator	–
1996	Hamlet	Camera operator	–
1997	Seven Years in Tibet	Camera operator	–
1997	Incognito	Camera operator	–
1997	Tomorrow Never Dies	Camera operator	–
1998	The Avengers	Camera operator	Car chase unit (Uncredited)
1999	Everybody Loves Sunshine	Camera operator	–
1999	An Ideal Husband	Camera operator	–
1999	The World Is Not Enough	Additional photographer	–
2000	Vatel	Camera operator	–
2001	Girl from Rio	Camera operator	–
2001	Black Hawk Down	Camera operator	–
2002	The Four Feathers	Camera operator	–
2004	Wimbledon	Second unit director	–
2004	The Phantom of the Opera	Additional Cinematographer	Second unit director
2005	The River King	Director of photography	UK unit
2005	Syriana	Assistant Director: Second aerial unit	–
2006	Alex Rider: Operation Stormbreaker	Second unit director	–
2006	Amazing Grace	Second unit director	–
2007	Back in Business	Cinematographer	–
2007	St. Trinian's	Second unit director	–
2008	Easy Virtue	Cinematographer	–
2008	Mamma Mia!	Camera operator	–
2008	Wild Child	Second unit director	–
2008	Babylon A.D.	Second unit director	Brooklyn square
2009	The Boat That Rocked	Second unit director	–
2009	Dorian Gray	Second unit director	–
2009	Creation	Second unit director	–
2010	Clash of the Titans	Second unit director	–
2010	The King's Speech	Second unit director	–
2011	Hanna	Second unit director	–
2011	Johnny English Reborn	Second unit director	–
2011	The Iron Lady	Camera operator: Second unit Second unit director	–

=== Television films/series ===
Year	Name	Credited as	Notes
1981	Very Like a Whale	Second assistant camera	TV movie
1983	Philip Marlowe, Private Eye	Second assistant camera	TV series
1984	The Zany Adventures of Robin Hood	Second assistant camera	TV movie
1989	Living with Dinosaurs	First assistant camera	TV movie
1989	Monster Maker	First assistant camera	TV movie
1995	The Big One	Camera operator	TV movie
1998	Angels at My Bedside	Cinematographer	–
2001	Band of Brothers	Camera operator	TV mini-series
2002–03	Dinotopia	Cinematographer	12 episodes: 1. "Making Good" (28 November 2002); 2. "Marooned" (28 November 2002); 3. "Handful" of Dust (5 December 2002); 4. "Contact" (12 December 2002); 5. "The Matriarch" (19 December 2002); 6. "The Big Fight" (26 December 2002); 7. "Lost and Found" (6 July 2003); 8. "LeSage" (13 July 2003); 9. "Car Wars" (20 July 2003); 10. "Night of the Wartosa" (27 July 2003); 11. "The Cure: Part 1" (3 August 2003); 12. "The Cure: Part 2" (10 August 2003)
2003–04	Keen Eddie	Cinematographer	12 episodes: 1. "Horse Heir" (10 June 2003); 2. "Achtung, Baby" (17 June 2003); 3. "Eddie Loves Baseball" (24 June 2003); 4. "Sucker Punch" (1 July 2003); 5. "The Amazing Larry Dunn" (8 July 2003); 6. "Black Like Me" (24 July 2003); 7. "Sticky Fingers" (27 January 2004); 8. "Inciting Incident" (17 February 2004); 9. "Citizen Cecil" (2 March 2004); 10. "Who Wants to Be in a Club That Would Have Me as a Member?" (24 March 2004); 11. "Keeping Up Appearances" (7 April 2004); 12. "Liberté, Egalité, Fraternité" (14 April 2004)
2004	Road to Damascus	Cinematographer	Short film
2005	Rome	Cinematographer	4 episodes: 1. "The Stolen Eagle" (28 August 2005); 2. "How Titus Pullo Brought Down the Republic" (4 September 2005); 3. "An Owl in a Thornbush" (11 September 2005); 4. "Caesarion" (16 October 2005)
2005	Colditz	Second unit director	TV movie
2006	The Official Film of the 2006 FIFA World Cup	Cinematographer	Video documentary
2010	The Special Relationship	Additional photography, London	TV movie
2011	George Harrison: Living in the Material World	Cinematographer	Video documentary
2012	Game of Thrones	Cinematographer	4 episodes: 1. "Garden of Bones" (22 April 2012); 2. "The Ghost of Harrenhal" (29 April 2012); 3. "The Old Gods and the New" (6 May 2012); 4. "A Man Without Honor" (13 May 2012)
2012	Game of Thrones	Additional photography	2 episodes: 1. "Blackwater" (27 May 2012); 2. "Valar Morghulis" (3 June 2012)
2012	Playhouse Presents	Cinematographer	2 episodes: 1. "City Hall" (12 May 2012); 2. "The Other Woman" (14 June 2012)
