= Garden of Bones =

- Game of Thrones episode
- Episode no.: Season 2 Episode 4
- Directed by: David Petrarca
- Written by: Vanessa Taylor
- Cinematography by: Martin Kenzie
- Editing by: Katie Weiland
- Original air date: April 22, 2012
- Running time: 50 minutes

Guest appearances
- Gethin Anthony as Renly Baratheon; Nicholas Blane as the Spice King; Slavko Juraga as the Silk King; Nonso Anozie as Xaro Xhoan Daxos; Michael McElhatton as Roose Bolton; Joe Dempsie as Gendry; Eugene Simon as Lancel Lannister; Oona Chaplin as Talisa Mygaer; Gwendoline Christie as Brienne of Tarth; Ian Hanmore as Pyat Pree; Roxanne McKee as Doreah; Amrita Acharia as Irri; Steven Cole as Kovarro; Ben Hawkey as Hot Pie; Finn Jones as Loras Tyrell; Esmé Bianco as Ros; Ian Whyte as Ser Gregor Clegane; Ian Beattie as Ser Meryn Trant; Tony Way as Dontos Hollard; Andy Kellegher as Polliver

Episode chronology
← Previous "What Is Dead May Never Die"	Next → "The Ghost of Harrenhal"
- Game of Thrones season 2

"Garden of Bones" is the fourth episode of the second season of HBO's medieval fantasy television series Game of Thrones, and the 14th overall. The episode was directed by David Petrarca, his directorial debut for the series, and was written by Vanessa Taylor. It first aired on April 22, 2012.

The episode's title comes from a phrase used by Ser Jorah Mormont to describe the desert surrounding the city of Qarth to Daenerys Targaryen. It received acclaim from critics, who praised the performances of Peter Dinklage and Michelle Fairley, as well as the episode's more dark and violent tone. At the 64th Primetime Emmy Awards, the episode won the award for Outstanding Art Direction for a Single-Camera Series, sharing the distinction with "The Ghost of Harrenhal" and "A Man Without Honor".

== Plot ==
=== At Oxcross ===
Robb defeats Lannister reinforcements in a night-time attack on the town of Oxcross in the Westerlands. His bannerman Lord Roose Bolton suggests flaying and interrogating the prisoners, but Robb insists on fair treatment. Robb encounters field nurse Talisa, and is impressed by her.

=== In King's Landing ===
After hearing of Robb's victory, Joffrey orders Sansa Stark be publicly beaten, but Tyrion and Bronn defuse the situation. At Bronn's suggestion, Tyrion sends prostitutes Ros and Daisy to Joffrey, who forces Ros to beat Daisy as a message to Tyrion.

Lancel informs Tyrion that Cersei has ordered Pycelle's release. Tyrion tells Lancel that he is aware of his affair with Cersei, but will keep the truth from Joffrey in exchange for Lancel spying on Cersei.

=== At Harrenhal ===
Arya, Gendry, and Hot Pie are brought to the ruined castle Harrenhal, where the Lannister garrison, commanded by the Mountain, tortures and kills prisoners for information concerning "the Brotherhood". Tywin arrives, ending the brutality and ordering the prisoners be put to work. Polliver threatens Arya but she is spared by Tywin, who recognizes she is a girl and makes her his cupbearer.

=== Outside Qarth ===
Daenerys receives word from Kovarro that the nearby city of Qarth welcomes the "Mother of Dragons". Daenerys asks Jorah what he knows of Qarth but he only knows that it is surrounded by a desert known as the "Garden of Bones" and that every time they shut the gates on a traveler, "the garden grows".

Daenerys and her khalasar meet with Qarth's rulers, the Thirteen, outside the city. The Thirteen ask to see Daenerys's dragons in exchange for shelter. She asks that her people are attended to first, but the Thirteen abandon them to the desert. Daenerys swears vengeance should they not grant them shelter, and one of the Thirteen, Xaro Xhoan Daxos, vouches for Daenerys's people through a blood oath, and they are reluctantly allowed inside.

=== In the Stormlands ===
Littlefinger discusses the siege of King's Landing with Renly, and Margaery rebuffs Littlefinger's questions. Littlefinger meets with Catelyn, who is enraged at the sight of him, and tells her the Lannisters want to trade Sansa and Arya for Jaime. As a gesture of goodwill, he brings her Ned's remains.

Renly and Catelyn parley with Stannis and Melisandre. Renly refuses Stannis's offer to surrender in exchange for becoming his heir, and is given until sunrise to reconsider or be destroyed.

At night, Stannis orders Davos to take Melisandre ashore in secret. Once ashore, Melisandre reveals she is, impossibly, in late-stage pregnancy and gives birth to a horrific, shadowy figure, which disappears in a cloud of smoke.

== Production ==
=== Writing ===
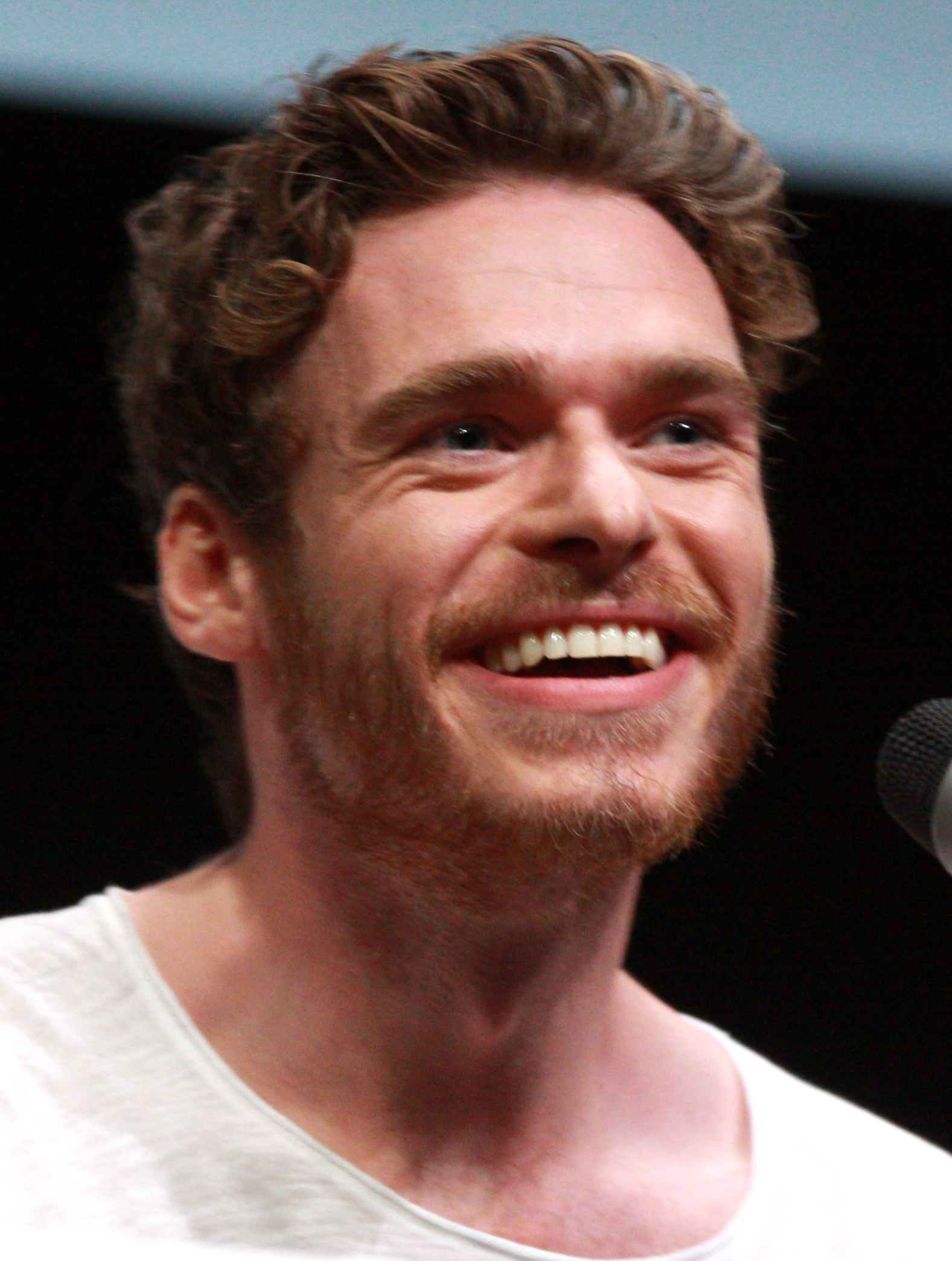
Richard Madden's performances in the first season convinced the writers to expand Robb's storyline and show his campaign in the West.

"Garden of Bones" was the first of two episodes written by Vanessa Taylor, the season's addition to the writing staff. The teleplay adapted material from chapters 27, 30, 32, 33 and 43 (Arya VI, Tyrion VII, Catelyn III, Sansa III, and Davos II) of George R. R. Martin's novel A Clash of Kings.

The episode introduced many significant deviations from the original material. One of the most significant affects the character of Talisa, who is based on the novel's Jeyne Westerling, but is given a very different background and motivations (in the books she is the daughter of a minor noble sworn to the Lannisters, while the show has her a foreign lady from the Free City of Volantis). The producers acknowledge that Robb's storyline is "one of the places where novels diverge pretty drastically from television." They felt that the book's approach of having him off-scene most of the time and portraying his deeds in the battlefield only from second-hand reports was not going to work in a visual medium. Also, the talent and magnetism that Richard Madden demonstrated during the first season convinced them to expand his presence and portray his love story onscreen.

Other deviations include the early arrival of Littlefinger to the Tyrell army and his interactions with Catelyn (in the books he arrives much later, after she has left), the merger of Melisandre's two shadow creatures into a single one (the Siege of Storm's End and the character of Ser Cortnay Penrose were dropped from the show) and having Tywin discover Arya's gender and make her his cupbearer (in the books Arya abandons her identity as a boy and is assigned to work in the kitchens). Also, several scenes were created for the episode, including a scene with a sadistic Joffrey and prostitutes and one in which Daenerys is received at the gates of Qarth.

=== Casting ===
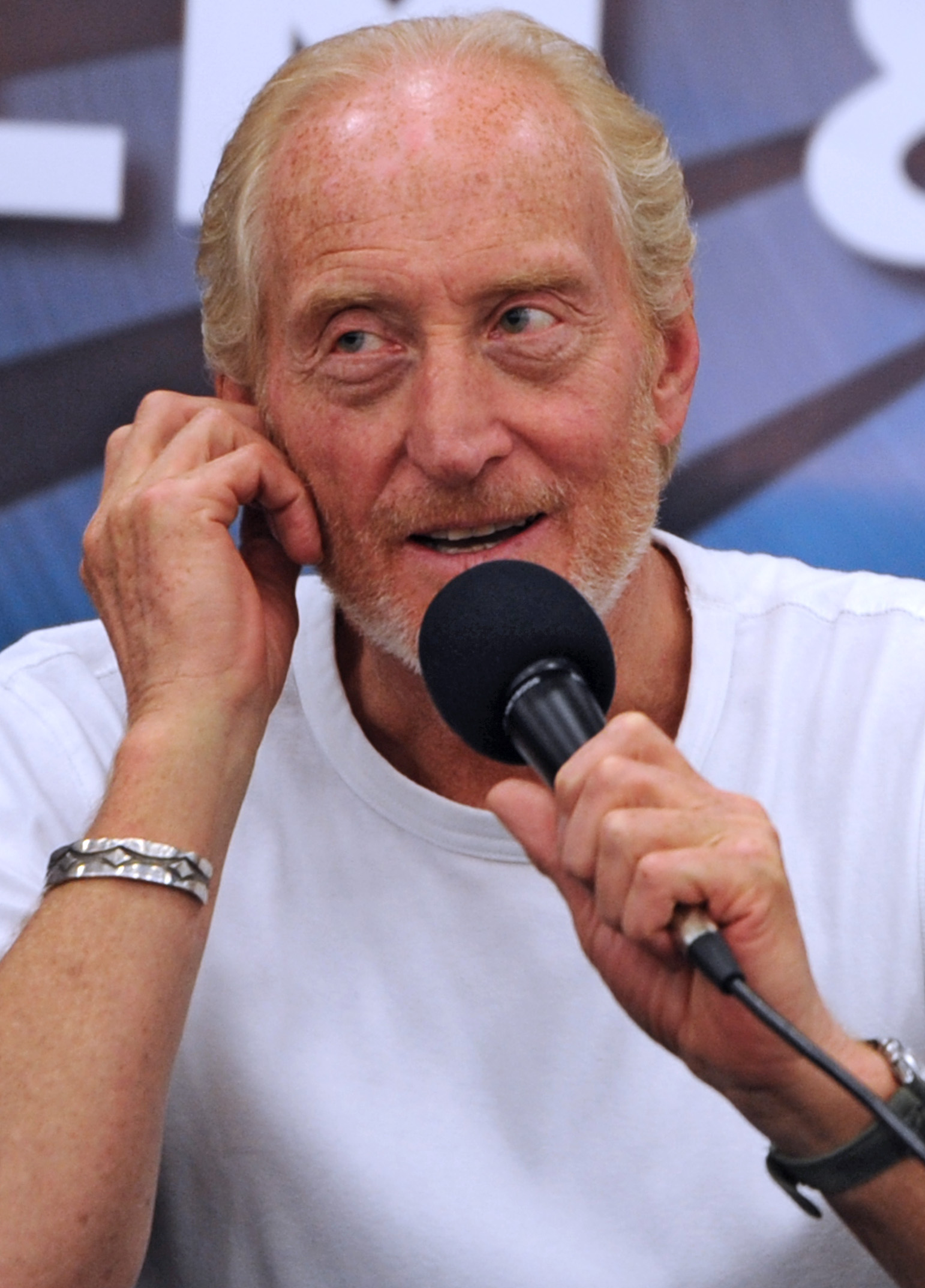
Charles Dance returns in "Garden of Bones" and is promoted to the main cast.

This episode marks the first appearance of the recurring actress Oona Chaplin. When the casting was announced in August 2011, HBO only credited the character "Jeyne", refusing to give any surname. Since there were several characters in the books with that name, this led to speculation about whom Chaplin would be playing. Eventually it was revealed that the character was based in Jeyne Westerling, and by the time the shooting began, she was renamed Talisa Maegyr. However, Jeyne Westerling and Talisa Maegyr are entirely different characters. In the novels, Jeyne is a member of the noble House Westerling, whose lands are located in the Westerlands. On a mission to take their castle, Robb finds out what Theon has done to his brothers, and Jeyne "comforts" him in his grief. Robb, not wanting to be dishonourable, marries her. Talisa, on the other hand, is a healer from the Eastern city of Volantis, whom Robb meets on the battlefield. Additionally, Jeyne is not introduced until the third book in the series, A Storm of Swords, while Talisa is introduced in this season (roughly adapted from the series' second book, A Clash of Kings). Chaplin has read the original books and was already a big fan of the show before being cast.

The new setting of Qarth is also introduced and with it three roles cast among The Thirteen, the governing body of the city:

- Xaro Xhoan Daxos played by Nonso Anozie. In the books, Xaro is a native of Qarth and is white, but in the series Xaro is an immigrant from the Summer Isles and is black. Many other traits of the original character, such as his homosexuality and constant crying, have been removed in the adaptation. Anozie revealed that he had auditioned for another role for season one, and HBO wanted to cast him, but a schedule conflict prevented him from appearing.
- The Spice King played by Nicholas Blane. The character has been created for the show, but he embodies the book's Ancient Guild of Spicers, one of the merchant factions that rival Xaro Xhoan Daxos.
- Pyat Pree played by Ian Hanmore, who has no lines in this episode but is present in the reception at the gates.

Charles Dance returns as Tywin Lannister and is added to the main cast list and included in the opening credits (he had been a recurring guest star during the first season). The episode marks the first appearance of Ian Whyte as Gregor Clegane. Clegane had been previously played by Conan Stevens in season one. Whyte had previously played the White Walker seen in the first episode, as well as in the second-season episode "The Night Lands". Though Whyte did not return as Gregor for season four (the role was taken over by Icelandic weightlifter Hafþór Júlíus Björnsson), he played the giant Wun Wun in the season five episodes "Hardhome" and "The Dance of Dragons".

=== Filming locations ===
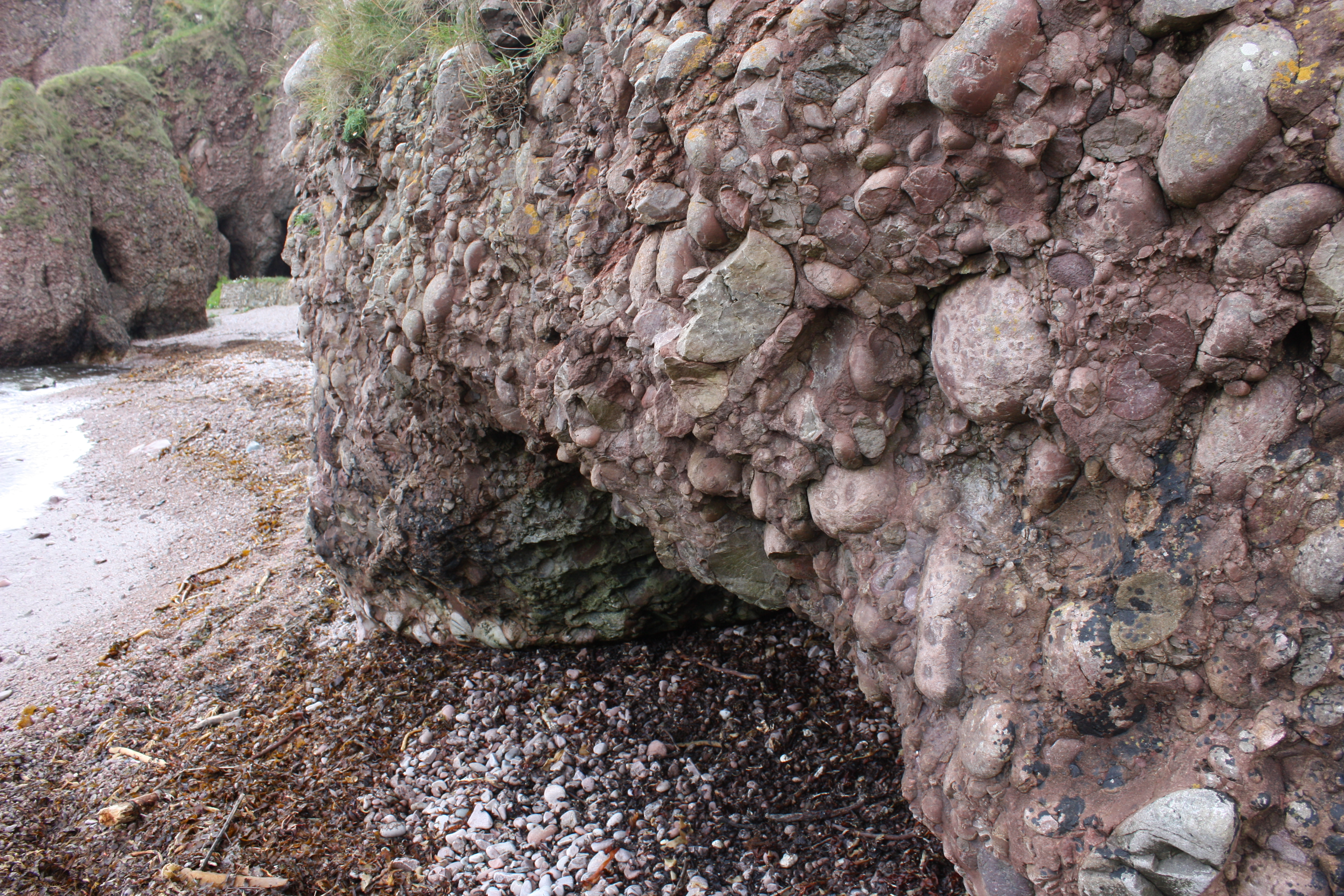
The closing scene of the episode was filmed at the Cushendun Caves.

Production for "Garden of Bones" continued to use Belfast's The Paint Hall Studios for all interior shots and the set constructed at the Larrybane Bay for the scenes at Renly's camp.

The episode also introduced numerous external locations: the gates of Qarth were constructed in Dubac quarry near Dubrovnik, on cliffs over the Adriatic Sea; the scenes in the caves below Renly's camp were filmed at the Cushendun Caves, County Antrim; and the set representing the huge ruined castle of Harrenhal was built near Banbridge, County Down.

=== Staging and props ===
The closing scene with Melisandre birthing the shadow creature was shot at night, in a real cave and in cold weather. The scene was very taxing for actress Carice van Houten, who had to be naked and scream loudly during the labour. For this reason, the scene could not be rehearsed before filming. To make van Houten appear pregnant the show's prosthetic artist Conor O'Sullivan prepared a fake belly that could be operated by pneumatics to simulate the childbirth. The creature was added using CGI.

Maisie Dee, the pornographic actress who played the abused prostitute Daisy, described her experience with Game of Thrones on her blog. She wrote that her character was unnamed during the shooting of her first scene (her trailer was labeled "Nubile Whore") but graduated to having a name later. The scene of her abuse at Joffrey's orders took a day to shoot, using alternately a real leather belt and a soft prop to depict Daisy being whipped by Ros.

== Reception ==
=== Ratings ===
The number of viewers of the first airing remained steady for the fourth week in a row, reaching 3.7 million viewers. In the United Kingdom, the episode was seen by 0.8 million viewers on Sky Atlantic, being the channel's highest-rated broadcast that week.

=== Critical reception ===
"Garden of Bones" received critical acclaim from most commentators. On the review aggregator website Rotten Tomatoes, 97% of 30 critics' reviews are positive, with an average rating of 9.4/10. The website's consensus reads: "'Garden of Bones' continues GoT's stellar second season with a bleak, disturbing, and powerful episode that culminates in a bizarre confirmation that the night is indeed dark and full of terrors." IGN's Matt Fowler gave it a 9 out of 10, calling it "a ferocious treat, overloaded with misery, torture and a total 'WTF!' black magic-fueled ending". Both David Sims and Emily VanDerWerff, two reviewers from The A.V. Club, rated it with a B+. TV Fanatic's Matt Richenthal also considered it the best of the season but was worried about the ending and how magic would be dealt with in the show.

There was consensus in considering the episode the most violent and gruesome to date. Writing for The Guardian, Sarah Hughes summed it up: "This was an exceptionally violent episode. It featured: one death by Direwolf; one graphic foot amputation; two separate uses of a crossbow as a weapon of intimidation; the continued humiliation of Sansa, stripped and beaten on Joffrey's orders; the brutal whipping of a whore again at Joffrey's command; two torture scenes (one of which was interrupted); a couple of backhanders; several dead bodies and one (slightly camp) Qartheen blood oath."

Many commentators praised the acting in this episode, highlighting Michelle Fairley in the scene where Catelyn receives her late husband's bones and Peter Dinklage when Tyrion confronts his cousin Lancel. On Talisa's introduction, Myles McNutt at Cultural Learnings wrote: "The problem is that I’m pretty sure any viewer who watched this would know immediately that she is intended as Robb’s love interest, and there’s a simplicity to that which I object to."

=== Accolades ===
This episode won the Primetime Emmy Award for Outstanding Art Direction for a Single-Camera Series.
