= Year of the Rat (play) =

Year of the Rat is a play by Roy Smiles about a (fictional) encounter between George Orwell, Cyril Connolly and Sonia Brownell on the island of Jura. Connolly and Brownell were working on Horizon at the time Orwell was on Jura, in bad health, writing Nineteen Eighty-Four.

In the 2008 staging at the West Yorkshire Playhouse, Hugo Speer played Orwell, Claudia Elmhirst played Sonia Brownell, and Nicholas Blane, Cyril Connolly.

Both men pursue Brownell, who is sorrowing over a failed love affair ( with the writer Maurice Merleau-Ponty). Connolly shared memories with Orwell of prep school, Eton and the Spanish Civil War. Orwell was working out his anger at the Communist purges under Joseph Stalin, and the iniquities of his time. 'Rat' ( a sort of agony aunt), 'Pig' (Stalinism), and Boxer ( the working classes), punctuate the action.

The play ends after Orwell has died, with Sonia packing up his books and wanting to know more.
