= Game of Thrones season 2 =

Game of Thrones
- Season 2
- Region 1 DVD artwork
- Showrunners: David Benioff; D. B. Weiss
- Starring: Peter Dinklage; Lena Headey; Nikolaj Coster-Waldau; Michelle Fairley; Emilia Clarke; Aidan Gillen; Iain Glen; Kit Harington; Liam Cunningham; Isaac Hempstead Wright; Richard Madden; Sophie Turner; Maisie Williams; Alfie Allen; John Bradley; Jack Gleeson; Rory McCann; Stephen Dillane; Carice van Houten; James Cosmo; Jerome Flynn; Conleth Hill; Sibel Kekilli; Natalie Dormer; Charles Dance; Jason Momoa
- No. of episodes: 10

Release
- Original network: HBO
- Original release: April 1 – June 3, 2012

Season chronology
- ← Previous; Season 1 Next → Season 3

The second season of the fantasy drama television series Game of Thrones premiered in the United States on HBO on April 1, 2012, and concluded on June 3, 2012. It consists of 10 episodes, each running approximately 50–60 minutes. The season mostly covers the events of A Clash of Kings, the second novel of the A Song of Ice and Fire series by George R. R. Martin, adapted for television by David Benioff and D. B. Weiss. HBO ordered the second season on April 19, 2011, and filming began in July 2011, primarily in Ireland, Northern Ireland, Croatia, and Iceland.

The story takes place in a fantasy world, primarily on a fictional continent called Westeros, with one storyline occurring on another continent to the east, Essos. Like the novel, the season follows the aftermath of Eddard "Ned" Stark's dramatic death and the political turmoil that comes with it. The season mainly centers on the War of the Five Kings, fought among the leaders of Westerosi factions who are either staking a claim to the Iron Throne or seeking independence from it. Cersei Lannister, the widow of the late King Robert Baratheon, stays in the capital as queen regent, while her son Joffrey rules as King of the Seven Kingdoms. Cersei's twin brother, Jaime Lannister, is Robb Stark's prisoner, and her other brother, the dwarf Tyrion, serves as acting Hand of the King to Joffrey until the siblings' father, Tywin Lannister, returns to help defend the capital. In the North, Jon Snow and the Night's Watch stay with a reluctant ally during an expedition beyond the Wall. Meanwhile, in Essos, with three newborn dragons by her side, Daenerys Targaryen attempts to find allies and resources to help her fulfill her perceived destiny to win the Iron Throne.

Game of Thrones features a large ensemble cast, including Peter Dinklage, Lena Headey, Nikolaj Coster-Waldau, Michelle Fairley and Emilia Clarke. The season introduced a number of new cast members, including Stephen Dillane, Natalie Dormer, Carice van Houten and Liam Cunningham.

Critics praised the show's production values, cast, and music. Viewership rose compared with the previous season. The second season won six of the twelve Emmy Awards for which it was nominated. It received a nomination for Outstanding Supporting Actor in a Drama Series (Peter Dinklage) and Outstanding Drama Series. U.S. viewership rose by approximately 8% over the course of the season, from 3.9 million to 4.2 million by the season finale.

== Episodes ==
| No. overall | No. in season | Title | Directed by | Written by | Original release date | U.S. viewers (millions) |
|---|---|---|---|---|---|---|
| 11 | 1 | "The North Remembers" | Alan Taylor | David Benioff & D. B. Weiss | April 1, 2012 | 3.86 |
In King's Landing, Tyrion Lannister becomes acting Hand of the King, much to the dismay of his sister, Cersei. At Dragonstone, Stannis Baratheon proclaims allegiance to the priestess Melisandre's God of Light, R'hllor, and claims the Iron Throne, having revealed Joffrey Baratheon's bastardy. Joffrey orders all of former king Robert Baratheon's bastards slaughtered. One of them, Gendry, along with the disguised Arya Stark, has escaped the city and is being taken to Castle Black. Having won three victories, Robb Stark, now proclaimed the King of the North, offers the Lannisters peace in exchange for the North's independence and Sansa Stark's and Arya's safe return. He sends Theon Greyjoy to gain Balon Greyjoy's support, and Catelyn Stark to seek an alliance with Renly Baratheon, who also claims the Crown. Beyond the Wall, the Night's Watch shelters with Craster and his daughter-wives. In Essos, as her people slowly die in the Red Waste, Daenerys Targaryen dispatches three riders to conduct reconnaissance.
| 12 | 2 | "The Night Lands" | Alan Taylor | David Benioff & D. B. Weiss | April 8, 2012 | 3.76 |
Returning to Pyke Island after nine years as the Starks' ward, Theon is reunited with his sister, Yara, and his father, Balon, who despises Theon's acquired Northern ways. Balon rejects Robb's proposed alliance and plans to reclaim Iron Island's independence by force. In King's Landing, Cersei rejects Robb's peace terms, while Tyrion exiles the untrustworthy Janos Slynt, head of the Gold Cloaks, to the Night's Watch and promotes Bronn in his place. En route to Castle Black, Arya, impersonating a boy, reveals her true identity to Gendry. At Craster's Keep, north of the Wall, Samwell Tarly is approached by Gilly, one of Craster's daughters. Gilly fears for her unborn child if it is a boy; Jon Snow resists helping, despite Sam's pleas. In the Red Waste, a horse returns to Daenerys's camp with its rider's severed head in a pouch, a message from her enemies. In Dragonstone, former smuggler Ser Davos Seaworth, who now serves Stannis, recruits the pirate Salladhor Saan and his fleet to Stannis's side. Stannis attempts to sire a male heir with Melisandre, as his wife, Selyse, has failed to produce a son. Jon discovers that Craster sacrifices his sons to the White Walkers; Craster catches him spying and knocks Jon unconscious.
| 13 | 3 | "What Is Dead May Never Die" | Alik Sakharov | Bryan Cogman | April 15, 2012 | 3.77 |
Catelyn arrives at Renly's camp to negotiate an alliance. A female warrior called Brienne of Tarth wins the right to join Renly's Kingsguard by defeating Loras Tyrell in a practice duel. Renly has recently wed Margaery Tyrell, Loras's sister. Renly avoids consummating his and Margaery's marriage due to his homosexuality and sexual relationship with Loras. In the Iron Islands, Balon plans an attack on the North, led by Yara. Conflicted, Theon burns his letter to Robb warning of Balon's impending attack and affirms his allegiance to House Greyjoy in a water-based ceremony to the Drowned God. In King's Landing, Tyrion imprisons Maester Pycelle after determining he is Cersei's informant. Tyrion appoints his lover, Shae, as Sansa's handmaiden, both to protect Shae and watch Sansa. Beyond the Wall, Craster demands the Night's Watchmen leave. Jon discovers that Lord Commander Jeor Mormont has always known about and ignored Craster's human sacrifices. On the road to the Wall, the Night's Watch recruits are attacked by Lannister soldiers searching for Gendry. Yoren is killed, and Arya and Gendry are taken prisoner. To protect Gendry, Arya falsely states that a boy the soldiers have killed, Lommy, was Gendry.
| 14 | 4 | "Garden of Bones" | David Petrarca | Vanessa Taylor | April 22, 2012 | 3.65 |
Robb's army attacks a Lannister army at Oxcross and claims another victory, meeting a healer girl named Talisa Maegyr in the aftermath. In response, Joffrey publicly abuses Sansa as revenge for Robb's victories until Tyrion intervenes. The dwarf sends two prostitutes to the young King to calm his temper, but Joffrey makes one of them beat the other brutally, thus threatening Tyrion not to interfere with his business. Catelyn attempts to unite the Baratheon brothers against the Lannisters, but Stannis demands Renly's loyalty to him as king. Petyr "Littlefinger" Baelish visits Catelyn and relays Tyrion's offer to exchange Jaime for her daughters. Davos witnesses Melisandre giving birth to a shadow creature. Tyrion releases Pycelle and dismisses him from the Small Council. When Tyrion discovers Cersei's incestuous relationship with their cousin Lancel, he blackmails Lancel into spying on Cersei, threatening to reveal the relationship to Joffrey. Arya and Gendry are taken to Harrenhal castle as captives. Prisoners are systematically tortured to death until Tywin arrives and demands they be used as labor. Impressed by Arya's feistiness, Tywin makes her his personal cupbearer without deducing her true identity. After an exhausting journey through the desert, Daenerys arrives at the prosperous city of Qarth. Xaro Xhoan Daxos, a member of the Council of Thirteen, persuades fellow council members to allow Daenerys and her retinue to enter the city.
| 15 | 5 | "The Ghost of Harrenhal" | David Petrarca | David Benioff & D. B. Weiss | April 29, 2012 | 3.90 |
At Harrenhal, Jaqen H'ghar, a Faceless Man, assassin, and one of three caged prisoners Arya previously saved from a fire, pledges to kill any three people she chooses to repay his debt to her. Her first choice is "the Tickler", the man who mortally tortures the captives. Renly is killed by Melisandre's shadowy assassin. Brienne is accused of the murder, and Catelyn forces her to flee the camp. Excluding the Tyrells, Renly's forces join Stannis. Brienne swears lifelong fealty to Catelyn for having saved her life. Theon sails from Pyke, and against Yara's orders, intends to prove he is a true Ironborn by capturing Winterfell during Robb's absence. Lancel tells Tyrion about wildfire, a mass-produced explosive substance hidden in the city's dungeons and intended to destroy Stannis's fleet and army during the impending siege. Tyrion then takes control of the scheme. In the North, the Night's Watch arrives at an ancient fortress called the Fist of the First Men. Jeor Mormont hands command of Jon over to legendary ranger Qhorin Halfhand, who is leading a team to the Frostfang mountains to spy on the gathering wildling host. In Qarth, Xaro proposes marriage to Daenerys in exchange for providing her with his wealth to conquer the Seven Kingdoms. Ser Jorah Mormont convinces her to gain the Westerosi peoples' support instead.
| 16 | 6 | "The Old Gods and the New" | David Nutter | Vanessa Taylor | May 6, 2012 | 3.88 |
Against Cersei's wishes, Tyrion sends her and Jaime's daughter, Myrcella Baratheon, to Dorne to secure a marriage alliance with House Martell. Theon captures Winterfell and executes Ser Rodrik Cassel. Osha, a captive wildling, along with Hodor, helps Bran and Rickon Stark escape. In the aftermath of another battle, Robb reunites with Talisa. Jon captures a wildling named Ygritte but is separated from Qhorin's group while pursuing her after she escapes. Joffrey's mistreatment of the starving common folk incites a riot at King's Landing, in which he is nearly killed, and Sandor "the Hound" Clegane saves Sansa from being raped. Littlefinger works to broker an alliance between Tywin and House Tyrell. At Harrenhal, Arya has Jaqen kill Amory Lorch when he discovers her spying on the Lannister battle plans. Robb receives news about Theon's treachery and sends men to retake Winterfell. At Qarth, Daenerys works to procure a ship to transport an army to Westeros while keeping Xaro at bay. One of Daenerys's maids, Irri, is killed, and her dragons are stolen.
| 17 | 7 | "A Man Without Honor" | David Nutter | David Benioff & D. B. Weiss | May 13, 2012 | 3.69 |
Theon and his men pursue Bran and Rickon. Tywin launches an investigation into Amory's assassination. Jon recaptures Ygritte, but she escapes again, leading him into a trap. Still shaken from the riot, Sansa is horrified that she has begun menstruating and is now old enough to marry and bear Joffrey's children. Cersei advises her to love no one but her children, not even Joffrey. In Robb's camp, Jaime's failed escape leaves a guard dead and some soldiers seeking retribution. In Qarth, the warlock Pyat Pree says he stole Daenerys's dragons; he offers her the opportunity to reunite with them, then slaughters the Council of Thirteen and establishes Xaro as king. In Winterfell, Theon presents the charred corpses of two farm boys to Maester Luwin, claiming they are Bran and Rickon.
| 18 | 8 | "The Prince of Winterfell" | Alan Taylor | David Benioff & D. B. Weiss | May 20, 2012 | 3.86 |
Robb learns that Catelyn secretly freed Jaime Lannister, who Brienne is escorting to King's Landing to exchange for Sansa and Arya. Robb places his mother under house arrest and sends men to recapture Jaime. Yara arrives at Winterfell and criticizes Theon's seizing it, as he will not receive reinforcements to hold it. He refuses to return to Pyke with her. When Tywin leaves Harrenhal to attack Robb, Arya coerces Jaqen into helping her, Gendry, and their friend, Hot Pie, to escape. In King's Landing, Cersei gets revenge on Tyrion for sending Myrcella to Dorne by abducting Ros, whom she mistakenly believes is his secret lover. Joffrey chastises Varys for not having more knowledge of Stark positions, and prepares to lead the attack against Stannis himself. En route to King's Landing, Stannis promises to make Davos his Hand of the King. Beyond the Wall, a wildling leader called "Rattleshirt" leads the captured Jon and Halfhand to his king, Mance Rayder. At the Fist of the First Men, the brothers of the Night's Watch find a hidden cache of dragonglass weapons. In Qarth, Jorah agrees to accompany Daenerys to the House of the Undying to retrieve her dragons. Bran and Rickon are revealed to be alive and hiding in the Winterfell crypts.
| 19 | 9 | "Blackwater" | Neil Marshall | George R. R. Martin | May 27, 2012 | 3.38 |
Stannis's fleet assaults King's Landing. Sansa plays along, trying to manipulate Joffrey into leading the attack himself (hoping to get him killed), but Joffrey proves too afraid to fight. Leading the defense, Tyrion destroys most of Stannis's fleet with wildfire, including Davos's ship; however, a significant force still manages to attack the castle. The Hound, overcome by his fear of fire, denounces Joffrey and deserts the battlefield. Joffrey retreats in fear as Tyrion rallies the Gold Cloaks into fighting with him. Stannis's forces enter the castle, but Tyrion leads his men behind them and mounts a rearguard attack. Cersei goes to the throne room with Tommen, intending to commit suicide rather than be captured. Tyrion is betrayed and wounded by one of the Kingsguard, Mandon Moore, but saved by his squire, Podrick. The Hound offers to take Sansa to Winterfell, but she is still scared of him and refuses. Tywin and Loras arrive with a combined Lannister–Tyrell army at the last minute to save the city, but Stannis escapes.
| 20 | 10 | "Valar Morghulis" | Alan Taylor | David Benioff & D. B. Weiss | June 3, 2012 | 4.20 |
Joffrey sets Sansa aside to marry Margaery Tyrell and ally with the Tyrell house. Tyrion recovers from his wounds and fears that Cersei tried to have him killed. Melisandre comforts a defeated Stannis by showing his future glory in the flames. Brienne kills Stark soldiers after they recognize Jaime. Against Catelyn's advice, Robb marries Talisa, breaking his promise to wed Walder Frey's daughter. In Qarth, inside the House of the Undying, Daenerys enters a simulacrum of a destroyed Iron Throne room, then is reunited with what appears to be Khal Drogo and their infant son. Knowing it is an illusion, she leaves and successfully retrieves her dragons, who burn the House to the ground, killing Pyat. She seals Xaro and her traitorous servant Doreah inside his empty vault, claims his wealth, and purchases a ship to leave Qarth. In Winterfell, Theon's men betray him and hand him over to the besieging Northmen in exchange for passage for themselves back to the Iron Islands. Winterfell is torched. Fatally wounded, Maester Luwin convinces Osha to take Bran and Rickon to the Wall to seek protection from Jon. After Arya, Hot Pie, and Gendry escape Harrenhal, Jaqen gives Arya a coin he says can be used to find him in Braavos. Before she does, he magically changes his face and departs. North of the Wall, Qhorin Halfhand forces Jon to kill him and pretend to join the wildlings so that he can spy on them. An army of White Walkers and dead men surrounds the Fist of the First Men; Sam hides, watching in horror as they pass.

== Cast ==
=== Main cast ===
==== Starring ====
- Peter Dinklage as Tyrion Lannister
- Lena Headey as Cersei Lannister
- Nikolaj Coster-Waldau as Jaime Lannister
- Michelle Fairley as Catelyn Stark
- Emilia Clarke as Daenerys Targaryen
- Aidan Gillen as Petyr "Littlefinger" Baelish
- Iain Glen as Jorah Mormont
- Kit Harington as Jon Snow
- Liam Cunningham as Davos Seaworth
- Isaac Hempstead Wright as Bran Stark
- Richard Madden as Robb Stark
- Sophie Turner as Sansa Stark
- Maisie Williams as Arya Stark
- Alfie Allen as Theon Greyjoy
- John Bradley as Samwell Tarly
- Jack Gleeson as Joffrey Baratheon
- Rory McCann as Sandor "The Hound" Clegane
- Stephen Dillane as Stannis Baratheon
- Carice van Houten as Melisandre
- James Cosmo as Jeor Mormont
- Jerome Flynn as Bronn
- Conleth Hill as Varys
- Sibel Kekilli as Shae
- Natalie Dormer as Margaery Tyrell
- Charles Dance as Tywin Lannister

==== Also starring ====
- Jason Momoa as Khal Drogo

=== Guest cast ===
The recurring actors listed here are those who appeared in season 2. They are listed by the region in which they first appear:

==== At and beyond the Wall ====
- Simon Armstrong as Qhorin Halfhand
- Ben Crompton as Eddison Tollett
- Mark Stanley as Grenn
- Edward Dogliani as the Lord of Bones
- Rose Leslie as Ygritte
- Robert Pugh as Craster
- Hannah Murray as Gilly
- Ian Whyte & Ross Mullan as White Walkers

==== In King's Landing ====
- Callum Wharry as Tommen Baratheon
- Aimee Richardson as Myrcella Baratheon
- Julian Glover as Grand Maester Pycelle
- Dominic Carter as Janos Slynt
- Ian Beattie as Meryn Trant
- Eugene Simon as Lancel Lannister
- Wilko Johnson as Ilyn Payne
- Daniel Portman as Podrick Payne
- Tony Way as Dontos Hollard
- Roy Dotrice as Wisdom Hallyne
- Andrew Wilde as Tobho Mott
- Esmé Bianco as Ros
- Antonia Christophers as Mhaegen
- Sahara Knite as Armeca
- Maisie Dee as Daisy
- Josephine Gillan as Marei

==== In the Stormlands ====
- Gethin Anthony as Renly Baratheon
- Gwendoline Christie as Brienne of Tarth
- Finn Jones as Loras Tyrell

==== On Dragonstone ====
- Kerr Logan as Matthos Seaworth
- Lucian Msamati as Salladhor Saan
- Oliver Ford Davies as Maester Cressen

==== On the Iron Islands ====
- Patrick Malahide as Balon Greyjoy
- Gemma Whelan as Yara Greyjoy
- Ralph Ineson as Dagmer Cleftjaw
- Forbes KB as Black Lorren
- David Coakley as Drennan

==== In the North ====
- Art Parkinson as Rickon Stark
- Donald Sumpter as Maester Luwin
- Ron Donachie as Rodrik Cassel
- Peter Ballance as Farlen
- Kristian Nairn as Hodor
- Natalia Tena as Osha

==== In the Riverlands ====
- Oona Chaplin as Talisa Maegyr
- Michael McElhatton as Roose Bolton
- John Stahl as Rickard Karstark
- Paul Caddell as Jacks
- Aidan Crowe as Quent
- Tyrone McElhennon as Torrhen Karstark
- Fintan McKeown as Amory Lorch
- Ian Gelder as Kevan Lannister
- Ian Whyte as Gregor "The Mountain" Clegane
- Karl Davies as Alton Lannister
- Anthony Morris as the Tickler
- Andy Kellegher as Polliver
- David Fynn as Rennick
- Francis Magee as Yoren
- Joe Dempsie as Gendry
- Ben Hawkey as Hot Pie
- Eros Vlahos as Lommy Greenhands
- Tom Wlaschiha as Jaqen H'ghar
- Andy Beckwith as Rorge
- Gerard Jordan as Biter

==== In Essos ====
- Nonso Anozie as Xaro Xhoan Daxos
- Ian Hanmore as Pyat Pree
- Nicholas Blane as the Spice King
- Slavko Juraga as the Silk King
- Laura Pradelska as Quaithe
- Steven Cole as Kovarro
- Elyes Gabel as Rakharo
- Roxanne McKee as Doreah
- Amrita Acharia as Irri

== Production ==
HBO ordered a second season of Game of Thrones on April 19, 2011, two days after the series premiere. The second season obtained a 15% increase in budget in order to be able to stage the war's most important battle, the Battle of the Blackwater, in episode nine.

Filming took place during 106 shooting days. During three-quarters of those, two crews ("Dragon" and "Wolf") were working simultaneously in different locations.

=== Crew ===
David Benioff and D. B. Weiss serve as main writers and showrunners for the second season. They co-wrote six out of ten episodes. The remaining four episodes were written by story editor Bryan Cogman, A Song of Ice and Fire author George R. R. Martin, and new series writer and co-executive producer Vanessa Taylor, who wrote two episodes.

Alan Taylor was promoted to co-executive producer and directed four episodes, including the season premiere and finale. David Petrarca and David Nutter each directed two episodes, while series cinematographer Alik Sakharov and filmmaker Neil Marshall directed the remaining two.

=== Casting ===
The casting for the second season began in May 2011. Although a large portion of the first-season cast were returning, the producers were still faced with a huge number of new characters to be cast. The producers decided that several characters from A Clash of Kings, including the Freys and Crannogmen Reeds at Winterfell, Frey bannermen of the Starks, the Tullys, Stannis' wife and daughter, Theon's uncle Aeron Greyjoy and the bastard Ramsay Snow would not be cast despite appearing in the novel. Showrunners David Benioff and D. B. Weiss commented on this saying that certain character introductions taking place in A Clash of Kings would be delayed until the third season. This was done due to the large number of characters already introduced in season two, and because they couldn't afford to have people "waiting around" for their characters to become central to the plot. Having to fill so many speaking roles, the showrunners not only "postponed" the introduction of several key characters, but they also merged some into one, or certain plot-functions were given to different characters. Many physical traits were also altered, such as the ethnicity or age of characters. The cast was estimated to be the largest on television. Scattered around two fictional continents characters include:

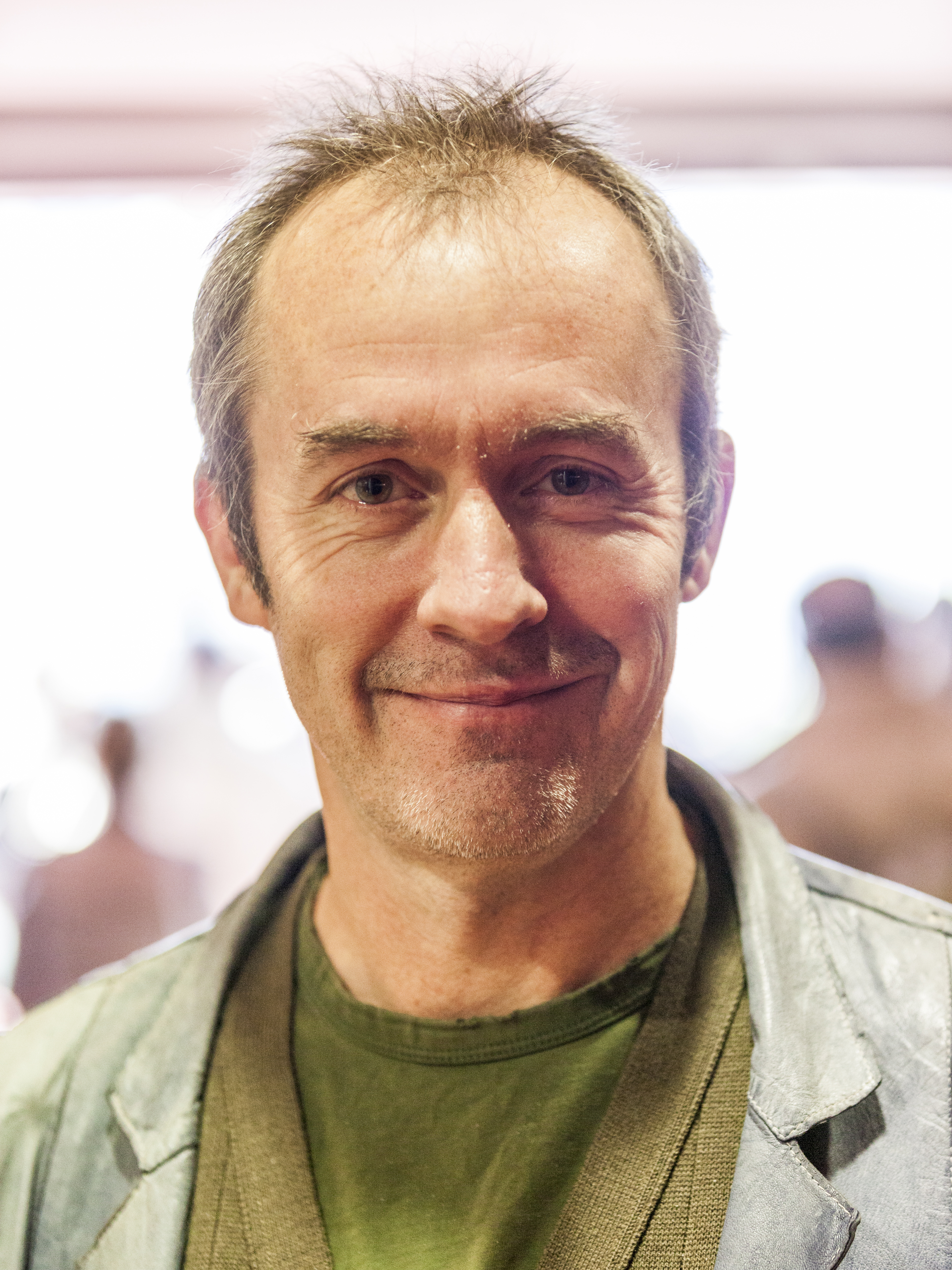
Stephen Dillane (Stannis Baratheon)

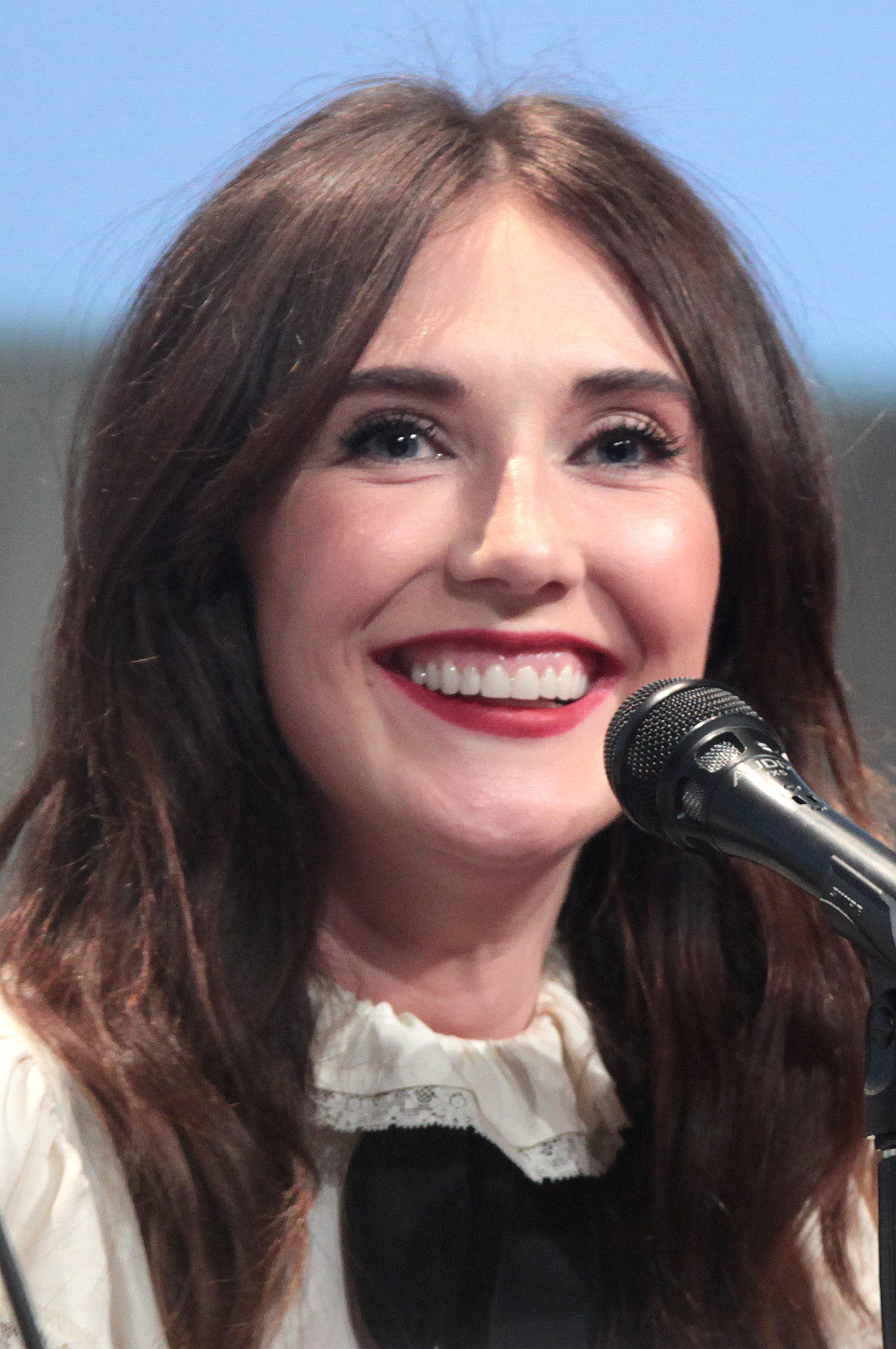
Carice van Houten (Melisandre)

Emerging as the fourth claimant to the throne is the estranged brother of the late king Robert, Stannis Baratheon (Stephen Dillane). The foreign priestess Melisandre, portrayed by Carice van Houten poses as an influential, yet manipulative advisor to Stannis. Van Houten was previously asked (but unable) to audition for the role of Cersei in season one. While her character retains her signature red robes and hair, unlike in the novels Melisandre is not portrayed as having red eyes, making her appear somewhat more human. Liam Cunningham stars as Ser Davos Seaworth, the "Onion Knight", a bannerman of Stannis and a former smuggler. Cunningham had already been in talks for a role in the first season. As he is left-handed, his Davos has the fingers of the right hand shortened, unlike in the novels where his left hand is crippled. In an interview, Cunningham said that a lot of new dialogue had to be written for his character, because in the novels Davos, a point-of-view character, is portrayed more through his thoughts than through his actions. These three characters headed a new storyline set on a different location, that by the end of the season merged with the main plot.

Theon Greyjoy (Alfie Allen), a main cast member from the first season, but with lesser importance than the others, came to prominence during the second season, as his story unfolded and his character became more central. Gemma Whelan appeared as his sister, Yara Greyjoy. Named "Asha" in the novels, the character's name was changed to avoid confusion with the Wildling Osha, Bran Stark's companion. "Asha" is portrayed as a fairly provocative and independent woman, a captain of thirty ships, as opposed to her television counterpart Yara, who did not retain "Asha's" traits, although her rivalry with Theon remained intact. Their father Balon Greyjoy was played by Patrick Malahide. Many of the characters involved in the Greyjoys' storyline weren't introduced, most notably Balon's brother Aeron Greyjoy. Nonetheless, the storyline received enormous praise, with the alteration of Yara's name and persona being the only criticism.

Tom Wlaschiha is cast as Jaqen H'ghar, a mysterious prisoner who develops a murderous relationship with young Arya Stark (Maisie Williams). Wlaschiha's pronunciation of his character's name, Jack-in, was adopted for use in the show. Natalie Dormer, best known for her portrayal as seductive Anne Boleyn in Showtime's The Tudors, was cast in a similar role as Margaery Tyrell, a noblewoman and the wife of the third claimant to the throne, Renly Baratheon. Gwendoline Christie played, to much praise, Brienne of Tarth, a female warrior who joins Renly Baratheon's guard, but later becomes a follower of Catelyn Stark. To prepare for the role, Christie took up an intense training regimen, adding over a stone (6.4 kg) of muscle mass. So that she could be mistaken for a man, her armor was decorated with lines that slant away from her hips. On the other side of the fictional world, two female roles with rising prominence were added to the cast: Skins star Hannah Murray filled the role of Craster's daughter Gilly, a love interest to Samwell Tarly; while the second role, the one of Ygritte, Jon Snow's love interest among the Wildlings, was played by Rose Leslie.

Daenerys Targaryen's (Emilia Clarke) stay at Qarth, opened the way for several recurring characters. Nonso Anozie played Daenerys's host at Qarth, Xaro Xhoan Daxos. The character differed a lot from his novel counterpart. Xaro's homosexuality, femininity and caucasian origin were overshadowed by dark skinned Anozie's masculinity and heterosexuality. Acting as one of her suitors is the treacherous warlock Pyat Pree portrayed by Ian Hanmore. Her third and final suitor was the masked priestess Quaithe (Laura Pradelska). Specially created for the television series was the so-called "Spice King", a rich merchant from Qarth, played by Nicholas Blane. Also an original creation of the show is the character of Talisa (Oona Chaplin), a healer from Volantis and a romantic interest for Robb. She fills the role of another female interest of Robb's, called Jeyne Westerling, who has no similarities with Talisa whatsoever. In addition to Talisa, Michael McElhatton joins the cast in the role of Roose Bolton, an important character in Robb Stark's storyline. Lastly, Simon Armstrong plays the legendary Night's Watch ranger Qhorin Halfhand.

Others were also added to the cast, either in a small recurring role or with reduced prominence. The most notable example is Tony Way's Ser Dontos Hollard, a drunkard knight, who had a pivotal role in Sansa Stark's storyline that ran in the course of two novels, while in the series the role was reduced to a small scene in the opening episode. Others include: Ben Crompton as "Dolorous Edd" Tollet, a man of the Night's Watch. Robert Pugh as the Wildling Craster, father and husband to Gilly. Kerr Logan as Davos Seaworth's pious son Matthos. Karl Davies as Ser Alton Lannister, a character created for the series who replaces Cleos Frey as envoy from the Starks to the Lannisters. Daniel Portman took the role of Podrick Payne, the squire to Tyrion Lannister. The 19-year-old Portman plays Podrick as about 16 years old, instead of about 12 as in the novels. To be able to portray Podrick as awkward, shy and weak, Portman, previously a sportsman, stopped his fitness regimen and gained some weight to appear more endearing. Lucian Msamati played Salladhor Saan, a Lysene pirate and friend of Davos Seaworth. Finally, Edward Dogliani appeared briefly as the "Lord of Bones" (or "Rattleshirt" in the novels), a Wildling leader and Oliver Ford Davies as Stannis's maester Cressen.

All of the recurring characters from the first season returned, with one notable exception: Conan Stevens, whose role of Gregor Clegane was recast with Ian Whyte, did not return. Roy Dotrice, a friend of George R. R. Martin, known for reading the audio versions of the novels and having previously rejected a role for health reasons, appears this season as Pyromancer Hallyne, an elderly alchemist at King's Landing.

=== Locations ===
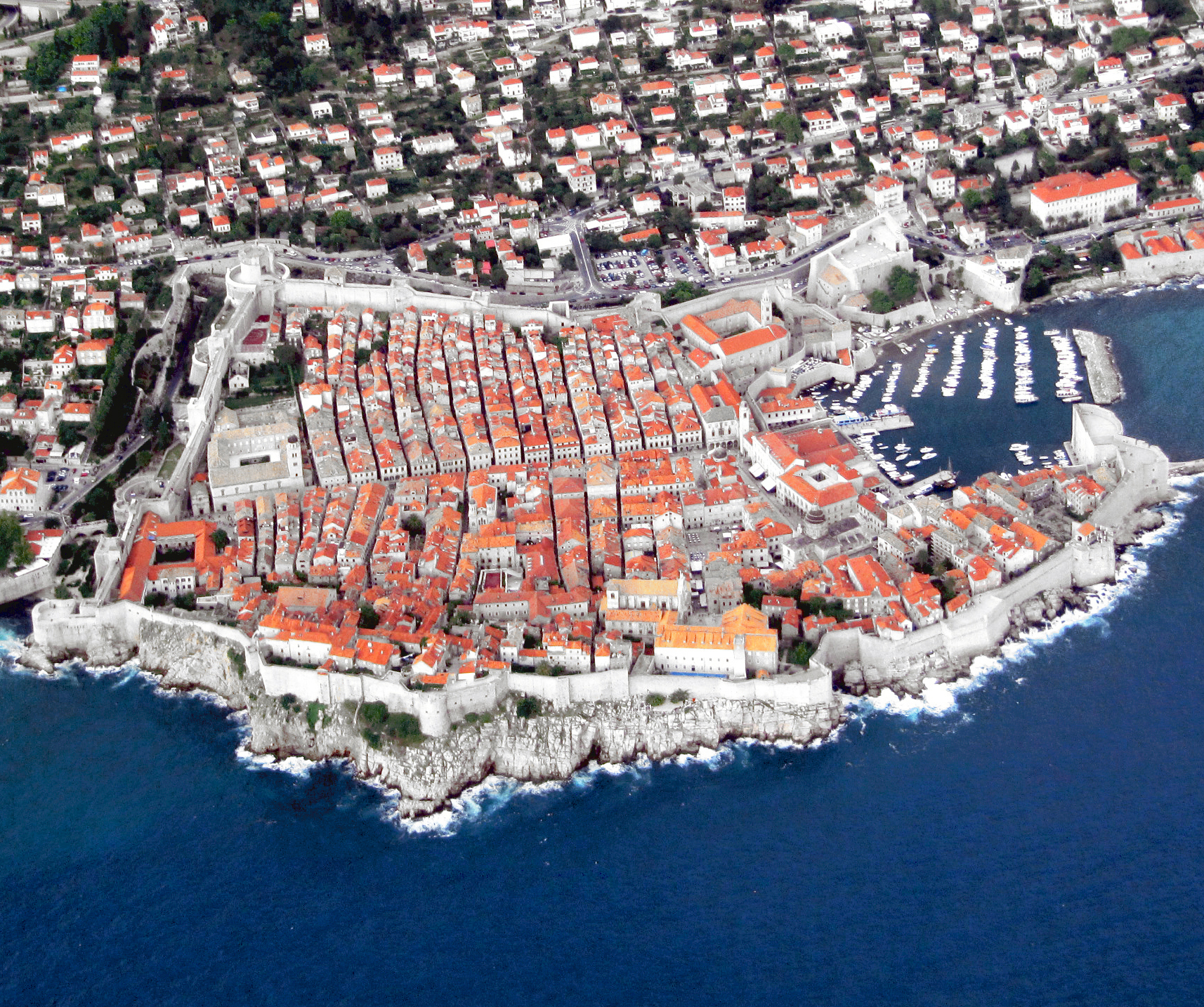
The walled city of Dubrovnik stands in for King's Landing in season 2

For the second season, the city of Dubrovnik, Croatia, was used instead of Malta for scenes in King's Landing and Daenerys' scenes in Qarth. For example, the Minčeta Tower in Dubrovnik was used as the House of the Undying. Scenes set north of the Wall were filmed in Iceland in November 2011. The main locations are the Vatnajökull glacier, the Svínafellsjökull glacier near Skaftafell, and the Mýrdalsjökull glacier near Vik used as the location for the Fist of the First Men with Höfðabrekka as the Frostfang Mountains. New shooting locations in Northern Ireland include The Linen Mill Film & Television Studios in Banbridge, Ballintoy Harbour and Downhill Strand. As the story in the second season required that the Winterfell set be expanded, a new set for Winterfell was built at the Moneyglass Estate near Toome village.

=== Music ===
The music for the second season was again composed by Ramin Djawadi. It contains a rendition of a song often mentioned or sung in the novels, The Rains of Castamere, by the indie rock band The National.

The soundtrack for the season was released on June 19, 2012.

=== Promotion ===
HBO released numerous teaser trailers for the second season, beginning on December 11, 2011. The second trailer, published on January 29, 2012, was viewed 3.5 million times in the first three days after publication, a record for HBO promotional content. Other trailers were released on February 24, March 3 (set to Florence and the Machine's Seven Devils) as well as subsequently.

HBO also published other promotional material, such as cast photographs and teaser posters, prior to the airing of the first episode. The second issue of Entertainment Weekly in March 2012 had four alternative covers dedicated to in-costume photographs of Peter Dinklage (Tyrion), Emilia Clarke (Daenerys), Kit Harington (Jon Snow) or Nikolaj Coster-Waldau and Lena Headey (Jaime and Cersei Lannister).

== Reception ==
=== Pre-release ===
Thanks to the critical and commercial success of the first season, as well as HBO's marketing efforts, the second season received intensive media coverage well before it started airing. Sunday is Coming, a two-minute short film for Funny or Die, satirized viewers' excitement about the return of Game of Thrones. Several media outlets reviewed the season's first four episodes before they were broadcast, and rendered almost uniformly positive verdicts.

=== Critical response ===
Game of Thrones season 2: Critical reception by episode
Season 2 (2012): Percentage of positive critics' reviews tracked by the website Rotten Tomatoes

Several media outlets reviewed the season's first four episodes before they were broadcast, and rendered almost uniformly positive verdicts. The season holds a Metacritic score of 90 out of 100 based on 26 critics, indicating "universal acclaim". On Rotten Tomatoes, the second season has a 96% approval rating from 304 critics with an average rating of 8.9 out of 10. The site's critical consensus reads, "Game of Thrones follows up a strong debut with an even better second season, combining elegant storytelling and vivid characters to create a rich fantasy world."

Brian Lowry of Variety gave the season a positive review and stated, "Thrones creates such a rich visual feast - replete with plenty of gratuitous nudity and blood-letting - as to almost obscure its fundamental storytelling pleasures, which are as much a mob drama as anything else, having traded bullets for broadswords." Nancy deWolf Smith of The Wall Street Journal said that "each week the story unfolds like a tapestry, its intricate stitches slowly creating not just a scene but a whole world." Slant Magazine gave the season 3 out of 4 and stated, "[Game Of Thrones] Season Two must be admired for its gripping presentation of splintered families and unwavering ruthlessness." Emily Nussbaum of The New Yorker gave the season a positive review and stated, "Game of Thrones is the latest entry in television's most esteemed category: the sophisticated cable drama about a patriarchal subculture." Matt Zoller Seitz of Vulture positively spoke about the season that "what's onscreen is so consistently remarkable, and so much smarter than it needed to be in order to satisfy viewers who are mainly looking for sex, violence, and intrigue, that the show's presence feels like a kind of miracle."

David Wiegand of the San Francisco Chronicle its "compelling, murderous and sexy characters". The New York Post stated, "Even though I get so confused my head feels like it's going to explode, Game of Thrones is brainy, good fun." Newsday gave it a score of 'A+' and said that it was "TV's best (but do your homework before diving in)." Ken Tucker of Entertainment Weekly gave it a score of 'A−', who praised its storytelling to be "so vivid, so vital, and just plain fun." Maureen Ryan of HuffPost gave the season a positive review and stated, "It's gratifying to be able to say that the first four hours of Season 2 of Game of Thrones are far more elegant and engaging." Andy Greenwald of Grantland praised its ambition and scope, while James Poniewozik of Time found the premiere episode to be "hustling off steadily and confidently." Peter Dinklage's portrayal of Tyrion Lannister was acclaimed by William Thomas of Empire, who gave it a score of 5 out of 5.

The only major publication to give the season a negative review was Neil Genzlinger of The New York Times, who stated, "You have to have a fair amount of free time on your hands to stick with Game of Thrones, and a fairly low reward threshold."

=== Accolades ===
The second season was nominated for 12 Primetime Emmy Awards, which included Outstanding Drama Series and Outstanding Supporting Actor in a Drama Series for Peter Dinklage. It won six awards, for, Outstanding Costumes for a Series, Outstanding Art Direction for a Single-Camera Series, Outstanding Makeup for a Single-Camera Series (Non-Prosthetic), Outstanding Sound Editing for a Series, Outstanding Sound Mixing for a Comedy or Drama Series (One-Hour), and Outstanding Special Visual Effects.

| Year | Award | Category | Nominee(s) | Result | Ref. |
|---|---|---|---|---|---|
| 2012 | AFI Awards | AFI TV Award | Game of Thrones | Won | |
| 2012 | Artios Awards | Outstanding Achievement in Casting – Television Series Drama | Nina Gold | Nominated | |
| 2012 | ASCAP Awards | Top Television Series | Ramin Djawadi | Won | |
| 2012 | Portal Award | Best Actor | Peter Dinklage | Nominated | |
| 2012 | Portal Award | Best Actress | Lena Headey | Won | |
| 2012 | Portal Award | Best Supporting Actor | Aidan Gillen | Nominated | |
| 2012 | Portal Award | Best Supporting Actress | Michelle Fairley | Nominated | |
| 2012 | Portal Award | Best Supporting Actress | Maisie Williams | Won | |
| 2012 | Portal Award | Best Episode | Ghost of Harrenhal | Nominated | |
| 2012 | Portal Award | Best Series | Game of Thrones | Won | |
| 2012 | Portal Award | Best Young Actor | Jack Gleeson | Nominated | |
| 2012 | Portal Award | Best Young Actor | Maisie Williams | Won | |
| 2012 | EWwy Award | Best Supporting Actress, Drama | Lena Headey | Won | |
| 2012 | 64th Primetime Emmy Awards | Outstanding Drama Series | David Benioff, D. B. Weiss, Frank Doelger, Carolyn Strauss, George R. R. Martin, Vanessa Taylor, Alan Taylor, Guymon Casady, Vince Gerardis and Bernadette Caulfield | Nominated | |
| 2012 | 64th Primetime Emmy Awards | Outstanding Supporting Actor in a Drama Series | Peter Dinklage | Nominated | |
| 2012 | 64th Primetime Creative Arts Emmy Awards | Outstanding Art Direction for a Single-Camera Series | Gemma Jackson, Frank Walsh, and Tina Jones for "Garden of Bones", "The Ghost of Harrenhal" and "A Man Without Honor"^{[Nb 1]} | Won | |
| 2012 | 64th Primetime Creative Arts Emmy Awards | Outstanding Casting for a Drama Series | Nina Gold and Robert Sterne | Nominated | |
| 2012 | 64th Primetime Creative Arts Emmy Awards | Outstanding Costumes for a Series | Michele Clapton, Alexander Fordham, and Chloe Aubry for "The Prince of Winterfell" | Won | |
| 2012 | 64th Primetime Creative Arts Emmy Awards | Outstanding Creative Achievement in Interactive Media | HBO | Nominated | |
| 2012 | 64th Primetime Creative Arts Emmy Awards | Outstanding Hairstyling for a Single-Camera Series | Kevin Alexander, Candice Banks, Rosalia Culora, and Gary Machin for "The Old Gods and the New" | Nominated | |
| 2012 | 64th Primetime Creative Arts Emmy Awards | Outstanding Makeup for a Single-Camera Series (Non-Prosthetic) | Paul Engelen and Melissa Lackersteen for "The Old Gods and the New" | Won | |
| 2012 | 64th Primetime Creative Arts Emmy Awards | Outstanding Prosthetic Makeup for a Series, Miniseries, Movie or a Special | Paul Engelen, Conor O'Sullivan, and Rob Trenton for "Valar Morghulis" | Nominated | |
| 2012 | 64th Primetime Creative Arts Emmy Awards | Outstanding Sound Editing for a Series | Peter Brown, Kira Roessler, Tim Hands, Paul Aulicino, Stephen P. Robinson, Vanessa Lapato, Brett Voss, James Moriana, Jeffrey Wilhoit, and David Klotz for "Blackwater" | Won | |
| 2012 | 64th Primetime Creative Arts Emmy Awards | Outstanding Sound Mixing for a Drama Series (1 hour) | Matthew Waters, Onnalee Blank, Ronan Hill, and Mervyn Moore for "Blackwater" | Won | |
| 2012 | 64th Primetime Creative Arts Emmy Awards | Outstanding Special Visual Effects | Rainer Gombos, Juri Stanossek, Sven Martin, Steve Kullback, Jan Fiedler, Chris Stenner, Tobias Mannewitz, Thilo Ewers, and Adam Chazen for "Valar Morghulis" | Won | |
| 2012 | 2nd Critics' Choice Television Awards | Best Drama Series | Game of Thrones | Nominated | |
| 2012 | 2nd Critics' Choice Television Awards | Best Supporting Actor in a Drama Series | Peter Dinklage | Nominated | |
| 2012 | Hollywood Post Alliance Awards | Outstanding Visual Effects – Television | "The Prince of Winterfell" | Won | |
| 2012 | Golden Nymph awards | Outstanding International Producer | David Benioff, Frank Doelger, Carolyn Strauss and D. B. Weiss | Won | |
| 2012 | Golden Nymph awards | Outstanding Actress in a Drama Series | Emilia Clarke | Nominated | |
| 2012 | Golden Nymph awards | Outstanding Actress in a Drama Series | Lena Headey | Nominated | |
| 2012 | Golden Nymph awards | Outstanding Actor in a Drama Series | Peter Dinklage | Nominated | |
| 2012 | Golden Nymph awards | Outstanding Actor in a Drama Series | Kit Harington | Nominated | |
| 2012 | British Society of Cinematographers | Best Cinematography in a Television Drama | Sam McCurdy for "Blackwater" | Nominated | |
| 2012 | 17th Satellite Awards | Best Supporting Actor – Series, Miniseries or Television Film | Peter Dinklage | Nominated | |
| 2012 | 17th Satellite Awards | Best Television Series – Drama | Game of Thrones | Nominated | |
| 2012 | IGN Awards | Best TV Episode | Blackwater | Won | |
| 2012 | IGN Awards | Best TV DVD or Blu-ray | For the complete first season on Blu-ray | Won | |
| 2012 | IGN Awards | Best TV Series | Game of Thrones | Nominated | |
| 2012 | IGN Awards | Best TV Drama Series | Game of Thrones | Nominated | |
| 2012 | IGN Awards | Best TV Villain | Jack Gleeson as Joffrey Baratheon | Nominated | |
| 2012 | IGN People's Choice Award | Best TV Episode | Blackwater | Won | |
| 2012 | IGN People's Choice Award | Best TV Drama Series | Game of Thrones | Won | |
| 2012 | IGN People's Choice Award | Best TV Villain | Jack Gleeson as Joffrey Baratheon | Won | |
| 2012 | IGN People's Choice Award | Best TV DVD or Blu-ray | For the complete first season on Blu-ray | Won | |
| 2012 | IGN People's Choice Award | Best TV Series | Game of Thrones | Won | |
| 2012 | 28th TCA Awards | Program of the Year | Game of Thrones | Won | |
| 2012 | 28th TCA Awards | Individual Achievement in Drama | Peter Dinklage | Nominated | |
| 2012 | 28th TCA Awards | Outstanding Achievement in Drama | Game of Thrones | Nominated | |
| 2012 | Gold Derby TV Awards 2012 | Best Drama Series | Game of Thrones | Nominated | |
| 2012 | Gold Derby TV Awards 2012 | Best Drama Supporting Actor | Peter Dinklage | Nominated | |
| 2012 | Gold Derby TV Awards 2012 | Best Drama Supporting Actress | Lena Headey | Nominated | |
| 2012 | Gold Derby TV Awards 2012 | Breakthrough Performer of the Year | Maisie Williams | Nominated | |
| 2012 | Gold Derby TV Awards 2012 | Ensemble of the Year | The cast of Game of Thrones | Nominated | |
| 2013 | People's Choice Awards | Favorite Thriller Show | Game of Thrones | Nominated | |
| 2013 | ADG Excellence in Production Design Award | One-Hour Single Camera Television Series | Gemma Jackson for "The Ghost of Harrenhal" | Won | |
| 2013 | American Society of Cinematographers | Outstanding Achievement in Cinematography in One-Hour Episodic Television Series | Kramer Morgenthau for "The North Remembers" | Won | |
| 2013 | SFX Awards | Best Actress | Emilia Clarke | Won | |
| 2013 | SFX Awards | Best Actress | Lena Headey | Nominated | |
| 2013 | SFX Awards | Best Actor | Peter Dinklage | Nominated | |
| 2013 | NewNowNext Awards | Cause You're Hot | Richard Madden | Nominated | |
| 2013 | British Academy Television Awards | International | Game of Thrones | Nominated | |
| 2013 | British Academy Television Awards | Radio Times Audience Award | Game of Thrones | Won | |
| 2013 | Costume Designers Guild Awards | Outstanding Period/Fantasy Television Series | Game of Thrones | Nominated | |
| 2013 | Cinema Audio Society Awards | Outstanding Achievement in Sound Mixing – Television Series – One Hour | Ronan Hill, Onnalee Blank, Mathew Waters, and Brett Voss for "Blackwater" | Nominated | |
| 2013 | Dorian Awards | TV Drama of the Year | Game of Thrones | Nominated | |
| 2013 | 10th Irish Film & Television Awards | Best Television Drama | Game of Thrones | Nominated | |
| 2013 | 10th Irish Film & Television Awards | Best Director of Photography | P.J. Dillon | Nominated | |
| 2013 | 10th Irish Film & Television Awards | Best Sound | Ronan Hill, Mervyn Moore | Nominated | |
| 2013 | Astra Awards | Favourite Program – International Drama | Game of Thrones | Won | |
| 2013 | Golden Reel Awards | Best Sound Editing – Long Form Dialogue and ADR in Television | Game of Thrones for "Valar Morghulis" | Won | |
| 2013 | Golden Reel Awards | Best Sound Editing – Long Form Sound Effects and Foley in Television | Game of Thrones for "Valar Morghulis" | Won | |
| 2013 | Golden Reel Awards | Best Sound Editing — Short Form Dialogue and ADR in Television | Game of Thrones for "Blackwater" | Nominated | |
| 2013 | Golden Reel Awards | Best Sound Editing – Short Form Music in Television | Game of Thrones for "Blackwater" | Nominated | |
| 2013 | Golden Reel Awards | Best Sound Editing – Short Form Sound Effects and Foley in Television | Game of Thrones for "Blackwater" | Nominated | |
| 2013 | Hugo Awards | Best Dramatic Presentation, Short Form | Neil Marshall (director) and George R. R. Martin (writer) for "Blackwater" | Won | |
| 2013 | Producers Guild Awards | "The Norman Felton Award for Outstanding Producer of Episodic Television, Drama" | David Benioff, Bernadette Caulfield, Frank Doelger, Carolyn Strauss, D. B. Weiss | Nominated | |
| 2013 | Saturn Award | Best Television Presentation | Game of Thrones | Nominated | |
| 2013 | 19th Screen Actors Guild Awards | Outstanding Action Performance by a Stunt Ensemble in a Television Series | Rob Cooper, Jamie Edgell, Dave Fisher, Dave Forman, Paul Herbert, Michelle McKeown, Sian Miline, Jimmy O’Dee, Domonkos Pardanyi, Marcus Shakesheff, CC Smiff, and Mark Southworth | Won | |
| 2013 | Visual Effects Society | Outstanding Animated Character in a Commercial or Broadcast Program | Irfan Celik, Florian Friedmann, Ingo Schachner, Chris Stenner for "Training the Dragons" | Won | |
| 2013 | Visual Effects Society | Outstanding Compositing in a Broadcast Program | Falk Boje, Esther Engel, Alexey Kuchinsky, Klaus Wuchta for "White Walker Army" | Won | |
| 2013 | Visual Effects Society | Outstanding Created Environment in a Commercial or Broadcast Program | Rene Borst, Thilo Ewers, Adam Figielski, Jonas Stuckenbrock for "Pyke" | Won | |
| 2013 | Visual Effects Society | Outstanding Visual Effects in a Broadcast Program | Rainer Gombos, Steve Kullback, Sven Martin, Juri Stanossek for "Valar Morghulis" | Won | |
| 2013 | Writers Guild of America Awards | Television Drama Series | David Benioff, Bryan Cogman, George R. R. Martin, Vanessa Taylor, D. B. Weiss | Nominated | |
| 2013 | Young Artist Award | Best Performance in a TV Series – Supporting Young Actor | Isaac Hempstead-Wright | Nominated | |
| 2013 | Young Artist Award | Best Performance in a TV Series – Supporting Young Actress | Sophie Turner | Nominated | |
| 2013 | Young Artist Award | Best Performance in a TV Series – Supporting Young Actress | Maisie Williams | Nominated | |
| 2013 | IGN Awards | Best TV DVD or Blu-ray | For the complete second season on Blu-ray | Nominated | |

== Release ==
=== Broadcast ===
The second season of Game of Thrones was broadcast on HBO in the United States from April 1, 2012, to June 3, 2012.

=== Home media ===
DVD/Blu-ray box sets and digital downloads of the second season were released in North America on February 19, 2013. The DVD set contains a 30-minute feature covering the production of the episode "Blackwater", actor interviews, character profiles, twelve audio commentaries by cast and crew, and a discussion about Westerosi religions by the showrunners and George R. R. Martin. The Blu-ray set additionally contains a feature about the "War of the Five Kings" that breaks out in season two, as well as 19 animated histories of the mythology of Westeros and Essos.

Game of Thrones: The Complete Second Season
| Set details | Special features | |
| Format: AC-3, Blu-ray, DTS Surround Sound, Dubbed, NTSC, Subtitled, Widescreen; Language: English, French, Castilian, Czech, Hungarian, Polish, Spanish; Subtitles: English, Castilian, Spanish, Czech, Danish, Dutch, Finnish, French, Hebrew, Hungarian, Norwegian, Polish, Portuguese, Romanian, Serbian, Swedish, Turkish; 16:9 aspect ratio; 5-disc set, 10 episodes | "Creating the Battle of Blackwater Bay": A 30-minute feature including new footage from the set and interviews.; "Game of Thrones: Inner Circle": Interviews with several cast member to talk about their experiences shooting season two, moderated by executive producers David Benioff and D. B. Weiss.; "The Religions of Westeros": George R. R. Martin, David Benioff and D. B. Weiss discuss the competing religions in the series and how they influence the various characters in Westeros and beyond.; "Character Profiles": Profiles of seven major characters as described by the actors portraying them including Renly Baratheon, Stannis Baratheon, Robb Stark, Theon Greyjoy and more.; Twelve audio commentaries by, among others, Benioff, Weiss, Martin, Clarke, Dinklage, Harington and more.; Blu-ray exclusive: "War of the Five Kingss": Track the claims, strategies and key players involved in the battle for the Iron Throne with this interactive guide that follows the movements of various armies detailing their victories and defeats.; "Histories & Lore": 19 animated histories detailing the mythology of Westeros and Essos as told from the varying perspectives of the characters themselves and featuring, in-part, illustrations from Game of Thrones storyboard artist Will Simpson.; "In-Episode Guide": In-feature resource that provides background information about on-screen characters, locations and relevant histories.; "Hidden Dragon Eggs", easter eggs. | |
DVD release dates
| Region 1 | Region 2 | Region 4 |
| February 19, 2013 | March 4, 2013 | March 6, 2013 |

=== Copyright infringement ===
The second season of Game of Thrones was the most-pirated TV series in 2012.
