= Vanessa Taylor =

American screenwriter and television producer

- Born: September 24, 1970 (age 56); Boulder, Colorado, U.S.
- Occupations: Screenwriter; producer
- Years active: 1998–present
- Notable work: Hope Springs; Divergent; The Shape of Water

Vanessa Taylor (born September 24, 1970) is an American screenwriter and television producer. She is best known for writing the screenplay for the films Hope Springs, Divergent, and The Shape of Water. For her work on The Shape of Water, Taylor was nominated for the Academy Award for Best Original Screenplay.

== Early life and education ==
As a child, Taylor wrote fairy tales. From age twelve, Taylor pursued acting and singing. She attended the Interlochen Center for the Arts in Michigan, and later joined The Groundlings for two years.

== Career ==
Her television credits include Game of Thrones, Gideon's Crossing, Alias, Everwood, Tell Me You Love Me, and Cupid. She also co-created Jack & Bobby.

Taylor's debut feature film script was Hope Springs (2012), directed by David Frankel, about a marriage therapist who tries to help a couple rekindle their loveless relationship after 31 years of marriage. She then co-wrote the screenplay for the sci-fi action film Divergent (2014).

Taylor co-wrote the screenplay for the fantasy romance film The Shape of Water (2017), along with its director Guillermo del Toro. For her work, she was nominated for the Academy Award for Best Original Screenplay.

In 2019, Taylor performed an uncredited rewrite on Disney's live action remake of Aladdin, directed by Guy Ritchie. The following year, Taylor adapted the screenplay for Netflix's Hillbilly Elegy. She continued her relationship with Netflix over the following years, doing uncredited work on The School for Good and Evil (2022) and writing the screenplay for the young adult dystopian film Uglies (2024).

== Awards and nominations ==
Taylor was nominated for two Primetime Emmy awards for Outstanding Drama Series for Game of Thrones in 2012 and 2013.

She was also nominated for a WGA Award (Drama Series) in 2013 for Game of Thrones.

In 2012, Taylor was nominated for a WIN Outstanding Writer Award (Outstanding Film or Show Written by a Woman) in 2012 for Hope Springs.

Alongside her The Shape of Water co-writer and director Guillermo del Toro, Taylor was honoured with the 2017 PEN Center USA Screenplay Award at the 27th Annual Literary Awards Festival.

She was nominated for the Academy Award for Best Original Screenplay for The Shape of Water. She was also nominated for the Saturn Award for Best Writing.

== Filmography ==
=== Film ===
Writer

Year	Title	Director	Notes
2012	Hope Springs	David Frankel	
2014	Divergent	Neil Burger	
2017	The Shape of Water	Guillermo del Toro	Nominated for the Academy Award for Best Original Screenplay
2020	Hillbilly Elegy	Ron Howard	Nominated for the Golden Raspberry Award for Worst Screenplay
2024	Uglies	McG	

Uncredited writer

- Aladdin (2019)
- The School for Good and Evil (2022)

=== Television ===
Producer

Year	Title	Notes
2012-2013	Game of Thrones	Co-executive producer (Season 3 and Season 2)
2007	Tell Me You Love Me	Consulting producer (Season 1)
2004-2005	Jack & Bobby	Co-creator and co-executive producer (Season 1)
2002-2004	Everwood	Supervising producer (Season 2)
2001-2002	Alias	Co-producer (Season 1)

Writer

Year	Title	Episode	Notes
2013	Game of Thrones	"Dark Wings, Dark Words"	
2012	Game of Thrones	"The Old Gods and the New"	
2012	Game of Thrones	"Garden of Bones"	
2007	Tell Me You Love Me	"Episode #1.9"	
2007	Tell Me You Love Me	"Episode #1.5"	
2005	Jack & Bobby	"Pilot"	Co-creator
2004	Everwood	"Do or Die"	
2003	Everwood	"Burden of Truth"	
2003	Everwood	"My Brother's Keeper"	
2003	Everwood	"Home"	
2003	Everwood	"Episode 20"	
2003	Everwood	"My Funny Valentine"	
2002	Everwood	"A Thanksgiving Tale"	
2002	Everwood	"The Doctor Is In"	
2001	Alias	"Spirit"	
2001	Alias	"A Broken Heart"	
2000	Gideon's Crossing		
1998	Cupid	"Botched Makeover"	
