= Nicholas Blane =

English actor

- Born: Leicester, England
- Occupation: Actor
- Years active: 1987–present

Nicholas Blane is an English actor.

== Career ==
He is best known for his roles in stage productions such as Year of the Rat, See How They Run and Democracy.

He has appeared in numerous British television and film projects, including Coronation Street (1993–2010), Heartbeat (1993–1998), Trial & Retribution (1997–2002), Dalziel and Pascoe (1997), Life Force, Sharpe's Challenge (2006) and The Great Fire (2014). He played the role of Wopsle in the BBC adaptation of Great Expectations (1999) and he appeared in minor roles in The Illusionist (2006) and Harry Potter and the Order of the Phoenix (2007).

In 2012 he starred as the Spice King in the second season of the HBO TV series Game of Thrones.

== Selected filmography ==
=== Film ===
Year	Title	Role	Notes
1995	Some Kind of Life	Mr. Rawlings	TV film
1999	Great Expectations	Wopsle	TV film
2005	Pierrepoint	Governor of Strangeways	
2005	Kinky Boots		
2006	The Illusionist	Herr Doebler	
2006	Sharpe's Challenge	Crosby	TV film
2007	Harry Potter and the Order of the Phoenix	Bob	
2007	The Shadow in the North	Mr. Harkness	TV film
2009	Glorious 39	Vicar	
2012	National Theatre Live: The Magistrate	Mr. Bullamy	
2013	In Secret	Chemist	
2017	Viceroy's House	Olaf Kirkpatrick Caroe	
2019	Hope Gap	Priest	
2020	The Good Traitor	Winston Churchill	
2023	Dungeons & Dragons: Honor Among Thieves	Chancellor Anderton	

=== Television ===
Year	Title	Role	Notes
1987	Agatha Christie's Miss Marple	Paddington Porter	1.09 ("4:50 from Paddington")
1993–1998	Heartbeat	Bank Manager / Mr. Hepplewhite / Mr. Handley	3 episodes
1993–2010	Coronation Street	Mr. Stapleton / Neville Green / Judge	9 episodes
1996	The Bill	Roly	1 episode ("Bounds of Decency")
1997	Dalziel and Pascoe	Sir William Pledger	1 episode ("Exit Lines")
1997–2002	Trial & Retribution	Derek Waugh	6 episodes
2000	Life Force	Scuzz	
2008	Little Dorrit	Lawyer	4 episodes
2009–2014	Law & Order: UK	Coroner Oswald Spear	5 episodes
2010	The Tudors	Sidwell	1 episode ("Natural Ally")
2010	Whitechapel	Lord Hessel	1 episode ("Episode 2.2")
2012	Game of Thrones	The Spice King	3 episodes
2013	Spies of Warsaw	Papa Heiniger	2 episodes
2014	The Great Fire	Mayor Bludworth	2 episodes
2015	The Musketeers	Duc De Barville	1 episode ("A Marriage of Inconvenience")
2021	It's a Sin	Mr. Hart	2 episodes
2021	Doctor Who	Millington	1 episode ("Survivors of the Flux")
2025	Andor	Karloo	1 episode
