= Aimee Richardson =

Northern Irish actress (born 1997)

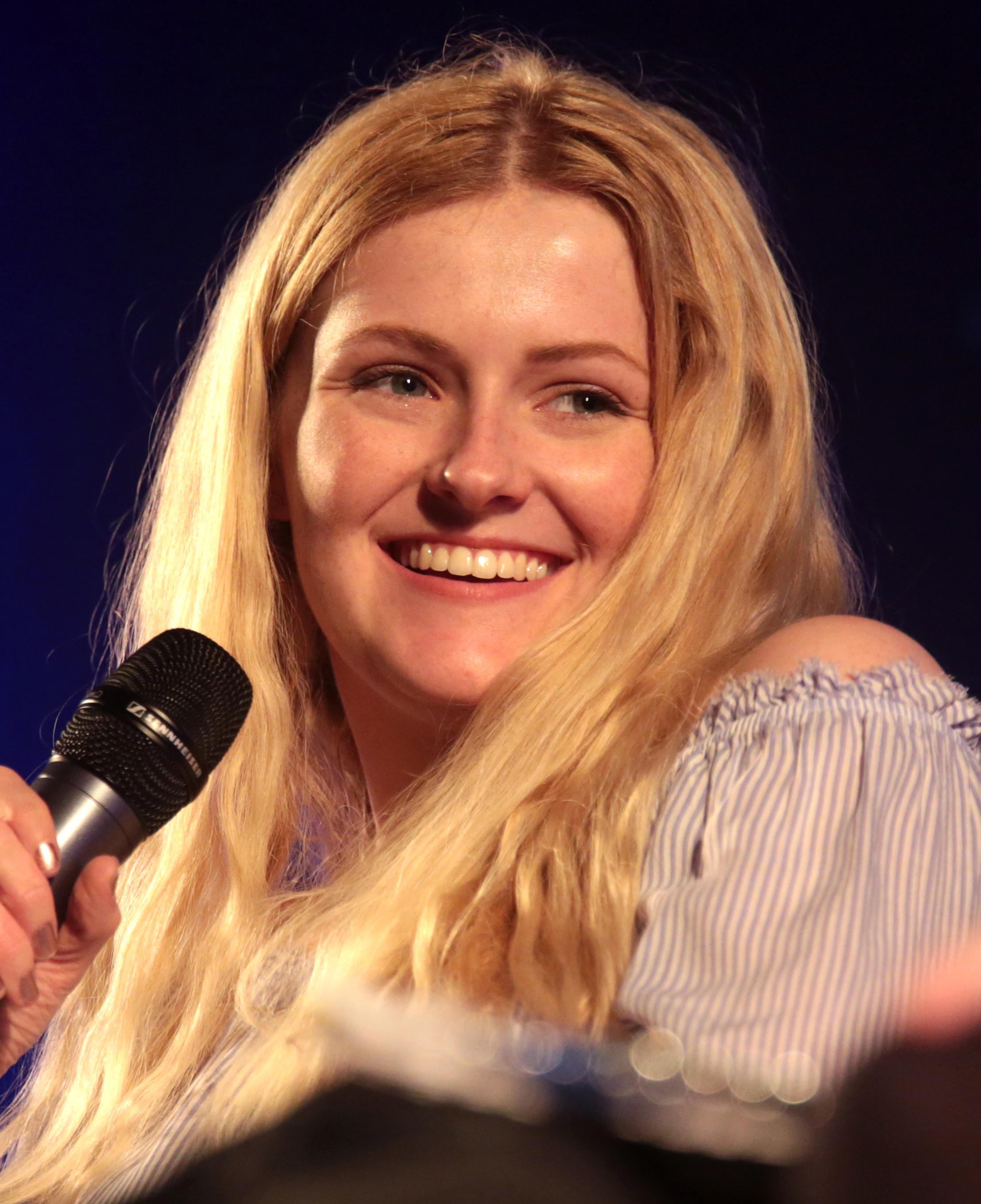
- Richardson in 2017
- Born: 29 December 1997 (age 28); Bangor, County Down, Northern Ireland
- Occupation: Actress
- Years active: 2008–present
- Television: Game of Thrones

Aimee Richardson (born 29 December 1997) is a Northern Irish actress. She is best known for her role as Myrcella Baratheon in the first two seasons of the television series Game of Thrones (2011–2012).

== Life and career ==
Aimee Richardson was born on 29 December 1997 in Bangor, County Down, Northern Ireland. Richardson's first major acting role was her portrayal of Georgina in romantic comedy Miss Conception in 2008.

In 2011, Richardson was cast to play princess Myrcella Baratheon in Game of Thrones. After the first two seasons, her character was exiled in-universe and therefore did not appear in the third or fourth seasons. At the 2014 San Diego Comic-Con, it was announced that the character was returning for the fifth season; however, the official cast list showed that the role had been recast to English actress Nell Tiger Free. HBO, the show's producers, offered no explanation for the decision. Richardson responded by uploading a video to Vine depicting her sitting on a pavement with a princess crown and a sign saying "PRINCESS FOR HIRE". The humorous reaction was received well by media sources, with The Daily Dot and The Radio Times describing it as "hilarious", and similar reactions from others. Business Insider, HuffPost and Insider Culture have noted that it is not uncommon for characters to be recast in Game of Thrones. Free later said Richardson handled it "brilliantly" and in a "humble" manner.

Since appearing on Game of Thrones, Richardson has been cast for roles on several other television shows such as The Sparticle Mystery (2015), Storyland (2016) and My Mother and Other Strangers (2016).

== Filmography ==
Year	Title	Role	Notes	Ref.
2008	Miss Conception	Georgina	Film	
2011–2012	Game of Thrones	Myrcella Baratheon	Television series	
2015	The Sparticle Mystery	Althea	Television series	
2016	Storyland	Gemma	Television series	
2016	My Mother and Other Strangers	Minnie Ryan	Television series	
2017	Fright Shorts	Zombie Girl	Streaming series	
2018	Pills	Andy	Short film	
2019	The Break	Kerry	Streaming series	
2024	Haunted Ulster Live	Michelle	Film	
