= Thronecast =

British television series about Game of Thrones

- Genre: Talk show
- Presented by: Geoff Lloyd; Annabel Port; Grace Dent; Jamie East; Rachel Parris; Sue Perkins
- Country of origin: United Kingdom
- Original language: English
- No. of series: 8
- No. of episodes: 77

Production
- Executive producers: Danny Tipping; Ruby Thomas; Ben Boyer
- Production locations: Sky Studios, London
- Camera setup: Multi-camera
- Running time: 60 minutes
- Production companies: Znak & Co Ltd for Sky Atlantic

Original release
- Network: Sky Atlantic
- Release: 18 April 2011 – 20 May 2019

Related
- Game of Thrones

Thronecast is a British television series which aired on Sky Atlantic between 2011 and 2019. From the fifth series onwards, the show was presented by Sue Perkins and Jamie East. It is an aftershow to Game of Thrones, which also aired on the channel in the United Kingdom. Each episode varied between 10 minutes and 60 minutes in length and featured interviews with cast and crew members, interaction with the audience through social media, and analysis of the episode, along with a preview of the next episode of Game of Thrones. It was the only official aftershow for the series until HBO aired After the Thrones in 2016, providing an aftershow to the show's sixth series until it was cancelled after ten episodes.

Thronecast was originally devised by executive producers Ruby Thomas, Ben Boyer and Koink Productions Ltd for Sky Digital Entertainment. The series began airing online in April 2011 as a series of 10-minute podcasts presented by Geoff Lloyd to correspond with the first series of Game of Thrones. Annabel Port joined Geoff for the second series, which corresponded with the broadcast of the second series of Game of Thrones. For the third series, Thronecast became a 15-minute on-air show that was broadcast on Sky Atlantic following each episode of the third series of Game of Thrones and featured new guest presenter Grace Dent. The fourth series was presented by Jamie East and Rachel Parris and was 30 minutes long. The fifth series was presented by Sue Perkins and Jamie East and was 30 minutes long, except for the series finale which was an extended hour long special. Perkins and East continued to present the seventh and eighth series of the show which were all 60 minutes long with the exception of the final episode of the show, which was 70 minutes. Series 7 and 8 included pre-series episodes titled War Room, and the eighth series also included a 90-minute-long gameshow titled Gameshow of Thrones and a 30-minute pre-finale episode titled Thronecast: The End Is Coming.

Each series was also made available on Sky Go, On Demand (previously Sky Anytime and Sky Anytime+) and NOW TV. Series 1 to 4 of Thronecast were produced by Koink Productions Ltd for Sky Atlantic. Series 5 of Thronecast was produced by CPL Productions for Sky Atlantic. Series 6 and 7 of the show were produced by Sky's in-house production company, Sky Vision Productions. Series 8 of the show was produced by independent production company Znak & Co Ltd.

== Cast ==
- Geoff Lloyd (seasons 1–3)
- Annabel Port (seasons 2–3)
- Grace Dent (season 3)
- Jamie East (seasons 4–8)
- Rachel Parris (season 4)
- Sue Perkins (seasons 5–8)

== Episodes ==
=== Series overview ===
Series	Episodes	Originally released	
Series	Episodes	First released	Last released
1	10	18 April 2011	20 June 2011
2	10	2 April 2012	4 June 2012
3	10	1 April 2013	10 June 2013
4	10	7 April 2014	16 June 2014
5	10	13 April 2015	15 June 2015
6	10	25 April 2016	27 June 2016
7	Special	12 July 2017	
7	7	17 July 2017	28 August 2017
8	Specials	30 March 2019	8 April 2019
8	7	15 April 2019	20 May 2019

=== Series 1 (2011) ===
No. overall	No. in series	Episode	Guest(s)	Role(s)	Original release date	Viewers (millions)
1	1	"Winter Is Coming"	Mark Addy	Robert Baratheon	18 April 2011	N/A
2	2	"The Kingsroad"	Nikolaj Coster-Waldau	Jaime Lannister	25 April 2011	N/A
3	3	"Lord Snow"	Harry Lloyd	Viserys Targaryen	2 May 2011	N/A
4	4	"Cripples, Bastards, and Broken Things"	Jason Momoa	Khal Drogo	9 May 2011	N/A
5	5	"The Wolf and the Lion"	N/A	N/A	16 May 2011	N/A
6	6	"A Golden Crown"	Harry Lloyd/Jason Momoa	Viserys Targaryen/Khal Drogo	23 May 2011	N/A
7	7	"You Win or You Die"	Gethin Anthony	Renly Baratheon	30 May 2011	N/A
8	8	"The Pointy End"	Michelle Fairley	Catelyn Stark	6 June 2011	N/A
9	9	"Baelor"	N/A	N/A	13 June 2011	N/A
10	10	"Fire and Blood"	Natalia Tena/Jason Momoa	Osha/Khal Drogo	20 June 2011	N/A

=== Series 2 (2012) ===
An extended special episode of Thronecast was filmed before the start of the second series, which featured interviews with Emilia Clarke (Daenerys Targaryen), Alfie Allen (Theon Greyjoy), Michelle Fairley (Catelyn Stark), Kit Harington (Jon Snow), Charles Dance (Tywin Lannister), Liam Cunningham (Davos Seaworth), and Nikolaj Coster-Waldau (Jaime Lannister).

No. overall	No. in series	Episode	Guest(s)	Role(s)	Original release date	Viewers (millions)
11	1	"The North Remembers"	N/A	N/A	2 April 2012	
12	2	"The Night Lands"	Maisie Williams	Arya Stark	9 April 2012	N/A
13	3	"What Is Dead May Never Die"	George R.R. Martin	Author	16 April 2012	N/A
14	4	"Garden of Bones"	Sophie Turner	Sansa Stark	23 April 2012	N/A
15	5	"The Ghost of Harrenhal"	Gemma Whelan	Yara Greyjoy	30 April 2012	N/A
16	6	"The Old Gods and the New"	Isaac Hempstead-Wright	Bran Stark	7 May 2012	N/A
17	7	"A Man Without Honor"	N/A	N/A	14 May 2012	N/A
18	8	"The Prince of Winterfell"	John Bradley-West	Samwell Tarly	21 May 2012	N/A
19	9	"Blackwater"	Kristian Nairn	Hodor	28 May 2012	N/A
20	10	"Valar Morghulis"	Natalia Tena	Osha	4 June 2012	N/A

=== Series 3 (2013) ===
No. overall	No. in series	Episode	Guest(s)	Role(s)	Original release date	Viewers (millions)
21	1	"Valar Dohaeris"	Rose Leslie	Ygritte	1 April 2013	0.441
22	2	"Dark Wings, Dark Words"	Isaac Hempstead-Wright	Bran Stark	8 April 2013	0.320
23	3	"Walk of Punishment"	Joe Dempsie	Gendry	15 April 2013	0.268
24	4	"And Now His Watch Is Ended"	Nikolaj Coster-Waldau	Jaime Lannister	22 April 2013	0.228
25	5	"Kissed by Fire"	Finn Jones	Loras Tyrell	29 April 2013	0.139
26	6	"The Climb"	John Bradley	Samwell Tarly	6 May 2013	0.193
27	7	"The Bear and the Maiden Fair"	Ellie Kendrick	Meera Reed	13 May 2013	0.150
28	8	"Second Sons"	N/A	N/A	27 May 2013	0.152
29	9	"The Rains of Castamere"	Maisie Williams	Arya Stark	3 June 2013	0.167
30	10	"Mhysa"	Carice van Houten	Melisandre	10 June 2013	0.179

=== Series 4 (2014) ===
No. overall	No. in series	Episode	Guest(s)	Role(s)	Original release date	Viewers (millions)
31	1	"Two Swords"	Maisie Williams/John Bradley	Arya Stark/Samwell Tarly	7 April 2014	0.403
32	2	"The Lion and the Rose"	Isaac Hempstead-Wright/Tony Way	Bran Stark/Dontos Hollard	14 April 2014	0.242
33	3	"Breaker of Chains"	Rory McCann/Daniel Portman	Sandor "The Hound" Clegane/Podrick Payne	21 April 2014	0.253
34	4	"Oathkeeper"	Thomas Sangster/Chris Newman	Jojen Reed/Producer	28 April 2014	0.257
35	5	"First of His Name"	Aidan Gillen/Jonathan Ross	Petyr Baelish/Superfan	5 May 2014	0.220
36	6	"The Laws of Gods and Men"	Liam Cunningham/Ross Mullan	Davos Seaworth/White Walker	12 May 2014	0.335
37	7	"Mockingbird"	Carice van Houten/Gemma Whelan	Melisandre/Yara Greyjoy	19 May 2014	0.280
38	8	"The Mountain and the Viper"	Ian McElhinney/David J. Peterson	Barristan Selmy/Language creator	2 June 2014	0.271
39	9	"The Watchers on the Wall"	Paul Herbert	Stunt Coordinator	9 June 2014	0.246
40	10	"The Children"	Iwan Rheon/Natalia Tena	Ramsay Bolton/Osha	16 June 2014	0.302

=== Series 5 (2015) ===
The series finale was an extended one-hour episode and was viewed by 560,000 viewers, making it the second highest-rated broadcast that week, behind the actual episode. It also received 29,000 timeshifted viewers.

No. overall	No. in series	Episode	Guest(s)	Role(s)	Original release date	Viewers (millions)
41	1	"The Wars to Come"	Liam Cunningham/Dermot O'Leary	Davos Seaworth/Superfan	13 April 2015	0.419
42	2	"The House of Black and White"	Jacob Anderson/Jimmy Carr	Grey Worm/Superfan	20 April 2015	0.222
43	3	"High Sparrow"	Iwan Rheon	Ramsay Bolton	27 April 2015	0.246
44	4	"The Sons of the Harpy"	Ian McElhinney	Barristan Selmy	4 May 2015	0.206
45	5	"Kill the Boy"	Daniel Portman	Podrick Payne	11 May 2015	0.238
46	6	"Unbowed, Unbent, Unbroken"	Jessica Henwick/Michael Ball	Nymeria Sand/Superfan	18 May 2015	0.371
47	7	"The Gift"	Dean-Charles Chapman	Tommen Baratheon	25 May 2015	0.347
48	8	"Hardhome"	Carice Van Houten/Emma Willis/Al Murray	Melisandre/Superfan	1 June 2015	0.482
49	9	"The Dance of Dragons"	Michael McElhatton/Ricky Wilson	Roose Bolton/Superfan	8 June 2015	0.516
50	10	"Mother's Mercy"	Gwendoline Christie/Jonathan Ross	Brienne of Tarth/Superfan	15 June 2015	0.560

=== Series 6 (2016) ===
The series finale was an extended one-hour episode and was viewed by 587,000 viewers, making it the second highest-rated broadcast that week, behind the actual episode. It also received 45,000 timeshifted viewers.

No. overall	No. in series	Episode	Guest(s)	Role(s)	Original release date	Viewers (millions)
51	1	"The Red Woman"	Mark Addy/Jonathan Ross	Robert Baratheon/Superfan	27 April 2016	0.446
52	2	"Home"	Charlotte Hope/Russell Tovey/Edith Bowman	Myranda/Superfan/Superfan	2 May 2016	0.466
53	3	"Oathbreaker"	Tommy Dunne/Robert Webb	Weapons Master/Superfan	9 May 2016	0.452
54	4	"Book of the Stranger"	Kate Dickie/Rachel Riley	Lysa Arryn/Superfan	16 May 2016	0.432
55	5	"The Door"	Donald Sumpter/Lauren Laverne	Maester Luwin/Superfan	23 May 2016	0.483
56	6	"Blood of My Blood"	Ian Beattie/Paul Hollywood	Meryn Trant/Superfan	30 May 2016	0.414
57	7	"The Broken Man"	Miltos Yerolemou/Rob Beckett/Melvin Odoom	Syrio Forel/Superfan	6 June 2016	0.523
58	8	"No One"	Ian McElhinney	Barristan Selmy	13 June 2016	0.467
59	9	"Battle of the Bastards"	James Cosmo	Jeor Mormont	20 June 2016	0.572
60	10	"The Winds of Winter"	Kerry Ingram/Ian Beattie/Jonathan Ross/Stephen Mangan	Shireen Baratheon/Meryn Trant/Superfan/Superfan	27 June 2016	0.587

=== Series 7 (2017) ===
A pre-series multi-parter episode titled "War Room", filmed on location, was broadcast the week before the start of Series 7.

No. overall	No. in series	Episode	Guest(s)	Role(s)	Original release date	Viewers (millions)
61	–	"War Room"	Al Murray/Lauren Laverne/Jonathan Ross	Superfan	12 July 2017	0.262
62	1	"Dragonstone"	Iwan Rheon/Jimmy Carr/Edith Bowman	Ramsay Bolton/Superfan	17 July 2017	0.598
63	2	"Stormborn"	Dean-Charles Chapman/Tom Davis/Rickie Haywood Williams	Tommen Baratheon/Superfan	24 July 2017	0.589
64	3	"The Queen's Justice"	Kristian Nairn/Simon Neil/Grace Dent	Hodor/Superfan	31 July 2017	0.669
65	4	"The Spoils of War"	Clive Russell/Ian Beattie/Al Murray	Brynden Tully/Meryn Trant/Superfan	7 August 2017	0.690
66	5	"Eastwatch"	Owen Teale/Julian Glover/Caitlin Moran	Alliser Thorne/Pycelle/Superfan	14 August 2017	0.640
67	6	"Beyond the Wall"	Michael McElhatton/Elizabeth Webster/Ade Adepitan	Roose Bolton/Walda Bolton/Superfan	21 August 2017	0.755
68	7	"The Dragon and the Wolf"	Hannah Waddingham/Eugene Simon/Jonathan Ross	Septa Unella/Lancel Lannister/Superfan	28 August 2017	0.788

=== Series 8 (2019) ===
Two specials aired before Series 8: "Gameshow of Thrones" featuring a number of stars of the show with superfans, plus "War Room" featuring superfans Al Murray, Lauren Laverne and Jonathan Ross.

The series finale includes a special 30-minute pre-show episode titled "The End is Coming", and a 70-minute post-show episode. These episodes incorporated an additional studio segment titled "Littlefinger's Establishment", where Jamie East talked to stars of the show and superfans about their memories of working on the show.

Episode 3 of Series 8 was the most viewed episode of Thronecast according to BARB figures.

No. overall	No. in series	Episode	Guest(s)	Role(s)	Original release date	Viewers (millions)
69	–	"Gameshow of Thrones"	Hannah Waddingham/Kate Dickie/Rob Beckett/Joel Dommett/Rickie Haywood/Jonathan Ross	Septa Unella/Lysa Arryn/Superfan	30 March 2019	0.094 [4 April 2019 repeat]
70	–	"War Room"	Al Murray/Lauren Laverne/Jonathan Ross	Superfan	8 April 2019	0.204
71	1	"Winterfell"	Dara Ó Briain/James Faulkner/Natalia Tena	Superfan/Randyll Tarly/Osha	15 April 2019	0.689
72	2	"A Knight of the Seven Kingdoms"	Charles Dance/Jordan Banjo/Russell Tovey	Tywin Lannister/Superfan	22 April 2019	0.677
73	3	"The Long Night"	Kristian Nairn/Al Murray/Ellie Taylor	Hodor/Superfan	29 April 2019	0.904
74	4	"The Last of the Starks"	Miltos Yerolemou/Rickie Haywood-Williams/Melvin Odoom	Syrio Forel/Superfan	6 May 2019	0.666
75	5	"The Bells"	Hannah Waddingham/Professor Green/Phil Wang	Septa Unella/Superfan	13 May 2019	0.831
76	6	"Thronecast: The End is Coming"	Al Murray/Lauren Laverne/Jimmy Carr	Superfan	20 May 2019	0.514
77	7	"The Iron Throne"	Mark Addy/Ian Beattie/Kerry Ingram/Pixie Le Knot/Brenock O'Connor/Eugene Simon/Hannah Waddingham/Miltos Yerolemou/Tommy Dunne/Jimmy Carr/Giggs/Lauren Laverne/Al Murray	Robert Baratheon/Meryn Trant/Shireen Baratheon/Kayla/Olly/Lancel Lannister/Septa Unella/Syrio Forel/Weapons master/Superfan	20 May 2019	0.711

== See also ==
- After the Thrones – a similar talk show hosted by Andy Greenwald and Chris Ryan which also discusses episodes of Game of Thrones.
- Talking Dead – a similar talk show hosted by Chris Hardwick which discusses episodes of The Walking Dead and Fear the Walking Dead.
- Talking Bad – a similar talk show hosted by Hardwick which discussed episodes of Breaking Bad's fifth series.
- Talking Saul – a similar talk show hosted by Hardwick which discusses episodes of Better Call Saul.
- Talking Preacher – a similar talk show hosted by Hardwick which discusses episodes of Preacher.
