= Game of Thrones: Season 5 (soundtrack) =

Soundtrack album by Ramin Djawadi
- Released: June 9, 2015
- Genre: Soundtrack
- Length: 58:40
- Label: WaterTower Music
- Producer: Ramin Djawadi

Ramin Djawadi soundtrack chronology
Game of Thrones: Season 4 (2014)	Game of Thrones: Season 5 (2015)	Warcraft (2016)

The soundtrack album of the fifth season of HBO series Game of Thrones, titled Game of Thrones: Season 5, was released digitally on June 9, 2015, and on CD on July 17, 2015. The album was composed by Ramin Djawadi.

== Reception ==
The soundtrack received positive reviews from critics.

== Track listing ==
No.	Title	Key scenes/Notes	Length
1.	"Main Titles"	Used in the opening sequence.	1:45
2.	"Blood of the Dragon"	"The Dance of Dragons": Used in the end credits. A variation of "Breaker of Chains" combined with the track "Finale" from season 1's soundtrack. A longer version is used on the main menu of season 5's DVD/Blu-ray release.	1:33
3.	"House of Black and White"	"High Sparrow": Interiors from the House of Black and White are introduced. "Unbowed, Unbent, Unbroken": Arya washes a corpse. Afterwards, she deceives a sick girl and gives her the temple's poisoned water so she can die. As a reward for her act, Arya is introduced to a huge chamber where the Faceless Men store the faces of all the people that have died in the temple. "Hardhome": Arya assumes the identity of an oyster seller called Lanna and is ordered by Jaqen to learn everything about a life insurance salesman before poisoning him. "The Dance of Dragons": Arya, again under the identity of Lanna, sees Meryn Trant who is escorting Lord Mace Tyrell, and she ignores her mission to follow Mace and Trant. "Mother's Mercy": After having killed Meryn Trant, Arya comes back to the House of Black and White, where she is reprimanded by Jaqen and the Waif. "Home": When Jaqen brings back Arya to the House of Black and White. "Oathbreaker": Heard during Arya's training with the Waif.	5:08
4.	"Jaws of the Viper"	House Martell's theme. "Two Swords": When Oberyn tells Tyrion that the Lannisters are not the only one to pay their debts. "Mother's Mercy": After telling Jaime she is glad that he is her father, Myrcella starts bleeding; at the same time, Ellaria bleeds as well and drinks the antidote as she and the Sand Snakes stand on the pier watching the ship sail away. Also contains Jamie Lannister's theme ("Kingslayer").	2:31
5.	"Hardhome Pt. 1"	"Hardhome": The White Walkers ambush Hardhome. Contains melodies from "Three Blasts" and "Let's Kill Some Crows", and variations of the main title theme and the White Walkers' theme ("White Walkers").	5:06
6.	"Hardhome Pt. 2"	"Hardhome": Used in the battle at Hardhome. Begin just after Jon Snow kills the White Walker. Contains subtle variations of "Warrior of Light", as well as a sorrowful rendition of the Night's Watch theme ("Wall of Ice") and the White Walkers' theme ("White Walkers").	4:31
7.	"Mother's Mercy"	"Mother's Mercy": Cersei is stripped and shaved, and takes her Walk of Atonement. The cue contains variation of the House Lannister theme ("A Lannister Always Pays His Debts").	2:14
8.	"Kill the Boy"	"High Sparrow": Jon Snow executes Janos Slynt. It is a faster variation of "Pay the Iron Price" and the Night's Watch theme. The title shares its name with the name of episode five, and it comes from Maester Aemon's line to Jon Snow: "Kill the boy, and let the man be born." Contains the melody of "Pay the Iron Price".	2:07
9.	"Dance of Dragons"	"The Dance of Dragons": Drogon arrives at the fighting pit, rescues Daenerys and her followers from the Sons of the Harpy. He flies off with Daenerys riding on his back for the first time. The track contains combined variations of "Dracarys" and "Breaker of Chains" from the seasons 3 and 4 soundtracks.	3:08
10.	"Kneel for No Man"	"The Wars to Come": Jon Snow mercy kills Mance Rayder with an arrow after Stannis Baratheon condemns him to be burned at the stake. Contains a slow rendition of "Warrior of Light". "Hardhome": During Jon Snow's speech to the Wildling elders at Hardhome.	4:45
11.	"High Sparrow"	The High Sparrow's theme. "High Sparrow": A variant is heard when the High Septon is taken by the Sparrows and forced to walk naked through the streets of King's Landing while calling him a sinner. "Sons of the Harpy": First fully heard when the Sparrows, after being legitimized as the Faith Militant, attack both the black market in King's Landing and one of Petyr Baelish's brothels, and also apprehend Loras Tyrell because of his homosexuality. The beginning of the song is also heard when Tommen Baratheon unsuccessfully tries to talk with the High Sparrow and the population of the city insults him. "Unbowed, Unbent, Unbroken": A dramatic variant is heard when Loras and Margaery are arrested by the Faith Militant. "The Gift": the same variant, with added choirs, is heard when the High Sparrow indirectly admits to Cersei knowing of her affair with Lancel Lannister, a Sparrow himself, and has her arrested.	3:23
12.	"Before the Old Gods"	"Unbowed, Unbent, Unbroken": Sansa is wed to Ramsay Bolton. The track is built upon a slow and disturbingly twisted variation of the wedding theme from the track "I Am Hers, She Is Mine" from season 2's soundtrack.	2:37
13.	"Atonement"	"The Wars to Come": Cersei and Jaime talk over Tywin's corpse in the Sept of Baelor. It is a dirgelike lament variation of the "Rains of Castamere" theme.	2:54
14.	"I Dreamt I Was Old"	"The Gift": Maester Aemon dies and Sam eulogizes him before lighting his funeral pyre. Contains a sorrowful variation of the Night's Watch theme. The title comes from Maester Aemon's last sentence before his death: "Egg, I dreamt that I was old."	2:16
15.	"The Wars to Come"	"Mother's Mercy": Sansa begins her escape attempt and Stannis prepares to charge Winterfell and faces down the Bolton army. The cue is divided in two sections: the first one is a sorrowful rendition of the House Stark theme; the second one predominantly feature variations of Stannis Baratheon's theme ("Warrior of Light"), introduces House Bolton's theme and also contains a melody associated with Catelyn Stark and later with Brienne of Tarth ("The Old Gods and the New").	4:48
16.	"Forgive Me"	"The Dance of Dragons": Melisandre burns Shireen at the stake as a sacrifice. "Mother's Mercy": Melisandre returns to Castle Black. "The Red Woman": Melisandre, Davos and some men of the Night's Watch stare at Jon Snow's corpse. "Battle of the Bastards": Davos finds the little wooden deer he offered to Shireen in the burnt pyre. It contains more variations of "Warrior of Light". The title comes from Stannis's line before he orders Shireen's death.	3:17
17.	"Son of the Harpy"	The Sons of the Harpy's theme. "The House of Black and White": Daario Naharis and Grey Worm find a hiding Son of the Harpy. "Sons of the Harpy": The Sons of the Harpy battle the Unsullied and Daenerys' bodyguards. "The Dance of Dragons": The Sons of the Harpy attack Daenerys and Meereen citizens in Daznak's Pit. "No One" and "Battle of the Bastards": When the Masters attack Meereen. The track contains the Sons of the Harpy's theme and hints & variations of Daenerys's theme ("Love in the Eyes" and "Mhysa").	5:17
18.	"Throne for the Game" (featuring Bradley Hanan Carter)	Unused in the series. A male vocal rendition of the main title theme.	1:20
Total length:			58:40

== Credits and personnel ==
Personnel adapted from the album liner notes.

- David Benioff – liner notes
- Ramin Djawadi – composer, primary artist, producer
- Czech Film Orchestra and Choir – primary artist
- Bradley Hanan Carter – featured artist
- D.B. Weiss – liner notes
