= Game of Thrones (franchise) =

American fantasy media franchise

- Owners: HBO; Warner Bros.
- Years: 2011–present
- Based on: A Song of Ice and Fire by George R. R. Martin

Print publications
- Books: List of books

Films and television
- Film: Game of Thrones: Aegon's Conquest
- Television series: Game of Thrones; House of the Dragon; A Knight of the Seven Kingdoms

Theatrical presentations
- Play: Game of Thrones: The Mad King

Games
- Traditional: List of tabletop games
- Video games: List of video games

Audio
- Soundtrack: Music of Game of Thrones

Miscellaneous
- Exhibition: List of exhibits

Game of Thrones (sometimes referred to as World of Westeros) is an American fantasy media franchise derived from the HBO television series of the same name, based on the A Song of Ice and Fire novel series and other related works by American author George R. R. Martin.

Several adaptations based on the stories, settings, and characters in the fictional universe have been made. The first television adaptation, Game of Thrones, which premiered in April 2011, holds the record for most Emmy Award wins for a scripted television series and for most Emmy nominations for a drama series. It also won a prestigious Peabody Award in 2011. The show set various viewership records domestically and internationally, with the final season averaging 46 million viewership across multiple platforms. HBO has acquired the television rights to the novels, with David Benioff and D. B. Weiss serving as the showrunners. Following the success of Game of Thrones and its conclusion in 2019, additional spin-off shows have been made. House of the Dragon, a prequel to Game of Thrones and based on parts of Martin's 2018 book Fire & Blood, premiered in August 2022, with Ryan Condal and Miguel Sapochnik serving as showrunners. In January 2026, A Knight of the Seven Kingdoms, another prequel series, based on Martin's Tales of Dunk and Egg novella series, premiered on HBO, with Ira Parker serving as the showrunner.

In 2026, Warner Bros. Pictures announced that a feature film covering "Aegon's Conquest", the first chapter in Fire & Blood, is currently in the works, with the working title Game of Thrones: Aegon's Conquest and set for release in June 2029. In the same year, a stage play titled Game of Thrones: The Mad King, presented by the Royal Shakespeare Company in partnership with Warner Bros. Theatre Ventures, premiered at the Royal Shakespeare Theatre in Stratford-upon-Avon, England, directed by Dominic Cooke.

Several instrumental soundtrack albums, composed by Ramin Djawadi, have been released for both Game of Thrones and House of the Dragon. A concert tour was held in various North American and European cities from 2017 to 2019. Fictional languages have also been created specifically for the show adaptations. American language creator David J. Peterson developed the Dothraki and Valyrian languages based on a few words and phrases written by Martin in his published novels.

Tabletop games and video games inspired by Game of Thrones and House of the Dragon were released over the years. Book tie-ins were also published detailing the behind-the-scenes for both shows. A convention and multiple exhibitions were organized by HBO which showcased props, costumes, and original sets used in the filming of Game of Thrones. Throughout the years, various product lines and companies have partnered with HBO for licensed merchandise and cross-promotion of the shows in the franchise.

== Television ==
Three television series make up the Game of Thrones live-action franchise: Game of Thrones, House of the Dragon, and A Knight of the Seven Kingdoms. All series in total amount to 105 episodes across 12 seasons of television.

Series	Season	Episodes	Originally released		Showrunner(s)	Status
Series	Season	Episodes	First released	Last released	Showrunner(s)	Status
Game of Thrones	1	10	April 17, 2011	June 19, 2011	D. B. Weiss & David Benioff	Concluded
Game of Thrones	2	10	April 1, 2012	June 3, 2012	D. B. Weiss & David Benioff	Concluded
Game of Thrones	3	10	March 31, 2013	June 9, 2013	D. B. Weiss & David Benioff	Concluded
Game of Thrones	4	10	April 6, 2014	June 15, 2014	D. B. Weiss & David Benioff	Concluded
Game of Thrones	5	10	April 12, 2015	June 14, 2015	D. B. Weiss & David Benioff	Concluded
Game of Thrones	6	10	April 24, 2016	June 26, 2016	D. B. Weiss & David Benioff	Concluded
Game of Thrones	7	7	July 16, 2017	August 27, 2017	D. B. Weiss & David Benioff	Concluded
Game of Thrones	8	6	April 14, 2019	May 19, 2019	D. B. Weiss & David Benioff	Concluded
House of the Dragon	1	10	August 21, 2022	October 23, 2022	Ryan Condal & Miguel Sapochnik	Released
House of the Dragon	2	8	June 16, 2024	August 4, 2024	Ryan Condal	Released
House of the Dragon	3	8	June 21, 2026	August 9, 2026	Ryan Condal	Released
House of the Dragon	4	TBA	2028	TBA	Ryan Condal	In development
A Knight of the Seven Kingdoms	1	6	January 18, 2026	February 22, 2026	Ira Parker	Released
A Knight of the Seven Kingdoms	2	TBA	2027	TBA	Ira Parker	Post-production

=== Game of Thrones (2011–2019) ===
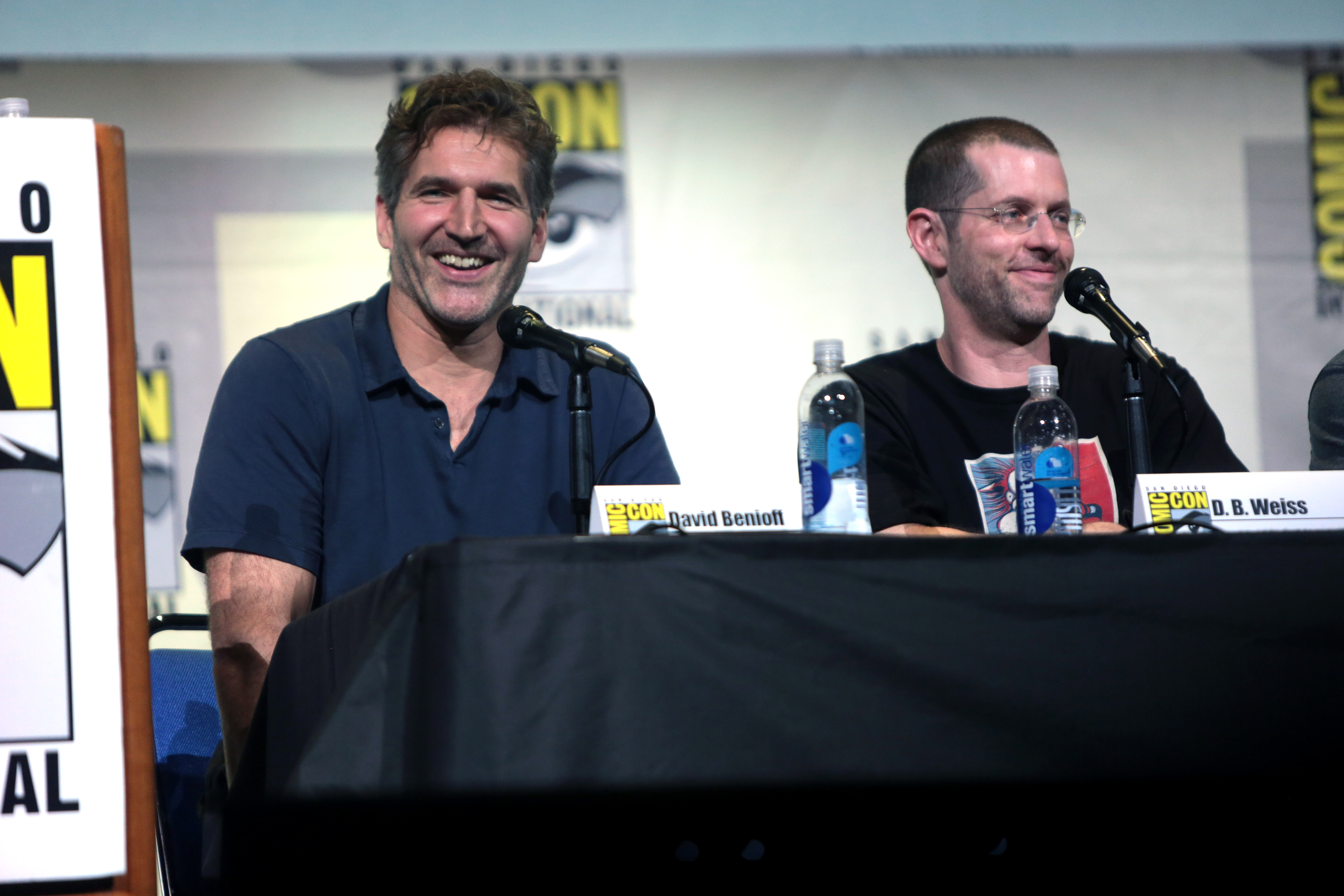
Game of Thrones showrunners D.B. Weiss and David Benioff.

Game of Thrones is roughly based on the storylines of the A Song of Ice and Fire book series by George R. R. Martin, set in the fictional Seven Kingdoms of Westeros and the continent of Essos. The series began development in January 2007. HBO acquired the television rights to the novels, with David Benioff and D. B. Weiss as the series' executive producers and Martin as a co-executive producer. The intention was for each novel to yield a season's worth of episodes. For filming, the show was shot in multiple countries: United Kingdom, Canada, Croatia, Iceland, Malta, Morocco, and Spain. Nina Gold and Robert Sterne were the series' primary casting directors. Through a process of auditions and readings, the main cast was assembled. The only exceptions were Peter Dinklage and Sean Bean, whom the writers wanted from the start; they were announced as joining the pilot in 2009. The series premiered on April 17, 2011. A critical and commercial success, it ran for eight seasons, concluding in 2019.

Game of Thrones was considered a ratings success for HBO throughout all eight seasons. The season five episode "The House of Black and White" was simulcasted in 173 countries, becoming the "largest TV drama telecast" according to Guinness World Records. It also pulled in an average of 46 million viewers across its eighth and final season in 2019, setting the record for the most-watched show on HBO. The show's success has been credited with an increase in the fantasy genre's popularity. The show's success led to the commissioning of several fantasy television series, including The Wheel of Time and The Lord of the Rings: The Rings of Power by Amazon Studios. According to Neil Gaiman, whose novels Good Omens and American Gods were adapted for television, Game of Thrones helped to change attitudes towards fantasy on television, but mainly it made big budgets for fantasy series more acceptable.

==== Language creation ====
The books describe numerous languages spoken in the fictional world of A Song of Ice and Fire, among them are Dothraki and High Valyrian. For the show, HBO selected the American language creator, David J. Peterson, through a competition among conlangers. The producers gave Peterson a largely free hand in developing the languages based on only a few words of High Valyrian (valar morghulis, valar dohaeris, dracarys) and Dothraki (khalasar, khaleesi) written by Martin in his books. In 2014, Living Language released a conversational language course of Dothraki through a book and CD package accompanied with a companion mobile app and an expanded online version. High Vayrian, on the other hand, is offered as a free course on the language app, Duolingo.

=== House of the Dragon (2022–present) ===
In 2015, with Game of Thrones still in production, HBO executives approached Martin regarding possible successors or spin-offs to the series. In November 2018, Martin stated that a "potential spin-off series would be solidly based on material in Fire & Blood." Game of Thrones creators Benioff and Weiss stated they wanted to "move on" from the franchise and declined involvement in subsequent projects. By September 2019, a Game of Thrones prequel series from Martin and Condal that "tracks the beginning of the end for House Targaryen" was close to receiving a pilot order from HBO. In October 2019, House of the Dragon was given a straight-to-series order. Condal and Sapochnik, who won an Emmy Award for directing the episode "Battle of the Bastards", were selected to serve as showrunners.

House of the Dragon serves as a prequel to the television series Game of Thrones and is the second television series in the franchise. It is based on Martin's 2018 novel Fire & Blood. The series is set two hundred years before the events of Game of Thrones and chronicles the events leading up to the House Targaryen civil war, known as the "Dance of the Dragons", and the war itself. The first season of the series premiered in 2022 and consists of ten episodes.

=== A Knight of the Seven Kingdoms (2026–present) ===
In February 2013, Martin commented that he had been in discussions with HBO regarding a potential adaptation of his Dunk and Egg novellas. In March 2014, Martin expressed interest in adapting his Dunk and Egg stories for the screen, suggesting that they could serve as the basis for a film. In July 2015, HBO programming president Michael Lombardo remarked that there was "enormous storytelling to be mined" in a prequel to Game of Thrones. A Knight of the Seven Kingdoms series received an official order from HBO in April 2023. By then, Ira Parker, a writer on the first season of House of the Dragon, had already written the script for a pilot episode. Peter Claffey was cast as Ser Duncan the Tall and Dexter Sol Ansell as Egg. The first season of the series premiered in 2026 and consisted of six episodes.

A Knight of the Seven Kingdoms is based on The Hedge Knight, the first novella in the prequel series Tales of Dunk and Egg. The story is set a century before the events of Game of Thrones and follows the adventures of a knight, Ser Duncan the Tall, and his squire, Egg.

=== Reception ===
==== Critical response ====
Critical response of A Song of Ice and Fire series
Title	Season	Rotten Tomatoes	Metacritic
Game of Thrones	1	90% (215 reviews)	80 (28 reviews)
Game of Thrones	2	97% (293 reviews)	90 (26 reviews)
Game of Thrones	3	97% (569 reviews)	91 (25 reviews)
Game of Thrones	4	97% (571 reviews)	94 (29 reviews)
Game of Thrones	5	93% (556 reviews)	91 (29 reviews)
Game of Thrones	6	94% (666 reviews)	73 (9 reviews)
Game of Thrones	7	93% (479 reviews)	77 (12 reviews)
Game of Thrones	8	55% (698 reviews)	75 (13 reviews)
House of the Dragon	1	90% (875 reviews)	69 (43 reviews)
House of the Dragon	2	84% (283 reviews)	73 (40 reviews)
House of the Dragon	3	92% (108 reviews)	76 (26 reviews)
A Knight of the Seven Kingdoms	1	94% (163 reviews)	74 (37 reviews)

Game of Thrones, particularly the first five seasons, received acclaim, although the show's frequent use of nudity and violence was criticized. The series has an overall rating of 89% on Rotten Tomatoes and a score of 86 on Metacritic, indicating "universal acclaim". Some critics and publications have called the show among the best HBO series of all time. Reviewers of the first season said the series had high production values, a fully realized world and compelling characters. According to Variety, "There may be no show more profitable to its network than Game of Thrones is to HBO. Fully produced by the pay cable and already a global phenomenon after only one season, the fantasy skein was a gamble that has paid off handsomely." According to The Hollywood Reporter, the series made a "strong case for being one of TV's best series"; its seriousness made it the only drama comparable to Mad Men or Breaking Bad. However, towards the final two seasons, due to lack of new material from the books, the series became less character-driven and more reliant on big twists and spectacle. These seasons, especially season eight, received more criticism. Season seven was praised for its action sequences and focused central characters, but received criticism for its pace and plot developments that were said to have "defied logic".

House of the Dragon received favorable reviews from most critics. On the review aggregator website, Rotten Tomatoes, the first season holds an approval rating of 90% based on 873 reviews, with an average rating of 7.85/10. The website's critical consensus reads, "Covering an era of tenuous peace with ferocious – albeit abbreviated – focus, House of the Dragon is an impressive prequel that exemplifies the court intrigue that distinguished its predecessor." On Metacritic, which uses a weighted average, the first season received a score of 69 out of 100 based on 43 critic reviews, indicating "generally favorable reviews". Lorraine Ali of Los Angeles Times said, "The exchange between mother and daughter, and the artful contrast of dueling knights and dutiful midwives, are powerful enough on their own to render the first episode a smashing success and show that House of the Dragon has a depth of understanding of its female characters that GoT took years to find."

A Knight of the Seven Kingdoms received widespread praise. The review aggregator website, Rotten Tomatoes, reported a 94% approval rating, based on 176 critic reviews, with an average rating of 8.25/10. The website's critics consensus reads: "A Knight of the Seven Kingdoms is a welcome return to Westeros that works better in the buddy-comedy arena rather than solely slaying its competition." Neil Amstrong of the BBC called the series "a total delight from start to finish", rating it five stars. He commended the leads' performances, writing that Claffey and Ansell were "brilliant" and had "extraordinary" chemistry". Daniel Fienberg of The Hollywood Reporter praised the series' scale, calling it a "smaller, smarter, funnier and more charming glimpse into George R.R. Martin's bigger-is-better realm".

==== Accolades ====
Game of Thrones has won numerous awards throughout its run, including 59 Emmy Awards and a Peabody Award. It holds the record for total Emmy Award wins for a scripted television series and for most Emmy nominations for a drama series, with 161. In 2013, the Writers Guild of America listed Game of Thrones as the 40th best written series in television history. In 2015, The Hollywood Reporter placed it at number four on their best TV shows ever list, while in 2016 the series was placed seventh on Empire's "The 50 best TV shows ever". The same year, Rolling Stone named it the twelfth "greatest TV Show of all time". In 2023, Variety ranked Game of Thrones No. 21 on its list of the 100 greatest TV shows of all time. In 2026, The New York Times placed it at 6th on its "100 Best TV Shows of the 21st Century" list.

House of the Dragon received nine Primetime Emmy Awards nominations in 2023, including Outstanding Drama Series, winning one for Outstanding Fantasy/Sci-Fi Costumes. The series won the Golden Globe Award Best Television Series – Drama in 2023, while Emma D'Arcy earned two Best Actress in a Television Series – Drama nominations in 2023 and 2025. Other nominations include three Critics' Choice Awards, and two Screen Actors Guild Awards.

A Knight of the Seven Kingdoms received nine Emmy nominations in 2026, including Outstanding Drama Series, and won the award for Outstanding Stunt Performance for the fifth episode of season 1, "In the Name of the Mother", which honored stunt performers Zach Roberts, Gyula Tóth, Chris Cox, and Jake Cox.

=== Further spin-offs ===
In 2021, three spin-off shows were announced to be in development at HBO. They included Nine Voyages, 10,000 Ships, and Flea Bottom. Nine Voyages was initially developed as a live-action series, but in December 2023, Martin confirmed on his blog that it has shifted into animation. Genndy Tartakovsky, best known for Dexter's Laboratory, Samurai Jack, and Star Wars: Clone Wars, was reportedly attached to the project. 10,000 Ships, a spin-off about the warrior queen Princess Nymeria, will be set 1,000 years before the events of Game of Thrones. In an August 2022 interview with The New York Times, George R.R. Martin described the project to be in comparable scale as the Odyssey and in a 2024 blog post, he announced that Pulitzer-winning playwright Eboni Booth was writing the pilot. On the other hand, Flea Bottom, a project based on the infamous King’s Landing slum, was reportedly cancelled. An additional animated spin-off show was announced on July 2021, set in The Golden Empire of Yi Ti, a region in the continent of Essos. The society is considered one of the oldest and most advanced in Martin’s fantasy realm and is inspired by Imperial China.

In June 2022, it was reported that a Jon Snow sequel series with Kit Harington to reprise his role was in early development at HBO. The working title was Snow and Martin confirmed his involvement with the project and that Harington initiated the idea. In April 2024, Harington stated the show had been shelved because they could not find a story that excited them enough. In 2026, however, the project was revived with Drops of God writer Quoc Dang Tran reportedly working on the potential sequel. The project was described as being in "very early development" and may still be shelved again, as The Hollywood Reporter reports that HBO is aware of the high expectations for the project.

Multiple ideas for successor series have not continued into production. In 2018, HBO announced a pilot order for a show with the working title of Bloodmoon, said to focus on the “Age of Heroes” and the first-ever battle between men and White Walkers. Jane Goldman, who worked on Kick-Ass (2010) and Kingsman: The Secret Service (2014), served as both the principal writer and showrunner. Naomi Watts and Josh Whitehouse were announced as co-leads in October 2018. A pilot episode was reportedly shot in 2019 for $30 million to $35 million. HBO ultimately scrapped the project stating that it "required a lot more invention" and "didn’t have that depth and richness that the original series’ pilot did". Other pitches at HBO including a series about the fabled Seven Gods as mortals who had adventures then came to be worshipped as gods and a series about the Doom of Valyria, written by Max Borenstein, were also scrapped.

=== Television specials ===
==== Documentaries ====
Series	Seasons	Episodes	Originally released		Featured behind-the-scenes media
Series	Seasons	Episodes	First released	Last released	Featured behind-the-scenes media
Documentary series
The House that Dragons Built	3	26	August 22, 2022	August 10, 2026	All seasons of House of the Dragon
A Knight in the Making	1	6	January 19, 2026	February 23, 2026	All seasons of A Knight of the Seven Kingdoms
Documentary film
Game of Thrones: A Day in the Life	Short film		February 8, 2015		Game of Thrones season 5
Game of Thrones: The Last Watch	Feature film		May 26, 2019		Game of Thrones season 8

==== Aftershows ====
Thronecast: The Official Guide to Game of Thrones, a series of episodes presented by Geoff Lloyd and produced by Koink, was released on the Sky Atlantic website and the UK iTunes store during the series' run; a new episode, with analysis and cast interviews, was released after each Game of Thrones episode. After the Thrones was a live aftershow during which hosts Andy Greenwald and Chris Ryan discussed episodes of the series. It aired on HBO Now, the Monday following each season six episode.

==== Podcasts ====
The Official Game of Thrones Podcast is a series of podcasts that feature the latest news, weekly commentaries, and exclusive interviews with the cast and crew of all the shows in the franchise. According to HBO Max, the goal is to offer "companion experiences, behind‑the‑scenes access and creator‑led conversations alongside its series and movies," kicking off "a new era of immersive fandom". To date, the series has launched The Game of Thrones Anniversary Podcast Special, A Knight of the Seven Kingdoms Podcast, and The Game of Thrones Podcast: House of the Dragon.

==== Featurettes ====
Histories & Lore is a series of short animated videos detailing the mythology of Westeros and Essos as told from the varying perspectives of the characters in Game of Thrones. It is available as an extra feature on the DVD/Blu-ray release for each season of the show. The narrations are provided by the cast members of the show, while the illustrations are from storyboard artist Will Simpson. HBO has also released the long-form animations The Dance of Dragons and Conquest & Rebellion: An Animated History of the Seven Kingdoms exclusively for seasons five and seven Blu-ray releases, respectively. The narrations were provided by the Game of Thrones cast members as well.

== Film ==
Game of Thrones films
Film	Release date	Directed by	Screenplay by	Produced by
Game of Thrones: Aegon's Conquest	June 1, 2029	Owen Harris	Beau Willimon	TBA

=== Game of Thrones: Aegon's Conquest ===
On April 14, 2026, Warner Bros. announced at CinemaCon in Las Vegas that a feature film about Aegon's Conquest is in the works, based on the first chapters of Martin's Fire & Blood. The film is set to be written by Beau Willimon. The working title Game of Thrones: Aegon's Conquest was also confirmed. This will serve as the franchise's first-ever big-screen entry.

On September 29, 2026, Warner Bros. announced that the film would be released on June 1, 2029. Owen Harris is set to direct.

== Theatre ==
=== Game of Thrones: The Mad King ===
Production	Venue	First preview	Opening night	Closing night
Stratford-upon-Avon	Royal Shakespeare Theatre	July 28, 2026	August 8, 2026	September 5, 2026
West End (London)	TBA			

A stage play called Game of Thrones: The Mad King by the Royal Shakespeare Company, in partnership with Warner Bros. Theatre Ventures, had its world premiere on August 8, 2026, at the Royal Shakespeare Theatre in Stratford-upon-Avon, England. The play is set just before the events in Martin's A Song of Ice and Fire novels and will follow the great houses of Westeros during the reign of the Mad King Aerys. It is written by Duncan Macmillan and directed by Dominic Cooke. In September 2026, the Royal Shakespeare Company, along with George R. R. Martin, announced that the stage play will open in London in 2027.

The stage play was strongly praised by the critics, especially the production. Sarah Crompton of WhatsOnStage gave the play five stars stating that it is "an extraordinary moment of theatre: a procession of rich coloured silks and fluttering banners, with kings and princes riding life sized armoured horses, heads tossing as they move, a scrappy dog silhouetted barking at the scene". Mark Lawson of The Guardian wrote, "This prequel to the TV series has one joust after another, spectacular stagecraft and plenty of modern resonance". Chris McPherson from Collider agreed saying, "The opening Targaryen procession will live long in the memory, as they cross the stage on their horses with ominous music playing". Alice Saville of The Independent rated the play four out of five stars and wrote, "As well as drawing on the ancient Classics, this story of ambitious, vengeful kings has serious shades of Shakespeare – with added dragons. It feels right on this in-the-round, Elizabethan-inspired stage".

However, not all aspects of the play were positively received. Despite giving the play four stars, Dominic Cavendish of The Telegraph said, "At almost four hours, it’s a long evening, sometimes too dense with detail, and it lacks the grit and gore (not to mention the nudity) of the TV series". The sentiment on the play's length was shared by McPherson stating that the four hours run time of the play is too long yet still feels rushed on the second half. In a scathing review by The Times, Clive Davis gave the play three stars and wrote, "This prequel to a blood-soaked dynastic saga wanders on for so long that it makes Christopher Nolan’s journey into Greek mythology seem a model of understatement (...) only the most dedicated of [the fans] will have the energy for this marathon".

== Music ==
Year	Title	Composer	Ref(s)
2011	Game of Thrones: Season 1	Ramin Djawadi	
2012	Game of Thrones: Season 2	Ramin Djawadi	
2013	Game of Thrones: Season 3	Ramin Djawadi	
2014	Game of Thrones: Season 4	Ramin Djawadi	
2015	Game of Thrones: Season 5	Ramin Djawadi	
2016	Game of Thrones: Season 6	Ramin Djawadi	
2017	Game of Thrones: Season 7	Ramin Djawadi	
2019	Game of Thrones: Season 8	Ramin Djawadi	
2022	House of the Dragon: Season 1	Ramin Djawadi	
2024	House of the Dragon: Season 2	Ramin Djawadi	
2026	House of the Dragon: Season 3	Ramin Djawadi	
2026	A Knight of the Seven Kingdoms: Season 1	Dan Romer	

In 2011, Ramin Djawadi was selected to score Game of Thrones. Djawadi began composing the music for the show after he had watched the first two episodes of the series that the showrunners Benioff and Weiss sent him, and discussed the concepts of the show with them. After Djawadi was shown a preliminary animated Game of Thrones title sequence that the visual effect artists were still working on, he was inspired to write the piece. He said that he started humming what would become the theme tune in the car after seeing the visuals for the title sequence, and conceived of the idea for the theme on the drive back to his studio. The finished theme music was presented to the producer three days later. Soundtrack albums by Djawadi were released at the end of every season of Game of Thrones and House of the Dragon. A companion album, For the Throne: Music Inspired by the HBO Series Game of Thrones, comprising songs that are inspired by the show, was released in 2019. A single, "Power Is Power" by SZA, The Weeknd and Travis Scott, served as the lead single of the album.

=== Live Concert ===
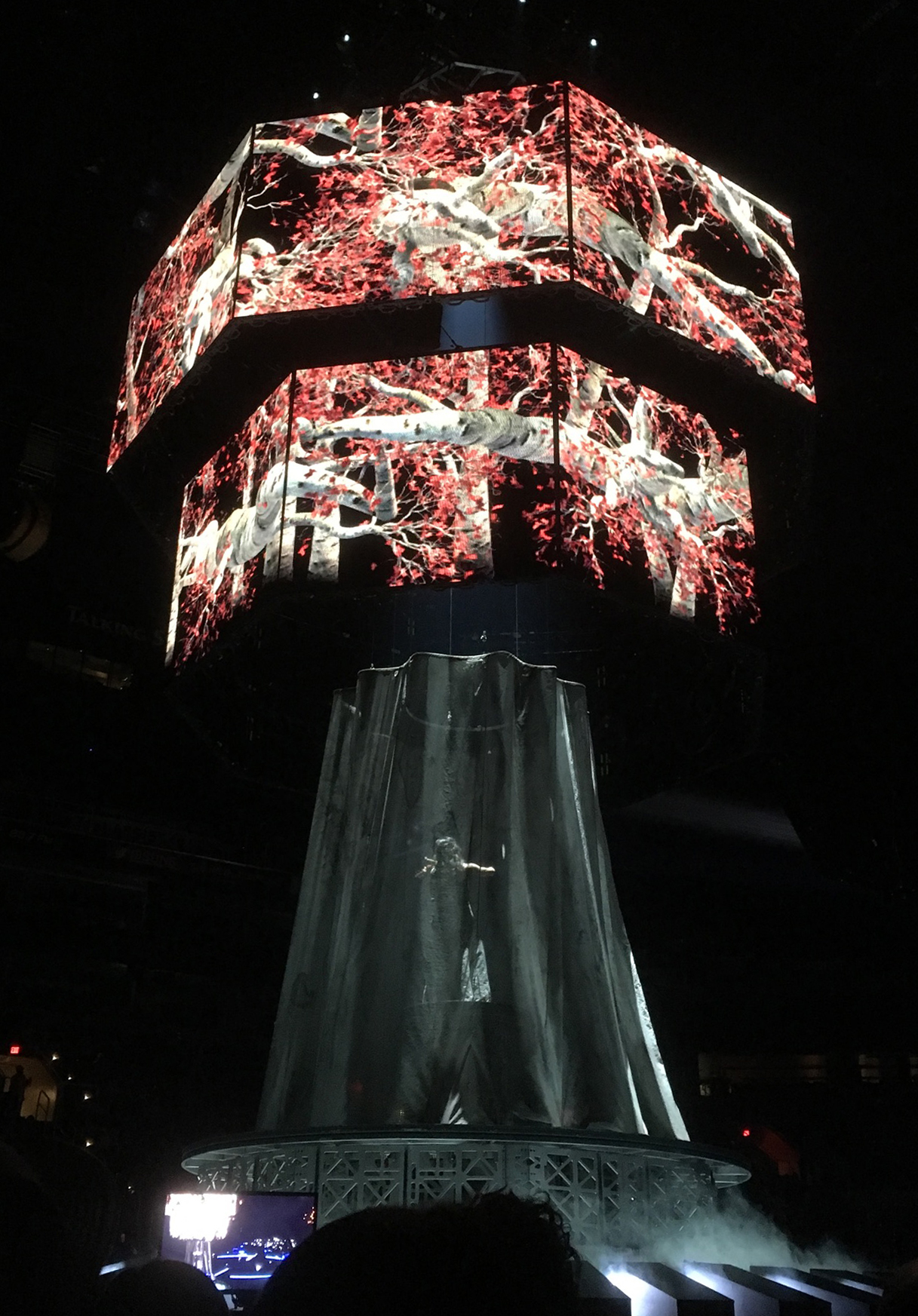
A weirwood tree on the stage during the Game of Thrones Live Concert Experience.

A concert tour, called Game of Thrones Live Concert Experience featuring the music of Game of Thrones took place in 2017. The tour involved an 80-piece orchestra, a choir, and seven custom 360-degree stages. Instruments were specially created for the tour, such as a 12-foot wildling horn played during the wildling attack on the Wall section. A tour was also arranged for cities in Europe and North America in 2018, with new music from season 7 added. In an interview, Djawadi talked about the tour, saying, "I'm going through the music to adapt it more for a live performance, and I might have a vocalist on a piece that didn't have one before, or lengthen another piece, I'm not bound to the picture anymore, so I can let the music tell its own story, and be creative about it."

The concert received positive reviews from the critics. Kim Renfro of Business Insider said, "The sequence of music chosen by Djawadi is not only chronologically matched with the show's seasons, but it was meant to force fans to relive both the best and worst moments of their favorite characters' stories". The Guardian gave a four out of five stars rating and wrote, "The ambitious event gives fans a musical tour though classic moments from the series and offers a few visual flourishes along the way". Spencer Kornhaber from The Atlantic praised the show format stating, "The action set pieces are served best by the concert’s visual and musical remixing". Martinez Alanna of Observer expressed that the concert is "a gift to fans" and "a raucous celebration of the show’s greatest moments and its MVP: the music". She further wrote, "Take away the Iron Throne, Jon Snow’s silky locks of shoulder length hair and dragons and you’re left with a spectacular musical score that rivals the work of legendary composers John Williams, Max Steiner and Danny Elfman".

== Publication ==
=== Tie-ins ===
Title	Publication date	Writer(s)	Ref.
Inside HBO's Game of Thrones	January 2012	Bryan Cogman, David Benioff & D.B. Weiss (Introduction), George R.R. Martin (Preface)	
Inside HBO's Game of Thrones (Collector's Edition)	November 2012	Bryan Cogman, David Benioff & D.B. Weiss (Introduction), George R.R. Martin (Preface)	
Game of Thrones: A Pop-Up Guide to Westeros	March 2014	Matthew Reinhart (Designer), Michael Komarck (Illustrator)	
Inside HBO's Game of Thrones: Seasons 3 & 4	October 2014	C.A. Taylor	
Game of Thrones: The Noble Houses of Westeros Seasons 1-5	October 2015	Cindy de la Hoz (Editor)	
HBO's Game of Thrones Coloring Book	November 2016	Allan Jefferson, Adriana Melo	
Game of Thrones: A Guide to Westeros and Beyond (The Complete Series)	January 2019	Myles McNutt	
Game of Thrones: The Storyboards	May 2019	William Simpson, Michael Kogge	
The Photography of Game of Thrones	November 2019	Helen Sloan, Michael Kogge, David Benioff & D.B. Weiss (Foreword)	
The Art of Game of Thrones	November 2019	Deborah Riley, Jody Revenson, David Benioff & D.B. Weiss (Foreword), Gemma Jackson (Preface)	
Game of Thrones: The Costumes	November 2019	Michele Clapton, Gina McIntyre, David Benioff & D.B. Weiss (Foreword)	
Fire Cannot Kill A Dragon: Game of Thrones and the Official Untold Story of the Epic Series	October 2020	James Hibberd	
House of the Dragon: Inside the Creation of a Targaryen Dynasty	December 2022	Gina McIntyre	
House of the Dragon: The Official Coloring Book	May 2024	Random House Worlds	
The Official Game of Thrones Cookbook: Recipes from King's Landing to the Dothraki Sea	May 2024	Chelsea Monroe-Cassel, George R.R. Martin (Foreword)	
The Official Westeros Cookbook: Recipes from Game of Thrones and House of the Dragon	October 2024	Cassandra Reeder	
House of the Dragon [Season 2]: Inside the Dawn of the Targaryen Civil War	December 2024	Gina McIntyre	

== Games ==
=== Tabletop games ===
In 2012, Fantasy Flight Games released the Game of Thrones: The Card Game for two players, which features characters, locations, events, and plots from the television adaptation. In 2014, they released another card game titled Game of Thrones: Westeros Intrigue, which is a game for two to six players where they deal character cards in an attempt to claim the Iron Throne for themselves.

In 2015, USAopoly (The Op Games) released Risk: Game of Thrones. It is a variant of the board game Risk with changes to incorporate the theme, such as maester cards, character cards, and new maps of Westeros and Essos. In the same year, they also launched the Monopoly: Game of Thrones Collector's Edition.

=== Video games ===
Following the success of the HBO TV series, Game of Thrones motivated the development of several video games. Game of Thrones Ascent, a freemium social network game, was made available by Disruptor Beam in 2013 on Facebook and Kongregate. It was made in collaboration with HBO and Martin. The game combines storytelling and strategy elements, allowing players to lead the life of a nobleman during the time of upheaval portrayed in the novels and the TV series. In 2014, Telltale Games produced a six-episode adventure game titled Game of Thrones: A Telltale Games Series.

There are also several fan-made modifications ("mods") to commercial video games that allow playing in the world of A Song of Ice and Fire. These include a total conversion for the strategy game Crusader Kings II, as well as the mods "War of the Usurper" for its predecessor Crusader Kings, "Westeros: Total War The Age of Petty Kings" for Medieval II: Total War, and "A Clash Of Kings" for Mount & Blade: Warband.

== Exhibits ==
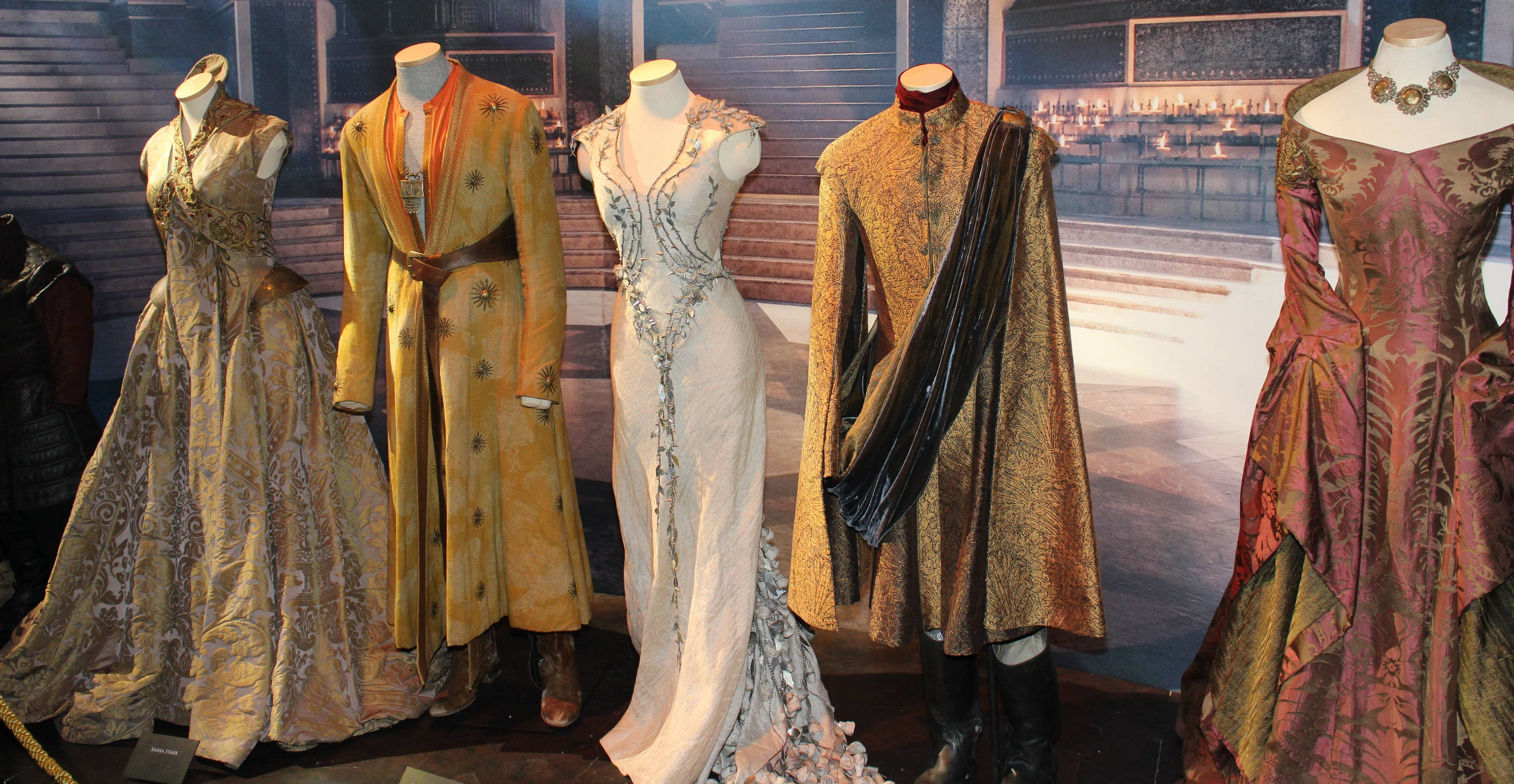
Costumes worn by the lords and ladies of the royal court in Game of Thrones, exhibited in Oslo, Norway in 2014.

- Game of Thrones: The Touring Exhibition – Organized by HBO Global Licensing and the GES Production Company, it was a 1,000-square-meter interactive experience inspired by the show, offering visitors to see the props, weapons, armor, costumes, and original sets that appeared on the screen. The exhibition was made up of several thematic areas representing locations in the series. Examples are the winter landscape of the North, the tree-lined King's Road, and the capital, King's Landing. The exhibit ran on different city stops worldwide from 2013 through 2019.
- Game of Thrones Museum – A 300-square-meter attraction in Split, Croatia that opened in May 2019. Over 100 items are on display, including replicas of weapons, costumes, and a dragon head. The museum also includes life-size character statues.
- Game of Thrones Studio Tour – A 110,000-square-foot exhibit in Northern Ireland that officially launched in 2022. Among the exhibits are visual development sketches, props, costumes, and sets, including the original Great Hall of Winterfell and Castle Black sets, which have remained in place since the show wrapped in 2019. There are also sneak peeks at the prosthetics and visual effects used in the show. In 2025, the studio partnered with Magic Memories, a global leader in experience capture for the attractions industry, to launch the "Dragon Ride Experience". This new attraction utilises advanced green screen video technology, enabling visitors to ride a dragon and soar over the landscapes of Westeros via VFX.
- House of the Dragon: The Targaryen Dynasty – A 2,500-square-foot exhibit at the Natural History Museum of Los Angeles County that opened from August 5 to September 7, 2022. The exhibit, serving as a promo for the television series House of the Dragon, featured props and costumes, tutorials on the Valyrian language, and a replica of the show's version of the Iron Throne.
- Game of Thrones: The Exhibition (Arlington, TX) – A Game of Thrones exhibit in the Arlington Museum of Art that ran from October 2025 to April 2026. It showcased an immersive collection of original costumes worn by the iconic characters, props from the show, and a behind-the-scenes look at the development of the 2011 series.

== Convention ==
The Game of Thrones Official Fan Convention was a Warner Bros. and HBO-sanctioned event, in partnership with Creation Entertainment, held at the Los Angeles Convention Center from December 9–11, 2022. It featured Game of Thrones stars Kit Harington, Alfie Allen, Jack Gleeson, Kristofer Hivju, Kristian Nairn, Daniel Portman, Gemma Whelan, and Isaac Hempstead Wright.. The convention also featured panel discussions, meet and greets, autograph signings, exclusive merchandise, cosplay, and trivia competitions. Originally scheduled for February 2022, the official event was held to promote the prequel show House of the Dragon.

== Merchandise ==
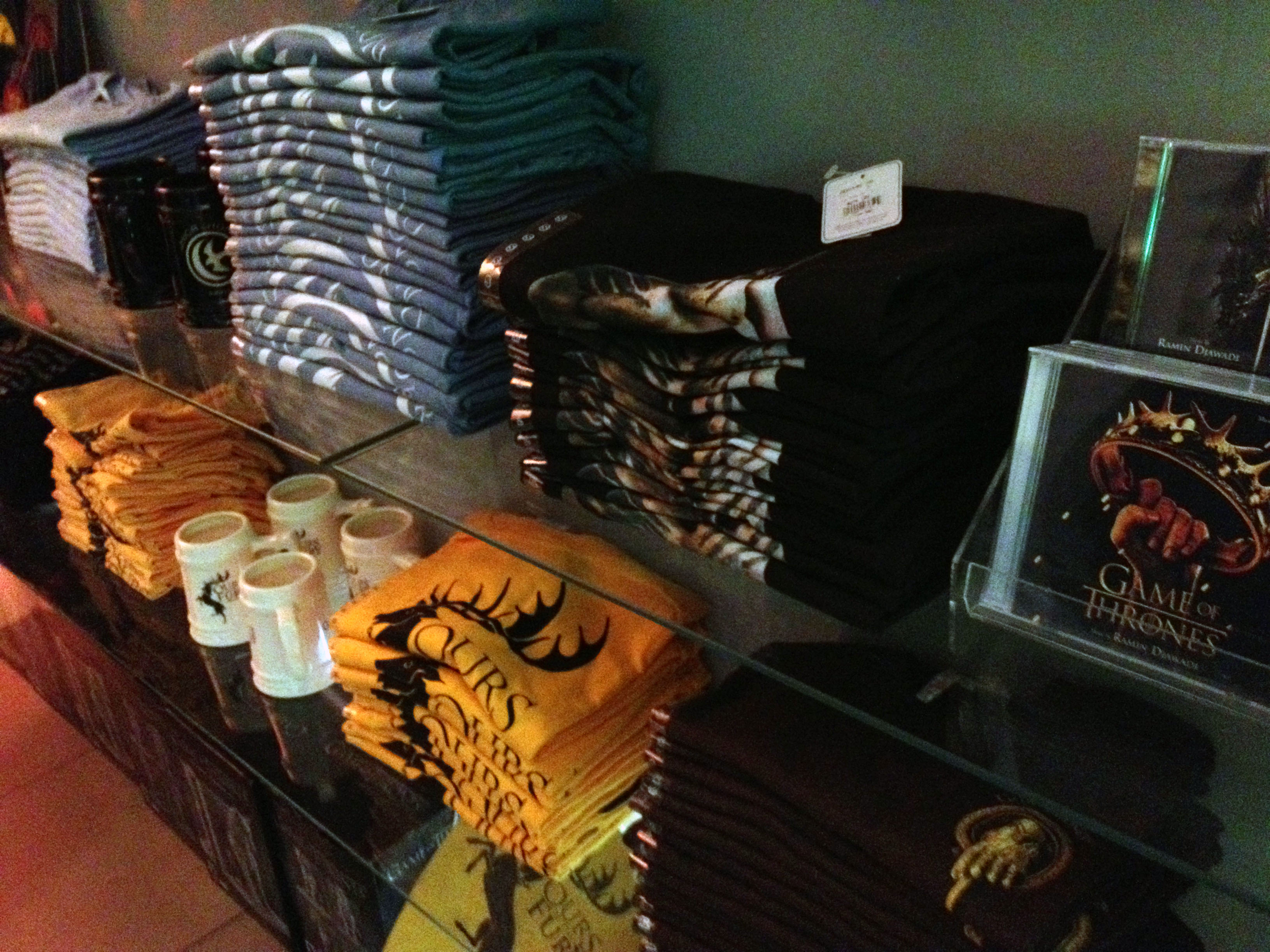
Game of Thrones merchandise in HBO's New York City store.

In 2006, George R. R. Martin had signed a deal with Jalic, Inc. of East Lansing, Michigan, granting them a license to manufacture and sell full-sized high-quality replicas of the arms and armor from A Song of Ice and Fire, under the name Valyrian Steel. Since then, the company also obtained exclusive license to produce HBO's Game of Thrones and House of the Dragon version of weapons, which differ in appearance from those described in the novels.

HBO has also partnered with a variety of product lines and companies for licensed merchandise and cross-promotion, including collectibles and games (Funko, Mattel, Pop Mart, McFarlane Toys, Diamond Select Toys, Royal Mint, theory11, Monopoly, Risk, Clue, Fortnite), foods and beverages (KFC, Shake Shack, Oreo, Bud Light, Mountain Dew, Diageo whisky line, Brewery Ommegang, Bira 91), fashion and lifestyle brands (Adidas, Urban Decay, John Varvatos, Ulysse Nardin, Tervis Tumbler, Alex and Ani, Havaianas, Pandora, Fabergé, Merrell, Secretlab), electronics (realme, XBOX, Fender, Razer, Bose), entertainment companies (AT&T, Sky UK, Foxtel, Telia Play, Google, Hulu, Duolingo, OkCupid, Snapchat, Xfinity, Roku), organizations (American Red Cross, Major League Baseball, Minnesota Timberwolves), and corporations (Bellagio, Target, Hallmark, Primark, Zillow).
