= Game of Thrones: Season 4 (soundtrack) =

Soundtrack album by Ramin Djawadi
- Released: June 10, 2014
- Genre: Soundtrack
- Length: 60:38
- Label: WaterTower Music
- Producer: Ramin Djawadi

Ramin Djawadi soundtrack chronology
Person of Interest: Season 2 (2014)	Game of Thrones: Season 4 (2014)	Game of Thrones: Season 5 (2015)

The soundtrack album of the fourth season of HBO series Game of Thrones, titled Game of Thrones: Season 4 was released digitally on June 10, 2014, and on CD on July 1, 2014. Season 4 of Game of Thrones saw the Icelandic band Sigur Rós perform their rendition of "The Rains of Castamere" in a cameo appearance at King Joffrey's wedding in the second episode, "The Lion and the Rose".

== Reception ==
The soundtrack received mostly positive reviews from critics. The soundtrack was awarded a score of 4/5 by Heather Phares of AllMusic.

== Track listing ==
No.	Title	Key scenes/Notes	Length
1.	"Main Titles"	Used in the opening sequence.	1:43
2.	"The Rains of Castamere" (performed by Sigur Rós)	"The Lion and the Rose": Played at Joffrey's wedding and during the end credits.	2:42
3.	"Breaker of Chains"	"The Children": Daenerys locks Rhaegal and Viserion beneath the Great Pyramid of Meereen. Contains the Targaryen Theme ("Fire and Blood") and hints of the Main Theme.	4:05
4.	"Watchers on the Wall"	"The Watchers on the Wall": Jon goes beyond the Wall to find Mance Rayder. The cue is an adventurous variation of the Night's Watch theme. The track also contains hints of Jon and Ygritte's theme ("You Know Nothing").	2:11
5.	"I'm Sorry for Today"	Grey Worm and Missandei's theme. "The Mountain and the Viper": Heard when Grey Worm apologises to Missandei for watching her during the river bathing. "The Wars to Come": When Missandei asks Grey Worm why an Unsullied would go in a brothel. "Kill the Boy": Grey Worm tells Missandei that he's afraid to never see her again, just before their first kiss. "Stormborn": Heard just before Missandei and Grey Worm's sexual relationship begins, when they talk and undress.	2:09
6.	"Thenns"	"Breaker of Chains": Variations of the theme (with an extra melodic line in the low strings) are heard when the Thenns attack a peaceful village, which Olly is from. "The Mountain and the Viper": The same variations are heard when Mole's Town is attacked. "The Watchers on the Wall": Heard fully during the attack and battle at Castle Black.	1:43
7.	"Mereen"	"Two Swords": The introduction is heard during Daario's and Grey Worm's wager. "Breaker of Chains": Daenerys and her troops arrive at Meereen, before the duel of Daario and the champion of Meereen outside the city walls. "Oathkeeper": The last seconds are heard when Daenerys stands victorious on the Pyramid of Meereen after taking the city. The title is misspelled on official releases as the name of the city is Meereen. Contains the melody of the Daenerys Targaryen's theme ("Love in the Eyes").	2:53
8.	"First of His Name"	"The Lion and the Rose": The first part is heard when Joffrey and Margaery Tyrell are married. The second dissonant part is heard when Joffrey suffocates to death and Cersei accuses Tyrion of murdering her son. Contains the House Baratheon theme ("The King's Arrival").	3:52
9.	"The Biggest Fire the North Has Ever Seen"	"The Watchers on the Wall": Jon and the rangers watch from atop the wall the huge fire beneath them, just before the commence of the battle of Castle Black. Contains the melody of "Thenns".	1:56
10.	"Three Eyed Raven"	"The Children": Bran, Summer, Hodor, Jojen and Meera find the Weirwood tree. After, heard when Bran, Summer, Hodor and Meera meet the Three Eyed Raven. "Home": When Bran goes talking with Meera out of the cave with Hodor's help.	3:58
11.	"Two Swords"	"Two Swords": played in cold open scene (prior to the main title sequence) showing Tywin reforging the Stark family greatsword Ice into two smaller swords and burning Ned's wolfskin scabbard-covering in the forge fire. Contains House Stark's theme ("Goodbye Brother") and House Lannister's theme ("A Lannister Always Pays His Debts").	1:49
12.	"Oathkeeper"	Brienne of Tarth's theme. "The Children": The Hound and Brienne duel. "Mother's Mercy": A variation plays when Brienne sentences Stannis to death and prepares to execute him. Contains a melody associated with Catelyn Stark and later with Brienne of Tarth ("The Old Gods and the New").	4:31
13.	"You Are No Son of Mine"	"The Children": Tyrion confronts Tywin with the crossbow while making his escape. Afterwards, Tyrion and Varys make it to the departing ship and Arya rides to the port to board the ship to Braavos. Contains the melody of the House Lannister theme ("A Lannister Always Pays His Debts") and the main title theme, the latter in a cello version and a choral version.	4:29
14.	"The North Remembers"	"Dark Wings, Dark Words": First heard when Catelyn reveals Talisa that she once made a prayer wheel twice, one for Bran and other for Jon Snow when he was a child. "Two Swords": Sansa laments Catelyn and Robb's murder. The cue is a sorrowful rendition of the House Stark theme.	2:33
15.	"Let's Kill Some Crows"	"The Watchers on the Wall": During the battle at Castle Black. It is also heard during the end credits. Contains the melody of "Thenns" and the main title theme.	3:36
16.	"Craster's Keep"	"First of His Name": Jon burns down Craster's keep.	2:06
17.	"The Real North"	"The Children": Jon goes North of the Wall to make a funeral pyre for Ygritte. Contains the melody from Jon and Ygritte's theme ("You Know Nothing").	2:03
18.	"Forgive Me"	"The Mountain and the Viper": Daenerys dismisses Ser Jorah and sends him into exile. Contains part of Daenerys Targaryen's theme ("Love in the Eyes").	2:31
19.	"He Is Lost"	"The Children": Heard when Bran, Hodor, Summer, Meera and Jojen get attacked on the frozen lake and Jojen is killed. Contains hints of the White Walkers' theme ("White Walkers").	3:37
20.	"I Only See What Matters"	"The Children": Cersei reconciles with Jaime and they make love. "Eastwatch": Jaime understands that Cersei is pregnant and they kiss.	1:25
21.	"Take Charge of Your Life"	"The Mountain and the Viper": Sansa is interrogated by the Lords of the Vale and clears Petyr from all charges. The first part of the cue is also heard when Petyr tells Robin to discover the world outside the Eyrie. Contains elements of the Stark theme ("Goodbye Brother") and elements of Petyr Baelish's theme ("Chaos Is a Ladder").	2:05
22.	"The Children"	"The Children": Heard when Arya leaves Westeros and sails to Braavos. The track is predominantly a modified choral version of the main title theme, though it also contains elements of the House Stark theme ("Goodbye Brother"), and Arya's theme ("Valar Morghulis"). A shorter version is used on the main menu of season 4's DVD/Blu-ray release.	2:41
Total length:			60:38

== Credits and personnel ==
Personnel adapted from the album liner notes.

- David Benioff – liner notes
- Ramin Djawadi – composer, primary artist, producer
- Sigur Rós – primary artist
- George R.R. Martin – lyricist
- D.B. Weiss – liner notes

== Charts ==
Chart (2014)	Peak position
Belgian Albums (Ultratop Wallonia)	150

== Awards and nominations ==
Year	Award	Category	Nominee(s)	Result	Ref.
2014	66th Primetime Creative Arts Emmy Awards	Outstanding Music Composition for a Series (Original Dramatic Score)	Episode: "The Mountain and the Viper"	Nominated	
2014	Hollywood Music in Media Awards	Best Original Score – TV Show/Digital Streaming Series		Nominated	
