= Jamie East =

English television presenter, broadcaster, journalist and singer-songwriter

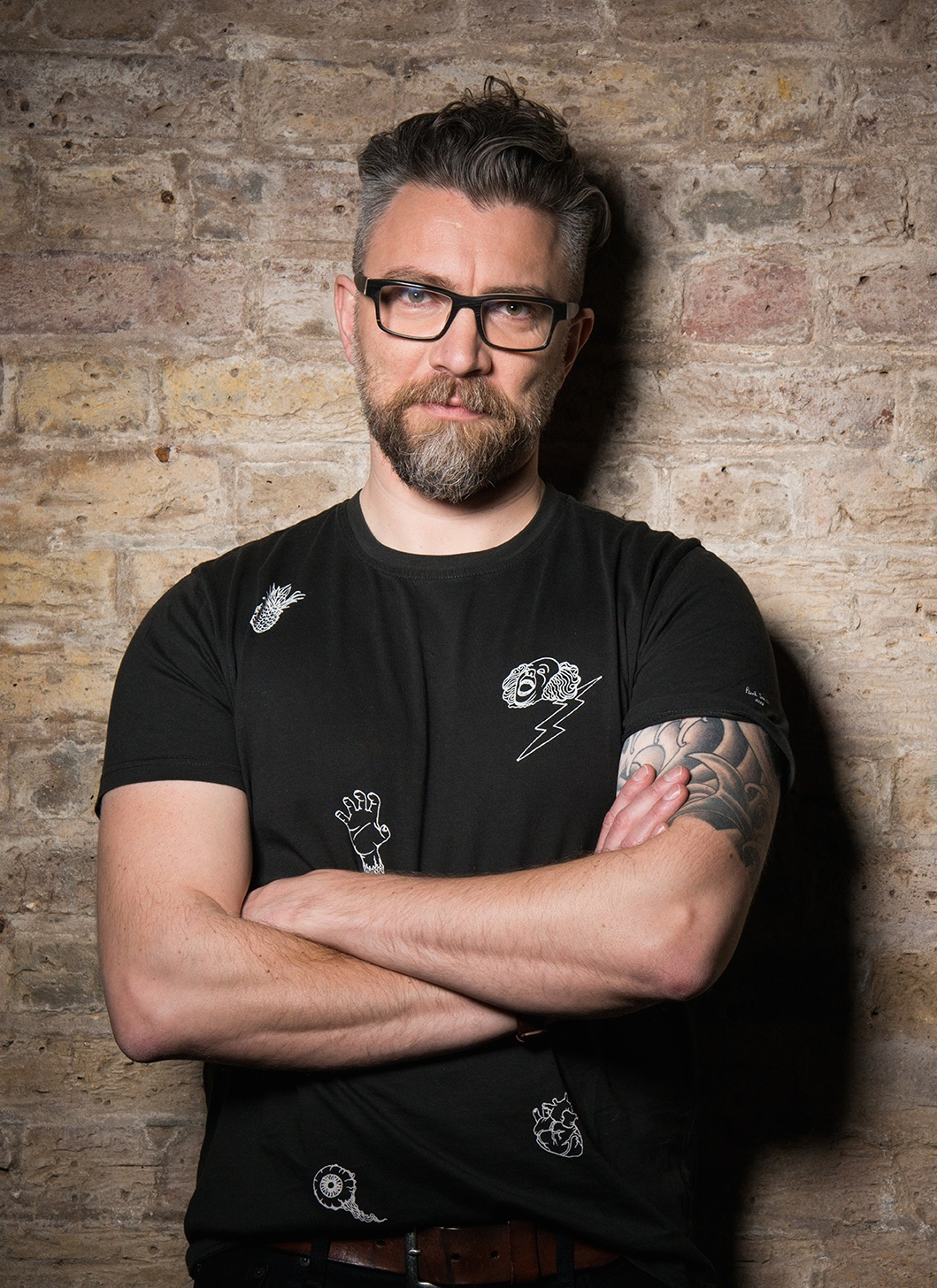
- East in 2016
- Born: James Alexander East; 27 March 1974 (age 52); Birmingham, West Midlands, England
- Occupations: Television presenter, broadcaster, journalist
- Years active: 1993–present
- Known for: Big Brother's Bit on the Side, Thronecast, Most Haunted Live
- Children: 4

Jamie Alexander East (born 27 March 1974) is an English television presenter, broadcaster, journalist and singer-songwriter.

== Career ==
He was the lead singer of the band The Beekeepers, who signed to Beggars Banquet in the late 1990s. They reformed in 2011 for a series of gigs, and continue to both gig and write to this day.

He was the creator of entertainment website Holy Moly and ran it until 2012, when he sold it to UK Television Producers Endemol.

=== Television ===
He began his TV career presenting Big Brother spin-off show Big Brother's Bit on the Side alongside Emma Willis and Alice Levine from the show's revival on Channel 5 in 2011 until January 2013.

In 2014 he became the presenter of Thronecast, the Game of Thrones fan show on Sky Atlantic, alongside comedian Rachel Parris. In 2015, Thronecast went live every Monday night, and Jamie was joined by Sue Perkins.

On Halloween 2015, Jamie co-presented Most Haunted Live! with Rylan Clark-Neal on Really. It became the highest rated show the channel had ever seen, out performing Channel 4 & 5 in its time slot.

In October 2016, East co-presented Celebrity Haunted Hotel Live on the W TV channel, alongside Christine Lampard and Matt Richardson.

=== Radio and podcasting ===
In February 2016 it was announced he would be joining the new Virgin Radio UK team and would be presenting every weekday 10-1 alongside Edith Bowman, Kate Lawler, Matt Richardson and Tim Cocker. He left the mid-morning show in early January 2018. Since 2018, East presented various documentary series for the station including 'Virgin Radio Classic Album' and covered drivetime for Matt Richardson. He left Virgin Radio at the end of 2018.

Since late 2017, East has covered shows on national speech station talkRadio. In January 2018, East began presenting the afternoon show from 1–4pm on an interim period alongside a range of co-hosts including Melanie Sykes and Saira Khan. His show was named East World. In September 2018, East moved to Sunday afternoons and continued to regularly cover other shows.

In April 2020, East founded news podcast Smart 7, combining his work on this with his continued duties at talkRADIO.

In late September 2020, East stepped down from talkRADIO, subsequently indicating that his decision was in part sparked by a segment broadcast earlier in the month, which subsequently went viral online, in which Mark Dolan cut up a face covering, whilst calling for the UK to 'get back to normal' in the COVID-19 pandemic. East said, "It’s clear that Talkradio has a clearly defined idea of where it’s heading, sadly not many of those ideals were a great fit." Following his exit from talkRADIO, East moved to devoting more time to Smart 7.

East hosts a podcast called "The Sound of Succession" FKA "Dragoncast" with Chris Mandle from Carlisle. and in 2026 launched Tales from the Celebrity Trenches, a podcast covering celebrity, entertainment and culture news, with Alice Brine.

Daily Mail publisher DMG Media appointed Jamie East as head of podcasts in 2023.

== Personal life ==
He lives in Surrey and is married with four children. He is the son of former Tiswas presenter Trevor East.

== Filmography ==
- Big Brother's Bit on the Side (2011–2013) – Co-presenter
- Thronecast (2014–present) – Co-presenter
- Most Haunted Live! (2015) – Guest presenter
- Celebrity Haunted Hotel Live (2016) – Co-presenter
