= The Red Woman =

- Game of Thrones episode
- Episode no.: Season 6 Episode 1
- Directed by: Jeremy Podeswa
- Written by: David Benioff; D. B. Weiss
- Cinematography by: Gregory Middleton
- Editing by: Crispin Green
- Original air date: April 24, 2016
- Running time: 50 minutes

Guest appearances
- Owen Teale as Alliser Thorne; Ben Crompton as Eddison Tollett; Alexander Siddig as Doran Martell; DeObia Oparei as Areo Hotah; Faye Marsay as the Waif; Daniel Portman as Podrick Payne; Keisha Castle-Hughes as Obara Sand; Rosabell Laurenti Sellers as Tyene Sand; Jessica Henwick as Nymeria Sand; Hannah Waddingham as Septa Unella; Toby Sebastian as Trystane Martell; Brenock O'Connor as Olly; Hafþór Júlíus Björnsson as Gregor Clegane; Charlotte Hope as Myranda; Joe Naufahu as Khal Moro; Chuku Modu as Ahko; Staz Nair as Qhono; Rubi Ali as a Khal Moro's wife; Fola Evans-Akingbola as a Khal Moro's wife; Gerald Lepkowski as Zanrush; Richard Rycroft as Maester Wolkan; Brian Fortune as Othell Yarwyck; Michael Condron as Bowen Marsh

Episode chronology
← Previous "Mother's Mercy"	Next → "Home"
- Game of Thrones season 6

"The Red Woman" is the sixth season premiere episode of HBO's fantasy television series Game of Thrones, and the 51st overall. The episode was written by series creators David Benioff and D. B. Weiss, and directed by Jeremy Podeswa.

In the episode, the lifeless body of Jon Snow is discovered by Ser Davos Seaworth and loyal members of the Night's Watch protect it; Melisandre has begun to lose her faith in the Lord of Light; Sansa Stark and Theon Greyjoy flee Winterfell; Ellaria Sand and the Sand Snakes seize control of Dorne; Jaime Lannister returns to King's Landing with the body of his dead daughter; and Daenerys Targaryen is taken prisoner by the khalasar of Khal Moro.

For filming of the episode's closing reveal, the director used a similar technique to the body double of Cersei Lannister in the previous episode. The episode title is an allusion to the epithet used to describe the Red Priestess Melisandre. This episode marks the final appearances of Alexander Siddig (Doran Martell), DeObia Oparei (Areo Hotah) and Toby Sebastian (Trystane Martell).

"The Red Woman" was positively received by critics, who found the episode to be a satisfactory launching point for the season, and praising the scenes involving Sansa and Brienne, as well as the closing reveal with Melisandre, although the Dorne storyline was criticized for feeling too abrupt and deviating greatly from the books. In the United States, the episode premiere achieved a viewership of 7.94 million in its initial broadcast, and a same-day total including the streaming services HBO Go and HBO Now of 10.7 million viewers, a record for the series.

== Plot ==
=== In the North ===
Roose Bolton warns Ramsay Bolton that they could face retribution from the Lannisters for Ramsay's marriage to Sansa Stark and must therefore retrieve her to ensure the support of the North.

Brienne of Tarth and Podrick Payne rescue Sansa and Theon Greyjoy from a squad of Bolton soldiers.

=== In King's Landing ===
Jaime Lannister arrives in King's Landing bearing Myrcella's body and promises Cersei that they will have revenge against all who have wronged them.

Obara and Nymeria Sand infiltrate Trystane Martell's ship and Obara kills him by stabbing him through the back of the head.

Margaery Tyrell remains imprisoned by the Faith. She is visited by the High Sparrow who insists she must confess, saying she's on the right path but has a long way to go.

=== In Dorne ===
Doran Martell learns from a letter that Myrcella Baratheon was poisoned by Ellaria Sand. Before he can act, Tyene Sand kills Areo Hotah and Ellaria fatally stabs Doran in the chest while his guards watch him die, having grown dissatisfied with his rule and his lack of action against the Lannisters for the deaths of Elia and Oberyn Martell.

=== In Meereen ===
Tyrion Lannister and Varys walk through the deserted streets of Meereen. Varys promises that his spies will find the leader of the Sons of the Harpy. The two discover that all of the ships in Meereen's harbor have been set ablaze, and Tyrion realizes that Daenerys' forces will be unable to sail to Westeros.

=== In the Dothraki Sea ===
Jorah Mormont and Daario Naharis search for Daenerys Targaryen and discover she has been taken captive by a Dothraki horde.

Daenerys is presented to Khal Moro, who has taken her prisoner. Daenerys explains that she was Khal Drogo's wife and asks Moro to escort her back to Meereen, but he refuses, as widows of khals must live out their lives in Vaes Dothrak, the Dothraki's sacred city.

=== In Braavos ===
Arya Stark, now blinded, is sent to beg on the streets and train her hearing senses. The Waif appears and forces Arya to duel her using a wooden staff. Arya fails, and the Waif promises that she will return the following day.

=== At the Wall ===
The loyalists take Jon Snow's body into a storeroom. Melisandre is troubled, as she had experienced a vision of Jon fighting at Winterfell. The loyalists lock themselves in from the mutineers, while Eddison sneaks out of Castle Black to get assistance from the Wildlings. Ser Alliser Thorne convenes the Night's Watch and takes responsibility for Jon's assassination. Thorne and the other mutineers surround the storeroom and threaten to attack if the loyalists do not surrender by nightfall. Melisandre goes to sleep in her bedroom. As she undresses, she is revealed to have a physical body many years older than she normally appears.

== Production ==
=== Writing ===
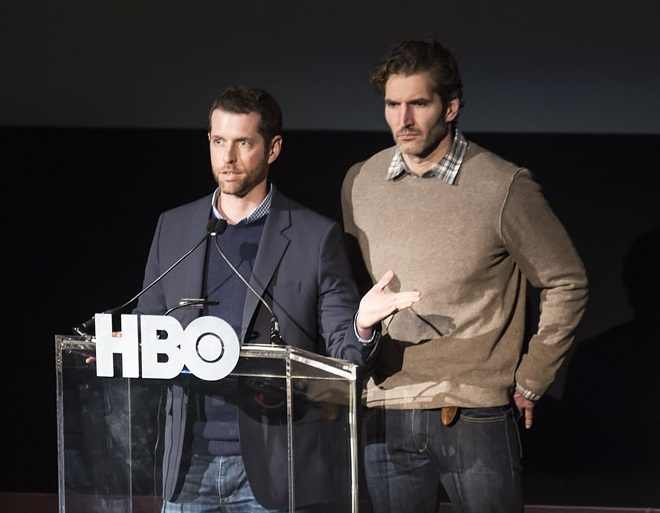
Series co-creators David Benioff and D. B. Weiss wrote the episode.

"The Red Woman" was written by the series' creators David Benioff and D. B. Weiss. Some elements in the episode are based on the sixth novel in the A Song of Ice and Fire series, The Winds of Winter, which author George R. R. Martin had hoped to have completed before the sixth season began airing. It also contains elements from the chapters "The Sacrifice" and "The Blind Girl" from A Dance with Dragons. With this episode, Jonathan Pryce (High Sparrow) is promoted to series regular. The episode has the introduction of new recurring cast member Joe Naufahu, who plays Khal Moro. It was the first episode followed by After the Thrones, HBO's after-show hosted by Andy Greenwald and Chris Ryan. The episode had a premiere at the TCL Chinese Theatre two weeks before the premier of the episode on HBO. There was a lot of speculation prior to the episode regarding whether the character Jon Snow would remain dead or return to life. Fans speculated that Melisandre would be the one to bring back Snow to life, after and before the title of the first episode was revealed to be "The Red Woman".

Liam Cunningham, who portrays Davos Seaworth, spoke about the writing of the episode following its airing, and revealed how he reacted to the scene, saying "It was initially shocking. You know what I thought was my favorite bit, and I said it to David and Dan, it was at that moment when the reveal comes and you kind of go, 'Oh my God,' it puts things into context with Melisandre. It doesn't explain or blah, blah, blah. … It's confirmed like, she's a witch, but there was such a touch of humanity. When she went to the bed and got into the bed and covered herself up… it was like a really striking moment in this weird madness of humanity."

John Bradley, who portrays Samwell Tarly, also spoke about the scene, saying "And what I like about that, and seeing her like that is you know then that her sexuality over the course of the last few seasons, we've seen her use as such a tool -- that's all very deliberate. She presents herself in this way as this beautiful woman because she knows the effect that that can have on people. She knows the effect that that has on Stannis, and that can make men do unadvisable things. So the fact that she did that and she uses that power in that way to have this influence on people. That puts her into context as somebody who really does know what she's doing."

=== Filming ===
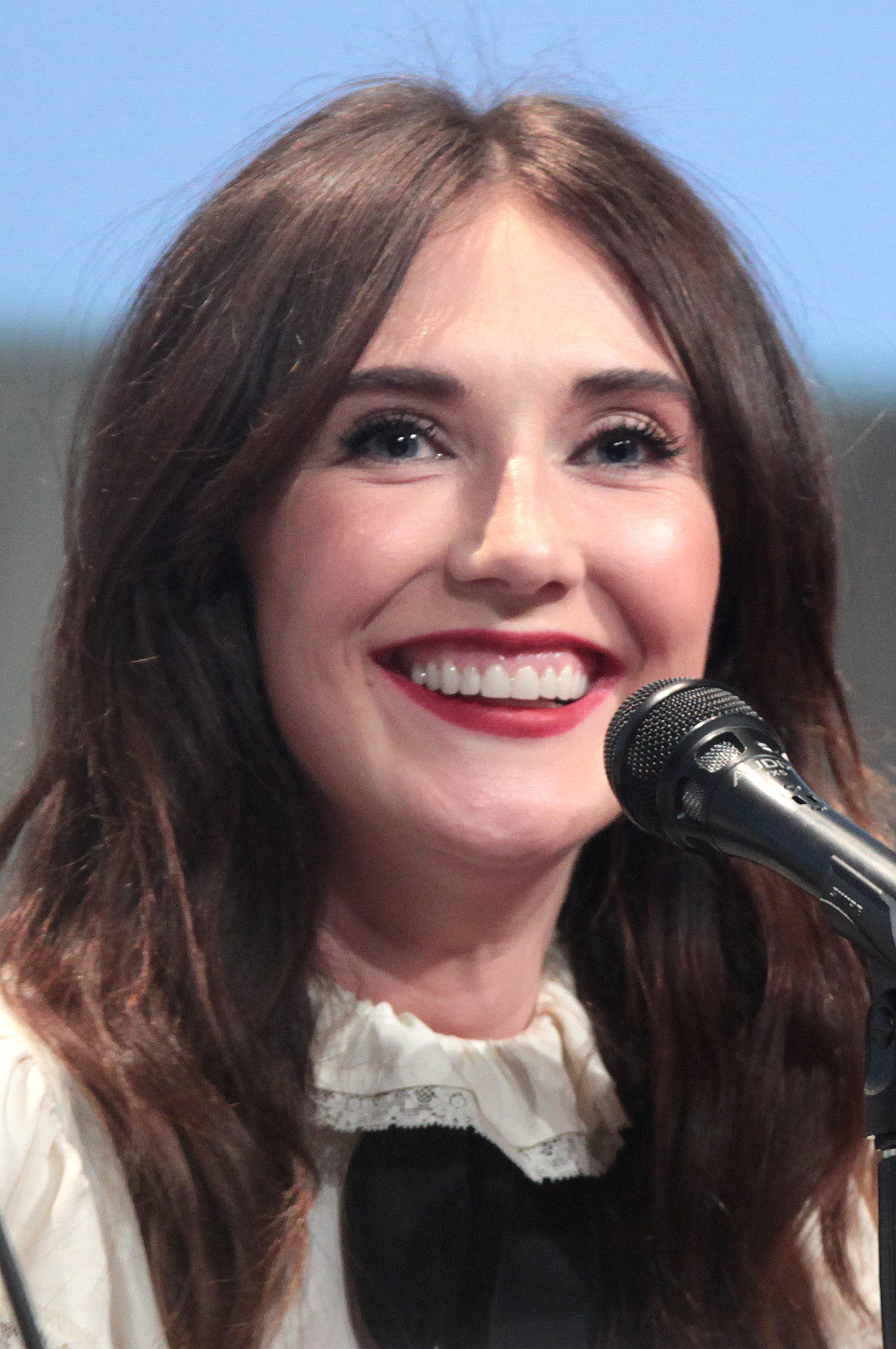
Carice van Houten portrays the titular character of the episode, the Red Woman Melisandre.

"The Red Woman" was directed by Jeremy Podeswa. Podeswa previously directed the fifth season episodes "Kill the Boy" and "Unbowed, Unbent, Unbroken", the latter of which received a Primetime Emmy Award nomination for Outstanding Directing for a Drama Series. The budget for the sixth season increased compared to the previous seasons as each episode had an average cost of over $10 million, totaling approximately $100 million for the full season, setting a new high for the series.

For the closing reveal involving Melisandre, the director of the episode stated that a similar technique to the body double of Cersei Lannister in "Mother's Mercy" was used, with Carice van Houten wearing prosthetic makeup for the face that was then transposed onto the real body of an old woman. Podeswa stated, "The idea is there's an indefinite indeterminate quality that she could be ancient. We were limited by choosing to use a real person rather than a complete [computer generated] creation. Because what does a 400-year-old person look like? We don't know. So if you try to create that, then you're creating something that looks beyond our known reality. Here you feel like she's very old without putting a number on it."

== Reception ==
=== Ratings ===
"The Red Woman" was viewed by 7.94 million American households on its first viewing, which is slightly lower than number of viewers for the fifth-season premiere, 8.00 million, marking the first time in the show's history a season premiere received less ratings than the premiere and finale of the season that came before it. HBO notes that two replays later in the night and early figures from HBO Go and HBO Now push the total to 10.7 million viewers, a same-day record for the show, meaning that the episode received an increase in viewerships. The episode also acquired a 4.0 rating in the 18–49 demographic, making it the highest rated show on cable television of the night. In the United Kingdom, the episode was watched by 2.19 million viewers according to overnight ratings (2.289 million viewers over 7 days and 2.554 over 28 days), a record for the pay channel Sky Atlantic. The UK viewing figures reached an all-time high. The 2am simulcast attracted 60,000 viewers. Similarly it broke the Australian record as the most watched show on pay TV, with 721,000 viewers in the overnight figures and 1.1 million in the final tally. Over a million had downloaded the episode within 12 hours of airing, with Australia having the most illegal downloads of the episode by a single nation.

=== Critical reception ===
Reviews for "The Red Woman" were very positive. The episode was praised for its humor, Brienne's reunion with Sansa and Theon, and the revelation regarding Melisandre's true age. Rotten Tomatoes gave the episode an approval rating of 86% based on 59 reviews, with an average rating of 7.5.4/10, and the consensus reading: "A solid season opener, "The Red Woman" balanced its ongoing mysteries with a bit of humor and featured Sansa's touching reunion with Brienne of Tarth."

James Hunt of What Culture wrote in his review of the episode; "It was a good return to the Seven Kingdoms (and beyond), one that was filled with tension throughout, and set about re-establishing the pieces on the board." Ellen Gray of Philadelphia Daily News noted in her review of the episode; "First episodes are always difficult. So many people to check in on. Or kill. Or swear vengeance upon. Still, things are off to several promising starts." Mark W. Pleiss of PopMatters wrote in his review of the episode; "The most recent episode of HBO's Game of Thrones largely evaded the two major questions from the previous chapter, and instead lined up its sixth season to gravitate around the heroics and cunning of its female protagonists." Tim Surette of TV.com wrote that Melisandre is one of his favorite characters.

In isolation from the rest of the episode, many critics were baffled by the drastic changes to the Dorne storyline. For io9, Charlie Jane Anders called it "the absolute worst" part of the episode, and criticized the Dorne storyline in general for giving Doran Martell "a grand total of ten minutes' screentime" before suddenly killing him off, given that he is alive in the novels and his major subplot from the books—that he was simply feigning a desire for peace while planning to betray the Lannisters—was not introduced at all before his departure. Alan Sepinwall from HitFix also disliked the Dorne scenes and summarized, "I'll settle for not needing to audibly groan every time the story returns to Dorne, frankly." For Vulture, Nate Jones wrote an op-ed piece specifically criticizing the Dorne storyline in seasons five and six, culminating in the changes in the season six premiere, which it felt to be bizarre and illogical—purely relying on shock value when the characters' actions don't make sense upon closer analysis. Jones was also critical of how it was altering the female characters in Dorne, saying that they were changed from the novels to be "the kind of violent, scantily clad women that emerge when creators want to pay lip service to feminism, but don't have the time or inclination to create actual three-dimensional female characters."
