= J. J. Murphy (actor) =

Irish film and TV actor

- Born: James Joseph Murphy; 7 May 1928; Belfast, Northern Ireland
- Died: 8 August 2014 (aged 86); Belfast, Northern Ireland
- Occupation: Actor
- Years active: 1948–2014
- Spouse: Mary (1955–2014; his death)
- Children: 2

James Joseph "J. J." Murphy (7 May 1928 – 8 August 2014) was a Northern Irish film and television actor. He was known for his roles in the films Cal (1984), Angela's Ashes (1999), Mickybo and Me (2004) and Dracula Untold (2014), as well as the Game of Thrones episode "The House of Black and White" (2015), but also known for his roles in theatre. He was also featured in The Sparticle Mystery with him being known as "The Keeper" in the final series.

== Early life ==
Murphy trained with the Ulster Group Theatre School in 1948. Murphy also worked at the Lyric Theatre in Belfast for several years, alongside actors Liam Neeson and Ciarán Hinds.

== Death ==
On 8 August 2014, Murphy died aged 86 in Belfast from natural causes, four days after filming an episode of season 5 of the HBO television series Game of Thrones, in which he portrayed Denys Mallister, a senior member of the Night's Watch and commander of the Shadow Tower, who was slated to be a recurring character in the series. Murphy was survived by his wife Mary, their two children Joseph and Jane, and his granddaughter Sarah-Jane.

Game of Thrones creators D.B. Weiss and David Benioff later announced, "We will not be recasting J.J. Murphy. He was a lovely man, and the best Denys Mallister we could have hoped for. And now his watch is ended." The episode that Murphy appeared in, "The House of Black and White", was broadcast on 19 April 2015. Murphy's funeral took place in St Brigid's Church in Belfast on 14 August 2014, five days after his death.
