= Helen Sloan =

Irish photographer

- Born: Ireland
- Occupation: Photography
- Notable work: On-set photographer for Game of Thrones

Helen Sloan is an Irish photographer who initially started her professional work taking wistful pictures of acrobatic artists in a circus company. She has moved into a long term assignment as a photographer filming for the American HBO's TV series titled Game of Thrones. She is an Irish member of the Society of Motion Picture Still Photographers (SMPSP) and is the first Irish person to work from Los Angeles. She held an exhibition of her "on-set photography" in May 2016 under the auspices of AP and Nikon School in London, of her still photographs taken for the HBO's series.

== Biography ==
Helen Sloan was born in Ireland in a family environment of artistic parents - father interested in art work and mother in music and both pursued teaching profession. She started using the first camera (Nikon F3), at the age of 11 lent to her by her father when photography became her passion. Even as a child her desire was to become an illustrator as pencils and crayons were the only drawing tools available with her at that time. She lived in Iceland for many years and completed her college education. She started her art education in Applied Art and Art History at Goldsmiths, University of London but did not pursue till graduation. Then she studied at the Belfast College of Art and Design and graduated with a degree in Fine and Applied Art. While still studying, when she was 18, she took up an assignment to photograph the circus acrobats for the Belfast Community Circus School for using them for publicity, and here she became skillful in still photography; these were melancholic pictures. But even before this assignment she had worked for a newspaper in Ballymena in County Antrim for a short period learning the skills of developing films, cleaning, and printing. From the circus company she moved to work for shooting stills for short films which eventually led to her work for feature films and television.

The portrait pictures she had taken of circus artists attracted a movie producer who offered her a job on the sets of a horror movie. Then she worked for 10 years on many assignments in movies and TV sets before joining the Game of Thrones TV series as Principal Stills Photographer.

At the Game of Thrones TV series her assignments covered landscape, portraiture, studio-lit posters, and behind-the-scenes documentary. She started working from the pilot episode, and the photos taken by her were part of publicity articles or reviews of episodes related to promotional portraits of artists or the scenes of the film series.
