= Mother's Mercy =

- Game of Thrones episode
- Episode no.: Season 5 Episode 10
- Directed by: David Nutter
- Written by: David Benioff; D. B. Weiss
- Cinematography by: Robert McLachlan
- Editing by: Tim Porter
- Original air date: June 14, 2015
- Running time: 60 minutes

Guest appearances
- Jonathan Pryce as the High Sparrow; Owen Teale as Alliser Thorne; Tara Fitzgerald as Selyse Baratheon; Ian Beattie as Meryn Trant; Anton Lesser as Qyburn; Julian Glover as Grand Maester Pycelle; Alexander Siddig as Doran Martell; Jacob Anderson as Grey Worm; Daniel Portman as Podrick Payne; Faye Marsay as the Waif; DeObia Oparei as Areo Hotah; Keisha Castle-Hughes as Obara Sand; Rosabell Laurenti Sellers as Tyene Sand; Jessica Henwick as Nymeria Sand; Brenock O'Connor as Olly; Charlotte Hope as Myranda; Ian Gelder as Kevan Lannister; Nell Tiger Free as Myrcella Baratheon; Toby Sebastian as Trystane Martell; Hannah Waddingham as Septa Unella; Hafþór Júlíus Björnsson as Gregor Clegane; Brian Fortune as Othell Yarwyck; Michael Condron as Bowen Marsh

Episode chronology
← Previous "The Dance of Dragons"	Next → "The Red Woman"
- Game of Thrones season 5

"Mother's Mercy" is the tenth and final episode of the fifth season of HBO's medieval fantasy television series Game of Thrones, and the 50th overall. The fifth season finale, the episode was written by series co-creators David Benioff and D. B. Weiss and directed by David Nutter. It first aired on June 14, 2015.

The episode's plot primarily follows Stannis Baratheon's attack on Winterfell, which ends in Stannis's defeat and eventual death, and Cersei Lannister's walk of atonement in King's Landing, which the High Sparrow demands she complete before her trial. Minor plotlines include Jaime Lannister and Myrcella leaving Dorne, Daenerys Targaryen being captured by the Dothraki, and Jon Snow being betrayed and murdered at the Wall. The episode achieved a viewership of 8.11 million during its initial airing in the United States, setting a new viewership record for the show.

"Mother's Mercy" garnered critical acclaim, with critics lauding Lena Headey's performance, David Nutter's direction, and Benioff and Weiss's teleplay. Particular praise was directed to Cersei Lannister's walk of atonement, which involved a body double and the use of CGI, as well as the ambiguous fate of Jon Snow, which was highly discussed by critics and viewers. At the 67th Primetime Emmy Awards, the episode won the awards for Outstanding Writing in a Drama Series and Outstanding Directing in a Drama Series.

This episode marks the final appearance for Stephen Dillane (Stannis Baratheon), Tara Fitzgerald (Selyse Baratheon), and Ian Beattie (Ser Meryn Trant).

== Plot ==
=== In Braavos ===
Arya kills Trant for the murder of Syrio Forel, using a face stolen from the House of Black and White to pose as a child prostitute. Jaqen berates Arya for taking a life not meant for her to take, and declares that another life must be taken in order to appease the Many-Faced God before apparently committing suicide. The Waif, now wearing Jaqen's face, points out to Arya that "Jaqen" never existed and warns Arya that putting on a new face if one is not "No One" is like poison. As punishment, Arya is struck blind.

=== In the North ===
In the wake of his sacrifice of his daughter, Shireen, Stannis is informed that half of his forces have deserted and his wife has hanged herself in grief. Stannis nonetheless orders his remaining troops to march on Winterfell. After a quick yet fierce battle, the Boltons emerge as the victors. Stannis survives the destruction of his army, but is severely wounded. Brienne arrives and executes Stannis for the murder of Renly Baratheon. Sansa attempts to escape during the chaos but is confronted by Myranda, who threatens to shoot Sansa with an arrow. Sansa refuses to be intimidated and Theon throws Myranda from the catwalk to her death just as the Bolton army returns to Winterfell. Theon and Sansa jump from the castle walls into the deep snow below in an attempt to escape.

=== In Dorne ===
Bidding farewell to Jaime and Myrcella, Ellaria kisses Myrcella on the lips. Myrcella reveals that she knows Jaime is her real father and that she is glad that he is her father. Myrcella suddenly collapses and dies in Jaime's arms, and it is revealed that Ellaria had secretly poisoned her with poisoned lipstick.

=== In Meereen ===
Daario and Jorah leave Meereen to search for Daenerys. Tyrion is left to govern Meereen in Daenerys' absence, assisted by Missandei and Grey Worm. Varys arrives in Meereen and offers use of his spy network to aid Tyrion.

=== In the Dothraki Sea ===
Drogon brings Daenerys back to his lair. Daenerys wanders off on her own, spotting a Dothraki horde advancing in the distance. Daenerys drops a ring to the ground before being surrounded.

=== In King's Landing ===
Cersei confesses to committing adultery with Lancel to the High Sparrow, but denies mothering children to her brother Jaime. The High Sparrow allows Cersei to return to the Red Keep to await a formal trial, but she is forced to walk naked from the Great Sept of Baelor to the Red Keep while being jeered at and pelted with garbage by the angry crowd. Upon returning to the Red Keep, she is comforted by Qyburn and the mutated, undead iteration of Gregor Clegane.

=== At the Wall ===
Jon sends Samwell with Gilly and her baby to Oldtown to become a maester. Olly and Thorne take Jon outside under the pretense of seeing a wildling who had recently seen his uncle Benjen Stark. Led outside, he realizes that he has been betrayed. Thorne, Marsh, Yarwyck, Olly, and the others take turns stabbing Jon, each uttering "For the Watch", before leaving him to die alone in the snow.

== Production ==
=== Writing ===
"Mother's Mercy" was written by the series' creators David Benioff and D. B. Weiss. It primarily covers elements from George Martin's novels A Feast for Crows, chapters "Samwell I" and "Cat of the Canals" and A Dance with Dragons, chapters "Jon II", "Theon I", "Daenerys X", "Cersei I", "Cersei II" and "Jon XIII". It also contains material from Martin's upcoming sixth novel in the series, The Winds of Winter, chapter "Mercy".

=== Filming ===
"Mother's Mercy" was directed by David Nutter, He also directed the previous episode, "The Dance of Dragons". It was photographed by Robert McLachlan and was edited by Tim Porter, one of the show's main editors, under the supervision of Nutter.

=== Cersei's walk of atonement ===
For Cersei Lannister's nude "walk of atonement" through King's Landing, HBO employed actress Rebecca Van Cleave as a body double for Lena Headey. While filming the scene on the Jesuit stairs in Dubrovnik, Croatia in October 2014, Van Cleave performed fully nude while Headey wore a simple beige shift. Both performances were then merged by the show's editing team, combining close-ups of Headey's facial expressions and long shots of Van Cleave's nude walk through the city. In some instances CGI was used to put Headey's face on Van Cleave's body.

Headey says that the showrunners decided to cast a body double for "several reasons." Headey says she was glad to use a body double for the scene because she wanted to focus on the character's emotions. Another actor noted that Headey's "extensive tattoos" may have been another reason. Months later, Headey announced that she was pregnant with her second child, though it is unclear if she was pregnant when this scene had to be filmed. Sarah Buchanan of Express notes the strangeness of casting a much younger actress to play the middle-aged Cersei when the key outcome of the walk of atonement in A Dance with Dragons is that when the people see that Cersei's body is not beautiful, she loses a large part of her mystique. The 27-year-old Van Cleave did not show any of the specific signs of aging or past pregnancy for which the Cersei of the books was mocked by the crowd.

When casting for the role, HBO received applications from more than a thousand actresses to act as Headey's body double for the scene. A selection of seven finalists, including Van Cleave, was then flown to Belfast, Northern Ireland to audition before the show's producers. Headey also opted out of the casting process, but director David Nutter said finding the right double was one of the most important parts of making the finale. "We needed somebody who could do The Walk of Shame physically, somebody who could match Lena's integrity, intensity, and sensibility. We found a tremendous actress in Rebecca; she was a godsend. The courage of this girl, who's never done anything like this in her life, who understood what was important about this...once I had her I felt like I could accomplish anything."

Van Cleave herself described the scene as "one of the scariest, most wonderful, most gratifying experiences I could have imagined ... I never in a million years would have thought I would be in Dubrovnik surrounded by hundreds of extras and crew members throwing food at me, but it was amazing" and "I hope the next thing I do will have my head in it." She also praised Headey's willingness to help her, describing the two of them as a "tag-team"; Headey would walk behind Van Cleave during the shoot, coaching her on the character's responses.

When the showrunners first announced the plans of shooting a nude scene in Dubrovnik, the city's Catholic Church of St. Nicholas strongly opposed the idea, due to it being immoral to walk their sacred grounds in the nude. Eventually, both parties came to the agreement that the shooting could commence, provided no nude scenes would be filmed in a place of worship. During the three-day shoot, Headey walked Van Cleave through each shot, giving insight into all the emotions Cersei was feeling. The six-minute scene was filmed using 500 extras.

=== Fate of Jon Snow ===
D.B. Weiss discussed the decision to kill Jon Snow by saying that he felt the visual medium did not give him the freedom to leave Jon's fate open: "In a book, you can present that kind of ambiguity. In a show, everybody sees it for what it is. It's that rule: 'If we don't see the body then they’re not really dead.' Like when we cut Ned's head off, we didn't want a gory Monty Python geyser of blood, but we needed to see the blade enter his neck and cut out on the frame where the blade was mid-neck. [...] we needed Ned's death to be totally unambiguous." Actor Kit Harington said of the scene, "I loved it. I loved how they brought Olly in to be the person who kills me. I love how the storyline with Thorne was wrapped up."

Although Weiss meant the scene to be unambiguous, the episode left many viewers uncertain as to whether Jon Snow had been killed or merely injured (his fate in the novels is left unconfirmed as of A Dance with Dragons, with much debate about Martin's future intentions). Some of the confusion may be because, as reviewers have noted, Jon was killed in what can be seen as the middle of his story arc and his death does not have an obvious narrative purpose. For example, Nate Jones of Vulture notes, "[I]t's easy to see what [other characters'] deaths meant for the series' sprawling narrative: Ned's execution sent the Stark kids adrift in a universe where there was nobody looking out for them, while Robb's murder was the final death knell for the hopes that the saga would ever have a traditional 'happy' ending. What would be accomplished, narratively, by getting rid of Jon permanently right now?" Both before and after these announcements, viewers have speculated that Jon Snow might have survived his stabbing and there are many fan theories on how he might have accomplished this, including spiritually possessing his direwolf's body or being brought back to life by Melisandre. When jokingly asked during a panel if Kit Harington would ever get to play a warg (human who has possessed the body of an animal), Weiss replied with, "Two words for you: Season 6." In July 2015, photos of Kit Harington arriving in Belfast—where the series is primarily filmed and where other actors are arriving for the Season 6 script read-throughs—surfaced, fueling speculation of his survival. However, Joanna Robinson of Vanity Fair pointed out that Charles Dance was seen at Belfast the previous year, and his character Tywin Lannister only appeared in the first episode of the subsequent season and only as a corpse, although Dance himself confirmed the nature of his role shortly after the announcement. Another photo that showed Harington on set in Belfast in a costume that varied from the Night's Watch outfit was published on September 25, 2015.

=== Fates of other characters ===
Various interviews with the producers, director and writers have indicated that it is a "safe bet" that Sansa Stark and Theon Greyjoy survive their fall, while Stannis and Myrcella were definitively killed after being beheaded and poisoned, respectively.

== Reception ==
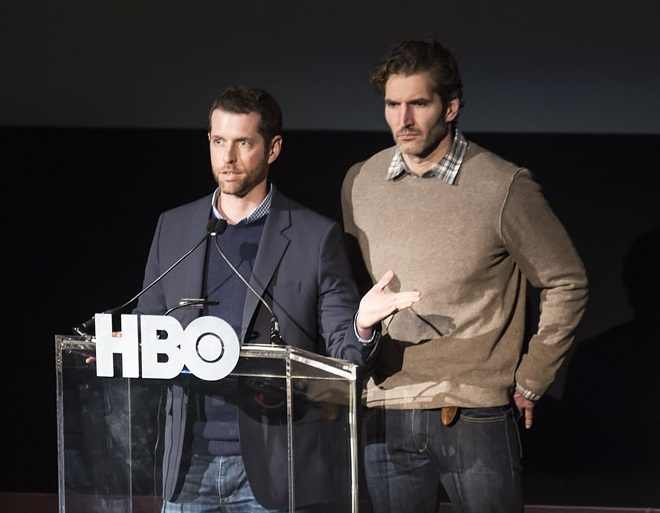
D. B. Weiss and David Benioff received an Emmy for Outstanding Writing for a Drama Series for this episode.

=== Ratings ===
"Mother's Mercy" was seen by an estimated 8.1 million viewers on its first airing. This is higher than any previous episode, exceeding the 8 million for "The Wars to Come". With Live+7 DVR viewing factored in, the episode had an overall rating of 10.43 million viewers, and a 5.4 in the 18–49 demographic, which was a series high in both viewership and 18–49 rating. In the United Kingdom, the episode was viewed by 2.437 million viewers, making it the highest-rated broadcast that week. It also received 0.121 million timeshift viewers.

=== Critical reception ===
"Mother's Mercy" received critical acclaim. Review aggregation website Rotten Tomatoes assembled 52 reviews and gave "Mother's Mercy" a 92% score and an average rating of 9.1 out of 10. The site's consensus reads: ""Mother's Mercy" wraps up a particularly dark Game of Thrones season with a finale that delivers strong character work and a handful of appropriately bleak cliffhangers." In his 9.0/10 review, Matt Fowler of IGN praised Jon Snow's death and Cersei's atonement, as well as Arya's and Dorne's storylines, but felt Sansa's storyline was too hurried. Sean T. Collins of Rolling Stone was positive too, writing, "Slaughter and shame made this the show's most upsetting season-ender yet."

=== Accolades ===
Year	Award	Category	Nominee(s)	Result	Ref.
2015	Primetime Emmy Award	Outstanding Supporting Actress in a Drama Series	Lena Headey as Cersei Lannister	Nominated	
2015	Primetime Emmy Award	Outstanding Directing for a Drama Series	David Nutter	Won	
2015	Primetime Emmy Award	Outstanding Writing for a Drama Series	David Benioff and D. B. Weiss	Won	
2015	Primetime Creative Arts Emmy Awards	Outstanding Hairstyling for a Single-Camera Series	Kevin Alexander, Candice Banks, Rosalia Culora, Gary Machin, Laura Pollock, Nicola Mount	Nominated	
2015	Primetime Creative Arts Emmy Awards	Outstanding Make-up for a Single-Camera Series (Non-Prosthetic)	Jane Walker and Nicola Matthews	Won	
2015	Gold Derby TV Awards 2015	Best Drama Episode		Won	
2016	Directors Guild of America Award	Dramatic Series	David Nutter	Won	
2016	Visual Effects Society Awards	Outstanding Animated Performance in an Episode, Commercial, or Real-Time Project	Florian Friedmann, Jonathan Symmonds, Sven Skoczylas, Sebastian Lauer' for "Mother's Mercy" - Wounded Drogon	Nominated	
2016	Visual Effects Society Awards	Outstanding Compositing in a Photoreal Episode	Travis Nobles, Mark Spindler, Max Riess, Nadja Ding for "Drogon Lair"	Nominated	
2016	Writers Guild of America Awards	Episodic Drama	David Benioff and D.B. Weiss	Nominated	
