= High Sparrow (Game of Thrones episode) =

- Game of Thrones episode
- Episode no.: Season 5 Episode 3
- Directed by: Mark Mylod
- Written by: David Benioff; D. B. Weiss
- Cinematography by: Anette Haellmigk
- Editing by: Tim Porter
- Original air date: April 26, 2015
- Running time: 59 minutes

Guest appearances
- Jonathan Pryce as High Sparrow; Julian Glover as Grand Maester Pycelle; Anton Lesser as Qyburn; Owen Teale as Ser Alliser Thorne; Roger Ashton-Griffiths as Mace Tyrell; Ben Crompton as Edd Tollett; Faye Marsay as The Waif; Daniel Portman as Podrick Payne; Dominic Carter as Janos Slynt; Ian Beattie as Ser Meryn Trant; Eugene Simon as Lancel Lannister; Brenock O'Connor as Olly; Will Tudor as Olyvar; Finn Jones as Loras Tyrell; Charlotte Hope as Myranda; Rila Fukushima as Red Priestess; Elizabeth Webster as Walda Bolton; Paul Bentley as High Septon; Brian Fortune as Othell Yarwyck; Michael Condron as Bowen Marsh

Episode chronology
← Previous "The House of Black and White"	Next → "Sons of the Harpy"
- Game of Thrones season 5

"High Sparrow" is the third episode of the fifth season of HBO's medieval fantasy television series Game of Thrones. The 43rd episode of the series overall, "High Sparrow" was written by series co-creators David Benioff and D. B. Weiss, and directed by Mark Mylod, his directorial debut for the series. It first aired on HBO on April 26, 2015.

In the episode, Cersei Lannister meets with the High Sparrow, the leader of a growing religious movement in the Faith of the Seven; Tommen Baratheon marries Margaery Tyrell; Petyr Baelish reveals to Sansa Stark that he has betrothed her to Ramsay Bolton; and Jon Snow chooses to stay at the Wall and rule as Lord Commander of the Night's Watch. Across the Narrow Sea, Arya Stark proves her loyalty to the Faceless Men, and Tyrion Lannister and Varys travel through Volantis. The episode achieved a viewership of 6.71 million in the United States, and received positive reviews from critics, who mainly praised Jon Snow's role and development, as well as the final scene.

Prior to airing, the episode, along with the other first four episodes of the season, were leaked online.

== Plot ==
=== In Braavos ===
Jaqen H'ghar helps a man drink from a pool of water. The man dies, and Arya Stark realizes that the pool of water is poison for those who seek a quick death. After Arya has an altercation with fellow acolyte "the Waif", Jaqen asks her how she came to be surrounded by things owned by Arya Stark if she is "no one". She throws her possessions into the water but does not want to discard her sword, "Needle", so she hides it.

=== In King's Landing ===
Tommen Baratheon marries Margaery Tyrell, who attempts to manipulate Tommen to persuade Cersei Lannister, his mother, to return to Casterly Rock; she declines. Cersei visits Margaery and finds her telling her handmaidens about her wedding night, then leaves defeated.

After being attacked by Lancel and the "Sparrows" in a brothel, the High Septon asks the king's Small Council to execute the Sparrow leader, the so-called "High Sparrow". Cersei instead meets the High Sparrow and tells him that he will replace the High Septon as head of the Faith of the Seven. Cersei has Qyburn send a message to Petyr Baelish.

=== In the North ===
Roose Bolton tells his son Ramsay that they cannot rely on the Lannisters now that Tywin is dead and that they will cement House Bolton's position by having Ramsay marry Sansa Stark. Sansa is horrified but consents after Baelish informs her that this presents an opportunity to seek retribution for the murders of Robb and Catelyn Stark.

At Winterfell, Baelish tells Roose that they have no reason to fear the Lannisters. Roose shows him Cersei's letter. Baelish reassures him of their alliance, but Roose requests to read his reply. Meanwhile, Reek goes out of his way to avoid being seen by Sansa.

Brienne of Tarth and Podrick "Pod" Payne have secretly followed Baelish and Sansa. Stopping at Moat Cailin, Brienne recalls Renly Baratheon's assassination and her intent to kill Stannis, whom she holds responsible. Brienne also tells Pod how she was tormented as a girl whilst revealing where her love for Renly Baratheon came from.

=== At the Wall ===
Jon refuses Stannis's offer of legitimization and assigns new positions to his brothers, making Alliser Thorne First Ranger and giving Janus Slynt charge of restoring the Greyguard. Slynt refuses and insults Jon, who executes him.

=== In Volantis ===
Tyrion and Varys arrive in Volantis, where they observe a red priestess telling slaves about the "savior," Daenerys Targaryen. Tyrion goes to a brothel and is kidnapped by Jorah Mormont, who declares that he is taking Tyrion to "the queen."

== Production ==
=== Writing ===
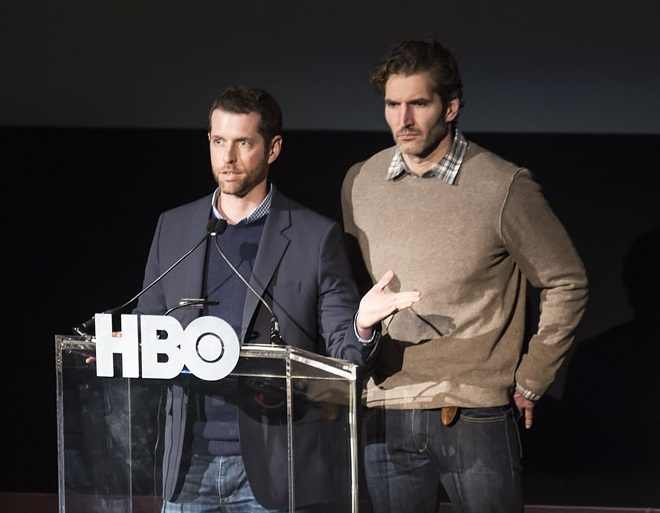
The episode was written by series co-creators David Benioff and D. B. Weiss.

This episode was written by executive producers David Benioff and D. B. Weiss and contains content from two of George R. R. Martin's novels, A Feast for Crows, Arya I, Cersei III, Arya II, Cersei V, Cersei VI, Alayne III and elements of Brienne III and Brienne IV, and A Dance with Dragons, chapters Jon II, Reek III, Tyrion VI and the Blind Girl.

Like other episodes this season, "High Sparrow" deviated from Martin's books in several places. For example, Tyrion's storyline has been sped up, and Tommen is old enough to consummate his marriage with Margaery. In what Forbes called "the biggest surprise in Sunday night's episode," Sansa Stark goes to Winterfell to marry Ramsay Bolton, a role that is played in the book by a minor character impersonating Arya. Busis describes mixed feelings regarding these changes but stated "at the very least, this is going to give Sophie Turner some real meaty material." In an interview, show writer David Benioff explains that Sophie Turner's strength as an actress was one of the reasons that they decided to give her character more dramatic scenes and Bryan Cogman added that it made more sense to give the Winterfell storyline to a proven actress who was already popular with viewers than to bring in a new character.

=== Casting ===
With this episode, Michael McElhatton (Roose Bolton) is promoted to series regular. The episode has the introduction of new recurring cast members Jonathan Pryce, who plays the High Sparrow, and Faye Marsay, who plays the Waif.

== Reception ==
=== Ratings ===
"High Sparrow" was watched by an estimated 6.71 million American viewers during its first airing, and received a 3.5 rating among adults 18–49. In the United Kingdom, the episode was viewed by 2.196 million viewers, making it the highest-rated non-terrestrial broadcast that week. It also received 0.174 million timeshift viewers.

=== Critical reception ===
The episode received positive reviews, with critics highlighting Jon's storyline and the High Sparrow's introduction. Based on 30 critic reviews, the episode received a 100% rating score approbation in Rotten Tomatoes from 30 reviews with an average score of 8.1 out of 10 and with the consensus "'High Sparrow' expertly weaves together characters from Game of Thrones' sprawling stories, though the episode ultimately belongs to Jon Snow, whose new position highlights unexpected qualities."

Critical response to changes from the books and to original material written specifically for the episode were mixed. Critics seemed to be reserving judgment on the decision to bring Sansa to Winterfell, but Entertainment Weekly commentator Hilary Busis described this as "massively gross to watch [Tommen's] TV counterpart sleep with Margaery knowing that in A Feast for Crows, he’s still playing pretend with his beloved kitty," but Myles McNutt of A.V. Club found that the character's age gave him more agency. Both Busis and McNutt noted that the changes may make the story less cluttered, with Busis saying, "combining Sansa and [the Arya impostor]'s storylines allow Benioff and Weiss to trim a good bit of fat from ASOIAF and give already-introduced characters more stuff to do."

=== Awards and nominations ===
Year	Award	Category	Nominee(s)	Result	Ref.
2015	Primetime Creative Arts Emmy Awards	Outstanding Production Design for a Narrative Contemporary or Fantasy Program (One Hour or More)	Deborah Riley, Paul Ghirardani, Rob Cameron	Won	
2016	ADG Excellence in Production Design Award	One-Hour Single Camera Fantasy Television Series	Deborah Riley	Won	
2016	Visual Effects Society Awards	Outstanding Created Environment in an Episode, Commercial, or Real-Time Project	Dominic Piche, Christine Leclerc, Patrice Poissant, Thomas Montminy-Brodeur	Won	
