= High Sparrow =

Character in A Song of Ice and Fire and Game of Thrones

The High Sparrow
- A Song of Ice and Fire character Game of Thrones character
- Jonathan Pryce as The High Sparrow
- First appearance: Novel: A Feast for Crows (2005); Television: "High Sparrow" (2015)
- Last appearance: Television: "The Winds of Winter" (2016)
- Created by: George R. R. Martin
- Portrayed by: Jonathan Pryce

In-universe information
- Gender: Male
- Titles: High Septon; Father of the Faithful; Voice of the Seven on Earth

The High Sparrow is a fictional character in the A Song of Ice and Fire series of high fantasy novels by American author George R. R. Martin and its television adaptation, Game of Thrones.

The High Sparrow first appears in A Feast for Crows (2005) and subsequently appeared in Martin's A Dance with Dragons (2011). He is the de facto leader of the protest 'sparrow' movement that arises from the Faith of the Seven as a result of the carnage inflicted by the War of Five Kings. Although he appears to be humble and compassionate, his demeanor belies his shrewd and unrelenting religious fanaticism, which often borders on dangerous zealotry. He becomes of central importance to the shadow conflicts at court between Houses Lannister and Tyrell, and he is open about his disgust with the corruption and impiety of the capital. His true name is unknown; his title was given mockingly by political opponents as a comparison to the formal leader of the Faith, the High Septon.

The character is portrayed by Welsh actor Jonathan Pryce in the HBO television adaptation. The High Sparrow shares many similarities with Girolamo Savonarola, an Italian friar who de facto ruled the Republic of Florence from 1494 to 1498, denouncing clerical corruption, despotic rule and the exploitation of the poor.

== Character profile ==
The High Sparrow is a prominent member of the "sparrows", a religious movement formed during the War of the Five Kings, and a septon (or priest) in the Faith of the Seven. He is a small, thin, hard-eyed, grey-haired old man with a heavily lined face. He wears no rich robes or gold; instead, he wears a simple white wool tunic.

The High Sparrow is not a point-of-view character in the novels, so his actions are witnessed and interpreted through the eyes of other people, such as Cersei Lannister. The High Sparrow is mostly a background character in the novels.

== Storylines ==
=== A Feast for Crows ===
In the aftermath of the War of Five Kings, "sparrows", or religious folk seeking the protection of King Tommen Baratheon following a spate of atrocities committed against members of the Faith of the Seven, converge on King's Landing. When the Most Devout convene to elect the new High Septon, the sparrows hijack the selection process and force the selection of their leader, who is dubbed the "High Sparrow" by the royal fool, Moon Boy. Cersei Lannister permits the High Sparrow to re-establish the Faith Militant, the military arm of the Faith, in return for the Faith forgiving the Crown's debt to it and blessing Tommen. The Faith Militant subsequently arrests Margaery Tyrell and several of her cousins when Cersei's confidante, Osney Kettleblack, claims to have slept with the women. The High Sparrow is suspicious of Osney's testimony (not unfairly, as Osney had been persuaded to perjure Margaery by Cersei to shore up her own power) and has him tortured until he confesses not only that Cersei arranged for his false testimony, but also that she ordered him to kill the previous High Septon. When Cersei visits the Great Sept of Baelor, the High Sparrow has her arrested and imprisoned.

=== A Dance with Dragons ===
The High Sparrow releases Margaery and her cousins into Randyll Tarly's custody due to the weakness of the evidence against them, but he continues to hold Cersei prisoner. In order to obtain visitors, Cersei confesses to bedding the Kettleblack brothers as well as her cousin Lancel. The High Sparrow agrees to release her on condition of performing a walk of penance, naked, through the streets of King's Landing.

== TV adaptation ==
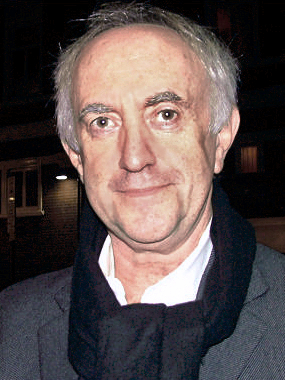
Jonathan Pryce plays the role of The High Sparrow in the television series.

The High Sparrow is played by the Welsh actor Jonathan Pryce in the television adaptation of the book series. Pryce admitted that one of the main reasons he took the role was because of how influential the character is plot-wise. Although he was initially quite skeptical about "sword and sorcery" shows, he later changed his mind after positive experiences on the Game of Thrones sets. Remarking on the character to Vulture.com, he said:

I quite like the fact that people are going, "Oh, he's a horrible character!" And I'm going, "No! He's one of the good people in Game of Thrones! He's clearing out all the bad people!"

=== Season 5 ===
The High Sparrow arrives in King's Landing after Tywin Lannister's death to serve the poor, downtrodden, and infirm. He quickly amasses a large following, including Cersei Lannister's cousin and former lover, Lancel, who are dubbed the "sparrows". He comes to the attention of Cersei after Lancel and the other sparrows force the High Septon to walk naked through the streets as punishment for soliciting prostitutes. The High Septon demands the High Sparrow's execution, but Cersei instead has the High Septon imprisoned and the High Sparrow appointed as his successor. To further gain his support, Cersei also reinstates the Faith Militant. Hoping to destabilise House Tyrell, Cersei arranges for the Faith Militant to arrest Loras Tyrell for homosexual acts, with Margaery also arrested when she lies in an attempt to exonerate him. However, Lancel confesses to his affair with Cersei, as well as their combined role in Robert Baratheon's death. Cersei is subsequently arrested when she visits the Great Sept of Baelor. She eventually confesses to her adultery with Lancel to secure her release and is ordered to walk naked through the streets of King's Landing as punishment.

=== Season 6 ===
The High Sparrow is confronted by Jaime Lannister, who is furious at Cersei's treatment by him, but Jaime is forced to stand down when the Faith Militant surrounds him. When Tommen begins visiting the High Sparrow to negotiate visits with Margaery, he begins to fall under the High Sparrow's influence. Jaime marches on the Great Sept with the Tyrell army to secure Margaery and Loras's release but is stopped when Tommen reveals that he has formed an alliance between the Crown and the Faith. The High Sparrow's control over Tommen leads him to abolish trial by combat, preventing Cersei from being absolved through that method.

Tommen announces that Loras and Margaery's trials will be held on the same day, but on the day of the trial, both Cersei and Tommen fail to appear. Margaery realises that Cersei has set a trap and tries to persuade the High Sparrow to evacuate the Great Sept, but he refuses and orders the Faith Militant to restrain the crowd. Moments later, wildfire prepared by Cersei's subordinate, Qyburn, explodes beneath the Sept, instantly vaporizing the High Sparrow in the blast.
