= The House of Black and White =

- Game of Thrones episode
- Episode no.: Season 5 Episode 2
- Directed by: Michael Slovis
- Written by: David Benioff; D. B. Weiss
- Cinematography by: David Franco
- Editing by: Katie Weiland
- Original air date: April 19, 2015
- Running time: 55 minutes

Guest appearances
- Peter Vaughan as Maester Aemon; Ian McElhinney as Ser Barristan Selmy; Julian Glover as Grand Maester Pycelle; Anton Lesser as Qyburn; Tara Fitzgerald as Selyse Baratheon; Owen Teale as Ser Alliser Thorne; Alexander Siddig as Doran Martell; Jacob Anderson as Grey Worm; Ben Crompton as Edd Tollett; Dominic Carter as Janos Slynt; Daniel Portman as Podrick Payne; Roger Ashton-Griffiths as Mace Tyrell; Joel Fry as Hizdahr zo Loraq; DeObia Oparei as Areo Hotah; Ian Gelder as Kevan Lannister; Ian Beattie as Ser Meryn Trant; Reece Noi as Mossador; Kerry Ingram as Shireen Baratheon; Brenock O'Connor as Olly; Nell Tiger Free as Myrcella Baratheon; Toby Sebastian as Trystane Martell; Elizabeth Cadwallader as Lollys Stokeworth; Brian Fortune as Othell Yarwyck; Gary Oliver as Ternesio Terys; J. J. Murphy as Denys Mallister; Michael Condron as Bowen Marsh

Episode chronology
| ← Previous "The Wars to Come" | Next → "High Sparrow" |
- Game of Thrones season 5

"The House of Black and White" is the second episode of the fifth season of HBO's medieval fantasy television series Game of Thrones. The 42nd episode overall, it was written by series co-creators David Benioff and D. B. Weiss, and directed by Michael Slovis. It first aired on HBO on April 19, 2015.

In the episode, Arya Stark arrives in Braavos at the House of Black and White, but is denied entry. Stannis Baratheon offers to legitimize Jon Snow as a Stark and make him the Lord of Winterfell. The Night's Watch elects a new Lord Commander. Cersei Lannister receives a threatening message from Dorne, concerning her for Myrcella's safety. Ellaria Sand tries to convince Doran Martell to go to war. Brienne of Tarth and Podrick Payne encounter Petyr Baelish and Sansa Stark at an inn. Across the Narrow Sea, Tyrion Lannister and Varys travel to Volantis, and Daenerys Targaryen continues to fight against the Sons of the Harpy in Meereen.

Prior to airing, this episode, along with the other first four episodes of the season, were leaked online. According to HBO, the leak likely originated from a group of early access screeners that HBO authorized to receive the episode, so that they could prepare reviews ahead of their airdates. According to TorrentFreak, the leaked episodes were downloaded more than 100,000 times within three hours of being uploaded, and over a million times by the following day.

The episode received positive reviews from critics, who mainly praised the episode's character moments.

== Plot ==
=== In Braavos ===
Terys takes Arya to the House of Black and White, the headquarters of the Faceless Men, but the doorkeeper denies her entry. After wandering the streets of Braavos, Arya encounters the doorkeeper again, who brings her back to the temple and changes his face to that of Jaqen H'ghar's. He grants Arya entry, but tells her that she must become "no one".

=== At the Wall ===
Stannis, unable to rally House Stark's former allies to his cause, offers to legitimize Jon as a Stark and make him Lord of Winterfell if Jon pledges his service to him. Jon plans to decline, but before he can tell Stannis, he is nominated by Sam to be the new Lord Commander. Jon defeats Ser Alliser after Maester Aemon casts a tiebreaker vote.

=== In the Vale ===
Brienne and Podrick stop at an inn, where they encounter Petyr and Sansa. Brienne asks Sansa to leave with her, but Sansa refuses. Petyr tries to capture Brienne, but she escapes with Podrick. Podrick suggests that since both Stark girls have refused her protection, Brienne is released from her vow to Catelyn Stark, but Brienne distrusts Petyr and decides to follow them.

=== In King's Landing ===
In King's Landing, Cersei and Jaime receive a message from Dorne: Myrcella's necklace in the jaws of a viper. Recognizing the threat, Jaime tells Cersei that he will infiltrate Dorne and retrieve Myrcella. He meets Bronn with his betrothed Lollys Stokeworth at Castle Stokeworth and tells him that if he helps him rescue Myrcella, he will be wed to a woman with a larger castle.

At a Small Council meeting, Cersei announces that she will sit in until Tommen chooses a new Hand. She makes Mace Tyrell Master of Coin and Qyburn Master of Whisperers, but her Uncle Kevan declines the office of Master of War and states that he will return to Casterly Rock until he hears directly from Tommen.

=== In Dorne ===
Ellaria Sand returns to Dorne following Oberyn's death. She attempts to persuade Prince Doran to kill Myrcella and go to war with House Lannister in a pursuit for vengeance. Doran refuses.

=== In the Flatlands ===
As Tyrion and Varys travel through the Flatlands on their way to Volantis, Varys attempts to motivate Tyrion by reminding him of his skill in ruling.

=== In Meereen ===
Daario and Grey Worm capture a member of the Sons of the Harpy. Mossador, a freedman sitting on Daenerys' council, kills the captive before the trial. Daenerys executes Mossador publicly, inciting a riot between freedmen and masters. At night, Drogon visits Daenerys at the Great Pyramid but flies away.

== Production ==
=== Writing ===
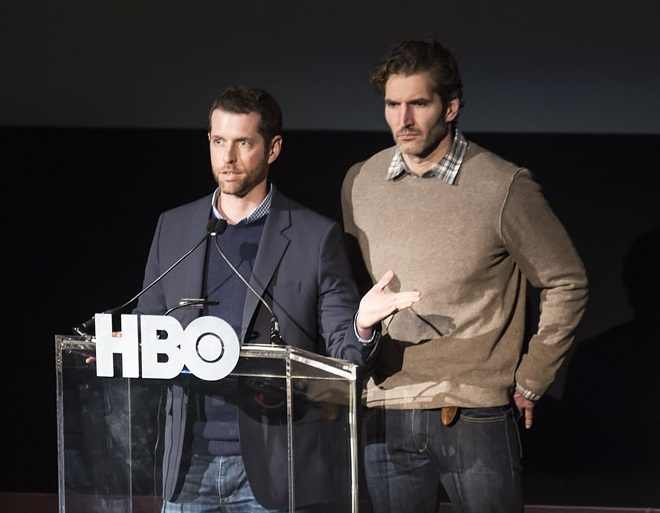
The episode was written by series co-creators David Benioff and D. B. Weiss.

This episode was written by executive producers David Benioff and D. B. Weiss and contains content from three of George R. R. Martin's novels, A Storm of Swords Jon XI and Jon XII, A Feast for Crows, Arya I, the Captain of Guards, Cersei IV and partial Cersei II and A Dance with Dragons, chapter Tyrion II and partial Jon I.

As in the previous episode, several scenes were written specifically for "The House of Black and White" and do not appear in the books. For example, Myles McNutt of The A.V. Club commented on the scene in which Brienne meets Sansa, who rejects her offer of help and protection, saying that it creates crisis regarding the character's purpose.

=== Casting ===
With this episode, Tom Wlaschiha (Jaqen H'ghar) and Indira Varma (Ellaria Sand) are promoted to series regulars. Wlaschiha returns after last appearing in the second season. The episode has the introduction of new recurring cast members Alexander Siddig, who plays the Prince of Dorne: Doran Martell, DeObia Oparei, who plays his bodyguard Areo Hotah, and Toby Sebastian, who plays Doran's son Trystane Martell, while Nell Tiger Free replaces Aimee Richardson as the recurring character Myrcella Baratheon.

== Reception ==
=== Ratings ===
The episode was viewed by an estimated 6.81 million viewers during its initial airing in the United States, and received a 3.6 rating among adults 18-49. In the United Kingdom, the episode was viewed by 2.164 million viewers, making it the highest-rated broadcast that week. It also received 0.145 million timeshift viewers.

=== Critical reception ===
The episode received positive reviews from critics and audiences.

On the review aggregator website Rotten Tomatoes, 96% of 51 critics' reviews are positive, with an average rating of 8.3/10. The website's consensus reads: "Building upon the season opener, 'The House of Black and White' increases the intensity by calling upon some major characters to make some tough decisions." Matt Fowler from IGN gave the episode a rating of 8.8/10, stating: "'The House of Black and White' was a notably bigger, better episode than the Season 5 premiere. It not only brought Arya and Bronn back into the mix and introduced Dorne... it contained huge moments for Brienne, Dany, and Jon."
