= The Wars to Come =

- Game of Thrones episode
- Episode no.: Season 5 Episode 1
- Directed by: Michael Slovis
- Written by: David Benioff; D. B. Weiss
- Cinematography by: David Franco
- Editing by: Katie Weiland
- Original air date: April 12, 2015
- Running time: 52 minutes

Guest appearances
- Ciarán Hinds as Mance Rayder; Owen Teale as Alliser Thorne; Ian McElhinney as Ser Barristan Selmy; Julian Glover as Grand Maester Pycelle; Tara Fitzgerald as Selyse Baratheon; Roger Ashton-Griffiths as Mace Tyrell; Jacob Anderson as Grey Worm; Finn Jones as Loras Tyrell; Daniel Portman as Podrick Payne; Jodhi May as Maggy; Dominic Carter as Janos Slynt; Joel Fry as Hizdahr zo Loraq; Ben Crompton as Edd Tollett; Eugene Simon as Lancel Lannister; Will Tudor as Olyvar; Rupert Vansittart as Yohn Royce; Ian Beattie as Ser Meryn Trant; Ian Gelder as Kevan Lannister; Brenock O'Connor as Olly; Kerry Ingram as Shireen Baratheon; Paul Bentley as the High Septon; Reece Noi as Mossador; Michael Condron as Bowen Marsh; Lino Facioli as Robin Arryn; Nell Williams as young Cersei Lannister

Episode chronology
← Previous "The Children"	Next → "The House of Black and White"
- Game of Thrones season 5

"The Wars to Come" is the first episode of the fifth season of HBO's medieval fantasy television series Game of Thrones, and the 41st overall. The episode was directed by Michael Slovis, his directorial debut for the series, and written by series co-creates David Benioff and D. B. Weiss. It first aired on April 12, 2015.

Prior to airing, the episode, along with the other first four episodes of the season, were leaked online. According to HBO, the leak likely originated from a group of early access screeners that HBO authorized to receive the episode, so that they could prepare reviews ahead of their airdates. According to TorrentFreak, the leaked episodes were downloaded more than 100,000 times within three hours of being uploaded, and over a million times by the following day.

The episode received positive reviews, with many critics singling out Peter Dinklage's performance and his returning comic relief role. It marks the final appearances of Charles Dance (Tywin Lannister) and Ciarán Hinds (Mance Rayder).

== Plot ==
=== Prologue, in the Westerlands ===
A young Cersei meets Maggy the Frog, a fortune teller. Cersei demands to know whether or not she will marry Prince Rhaegar Targaryen and have his children. Maggy informs her that she will instead be wed to "the king" (Robert Baratheon) and she will have three children, who will wear golden crowns, but also golden shrouds (meaning they will all die), and that another queen, younger and more beautiful than Cersei, will cast her down.

=== In King's Landing ===
Cersei arrives at the Sept of Baelor to pay her respects to Tywin and chastises Jaime for freeing Tyrion. At the wake, Cersei is approached by Lancel, who has become a member of the Sparrows, a religious group devoted to the Faith of the Seven. Lancel apologizes to Cersei for their affair and for getting Robert drunk before the hunt in which he was mortally wounded, but Cersei feigns ignorance.

Margaery catches Loras abed with Olyvar and warns him to be more discreet. Loras tells Margaery that no one can force Cersei to marry him now that Tywin is dead, but Cersei will remain in King's Landing instead of going to Highgarden. Margaery hints that she has a solution.

=== In Pentos ===
Tyrion and Varys arrive in Pentos. Varys tells Tyrion that he and Illyrio Mopatis worked in secret to make Daenerys the new ruler of Westeros and convinces him to travel to Meereen to meet her.

=== In Meereen ===
One of the Unsullied is killed by a member of Sons of the Harpy, an insurgency of former masters. Daenerys orders Grey Worm to find the killer.

Daario and Hizdahr return from Yunkai and tell Daenerys that the Wise Masters will turn over power to a council of former slaves and former masters, in return for the reopening of the fighting pits, where slaves fought to the death. Daenerys refuses, despite Daario's insistence that she reconsider. Daenerys visits her dragons under the Great Pyramid but leaves when they try to attack her.

=== In the Vale ===
Lord Yohn Royce agrees to take Robin Arryn as his ward. Petyr tells Royce that he and Sansa will travel to the Fingers, but they instead head west. Meanwhile, Brienne and Podrick ponder their next move, unaware that Sansa's carriage has just passed them.

=== At the Wall ===
Stannis wants Jon to persuade Mance to bend the knee and have the wildlings fight for Stannis so that he can take back the North from Roose Bolton. Mance refuses and is sentenced to burn at the stake. Out of mercy, Jon shoots him dead before he succumbs to the fire.

== Production ==
=== Writing ===
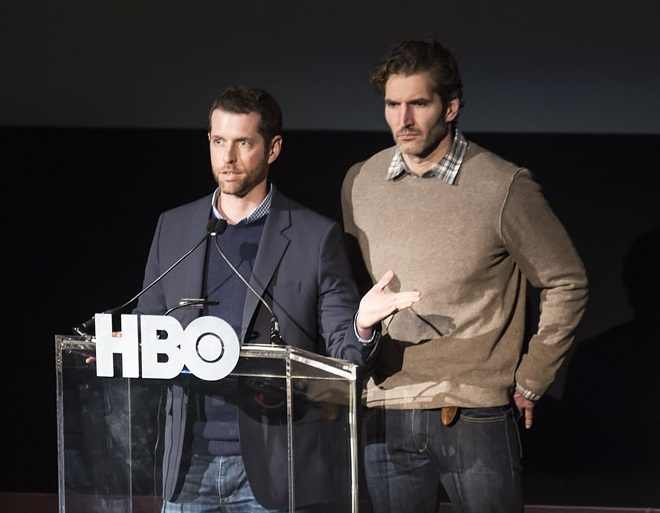
The episode was written by series co-creators David Benioff and D. B. Weiss.

This episode was written by executive producers David Benioff and D. B. Weiss and contains content from three of George Martin's novels, A Storm of Swords, partial Samwell IV and partial Jon IX, A Feast for Crows, chapters Cersei II, Cersei III, Jaime I, and Cersei VIII and A Dance with Dragons, chapters Tyrion I, Daenerys I, and partial Jon III. The episode marked the first usage of flashbacks, a trope previously avoided to prevent the story from becoming more convoluted than it already was. Flashbacks are also avoided because the writers do not wish to take away from the current plot, as it allows viewers to see the reaction of characters in the present, something that would not be as easy with flashbacks.

=== Casting ===
With this episode, Michiel Huisman (Daario Naharis), Nathalie Emmanuel (Missandei) and Dean-Charles Chapman (Tommen Baratheon) are promoted to series regulars. Ian Gelder (Kevan Lannister) and Eugene Simon (Lancel Lannister) make return appearances after an absence of several years (since the second season).

== Reception ==
=== Ratings ===
"The Wars to Come" was watched by 8 million viewers during its initial airing, making it the show's most watched episode to date until it was surpassed by the season finale, "Mother's Mercy" (8.1 million). 10.1 million viewers watched the episode on DVR or streaming platforms during its first week, bringing net viewership to 18.1 million. In the UK, on Sky Atlantic, the episode broke the record for the highest viewer rating on the channel, with 2.63 million tuning in, It also received 0.145 million timeshift viewers. According to HBO, total viewership rose to 18 million over the next three weeks as more people watched the episode through other venues, such as streaming.

=== Critical reception ===
Reception to the episode has been positive. Based on 48 critic reviews, the episode received a 96% score from Rotten Tomatoes with an average score of 7.82 out of 10, with the site's consensus reading: "A solid season premiere, "The Wars to Come" ratchets up the anticipation for inevitable bloodshed while deepening focus on characters and locales." BBC's Keith Uhlich praised the episode and the episode's "ostensible lead", Peter Dinklage, proclaiming that in the first season the character "provided comic relief" but has since "become more central to the narrative". He concluded stating "it's a show as capable of portraying one character's specific longings as it is widening its gaze to take in a soul-stirring view. And it always leaves the viewer wondering what other lands and adventures might lie over the horizon." Matt Fowler from IGN gave it a mostly positive review stating "[the series] is off to a good start with this solid, though not stunning, premiere". He criticized the episode's character development saying "it's part of the show's harrowing design to constantly thin the herd [but] we do reach a point where we run low on character to really care about/connect with/invest in." He gave the episode a rating of 8.2 out of 10.

The A.V. Club published two reviews, as they have done for each prior episode. Erik Adams wrote the review for people who have not read the novels, and gave the episode a "B" rating. Myles McNutt, who reviewed the episode for people who have read the novels, positively reviewed the episode although he criticized the episode's overuse of filming locations stating "you wish you could spend more than three scenes in a given location". However, he expressed his excitement towards the series "offering new perspectives on those events offered by a less rigid approach to characterization, and creating new material out of whole cloth to push the story and its characters forward." Charlotte Runcie of The Daily Telegraph gave it a four out of five star review and stated "the beginning of season five was a promise of more greatness to come" concluding that "this wasn't the most dramatic episode so far, but the acting and writing were sharper than ever."
