= Game of Thrones season 5 =

Game of Thrones
- Season 5
- Region 1 DVD artwork
- Showrunners: David Benioff; D. B. Weiss
- Starring: Peter Dinklage; Nikolaj Coster-Waldau; Lena Headey; Emilia Clarke; Kit Harington; Aidan Gillen; Charles Dance; Natalie Dormer; Indira Varma; Stephen Dillane; Liam Cunningham; Carice van Houten; John Bradley; Sophie Turner; Kristofer Hivju; Hannah Murray; Conleth Hill; Gwendoline Christie; Michiel Huisman; Nathalie Emmanuel; Dean-Charles Chapman; Maisie Williams; Jerome Flynn; Tom Wlaschiha; Alfie Allen; Michael McElhatton; Iwan Rheon; Iain Glen
- No. of episodes: 10

Release
- Original network: HBO
- Original release: April 12 – June 14, 2015

Season chronology
- ← Previous; Season 4 Next → Season 6

The fifth season of the fantasy drama television series Game of Thrones premiered on HBO on April 12, and concluded on June 14, 2015. It was broadcast on Sunday at 9:00 pm in the United States, consisting of 10 episodes, each running approximately 50–60 minutes. Based on George R. R. Martin's A Song of Ice and Fire novel series, the fifth season takes loose inspiration from A Feast for Crows and A Dance with Dragons, the fourth and fifth novels in the series, while also including the remaining elements from the third novel, A Storm of Swords, as well as the upcoming sixth novel The Winds of Winter. It also contains original content not found in Martin's novels. The series is adapted for television by David Benioff and D. B. Weiss.

Like previous seasons in Game of Thrones, the fifth season continues storylines primarily set within the fictional land of Westeros, while a few storylines are set in another continent, Essos. After the murders of King Joffrey and his grandfather Tywin Lannister, Cersei Lannister’s young, indecisive son, Tommen, rules Westeros as king. Tyrion flees to Essos, where he meets Daenerys Targaryen, who struggles to rule Slaver's Bay and regain control over her growing dragons. The Lannister family encounters new enemies, including a religious cult that Cersei foolishly empowers; they arrest her and Queen Margaery; Cersei confesses some sins and is released after a walk of atonement. Jon Snow becomes Lord Commander of the Night's Watch and serves under Stannis Baratheon, who pursues his claim to the Iron Throne by marching on the rebuilt Winterfell. Littlefinger has left Sansa Stark at Winterfell; she marries Ramsay Bolton, who rapes and imprisons her. Stannis is defeated and killed, while Sansa makes an escape with Theon. After Jon loses Night's Watchmen trying to rescue thousands of Wildlings from the White Walkers, several of his men mutiny and kill him. In Braavos, Arya Stark receives training as an assassin but disobeys her trainers, who blind her. Jaime retrieves princess Myrcella from Dorne, but she is murdered.

HBO ordered the fifth season on April 8, 2014, together with the sixth season, which began filming in July 2014. The season was filmed primarily in Ireland, Northern Ireland, Croatia and Spain.

Game of Thrones features a large ensemble cast, including Peter Dinklage, Nikolaj Coster-Waldau, Lena Headey, Emilia Clarke and Kit Harington. The season introduced a number of new cast members, including Jonathan Pryce and Alexander Siddig.

Critics praised the show's production values and cast, giving specific accolades for Dinklage's portrayal of Tyrion Lannister, though some deemed it inferior to previous seasons. Viewership yet again rose compared to the previous season. This season set a Guinness World Record for winning the highest number of Emmy Awards for a series in a single season and year, winning 12 out of 24 nominations, including Outstanding Drama Series.

== Episodes ==
No. overall	No. in season	Title	Directed by	Written by	Original release date	U.S. viewers (millions)
41	1	"The Wars to Come"	Michael Slovis	David Benioff & D. B. Weiss	April 12, 2015	8.00
In a flashback, a witch foretells a teenage Cersei Lannister that she will one day be a queen until a younger and more beautiful queen usurps her. The witch also predicts Cersei will have three children and her king husband will have twenty. In the present, her father, Tywin Lannister, is buried, and her cousin, Lancel Lannister, returns, now a devoted convert of a fanatical religious sect of the Faith of the Seven called the "Sparrows". In Pentos on Essos, a despondent Tyrion Lannister accompanies Varys to Meereen to meet Daenerys Targaryen, who Varys believes may be worthy of the Iron Throne. In Meereen, the insurgent Sons of the Harpy murder an Unsullied. Daenerys angrily resists restoring old local traditions, including reopening the fighting pits. Missandei asks Unsullied commander Grey Worm why some Unsullied visit brothels. Daenerys visits her two confined dragons, who act aggressively toward her. In the Vale of Arryn, Petyr "Littlefinger" Baelish puts Robin Arryn in House Royce's care when he and Sansa Stark depart. At the Wall, Stannis Baratheon seeks to recruit the wildlings to his war against Roose Bolton, offering citizenship and land as a reward. Jon Snow is unable to persuade Mance Rayder to "bend the knee" to Stannis. As Mance is burned alive, Jon ends his agony with an arrow to the heart.
42	2	"The House of Black and White"	Michael Slovis	David Benioff & D. B. Weiss	April 19, 2015	6.81
Arya Stark arrives in Braavos and is accepted into the House of Black and White by Jaqen H'ghar, who calls himself and his colleagues "no one". Jaime Lannister recruits Bronn to travel to Dorne with him to retrieve Jaime's niece-daughter, Myrcella Baratheon, who is now betrothed to Prince Trystane Martell, Prince Doran Martell's son. Podrick Payne recognises Littlefinger and Sansa in a tavern; Brienne of Tarth offers Sansa her protection but is rebuffed. Littlefinger insists Brienne come with them, but she refuses and escapes with Podrick, then secretly follows Sansa. Stannis offers Jon legitimacy and lordship of Winterfell if he leaves the Night's Watch and supports him, but Jon keeps his vow to the Night's Watch. Samwell Tarly nominates Jon as Lord Commander against Alliser Thorne; Maester Aemon casts his ballot for Jon, breaking a tie vote. Daenerys incites a riot by executing a former slave who murdered a Sons of the Harpy prisoner prior to his trial. Drogon reappears, but soon leaves.
43	3	"High Sparrow"	Mark Mylod	David Benioff & D. B. Weiss	April 26, 2015	6.71
Margaery Tyrell, newly wed to King Tommen Baratheon, manipulates her husband to consider sending Cersei to Casterly Rock to eliminate her interference. Littlefinger takes Sansa to Winterfell to cement an alliance with Roose Bolton through a marriage between his son, Ramsay Bolton, and Sansa without the Lannisters' knowledge. Sansa's unconsummated marriage with Tyrion is considered void. Brienne trains Podrick in swordsmanship. To conform to the House of Black and White, Arya tosses her personal effects into the harbor, but hides her sword, Needle, in a pile of rocks. At Castle Black, Jon names Thorne First Ranger. When Janos Slynt disobeys Jon's orders, Jon executes him. Lancel discovers the High Septon in a brothel, and he is forced to walk the streets nude as punishment. The High Septon protests to Cersei, who imprisons him. She meets with the High Sparrow, approving the Sparrows' actions. Tyrion and Varys arrive in Volantis. Soon after, Tyrion is abducted by Jorah Mormont, who is intending to give him "to the queen".
44	4	"Sons of the Harpy"	Mark Mylod	Dave Hill	May 3, 2015	6.82
Cersei authorizes arming the Sparrows as the Faith Militant, who then arrest Loras Tyrell for homosexuality. Queen Margaery is enraged, but Tommen proves too weak to countermand them. Melisandre attempts to seduce Jon as a means to convince him to accompany Stannis to Winterfell. In Winterfell, before Littlefinger heads to King's Landing, he dispels Sansa's misgivings about marrying Ramsay, promising that Stannis will defeat the Boltons and rescue her, and even if not, she can manipulate Ramsay. Bronn and Jaime secretly land in Dorne to retrieve Myrcella; hearing this, Ellaria Sand and her Sand Snakes plot to avenge Oberyn Martell's death by abducting Myrcella. Jorah intends to redeem himself to Daenerys by presenting Tyrion as a prisoner. In Meereen, Hizdahr zo Loraq again appeals to Daenerys to reopen the fighting pits, a local tradition; the Sons of the Harpy ambush an Unsullied patrol inside the citadel, critically wounding Grey Worm and killing Ser Barristan Selmy.
45	5	"Kill the Boy"	Jeremy Podeswa	Bryan Cogman	May 10, 2015	6.56
Brienne and Podrick arrive at an inn near Winterfell and smuggle a message to Sansa, offering her help if it is needed. Sansa discovers Theon is at Winterfell, and Ramsay forces him to apologize to her for supposedly killing her younger brothers. At the Wall, Tormund Giantsbane agrees to an alliance with the Night's Watch in return for the wildlings to settle south of the Wall. Jon and Tormund travel to Hardhome to persuade the wildlings. Stannis's army leaves for Winterfell, taking his family and Melisandre with them. In Meereen, as Grey Worm recuperates, he and Misandei develop romantic feelings. Daenerys feeds one Meereen nobleman to her dragons, Viserion and Rhaegal, and imprisons the others. She later agrees to reopen the fighting pits and weds Hizdahr to facilitate peace. At sea, Tyrion and Jorah sail through Valyria, seeing Drogon flying overhead. Stone men attack them, and they escape, but Jorah is infected with greyscale.
46	6	"Unbowed, Unbent, Unbroken"	Jeremy Podeswa	Bryan Cogman	May 17, 2015	6.24
Jaqen takes Arya to a chamber filled with the faces of dead people. Jaime and Bronn reach the Water Gardens and find Myrcella with Trystane. The Sand Snakes attack them, but Dornish guards arrive and arrest everyone. Jorah and Tyrion are captured by pirates. They narrowly escape slavery when Tyrion manages to talk their way to the fighting pits of Meereen. Littlefinger informs Cersei that Roose Bolton intends to marry Sansa to Ramsay. He offers to lead the knights of the Vale to Winterfell to defeat whichever weakened side wins the conflict between Roose and Stannis. If successful, Littlefinger will be named Warden of the North. Olenna Tyrell arrives in King's Landing and warns Cersei that imprisoning Loras has jeopardized their alliance. At Loras' inquest, Loras and Margaery both deny his homosexuality. The male prostitute, Olyvar, contradicts their testimony, and Margaery is arrested for lying to the gods. Tommen is uncertain and ineffective. At Winterfell, Sansa weds Ramsay. On their wedding night, Ramsay rapes her in front of Theon.
47	7	"The Gift"	Miguel Sapochnik	David Benioff & D. B. Weiss	May 24, 2015	5.40
Jon leaves for Hardhome with Tormund and some rangers. Maester Aemon dies shortly after. Gilly is attacked by two Watchmen. Sam intervenes and is overpowered until Ghost threatens them. Samwell and Gilly consummate their relationship. Sansa begs Theon to help her escape Winterfell, but instead he informs Ramsay, who then flays Brienne's informant inside Winterfell. At his army camp, Stannis refuses Melisandre's request to sacrifice Shireen to gain the Lord of Light's favor. Jorah and Tyrion are sold to a slaver, Yezzan, and are taken to Daznak's fighting pit. Daenerys and her consort, Hizdahr, inspect the pit in preparation for the upcoming games. Jorah defeats the other fighters, reveals his identity, and Tyrion appears as his "gift" to her. In Dorne, while in the dungeon, Tyene Sand gives Bronn the antidote to a poison called "The Long Farewell" that she has infected him with. Prince Doran allows Jaime to take Myrcella and her fiancé, Prince Trystane, to King's Landing. The High Sparrow denies Olenna's demand that Loras and Margaery be released. The High Sparrow then arrests Cersei for her previous affair with her cousin Lancel.
48	8	"Hardhome"	Miguel Sapochnik	David Benioff & D. B. Weiss	May 31, 2015	7.01
Cersei's uncle, Kevan Lannister, is appointed as the Hand of the King. Cersei refuses to confess her crimes. Jaqen tasks Arya to study a marine insurance vendor who defrauds beneficiaries. Disguised as a shellfish peddler, she is to first learn about the insurer and then poison him. Theon tells Sansa that he faked killing Brandon and Rickon. Ramsay asks Roose for twenty men to attack Stannis's camp. In Meereen, Tyrion convinces Daenerys to spare Jorah's life; she does but exiles him again. Jorah returns to Yezzan and asks to fight in the pits. Daenerys accepts Tyrion into her council. Arriving in Hardhome, Jon and Tormund recruit five thousand wildlings, but an army of wights attacks them. Jon kills a White Walker with Longclaw, his Valyrian steel sword. As he, Tormund, and the other survivors escape by sea, they witness the Night King reanimating the dead wildlings.
49	9	"The Dance of Dragons"	David Nutter	David Benioff & D. B. Weiss	June 7, 2015	7.14
Ramsay leads a covert attack on Stannis' camp, destroying siege equipment, food stores, and killing many horses. After dispatching Davos to Castle Black to request more supplies, Stannis, with Selyse's approval, allows Melisandre to sacrifice Shireen, burning her alive at the stake, believing it will help win the war. Jon and the other survivors return to the Wall, allowing the wildlings to pass South. In Dorne, Prince Doran has permitted Jaime and Bronn to return to King's Landing with Myrcella, provided Trystane accompanies them and serves on the small council in Oberyn's stead. Doran also pardons Ellaria and her daughters. Arya aborts her first assassination assignment after spotting Ser Meryn Trant accompanying Mace Tyrell, the Master of Coin, who has arrived in Braavos to negotiate with the Iron Bank. In Meereen, combat at Daznak's fighting pit resumes. Daenerys is stunned that Jorah is among the fighters. His victory is interrupted when the Sons of the Harpy launch a surprise attack. Hizdahr is killed while Jorah saves Daenerys. The Harpies quickly swarm Daenerys and her supporters, forcing them and Jorah to retreat into the pit. Drogon suddenly arrives, burning many Sons of the Harpy; Daenerys mounts Drogon and commands him to fly away.
50	10	"Mother's Mercy"	David Nutter	David Benioff & D. B. Weiss	June 14, 2015	8.11
Selyse, now distraught over Shireen's death, hangs herself, while half of Stannis' forces desert and Melisandre flees to Castle Black. The Boltons easily defeat Stannis' depleted army. Brienne finds Stannis on the battlefield and executes him for Renly Baratheon's murder. Theon kills Myranda after she catches him and Sansa attempting to escape Winterfell. The duo leaps from the Wall together. Cersei confesses her former relationship with Lancel and must atone by parading the streets naked, pelted with garbage, spit, and feces by jeering crowds. Upon reaching the Red Keep, Qyburn introduces her to the newest Kingsguard member, the reanimated Mountain, who is completely loyal. Jaime, Myrcella, Bronn, and Trystane set sail from Dorne, but Myrcella has been poisoned by Ellaria Sand and soon dies. Arya is punished, losing her sight, for violating the Faceless Men rules after killing Ser Meryn Trant for personal revenge. Varys arrives in Meereen to govern the city with Tyrion, Grey Worm, and Missandei, while Daario and Jorah search for Daenerys, who has been captured by a Dothraki horde. Samwell, Gilly, and Little Sam leave Castle Black for Oldtown, where Samwell will train as a Maester. Mutineers, including Alliser Thorne and Jon's steward, Olly, fatally stab Jon, leaving his body in the courtyard.

== Cast ==
=== Main cast ===
- Peter Dinklage as Tyrion Lannister
- Nikolaj Coster-Waldau as Jaime Lannister
- Lena Headey as Cersei Lannister
- Emilia Clarke as Daenerys Targaryen
- Kit Harington as Jon Snow
- Aidan Gillen as Petyr "Littlefinger" Baelish
- Charles Dance as Tywin Lannister
- Natalie Dormer as Margaery Tyrell
- Indira Varma as Ellaria Sand
- Stephen Dillane as Stannis Baratheon
- Liam Cunningham as Davos Seaworth
- Carice van Houten as Melisandre
- John Bradley as Samwell Tarly
- Sophie Turner as Sansa Stark
- Kristofer Hivju as Tormund Giantsbane
- Hannah Murray as Gilly
- Conleth Hill as Varys
- Gwendoline Christie as Brienne of Tarth
- Michiel Huisman as Daario Naharis
- Nathalie Emmanuel as Missandei
- Dean-Charles Chapman as Tommen Baratheon
- Maisie Williams as Arya Stark
- Jerome Flynn as Bronn
- Tom Wlaschiha as Jaqen H'ghar
- Alfie Allen as Theon Greyjoy / "Reek"
- Michael McElhatton as Roose Bolton
- Iwan Rheon as Ramsay Bolton
- Iain Glen as Jorah Mormont

=== Guest cast ===
The recurring actors listed here are those who appeared in season 5. They are listed by the region in which they first appear:

==== At and beyond the Wall ====
- Peter Vaughan as Maester Aemon
- Owen Teale as Alliser Thorne
- Brian Fortune as Othell Yarwyck
- Michael Condron as Bowen Marsh
- Dominic Carter as Janos Slynt
- Ben Crompton as Eddison Tollett
- J. J. Murphy as Denys Mallister
- Will O'Connell as Todder
- Brenock O'Connor as Olly
- Ciarán Hinds as Mance Rayder
- Birgitte Hjort Sørensen as Karsi
- Zahary Baharov as Loboda
- Ross O'Hennessy as the Lord of Bones
- Murray McArthur as Dim Dalba
- Ian Whyte as Wun Wun
- Ali Lyons as Johnna
- Richard Brake as the Night King

==== In the North ====
- Elizabeth Webster as Walda Bolton
- Tara Fitzgerald as Selyse Florent
- Kerry Ingram as Shireen Baratheon
- Charlotte Hope as Myranda

==== In the Vale ====
- Lino Facioli as Robin Arryn
- Rupert Vansittart as Yohn Royce
- Daniel Portman as Podrick Payne

==== In Dorne ====
- Alexander Siddig as Doran Martell
- Toby Sebastian as Trystane Martell
- Keisha Castle-Hughes as Obara Sand
- Rosabell Laurenti Sellers as Tyene Sand
- Jessica Henwick as Nymeria Sand
- Nell Tiger Free as Myrcella Baratheon
- DeObia Oparei as Areo Hotah

==== In King's Landing ====
- Julian Glover as Grand Maester Pycelle
- Anton Lesser as Qyburn
- Ian Gelder as Kevan Lannister
- Roger Ashton-Griffiths as Mace Tyrell
- Finn Jones as Loras Tyrell
- Diana Rigg as Olenna Tyrell
- Eugene Simon as Lancel Lannister
- Ian Beattie as Meryn Trant
- Hafþór Júlíus Björnsson as Gregor Clegane
- Paul Bentley as the High Septon
- Jonathan Pryce as the High Sparrow
- Hannah Waddingham as Septa Unella
- Will Tudor as Olyvar
- Josephine Gillan as Marei

==== In Braavos ====
- Mark Gatiss as Tycho Nestoris
- Gary Oliver as Ternesio Terys
- Oengus MacNamara as the thin man
- Faye Marsay as the Waif
- Sarine Sofair as Lhara
- Hattie Gotobed as Ghita

==== In Slaver's Bay ====
- Ian McElhinney as Barristan Selmy
- Jacob Anderson as Grey Worm
- Reece Noi as Mossador
- Joel Fry as Hizdahr zo Loraq
- Enzo Cilenti as Yezzan zo Qaggaz
- Adewale Akinnuoye-Agbaje as Malko
- Meena Rayann as Vala

== Production ==
=== Crew ===
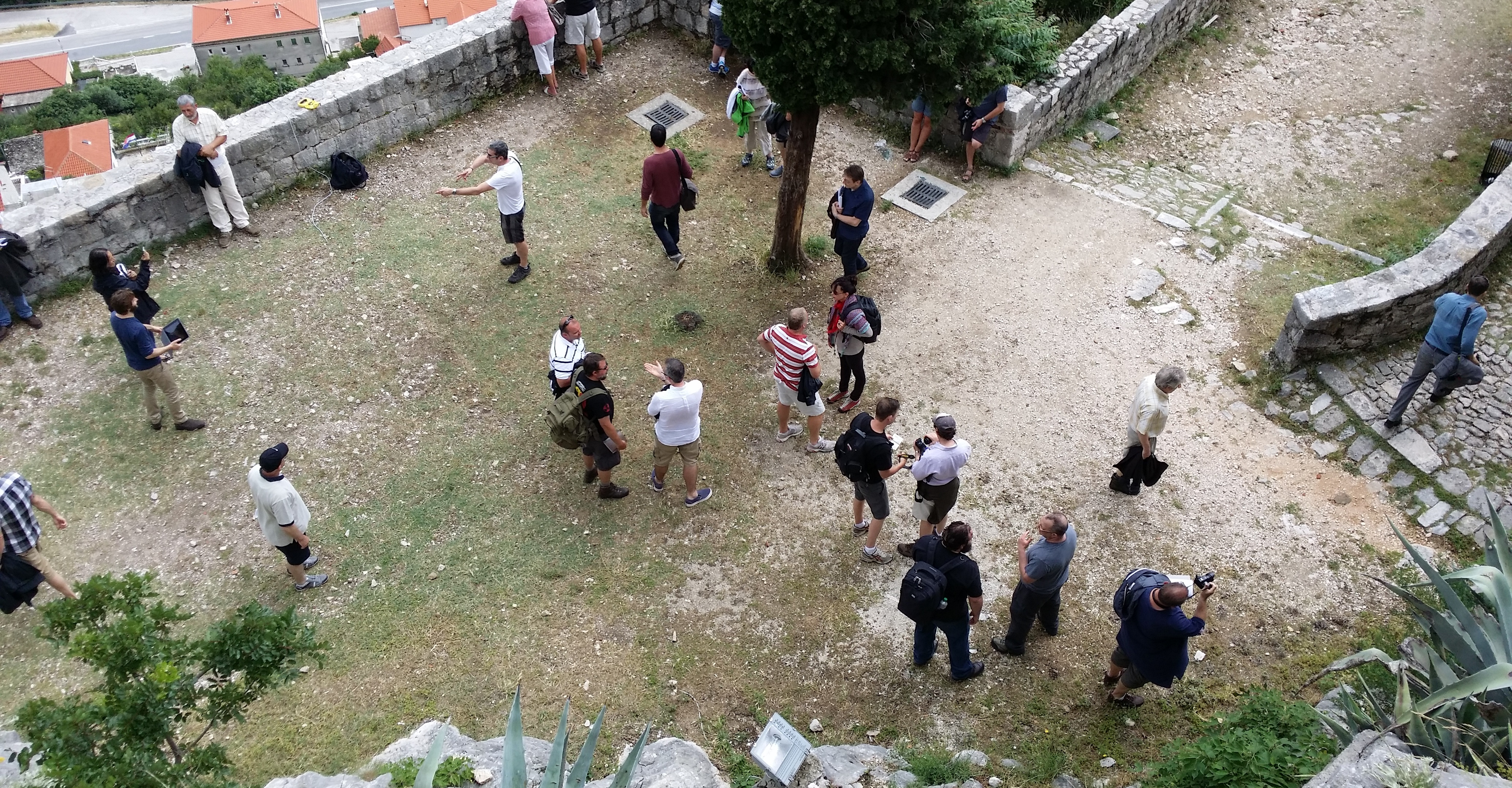
The production team during a location scouting at Klis Fortress, Croatia prior to season 5.

The writing staff for the fifth season includes executive producers and showrunners David Benioff and D. B. Weiss, producer Bryan Cogman, and Dave Hill, who was promoted to staff writer this season after previously working as an assistant to Benioff and Weiss. Author George R. R. Martin, who had written one episode for each of the first four seasons, did not write an episode for the fifth season as he was working to finish writing the sixth novel of the series, The Winds of Winter. The directing staff for the fifth season is Michael Slovis (episodes 1 and 2), Mark Mylod (episodes 3 and 4), Jeremy Podeswa (episodes 5 and 6), Miguel Sapochnik (episodes 7 and 8), and David Nutter (episodes 9 and 10). Nutter is the only returning director with the rest being first-time Game of Thrones directors.

=== Writing ===
This season features more original material than previous seasons. The deviations from Martin's novels are in part attributable to the way the television series has covered most of the novel series' published material and in part to the directors' opinions of the actors' abilities. For example, Sansa Stark arrives at Winterfell to marry Ramsay Bolton in "High Sparrow," a plotline that had been given to a minor character in the novels. In an interview, show writer David Benioff explains that Sophie Turner's development as an actress was one of the reasons that they decided to give her character more dramatic scenes, saying, "Even if [child actors] come in and do a great audition, it’s so hard to know if they’re going to quite literally grow into the parts. With Sansa and Arya in particular, their storylines have become quite dark. It was such a gamble and the fact that they’ve both become such great wonderful actresses is a bit of a miracle." Bryan Cogman added that it made more sense to give the Winterfell storyline to a proven actress who was already popular with viewers than to bring in a new character.

Other changes include the portrayal of Tommen as old enough to interact with Margaery and the Faith Militant as an adult, the speeding up or streamlining of several subplots, and the introduction of fewer new characters. According to Benioff and Weiss, "We felt we'd capsize the show if we put in every single character from the books." Critics particularly liked the decision to have Tyrion actually meet Daenerys at the end of "The Gift," which has yet to happen as of A Dance with Dragons. David Benioff cited the television adaptation's faster pace as part of the rationale behind this decision.

=== Filming ===
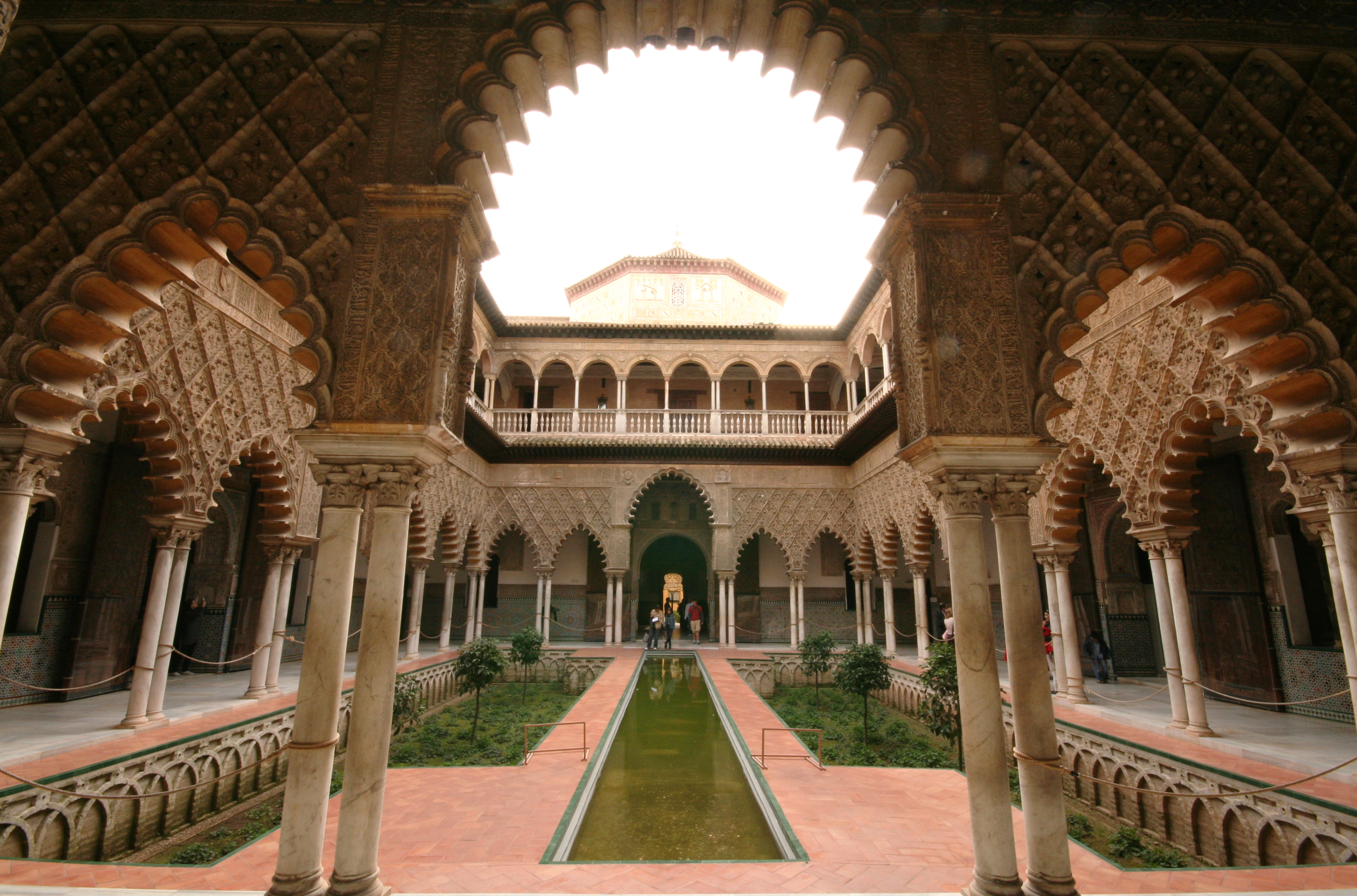
The Alcázar of Seville stands in for the Water Gardens of Dorne.

Filming for the fifth season began in July 2014 in Belfast and ended in December 2014. Locations in Northern Ireland included Titanic Studios, Belfast and the cliff edge of Binevenagh Mountain. The Winterfell sets were in the village of Moneyglass.

Some of the scenes that take place in the principality of Dorne were filmed in Spain, beginning in October 2014. Locations explored for the production included the Alcázar of Seville and the University of Osuna. On October 14, some scenes were filmed on the Roman bridge of Córdoba. Benioff and Weiss said that season 5 would include flashbacks, which they had previously avoided, and that Córdoba would represent the city of Volantis.

Cersei's "walk of atonement" from A Dance with Dragons was filmed in Dubrovnik, Croatia, in the Stradun street between the Dubrovnik Cathedral and the Sponza Palace in early October 2014. The production reportedly employed a body double for Lena Headey for part of the scene in which Cersei appears naked. Meereen scenes were once again shot in Diocletian's Palace in Split, and on Klis Fortress north of Split.

A town on the coast of the Bay of Kaštela in Croatia, the 16th century Kaštel Gomilica stood in for some parts of Braavos.

A very small portion of one episode was filmed in Calgary, Alberta, Canada: the scenes featuring Jon Snow's wolf Ghost (played by animal actor Quigly) who also appears in season 6.

=== Casting ===
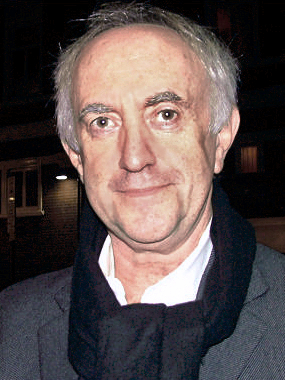
Jonathan Pryce plays the High Sparrow.

The fifth season adds previously recurring actors Indira Varma (Ellaria Sand), Michiel Huisman (Daario Naharis), Nathalie Emmanuel (Missandei), Dean-Charles Chapman (Tommen Baratheon), Tom Wlaschiha (Jaqen H'ghar) and Michael McElhatton (Roose Bolton) to the series' main cast.

In the fifth season, the region of Dorne is introduced as a location. Alexander Siddig joins the cast as Doran Martell, the ruling Prince of Dorne, and elder brother of Oberyn Martell, while his son Trystane Martell is portrayed by Toby Sebastian. The role of Cersei's daughter Myrcella Baratheon, who is Doran's ward and betrothed to Trystane is played by Nell Tiger Free. The role was portrayed by Aimee Richardson in the first two seasons. DeObia Oparei portrays Areo Hotah, the captain of the Dornish palace guard. The three eldest bastard daughters of Oberyn Martell (collectively known as the "Sand Snakes") are portrayed by Keisha Castle-Hughes (Obara Sand), Jessica Henwick (Nymeria Sand), and Rosabell Laurenti Sellers (Tyene Sand).

In King's Landing, Jonathan Pryce joins the cast as the High Sparrow, the leader of the militant faithful in King's Landing, while Hannah Waddingham portrays Septa Unella, one of the "Most Devout", the ruling council of the Faith of the Seven. Nell Williams was cast as a young Cersei Lannister seen in flashbacks, while Jodhi May was cast as Maggy the Frog, a fortune-teller.

Across the Narrow Sea, Enzo Cilenti joins as Yezzan, a Yunkish nobleman and slave trader, while Adewale Akinnuoye-Agbaje was cast as Malko, a slaver, who does not appear in the novels. At Castle Black and beyond the Wall, new cast members include Michael Condron as Bowen Marsh, First Steward of the Night's Watch. J. J. Murphy, who was cast as Night's Watch officer Denys Mallister, died in August 2014 shortly after filming his first scenes; his role was not recast. One role that was recast for season 5 was Ross O'Hennessy as the Lord of Bones. O'Hennessy replaces Edward Dogliani who was last seen in the season 3 premiere "Valar Dohaeris". Charles Dance, whose character died in the previous season, returned for one episode to portray Tywin Lannister's corpse. Isaac Hempstead-Wright (Bran Stark), Kristian Nairn (Hodor) and Ellie Kendrick (Meera Reed) are absent this season because their part in the story has reached the end of A Dance with Dragons.

=== Music ===
The soundtrack for the season was released digitally on June 9, 2015, and on CD on July 17, 2015.

== Reception ==
=== Critical response ===
Game of Thrones season 5: Critical reception by episode
Season 5 (2015): Percentage of positive critics' reviews tracked by the website Rotten Tomatoes

The fifth season was met with mostly positive reviews, though many deemed it to be weaker than its predecessors. On Metacritic, the season (based on the first four episodes) has a score of 91 out of 100 based on 29 reviews, indicating "universal acclaim". On Rotten Tomatoes, the fifth season has a 93% approval rating from 574 critics with an average rating of 8.6 out of 10. The site's critical consensus reads, "Bloody action and extreme power plays return full throttle, as Game of Thrones enjoys a new-found liberation from the world of the source material, resulting in more unexpected thrills."

The Daily Telegraph stated in regards to the premiere episode, "Essentially, this was an exercise in scene setting, the chess pieces being laid out on the board." New York Daily News praised the season to have "little trouble keeping its pedal to the metal" due to its "cold-blooded characters treating personnel turnover as the natural order", when other shows "are starting to run out of gas by Season 5". Slant Magazine gave the season 3.5 out of 4 and stated, "There's plenty of death in the fifth season of the show, and it's understood as a cautionary symbol of power." Vanity Fair called this season "rich, satisfying and fantastically put together". Variety gave the season a positive review and stated, "Operating on a scale like nothing else on TV, and creatively liberated to play a long game stretching into the future, perhaps no project better distinguishes HBO's status as the leading premium player." IndieWire gave the season a score of 'B+' and found the "first few episodes skew dry, concerned largely with the establishment of allegiances", but still praised them for keeping the audiences "connected to those who have managed to survive thus far in the battle for power."

The Boston Globe gave the season a positive review and stated, "The funny thing about Game of Thrones is that it's built on familiar genres and yet it appeals to those who may not be fans of those genres." James Poniewozik of Time gave the season a positive review and stated, "Game of Thrones is flying, full tilt, toward a destination off the edge of our map of the known world. I can't wait to see what it finds there." Salon.com gave the season a positive review and stated, "In the fifth season, the story has been distilled to just the moments of pathos and characterization and gorgeous direction that make the story work." Slate was concerned about the fact that the season "pulls even further away from the novels (the Sansa plot will drive some fans crazier than King Aerys)", though still thought it was "better for it".

The A.V. Club gave the season a score of 'A−' and stated, "Benioff and Weiss are making the same show but with slightly different rhythms, relying more on character shading and interplay than on staging the next massacre." Christopher Orr of The Atlantic found the season to be an improvement over the source material in terms of pace and focus. David Wiegand of the San Francisco Chronicle gave the season 4 out of 4 and eulogized the "greater sense of urgency", while The New York Times praised the "overall feeling of recharging and regeneration". Mary McNamara of the Los Angeles Times gave the season a positive review and stated, "Breathtaking, heartbreaking, awe-inspiring and addictive, it remains the single most remarkable feat of television, possibly ever, increasingly admirable for its ability to grow rather than simply sustain."

The only major publication to give the season a negative review was John Doyle of The Globe and Mail who stated, "A certain character says to someone who had been believed to be dangerous: 'You're not terrifying, you're boring!' I'm with that character, all the way. Yes, everyone's a critic, Ms. Atwood."

The sixth episode, "Unbowed, Unbent, Unbroken", was heavily criticized due to the showrunners' decision to have a well-liked character suffer a sexual assault. It received a rating of 54% on Rotten Tomatoes, lower than any previous episode of the show. The eighth episode, "Hardhome", received significant praise and was immediately regarded as one of the best episodes in the series. According to Business Insider, "Despite the attacks, Game of Thrones remains a steady hit."

Season 5 featured more significant changes from the novels. Some of the changes were more well-received than others (the sexual assault scene was heavily criticized and caused great controversy). The various plotlines for the season also differed significantly in reception. The Dornish subplot received an overwhelmingly negative reception. In particular, the hyped Sand Snakes were maligned by critics and fans alike, as many found them cheesy and unlikeable. In contrast, Tyrion's storyline was highly praised. Many fans felt that his subplot progressed overly slowly in the novels, and his meeting with Daenerys was particularly lauded.

=== Ratings ===
The gross viewing figure per episode for the show, which include streaming, DVR recordings and repeat showings, averaged at 20 million this season.

Viewership and ratings per episode of Game of Thrones season 5
No.	Title	Air date	Rating (18–49)	Viewers (millions)	DVR (18–49)	DVR viewers (millions)	Total (18–49)	Total viewers (millions)
1	"The Wars to Come"	April 12, 2015	4.2	8.00	1.0	2.07	5.2	10.07^{1}
2	"The House of Black and White"	April 19, 2015	3.6	6.81	1.2	2.0	4.8	8.81
3	"High Sparrow"	April 26, 2015	3.5	6.71	1.2	2.42	4.7	9.14
4	"Sons of the Harpy"	May 3, 2015	3.6	6.82	0.9	1.73	4.5	8.55^{1}
5	"Kill the Boy"	May 10, 2015	3.5	6.56	1.5	2.79	5.0	9.35
6	"Unbowed, Unbent, Unbroken"	May 17, 2015	3.1	6.24	1.4	2.55	4.5	8.79
7	"The Gift"	May 24, 2015	2.5	5.40	2.0	3.47	4.5	8.87
8	"Hardhome"	May 31, 2015	3.4	7.01	1.7	2.93	5.1	9.94
9	"The Dance of Dragons"	June 7, 2015	3.6	7.14	1.6	2.79	5.2	9.92
10	"Mother's Mercy"	June 14, 2015	4.1	8.11	1.3	2.31	5.4	10.43

^1 Live +7 ratings were not available, so Live +3 ratings have been used instead.

Business Insider noted a significant difference in the ratings between this season and previous seasons. The typical pattern involves "Solid premiere viewings followed by a slow but steady gain of momentum through to the finale. Historically, the finale episodes of each season have beaten the premiere for total number of viewers". However, this season showed a significant decline from 8 million viewers at the premiere to 5.4 million at the seventh episode, "The Gift". Business Insider cites two likely reasons for the lower ratings: backlash over the rape scene in "Unbowed, Unbent, Unbroken", one of many deviations from the novels throughout the season that "have upset fans," and increased online streaming through HBO Now. It also acknowledged a possible effect of the first four episodes leaking online before the season premiere and the decision to air on Memorial Day weekend in the United States (a weekend that had been skipped in previous seasons). Business Insider reached out to HBO for comment, HBO responded that it is seeing an increase in overall viewer numbers this season taking into account streaming services, which are not included in Nielsen ratings. The dip in ratings did not extend to the eighth and ninth episodes, "Hardhome," and "The Dance of Dragons", which were both seen by over 7 million viewers. The season finale, "Mother's Mercy" was seen by 8.11 million people, setting a new record and making it the most watched episode of the series.

=== Accolades ===
For the 5th Critics' Choice Television Awards, the series was nominated for Best Drama Series. For the 31st TCA Awards, the series was nominated for Program of the Year and Outstanding Achievement in Drama. For the 67th Primetime Emmy Awards, the series received 24 nominations, the most of any series. It won 12 awards, including Outstanding Drama Series, Peter Dinklage for Outstanding Supporting Actor in a Drama Series, Benioff and Weiss for Outstanding Writing for a Drama Series for "Mother's Mercy", and David Nutter for Outstanding Directing for a Drama Series for "Mother's Mercy". Nominations included Lena Headey and Emilia Clarke both for Outstanding Supporting Actress in a Drama Series, Diana Rigg for Outstanding Guest Actress in a Drama Series, and Jeremy Podeswa for Outstanding Directing for a Drama Series for "Unbowed, Unbent, Unbroken".

Year	Award	Category	Nominee(s)	Result	Ref.
2015	AFI Awards	AFI TV Award	Game of Thrones	Won	
2015	5th Critics' Choice Television Awards	Best Drama Series	Game of Thrones	Nominated	
2015	5th Critics' Choice Television Awards	Most Bingeworthy Show	Game of Thrones	Nominated	
2015	31st TCA Awards	Outstanding Achievement in Drama	Game of Thrones	Nominated	
2015	31st TCA Awards	Program of the Year	Game of Thrones	Nominated	
2015	Gold Derby TV Awards 2015	Best Drama Series	Game of Thrones	Won	
2015	Gold Derby TV Awards 2015	Best Drama Supporting Actor	Peter Dinklage	Won	
2015	Gold Derby TV Awards 2015	Best Drama Supporting Actress	Lena Headey	Won	
2015	Gold Derby TV Awards 2015	Best Drama Guest Actress	Diana Rigg	Won	
2015	Gold Derby TV Awards 2015	Best Drama Episode	"Hardhome"	Nominated	
2015	Gold Derby TV Awards 2015	Best Drama Episode	"Mother's Mercy"	Won	
2015	Gold Derby TV Awards 2015	Ensemble of the Year	The cast of Game of Thrones	Won	
2015	Artios Awards	Outstanding Achievement in Casting – Television Series Drama	Nina Gold	Won	
2015	EWwy Award	Best Supporting Actress, Drama	Maisie Williams	Nominated	
2015	EWwy Award	Best Supporting Actress, Drama	Sophie Turner	Nominated	
2015	67th Primetime Emmy Awards	Outstanding Directing for a Drama Series	David Nutter for "Mother's Mercy"	Won	
2015	67th Primetime Emmy Awards	Outstanding Directing for a Drama Series	Jeremy Podeswa for "Unbowed, Unbent, Unbroken"	Nominated	
2015	67th Primetime Emmy Awards	Outstanding Writing for a Drama Series	David Benioff and D. B. Weiss for "Mother's Mercy"	Won	
2015	67th Primetime Emmy Awards	Outstanding Drama Series	Game of Thrones	Won	
2015	67th Primetime Emmy Awards	Outstanding Supporting Actor in a Drama Series	Peter Dinklage as Tyrion Lannister	Won	
2015	67th Primetime Emmy Awards	Outstanding Supporting Actress in a Drama Series	Emilia Clarke as Daenerys Targaryen	Nominated	
2015	67th Primetime Emmy Awards	Outstanding Supporting Actress in a Drama Series	Lena Headey as Cersei Lannister	Nominated	
2015	67th Primetime Creative Arts Emmy Awards	Outstanding Casting for a Drama Series	Nina Gold, Robert Sterne, and Carla Stronge	Won	
2015	67th Primetime Creative Arts Emmy Awards	Outstanding Cinematography for a Single-Camera Series	Fabian Wagner for "Hardhome"	Nominated	
2015	67th Primetime Creative Arts Emmy Awards	Outstanding Cinematography for a Single-Camera Series	Anette Haellmigk for "Sons of the Harpy"	Nominated	
2015	67th Primetime Creative Arts Emmy Awards	Outstanding Cinematography for a Single-Camera Series	Rob McLachlan for "The Dance of Dragons"	Nominated	
2015	67th Primetime Creative Arts Emmy Awards	Outstanding Cinematography for a Single-Camera Series	Gregory Middleton for "Unbowed, Unbent, Unbroken"	Nominated	
2015	67th Primetime Creative Arts Emmy Awards	Outstanding Costumes for a Fantasy Series	Michele Clapton, Sheena Wichary, Nina Ayres, Alex Fordham for "The Dance of Dragons"	Nominated	
2015	67th Primetime Creative Arts Emmy Awards	Outstanding Guest Actress in a Drama Series	Diana Rigg as Lady Olenna Tyrell	Nominated	
2015	67th Primetime Creative Arts Emmy Awards	Outstanding Hairstyling for a Single-Camera Series	Kevin Alexander, Candice Banks, Rosalia Culora, Gary Machin, Laura Pollock, Nicola Mount for Mother's Mercy	Nominated	
2015	67th Primetime Creative Arts Emmy Awards	Outstanding Make-up for a Single-Camera Series (Non-Prosthetic)	Jane Walker and Nicola Matthews for "Mother's Mercy"	Won	
2015	67th Primetime Creative Arts Emmy Awards	Outstanding Production Design for a Fantasy Program	Deborah Riley, Paul Ghirardani, Rob Cameron for "High Sparrow", "Unbowed, Unbent, Unbroken", and "Hardhome"	Won	
2015	67th Primetime Creative Arts Emmy Awards	Outstanding Prosthetic Makeup for a Series	Jane Walker, Barrie Gower, and Sarah Gower for "Hardhome"	Nominated	
2015	67th Primetime Creative Arts Emmy Awards	Outstanding Single-Camera Picture Editing for a Drama series	Tim Porter for "Hardhome"	Nominated	
2015	67th Primetime Creative Arts Emmy Awards	Outstanding Single-Camera Picture Editing for a Drama series	Katie Weiland for "The Dance of Dragons"	Won	
2015	67th Primetime Creative Arts Emmy Awards	Outstanding Sound Editing for a Series	Tim Kimmel, Paula Fairfield, Bradley C. Katona, Peter Bercovitch, David Klotz, Jeffrey Wilhoit, Dylan T. Wilhoit for "Hardhome"	Won	
2015	67th Primetime Creative Arts Emmy Awards	Outstanding Sound Mixing for a Series	Ronan Hill, Richard Dyer, Onnalee Blank, Mathew Waters for "Hardhome"	Won	
2015	67th Primetime Creative Arts Emmy Awards	Outstanding Special Visual Effects	Steve Kullback, Joe Bauer, Adam Chazen, Jabbar Raisani, Eric Carney, Stuart Brisdon, Derek Spears, James Kinnings, Matthew Rouleau for "The Dance of Dragons"	Won	
2015	67th Primetime Creative Arts Emmy Awards	Outstanding Stunt Coordination for a Series	Rowley Irlam	Won	
2015	E! Online Best. Ever. TV. Awards	Outstanding Drama Series	Game of Thrones	Nominated	
2015	Hollywood Post Alliance	Outstanding Sound	Tim Kimmel, Paula Fairfield, Bradley Katona, Paul Bercovitch, Onnalee Blank, Mathew Waters for "Hardhome"	Nominated	
2015	Hollywood Post Alliance	Outstanding Color Grading	Joe Finley for "Hardhome"	Nominated	
2015	Hollywood Post Alliance	Outstanding Editing	Tim Porter for "Hardhome"	Nominated	
2015	Hollywood Post Alliance	Outstanding Visual Effects	Joe Bauer, Steve Kullback, Derek Spears, Eric Carney, Jabbar Raisani for "The Dance of Dragons"	Won	
2015	British Society of Cinematographers	Best Cinematography in a Television Drama	Fabian Wagner for "Hardhome"	Nominated	
2015	British Society of Cinematographers	ACO/BSC/GBCT Operators TV Drama Award	David Morgan, Sean Savage, Ben Wilson, David Worley for "Hardhome"	Won	
2015	Australian Production Design Guild	Production Design for a Television Drama	Deborah Riley	Won	
2015	20th Satellite Awards	Best Supporting Actor – Series, Miniseries or Television Film	Peter Dinklage	Nominated	
2015	20th Satellite Awards	Best Television Series – Genre	Game of Thrones	Nominated	
2015	IGN Awards	Best TV Series	Game of Thrones	Nominated	
2015	IGN Awards	Best TV Episode	"Hardhome"	Won	
2015	IGN Awards	Best TV Drama Series	Game of Thrones	Nominated	
2015	IGN Awards	Best TV Villain	Iwan Rheon as Ramsay Bolton	Nominated	
2015	IGN People's Choice Awards	Best TV Series	Game of Thrones	Nominated	
2015	IGN People's Choice Awards	Best TV Episode	"Hardhome"	Nominated	
2015	IGN People's Choice Awards	Best TV Drama Series	Game of Thrones	Nominated	
2015	IGN People's Choice Awards	Best TV Villain	Iwan Rheon as Ramsay Bolton	Nominated	
2016	Guinness World Records	Largest TV drama simulcast	Game of Thrones	Won	
2016	Guinness World Records	Most viewers sharing a single torrent file simultaneously	Game of Thrones	Won	
2016	42nd People's Choice Awards	Favorite TV Show	Game of Thrones	Nominated	
2016	42nd People's Choice Awards	Favorite Cable Sci-Fi/Fantasy TV Show	Game of Thrones	Nominated	
2016	42nd People's Choice Awards	Favorite Cable Sci-Fi/Fantasy TV Actress	Emilia Clarke	Nominated	
2016	Shorty Awards	Favorite TV Show	Game of Thrones	Nominated	
2016	Shorty Awards	GIF of the Year	Game of Thrones Come At Me Bro	Nominated	
2016	Empire Awards	Best TV Series	Game of Thrones	Nominated	
2016	Art Directors Guild Awards 2015	One-Hour Single Camera Fantasy Television Series	Deborah Riley for "High Sparrow", "Unbowed, Unbent, Unbroken" and "Hardhome"	Won	
2016	Screenwriters Choice Awards	Best Television Drama	Game of Thrones	Won	
2016	Hollywood Makeup Artist and Hair Stylist Guild Awards	Best Period and/or Character Makeup – Television	Jane Walker	Won	
2016	Hollywood Makeup Artist and Hair Stylist Guild Awards	Best Period and/or Character Hair Styling – Television	Kevin Alexander, Candice Banks	Won	
2016	Webby Award	Best Overall Social Presence	Game of Thrones	Won	
2016	Location Managers Guild Awards	Outstanding Locations in Period Television	Robert Boake and Tate Araez	Won	
2016	Cinema Audio Society Awards	Outstanding Achievement in Sound Mixing - Television Series – One Hour	Ronan Hill, Richard Dyer, Onnalee Blank, Mathew Waters, Brett Voss for "Hardhome"	Won	
2016	American Cinema Editors Awards 2016	Best Edited One-Hour Series For Non-Commercial Television	Katie Weiland for "The Dance of Dragons"	Nominated	
2016	American Cinema Editors Awards 2016	Best Edited One-Hour Series For Non-Commercial Television	Tim Porter for "Hardhome"	Nominated	
2016	Costume Designers Guild Awards	Outstanding Period/Fantasy Television Series	Michele Clapton for Game of Thrones	Won	
2016	68th Directors Guild of America Awards	Dramatic Series	David Nutter for "Mother’s Mercy"	Won	
2016	American Society of Cinematographers	Outstanding Achievement in Cinematography in Regular Series	Fabian Wagner for "Hardhome"	Nominated	
2016	73rd Golden Globe Awards	Best Television Series – Drama	Game of Thrones	Nominated	
2016	13th Irish Film & Television Awards	Best Television Drama	Game of Thrones	Nominated	
2016	13th Irish Film & Television Awards	Actor in a Supporting Role – Television	Liam Cunningham	Nominated	
2016	MTV Millennial Awards	Killer Series of the Year	Game of Thrones	Won	
2016	21st National Television Awards	Best International Show	Game of Thrones	Nominated	
2016	Producers Guild of America Awards 2015	"Norman Felton Award for Outstanding Producer of Episodic Television, Drama"	David Benioff, D. B. Weiss, Bernadette Caulfield, Frank Doelger, Carolyn Strauss, Bryan Cogman, Lisa McAtackney, Chris Newman, Greg Spence	Won	
2016	42nd Saturn Awards	Best Fantasy Television Series	Game of Thrones	Nominated	
2016	42nd Saturn Awards	Best Supporting Actor on Television	Kit Harington	Nominated	
2016	42nd Saturn Awards	Best Supporting Actress on Television	Lena Headey	Nominated	
2016	42nd Saturn Awards	Best Performance by a Younger Actor in a Television Series	Maisie Williams	Nominated	
2016	42nd Saturn Awards	Best Performance by a Younger Actor in a Television Series	Brenock O'Connor	Nominated	
2016	22nd Screen Actors Guild Awards	Outstanding Action Performance by a Stunt Ensemble in a Drama Series	Boian Anev, Richard Bradshaw, Jonathan Cohen, Christopher Cox, Jacob Cox, Matt Crook, Rob DeGroot, Levan Doran, Clint Elvy, James Embree, Bradley Farmer, Richard Hansen, Bobby Holland-Hanton, Radoslav Ignatov, Borislav Iliev, Rowley Irlam, Erol Ismail, Milen Kaleychev, Paul Lowe, Jonathan McBride, Sian Milne, David Newton, Radoslav Parvanov, Ian Pead, Jan Petrina, Rashid Phoenix, Andy Pilgrim, Dominic Preece, Marc Redmond, Paul Shapcott, Ryan Stuart, Pablo Verdejo, Calvin Warrington-Heasman, Annabel E. Wood, Danko Yordanov, and Lewis Young	Won	
2016	22nd Screen Actors Guild Awards	Outstanding Performance by An Ensemble in a Drama Series	Alfie Allen, Ian Beattie, John Bradley, Gwendoline Christie, Emilia Clarke, Michael Condron, Nikolaj Coster-Waldau, Ben Crompton, Liam Cunningham, Stephen Dillane, Peter Dinklage, Nathalie Emmanuel, Tara Fitzgerald, Jerome Flynn, Brian Fortune, Joel Fry, Aidan Gillen, Iain Glen, Kit Harington, Lena Headey, Michiel Huisman, Brenock O'Conner, Daniel Portman, Iwan Rheon, Owen Teale, Sophie Turner, Carice Van Houten, Maisie Williams and Tom Wlaschiha	Nominated	
2016	22nd Screen Actors Guild Awards	Outstanding Performance by a Male Actor in a Drama Series	Peter Dinklage	Nominated	
2016	Glamour Awards 2016	Best UK TV Actress	Sophie Turner	Won	
2016	Golden Reel Awards	Best Sound Editing in Television, Short Form: FX/Foley	Tim Kimmel for "Hardhome"	Won	
2016	Golden Reel Awards	Best Sound Editing in Television, Short Form: Dialogue / ADR	Tim Kimmel for "Hardhome"	Won	
2016	Golden Reel Awards	Best Sound Editing in Television, Short Form: Music	David Klotz for "Hardhome"	Nominated	
2016	USC Scripter Award	Best Adapted Screenplay	David Benioff and D. B. Weiss for "Hardhome"	Nominated	
2016	Visual Effects Society Awards 2015	Outstanding Visual Effects in a Photoreal Episode	Joe Bauer, Steve Kullback, Eric Carney, Derek Spears, Stuart Brisdon for "The Dance of Dragons"	Won	
2016	Visual Effects Society Awards 2015	Outstanding Animated Performance in an Episode, Commercial, or Real-Time Project	Florian Friedmann, Jonathan Symmonds, Sven Skoczylas, Sebastian Lauer' for "Mother's Mercy" - Wounded Drogon	Nominated	
2016	Visual Effects Society Awards 2015	Outstanding Animated Performance in an Episode, Commercial, or Real-Time Project	James Kinnings, Michael Holzl, Joseph Hoback, Matt Derksen for "Dance of Dragons" - Drogon Arena Rescue	Nominated	
2016	Visual Effects Society Awards 2015	Outstanding Created Environment in an Episode, Commercial, or Real-Time Project	Dominic Piche, Christine Leclerc, Patrice Poissant, Thomas Montminy-Brodeur for "City of Volantis"	Won	
2016	Visual Effects Society Awards 2015	Outstanding Created Environment in an Episode, Commercial, or Real-Time Project	Rajeev B R., Loganathan Perumal, Ramesh Shankers, Anders Ericson for "Drogon Arena"	Nominated	
2016	Visual Effects Society Awards 2015	Outstanding Effects Simulations in an Episode, Commercial, or Real-Time Project	David Ramos, Antonio Lado, Piotr Weiss, Félix Bergés for "Hardhome"	Won	
2016	Visual Effects Society Awards 2015	Outstanding Compositing in a Photoreal Episode	Eduardo Díaz, Guillermo Orbe, Oscar Perea, Inmaculada Nadela for "Hardhome"	Won	
2016	Visual Effects Society Awards 2015	Outstanding Compositing in a Photoreal Episode	Dan Breckwoldt, Martin Furman, Sophie Marfleet, Eric Andrusyszyn for "Drogon Arena"	Nominated	
2016	Visual Effects Society Awards 2015	Outstanding Compositing in a Photoreal Episode	Travis Nobles, Mark Spindler, Max Riess, Nadja Ding for "Drogon Lair"	Nominated	
2016	Writers Guild of America Awards 2015	Episodic Drama	David Benioff and D. B. Weiss for "Mother's Mercy"	Nominated	
2016	Writers Guild of America Awards 2015	Television Drama Series	David Benioff, Bryan Cogman, Dave Hill, D. B. Weiss	Nominated	
2016	Canadian Society of Cinematographers	TV series Cinematography	Robert McLachlan for "The Dance of Dragons"	Won	
2016	Canadian Society of Cinematographers	TV series Cinematography	Gregory Middleton for "Unbowed, Unbent, Unbroken"	Nominated	

== Release ==
=== Broadcast ===
The season was simulcast to 170 countries by HBO and its broadcast partners. In some countries, it aired the day after its first release. Sky Atlantic, the network serving the United Kingdom and Ireland, aired the premiere the day after HBO, but joined the simulcast for the rest of the season.

=== Marketing ===
A half-hour documentary, Game of Thrones: A Day in the Life, aired on HBO on February 8, 2015. It covered one day of production of season 5 on three sets in Belfast, Dubrovnik and Osuna from the viewpoint of key crew members. The first official trailer for season 5 was released on January 30, 2015, and the season's second trailer was released on March 9, 2015. The world premiere of the first episode of the fifth season was held at the Tower of London on March 18, 2015.

=== Home media ===
The season was released on Blu-ray and DVD on March 15, 2016, in region 1 and March 14, 2016, in region 2.

Game of Thrones: The Complete Fifth Season
Set details	Special features	
Format: AC-3, Blu-ray, DTS Surround Sound, Dubbed, NTSC, Subtitled, Widescreen; Language: English, French, Castilian, German; Subtitles: English, French, Castilian, German, Dutch, Danish, Finnish, Greek, Hebrew, Norwegian, Portuguese, Romanian, Swedish, Turkish; 16:9 aspect ratio; 5-disc set, 10 episodes	"New Characters and Locations": Explores the new societies, cultures and locations of Season 5.; "Anatomy of an Episode: Mother's Mercy": Behind the scenes of the season finale. From the early stages of the writer's room to the final visual effects.; "The Real History Behind Game of Thrones Parts 1 and 2": Watch historians, along with George R. R. Martin, explore the interweaving inspirations of the actual players in the era known as "The Wars of the Roses" and other historical events in this two-part series.; "A Day in the Life": Takes you behind-the-scenes of production in three countries, offering an inside look at the production process of Season 5.; Deleted Scenes: Four deleted scenes.; 12 audio commentaries by, among others, Benioff, Weiss, Dinklage, Headey, Harington, Coster-Waldau, Glen, Williams, Dormer, Christie and more.; Blu-ray exclusive: "The Dance of Dragons": Tells the story of the Greens and the Blacks, the Targaryen civil war that led to the downfall of the dragons, featuring surprise narration from notable characters from past seasons.; "In-Episode Guide": In-feature resource that provides background information about on-screen characters, locations and relevant histories.; "Histories & Lore": Learn about the mythology of Westeros as told from the varying perspectives of the characters themselves.	
DVD release dates
Region 1	Region 2	Region 4
March 15, 2016	March 14, 2016	March 16, 2016

=== Illegal distribution ===
On April 11, prior to the airing of the season's first episode, screener copies of the first four episodes were leaked to several file sharing sites. According to TorrentFreak, 18 million different IP addresses downloaded the leaked episodes, totaling 32 million downloads during the first week. The fifth season of Game of Thrones was the most-pirated TV series in 2015.
