= 67th Primetime Creative Arts Emmy Awards =

2015 American television programming awards

- Date: September 12, 2015
- Location: Microsoft Theater; Los Angeles, California
- Presented by: Academy of Television Arts & Sciences
- Most awards: Game of Thrones (8)
- Most nominations: Game of Thrones (17)

Television/radio coverage
- Network: FXX

The 67th Annual Primetime Creative Arts Emmy Awards ceremony was held on September 12, 2015, at the Microsoft Theater in Downtown Los Angeles. The event was broadcast in the U.S. by FXX on September 19, 2015. The ceremony was in conjunction with the annual Primetime Emmy Awards and is presented in recognition of creative, technical, visual, and other similar achievements in American television programming, including voice-over and guest acting roles.

For the first time, online voting was used to determine the winners. Online voting was also used to determine the nominees, which were announced on July 16, 2015. Juried award winners for animation, costumes for a variety series, motion design, and interactive awards were announced on September 10, 2015.

== Winners and nominees ==
Winners are listed first and highlighted in bold:

=== Governor's Award ===
- **A&E Networks**

=== Programs ===
Programs
**Outstanding Structured Reality Program**: **Shark Tank (ABC)**; Antiques Roadshow (PBS); Diners, Drive-Ins and Dives (Food Network); MythBusters (Discovery Channel); Property Brothers (HGTV); Undercover Boss (CBS)	**Outstanding Unstructured Reality Program**: **Deadliest Catch (Discovery Channel)**; Alaska: The Last Frontier (Discovery Channel); Intervention (A&E); Million Dollar Listing New York (Bravo); Naked and Afraid (Discovery Channel); Wahlburgers (A&E)
**Outstanding Television Movie**: **Bessie (HBO)**; Agatha Christie's Poirot: Curtain: Poirot's Last Case (PBS); Grace of Monaco (Lifetime); Hello Ladies: The Movie (HBO); Killing Jesus (Nat Geo); Nightingale (HBO)	**Outstanding Variety Special**: **The Saturday Night Live 40th Anniversary Special (NBC)**; Bill Maher: Live from D.C. (HBO); The Kennedy Center Honors (CBS); Louis C.K.: Live at the Comedy Store (LouisCK.net); Mel Brooks: Live at the Geffen (HBO); Tony Bennett and Lady Gaga: Cheek to Cheek Live! (PBS)
**Outstanding Informational Series or Special**: **Anthony Bourdain: Parts Unknown (CNN)**; Foo Fighters: Sonic Highways (HBO); Inside the Actors Studio (Bravo); StarTalk with Neil deGrasse Tyson (Nat Geo); Vice (HBO)	**Outstanding Documentary or Nonfiction Series**: **The Jinx: The Life and Deaths of Robert Durst (HBO)**; American Masters (PBS); Cancer: The Emperor of All Maladies (PBS); The Roosevelts: An Intimate History (PBS); The Sixties (CNN)
**Outstanding Documentary or Nonfiction Special**: **Going Clear: Scientology and the Prison of Belief (HBO)**; The Case Against 8 (HBO); Kurt Cobain: Montage of Heck (HBO); Sinatra: All or Nothing at All (HBO); Virunga (Netflix)	**Outstanding Animated Program**: **Over the Garden Wall (Cartoon Network)**; Archer (Episode: "Pocket Listing") (FX); Bob's Burgers (Episode: "Can't Buy Me Math") (Fox); The Simpsons (Episode: "Treehouse of Horror XXV") (Fox); South Park (Episode: "Freemium Isn't Free") (Comedy Central)
**Outstanding Short-Format Animated Program**: **Adventure Time (Episode: "Jake the Brick") (Cartoon Network)**; Mickey Mouse (Episode: "Mumbai Madness") (Disney Channel); Regular Show (Episode: "White Elephant Gift Exchange") (Cartoon Network); Robot Chicken (Episode: "Chipotle Miserable") (Adult Swim); Steven Universe (Episode: "Lion 3: Straight to Video") (Cartoon Network); Wander Over Yonder (Episode: "The Gift 2: The Giftening") (Disney XD)	**Outstanding Children's Program**: **Alan Alda and the Actor Within You: A YoungArts Masterclass (HBO)**; Degrassi (Nickelodeon); Dog with a Blog (Disney Channel); Girl Meets World (Disney Channel); Nick News with Linda Ellerbee: Coming Out (Nickelodeon)
**Outstanding Special Class Program**: **Live from Lincoln Center – Sweeney Todd: The Demon Barber of Fleet Street in Concert with the New York Philharmonic (PBS)**; 68th Tony Awards (CBS); 72nd Golden Globe Awards (NBC); 87th Academy Awards (ABC); On the Run Tour: Beyoncé and Jay-Z (HBO)	**Outstanding Short-Format Live-Action Entertainment Program**: **Between Two Ferns with Zach Galifianakis (Episode: "Brad Pitt") (funnyordie.com)**; Billy on the Street (Episode: "With First Lady Michelle Obama, Big Bird, and Elena!!!") (funnyordie.com); Childrens Hospital (Episode: "Just Like Cyrano de Bergerac") (Adult Swim); Key & Peele Presents Van and Mike: The Ascension (Episode: "Episode 5") (comedycentral.com); Super Bowl XLIX Halftime Show starring Katy Perry (NBC)
**Outstanding Short-Format Nonfiction Program**: **A Tribute to Mel Brooks (FX Networks)**; 30 for 30 Shorts (ESPN); American Horror Story: Extra-Ordinary Artists (FX Networks); Parks and Recreation: Behind the Final Season (NBC); Transparent: This Is Me (ew.com)	**Exceptional Merit in Documentary Filmmaking**: **Citizenfour (HBO)**; The Great Invisible (PBS); Hot Girls Wanted (Netflix)
**Outstanding Interactive Program**: **Last Week Tonight with John Oliver (HBO)**; @midnight with Chris Hardwick (Comedy Central); Saturday Night Live: SNL 40 (NBC); Talking Dead (AMC); The Tonight Show Starring Jimmy Fallon (NBC)

=== Acting ===
Acting
**Outstanding Guest Actor in a Comedy Series**: **Bradley Whitford as Marcy May on Transparent (Episode: "Best New Girl") (Amazon)**; Mel Brooks as Himself on The Comedians (Episode: "Celebrity Guest") (FX); Louis C.K. as Various Characters on Saturday Night Live (Episode: "Host: Louis C.K.") (NBC); Paul Giamatti as Juror #10 on Inside Amy Schumer (Episode: "12 Angry Men Inside Amy Schumer") (Comedy Central); Bill Hader as Various Characters on Saturday Night Live (Episode: "Host: Bill Hader") (NBC); Jon Hamm as Reverend Richard Wayne Gary Wayne on Unbreakable Kimmy Schmidt (Episode: "Kimmy Makes Waffles!") (Netflix)	**Outstanding Guest Actress in a Comedy Series**: **Joan Cusack as Sheila Jackson on Shameless (Episode: "Milk of the Gods") (Showtime)**; Pamela Adlon as Pamela on Louie (Episode: "Bobby's House") (FX); Elizabeth Banks as Sal on Modern Family (Episode: "Fight or Flight") (ABC); Christine Baranski as Dr. Beverly Hofstadter on The Big Bang Theory (Episode: "The Maternal Combustion") (CBS); Tina Fey as Marcia Clark on Unbreakable Kimmy Schmidt (Episode: "Kimmy Goes to Court!") (Netflix); Gaby Hoffmann as Caroline Sackler on Girls (Episode: "Home Birth") (HBO)
**Outstanding Guest Actor in a Drama Series**: **Reg E. Cathey as Freddy Hayes on House of Cards (Episode: "Chapter 34") (Netflix)**; F. Murray Abraham as Dar Adal on Homeland (Episode: "Long Time Coming") (Showtime); Alan Alda as Alan Fitch on The Blacklist (Episode: "The Decembrist") (NBC); Beau Bridges as Provost Barton Scully on Masters of Sex (Episode: "Parallax") (Showtime); Michael J. Fox as Louis Canning on The Good Wife (Episode: "Red Zone") (CBS); Pablo Schreiber as George "Pornstache" Mendez on Orange Is the New Black (Episode: "40 Oz. of Furlough") (Netflix)	**Outstanding Guest Actress in a Drama Series**: **Margo Martindale as Claudia on The Americans (Episode: "I Am Abassin Zadran") (FX)**; Khandi Alexander as Maya Lewis on Scandal (Episode: "Where the Sun Don't Shine") (ABC); Rachel Brosnahan as Rachel Posner on House of Cards (Episode: "Chapter 39") (Netflix); Allison Janney as Margaret Scully on Masters of Sex (Episode: "Parallax") (Showtime); Diana Rigg as Lady Olenna Tyrell on Game of Thrones (Episode: "The Gift") (HBO); Cicely Tyson as Ophelia Harkness on How to Get Away With Murder (Episode: "Mama's Here Now") (ABC)
**Outstanding Character Voice-Over Performance**: **Hank Azaria as Moe Szyslak and Pedicab Driver on The Simpsons (Episode: "The Princess Guide") (Fox)**; Dan Castellaneta as Homer Simpson on The Simpsons (Episode: "Bart's New Friend") (Fox); Seth Green as Various Characters on Robot Chicken (Episode: "Victoria's Secret of Nimph") (Cartoon Network); Seth MacFarlane as Peter Griffin, Stewie Griffin, Brian Griffin, and Dr. Elmer Hartman on Family Guy (Episode: "Our Idiot Brian") (Fox); Tress MacNeille as Laney Fontaine, Shauna, and Mrs. Muntz on The Simpsons (Episode: "My Fare Lady") (Fox); John Roberts as Linda Belcher and Tim on Bob's Burgers (Episode: "Eat, Spray, Linda") (Fox)	**Outstanding Narrator**: **Peter Coyote on The Roosevelts: An Intimate History (Episode: "Episode 1: Get Action (1858–1901)") (PBS)**; Neil deGrasse Tyson on Hubble's Cosmic Journey (Nat Geo); Anthony Mendez on Jane the Virgin (Episode: "Chapter Fourteen") (The CW); Miranda Richardson on Operation Orangutan (Nat Geo); Henry Strozier on Too Cute! (Episode: "Tubby Puppies") (Animal Planet)

=== Animation ===
Animation
**Outstanding Individual Achievement in Animation (Juried)**
- **Adventure Time – Tom Herpich (storyboard artist) (Episode: "Walnuts & Rain") (Cartoon Network)**
- **Gravity Falls – Alonso Ramirez Ramos (storyboard artist) (Episode: "Not What He Seems") (Disney XD)**
- **King Star King – J.J. Villard (character design) (Episode: "Fat Frank's Fantasy Lounge") (Adult Swim)**
- **Over the Garden Wall – Nick Cross (production design) (Cartoon Network)**
- **Robot Chicken – Bradley Schaffer (character animation) (Episode: "Robot Chicken's Bitch Pudding Special") (Adult Swim)**
- **Tome of the Unknown – Nick Cross (background painter) (CartoonNetwork.com)**
- **Tome of the Unknown – Chris Tsirgiotis (background layout designer) (CartoonNetwork.com)**

=== Casting ===
Casting
**Outstanding Casting for a Comedy Series**: **Veep - Allison Jones, Meredith Tucker, and Pat Moran (HBO)**; Louie - Gayle Keller (FX); Modern Family - Jeff Greenberg (ABC); Transparent - Eyde Belasco (Amazon); Unbreakable Kimmy Schmidt - Jennifer Euston and Meredith Tucker (Netflix)	**Outstanding Casting for a Drama Series**: **Game of Thrones - Nina Gold and Robert Sterne (HBO)**; Downton Abbey - Jill Trevellick (PBS); House of Cards - Laray Mayfield and Julie Schubert (Netflix); Mad Men - Laura Schiff and Carrie Audino (AMC); Orange Is the New Black - Jennifer Euston (Netflix)
**Outstanding Casting for a Limited Series, Movie, or Special**: **Olive Kitteridge - Laura Rosenthal and Carolyn Pickman (HBO)**; American Crime - Kim Coleman and Beth Sepko Lindsey (ABC); American Horror Story: Freak Show - Robert J. Ulrich, Eric Dawson, and Meagan Lewis (FX); Bessie - Billy Hopkins and Jackie Burch (HBO); Wolf Hall - Nina Gold and Robert Sterne (PBS)

=== Choreography ===
Choreography
**Outstanding Choreography**
- **Derek Hough, Julianne Hough, and Tessandra Chavez for Dancing with the Stars (Routine: "Elastic Heart") (ABC)**
- **Travis Wall for So You Think You Can Dance (Routines: "Wave" / "When I Go" / "Wind Beneath My Wings") (Fox)**
  - Witney Carson for Dancing with the Stars (Routines: "369" / "It's Not Unusual" / "Sing with a Swing-Apache") (ABC)
  - Spencer Liff for So You Think You Can Dance (Routines: "Hernando's Hideaway" / "World on a String" / "Maybe This Time") (Fox)
  - Sonya Tayeh for So You Think You Can Dance (Routines: "Vow" / "So Broken" / "Europe, After the Rain") (Fox)

=== Cinematography ===
Cinematography
**Outstanding Cinematography for a Multi-Camera Series**: **Mike & Molly – Gary Baum (Episode: "Checkpoint Joyce") (CBS)**; 2 Broke Girls – Christian La Fountaine (Episode: "And the Old Bike Yarn") (CBS); The Big Bang Theory – Steven V. Silver (Episode: "The Expedition Approximation") (CBS); The Millers – Gary Baum (Episode: "Con-Troversy") (CBS)	**Outstanding Cinematography for a Single-Camera Series**: **Boardwalk Empire – Jonathan Freeman (Episode: "Golden Days for Boys and Girls") (HBO)**; Game of Thrones – Anette Haellmigk (Episode: "Sons of the Harpy") (HBO); Game of Thrones – Rob McLachlan (Episode: "The Dance of Dragons") (HBO); Game of Thrones – Greg Middleton (Episode: "Unbowed, Unbent, Unbroken") (HBO); Game of Thrones – Fabian Wagner (Episode: "Hardhome") (HBO); The Good Wife – Fred Murphy (Episode: "The Line") (CBS); House of Cards – Martin Ahlgren (Episode: "Chapter 29") (Netflix)
**Outstanding Cinematography for a Limited Series or Movie**: **Bessie – Jeffrey Jur (HBO)**; American Horror Story: Freak Show – Michael Goi (Episode: "Monsters Among Us") (FX); Houdini – Karl Walter Lindenlaub (Episode: "Part 1") (History); The Secret Life of Marilyn Monroe – Chris Manley (Lifetime)	**Outstanding Cinematography for Nonfiction Programming**: **Virunga – Franklin Dow (Netflix)**; Citizenfour – Laura Poitras (HBO); Going Clear: Scientology and the Prison of Belief – Sam Painter (HBO); The Jinx: The Life and Deaths of Robert Durst – Marc Smerling (Episode: "Chapter 2: Poor Little Rich Boy") (HBO); Kurt Cobain: Montage of Heck – James Whitaker (HBO)
**Outstanding Cinematography for Reality Programming**: **Deadliest Catch (Episode: "A Brotherhood Tested") (Discovery Channel)**; The Amazing Race (CBS); Life Below Zero (Nat Geo); Project Runway (Lifetime); Survivor (CBS)

=== Commercial ===
Commercial
**Outstanding Commercial**
- **"#LikeAGirl" (Always)**
  - "Brady Bunch" (Snickers)
  - "Dream On" (Adobe)
  - "Lost Dog" (Budweiser)
  - "Made in NY" (Gatorade)
  - "With Dad" (Nissan)

=== Costumes ===
Costumes
**Outstanding Costumes for a Contemporary Series, Limited Series or Movie**: **Transparent (Episode: "Symbolic Exemplar") (Amazon)**; Empire (Episode: "The Lyon's Roar") (Fox); Empire (Episode: "Pilot") (Fox); Gotham (Episode: "Under The Knife") (Fox); The Mindy Project (Episode: "San Francisco Bae") (Fox); Olive Kitteridge (Episode: "Incoming Tide") (HBO)	**Outstanding Costumes for a Period/Fantasy Series, Limited Series or Movie**: **American Horror Story: Freak Show (Episode: "Monsters Among Us") (FX)**; Boardwalk Empire (Episode: "Golden Days for Boys and Girls") (HBO); Downton Abbey (Episode: "A Moorland Holiday") (PBS); Game of Thrones (Episode: "The Dance of Dragons") (HBO); Wolf Hall (Episode: "Anna Regina") (PBS)
**Outstanding Costumes for a Variety Program or a Special**: **Drunk History (Episode: "Hollywood") (Comedy Central)**; **Super Bowl XLIX Halftime Show starring Katy Perry (NBC)**

=== Directing ===
Directing
**Outstanding Directing for Nonfiction Programming**: **Alex Gibney for Going Clear: Scientology and the Prison of Belief (HBO)**; Dave Grohl for Foo Fighters: Sonic Highways (Episode: "Washington D.C.") (HBO); Andrew Jarecki for The Jinx: The Life and Deaths of Robert Durst (Episode: "Chapter 2: Poor Little Rich Boy") (HBO); Brett Morgen for Kurt Cobain: Montage of Heck (HBO); Laura Poitras for Citizenfour (HBO)	**Outstanding Directing for a Variety Special**: **Don Roy King for The Saturday Night Live 40th Anniversary Special (NBC)**; Hamish Hamilton for 87th Academy Awards (ABC); Louis J. Horvitz for The Kennedy Center Honors (CBS); Natalie Johns for Annie Lennox: Nostalgia Live in Concert (PBS); Glenn Weiss for 68th Tony Awards (CBS)

=== Hairstyling ===
Hairstyling
**Outstanding Hairstyling for a Single-Camera Series**: **Downton Abbey (Episode: "Episode Six") (PBS)**; Boardwalk Empire (Episode: "Eldorado") (HBO); Game of Thrones (Episode: "Mother's Mercy") (HBO); The Knick (Episode: "Get the Rope") (Cinemax); Mad Men (Episode: "Person to Person") (AMC)	**Outstanding Hairstyling for a Multi-Camera Series or Special**: **Saturday Night Live (Episode: "Host: Martin Freeman") (NBC)**; Dancing with the Stars (Episode: "Episode 1907") (ABC); Key & Peele (Episode: "Aerobics Meltdown") (Comedy Central); So You Think You Can Dance (Episode: "Episode 1115") (Fox); The Voice (Episode: "Episode 818B") (NBC)
**Outstanding Hairstyling for a Limited Series or Movie**: **American Horror Story: Freak Show (FX)**; Bessie (HBO); Grace of Monaco (Lifetime); Olive Kitteridge (HBO); The Secret Life of Marilyn Monroe (Lifetime)

=== Hosting ===
Hosting
**Outstanding Host for a Reality or Reality-Competition Program**
- **Jane Lynch for Hollywood Game Night (NBC)**
  - Tom Bergeron for Dancing with the Stars (ABC)
  - Anthony Bourdain for The Taste (ABC)
  - Cat Deeley for So You Think You Can Dance (Fox)
  - Heidi Klum and Tim Gunn for Project Runway (Lifetime)

=== Interactive Media ===
Interactive Media
**Outstanding Multiplatform Storytelling (Juried)**: **Archer Scavenger Hunt (FX)**; **The Singles Project (Bravo Digital)**	**Outstanding Original Interactive Program (Juried)**: **AMEX Unstaged: Taylor Swift Experience (americanexpress.com/unstagedapp)**; **Emma Approved (Pemberley Digital / YouTube)**
**Outstanding Social TV Experience (Juried)**: **@midnight with Chris Hardwick (Comedy Central)**; **The Tonight Show Starring Jimmy Fallon (NBC)**	**Outstanding User Experience and Visual Design (Juried)**: **Sleepy Hollow: Virtual Reality Experience (Fox)**

=== Lighting Design / Direction ===
Lighting Design / Direction
**Outstanding Lighting Design / Lighting Direction for a Variety Series**: **The Voice (Episode: "Episode 818A") (NBC)**; American Idol (Episode: "Finale") (Fox); Dancing with the Stars (Episode: "Episode 1911A") (ABC); Late Show with David Letterman (Episode: "Show 4190") (CBS); Saturday Night Live (Episode: "Host: Amy Adams") (NBC); So You Think You Can Dance (Episode: "Finale") (Fox)	**Outstanding Lighting Design / Lighting Direction for a Variety Special**: **Super Bowl XLIX Halftime Show starring Katy Perry (NBC)**; 57th Grammy Awards (CBS); 87th Academy Awards (ABC); Dancing with the Stars: 10th Anniversary Special (ABC); The Saturday Night Live 40th Anniversary Special (NBC)

=== Main Title Design ===
Main Title Design
**Outstanding Main Title Design**
- **Manhattan (WGN America)**
  - American Horror Story: Freak Show (FX)
  - Bosch (Amazon)
  - Halt and Catch Fire (AMC)
  - Marvel's Daredevil (Netflix)
  - Olive Kitteridge (HBO)

=== Make-up ===
Make-up
**Outstanding Make-up for a Single-Camera Series (Non-Prosthetic)**: **Game of Thrones (Episode: "Mother's Mercy") (HBO)**; Boardwalk Empire (Episode: "What Jesus Said") (HBO); The Knick (Episode: "Method and Madness") (Cinemax); Mad Men (Episode: "Person to Person") (AMC); Sons of Anarchy (Episode: "Faith and Despondency") (FX)	**Outstanding Make-up for a Multi-Camera Series or Special (Non-Prosthetic)**: **The Saturday Night Live 40th Anniversary Special (NBC)**; Dancing with the Stars (Episode: "1907") (ABC); Key & Peele (Episode: "Episode 406") (Comedy Central); RuPaul's Drag Race (Episode: "ShakesQueer") (Logo); So You Think You Can Dance (Episode: "Episode 1108") (Fox)
**Outstanding Make-up for a Limited Series or Movie (Non-Prosthetic)**: **American Horror Story: Freak Show (FX)**; Bessie (HBO); Houdini (Episode: "Part 1") (History); Olive Kitteridge (HBO); The Secret Life of Marilyn Monroe (Lifetime)	**Outstanding Prosthetic Make-up for a Series, Limited Series, Movie, or Special**: **American Horror Story: Freak Show (FX)**; Boardwalk Empire (Episode: "The Good Listener") (HBO); Game of Thrones (Episode: "Hardhome") (HBO); The Knick (Episode: "Crutchfield") (Cinemax); Penny Dreadful (Episode: "Grand Guignol") (Showtime); The Walking Dead (Episode: "Strangers") (AMC)

=== Motion Design ===
Motion Design
**Outstanding Motion Design (Juried)**
- **How We Got to Now – Luke Best, Miles Presland Donovan, Peter Mellor, and Chris Sayer (PBS)**

=== Music ===
Music
**Outstanding Music Composition for a Series (Original Dramatic Score)**: **Jeff Beal for House of Cards (Episode: "Chapter 32") (Netflix)**; Jeff Danna and Mychael Danna for Tyrant (Episode: "Pilot") (FX); Abel Korzeniowski for Penny Dreadful (Episode: "Closer Than Sisters") (Showtime); Maurizio Malagnini for The Paradise (Episode: "Episode 8") (PBS); Bear McCreary for Outlander (Episode: "Sassenach") (Starz); Duncan Thum for Chef's Table (Episode: "Francis Mallmann") (Netflix)	**Outstanding Music Composition for a Limited Series, Movie, or Special (Original Dramatic Score)**: **Rachel Portman for Bessie (HBO)**; Sean Callery for 24: Live Another Day (Episode: "11:00 a.m. – 12:00 p.m.") (Fox); Kevin Kliesch for Sofia the First: The Curse of Princess Ivy (Disney Channel); Mac Quayle for American Horror Story: Freak Show (Episode: "Orphans") (FX); William Ross for Away and Back (Hallmark Channel); Dominik Scherrer for The Missing (Episode: "Eden") (Starz)
**Outstanding Music Direction**: **Stevie Wonder: Songs in the Key of Life – An All-Star GRAMMY Salute (CBS)**; 87th Academy Awards (ABC); Elf: Buddy's Musical Christmas (NBC); The Kennedy Center Honors (CBS); Live from Lincoln Center – Sweeney Todd: The Demon Barber of Fleet Street in Concert with the New York Philharmonic (PBS); Peter Pan Live! (NBC)	**Outstanding Original Music and Lyrics**: **Inside Amy Schumer (Episode: "Cool With It") (Song: "Girl You Don't Need Make Up") (Comedy Central)**; 87th Academy Awards (Song: "Moving Pictures") (ABC); The Comedians (Episode: "Celebrity Guest") (Song: "Kiss an Old Man") (FX); Glee (Episode: "Dreams Come True") (Song: "This Time") (Fox); How Murray Saved Christmas (Song: "You Gotta Believe") (NBC); Sons of Anarchy (Episode: "Papa's Goods") (Song: "Come Join the Murder") (FX)
**Outstanding Original Main Title Theme Music**: **Dustin O'Halloran for Transparent (Amazon)**; Jeff Beal for The Dovekeepers (CBS); Bruce Broughton and John Debney for Texas Rising (History); Jeff Danna and Mychael Danna for Tyrant (FX); Abel Korzeniowski for Penny Dreadful (Showtime); Daniele Luppi for Marco Polo (Netflix)

=== Picture Editing ===
Picture Editing
**Outstanding Single-Camera Picture Editing for a Drama Series**: **Game of Thrones – Katie Weiland (Episode: "The Dance of Dragons") (HBO)**; Better Call Saul – Kelley Dixon (Episode: "Five-O") (AMC); Better Call Saul – Kelley Dixon and Chris McCaleb (Episode: "Marco") (AMC); Game of Thrones – Tim Porter (Episode: "Hardhome") (HBO); Mad Men – Tom Wilson (Episode: "Person to Person") (AMC)	**Outstanding Single-Camera Picture Editing for a Comedy Series**: **Silicon Valley – Brian Merken (Episode: "Two Days of the Condor") (HBO)**; Inside Amy Schumer – Jesse Gordon, Nick Paley, Billy Song, and Laura Weinberg (Episode: "Last Fuckable Day") (Comedy Central); The Last Man on Earth – Stacey Schroeder (Episode: "Alive in Tucson") (Fox); Silicon Valley – Tim Roche (Episode: "Sand Hill Shuffle") (HBO); Transparent – Catherine Haight (Episode: "Pilot") (Amazon)
**Outstanding Single-Camera Picture Editing for a Limited Series or Movie**: **Olive Kitteridge – Jeffrey M. Werner (Episode: "Security") (HBO)**; 24: Live Another Day – Scott Powell (Episode: "10:00 p.m. – 11:00 a.m.") (Fox); American Crime – Luyen Vu (Episode: "Episode One") (ABC); Houdini – David Beatty and Sabrina Plisco (Episode: "Part 1") (History); Wolf Hall – David Blackmore (Episode: "Entirely Beloved") (PBS)	**Outstanding Multi-Camera Picture Editing for a Comedy Series**: **The Big Bang Theory – Peter Chakos (Episode: "The Comic Book Store Regeneration") (CBS)**; 2 Broke Girls – Darryl Bates and Ben Bosse (Episode: "And the Move-In Meltdown") (CBS); Hot in Cleveland – Ronald A. Volk (Episode: "I Hate Goodbyes") (TV Land); Mike & Molly – Stephen Prime (Episode: "Fight to the Finish") (CBS)
**Outstanding Picture Editing for Variety Programming**: **The Colbert Report – Jason Baker (Segment: "Farewell Colbert") (Comedy Central)**; Conan – Robert James Ashe, Dave Grecu, and Christopher P. Heller (Segment: "Conan in Cuba") (TBS); Key & Peele – Phil Davis, Christian Hoffman, and Rich LaBrie (Segment: "Scariest Movie Ever") (Comedy Central); Last Week Tonight with John Oliver – Ryan Barger (Segment: "N.S.A. Edward Snowden") (HBO); Late Show with David Letterman – Andrew Evangelista and Mark Spada (Segment: "Finale Montage") (CBS)	**Outstanding Picture Editing for Nonfiction Programming**: **The Jinx: The Life and Deaths of Robert Durst – Caitlyn Green, Richard Hankin, Shelby Siegel, and Zac Stuart-Pontier (Episode: "Chapter 1: A Body in the Bay") (HBO)**; The Case Against 8 – Kate Amend (HBO); Citizenfour – Mathilde Bonnefoy (HBO); Going Clear: Scientology and the Prison of Belief – Andy Grieve (HBO); Kurt Cobain: Montage of Heck – Joe Beshenkovsky and Brett Morgen (HBO)
**Outstanding Picture Editing for Reality Programming**: **Deadliest Catch – Alex Durham, Josh Earl, and Alexander Rubinow (Episode: "A Brotherhood Tested") (Discovery Channel)**; The Amazing Race – Andy Castor, Julian Gomez, Andrew Kozar, Ryan Leamy, Jennifer Nelson, Paul C. Nielsen, and Jacob Parsons (Episode: "Morocc' and Roll") (CBS); Project Runway – Andrea Bailey, Jim Bedford, Julie Cohen, Ed Greene, and Jensen Rufe (Episode: "Finale", Part 2) (Lifetime); Project Runway – Mary DeChambres and Carlos David Rivera (Episode: "Something Wicked This Way Comes") (Lifetime); Shark Tank – David R. Finkelstein, Terri Maloney, Ed Martinez, Matt McCartie, Matt Stevenson, Andrew Oliver, Nick Staller, and Joel Watson (Episode: "Episode 608") (ABC); Survivor – David Armstrong, Tim Atzinger, Bill Bowden, Frederick Hawthorne, Evan Mediuch, Joubin Mortazavi, and Plowden Schumacher (Episode: "Survivor Warfare (Worlds Apart)") (CBS)

=== Production Design ===
Production Design
**Outstanding Production Design for a Narrative Contemporary or Fantasy Program (One Hour or More)**: **Game of Thrones (Episodes: "High Sparrow"; "Unbowed, Unbent, Unbroken"; "Hardhome") (HBO)**; Constantine (Episodes: "The Darkness Beneath"; "Feast of Friends"; "The Saint of Last Resorts", Part 1) (NBC); Gotham (Episode: "Pilot") (Fox); House of Cards (Episodes: "Chapter 29"; "Chapter 36") (Netflix); True Blood (Episodes: "Jesus Gonna Be Here"; "I Found You"; "Fire in the Hole") (HBO)	**Outstanding Production Design for a Narrative Period Program (One Hour or More)**: **Boardwalk Empire (Episodes: "Golden Days for Boys and Girls"; "Friendless Child"; "Eldorado") (HBO)**; **The Knick (Episodes: "Method and Madness"; "Mr. Paris Shoes"; "Get the Rope") (Cinemax)**; Downton Abbey (Episode: "A Moorland Holiday") (PBS); Mad Men (Episode: "Person to Person") (AMC); Masters of Sex (Episodes: "Blackbird"; "Below the Belt"; "One for the Money, Two for the Show") (Showtime)
**Outstanding Production Design for a Narrative Program (Half-Hour or Less)**: **Silicon Valley (Episodes: "Sand Hill Shuffle"; "Homicide"; "Adult Content") (HBO)**; 2 Broke Girls (Episodes: "And the Zero Tolerance"; "And the Fun Factory"; "And a Loan for Christmas") (CBS); The Big Bang Theory (Episodes: "The First Pitch Insufficiency"; "The Clean Room Infilltration"; "The Skywalker Incursion") (CBS); Hot in Cleveland (Episodes: "Vegas, Baby"; "I Hate Goodbyes"; "All About Elka") (TV Land); Transparent (Episode: "The Letting Go") (Amazon); Veep (Episodes: "Joint Session"; "Tehran"; "Convention") (HBO)	**Outstanding Production Design for Variety, Nonfiction, Reality, or Reality-Competition Programming**: **Portlandia (Episodes: "Dead Pets"; "Call Me Al"; "Fashion") (IFC)**; 57th Grammy Awards (CBS); 87th Academy Awards (ABC); Peter Pan Live! (NBC); The Voice (Episodes: "Episode 701"; "Episode 806"; "Episode 815A") (NBC)

=== Sound ===
Sound
**Outstanding Sound Editing for a Series**: **Game of Thrones (Episode: "Hardhome") (HBO)**; Black Sails (Episode: "XVIII.") (Starz); Boardwalk Empire (Episode: "The Good Listener") (HBO); Gotham (Episode: "All Happy Families Are Alike") (Fox); Marvel's Daredevil (Episode: "Speak of the Devil") (Netflix); The Walking Dead (Episode: "Conquer") (AMC)	**Outstanding Sound Editing for a Limited Series, Movie, or Special**: **Houdini (Episode: "Part 1") (History)**; 24: Live Another Day (Episode: "7:00 p.m. – 8:00 p.m.") (Fox); American Crime (Episode: "Episode One") (ABC); American Horror Story: Freak Show (Episode: "Curtain Call") (FX); Texas Rising (Episode: "Vengeance is Mine") (History)
**Outstanding Sound Editing for Nonfiction Programming (Single or Multi-Camera)**: **Foo Fighters: Sonic Highways (Episode: "Seattle") (HBO)**; Anthony Bourdain: Parts Unknown (Episode: "Madagascar") (CNN); Going Clear: Scientology and the Prison of Belief (HBO); The Jinx: The Life and Deaths of Robert Durst (Episode: "Chapter 2: Poor Little Rich Boy") (HBO); Kurt Cobain: Montage of Heck (HBO)	**Outstanding Sound Mixing for a Comedy or Drama Series (One Hour)**: **Game of Thrones (Episode: "Hardhome") (HBO)**; Better Call Saul (Episode: "Marco") (AMC); Downton Abbey (Episode: "A Moorland Holiday") (PBS); Homeland (Episode: "Redux") (Showtime); House of Cards (Episode: "Chapter 27") (Netflix)
**Outstanding Sound Mixing for a Limited Series or Movie**: **Bessie (HBO)**; American Crime (Episode: "Episode Eleven") (ABC); American Horror Story: Freak Show (Episode: "Magical Thinking") (FX); Houdini (Episode: "Part 1") (History); Texas Rising (Episode: "Vengeance is Mine") (History)	**Outstanding Sound Mixing for a Comedy or Drama Series (Half-Hour) and Animation**: **Modern Family (Episode: "Connection Lost") (ABC)**; Parks and Recreation (Episode: "One Last Ride") (NBC); Silicon Valley (Episode: "Server Space") (HBO); The Simpsons (Episode: "Simpsorama") (Fox); Veep (Episode: "Mommy Meyer") (HBO)
**Outstanding Sound Mixing for a Variety Series or Special**: **The Saturday Night Live 40th Anniversary Special (NBC)**; 57th Grammy Awards (CBS); 87th Academy Awards (ABC); Late Show with David Letterman (Episode: "Show 4214") (CBS); The Voice (Episode: "Finale Results") (NBC)	**Outstanding Sound Mixing for Nonfiction Programming**: **Foo Fighters: Sonic Highways (Episode: "Seattle") (HBO)**; Anthony Bourdain: Parts Unknown (Episode: "Jamaica") (CNN); Deadliest Catch (Episode: "Lost at Sea") (Discovery Channel); Going Clear: Scientology and the Prison of Belief (HBO); The Jinx: The Life and Deaths of Robert Durst (Episode: "Chapter 2: Poor Little Rich Boy") (HBO); Kurt Cobain: Montage of Heck (HBO)

=== Special Visual Effects ===
Special Visual Effects
**Outstanding Special Visual Effects**: **Game of Thrones (Episode: "The Dance of Dragons") (HBO)**; Black Sails (Episode: "XVIII.") (Starz); The Flash (Episode: "Grodd Lives") (The CW); Marvel's Agents of S.H.I.E.L.D. (Episode: "The Dirty Half Dozen") (ABC); Vikings (Episode: "To the Gates!") (History)	**Outstanding Special Visual Effects in a Supporting Role**: **American Horror Story: Freak Show (Episode: "Edward Mordrake", Part 2) (FX)**; Boardwalk Empire (Episode: "Golden Days for Boys and Girls") (HBO); Gotham (Episode: "Lovecraft") (Fox); Marvel's Daredevil (Episode: "Speak of the Devil") (Netflix); The Walking Dead (Episode: "Conquer") (AMC)

=== Stunt Coordination ===
Stunt Coordination
**Outstanding Stunt Coordination for a Comedy Series or Variety Program**: **Brooklyn Nine-Nine (Fox)**; Community (Yahoo!); It's Always Sunny in Philadelphia (FX); Saturday Night Live (NBC); Unbreakable Kimmy Schmidt (Netflix)	**Outstanding Stunt Coordination for a Drama Series, Limited Series, or Movie**: **Game of Thrones (HBO)**; The Blacklist (NBC); Boardwalk Empire (HBO); Sons of Anarchy (FX); The Walking Dead (AMC)

=== Technical Direction ===
Technical Direction
**Outstanding Technical Direction, Camerawork, Video Control for a Series**: **Saturday Night Live (Episode: "Host: Taraji P. Henson") (NBC)**; The Big Bang Theory (Episode: "The Expedition Approximation") (CBS); The Daily Show with Jon Stewart (Episode: "Show 20015") (Comedy Central); Dancing with the Stars (Episode: "Episode 2009") (ABC); Late Show with David Letterman (Episode: "Show 4214") (CBS); The Voice (Episode: "Episode 718B") (NBC)	**Outstanding Technical Direction, Camerawork, Video Control for a Limited Series, Movie, or Special**: **87th Academy Awards (ABC)**; 68th Tony Awards (CBS); The Kennedy Center Honors (CBS); Peter Pan Live! (NBC); The Saturday Night Live 40th Anniversary Special (NBC)

=== Writing ===
Writing
**Outstanding Writing for Nonfiction Programming**: **Going Clear: Scientology and the Prison of Belief (HBO)**; American Experience (Episode: "Last Days in Vietnam") (PBS); Anthony Bourdain: Parts Unknown (Episode: "Iran") (CNN); Kurt Cobain: Montage of Heck (HBO); The Roosevelts: An Intimate History (Episode: "Episode 5: The Rising Road (1933–1939)") (PBS)	**Outstanding Writing for a Variety Special**: **Louis C.K.: Live at the Comedy Store, Written by Louis C.K. (LouisCK.net)**; 72nd Golden Globe Awards (NBC); Key & Peele's Super Bowl Special, Written by Brendan Hunt, Keegan-Michael Key, Jordan Peele, and Rich Talarico (Comedy Central); Mel Brooks: Live at the Geffen, Written by Mel Brooks (HBO); The Saturday Night Live 40th Anniversary Special (NBC)

== Wins by network ==
Network	Program	Individual	Total
HBO	6	23	29
NBC	2	9	11
FX	2	6	8
ABC	1	3	4
Cartoon Network	2	2	4
Comedy Central	1	3	4
Fox	1	3	4
PBS	1	3	4
Amazon	0	3	3
CBS	0	3	3
Discovery Channel	1	2	3
Netflix	0	3	3
Adult Swim	0	2	2
Cartoon Network	0	2	2
americanexpress.com/unstagedapp	1	0	1
Bravo	1	0	1
Cinemax	0	1	1
CNN	1	0	1
Disney XD	0	1	1
funnyordie.com	1	0	1
History	0	1	1
IFC	0	1	1
LouisCK.net	0	1	1
Pemberley Digital	1	0	1
Showtime	0	1	1
WGN America	0	1	1
YouTube	1	0	1

== Programs with multiple awards ==
Program	Awards
Game of Thrones	8
American Horror Story: Freak Show	5
Bessie	4
The Saturday Night Live 40th Anniversary Special	4
Deadliest Catch	3
Going Clear: Scientology and The Prison of Belief	3
Transparent	3
Adventure Time	2
Boardwalk Empire	2
Foo Fighters: Sonic Highways	2
House of Cards	2
The Jinx: The Life and Deaths of Robert Durst	2
Olive Kitteridge	2
Over the Garden Wall	2
Saturday Night Live	2
Silicon Valley	2
Super Bowl XLIX Halftime Show starring Katy Perry	2
Tome of the Unknown	2
