= Hardhome =

- Game of Thrones episode
- Episode no.: Season 5 Episode 8
- Directed by: Miguel Sapochnik
- Written by: David Benioff; D. B. Weiss
- Cinematography by: Fabian Wagner
- Editing by: Tim Porter
- Original air date: May 31, 2015
- Running time: 60 minutes

Guest appearances
- Anton Lesser as Qyburn; Ben Crompton as Edd Tollett; Faye Marsay as the Waif; Birgitte Hjort Sørensen as Karsi; Enzo Cilenti as Yezzan zo Qaggaz; Zachary Baharov as Loboda; Hannah Waddingham as Septa Unella; Brenock O'Connor as Olly; Richard Brake as the Night King; Ian Whyte as Wun Wun; Ross O'Hennessy as the Lord of Bones; Murray McArthur as Dim Dalba; Brann Dailor, Brent Hinds, and Bill Kelliher as wildlings (uncredited)

Episode chronology
← Previous "The Gift"	Next → "The Dance of Dragons"
- Game of Thrones season 5

"Hardhome" is the eighth episode of the fifth season of HBO's medieval fantasy television series Game of Thrones, and the 48th overall. It was written by series co-creators David Benioff and D. B. Weiss, and directed by Miguel Sapochnik. It first aired on May 31, 2015.

The episode's main plot focuses on the battle against the Army of the Dead at Hardhome, in which Jon Snow leads a rare cooperative effort between the Night's Watch and the Free Folk against the undead soldiers led by the Night King. The battle is mentioned, but not seen, in Martin's novel from which the fifth season is adapted, A Dance with Dragons. Other plotlines in the episode include Tyrion Lannister and Daenerys Targaryen meeting in Meereen, Cersei Lannister suffering from thirst in her cell, and Theon Greyjoy revealing to Sansa Stark that her brothers Bran and Rickon are alive.

The episode received acclaim from critics and fans, with many hailing it as one of the series' best episodes, praising the Hardhome attack sequence, action, visuals, performances, final scene, and the first interactions between Tyrion and Daenerys. It achieved a viewership of 7.01 million during its initial airing in the United States. At the 67th Primetime Emmy Awards, "Hardhome" was nominated for six awards, and was Peter Dinklage's pick to support his nomination for Outstanding Supporting Actor in a Drama Series, which he won.

== Plot ==
=== In Braavos ===
Arya takes the identity of Lanna, an oyster seller, and is sent by Jaqen to assassinate the "Thin Man," a dishonest insurance salesman.

=== In Meereen ===
Tyrion convinces Daenerys to allow him to advise her and to spare Jorah's life, but points out that Jorah cannot be trusted and he is exiled again. Tyrion warns Daenerys that she will not succeed in taking the Iron Throne without a powerful Westerosi house backing her; Daenerys compares the rise and fall of the Great Houses to spokes on a wheel, and declares that she will "break the wheel."

Jorah returns to Yezzan and asks to fight in the fighting pits.

=== In King's Landing ===
Cersei continues to refuse to confess to her crimes. Qyburn visits her and informs her she is being charged for incest and Robert's murder and Pycelle has summoned Kevan to serve as Hand. He also reassures her that "the work continues."

=== At Winterfell ===
Reek tells Sansa there is no escape from Ramsay and admits he didn't kill Bran and Rickon, and he actually killed two farmboys, burning their bodies so no one would know they were not the Stark boys. Roose and Ramsay plan for battle with Stannis' army. Ramsay wants to take the fight to Stannis, and asks for twenty men.

=== At the Wall ===
Olly expresses misgivings about Jon's alliance with the wildlings. Sam explains that the alliance is necessary to defeat the White Walkers, but Olly appears unconvinced.

=== At Hardhome ===
Jon and Tormund arrive at Hardhome and meet the Lord of Bones, who is killed by Tormund after a tense standoff. Tormund summons the elders and Jon offers to let the wildlings settle south of the Wall if they help the Night's Watch against the White Walkers. 5,000 wildlings are convinced, but as they prepare to set sail the town comes under attack from wights. Jon and the Magnar of Thenn, Loboda, enter a hut to retrieve the dragonglass blades, but a White Walker kills Loboda and throws Jon outside. Jon kills the White Walker with his Valyrian steel sword, but Hardhome's walls fall to the wights and Jon and his remaining allies are forced to flee. As they escape, Jon turns back in horror and awe as the Night King revives the dead as wights.

== Production ==
=== Writing ===
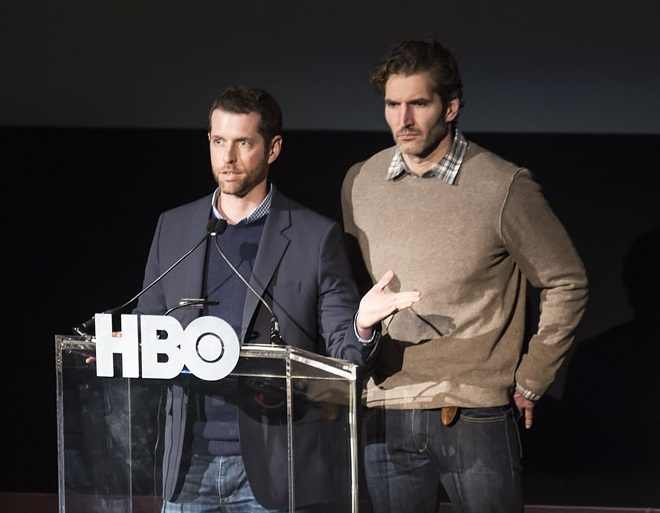
The episode was written by series co-creators David Benioff and D. B. Weiss.

This episode was written by David Benioff and D. B. Weiss, the series' creators. It contains content from George Martin's novels A Feast for Crows, chapters Cersei X and Cat of the Canals and A Dance with Dragons, chapter The Ugly Little Girl.

Like other episodes this season, "Hardhome" contained a large amount of original material that does not appear in Martin's novels. This includes the battle scene in which the Wildlings and Night's Watch are ambushed by the White Walkers and army of the undead, as well as the meeting of Daenerys Targaryen and Tyrion Lannister. According to Erik Kain of Forbes, "We have now fully parted ways with the books. If the rest of Season 5 hadn't convinced you that the show was forging its own path, this episode is the final nail in the coffin."

=== Casting ===
Birgitte Hjort Sørensen was cast as Karsi, a wildling chieftain originally written as a male character. Zachary Baharov appeared as Loboda, a Thenn leader, and Ross O'Hennessy replaced Edward Dogliani as the Lord Of Bones in this episode. Ian Whyte, who had previously been cast as a White Walker, played the giant Wun Wun. Members of the metal band Mastodon acted as wildlings at Hardhome in a cameo appearance.

=== Filming ===
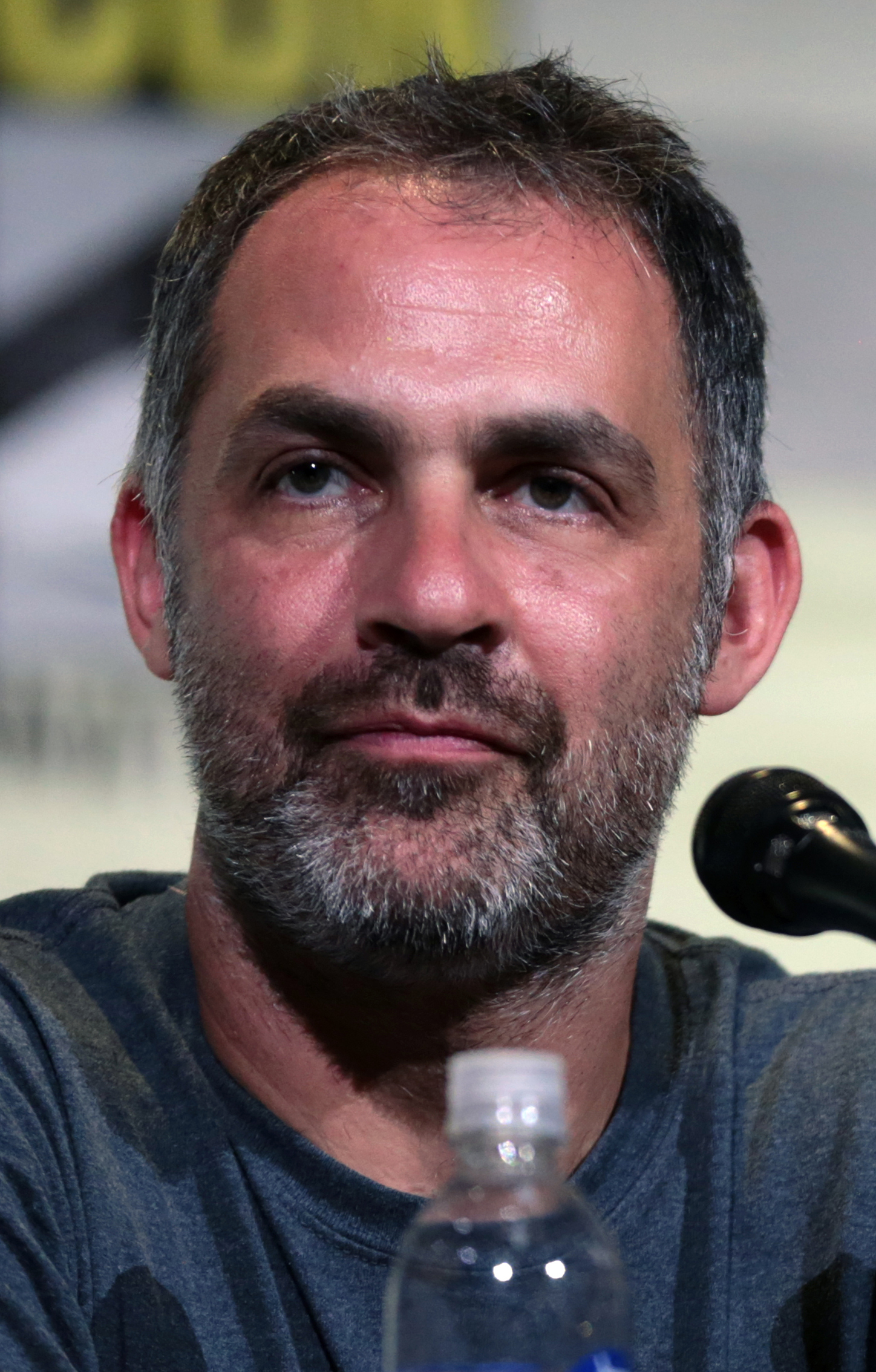
Miguel Sapochnik served as director for the episode, his second episode for the series.

"Hardhome" was directed by Miguel Sapochnik. He joined the series as a director in the fifth season. He also directed the previous episode, "The Gift". The sequence at Hardhome was filmed at the Magheramorne quarry and took nearly a month to film.

== Reception ==
=== Ratings ===
"Hardhome" was watched by an estimated 7.01 million American viewers during its first airing.

With Live+7 DVR viewing factored in, the episode had an overall rating of 9.94 million viewers, and a 5.1 in the 18–49 demographic. In the United Kingdom, the episode was viewed by 2.383 million viewers, making it the highest-rated broadcast that week. It also received 0.211 million timeshift viewers.

=== Critical reception ===
The episode received universal acclaim from both critics and viewers, with some critics calling it among the best episodes of the series. It received a 100% rating on the review aggregator Rotten Tomatoes from 52 reviews with an average rating of 9.74 out of 10 and the critics' consensus reading "Following several episodes of setup, 'Hardhome' blends a sharp script with spectacular blockbuster action to offer viewers a powerful, game-changing payoff."

The Atlantic named "Hardhome" one of the best television episodes of 2015. Erik Kain of Forbes called this "one of the best, most exciting episodes I've seen in the entire show's run, let alone this season," citing "High action and a series of pretty crazy revelations." Matt Fowler of IGN gave the episode 10/10, labeling it a "masterpiece". He praised the Tyrion/Daenerys scenes but predominantly the final sequence, which he described as "edge-of-your-seat exciting" and also "quite terrifying". This made "Hardhome" the first episode in season 5 to receive a 10/10 rating from IGN. Matt Fowler also named it the best episode of the entire series. Both Myles McNutt and Erik Adams of The A.V. Club gave the episode the website's highest grade, "A". They called it "a welcome reminder that [the show is still unpredictable]," with McNutt citing it as his favorite episode of the series thus far. Bridle Roman of SFX gave the episode a perfect five stars, and highlighted the character of Karsi, played by Birgitte Hjort Sørensen, as a great addition and "her death hits hard" even if "we have only seen her for a few scenes". The episode received praise even from some of its usual critics: Madeline Davies of Jezebel wrote, "I feel like I haven't said this in a long time, but last night's Game of Thrones was ...cool?" Davies cited the quality of the battle scene and unifying theme of hope in desperate situations as the episode's key strengths, specifically that the abused and tormented Sansa learns that her brothers may still be alive and that though Jon faces "the seemingly impossible task of defeating a constantly growing army of White Walkers, he at least possesses a sword that can kill them." Kirsten Acuna of Business Insider reports that this is the single most popular episode to date as rated by fans, noting that the "tremendous reaction is in complete juxtaposition with reactions to an episode that aired two weeks ago," which received one of the series' lowest fan ratings. Acuna credits this response to the quality of the battle scene, which featured "a fighting army of the walking dead which would easily give the AMC series of the same name a run for its money."

=== Awards and nominations ===
Year	Award	Category	Nominee(s)	Result	Ref.
2015	Primetime Emmy Awards	Outstanding Supporting Actor in a Drama Series	Peter Dinklage as Tyrion Lannister	Won	
2015	Primetime Creative Arts Emmy Awards	Outstanding Cinematography for a Single-Camera Series	Fabian Wagner	Nominated	
2015	Primetime Creative Arts Emmy Awards	Outstanding Production Design for a Fantasy Program	Deborah Riley, Paul Ghirardani, Rob Cameron	Won	
2015	Primetime Creative Arts Emmy Awards	Outstanding Prosthetic Makeup for a Series	Jane Walker, Barrie Gower, and Sarah Gower	Nominated	
2015	Primetime Creative Arts Emmy Awards	Outstanding Single-Camera Picture Editing for a Drama Series	Tim Porter	Nominated	
2015	Primetime Creative Arts Emmy Awards	Outstanding Sound Editing for a Series	Tim Kimmel, Paula Fairfield, Bradley C. Katona, Peter Bercovitch, David Klotz, Jeffrey Wilhoit, Dylan T. Wilhoit	Won	
2015	Primetime Creative Arts Emmy Awards	Outstanding Sound Mixing for a Series	Ronan Hill, Richard Dyer, Onnalee Blank, Mathew Waters	Won	
2015	British Society of Cinematographers	Best Cinematography in a Television Drama	Fabian Wagner	Nominated	
2015	British Society of Cinematographers	ACO/BSC/GBCT Operators TV Drama Award	David Morgan, Sean Savage, Ben Wilson, David Worley	Won	
2015	Hollywood Professional Alliance	Outstanding Sound	Tim Kimmel, Paula Fairfield, Bradley Katona, Paul Bercovitch, Onnalee Blank, Mathew Waters	Nominated	
2015	Hollywood Professional Alliance	Outstanding Color Grading	Joe Finley	Nominated	
2015	Hollywood Professional Alliance	Outstanding Editing	Tim Porter	Nominated	
2015	IGN Awards	Best TV Episode		Won	
2015	IGN People's Choice Awards	Best TV Episode		Nominated	
2016	ADG Excellence in Production Design Award	One-Hour Single Camera Fantasy Television Series	Deborah Riley	Won	
2016	Shorty Awards	GIF of The Year	Come At Me Bro	Nominated	
2016	Cinema Audio Society Awards	Outstanding Achievement in Sound Mixing - Television Series – One Hour	Ronan Hill, Richard Dyer, Onnalee Blank, Mathew Waters, Brett Voss	Won	
2016	American Society of Cinematographers	Outstanding Achievement in Cinematography in Regular Series	Fabian Wagner	Nominated	
2016	American Cinema Editors Awards	Best Edited One-Hour Series For Non-Commercial Television	Tim Porter	Nominated	
2016	Golden Reel Awards	Best Sound Editing in Television, Short Form: FX/Foley	Tim Kimmel	Won	
2016	Golden Reel Awards	Best Sound Editing in Television, Short Form: Dialogue / ADR	Tim Kimmel	Won	
2016	Golden Reel Awards	Best Sound Editing in Television, Short Form: Music	David Klotz	Nominated	
2016	USC Scripter Award	Best Adapted Screenplay	David Benioff and D.B. Weiss	Nominated	
2016	Visual Effects Society Awards	Outstanding Effects Simulations in an Episode, Commercial, or Real-Time Project	David Ramos, Antonio Lado, Piotr Weiss, Félix Bergés	Won	
2016	Visual Effects Society Awards	Outstanding Compositing in a Photoreal Episode	Eduardo Díaz, Guillermo Orbe, Oscar Perea, Inmaculada Nadela	Won	
