= Kill the Boy =

- Game of Thrones episode
- Episode no.: Season 5 Episode 5
- Directed by: Jeremy Podeswa
- Written by: Bryan Cogman
- Cinematography by: Gregory Middleton
- Editing by: Crispin Green
- Original air date: May 10, 2015
- Running time: 56 minutes

Guest appearances
- Ian McElhinney as Ser Barristan Selmy; Peter Vaughan as Maester Aemon; Tara Fitzgerald as Selyse Baratheon; Owen Teale as Ser Alliser Thorne; Jacob Anderson as Grey Worm; Joel Fry as Hizdahr zo Loraq; Ben Crompton as Edd Tollett; Daniel Portman as Podrick Payne; Charlotte Hope as Myranda; Kerry Ingram as Shireen Baratheon; Brenock O'Connor as Olly; Elizabeth Webster as Walda Bolton; Brian Fortune as Othell Yarwyck; Michael Condron as Bowen Marsh

Episode chronology
← Previous "Sons of the Harpy"	Next → "Unbowed, Unbent, Unbroken"
- Game of Thrones season 5

"Kill the Boy" is the fifth episode of the fifth season of HBO's medieval fantasy television series Game of Thrones. The 45th episode overall, it was written by Bryan Cogman, and directed by Jeremy Podeswa, his directorial debut for the series. The episode first aired on HBO on May 10, 2015.

In the episode, Brienne of Tarth and Podrick Payne attempt to make contact with Sansa Stark. In Meereen, Daenerys Targaryen clashes with the nobles of Meereen following Barristan Selmy's death, but later agrees to marry Hizdahr zo Loraq. In Old Valyria, Tyrion Lannister and Jorah Mormont are attacked by stone men. At the Wall, Stannis Baratheon prepares to leave Castle Black and march on Winterfell, and Jon Snow frees Tormund from captivity so that he can lead Jon to the wildling camp at Hardhome. The name of the episode comes from a piece of advice Maester Aemon gives Jon, to "kill the boy" and "let the man be born".

This episode received positive reviews, with critics mainly praising the performances and sense of tension. It marks the final appearance for Ian McElhinney (Ser Barristan Selmy).

== Plot ==
=== At the Wall ===
Jon seeks Aemon's advice, who counsels him to trust his instincts and "kill the boy" inside him and “become the man.” Jon frees Tormund and offers to allow the Wildlings to settle south of the Wall in return for an alliance with the Night's Watch when the White Walkers arrive. Tormund tells Jon most of the wildlings have fled to the town of Hardhome and Jon must accompany him to speak with them himself. Jon's plan is unpopular with the rest of the Night's Watch, but Jon persists.

Stannis questions Sam about dragonglass, which can kill a White Walker and tells him that Dragonstone has large supplies of dragonglass. The Baratheon army begins its march on Winterfell; Stannis insists on bringing Selyse and Shireen.

=== In the North ===
Brienne and Podrick arrive at an inn close to Winterfell and arrange for a man still loyal to the Starks to deliver a message to Sansa if she is ever in trouble, she should light a candle in Winterfell’s Broken Tower.

At Winterfell, Myranda shows Reek to Sansa. At dinner, Ramsay forces Reek to apologize to Sansa for murdering Bran and Rickon, despite being aware Theon didn't kill them. Irritated by Ramsay's petty cruelty, Roose tells him he and Walda are expecting a boy, much to Ramsay's chagrin. However, Roose later reassures Ramsay of his position and requests his help in defeating Stannis.

=== In Meereen ===
Grey Worm survives his clash with the Sons of the Harpy, but Barristan succumbs to his wounds. Daenerys orders Hizdahr and other leaders of the great families of Meereen to be brought before her, and orders her dragons to burn one of them as an intimidation tactic while imprisoning the others. She later visits Hizdahr in his cell and informs him not only will she reopen the fighting pits, she will make peace with the people of Meereen by marrying him. Meanwhile, Missandei visits Grey Worm as he recuperates. Grey Worm admits his fear of never seeing Missandei again and the two kiss.

=== In Valyria ===
Tyrion deduces Jorah is taking a shortcut through Valyria. After being distracted by Drogon flying overhead, they are attacked by stone men, people turned feral by the leprosy-like disease greyscale. Jorah saves Tyrion, but later finds a greyscale lesion on his wrist.

== Production ==
=== Writing ===
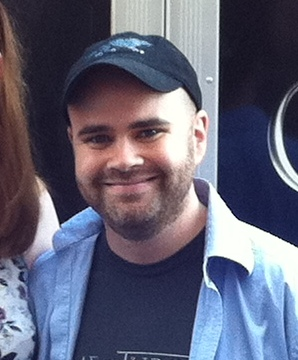
Series veteran Bryan Cogman wrote this episode.

This episode was written by the series producer Bryan Cogman, and contains content from two of George R. R. Martin's novels, A Feast for Crows, Samwell I, and Samwell IV, and A Dance with Dragons, chapters Jon II, Jon III, Jon XI, Jon XIII, Reek III, Daenerys V, and Tyrion V.

=== Filming ===
"Kill the Boy" was directed by Jeremy Podeswa. He also directed the subsequent episode, "Unbowed, Unbent, Unbroken", which received a Primetime Emmy Award nomination for Outstanding Directing for a Drama Series.

== Reception ==
=== Ratings ===
"Kill the Boy" was watched by an estimated 6.56 million American viewers during its first airing. With Live+7 DVR viewing factored in, the episode had an overall rating of 9.35 million viewers, and a 5.0 in the 18–49 demographic. In the United Kingdom, the episode was viewed by 2.220 million viewers, making it the highest-rated broadcast that week. It also received 0.130 million timeshift viewers.

=== Critical reception ===
"Kill the Boy" was received positively. Mike Hogan of Vanity Fair said that the creative team "just keeps cranking up the tension," while Joshua Yehl of IGN rated the episode 8.4/10 and wrote that the season "reaches its midway point with refreshed plot-lines and a rare moment of fantasy beauty." Christopher Orr of The Atlantic called the episode "superb" and described it as "crisply written, directed and performed." On Rotten Tomatoes, the episode has an approval rating of 94% based on 50 critic reviews collected were positive, with an average rating of 8.2 out of 10. The consensus reads: ""Kill the Boy" takes a fresh approach to themes of growth and change, using poignant storytelling to dramatize the challenges of making life-altering choices and struggles with power."
