= Unbowed, Unbent, Unbroken =

- Game of Thrones episode
- Theon watches in horror as Sansa Stark is raped by Ramsay Bolton. The scene caused controversy.
- Episode no.: Season 5 Episode 6
- Directed by: Jeremy Podeswa
- Written by: Bryan Cogman
- Cinematography by: Gregory Middleton
- Editing by: Crispin Green
- Original air date: May 17, 2015
- Running time: 53 minutes

Guest appearances
- Diana Rigg as Olenna Tyrell; Jonathan Pryce as High Sparrow; Alexander Siddig as Doran Martell; DeObia Oparei as Areo Hotah; Keisha Castle-Hughes as Obara Sand; Rosabell Laurenti Sellers as Tyene Sand; Jessica Henwick as Nymeria Sand; Finn Jones as Loras Tyrell; Will Tudor as Olyvar; Eugene Simon as Lancel Lannister; Faye Marsay as the Waif; Adewale Akinnuoye-Agbaje as Malko; Toby Sebastian as Trystane Martell; Nell Tiger Free as Myrcella Baratheon; Charlotte Hope as Myranda; Elizabeth Webster as Walda Bolton; Michael Yare as Slaver; James McKenzie Robinson as Joss; Hattie Gotobed as Ghita

Episode chronology
← Previous "Kill the Boy"	Next → "The Gift"
- Game of Thrones season 5

"Unbowed, Unbent, Unbroken" is the sixth episode of the fifth season of HBO's medieval fantasy television series Game of Thrones. The 46th episode overall, it was written by Bryan Cogman, and directed by Jeremy Podeswa. It first aired on HBO on May 17, 2015.

In the episode, Arya Stark is shown the secret of the Faceless Men of Braavos; Tyrion Lannister and Jorah Mormont are captured by slavers; Jaime Lannister attempts to take Myrcella Baratheon out of Dorne by force; Petyr Baelish meets with Cersei Lannister; Loras Tyrell is interrogated by the High Sparrow; and Sansa Stark marries Ramsay Bolton in Winterfell.

The name of the episode comes from the House Martell motto Unbowed, Unbent, Unbroken, words about strength that are put in contrast with the fates of several main characters, especially women, as these take a turn for the worse.

Contrary to the general acclaim previous episodes of the show received, this episode received polarized reviews from critics and viewers, with the fight scene in Dorne and its ending scene, which depicted a violent sexual assault, singled out for criticism. It received a rating of 54% on Rotten Tomatoes, and was the lowest-rated episode until "The Bells" in season 8. Nonetheless, director Jeremy Podeswa received an Emmy Award nomination for Outstanding Directing for a Drama Series for this episode.

== Plot ==
=== In Braavos ===
The Waif tells Arya in order to pass the Game of Faces she must be able to convincingly lie. Arya plays with Jaqen, who is able to detect Arya is lying about her hatred for the Hound, despite her insistence to the contrary. Later, when a man brings his sick daughter to the temple so she can die in peace, Arya lies to her, saying she [Arya] was ill like her in the past and gives her the temple's poisoned water to end her suffering. Jaqen takes Arya to a chamber where the Faceless Men store the faces of all the people who have died in the temple and tells her she is not yet ready to become no one, but she is ready to become someone else.

=== On the Valyrian peninsula ===
Tyrion tells Jorah his father Jeor is dead. Soon after, they are captured by slavers. After hearing Daenerys has reopened the fighting pits, Tyrion convinces the slavers to take them to Meereen, saying Jorah is an accomplished warrior.

=== In King's Landing ===
Baelish arrives in King's Landing and tells Cersei that Sansa will marry Ramsay at Winterfell. He gets her approval to lead the Knights of the Vale to destroy the victor of Stannis' attack on the Boltons and be named Warden of the North. Olenna arrives and tells Cersei her actions have put the Lannister-Tyrell alliance in peril, but Cersei claims she had nothing to do with Loras' arrest. At Loras' inquest, the High Sparrow interrogates Loras and Margaery, who both deny he is homosexual. Olyvar testifies against Loras and the Faith Militant arrests him; Margaery is also arrested for perjury.

=== In Dorne ===
Trystane Martell professes his love for Myrcella and insists they will be married one day. As the Sand Snakes prepare to abduct Myrcella, Bronn and Jaime disguise themselves as Dornish guards and infiltrate the Water Gardens to rescue her first. A skirmish between the two parties ensues before Dornish guards, led by Areo Hotah, arrive and arrest both groups. Ellaria Sand is also taken into custody.

=== At Winterfell ===
Before her wedding to Ramsay, Sansa is visited by Myranda claiming she was ordered to bathe her. While doing so, Myranda tries to intimidate Sansa by telling her not to bore Ramsay like "all the other girls". After his wedding to Sansa, Ramsay takes her to his chambers and rapes her. A horrified Theon attempts to leave, but Ramsay forces him to stay and watch.

== Production ==
=== Writing ===
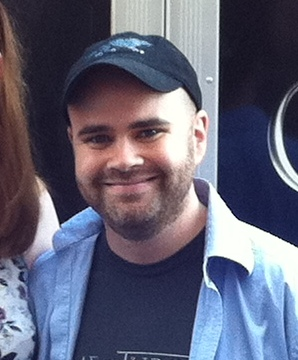
The episode was written by series producer Bryan Cogman.

This episode was written by the series producer Bryan Cogman, who has written at least one episode in every season of the show. It contains some content from George Martin's novel A Feast for Crows, chapters Arya II, The Queenmaker, Cat of the Canals, and Cersei X and A Dance with Dragons, chapters the Ugly Little Girl, Tyrion X, and the Prince of Winterfell, though series consultant Elio Garcia describes the portrayal of some of these events as "vastly different" from the original.

Like other episodes this season, it also included content and storylines written specifically for the television adaptation. Myles McNutt of A.V. Club points out that this changes the way the viewers interpret the showrunner's decisions. When describing his opinion of the decision to show Sansa raped by Ramsay on their wedding night (a storyline given to a different character, Jeyne Poole, in the books), he compares the scene to a similar one between Daenerys and Drogo in season one (which was consensual in the novels): "While we could frame the shifted events of Dany and Khal Drogo’s wedding night in light of where we knew Dany’s story was going, here we have no idea what this does to Sansa’s storyline." Most critics questioned the decision to show Sansa raped on her wedding night, but, as Business Insider pointed out, "The book version of this scene was much, much worse," with Theon ordered, graphically, to participate in Jeyne's mistreatment. In an interview with Entertainment Weekly, show writer Bryan Cogman was asked about the decision to decrease the level of violence, responding, "Lord no. No-no-no-no-no. No. It’s still a shared form of abuse that they have to endure, Sansa and Theon. But it’s not the extreme torture and humiliation that scene in the book is."

In an interview with Joanna Robinson in Vanity Fair, Cogman defended the scene and storyline, saying the intent was to give Sansa a meaningful role in the fifth season (which was drawn from 'A Dance with Dragons', a book in which the character of Sansa doesn't appear). When Benioff and Weiss suggested ending the episode by closing the bedroom door on Sansa, Ramsay, and Theon rather than show the act, it was Cogman who changed their minds. “I am the one, God help me,” Cogman said, “who said, ‘If we do this are we being dismissive of what that real horror would be behind that door? Are we being disrespectful of the severity of that situation?’ But we, of course, never wanted to make Sophie go through a graphic scene.” Cogman acknowledged the scene served as a pivot-point in the cultural discussion about sexual assault on screen, stating, “I will never presume to tell someone how they should feel about the scene itself. And believe me, I really tried to listen to all the criticism surrounding it and will continue to listen. I do take issue with the presumption of bad faith on our part—the idea that we treated Sophie or the character or the subject matter callously. I think if you watch the scene and see how it fits into the character's larger narrative arc over the subsequent seasons, you'll see that's not the case. At least I hope so.” https://www.vanityfair.com/hollywood/2019/05/bryan-cogman-game-of-thrones?srsltid=AfmBOooQjRVhWaEdh25VrT9Z8TgRf4f_TSsi3MBpNVZD4n9C1MbWbojf

Speaking about shooting the controversial scene, Turner told Vanity Fair: “You see Bryan standing there, crying and wanting to hug you, he did that often. He was the one that held me afterwards and we both cried together. He's apologizing because he wrote the scene. It was kind of beautiful. It felt like I was safe and not exploited in any way because I was with him. He's always been something of a protector, so it's really special to have him there.” https://www.vanityfair.com/hollywood/2019/05/bryan-cogman-game-of-thrones?srsltid=AfmBOooQjRVhWaEdh25VrT9Z8TgRf4f_TSsi3MBpNVZD4n9C1MbWbojf

However, in other ways, the episode veers back to book canon: "Whereas Loras’ arrest suggested the show was replacing Margaery's alleged dalliances with his homosexuality, here the show gradually builds to Margaery's arrest for lying on her brother's behalf."

=== Filming ===
"Unbowed, Unbent, Unbroken" was directed by Jeremy Podeswa. He also directed the previous episode, "Kill the Boy".

== Reception ==
=== Ratings ===
"Unbowed, Unbent, Unbroken" was watched by 6.24 million American viewers during its first airing. With Live+7 DVR viewing factored in, the episode had an overall rating of 8.79 million viewers, and a 4.5 in the 18-49 demographic. In the United Kingdom, the episode was viewed by 2.285 million viewers, making it the highest-rated broadcast that week. It also received 0.126 million timeshift viewers.

=== Critical reviews and controversy ===
The episode received polarized reviews from critics. On Rotten Tomatoes, the episode received a 54% approval rating from 50 critics with a rating average of 7.55 out of 10, the lowest of any episode in the series at that time. The critical consensus states: "Unbalanced storytelling and unnecessary, excessive brutality add up to disturbing viewing, although 'Unbowed, Unbent, Unbroken' still includes enough plot revelations to offer hope for future episodes." The majority of professional criticism concerned the decision to have Ramsay rape Sansa on their wedding night, with most critics describing the scene as gratuitous and artistically unnecessary. "This grim scene was difficult for the show to justify," said Charlotte Runcie of The Daily Telegraph. Joanna Robinson of Vanity Fair added, "this rape scene undercuts all the agency that’s been growing in Sansa since the end of last season. [...] I’d never advocate that Game of Thrones (or any work of fiction) shy away from edgy plots out of fear of pushback or controversy. But edgy plots should always accomplish something above pure titillation or shock value and what, exactly, was accomplished here?" Christopher Orr wrote in The Atlantic, "I continue to be astonished that showrunners Benioff and Weiss still apparently believe that their tendency to ramp up the sex, violence, and—especially—sexual violence of George R.R. Martin’s source material is a strength rather than the defining weakness of their adaptation." Myles McNutt of The A.V. Club wrote, "The issue with the show returning to rape as a trope is not simply because there have been thinkpieces speaking out against it, and is not solely driven by the rational concerns lying at the heart of those thinkpieces. It’s also that the show has lost my faith as a viewer." Writers from Vanity Fair, The Mary Sue and The Daily Beast all disapproved of the decision to use Sansa's victimization as a motivating agent for Theon, saying that the scene undermined Sansa's character development: "Was it really important to make that scene about Theon's pain?" wrote Joanna Robinson of Vanity Fair.

Other critics responded positively to the scene. Sean T. Collins of Rolling Stone wrote: "[B]y involving a multidimensional main character instead of one introduced primarily to suffer, the series has a chance to grant this story the gravity and seriousness it deserves". Sarah Hughes of The Guardian wrote: "I have repeatedly made clear that I’m not a fan of rape as a plot device – but the story of Ramsay and Sansa’s wedding was more than that. [...] The writers are walking a very fine line here. They handled it well tonight, telling a gothic tale of innocence sacrificed". Alyssa Rosenberg of The Washington Post wrote that the scene "managed to maintain a fine balance, employing a dignity and care for the experiences of victims that Game of Thrones has not always demonstrated."

Some critics questioned why this scene in particular should generate outrage when similar scenes have not. Sara Stewart of the New York Post pointed out that the rape and sexual abuse of both female and male characters is typical for Game of Thrones: "Why are we suddenly so outraged about the rape of Sansa Stark, when this show has served up a steady diet of sexual assault and violence against women since its first season began?" Cathy Young of Reason magazine, writing in Time noted what she calls a lack of complaint in response to the sexual mistreatment of male characters in earlier seasons, specifically the literal emasculation of Theon Greyjoy and the sexual assault of Gendry.

Criticism of the scene has not extended to the quality of the acting. Joanna Robinson of Vanity Fair wrote, "And if we can say one positive thing about that scene it's that [Alfie] Allen nailed his performance. Theon's horror mirrored our own and the camera—focusing on his reaction—let our minds fill in the blanks." Sophie Turner defended the scene as an artistic challenge for herself as an actor, saying, "When I read that scene, I kinda loved it. I love the way Ramsay had Theon watching. It was all so messed up. It’s also so daunting for me to do it. [...] I think it's going to be the most challenging season for me so far, just because it's so emotional for her. It’s not just crying all the time, like seasons 2 or 3, it’s super messed up." Iwan Rheon (Ramsay Bolton) agreed, referring to Turner's performances this season as "absolutely amazing."

Some viewers, including U.S. Senator Claire McCaskill, announced that they would stop watching the show because of this scene. According to Business Insider, this scene and increased use of streaming services are likely reasons why ratings dropped from 6.2 million viewers for this episode to 5.4 million for the next episode, "The Gift". However, there is some question as to how much of this drop is attributable to its Memorial Day weekend air date. Rebecca Martin of Wetpaint maintains that the air date was probably the only reason for the decrease in ratings.

=== Awards and nominations ===
Year	Award	Category	Nominee(s)	Result	Ref.
2015	Primetime Emmy Award	Outstanding Directing for a Drama Series	Jeremy Podeswa	Nominated	
2015	Primetime Creative Arts Emmy Awards	Outstanding Cinematography for a Single-Camera Series	Gregory Middleton	Nominated	
2015	Primetime Creative Arts Emmy Awards	Outstanding Production Design for a Fantasy Program	Deborah Riley, Paul Ghirardani, Rob Cameron	Won	
2016	ADG Excellence in Production Design Award	One-Hour Single Camera Fantasy Television Series	Deborah Riley	Won	
2016	Canadian Society of Cinematographers	TV series Cinematography	Gregory Middleton	Nominated	
