= The Gift (Game of Thrones) =

- Game of Thrones episode
- Episode no.: Season 5 Episode 7
- Directed by: Miguel Sapochnik
- Written by: David Benioff; D. B. Weiss
- Cinematography by: Fabian Wagner
- Editing by: Crispin Green
- Original air date: May 24, 2015
- Running time: 58 minutes

Guest appearances
- Diana Rigg as Olenna Tyrell; Jonathan Pryce as High Sparrow; Peter Vaughan as Maester Aemon; Owen Teale as Alliser Thorne; Ben Crompton as Edd Tollett; DeObia Oparei as Areo Hotah; Enzo Cilenti as Yezzan zo Qaggaz; Keisha Castle-Hughes as Obara Sand; Rosabell Laurenti Sellers as Tyene Sand; Jessica Henwick as Nymeria Sand; Daniel Portman as Podrick Payne; Joel Fry as Hizdahr zo Loraq; Nell Tiger Free as Myrcella Baratheon; Brenock O'Connor as Olly; Eugene Simon as Lancel Lannister; Adewale Akinnuoye-Agbaje as Malko; Hannah Waddingham as Septa Unella; Brian Fortune as Othell Yarwyck; Michael Condron as Bowen Marsh; Ian Lloyd Anderson as Derek

Episode chronology
← Previous "Unbowed, Unbent, Unbroken"	Next → "Hardhome"
- Game of Thrones season 5

"The Gift" is the seventh episode of the fifth season of HBO's medieval fantasy television series Game of Thrones, and the 47th overall. The episode was directed by Miguel Sapochnik, his directorial debut for the series, and written by series co-creators David Benioff and D. B. Weiss. It first aired on May 24, 2015.

The episode received positive reviews from critics, mainly praising the scenes in Meereen and the final scene, and achieved a viewership of 5.5 million during its initial airing in the United States. For her performance in the episode as Olenna Tyrell, Diana Rigg received a nomination for Outstanding Guest Actress in a Drama Series at the 67th Primetime Emmy Awards. This episode marks the final appearance for Peter Vaughan (Maester Aemon).

== Plot ==
=== At the Wall ===
Jon and Tormund leave for Hardhome. Before they leave, Sam gives Jon a bag of dragonglass weapons, reminding him of their use against the White Walkers.

Sam and Gilly visit Maester Aemon, who dies in the night. Gilly is attacked by two brothers. Sam attempts to intervene and is badly beaten before Ghost scares them off. Gilly tends to Sam and the two finally consummate their relationship.

=== In the North ===
Sansa, whom Ramsay has imprisoned in her bedchamber, asks Reek to signal for help, but instead he tells Ramsay. Ramsay flays the maid from whom Sansa learned the signal, and takes Sansa to look on her body. During the encounter, she also learns that Jon has become Lord Commander and discreetly steals a corkscrew.

Stannis' troops are trapped at their camp by a snowstorm. Davos suggests returning to Castle Black to wait out the winter, but Stannis refuses to waver. Melisandre assures Stannis that she saw a vision of his victory in the snow, and asks for permission to sacrifice Shireen to R'hllor. Stannis refuses.

=== In Meereen ===
Daenerys and Daario discuss her pending marriage to Hizdahr zo Loraq.

Jorah and Tyrion are sold to a slaver, Yezzan, who is looking for fighters for the reopening of the fighting pits. While fighting in front of Daenerys, Jorah reveals himself and tells her he brought her a gift: Tyrion.

=== In Dorne ===
Myrcella is brought to speak with Jaime, and asks why he came to take her back to King's Landing, when what she wants is to stay and marry Trystane.

In the cells, Tyene taunts Bronn by exposing her breasts to him, before explaining that her daggers, with which he'd been cut during their fight, had been coated with a slow-acting poison that would activate when his heart rate increased. Tyene gives him the antidote after he gives in to her request that he call her the most beautiful woman in the world.

=== In King's Landing ===
Olenna demands the High Sparrow release Loras and Margaery, but the High Sparrow insists that the laws of the Faith be applied to everyone equally. Olenna meets Littlefinger and confronts him for giving Cersei information implicating Loras. Threatened with his involvement in King Joffrey's assassination being exposed, Littlefinger placates her by declaring that he can implicate Cersei, too.

In the Red Keep, Tommen anguishes over his inability to help Margaery. Cersei halfheartedly speaks with the High Sparrow to advocate for Margaery and Loras's release, but to her shock, he has her imprisoned as well.

== Production ==
=== Writing ===
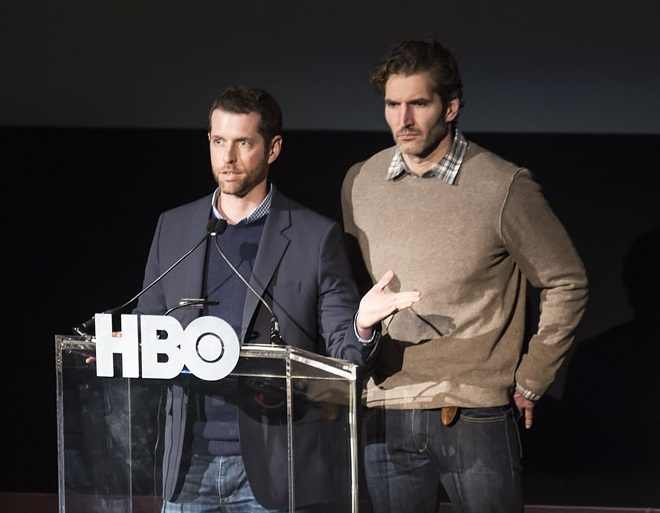
The episode was written by series co-creators David Benioff and D. B. Weiss.

This episode was written by David Benioff and D. B. Weiss, the series' creators. It contains content from George R. R. Martin's novels A Feast for Crows, chapters Samwell II, Samwell IV, and Cersei X and A Dance with Dragons, chapters The King's Prize, Tyrion X, and Daenerys IV.

Like other episodes in season 5, this episode differed considerably from Martin's novels in places. Aemon's death takes place at Castle Black rather than at sea, which Myles McNutt of The A.V. Club notes, "establish[es] a shifting of the guard at Castle Black and marking Sam’s reemergence as a more significant character." In what Sara Stewart of the New York Post calls "the biggest departure yet from the books," Tyrion actually meets Daenerys at the end of the episode, which has yet to happen as of A Dance with Dragons. The decision was largely approved by critics from The Atlantic and other publications. David Benioff cited the television adaptation's faster pace as part of the rationale behind this decision.

=== Directing ===
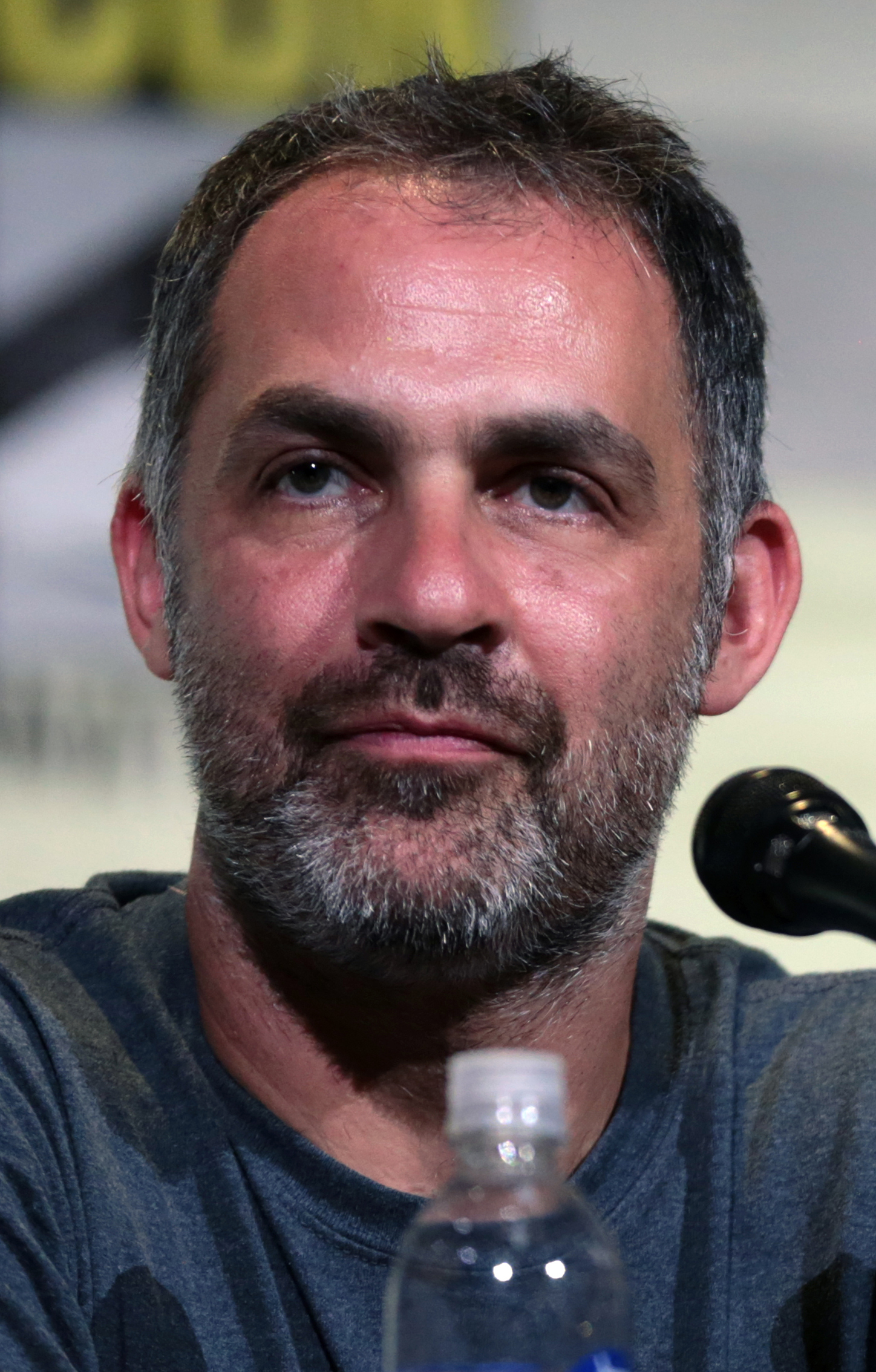
Miguel Sapochnik served as director for the episode, his first episode for the series.

"The Gift" was directed by Miguel Sapochnik. It was his first time being a director for Game of Thrones; he also directed the subsequent episode, "Hardhome".

== Reception ==
=== Ratings ===
"The Gift" was watched by 5.5 million and a 2.5 in the key 18–49 demographic during its first airing. This is significantly fewer viewers than the previous episode, "Unbowed, Unbent, Unbroken", which had an audience of 6.2 million. According to Business Insider, likely causes for the lower ratings include backlash from the rape scene in "Unbowed, Unbent, Unbroken", in response to which many fans announced they would stop watching the show, and increased use of streaming through HBO Now. Rebecca Martin of Wetpaint, however, maintains that the Memorial Day weekend air date was probably the only reason for the decrease in ratings. The season two episode "Blackwater", which also aired on Memorial Day weekend, also suffered a notable drop in ratings. Whatever the reason, the ratings for the episode immediately after "The Gift", "Hardhome", were higher than those of either "The Gift" or "Unbowed, Unbent, Unbroken". With Live+7 DVR viewing factored in, the episode had an overall rating of 8.87 million viewers, and a 4.5 in the 18–49 demographic.

In the United Kingdom, the episode was viewed by 2.293 million viewers, making it the highest-rated broadcast that week. It also received 0.176 million timeshift viewers.

=== Critical reception ===
The episode received positive reviews. It scored 84% on Rotten Tomatoes from 50 reviews with an average rating of 7.59 out of 10 and the consensus reading: "'The Gift' is a jam-packed installment that delivers long-awaited plot turns in a satisfying manner, even though it continues a disturbing theme from the previous episode." Erik Kain of Forbes called this a "terrific, exciting, tense episode," though, like Myles McNutt of The A.V. Club, he questioned both the "anemic" Dorne storyline and the gratuitousness of Tyene exposing her breasts in the prison scene.

=== Awards and nominations ===
Year	Award	Category	Nominee(s)	Result	Ref.
2015	Primetime Emmy Awards	Outstanding Guest Actress in a Drama Series	Diana Rigg as Lady Olenna Tyrell	Nominated	
