= Bill Maher: Live from D.C. =

2014 stand-up comedy special by Bill Maher

- Genre: Stand-up comedy
- Written by: Bill Maher
- Starring: Bill Maher
- Country of origin: United States
- Original language: English

Original release
- Network: HBO
- Release: 2014

Bill Maher: Live From D.C. is the American comedian and personality Bill Maher's tenth HBO stand-up comedy special.

It was broadcast live on September 12, 2014, from the Warner Theater in Washington, D.C., immediately after broadcast of an episode of Real Time with Bill Maher from Sidney Harman Hall in Washington. Maher was given a police escort to the theater; his journey was commentated on by Michael Moore and Keith Olbermann.

Maher covered political and social topics such as the midterm elections, religion, U.S. President Barack Obama, the Republican psyche and his legal battle with Donald Trump.

The special is noted for being HBO's most watched comedy special in the five years to 2014, with 1.1 million viewers watching at 10:00 PM.
