= Bryan Cogman =

American television writer and producer

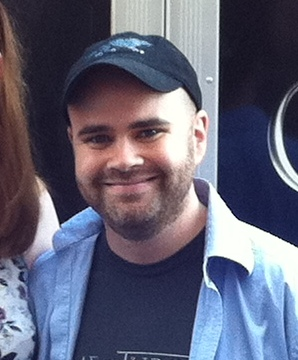
- Born: July 25, 1979 (age 47); Oklahoma City, Oklahoma, U.S.
- Education: Juilliard School (BFA)
- Occupations: Television writer, television producer

Robert Bryan Cogman (born July 25, 1979) is an American television writer and producer. He wrote eleven episodes of the HBO series Game of Thrones.

He is also the author of the book Inside HBO's Game of Thrones which features a preface by A Song of Ice and Fire author George R. R. Martin.

== Early life ==
Cogman was born in Oklahoma City, and moved to the Washington, D.C. area when his father became Chief of Staff to U.S. Senator Dewey Bartlett.

He attended Winston Churchill High School in Potomac, Maryland, a suburb of Washington, DC. He was in the class of 1997.

He was educated at the Juilliard School and graduated with a BFA in Acting, class of 2001. Juilliard classmates included Lee Pace, Anthony Mackie, Tracie Thoms, and Steven Boyer.

After graduating from Juilliard, "spent the next decade working on his acting career, with little to show for it". Unable to get consistent work as an actor, he sold printer cartridges on the side to pay rent.

== Career ==
Bryan Cogman eventually became a writer for HBO's Game of Thrones. His wife was working as a nanny for David Benioff, at the same time that Cogman was working on a pilot pitch script for a project that never materialized. Benioff agreed to read over Cogman's script, and was impressed enough that he hired him as a personal assistant. Benioff began working with Cogman and got him a job as a writer's assistant on NBC's My Own Worst Enemy. The show only lasted nine episodes, but the same day it was cancelled, HBO officially picked up Game of Thrones with David Benioff as co-showrunner. Benioff hired Cogman as his personal assistant, copy-editing scripts in the first season, but then abruptly promoted him to be the official writer for the fourth episode. Cogman remained a staff writer for the rest of the show's run.

In 2014, Cogman was hired by 20th Century Fox to write a feature film based on characters and stories from Magic: The Gathering, a popular fantasy trading card game.

Cogman gave an interview with ThinkProgress in 2012.

In 2015, it was announced he would pen the live-action remake of The Sword in the Stone for Disney.

In 2016, he made a cameo on It's Always Sunny in Philadelphia episode "The Gang Goes to Hell: Part Two", as the Insurance Adjuster.

In September 2017, Cogman was announced as a creator of a developing fifth Game of Thrones prequel series. In April 2019, Cogman confirmed that this potential series would not be moving forward.

In May 2019, George R. R. Martin mentioned on his blog that Cogman would be helping Amazon Video with their new The Lord of the Rings series. More recently, he signed a deal with Entertainment One.

In March 2023, Cogman was announced as the series showrunner for the Disney+ television adaptation of Zorro with Wilmer Valderrama set to star. In June 2026 Cogman wrote "Alas, my version of 'Zorro' is longer happening at Disney. They just didn't see eye-to-eye with what we wanted to do with it. Wilmer and I hope to find another home for it someday.

Thankfully, I have another show picking up speed (hence my imminent social media break). But, yeah, it's a bummer."

== Filmography ==
=== Television ===
Year	Title	Writer	Producer	Actor	Notes
2011–2019	Game of Thrones	Yes	Yes	Yes	Wrote: 11 episodes Dragonstone waiter (uncredited cameo in "The Lion and the Rose"); Primetime Emmy Award for Outstanding Drama Series (2015–2016, 2018–2019); Hugo Award for Best Dramatic Presentation, Long Form (2012); Producers Guild of America Award for Best Episodic Drama (2015); Nominated—Writers Guild of America Award for Dramatic Series (2011–2012, 2014–2016); Nominated—Producers Guild of America Award for Best Episodic Drama (2016, 2018); Nominated—Writers Guild of America Award for Dramatic Series (2017)
2016	It's Always Sunny in Philadelphia	No	No	Yes	Episode: "The Gang Goes to Hell: Part Two"; Insurance Adjuster
2022	The Lord of the Rings: The Rings of Power	No	Yes	No	Consulting producer

=== Film ===
- Haunted Mansion (2023), Additional literary material
