= Music of Game of Thrones =

Medley of remixed Game of Thrones music from the video game MultiVersus

The music for the fantasy TV series Game of Thrones is composed by Ramin Djawadi. The music is primarily non-diegetic and instrumental with occasional vocal performances, and is created to support musically the characters and plots of the show. It features various themes, the most prominent being the "main title theme" that accompanies the series' title sequence. In every season, a soundtrack album was released. The music for the show has won a number of awards, including a Primetime Emmy Award for Outstanding Music Composition for a Series in 2018 and 2019.

A series of concerts which featured Game of Thrones music, Game of Thrones Live Concert Experience with composer Ramin Djawadi, took place in 2017–2018. First to be performed in Saint Paul, Minnesota, it then went on to tour across the United States, Canada and Europe. This is followed by a world tour starting May 2018 in Madrid.

The music of Game of Thrones has inspired many cover versions; the main title theme is particularly popular. There are also decidedly non-medieval renditions of songs from the series's source novels by indie bands. These adaptations, according to Wired, create attention for the series in media that wouldn't normally cover it, but are also notable for their musical merits independent of the series.

== Background ==
Initially a different composer, Stephen Warbeck, was hired for the pilot episode of Game of Thrones but he left the project. The music consultant for HBO and music supervisor of Game of Thrones Evyen Klean then suggested Ramin Djawadi to David Benioff and D. B. Weiss. Djawadi, although initially interested, declined the offer three days later as the schedule conflicted with a film project he was working on. However, after a few meetings, Djawadi was persuaded to take on the project. The showrunners Benioff and Weiss sent Djawadi the first two episodes of the series, which impressed Djawadi. He arranged a meeting with Benioff and Weiss to discuss the concept of the series, after which he began to compose the music for the series.

According to Djawadi, Benioff and Weiss were interested in using music to support the different characters and plots. They wanted the music to express the emotion and mood of each scene in the series, and that distinct themes should be created for the main characters. Benioff and Weiss also wanted a soundscape that is distinct from other productions in the fantasy genre, therefore flutes and solo vocals were initially avoided. Cello became a prominent feature of the music of Game of Thrones, notably in its title theme.

=== Composition and recording ===
The process of composition was essentially the same throughout the series. Once the filming was nearly completed, episodes were sent to Djawadi either singly or in batches of multiple episodes as they were being edited together but often before any special effects added to the footage. Benioff and Weiss would also inform Djawadi in advance of the need to expand a theme or create new themes for characters. Djawadi wrote all the music in Santa Monica, California. Asked in an interview about the overall process of composing the music and how it was used in the series, Djawadi said: "I sit with David and Dan and we do what's called a spotting session where we watch the entire episode and then discuss when music should start and stop. Everybody's very involved with that. And it constantly gets played with. What I love about Game of Thrones is that the positioning of the music is so well done, because it's not overdone. When the music cuts in, it really has something to say."

The recordings of most of the soundtracks were conducted in Prague with The Czech Film Orchestra and Choir. Djawadi interacted with the orchestra over the internet and was present during the entire recording session, giving comments on the recordings via the internet.

== Themes ==
=== Main Title ===
According to Djawadi, the series creators wanted the main title theme that accompanies the Game of Thrones title sequence to be about a journey as there are many locations, characters in the series and involves much traveling. After Djawadi had seen the preliminary animated title sequence the visual effect artists were still working on, he was inspired to write the piece. Djawadi said he intended to capture the overall impression of the series with the theme tune. The title theme is unusually long for a television series at nearly two minutes long, and cello was chosen as the main instrument for the music as he thought it has a "darker sound" that suited the series. The main title theme may also be incorporated into other music segments within the show, particularly at climactic moments.

=== Houses and characters ===
Djawadi composed an individual leitmotif or theme for each of the major houses, as well as for some locations and some characters. These themes are often played in scenes involving them and they can be used to tell a story. Not all characters would have their own themes due to the large number of characters in the series. The theme for House Stark is the first theme to be composed and it is played on a cello. Most of the Stark characters only have variations on the same theme on cello. Arya Stark is the first of the house to have her own theme, first heard when she started her lesson on swordplay in episode three of season one, with the music featuring a hammered dulcimer. A new theme for Jon Snow, previously using only the House Stark theme, was created in the sixth season and prominently featured in the episode "Battle of the Bastards". It was first heard at the end of episode three when he said "My watch is ended", signifying a shift in the character after he had been resurrected.

Due to the large number of themes, the introductions of different themes are also deliberately spaced over a longer period so as not to confuse the audience, for example, the theme for Theon Greyjoy or House Greyjoy was not introduced until the second season even though he first appeared in the first season. House Lannister has an associated song, "The Rains of Castamere", which became their theme. The song was played at the Red Wedding, but first heard when Tyrion Lannister whistled a small part in the first episode of the second season. When a theme has become established, different versions that are darker or lighter are then introduced, and concepts such as honor and conspiracy are also represented in themes.

Djawadi chose distinctive sounds and instruments for different leitmotifs and themes, for example, didgeridoos are used for the wildlings, while the Armenian duduk flute is used for the Dothrakis. The duduk flute has a different sound from other flutes, which were deliberately avoided as they are frequently used in other fantasy films. The themes for the White Walkers and the Night King are more of sound designs rather than regular themes; the White Walker theme initially employed a glass harmonica for a "really high, eerie, icy sound", but became fully orchestral when the army of the dead was revealed in the season two finale. The theme for the White Walkers extended over time into the music of the Army of the Dead, representing the gathering strength of Army of the Dead, which was only introduced in full in the finale of the seventh season when the Wall fell.

The themes may evolve over time in the series. The theme for Daenerys Targaryen starts small, but becomes grander as she grows more powerful. Her theme is initially played with a single instrument such as a processed cello, but later more instruments, including Japanese taiko-inspired drums, Indonesian bedug drums, and an Armenian duduk flute are incorporated. Syllables and words in Valyrian, a fictional language of Game of Thrones, are also used in her theme music, although not as whole sentences. The instrumentation for her theme are also used for dragon attacks. For the dragons, the theme is first heard when they hatched at the end of season one as a quiet high-pitched melody, but develops into something more powerful by the time they become fully grown, for example it is played with French horns in the loot train attack scene in the seventh season.

Different themes may also be combined in some themes and scenes. For example, in Season 5, the music for House of Black and White is an extension from the themes for Arya and Jaqen H'ghar. During the first scene of the fourth season, as Ice, the Stark sword, is reforged by Tywin Lannister, the Starks' and Lannisters' themes are clearly played simultaneously, to finally end with the Lannister theme only. In the finale of Season 6 with the shot of the armada at the end, at least five themes are combined – themes for Daenerys, Theon, the Unsullied, the dragons, and the main title.

=== List of themes ===
Houses

- House Baratheon ("The King's Arrival")
- House Bolton ("Reek", "Let's Play a Game")
- House Greyjoy ("What Is Dead May Never Die", "Ironborn")
- House Lannister ("A Lannister Always Pays His Debts", "The Rains of Castamere")
- House Martell ("Unbowed, Unbent, Unbroken", "Jaws of the Viper")
- House Stark ("Goodbye Brother", "Home", "The Last of the Starks", "King of the North")
- House Targaryen ("Fire and Blood", "Breaker of Chains", "Dragonstone")
- House Tyrell ("Service of the Gods")

Groups

- Army of the Dead ("The Army of the Dead")
- Children of the Forest ("He Is Lost")
- Daenerys' Army ("Dracarys", "The Winds of Winter", "Shall We Begin?", "Casterly Rock")
- Dothraki ("To Vaes Dothrak")
- Dragons ("Breaker of Chains", "Blood of the Dragon")
- The Living ("The Night King")
- Night's Watch ("The Night's Watch")
- Red Priests ("Warrior of Light", "The Red Woman")
- Sons of the Harpy ("Son of the Harpy")
- Thenns ("Thenns", "Let's Kill Some Crows")
- The Undying ("Pyat Pree")
- White Walkers ("White Walkers")
- Wildlings ("We Are the Watchers on the Wall")

Characters (with themes different from their House theme)

- Arya Stark ("The Pointy End", "Needle", "The Children")
- Cersei Lannister ("Light of the Seven", "Hear Me Roar", "No One Walks Away from Me", "For Cersei")
- Daenerys Targaryen ("Love in the Eyes", "Finale", "Mhysa", "Khaleesi")
- Euron Greyjoy ("Coronation")
- High Sparrow ("High Sparrow")
- Jaime Lannister ("Kingslayer")
- Jaqen H'ghar ("Valar Morghulis")
- Joffrey Baratheon ("You Win or You Die")
- Jon Snow ("My Watch Has Ended", "Bastard")
- The Mountain ("I Choose Violence")
- Three-Eyed Raven ("Three-Eyed Raven")
- Samwell Tarly ("Maester")
- Stannis Baratheon ("Warrior of Light", "Don't Die With a Clean Sword")
- Melisandre ("The Red Woman")
- The Night King ("The Night King")
- Brienne of Tarth ("A Knight of the Seven Kingdoms")

Locations

- The Citadel ("Maester")
- House of Black and White ("Valar Morghulis", "House of Black and White")
- Meereen ("Mereen")
- Qarth ("Qarth")
- The Wall ("The Wall")
- Winterfell ("Winterfell")

Couples

- Daenerys and Khal Drogo ("Love in the Eyes", same melody as the Daenerys' personal theme)
- Daenerys and Jon Snow ("See You for What You Are", "Truth", "Be With Me", "Stay a Thousand Years")
- Greyworm and Missandei ("I'm Sorry for Today")
- Jon Snow and Ygritte ("You Know Nothing", "The Real North")

Other

- Conspiracy ("Await the King's Justice", "Chaos Is a Ladder", "The Dagger")
- Honor ("Black of Hair", "The Old Gods and the New", "A Knight of the Seven Kingdoms")
- The Long Night ("The Night King", "Farewell")
- Love/Marriage ("I Am Hers, She Is Mine", "Before the Old Gods", "The White Book")
- Royal/The Iron Throne ("The King's Arrival", "First of His Name", "Arrival at Winterfell")

== Other compositions and songs ==
Various pieces of music are also composed for particular plot lines in the series. A notable piece is the "Light of the Seven", which is played at the beginning of the final episode of season 6, "The Winds of Winter". This piece, which is over nine minutes long, is unusual in its choice of piano as that instrument had not been used before on the series. Additionally, such long pieces are seldom used, although in season 6 soundtracks cover a 10-minute section in the Hodor scenes in "The Door" episode and a 22-minute sequence in the "Battle of the Bastards" episode.

Djawadi composed a number of songs for the show using lyrics from the books A Song of Ice and Fire, the most prominent of which is "The Rains of Castamere". The National recorded the song in the season 2, and Sigur Rós recorded it in season 4 for a cameo appearance. In season 3, Gary Lightbody appeared in a cameo amongst other captors of Brienne of Tarth and Jaime Lannister in season 3 episode 4 to sing "The Bear and the Maiden Fair", and a recording of the song performed by The Hold Steady was played over that episode's closing credits. The same season Kerry Ingram, who played the character Shireen Baratheon, sang "It's Always Summer Under the Sea". The character Bronn, played by Jerome Flynn, sang "The Dornishman's Wife" in season 5, and Ed Sheeran appeared in a cameo to perform "Hands of Gold" composed by Ramin Djawadi in season 7. However, neither of the latter two songs was used in the soundtrack albums.

In season 8, Daniel Portman who played the character Podrick Payne sang "Jenny of Oldstones" a song from the book A Storm of Swords but with additional lyrics by David Benioff and Dan Weiss and composer Ramin Djawadi providing the music. The full version of the song titled "Jenny of Oldstones" was sung by Florence Welch, and played over the closing credits of the second episode "A Knight of the Seven Kingdoms". It was released as a single of Florence + the Machine.

== House of the Dragon ==
It was announced in September 2022 that Ramin Djawadi will compose the series score. Djawadi composed the music for all eight seasons of Game of Thrones which garnered him three Grammy Awards nominations and two Emmy Awards wins. Djawadi, along with the showrunners, decided to keep the original theme song, "Game of Thrones Theme", which was first featured in the second episode of House of the Dragon. In an interview with The A.V. Club, Djawadi stated that the original theme song was used in order to "tie the shows together". For the first season, Djawadi, along with Condal and Sapochnik, watched each episode and made notes on when the music should occur and what mood the music should set. Character motifs from Game of Thrones are also featured in House of the Dragon, including the Dragon theme "Dracarys".

As similar to Game of Thrones, the cello was used as the primary instruments in House of the Dragon. However, Djawadi made minor adjustments on the instrumentation, which he referred as the total instrumental swap, on comparing the musical identities with the two series. He did not use the solo violin, but used the viola, which had "a little bit lower in range and different timbre". He used newer instruments, such as the bamboo flutes and woodwinds, alongside multiple instruments. Djawadi wanted to "push the cello up into the violin range [because] there is a thickness to it up higher than the violin and I like that sound. It's the same with the viola — obviously the viola can play lower than the violin, but even if the viola plays higher, it has a different timbre."

In the fifth episode, during Rhaenyra's pre-wedding dance sequence, Djawadi said that the music was written even before the shooting had started, as "the music had to be there first so they could choreograph the dancing to it". Hence, he read the script and discussed on how the scene comes to fruition. Djawadi said "We have the drums, and it's just maybe not what you'd expect of wedding music—tribal isn't the right word, but the percussive element, there's definitely a strong background of that there. So it was fun to write it and see how they shot the scene to it. And then later it turns into score, obviously, when it all goes crazy, but I think there were three pieces I had to write before. So they were written, like, over a year ago." He also mentioned Rhaenys' grand entrance during the coronation as one of his "favorite musical moments of the show so far", where the scene transitioned from "celebration mode to pure chaos in an instant" and the music syncs as Alicent's eyes close. He also included the main title theme in the concluding moments, which he did with the balance of sound effects.

=== List of themes ===
Houses

- House Targaryen ("The Heirs of the Dragon", "Reign of the Targaryens", "Aemond Rides Vhagar"; reprise of the Targaryen theme from "Game of Thrones")
- House Velaryon ("House Velaryon", "This is Our Purpose"; reprise of "It's Always Summer Under the Sea" from "Game of Thrones")

Characters (with themes different from their House theme)

- Aemond Targaryen ("Aemond Rides Vhagar", "Bloodlines Will Burn", "There Will Be No Mercy")
- Alicent Hightower 1 ("The Green Dress", "Fate of the Kingdoms", "Interests of the Realm")
- Alicent Hightower 2 ("Bear the Burden Alone")
- Daemon Targaryen 1 ("The Rogue Prince")
- Daemon Targaryen 2 ("Indulge in Darkness")
- Mysaria ("The Whisper Network", "Patience and Restraint")
- Rhaenyra Targaryen 1 ("Rhaenyra's Welcome", "Daemon and Rhaenyra", "Right to Grieve")
- Rhaenyra Targaryen 2 ("The Power of Prophecy", "Sealed in Fire and Blood", "The Whisper Network")
- Viserys Targaryen ("An Impossible Choice", "Protector of the Realm", "Lament")

Other

- Conspiracy/The Greens ("Pass Judgement", "Fate of the Kingdoms", "Interests of the Realm", "The Feeling of Betrayal")
- Dance of Dragons ("End a War Before It Begins", "Rook's Rest, Pt.1", "All Must Choose")
- Death ("Funeral by the Sea", "The Silent Sisters", "Remembering Those Who Came Before")
- Love ("Whatever May Come", "Destiny")
- The Prince That Was Promised ("The Prince That Was Promised", "The Language of Girls", "The Promise", "Fight for Our Queen")
- Royal/The Iron Throne ("Protector of the Realm", "Coronation"; reprise of the royal theme from "Game of Thrones")

== A Knight of the Seven Kingdoms ==
It was announced in October 2025, that long time Game of Thrones composer, Ramin Djawadi will not return for the prequel, A Knight of the Seven Kingdoms and that Dan Romer will take over scoring duties.

== Releases ==
In every season, a soundtrack album of the music used in that season was released toward the end of the season. The first two were released by Varèse Sarabande, while all subsequent releases were by WaterTower Music. Mixtapes were also released in 2014 and 2015 before the start of the fourth and fifth season respectively and they were available as free downloads to promote the season.

=== Soundtracks ===
Year	Title	Composer	Ref(s)
2011	Game of Thrones: Season 1	Ramin Djawadi	
2012	Game of Thrones: Season 2	Ramin Djawadi	
2013	Game of Thrones: Season 3	Ramin Djawadi	
2014	Game of Thrones: Season 4	Ramin Djawadi	
2015	Game of Thrones: Season 5	Ramin Djawadi	
2016	Game of Thrones: Season 6	Ramin Djawadi	
2017	Game of Thrones: Season 7	Ramin Djawadi	
2019	Game of Thrones: Season 8	Ramin Djawadi	
2022	House of the Dragon: Season 1	Ramin Djawadi	

=== Tie-in album ===
A companion album, For the Throne: Music Inspired by the HBO Series Game of Thrones, comprising songs that are inspired by the show but not featured in it. A single, "Power Is Power" by SZA, The Weeknd and Travis Scott, was released as the lead single from the album. The title of the song quotes a line spoken by Cersei.

Year	Title	Artist	Ref(s)
2019	For the Throne: Music Inspired by the HBO Series Game of Thrones	Various	

=== Mixtapes ===
Year	Title	Artist	Ref(s)
2014	Catch the Throne: Volume I	Various	
2015	Catch the Throne: Volume II	Various	

== Tours ==
A concert tour featuring the music of Game of Thrones was produced in 2017. The tour involved an 80-piece orchestra, a choir, and seven custom 360-degree stages. Instruments were specially created for the tour, such as a 12-foot Wildling horn played during the Wildling attack on the Wall section. A world tour was also arranged for cities in Europe and North America in 2018, with new music from season 7 added.

== Awards ==
=== Awards and nominations ===
Year	Award	Category	Nominee(s)	Result	Ref.
2011	International Film Music Critics Association	Best Original Score for a Television Series		Nominated	
2012	ASCAP Awards	Top Television Series		Won	
2013	ASCAP Awards	Top Television Series		Won	
2013	International Film Music Critics Association	Best Original Score for a Television Series		Nominated	
2014	66th Primetime Creative Arts Emmy Awards	Outstanding Music Composition for a Series (Original Dramatic Score)	Episode: "The Mountain and the Viper"	Nominated	
2014	Hollywood Music in Media Awards	Best Original Score – TV Show/Digital Streaming Series		Nominated	
2016	World Soundtrack Awards	Television Composer of the Year	Ramin Djawadi	Nominated	
2016	International Film Music Critics Association	Best Original Score for a Television Series		Won	
2016	International Film Music Critics Association	Film Music Composition of the Year	Song: "Light of the Seven"	Nominated	
2018	60th Annual Grammy Awards	Best Score Soundtrack for Visual Media	Game of Thrones: Season 7	Nominated	
2018	70th Primetime Creative Arts Emmy Awards	Outstanding Music Composition for a Series (Original Dramatic Score)	Episode: "The Dragon and the Wolf"	Won	
2019	71st Primetime Creative Arts Emmy Awards	Outstanding Music Composition for a Series (Original Dramatic Score)	Episode: "The Long Night"	Won	
2020	62nd Annual Grammy Awards	Best Score Soundtrack for Visual Media	Game of Thrones: Season 8	Nominated	

== See also ==
- For the Throne: Music Inspired by the HBO Series Game of Thrones (2019)
- For other music based on the A Song of Ice and Fire novels, see Works based on A Song of Ice and Fire.
- 'The Rains of Castamere': medievalism, popular culture, and the music of Game of Thrones
