= Game of Thrones: Season 6 (soundtrack) =

Soundtrack album by Ramin Djawadi
- Released: June 24, 2016
- Genre: Soundtrack
- Length: 72:16
- Label: WaterTower Music
- Producer: Ramin Djawadi

Ramin Djawadi soundtrack chronology
| Warcraft (2016) | Game of Thrones: Season 6 (2016) | Westworld: Season 1 (2016) |

Singles from Game of Thrones: Season 6
- 1. "Light of the Seven" Released: June 24, 2016

The soundtrack album of the sixth season of HBO series Game of Thrones, titled Game of Thrones: Season 6, was released digitally on June 24, 2016, and later released on CD on July 29, 2016. "Light of the Seven" is the first time piano is used in the music for Game of Thrones. The album was composed by Ramin Djawadi. The soundtrack has received favorable reviews and peaked at number 1 on the US Billboard Soundtrack Albums chart and number 27 on the US Billboard 200. The track from the season finale, "Light of the Seven", reached number 1 on Billboard's Spotify Viral 50 chart. It won an International Film Music Critics Association for Best Original Score for a Television Series.

== Reception ==
The soundtrack received positive reviews from critics.

== Track listing ==
Game of Thrones: Season 6
| No. | Title | Key scenes/Notes | Length |
|---|---|---|---|
| 1. | "Main Titles" | Used in the opening sequence. Mixed differently than in previous seasons, and it's also slightly longer. | 1:51 |
| 2. | "Blood of My Blood" | "Blood of My Blood": Daenerys flies over her Dothraki khalasar on Drogon before rallying them, telling them she chooses them all to be her bloodriders, rather than choosing a traditional three. Contains the melody of the Daenerys Targaryen theme and the main theme. | 3:35 |
| 3. | "Light of the Seven" | Cersei Lannister's theme. "The Winds of Winter": Everyone at King's Landing, from the High Sparrow to King Tommen, prepares for the trials of Cersei and Loras. While Loras is on trial, Lancel Lannister goes in the crypts and finds a large storage of wildfire. The wildfire goes off, destroying the sept and the surrounding areas. Contains hints of the main theme. | 9:49 |
| 4. | "Needle" | Arya Stark's theme. "No One": The second half plays during the closing credits. It contains the melody of Arya Stark's theme ("Valar Morghulis") and hints of "The Pointy End" and "House of Black and White". | 2:56 |
| 5. | "Coronation" | Euron Greyjoy's theme. "The Door": Euron Greyjoy is crowned King of the Iron Islands and seeks to kill Theon and Yara. "Dragonstone": Euron Greyjoy arrives with his new fleet to King's Landing to meet Cersei. Contains hints of the House Greyjoy theme ("What Is Dead May Never Die"). A longer version is used on the main menu of season 6's DVD/Blu-ray release. | 1:46 |
| 6. | "Feed the Hounds" | "The Red Woman": Sansa and Theon flee from Winterfell but find themselves cornered by Bolton soldiers and Ramsay's hounds before Brienne and Pod attack the soldiers and rescue them. Contains a melody associated with Catelyn Stark and later with Brienne of Tarth ("The Old Gods and The New"). Also contains the melody of Ramsay Bolton's theme. | 3:08 |
| 7. | "My Watch Has Ended" | Jon Snow's theme. "Oathbreaker": After being revived, Jon goes to the courtyard and is greeted by Tormund and Edd. Later, after hanging the mutineers at the Wall, Jon gives Edd his cloak and tells him Castle Black is his, before saying "My watch is ended." Contains small hints of the main theme is the opening. | 2:53 |
| 8. | "The Red Woman" | "The Red Woman": A sullen Melisandre undresses and removes her necklace to reveal her true aged appearance before going to bed. Contains the melody of Stannis' and Melisandre's theme ("Warrior of Light"). | 3:17 |
| 9. | "Hold the Door" | "The Door": The White Walkers and their army of wights attack the Three-Eyed Raven's cave. Summer and the Children of the Forest are killed attempting to hold them back. Bran wargs into Hodor while still in a vision to aid Meera escape the cave after being able to hear her cries. The Night King kills the Three-Eyed Raven and he disappears from the vision. Meera repeatedly tells Hodor to "hold the door" of the cave shut as she flees with Bran. Still able to hear Meera in the vision, Bran wargs into a young Hodor who begins to have a seizure and hears echoes of Meera's cries to the adult Hodor. He repeatedly slurs "hold the door" until "Hodor" is all he can say. Contains the melody of "He Is Lost", the House Stark theme ("Goodbye Brother"), the White Walkers' theme ("White Walkers"), and the main theme. | 7:21 |
| 10. | "Khaleesi" | "Book of the Stranger": Daenerys emerges from the Temple of the Dosh Khaleen unburnt after setting it alight with her and the gathered Dothraki khals inside. After witnessing her walk out, the Dothraki, Jorah, and Daario bow down to her. Contains the melody of the Daenerys Targaryen theme and the main theme. | 3:05 |
| 11. | "Maester" | Samwell Tarly's theme. "The Winds of Winter": Sam, Gilly and little Sam approach Oldtown, where men become maesters. "Dragonstone": Heard a few time when we see the big Library of the Citadelle for the first time in the season 7. "Eastwatch": A different version can be heard when Sam, Gilly and little Sam leave Oldtown. Contains the melody of the main theme. | 2:52 |
| 12. | "A Painless Death" | "No One": Arya is chased on foot by the Waif. She leads the Waif to a dark room with a trail of blood from the stab wounds she inflicted the day before. As the Waif closes in on her, Arya cuts the only candle lighting the room with Needle, plunging them into complete darkness. Contains a more intense version of the "House of Black and White" and the melody of Arya Stark's theme ("Valar Morghulis"). | 3:22 |
| 13. | "Reign" | "Battle of the Bastards": The Masters tell Daenerys her reign is over but she insists it's only just beginning as Drogon flies to her. She takes flight and they are joined by Rhaegal and Viserion before they burn one of the ships in the Masters' fleet together. Contains the melody of "Dracarys" and the Daenerys Targaryen theme. | 3:16 |
| 14. | "Let's Play a Game" | "Battle of the Bastards": Ramsay tells Rickon to run towards his brother's army. As he does, Ramsay fires arrows at him and Jon rides out to try and save him. Just as he reaches him, an arrow strikes Rickon through the chest and he dies. An enraged Jon charges towards Ramsay but his horse is taken down by a volley. Davos orders the Stark forces to follow him. As he faces the Bolton cavalry alone on foot, he takes out his sword and accepts his fate but just before they reach him, his own cavalry clashes with them and the battle begins. Contains the melodies of the Jon Snow theme ("My Watch Has Ended") and the Ramsay Bolton theme. | 5:51 |
| 15. | "Bastard" | "Battle of the Bastards": The Bolton forces form a phalanx around the Stark forces. Tormund and other wildlings attempt to escape by climbing over the wall of bodies trapping them in at the back only to be met by Smalljon Umber and his men. Jon is almost trampled on during the panicked men rushing to the wall of bodies but eventually manages to get to his feet. Contains the melodies of the Jon Snow theme ("My Watch Has Ended") and the House Bolton theme. | 5:05 |
| 16. | "Trust Each Other" | "Battle of the Bastards": The Knights of the Vale arrive and defeat the Bolton soldiers, rescuing the doomed Stark force, as Littlefinger, Sansa, and Ramsay watch. Ramsay retreats to Winterfell as Jon, Tormund, and Wun Wun run after him. Wun Wun force the doors of Winterfell just before taking an arrow in his eye by Ramsay Bolton, and dying. Contains the melodies of the House Stark theme ("Goodbye Brother"), the Ramsay Bolton theme, and the main theme. | 3:09 |
| 17. | "Winter Has Come" | "The Winds of Winter": Houses Mormont, Manderly, Glover, and Cerwyn, together with Ser Davos Seaworth and the Knights of the Vale swear their loyalty to Jon Snow and House Stark and declare him the King in the North. Contains the melody of the House Stark theme ("Goodbye Brother") and the main theme. | 3:14 |
| 18. | "Hear Me Roar" | "The Winds of Winter": Jaime Lannister, Bronn, and the Lannister Army arrive in King's Landing and witnesses Cersei Lannister being crowned by Qyburn as the new Queen of the Seven Kingdoms. Contains the melody of the House Lannister theme ("A Lannister Always Pays His Debts") and "Light of the Seven". | 2:16 |
| 19. | "The Winds of Winter" | "The Winds of Winter": Daenerys Targaryen finally sails for Westeros along with her three dragons, her whole army (the Unsullied and the Dothraki bloodriders), her new Hand Tyrion Lannister, Varys, and her new allies Theon and Yara Greyjoy, House Tyrell and House Martell (with the Sand Snakes). Contains the melodies of "Dracarys", the House Greyjoy theme ("What Is Dead May Never Die"), Daenerys Targaryen's theme, and main theme. | 3:29 |
| Total length: | | | 72:16 |

Bonus digital download tracks (Note: Made available on WaterTower Music's website through a personal identification number found in physical editions of the soundtrack. All bonus tracks were also released on all digital editions.)
| No. | Title | Key scenes/Notes | Length |
|---|---|---|---|
| 20. | "Lord of Light" | "Kissed by Fire": The Hound fights Beric Dondarrion in a trial by combat. "Home": Melisandre attempts to resurrect Jon Snow. She, Davos, Edd, and Tormund leave the room believing she has failed only for Jon to come back to life moments later. Contains the melody of the Melisandre theme ("Warrior of Light") and small hints of the Night's Watch theme ("The Wall"). | 4:16 |
| 21. | "Service of the Gods" | "Blood of My Blood": Jaime, Mace, Olenna, and Lannister and Tyrell soldiers go to the sept of Baelor to keep Margeary from the High Sparrow. The High Sparrow announces that Margaery will not have to do a walk of atonement and presents King Tommen who has agreed to unite the Faith and the Crown. Contains the melody of the House Baratheon theme ("The King's Arrival") and hints of the High Sparrow's theme ("High Sparrow"). | 2:48 |
| 22. | "I Need You by My Side" | "The Door": Jorah reveals his greyscale to Daenerys and admits his love for her. She emotionally orders him to find a cure and return to her, as she needs him by her side when she goes to Westeros. Contains the melody of the Daenerys theme. | 2:36 |
| 23. | "The Tower" | "The Winds of Winter": Young Ned Stark finds his dying sister inside the Tower of Joy (Bran's vision). We learn that Jon's mother is Lyanna Stark. Contains the melodies of "Heir to Winterfell" and House Stark theme ("Goodbye Brother"). | 2:33 |
| 24. | "Unbowed, Unbent, Unbroken" | "The Red Woman": As news of Myrcella's death arrives in Dorne, Tyene Sand kills Areo Hotah and Ellaria Sand murders Doran Martell. Obara Sand takes out Trystane Martell with her spear. Contains the melody of the House Martell theme ("Jaws of the Viper"). | 1:44 |
| 25. | "I Choose Violence" | Gregor "The Mountain" Clegane's theme. "Mother's Mercy": When Cersei is back in the Red Keep, Qyburn present her the new Gregor Clegane, The Mountain. "No One": Cersei refuses to go with the Faith Militant to see the High Sparrow. When one of them attacks, he is brutally killed by the Mountain and the others back away in fear. "The Dragon and the Wolf": Cersei, with Qyburn and The Mountain, comes back to Dragonpit to announce that she will help the North to fight the White Walkers. | 1:48 |
| 26. | "Hodor" | Unused in the series. A mournful rendition of "Three Eyed Raven". | 2:24 |
| Total length: | | | 90:25 |

== Credits and personnel ==
Personnel adapted from the album liner notes.

- David Benioff – liner notes
- Ramin Djawadi – composer, primary artist, producer
- D. B. Weiss – liner notes

== Charts ==
| Chart (2016) | Peak position |
|---|---|
| Australian Albums (ARIA) | 35 |
| Austrian Albums (Ö3 Austria) | 33 |
| Belgian Albums (Ultratop Flanders) | 59 |
| Belgian Albums (Ultratop Wallonia) | 57 |
| Canadian Albums (Billboard) | 79 |
| Dutch Albums (Album Top 100) | 92 |
| French Albums (SNEP) | 121 |
| German Albums (Offizielle Top 100) | 60 |
| Irish Albums (IRMA) | 45 |
| Scottish Albums (Official Charts) | 44 |
| Spanish Albums (Promusicae) | 76 |
| Swiss Albums (Schweizer Hitparade) | 44 |
| UK Albums (Official Charts) | 68 |
| UK Soundtrack Albums (OCC) | 2 |
| US Billboard 200 | 27 |
| US Soundtrack Albums (Billboard) | 1 |
| US Digital Albums (Billboard) | 5 |
| US Top Album Sales (Billboard) | 12 |

== Awards and nominations ==
| Year | Award | Category | Nominee(s) | Result | Ref. |
|---|---|---|---|---|---|
| 2016 | International Film Music Critics Association Awards | Best Original Score for a Television Series | Game of Thrones (season 6) | Won | |
| 2016 | International Film Music Critics Association Awards | Film Music Composition of the Year | "Light of the Seven" | Nominated | |
| 2016 | World Soundtrack Awards | Television Composer of the Year | Ramin Djawadi (Note: Ramin Djawadi was also nominated for his work on Person of Interest, The Strain and Westworld.) | Nominated | |
