= Light of the Seven =

Musical piece by Ramin Djawadi from Game of Thrones

Song by Ramin Djawadi

from the album Game of Thrones: Season 6
- Released: June 24, 2016
- Recorded: 2016
- Genre: Soundtrack
- Length: 9:49
- Label: WaterTower Music
- Songwriter: Ramin Djawadi
- Producer: Ramin Djawadi

"Light of the Seven" is an orchestral piano piece in the HBO fantasy series Game of Thrones, the television series adaptation of A Song of Ice and Fire by George R. R. Martin. It first played during the show's season six finale and was composed by Ramin Djawadi in 2016. "Light of the Seven" is the first time piano is used in the music for Game of Thrones. It was nominated by the International Film Music Critics Association for Film Music Composition of the Year.

== Background ==
In an interview, Djawadi spoke about "Light of the Seven", which largely consisted of piano, something unusual for the series. Djawadi stated, "The interesting thing to me was the use of the piano. When we started the season showrunners David Benioff and Dan Weiss, and Miguel Sapochnik, the director of the episode, reached out to me and said, 'There's something coming up in episode 10.' We talked about the 'Light of the Seven', and how it needed to be a new piece of music. Any kind of character theme could tip it, and we didn't want to tip the audience. Miguel brought it up: 'What about the piano?' We discussed it. The piano is not really in the language of the Game of Thrones score." Djawadi had tried other instruments, including playing the whole tune with harp, but none of them sounded right, eventually he settled on the colder sound of the piano.

Djawadi said: "It all felt like a perfect fit. What's great about the scene, too, is there's hardly any dialogue. It's nine minutes long. I knew I had to start minimal and give it space. Let notes ring, then give it space, and build up the anticipation from there, without tipping in either direction." Djawadi stated that he refrained from using the typical Lannister theme, "The Rains of Castamere", in order to create more of a mystery. The piece also featured vocals from two young boys singing in unison, and Djawadi instructed the boys to sing in such a way that it is "not out of tune, but you get that feeling of something's wrong." Djawadi describing how he pieced all of the separate pieces of the music together by saying "The boys I recorded completely separate. The strings I recorded all together. Even the solo instruments, I recorded them separately — the solo violins and solo cellists were recorded separately. The piano, I played. And the organ as well."

In another interview, Djawadi talked about the process, saying, "That was the big guidance for me, in how I wanted to build this piece, It's a different instrument, and I put it in an upper register, but the idea is that it's building something that stays the same but changes over time. Of course, now that I say that, people might be like, 'No, it's not really that.' And it's not staying true to the form. Obviously the picture is guiding me, so I have to pull back and break away from it. I couldn't keep it as a passacaglia all the way through. But there are definitely moments where it defaults to that."

== Composition ==
"Light of the Seven" has a duration of approximately ten minutes. When Djawadi originally composed the piece, he intended at first to make it a passacaglia. The instrumentation of "Light of the Seven" consists of piano, organ, strings and two boy soloists. On why he decided to use two young soloists instead of a full choir, Djawadi said, "I felt that two of them were more haunting than using a full choir, because it's a smaller environment, when they're running around in the catacombs."

== Reception ==
The piece received universal praise from critics and fans, with Lili Loofbourow of The Week calling it the "real winner" of the season finale. Djawadi responded to the universal praise the composition got, saying, "I never would have thought that would happen, it's so exciting because it's such a special finale."

=== Accolades ===
Year	Award	Category	Nominee(s)	Result	Ref.
2016	International Film Music Critics Association	Film Music Composition of the Year	Ramin Djawadi	Nominated	

== Credits and personnel ==
Personnel adapted from the album liner notes.

- Ramin Djawadi – composer, primary artist, producer
- David Benioff – liner notes
- D.B. Weiss – liner notes

== Live performances ==
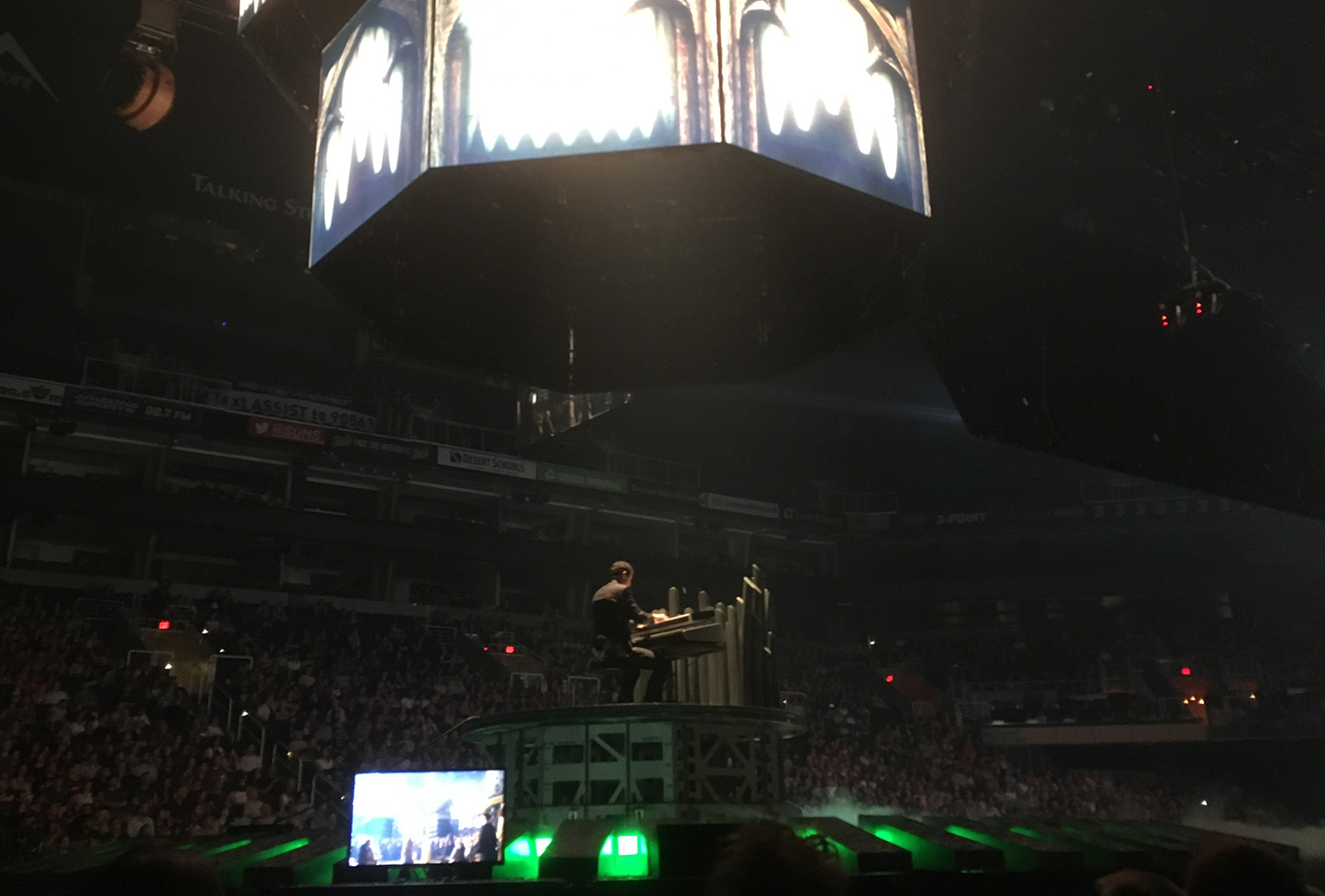
Djawadi performing "Light of the Seven" at the Game of Thrones Live Concert Experience.

Djawadi has performed the piece with a live orchestra at the Game of Thrones Live Concert Experience, which consisted of 24 dates in cities across the United States and Canada.

== Aftermath ==
A remixed version of "Light of the Seven" was used in a season 7 trailer. The final motif from this piece is used in the season 6 track "Hear Me Roar", and is also used from season 7 onwards in tracks involving Cersei Lannister and her machinations, such as "The Long Farewell" or "No One Walks Away from Me", acting as an alternate theme to "The Rains of Castamere" for her character. Part of the song also appeared in the song that played during Cersei's death, "For Cersei" (as well as a variation of "Rains of Castamere")

== Charts ==
Chart (2016)	Peak position
France (SNEP)	32
Hungary (Single Top 40)	9

== See also ==
- Game of Thrones Theme
- Music of Game of Thrones
