= Game of Thrones: Season 8 (soundtrack) =

Soundtrack album by Ramin Djawadi
- Released: May 19, 2019
- Genre: Soundtrack
- Length: 119:33
- Label: WaterTower Music
- Producer: Ramin Djawadi

Ramin Djawadi soundtrack chronology
Tom Clancy's Jack Ryan: Season 1 (2018)	Game of Thrones: Season 8 (2019)	Westworld: Season 3 (2020)

Singles from Game of Thrones: Season 8
- 1. "The Night King" Released: April 28, 2019

The soundtrack album of the eighth season of HBO series Game of Thrones, titled Game of Thrones: Season 8, was released digitally on May 19, 2019, a double CD was released July 19, 2019, and was released on vinyl later in the year.

Ramin Djawadi received his seventh Primetime Emmy Award nomination, for Outstanding Music Composition for a Series (Original Dramatic Score), for the season's third episode, "The Long Night" and then won the award, making two consecutive wins for Djawadi.

== Background ==
"It's been such an honor to be a part of this incredible show for the past eight years", said Ramin Djawadi.

Djawadi says of his track "The Night King": "When I talked to Miguel [Sapochnik], the director, and when David [Benioff] and [D. B. Weiss] came to my studio and we started working on this episode, we all agreed that it had to be a piano piece again, just like 'Light of the Seven'. [...] It definitely misled the audience because of what they knew from 'Light of the Seven', back in season six. We always treated the music as another character in the show."

== Track listing ==
No.	Title	Key scenes/Notes	Length
1.	"Main Title"	Used for the opening sequence. New version introduced in season 6.	1:51
2.	"The Rains of Castamere" (with Serj Tankian)	Unused in the series. A new version of the song.	3:44
3.	"Arrival at Winterfell"	"Winterfell": Opening scene. Jon and Daenerys arrive in Winterfell with Daenerys's armies. Contains the House Baratheon theme ("The King's Arrival"), the dragon theme ("Breaker of Chains"), and the House Stark theme ("Goodbye Brother"). "The Last of the Starks": The melody appears when Daenerys rides Drogon beside Rhaegal in Dragonstone, before Euron Greyjoy strikes Rhaegal.	3:43
4.	"Flight of Dragons"	"Winterfell": Jon rides Rhaegal for the first time, and Daenerys rides Drogon. Contains the Daenerys and Jon Snow theme ("Truth").	2:51
5.	"Heir to the Throne"	"Winterfell": Samwell tells Jon that he is an heir to the Iron Throne.	2:26
6.	"Jenny of Oldstones"	Unused in the series. "A Knight of the Seven Kingdoms": An a cappella version of the song is sung by Podrick.	2:30
7.	"A Knight of the Seven Kingdoms"	"A Knight of the Seven Kingdoms": Jaime knights Brienne.	1:59
8.	"The Battle of Winterfell"	"The Long Night": At the beginning of the battle, Melisandre lights the swords and the Dothraki charge. Contains Melisandre's theme ("The Red Woman") and the main theme.	4:03
9.	"The Dead Are Already Here"	"The Long Night": Ser Davos realizes Daenerys can't see the signal to set the trench on fire; Melisandre lights the trench. Contains Melisandre's theme ("The Red Woman").	4:55
10.	"Battle for the Skies"	"The Long Night": The dragons fight. Contains the White Walkers ("Against All Odds", "White Walkers", and "The Army of the Dead") and Targaryen melodies ("Love in the Eyes", "Dracarys", "Breaker of Chains", and "Dance of Dragons").	4:13
11.	"The Long Night Pt. 1"	"The Long Night": Arya is fighting the army of the dead; Lord Beric Dondarrion urges the Hound to fight; Lyanna Mormont dies killing a wight giant. Contains the White Walkers ("Against All Odds", "White Walkers", and "The Army of the Dead") and Arya melodies ("Valar Morghulis" and "Needle").	3:42
12.	"The Long Night Pt. 2"	"The Long Night": The Night King raises the dead of Winterfell; Ser Jorah and Daenerys fight against the wights.	3:47
13.	"The Night King"	The Night King's theme. "The Long Night": Climax of the Battle of Winterfell. Sansa and Tyrion share a tender moment; Jon is attacked by Viserion; the Night King kills Theon and approaches Bran. Briefly includes the main theme.	8:50
14.	"Dead Before the Dawn"	"The Long Night": The dead are defeated. Ser Jorah dies in Daenerys's arms; Melisandre walks into the snow and dies. Contains Melisandre's theme ("The Red Woman") and hints of the main theme.	4:14
15.	"Not Today"	"The Long Night": End credits. A rendition of "The Night King" with choirs.	2:21
16.	"Farewell"	"The Last of the Starks": The dead are mourned and the funeral pyres are lit. Contains the "Night King" melody.	5:31
17.	"Outside the Gates"	"The Last of the Starks": Tyrion approaches the walls of King's Landing and asks Cersei to surrender; Missandei is executed by Ser Gregor; Daenerys leaves in anger.	4:09
18.	"The Bells"	"The Bells": Cersei's armies prepare to defend King's Landing; the residents of the city seek shelter in the Red Keep; Arya and the Hound approach the Red Keep. Also used when Daenerys begins burning the city indiscriminately after the bells are rung. Contains hints of the main theme.	3:44
19.	"The Last War"	"The Bells": Daenerys and her armies attack King's Landing. Contains hints of Daenerys Targaryen’s theme ("Love in the Eyes", "Dracarys", "Breaker of Chains", and "Dance of Dragons"). Contains Cersei's melody ("Light of the Seven").	7:37
20.	"Into the Fire"	"The Bells": The Hound tackles the Mountain and they fall from the Red Keep into the fire.	1:43
21.	"For Cersei"	"The Bells": Until 03:03: Cersei and Jaime die. From 03:03: used in the end credits. Contains the Lannisters' ("A Lannister Always Pays His Debts") and Cersei's melodies ("Light of the Seven").	4:24
22.	"Believe"	"The Bells": Arya wakes up and leaves the city. Contains the Starks' melody ("Goodbye Brother") and the main title theme.	4:24
23.	"Stay a Thousand Years"	Unused in the series. A rendition of "Truth" with choirs.	2:29
24.	"Nothing Else Matters"	"The Iron Throne": Tyrion finds Jaime and Cersei's dead bodies under the rubble of the Red Keep. Contains the House Lannisters theme ("A Lannister Always Pays His Debts").	2:06
25.	"Master of War"	"The Iron Throne": Daenerys gives a speech to her forces in King's Landing. She names Grey Worm her Master of War. Daenerys approaches the Iron Throne. Contains a choral version of the title theme.	4:49
26.	"Be with Me"	"The Iron Throne": Daenerys convinces Jon to build the new "good world" together alongside her. They kiss. Then Jon stabs Daenerys, killing her. Contains the "Truth" melody.	1:45
27.	"The Iron Throne"	"The Iron Throne": Drogon destroys the Iron Throne and flies away with Daenerys's body. Contains the main theme, the "Truth" melody, Daenerys's theme ("Love in the Eyes"), "Breaker of Chains" melody, and the dragons' melody ("Blood of the Dragon").	5:39
28.	"Break the Wheel"	"The Iron Throne": Bran is named Lord of the Six Kingdoms. Contains the Starks' melody ("Goodbye Brother").	4:29
29.	"You Have a Choice"	"The Iron Throne": Jon Snow is released from imprisonment. He says goodbye to Sansa, Arya and Bran and sets sail for the North. Contains the "Truth" melody.	2:22
30.	"The White Book"	"The Iron Throne": Brienne fills out Jaime Lannister's pages in the White Book. Contains the melodies of "The Old Gods and the New" and "I Am Hers, She Is Mine".	2:09
31.	"The Last of the Starks"	"The Iron Throne": Jon arrives at Castle Black and is reunited with Ghost. Sansa is crowned Queen in the North. Arya sets sail for the West. Contains the Stark’s theme ("Goodbye Brother"). A shorter version is used on the main menu of season 8's DVD/Blu-ray release.	4:52
32.	"A Song of Ice and Fire"	"The Iron Throne": Jon rides beyond the Wall with Tormund and the Wildlings. Continues into the end credits. Final scene and song of Game of Thrones. An uplifting rendition of the main theme with choirs.	2:11
Total length:			119:33

== Charts ==
Chart (2019)	Peak position
Australian Albums (ARIA)	75
Austrian Albums (Ö3 Austria)	57
Belgian Albums (Ultratop Flanders)	58
Belgian Albums (Ultratop Wallonia)	67
Czech Albums (ČNS IFPI)	71
French Albums (SNEP)	88
German Albums (Offizielle Top 100)	58
Spanish Albums (PROMUSICAE)	51
Swiss Albums (Schweizer Hitparade)	25
UK Soundtrack Albums (OCC)	6
US Billboard 200	95
US Soundtrack Albums (Billboard)	6
