= Game of Thrones Live Concert Experience =

2017–19 concert tour by Ramin Djawadi

- Tour by Ramin Djawadi
- Promotional poster for the tour
- Associated albums: Game of Thrones seasons 1–8
- Start date: February 10, 2017
- End date: October 5, 2019
- Legs: 3
- No. of shows: 64 in North America; 23 in Europe; 87 Total

Game of Thrones Live Concert Experience is the concert tour by the HBO epic fantasy series Game of Thrones featuring composer Ramin Djawadi. The all-arena tour was announced on August 8, 2016 at an intimate concert in Los Angeles, California. The tour consists of 24 dates in cities across the United States and Canada. The tour's title, "Music Is Coming" is in reference to House Stark motto, "Winter Is Coming." The concert started on February 20, 2017 in Saint Paul, Minnesota and ended April 2 in Portland, Oregon.

A world tour was announced in September 2017. It started in May 2018 in Madrid and ended in October in Toronto. A third tour in North America started on September 5, 2019 finishing on October 5, 2019.

== Background ==
On August 8, 2016, composer Ramin Djawadi announced the Game of Thrones Live Concert Experience Tour at an event at the Hollywood Palladium in Los Angeles with Isaac Hempstead Wright, who plays Bran Stark in the series. The tour started in Saint Paul, Minnesota and concluded in Portland, Oregon. The tour consisted of 24 cities across the United States, with additional stops in Toronto, Ontario and Montreal, Quebec in Canada.

The tour featured the show's composer, Ramin Djawadi, conducting an 80-piece orchestra and choir, which performed highlights from the series' musical score, on a 360-degree stage. In addition, LED telescoping and wall screens, and special 3D designs, rose from the stage floor. Instruments were specially created for the tour, such as a 14-foot Wildling horn played during the Wildling attack on the Wall section.

We really want to summarize the show the best we can, There's a lot of different locations and events to cover. If you come and watch this concert, you really get a nice summary and a nice look back on the past seasons. The one I'm really excited about is 'Light of the Seven,' which was such a great surprise to the viewers, because it's the first time we're using piano, Besides the orchestra and the choir, we will have the piano and that piece to play. That'll be really great live. - Ramin Djawadi

In an interview, Djawadi talked about the tour, saying, "I'm going through the music to adapt it more for a live performance, and I might have a vocalist on a piece that didn't have one before, or lengthen another piece, I'm not bound to the picture anymore, so I can let the music tell its own story, and be creative about it."

== Stage ==
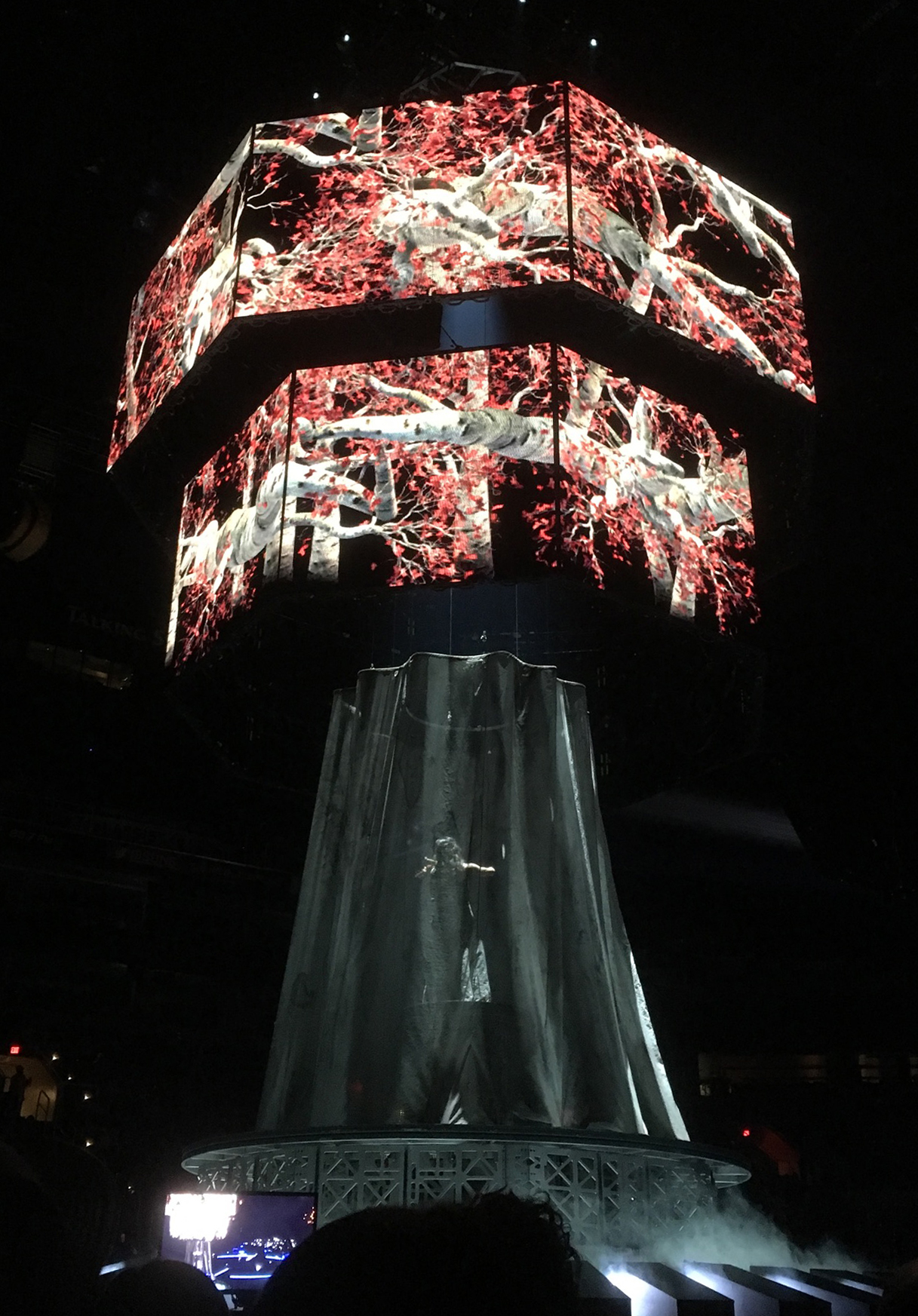
A weirwood tree is formed on the stage during the concert

The concert contained multiple stages and the main stage (King's Landing stage), and featured Djawadi as conductor with the orchestra and choir. On the other side of the stage (Winterfell stage) were another choir and more soloists. In between those stages were four smaller stages, with each being named after different locations from the world of Game of Thrones. There was also a runway between the two main stages, that was also a location.

== Setlist ==
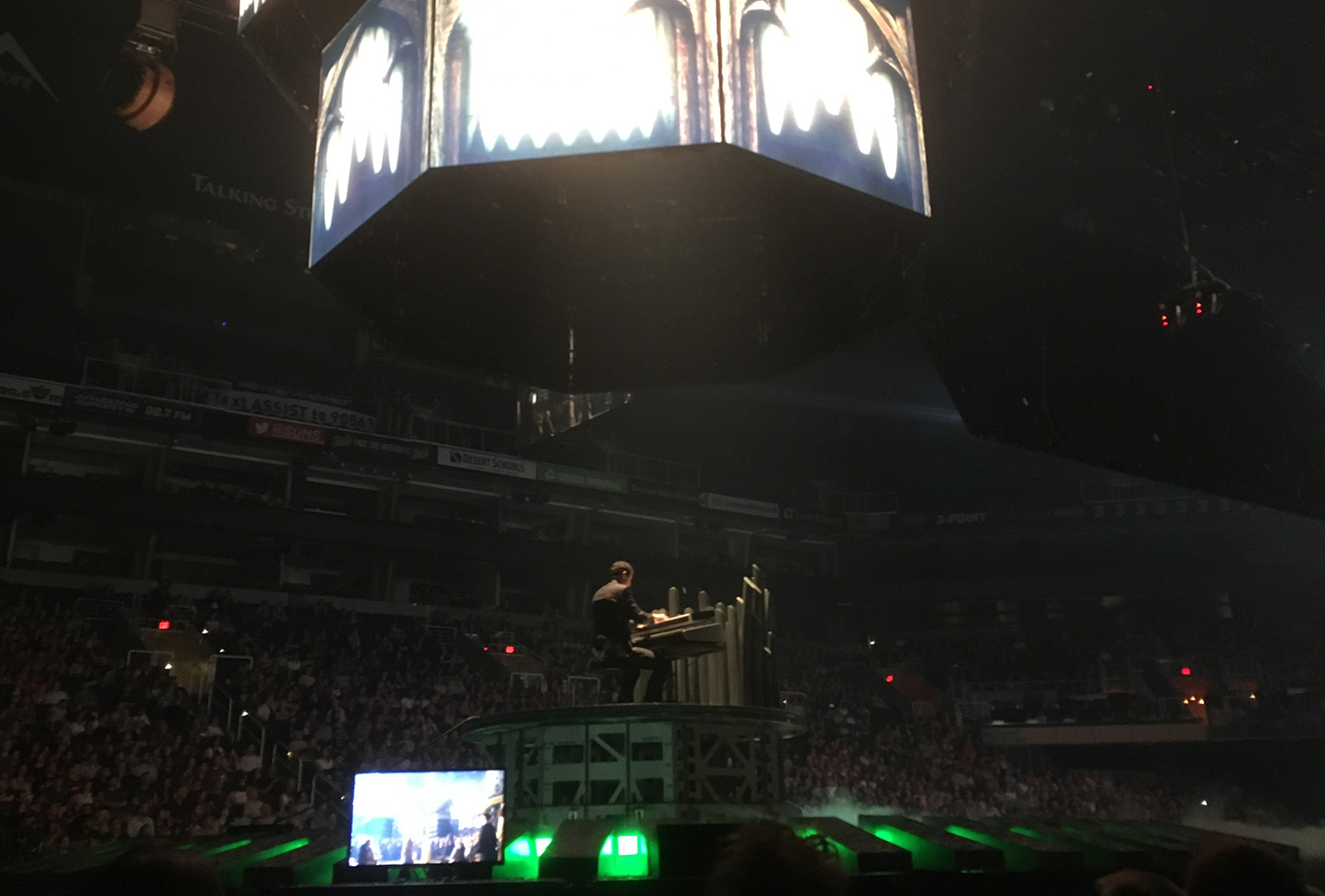
Ramin Djawadi performing "Light of the Seven" at the Game of Thrones Live Concert Experience

This setlist was performed at the October 6, 2018 concert held at Allstate Arena in Rosemont. It does not represent all shows throughout the tour.

First set

1. "Game of Thrones Theme"
2. "House Themes: Medley"
3. "Goodbye Brother"
4. "Love in the Eyes"
5. "Finale"
6. "The Red Woman"
7. "Wildfire"
8. "The Rains of Castamere"
9. "The Lannisters Send Their Regards"
10. "Whitewalkers"
11. "You Know Nothing"
12. "Needle"
13. "Dracarys"
14. "Mhysa"

Second set

1. "The Children"
2. "High Sparrow"
3. "Atonement"
4. "Reign"
5. "My Watch Has Ended"
6. "Hold the Door"
7. "Let's Play a Game"
8. "Bastard"
9. "Trust Each Other"
10. "Light of the Seven"
11. "The Winds of Winter"
12. "Home"
13. "I Am the Storm"
14. "The Queen's Justice"
15. "The Spoils of War"
16. "Truth"
17. "Winter Is Here"
18. "The Army of the Dead"

Encore

1. "Game of Thrones Theme"

== Shows ==
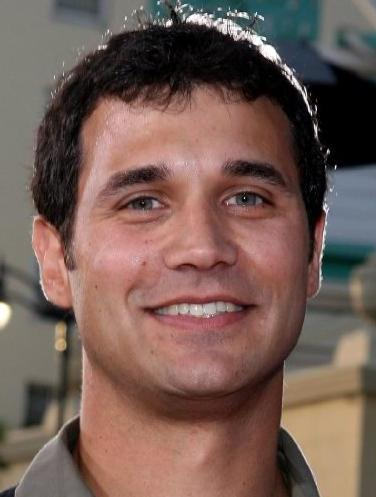
Ramin Djawadi is the composer of the Game of Thrones score

=== Dates performed ===
List of concerts, showing date, city, country, venue, tickets sold, number of available tickets and amount of gross revenue
Date	City	Country	Venue	Attendance/Capacity	Revenue
Leg 1 – North America
February 20, 2017	Saint Paul	United States	Xcel Energy Center	—	—
February 22, 2017	Chicago	United States	United Center	7,470 / 11,427	$528,197
February 23, 2017	Columbus	United States	Nationwide Arena	—	—
February 25, 2017	Uncasville	United States	Mohegan Sun Arena	7,430 / 7,463	$484,925
February 26, 2017	Philadelphia	United States	Wells Fargo Center	9,967 / 18,126	$596,907
March 1, 2017	Washington, D.C.	United States	Verizon Center	—	—
March 3, 2017	Montreal	Canada	Bell Centre	8,374 / 10,166	$548,767
March 4, 2017	Toronto	Canada	Air Canada Centre	—	—
March 6, 2017	Boston	United States	TD Garden	8,851 / 15,308	$591,156
March 7, 2017	New York City	United States	Madison Square Garden	14,633 / 17,046	$1,237,251
March 9, 2017	Charlotte	United States	Spectrum Center	4,290 / 6,953	$268,614
March 11, 2017	Sunrise	United States	BB&T Center	6,582 / 10,911	$420,052
March 12, 2017	Tampa	United States	Amalie Arena	5,856 / 9,559	$370,569
March 14, 2017	Atlanta	United States	Philips Arena	—	—
March 16, 2017	San Antonio	United States	AT&T Center	4,350 / 7,647	$293,448
March 17, 2017	Houston	United States	Toyota Center	7,084 / 9,573	$488,091
March 19, 2017	Denver	United States	Pepsi Center	6,158 / 10,608	$401,350
March 23, 2017	Inglewood	United States	The Forum	13,529 / 15,782	$1,058,872
March 25, 2017	Las Vegas	United States	MGM Grand Garden Arena	4,783 / 7,321	$328,286
March 26, 2017	Phoenix	United States	Talking Stick Resort Arena	5,670 / 14,782	$341,607
March 29, 2017	San Jose	United States	SAP Center	11,249 / 16,492	$910,206
March 31, 2017	Seattle	United States	KeyArena	9,014 / 14,092	$579,469
April 1, 2017	Vancouver	Canada	Rogers Arena	—	—
April 2, 2017	Portland	United States	Moda Center	—	—
Leg 2 – Europe
May 8, 2018	Madrid	Spain	WiZink Center	—	—
May 10, 2018	Barcelona	Spain	Palau Sant Jordi	—	—
May 12, 2018	Paris	France	AccorHotels Arena	—	—
May 14, 2018	Berlin	Germany	Mercedes-Benz Arena	—	—
May 15, 2018	Łódź	Poland	Atlas Arena	—	—
May 16, 2018	Prague	Czech Republic	O_{2} Arena	—	—
May 18, 2018	Budapest	Hungary	Budapest Sports Arena	—	—
May 19, 2018	Vienna	Austria	Wiener Stadthalle	—	—
May 21, 2018	Amsterdam	Netherlands	Ziggo Dome	—	—
May 22, 2018	Antwerp	Belgium	Sportpaleis	—	—
May 24, 2018	Dublin	Ireland	3Arena	—	—
May 25, 2018	Belfast	Northern Ireland	The SSE Arena	—	—
May 27, 2018	London	England	Wembley Arena	—	—
May 29, 2018	Hamburg	Germany	Barclaycard Arena	—	—
May 31, 2018	Stockholm	Sweden	Ericsson Globe	—	—
June 1, 2018	Copenhagen	Denmark	Royal Arena	—	—
June 4, 2018	Munich	Germany	Olympiahalle	—	—
June 5, 2018	Zürich	Switzerland	Hallenstadion	6,557 / 9,500	$615,854
June 7, 2018	Frankfurt	Germany	Festhalle Frankfurt	—	—
June 8, 2018	Cologne	Germany	Lanxess Arena	—	—
June 11, 2018	Glasgow	Scotland	SSE Hydro	—	—
June 12, 2018	Manchester	England	Manchester Arena	—	—
June 14, 2018	London	England	Wembley Arena	—	—
Leg 3 – North America
September 6, 2018	Seattle	United States	KeyArena	—	—
September 8, 2018	San Jose	United States	SAP Center	—	—
September 9, 2018	Inglewood	United States	The Forum	—	—
September 11, 2018	San Diego	United States	Viejas Arena	—	—
September 12, 2018	Glendale	United States	Gila River Arena	—	—
September 14, 2018	Denver	United States	Pepsi Center	—	—
September 16, 2018	Dallas	United States	American Airlines Center	—	—
September 17, 2018	Houston	United States	Toyota Center	—	—
September 18, 2018	Austin	United States	Frank Erwin Center	—	—
September 21, 2018	Tampa	United States	Amalie Arena	—	—
September 22, 2018	Sunrise	United States	BB&T Center	—	—
September 25, 2018	Washington, D.C.	United States	Capital One Arena	—	—
September 26, 2018	Newark	United States	Prudential Center	—	—
September 28, 2018	Uncasville	United States	Mohegan Sun Arena	—	—
September 29, 2018	Worcester	United States	DCU Center	—	—
October 2, 2018	Philadelphia	United States	Wells Fargo Center	—	—
October 3, 2018	New York City	United States	Madison Square Garden	—	—
October 5, 2018	St. Louis	United States	Enterprise Center	—	—
October 6, 2018	Rosemont	United States	Allstate Arena	—	—
October 9, 2018	Detroit	United States	Little Caesars Arena	—	—
October 10, 2018	Columbus	United States	Schottenstein Center	—	—
October 12, 2018	Montreal	Canada	Bell Centre	—	—
October 14, 2018	Toronto	Canada	Scotiabank Arena	—	—
Leg 4 – North America
September 6, 2019	Toronto	Canada	Budweiser Stage	—	—
September 8, 2019	Tinley Park	United States	Hollywood Casino Amphitheatre	—	—
September 10, 2019	Mansfield	United States	Xfinity Center	—	—
September 12, 2019	Philadelphia	United States	Mann Center for the Performing Arts	—	—
September 14, 2019	Wantagh	United States	Northwell Health at Jones Beach Theater	—	—
September 15, 2019	Bristow	United States	Jiffy Lube Live	—	—
September 20, 2019	Jacksonville	United States	Daily's Place	—	—
September 21, 2019	West Palm Beach	United States	Coral Sky Amphitheatre	—	—
September 22, 2019	Tampa	United States	MidFlorida Credit Union Amphitheatre	—	—
September 24, 2019	Alpharetta	United States	Ameris Bank Amphitheatre	—	—
September 26, 2019	Irving	United States	The Pavilion at Toyota Music Factory	—	—
September 27, 2019	The Woodlands	United States	Cynthia Woods Mitchell Pavilion	—	—
September 30, 2019	Santa Fe	United States	Santa Fe Opera	—	—
October 1, 2019	Phoenix	United States	Comerica Theatre	—	—
October 3, 2019	Mountain View	United States	Shoreline Amphitheatre	—	—
October 4, 2019	Irvine	United States	FivePoint Amphitheatre	—	—
October 5, 2019	Los Angeles	United States	Hollywood Bowl	—	—
Total				—	—

=== Dates cancelled ===
List of cancelled concerts, showing date, city, country, venue and reason for cancellation
Date	City	Country	Venue	Reason
February 15, 2017	Kansas City	United States	Sprint Center	Unknown reason
February 20, 2017	Auburn Hills	United States	The Palace of Auburn Hills	Unknown reason
February 23, 2017	Buffalo	United States	KeyBank Center	Unknown reason
March 21, 2017	West Valley City	United States	Maverik Center	Unknown reason
September 5, 2018	Vancouver	Canada	Rogers Arena	Unknown reason
September 30, 2018	University Park	United States	Bryce Jordan Center	Unknown reason
September 5, 2019	Syracuse	United States	Carrier Dome	Unknown reason
September 11, 2019	Hartford	United States	XFINITY Theatre	Unknown reason
September 17, 2019	Virginia Beach	United States	Veterans United Home Loans Amphitheater	Unknown reason
September 18, 2019	Raleigh	United States	Coastal Credit Union Music Park	Unknown reason
September 25, 2019	Rogers	United States	Walmart Arkansas Music Pavilion	Unknown reason

== Reception ==
The concert has received positive reviews.

== See also ==
- Music of Game of Thrones
