= Westworld: Season 3 (soundtrack) =

Soundtrack album by Ramin Djawadi
- Released: May 3, 2020
- Genre: Soundtrack
- Length: 94:21
- Label: WaterTower Music
- Producer: Ramin Djawadi

Ramin Djawadi soundtracks chronology
Game of Thrones: Season 8 (2019)	Westworld: Season 3 (2020)	Elephant (2020)

Westworld: Season 3 is the third soundtrack of the American television series Westworld, composed by Ramin Djawadi. Released on May 3, 2020, the day the season finale aired, the album includes 29 pieces composed for the show. Like the previous soundtracks, the soundtrack features original compositions by Djawadi and also many cover versions of modern songs, featuring covers of Massive Attack, Guns N' Roses, Moses Sumney, Björk, The Weeknd, David Bowie and Pink Floyd, while also featuring a cover of The Shining's main theme by Wendy Carlos and Rachel Elkind.

== Reception ==
The soundtrack received positive reviews from critics. Prahlad Srihari from Firstpost commented: "Occupying that nebulous zone between soundtrack and score, the Westworld music destined to endure will inevitably be Djawadi's covers. Stylistic gimmicks or not, these covers are infectiously catchy, and arguably boast a higher replay value than the series itself." Alec Bojalad from Den of Geek stated: "The Westworld soundtrack quickly became partially defined by its minimalist piano covers of modern pop songs." Jesse Schedeen from the IGN gave a positive review by stating: "Either way, whether you prefer your HBO dramas full of swords and dragons or psychologically tortured androids, Djawadi has the right music for any occasion."

== Track listing ==
All music by Ramin Djawadi, except where noted.

No.	Title	Key scenes/Notes	Length
1.	"Main Title Theme - Westworld"	Used for the opening credits sequence.	1:41
2.	"Start a Revolution"	"The Mother of Exiles"	2:36
3.	"Caleb"	"Parce Domine"	4:38
4.	"Rehoboam"	"Parce Domine"	2:39
5.	"Dissolved Girl"	"Parce Domine": The track is a piano arrangement of the song of the same name by Massive Attack.	3:27
6.	"MOTO"	"Parce Domine"	2:40
7.	"Unsubscribe"	"Parce Domine"	3:15
8.	"You Are Not Even You"	"Parce Domine"	2:04
9.	"I Don't Do Personals"	"Parce Domine"	3:09
10.	"Sweet Child O' Mine"	It was used in the final trailer for this season. The track is an orchestral arrangement of the song of the same name by Guns N' Roses	1:25
11.	"Serac"	"The Winter Line"	3:17
12.	"The Winter Line"	"The Winter Line"	4:14
13.	"It's Our Choice"	"The Absence of Field"	2:41
14.	"Doomed"	"The Absence of Field": The track is a piano arrangement of the song of the same name by Moses Sumney.	4:01
15.	"Decoherence"	"Decoherence"	2:54
16.	"Hunter"	"The Mother of Exiles": The track is a piano arrangement of the song of the same name by Björk.	3:40
17.	"Why Are We Here?"	"The Mother of Exiles"	2:39
18.	"Wicked Games"	"The Mother of Exiles": The track is an orchestral arrangement of the song of the same name by The Weeknd.	5:31
19.	"Hope"	"The Mother of Exiles"	4:42
20.	"Who's to Blame"	"Genre"	2:58
21.	"Activate"	"The Winter Line"	3:47
22.	"Space Oddity"	"Genre": The track is an orchestral arrangement of the song of the same name by David Bowie.	3:49
23.	"The Choice Is Yours"	"Crisis Theory"	3:29
24.	"Main Title from The Shining"	"Genre: The track is a cover version of The Shining's theme by Wendy Carlos and Rachel Elkind.	2:01
25.	"Brain Damage"	"Crisis Theory": The track is a piano arrangement of the song of the same name by Pink Floyd.	3:55
26.	"Divergence"	"Crisis Theory"	4:05
27.	"Choose the Beauty"	"Crisis Theory"	3:29
28.	"Welcome to the End"	"Crisis Theory"	2:01
29.	"Free Will"	"Crisis Theory"	3:34
Total length:			94:21

== Charts ==
Chart (2020)	Peak position
American iTunes Chart (iTunes)	41
