= The Winds of Winter (Game of Thrones) =

- Game of Thrones episode
- Episode no.: Season 6 Episode 10
- Directed by: Miguel Sapochnik
- Written by: David Benioff; D. B. Weiss
- Cinematography by: Fabian Wagner
- Editing by: Tim Porter
- Original air date: June 26, 2016
- Running time: 68 minutes

Guest appearances
- Diana Rigg as Olenna Tyrell; David Bradley as Walder Frey; Julian Glover as Grand Maester Pycelle; Anton Lesser as Qyburn; Joseph Mawle as Benjen Stark; Finn Jones as Loras Tyrell; Ian Gelder as Kevan Lannister; Roger Ashton-Griffiths as Mace Tyrell; Jacob Anderson as Grey Worm; Gemma Whelan as Yara Greyjoy; Ellie Kendrick as Meera Reed; Eugene Simon as Lancel Lannister; Keisha Castle-Hughes as Obara Sand; Rosabell Laurenti Sellers as Tyene Sand; Jessica Henwick as Nymeria Sand; Rupert Vansittart as Yohn Royce; Tim McInnerny as Robett Glover; Hafþór Júlíus Björnsson as Gregor Clegane; Hannah Waddingham as Septa Unella; Daniel Tuite as Lothar Frey; Tim Plester as Walder Rivers; Robert Aramayo as young Ned Stark; Aisling Franciosi as Lyanna Stark; Bella Ramsey as Lyanna Mormont; Josephine Gillan as Marei; Sabrina Bartlett as Arya's disguise; Sean Blowers as Wyman Manderly; Tom Varey as Cley Cerwyn

Episode chronology
← Previous "Battle of the Bastards"	Next → "Dragonstone"
- Game of Thrones season 6

"The Winds of Winter" is the final episode of the sixth season of HBO's fantasy television series Game of Thrones, and the sixtieth overall. It was written by series co-creators David Benioff and D. B. Weiss, and directed by Miguel Sapochnik.

Cersei Lannister destroy her immediate enemies with one swift stroke and crowns herself Queen of the Seven Kingdoms; Jon Snow is declared King in the North by the lords of the Northern houses; Bran Stark learns that Jon is actually the son of Lyanna Stark; Arya Stark wreaks vengeance on House Frey; Samwell Tarly arrives at the Citadel; and Daenerys Targaryen begins sailing to Westeros alongside Tyrion Lannister, her entire army, three dragons, as well as the Ironborn loyal to Yara Greyjoy, the Tyrells, the Sand Snakes, and their respective fleets. The title of the episode, named for the book, references the awaited winter finally beginning in Westeros.

"The Winds of Winter" was widely praised by critics, listing it as one of the series' best episodes as well as one of the best television episodes of all time. The Great Sept explosion, Lena Headey's performance, Arya's revenge, the resolution to the Tower of Joy flashback, Daenerys heading to Westeros, and the music scoring were dubbed highlights of the episode. In the United States, the episode achieved a viewership of 8.89 million in its initial broadcast, making it the highest rated episode in the series's history at that time. It was nominated for several awards, including Headey for the Emmy for Outstanding Supporting Actress in a Drama Series, and won the Emmy for Outstanding Costumes for a Period/Fantasy Series, Limited Series or Movie.

This episode marks the final appearance for Natalie Dormer (Queen Margaery Tyrell), Dean-Charles Chapman (King Tommen Baratheon), Finn Jones (Ser Loras Tyrell), Eugene Simon (Lancel Lannister), Ian Gelder (Kevan Lannister), Jonathan Pryce (The High Sparrow), Roger Ashton-Griffiths (Mace Tyrell), Julian Glover (Grand Maester Pycelle), and Michiel Huisman (Daario Naharis).

== Plot ==
=== At the Twins ===
Arya Stark gets revenge on Walder Frey by killing his sons and baking them into a meat pie. Disguised as a servant girl, she serves him the pie before slitting his throat, after identifying herself to the confused Walder by removing the servant's face and revealing her own, as a Stark.

=== In King's Landing ===
Qyburn summons Grand Maester Pycelle to his laboratory, where his child spies stab Pycelle to death.

Ser Loras confesses to his crimes and atones by giving up his name and title, and joining the Faith Militant. After Cersei and King Tommen fail to appear, Lancel finds a wildfire cache about to explode. The wildfire destroys the Great Sept, killing everyone inside, including Margaery, Loras, Mace, Kevan, Lancel and the High Sparrow. Septa Unella is tortured by the Mountain at Cersei's orders. Tommen witnesses the explosion from the Red Keep. After being informed of Margaery's death, he commits suicide by jumping out of a window. Cersei visits Tommen's body and orders Qyburn that Tommen's body should be burned and buried in what is left of the Great Sept of Baelor, where his grandfather Tywin, brother Joffrey, and sister Myrcella are buried. With her last child dead, Cersei is crowned Queen of the Seven Kingdoms.

=== In Oldtown ===
Samwell and Gilly report to the Citadel, and Sam is scheduled to meet the Archmaester. In the meantime, he is granted access to the Citadel's library.

=== At Winterfell ===
An enraged Ser Davos confronts Melisandre about her role in Shireen's death; she admits to burning her alive, but declares that she did it for the Lord of Light. Jon banishes Melisandre from the North and he and Davos threaten to execute her if she ever returns. Jon and Sansa discuss who will lead the united Stark forces, with each deferring to the other.

Littlefinger reveals to Sansa that his ultimate goal is to sit on the Iron Throne with her at his side. Sansa rejects his offer.

Jon gathers the various Northern lords, the Knights of the Vale, and the Wildlings to plan for the fight against the White Walkers. After Lyanna Mormont shames the Northern lords that did not come to Jon's aid, all lords present declare a reluctant Jon the new King in the North.

=== In Sunspear ===
Olenna Tyrell, devastated after the death of her son and grandchildren, meets with Ellaria and the Sand Snakes concerning the possibility of an alliance against Cersei. Ellaria presents Varys, who offers Olenna vengeance by allying with Daenerys.

=== Beyond the Wall ===
Bran re-enters the vision of Ned Stark at the Tower of Joy. Ned finds Lyanna covered in blood from childbirth. With her dying breath, Lyanna pleads with Ned to protect her son, who is revealed to be Jon Snow.

=== In Meereen ===
Daenerys informs Daario that he will not accompany her to Westeros, as she needs him to keep order in Meereen while she invades Westeros. Daenerys proclaims Tyrion the Hand of the Queen, and the two of them, along with their extensive forces, depart for Westeros.

== Production ==
=== Writing ===
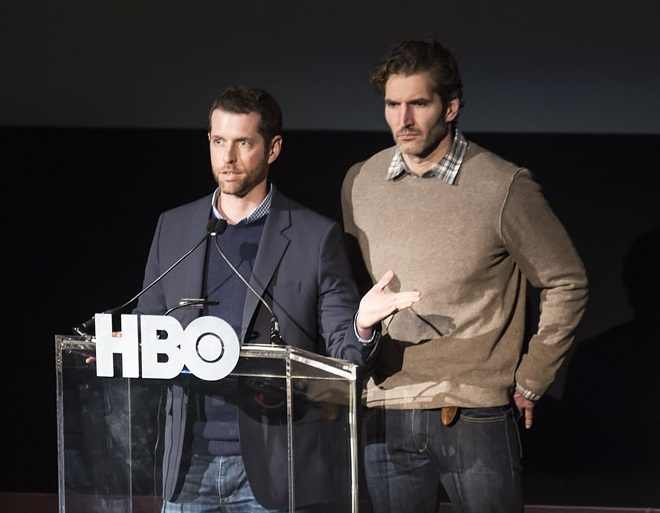
The episode was written by series co-creators David Benioff and D. B. Weiss.

"The Winds of Winter" was written by the series' creators David Benioff and D. B. Weiss. The episode was the longest in the show's history, to that point, with a run time of 68 minutes.

In the "Inside the Episode" segment published by HBO shortly after the airing of the episode, Benioff spoke about the relationship between Sansa Stark and Jon Snow at this point in the season, saying "Over the course of this season they've come to really rely upon each other, but she doesn't really trust him completely. She didn't tell him about the meeting with Littlefinger, she didn't tell him that she summoned the Knights of the Vale, there's definitely a little hint of conflict there. So I think there's a little bit of anger about that and a little bit of jealousy, and that relationship will be crucial to watch." Benioff continued by referencing the declaration of Jon Snow as King of the North, noting "We see the second 'King in the North!' scene with Jon and I think it was important to us that it evoked in that first 'King in the North!' scene. Very different circumstances, different environment. In some ways, the evocation of the first one is meant to be a little worrisome because it was a very triumphant moment when Robb is named King in the North but it didn't go so well for the previous King in the North. So I think we have to be a little worried for Jon and at the same time it's a pretty big reversal and, you know, for a character who was dead at the beginning of the season to be declared king at the end of it. He's done well. He's done well in ten short episodes."

Weiss also noted about the death of King Tommen Baratheon, "Meanwhile, while the explosion is happening, Tommen is alone. This fragile, malleable, devastated child, basically, is sitting there without anybody to comfort him, and if she had been there, he wouldn't have gone out that window. She failed him, and she alone failed him here." Benioff continued about portraying the mindset of Cersei Lannister, saying "I think the idea of Cersei without her children is a pretty terrifying prospect. It was the one thing that really humanized her, you know, her love for her kids. And as much of a monster as she could sometimes be, she was a mother who truly really did love her children, and now those children are gone, and all she's got is power." In a subsequent interview after the episode airing, Weiss stated that Cersei's mindset following the ramifications of this episode will play an important role in the story for the next season.

In an interview with Isaac Hempstead Wright, who portrays Bran Stark in the series, Wright was asked about the significance of Bran witnessing the scene at the Tower of Joy, saying "I don't think Bran knows why this is significant, but he knows that it is significant because he wouldn't have seen it if it wasn't earth-shattering, because everything we've learned so far during his visions has been pretty big and important, from the creation of the first White Walker to the origins of Hodor. This is clearly another important milestone in the history of Westeros. For Bran, he sat there thinking, 'This isn't my brother. This is my cousin somehow, but who's the dad? And why have I been shown this? If I find out who the dad is and why I need to know who the dad is, then let Jon know quick.'" The scene reveals neither Lyanna Stark's son's name nor his father's, with the transition between the newborn's face and Jon Snow's visually conveying the identity. HBO released an infographic shortly after the episode aired, confirming Ned Stark as Jon's guardian, and Lyanna Stark and Rhaegar Targaryen as his parents.

In regards to Arya Stark's transformation following her time as a disciple of the Many-Faced God, Weiss noted in the "Inside the Episode" featurette, "We all see where she's coming from, she's seen so many atrocities. It's a worrisome narrative; she started as this tough and plucky girl and turned into someone who's capable of slitting a man's throat and smiling as she watches him as he bleeds out."

For the final shot of the season, Benioff felt that the shot of Daenerys making her way to Westeros was a monumental part in the series's history, saying "That shot of Dany's fleet making its way out of the Slaver's Bay towards the Narrow Sea and home is probably the biggest thing to happen on the show thus far, that's the thing we've been waiting for since the pilot episode of the first season." He continued, "It hasn't been a smooth road. That's the shot we're going to leave everyone with; it was a real thrill to see her, with Tyrion by her side, heading west."

=== Casting ===
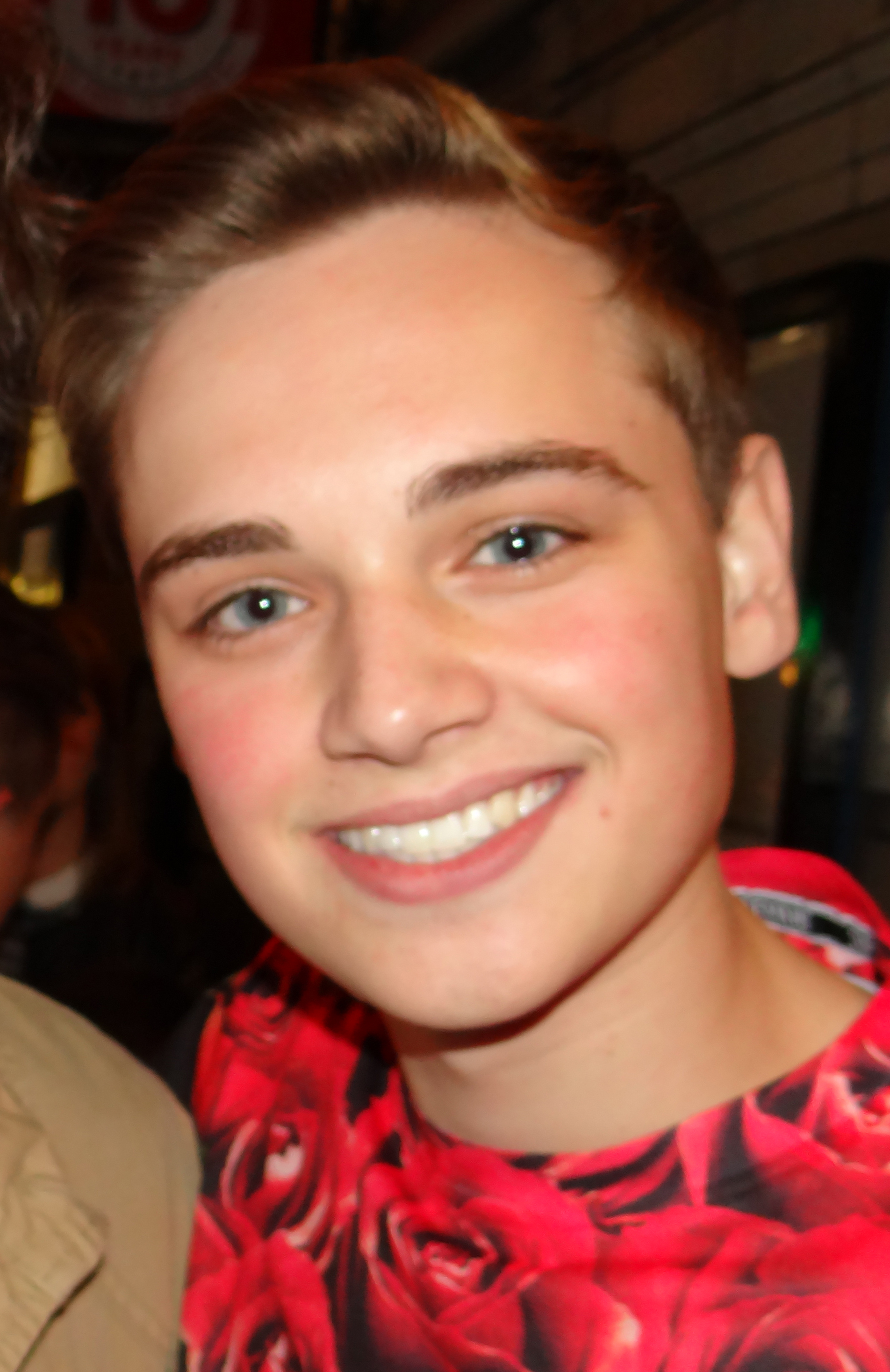
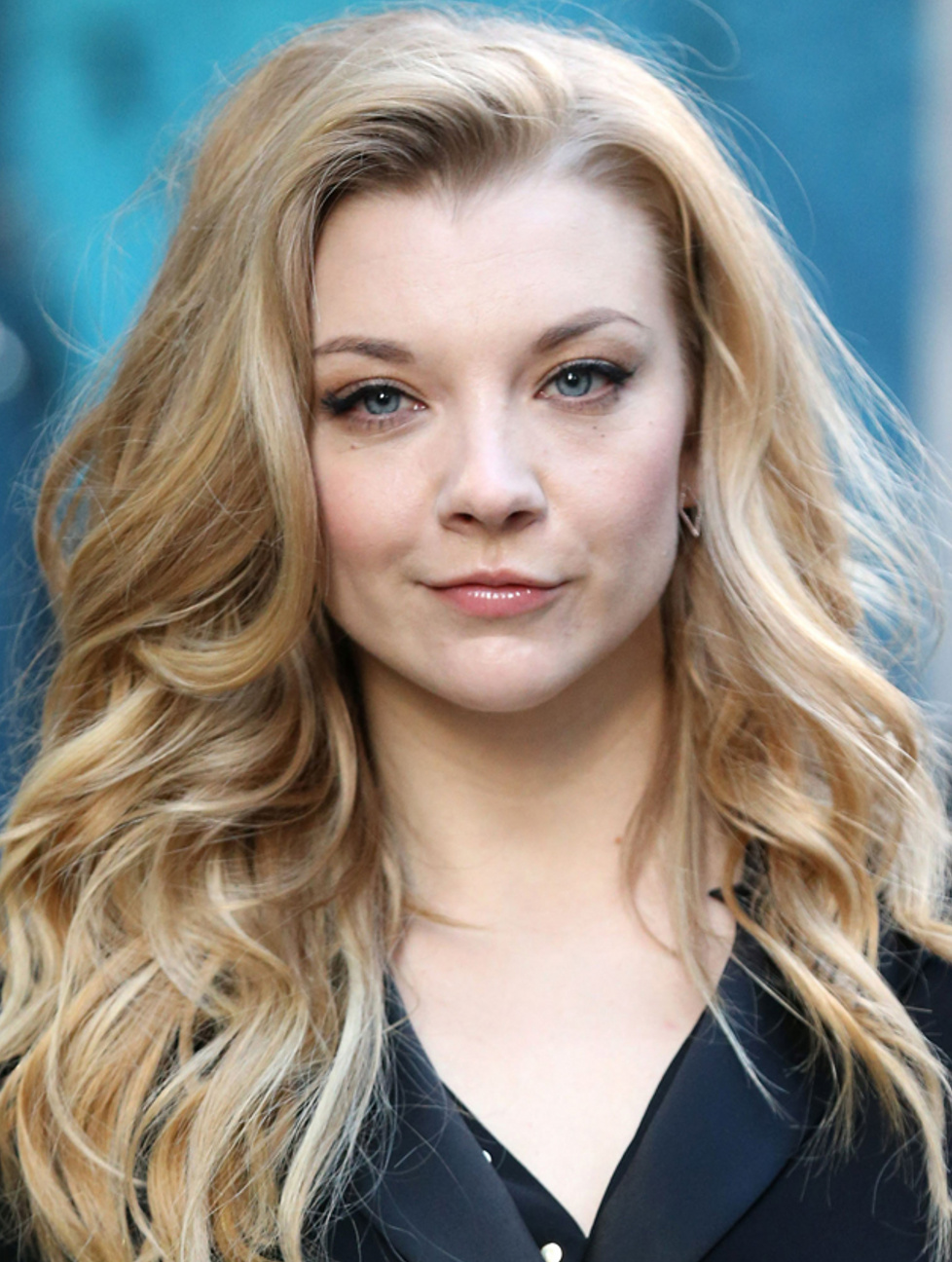
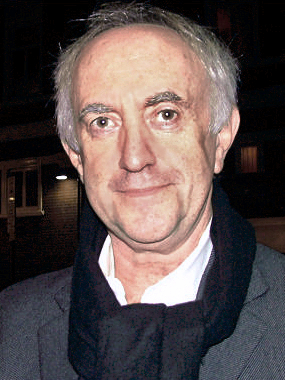
Main cast members Dean-Charles Chapman (left), Natalie Dormer (middle), and Jonathan Pryce (right) made their final appearances in "The Winds of Winter".

"The Winds of Winter" saw the departure of several cast members and recurring guest actors from the series. Notables included Dean-Charles Chapman, whose character, King Tommen Baratheon, commits suicide in the episode. Before appearing in the role of Tommen, which was originally portrayed by actor Callum Wharry, Chapman appeared in the third season of the series as Martyn Lannister, a minor character who was also killed off. Chapman stated that he found out about his character's death the night before the initial table read for the season, saying "I was in my hotel, minding my own business, and I got a phone call. I picked up the phone, and instantly, I knew it was coming. It was David Benioff and Dan Weiss, the two creators of the show, and they stated the facts. But they did it really nice. I couldn't have asked for a better way to have that news broken to me. Them telling me beforehand really helped me out, otherwise I would have been in a state when I read it in the scripts. I probably would have cried."

Actress Natalie Dormer, who was cast to play Queen Margaery Tyrell in the show's second season, also made her final appearance as a main cast member for the series. In contrast to Chapman, Dormer found out about her character's impending death approximately six months before the rest of the cast, saying "I requested while making season 5 that showrunners David Benioff and Dan Weiss release me from working on the show earlier than usual so I could do another project, and they ended up phoning me — and that was The Call. But I got it six months ahead of normal. They were like, 'We weren't going to tell you this for a few more months, but we're not going to release you now, so you can't do that job you really want to do and we're really sorry about that. But on the bright side, we are going to release you proper in the not-so-distant future.' It was good news, bad news — no you can't do this, but don't worry, you're going to have lots more opportunities very soon." Dormer also stated about her departure, "It's the longest time I've ever spent playing a character. I'll always have a little yellow rose after my heart, and I think it was just the right length of time, to be honest. It's time for the Westeros story to move on and it's a perfect time for her to exit."

After appearing as a recurring guest actor in the fifth season, actor Jonathan Pryce was promoted to regular cast member for the sixth season. Prior to being cast as the High Sparrow, Pryce was approached to play another role in one of the previous seasons and refused the part. After being approached with the role of the High Sparrow, Pryce stated that he accepted the role because "If the role hadn't been what it turned out to be for High Sparrow, I probably would not have been involved. I remember starting out and my agent said 'does the character change the situation or is he just a functionary' and this character changes the situation." Pryce added, "Once I started work on Games of Thrones I was incredibly impressed with the organization, the crew and they're really good at their job and story telling so I have become a fan of the show."

Recurring guest actors for the series Eugene Simon, Julian Glover, Roger Ashton-Griffiths, Finn Jones, and Ian Gelder, who portrayed Lancel Lannister, Pycelle, Mace Tyrell, Loras Tyrell, and Kevan Lannister, respectively, also made their final appearance in the series. Finn Jones, who was cast concurrently in the leading role for the upcoming television series Marvel's Iron Fist, spoke about his departure saying, "I had been on Thrones for six years. It was yearly employment. Now I was at a crossroads and I had to think of what the future is. I was very blessed that something like this has come along at the right moment," referring to Iron Fist. Eugene Simon also spoke about his learning of his departure, saying that the showrunners promised a "huge scene" for his character in the season finale, with Simon responding, "for everything that you've done for the last six years, thank you. This is a wonderful way to go. I really, really appreciate it, and I look forward to doing it for you."

For the scene at the Tower of Joy, Lyanna Stark was portrayed by actress Aisling Franciosi. The Danish comedian Frank Hvam portrayed the clerk at the Citadel, although his lines may have been dubbed as he was not a confident English speaker.

=== Filming ===
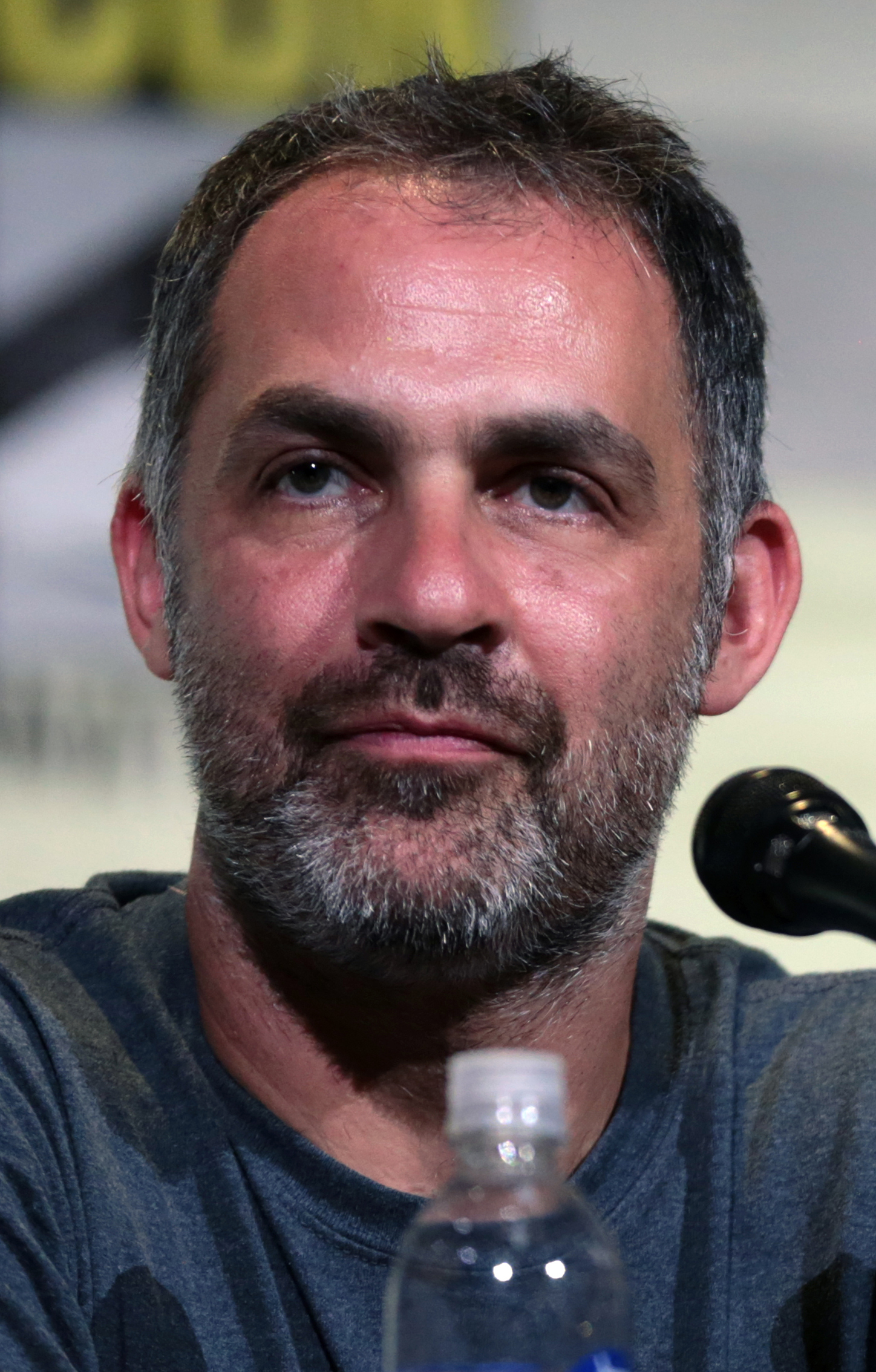
Miguel Sapochnik served as director for the episode, his fourth episode for the series.

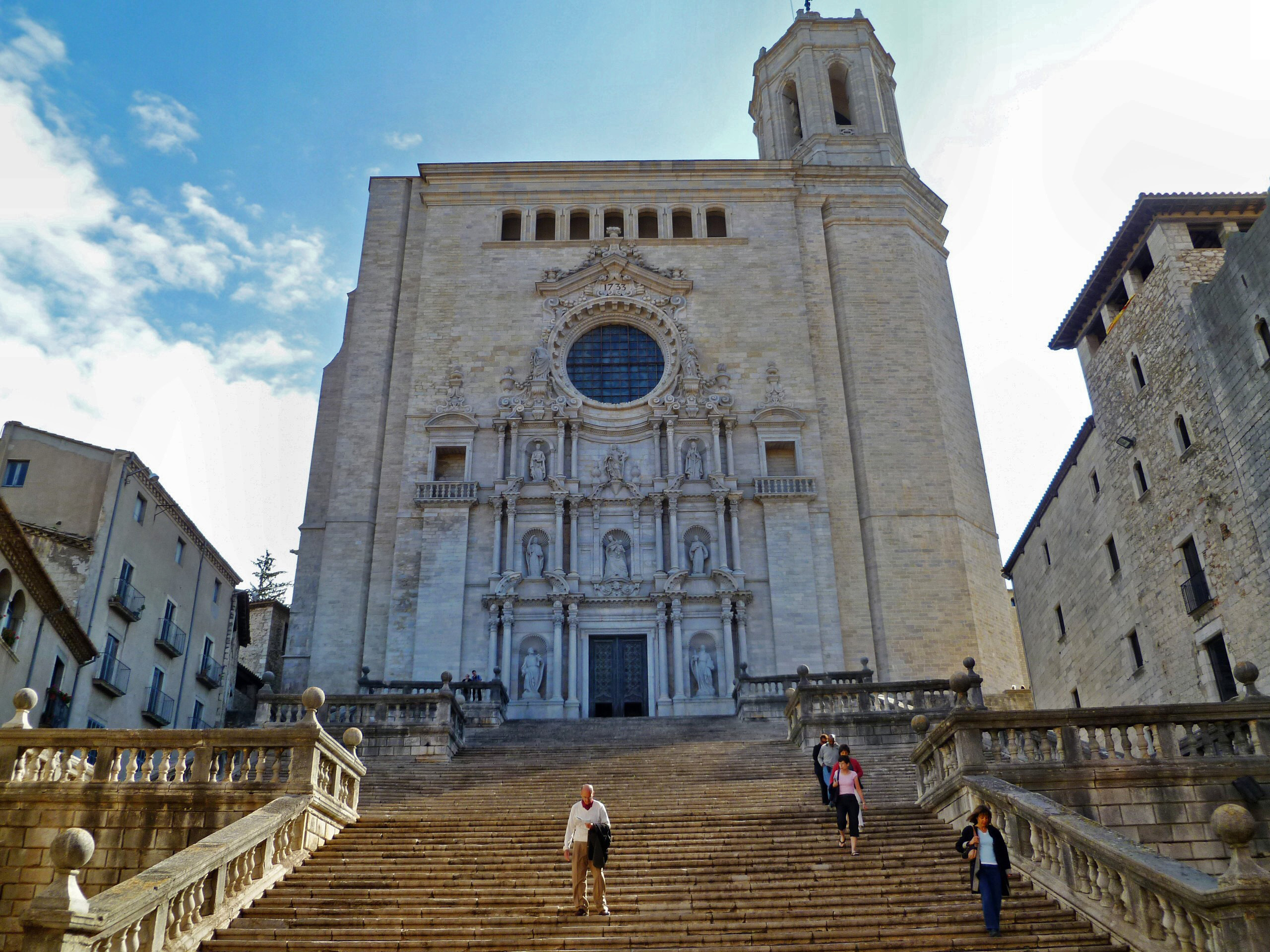
The Cathedral of Saint Mary in Girona, Spain stood in for the exterior shots of the Great Sept, with special effects altering parts of the building.

"The Winds of Winter" was directed by Miguel Sapochnik. He previously directed the fifth season episodes "The Gift" and "Hardhome", and the sixth season episode "Battle of the Bastards". In an interview, Sapochnik spoke about the scenes at the beginning of the episode, which mostly lacked any dialogue, saying "Don't get me wrong, I am a huge fan of smart and witty dialogue. This is something that Game of Thrones is probably quite famous for and rightly so, but I love non-verbal film making more than anything probably." He continued by drawing a comparison to the film Heat starring Robert De Niro, noting "To me, this is truly wonderful filmmaking. And so any opportunity I can get to try my hand at that I welcome. From that perspective, I really hit the jackpot this year and I'm very grateful."

In another interview, Sapochnik revealed that the wildfire explosion at the Sept of Baelor was originally going to only be seen from the outside, but after storyboarding the sequence with shots of the High Sparrow also being engulfed, Sapochnik was able to convince Benioff and Weiss to make the change for the sequence. Sapochnik also stated about the sequence, "The main chunk of the sequence was essentially a courtroom drama and then lots of little scenes surrounding it shot in many different sets and locations and even countries so it took a long time to get all the pieces into the editing system and start actually editing." He also said that the main goal of the scene was to "bring all these intersecting storylines surrounding King's Landing together and end them," and that the music in the scene played an important role in reflecting how the scenes played out on screen tonally, praising Ramin Djawadi's opening score. The Girona Cathedral in Girona, Spain stood in for the exterior shots of the Sept of Baelor.

Dean-Charles Chapman, who portrayed King Tommen Baratheon, spoke about filming his death scene, saying "I was jumping onto a crash mat. Height-wise, I think if I was standing on the floor, it was up to my chest. But the crash mat was pretty thick. I must have done that about 50 times. My face was pretty bruised up. My face took it a little bit." Eugene Simon, who portrayed Lancel Lannister, also spoke about his death scene revealing about his discussions with Sapochnik, "the note was when Lancel was dragging his body, there was a sense of someone who is trying to put aside their pain of being stabbed and being paralyzed as much as possible in order to try to defend what little hope there is left of trying to save the sept and also to save their life. It really only comes down to the very last few nanoseconds of footage that you realize the cause is lost." Simon also stated about the filming of Jonathan Pryce's, who portrays the High Sparrow, final scene, "we had a very big nice round of applause when that took place. I remember that scene very well; we had 200 or so supporting actors in there, all of whom were so committed. They stayed there all day and did wonderful reactions to all the really intense bits. When the first part of the bomb goes off, all of them really, really performed that there was a full-on nuclear explosion going on underneath them." He continued, "We had a big round of applause and celebration after that scene was done because I think we all knew it was going to be pretty monumentous. We said goodbye to countless Tyrells, Kevan Lannister my father, the High Sparrow and dozens of other. It was a pretty extraordinary day." In regards to the non-verbal exchange between Jaime and Cersei Lannister when she is sitting on the Iron Throne, Sapochnik stated "I thought that non-verbal exchange was a very interesting moment but it wasn't clear from the script what exactly Benioff and Weiss wanted. So we just tried a few things, following our noses, drawing from what we knew about these characters and what you see was one of the versions we shot. Interestingly in the edit I still couldn't find a version I felt worked so I actually dropped the moment entirely out of my cut but David and Dan reinstated and to great effect. In fact, I can't really remember the sequence without it anymore. I think he's saying 'don't' and she's saying 'too late.'" He continued "The wonderful thing about filmmaking is you make and remake your film or episode a number of times over the duration of its existence. Firstly in the script stage, second is in prep when you plan how you're going to execute it. Third is in production when you actually get there and have to change everything and finally, in the edit, when you realize what you thought something meant means something totally different when put before or after another juxtaposing or complementary image."

In the same interview, Sapochnik was also asked about how he went about creating a sense of emotion in the 'King in the North' scene, saying "It wasn't hard. I think as fans we'd been waiting for it for so long. That said, it was a very difficult scene to shoot. Mainly because it was unusually hot over the two days we shot it, everyone was wearing heavy furs and armor, Kit was actually pretty ill and everyone was crammed into this space full of plates of sheep's tongues and chicken carcasses so it got quite smelly and sticky. It's also quite a long scene and yet Bella did it probably more than a hundred times, only forgetting a line once in the entire time. When we finished the scene she got a standing ovation from all the cast and crew." Mark Mylod, describing working with Bella Ramsey to the Hollywood Reporter, "She walked in for the casting reading, and we were knocked completely sideways. It was one of those moments where you go, 'Oh my God, what a star.' You could not wish to meet a more delightful young lady. After the first rehearsal, I remember thinking, 'OK, this is going to be a very short rehearsal. She's note perfect.' The accent was awesome, her inflection and her professionalism. ... We ended up rehearsing for only a half hour because she was so on it. And of course, the rest of us felt deeply ashamed, because she knew every single word and every single inflection. We all went home feeling a bit deflated. But also excited! Because the level of talent there is so ridiculous. She's someone we're going to look back on in 20 years, and she's going to be ruling Hollywood. She's just amazing."

Sapochnik was asked in an interview what the most difficult shot was to direct, responding "The final sequence of seeing the armada on its way to Westeros was complicated because it involved so many different ships, and we only had one that we had to redress and shoot again and again. It was also raining and freezing when we shot it, and it was meant to be a Mediterranean climate. Emilia Clarke got so cold, her jaw started shaking uncontrollably and she totally lost her thread as far as what she was meant to be thinking in that moment, the cold will do that. She asked me to help, so I suggested that she just hum the theme to Game of Thrones in her head while we were rolling the cameras, and apparently that worked because it's the take we used in the final cut!"

=== Costuming ===
Costume designer Michele Clapton returned to the series to design Cersei Lannister's gown and crown, among other costumes.

Costume designer Michele Clapton designed most of the newly introduced costumes and jewelry in "The Winds of Winter". Clapton had initially left the series, but returned for the final two episodes of the season to design four different costumes. In an interview, Michele Clapton spoke about the process and meaning behind Cersei Lannister's gown and crown in the season finale. Clapton stated that she had four to five weeks to create the gown, but once she received the script for the episode, she was "immediately sure" of how the dress should look. She stated in the interview, "I knew it had to be leather and I knew it had to be linked to Tywin. I wanted a distinct, strong silhouette, so I squared her shoulders. I also wanted the dress to skim her ankles, so that you could see her feet—again, strength. The silver shoulders are decorated in a similar manner to Jaime's gold hand—the one person that she still has something with." Clapton also noted that every part of the dress represents something, saying, "There is no 'decoration' to Cersei." She stated that she additionally chose to make the dress black in order to represent mourning, as well as a "deadness inside her."

Clapton, in a separate interview, was also asked about the meaning and representation of Cersei's crown, saying "I chose to make it in silver with just wisps of gold to try to show her isolation, her mental disentangling from her family. There is no reference to Baratheon; there is no need anymore. She doesn't have to try and prove a link. The center of the crown is the lion sigil abstracted — its mane represents the Iron Throne, her desire. She has made it her own — she is reborn." Clapton revealed as well that King Tommen Baratheon's costume was intended to show how heavily his responsibilities weigh on him, as he is weighted down with jeweled finery, with Clapton saying "He was a nice boy. Too nice for this."

=== Musical score ===
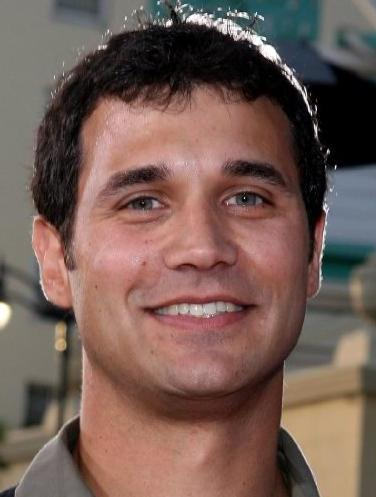
Composer Ramin Djawadi created the episode's musical score.

The musical score for "The Winds of Winter" was composed by Ramin Djawadi. Djawadi has worked on the series since its inception, and additionally composed the show's main theme. In an interview, Djawadi spoke about the score he created for the beginning of the episode, titled "Light of the Seven", which largely consisted of piano, something unusual for the series. Djawadi stated, "The interesting thing to me was the use of the piano. When we started the season, showrunners David Benioff and Dan Weiss, and Miguel Sapochnik, the director of the episode, reached out to me and said, 'There's something coming up in episode 10.' We talked about 'The Light of the Seven', and how it needed to be a new piece of music. Any kind of character theme could tip it, and we didn't want to tip the audience. Miguel brought it up: 'What about the piano?' We discussed it. The piano is not really in the language of the Game of Thrones score."

He continued, "It all felt like a perfect fit. What's great about the scene, too, is there's hardly any dialogue. It's nine minutes long. I knew I had to start minimal and give it space. Let notes ring, then give it space, and build up the anticipation from there, without tipping in either direction." Djawadi stated that he refrained from using the typical Lannister theme, "The Rains of Castamere", in order to create more of a mystery. The piece also featured vocals by two young boys singing in unison, with Djawadi describing how he pieced all of the separate pieces of the music together by saying "The boys I recorded completely separate. The strings I recorded all together. Even the solo instruments, I recorded them separately — the solo violins and solo cellists were recorded separately. The piano, I played. And the organ as well."

Asked in a separate interview about the overall process of composing the music and how it is used in the episode, Djawadi revealed "I sit with David and Dan and we do what's called a spotting session where we watch the entire episode and then discuss when music should start and stop. Everybody's very involved with that. And it constantly gets played with. What I love about Game of Thrones is that the positioning of the music is so well done, because it's not overdone. When the music cuts in, it really has something to say." "Light of the Seven" reached No. 1 on Billboard's Spotify Viral 50 chart on its release.

The episode also featured the show's main theme during the "King in the North" scene with Jon Snow at Winterfell. Critical praise was directed towards the musical score for the episode, with Lili Loofbourow of The Week calling it the "real winner" of the season finale.

== Reception ==
=== Ratings ===
"The Winds of Winter" was viewed by 8.89 million American households on its initial viewing on HBO, significantly higher than the previous week's rating of 7.66 million viewers for the season's penultimate episode "Battle of the Bastards", making it the most watched episode in the series' history, until surpassed by the seventh-season premiere, "Dragonstone". The episode also acquired a 4.35 rating in the 18–49 demographic, making it the highest rated show on cable television of the night, and topping its previous best of 4.0, set twice earlier in the season. In the United Kingdom, the episode was viewed by 2.498 million viewers on Sky Atlantic, making it the highest-rated broadcast that week on its channel. It also received 0.153 million timeshift viewers.

=== Critical reception ===
Game of Thrones concluded what's arguably its best season with one of its finest — and the bloodiest — episodes, "The Winds of Winter", which excelled in dramatic storytelling just as last week's "Battle of the Bastards" raised the bar for action sequences. Though the finale shifted from the battlefield, the events were, if anything, far more seismic, with game-changing revelations and huge moves from every corner of the realm that established some very clear new conflicts going into season 7.

Just look at all that happened in those 69 minutes: Dany set sail for Westeros, Dorne joined forces with both Dany and the Tyrells, Arya returned to Westeros and crossed a major name off her list, Jon became King in the North, and Cersei blew up her enemies and then claimed the Iron Throne for herself. There was death and destruction galore, but it was also rather gleeful death and destruction, as favorite characters mostly got exactly what they wanted.

— James Hibberd, Entertainment Weekly

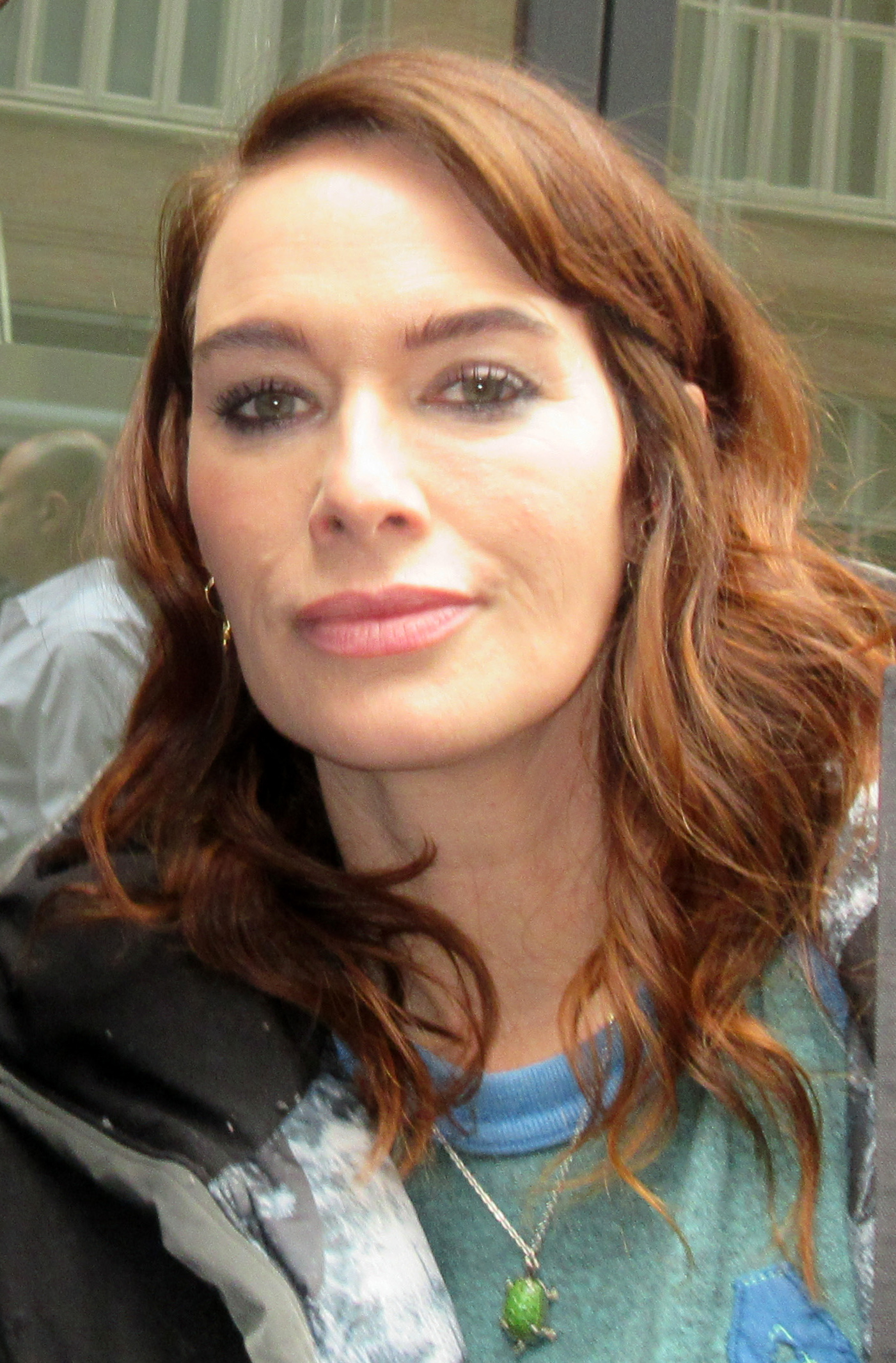
Lena Headey received acclaim for her performance in the finale, receiving her third Primetime Emmy Award nomination. Headey also received her first Golden Globe nomination for the season and the second cast member after Dinklage to have done so.

"The Winds of Winter" received widespread acclaim from both critics and viewers, praising it as one of the series' best episodes. It has received a 99% rating on the review aggregator website Rotten Tomatoes from 58 reviews with an average score of 9.7 out of 10. The site's consensus reads "'The Winds of Winter' makes the most of its extended run time, and is potentially the best season finale in the series' history." The episode had received a perfect 10 out of 10 score on IMDb for several weeks after its release. As of June 23, 2022, it holds a rating of 9.9/10.

Matt Fowler of IGN wrote in his review for the episode "The stories in the North and Meereen stayed a bit quiet as all their action got taken care of last week, leaving Cersei's big plot to destroy the Sept and everyone in it as this finale's big suspenseful and explosive set piece. Elsewhere, there were big reveals and revenge kills that helped everything add up to a very surprising and satisfying season finale." He continued by praising how the trial sequence played out on screen, writing "The actual staging and pacing of the trial and violent reckoning was really cool, with everyone getting dressed and little puzzle pieces falling into place, little birds leading men to their deaths, and Ramin Djawadi's excellent score." He gave the episode a 9.5 out of 10. Michael Calia of The Wall Street Journal similarly gave praise to the episode, writing "It's a good thing ... that the season finale was full of massive developments, tying up several plot threads while leaving some others dangling in the most tantalizing way. This was the most complete episode of Game of Thrones yet, and possibly the best." He also wrote, "Dany and her fleet are finally sailing to Westeros, her great dragons casting shadows over the waves. It's on."

Jeremy Egner of The New York Times also praised the direction of the King's Landing story, and Lena Headey's portrayal of Cersei, saying in his review "Ms. Headey's performance was but one element in a sequence that, technically, ranks among the show's best. Miguel Sapochnik, who directed last week's battle-heavy episode, brought a different kind of precision and urgency to Sunday's installment. Cersei's scheme unspooled amid insistent strings and a series of shots — those vicious little birds taking out Pycelle, Lancel and the dwindling candle-fuse, Margaery's growing concern and rising tension in the Sept — that built inexorably to the High Sparrow's realization that he wasn't as smart as he thought." James Hibberd of Entertainment Weekly stated he felt the episode introduced new conflicts to look forward to in the next season, saying "Though the finale shifted from the battlefield, the events were, if anything, far more seismic, with game-changing revelations and huge moves from every corner of the realm that established some very clear new conflicts going into season 7." Sarah Larson of The New Yorker wrote in her review, "It's a beautiful image. Boats, clouds, sun, dragons, and two female ship captains, pointing their armada toward a Westeros ruled by a queen." Tim Surette of TV.com called the episode, "the best episode ever." Brian Lowry of CNN wrote in his review for the episode, "At this point it's hard to second-guess producers David Benioff and D.B. Weiss, who, working with Martin, have created a series for the ages." Willa Paskin of Slate wrote in his review, "Revenge, a dish Game of Thrones has almost always made taste awful, served hot or cold, became, in the finale, a delicacy. "

=== Accolades ===
Year	Award	Category	Nominee(s)	Result	Ref.
2016	68th Primetime Emmy Awards	Outstanding Costumes for a Period/Fantasy Series, Limited Series or Movie	Chloe Aubry; Michele Clapton; Sheena Wichary	Won	
2016	68th Primetime Emmy Awards	Outstanding Supporting Actress in a Drama Series	Lena Headey	Nominated	
2016	Gold Derby TV Awards 2016	Best Drama Episode		Nominated	
2016	British Society of Cinematographers	Best Cinematography in a Television Drama	Fabian Wagner	Nominated	
2016	International Film Music Critics Association	Film Music Composition of the Year	Ramin Djawadi for "Light of the Seven"	Nominated	
2017	IGN Awards	Best TV Episode		Nominated	
2017	IGN People's Choice Award	Best TV Episode		Won	
2017	69th Writers Guild of America Awards	Episodic Drama	David Benioff; D. B. Weiss	Nominated	
2017	Visual Effects Society Awards 2016	Outstanding Created Environment in an Episode, Commercial or Real-Time Project	Edmond Engelbrecht, Tomoka Matsumura, Edwin Holdsworth, and Cheri Fojtik – Citadel	Nominated	
2017	USC Scripter Award	Best Adapted Screenplay	David Benioff; D. B. Weiss	Nominated	

== See also ==
- "The Rains of Castamere"
- "Mother's Mercy"
- "Light of the Seven"
