= Catch the Throne =

2014 mixtape

Catch the Throne: Volume I

Mixtape by Various artists
- Released: March 7, 2014
- Recorded: 2013–2014
- Genre: Hip hop, rap
- Length: 25:33

Catch the Throne: Volume II

Mixtape by Various artists
- Released: March 7, 2015
- Recorded: 2014–2015
- Genre: Hip hop, rap, heavy metal
- Length: 53:10

Catch the Throne is a two-volume mixtape. The first volume was released digitally on March 7, 2014, and on CD on March 28, 2014, as a free mix tape that features various rap artists to help promote the HBO series Game of Thrones. The albums feature hip hop artists including Snoop Dogg, Ty Dolla $ign, Common, Wale, Daddy Yankee, as well as music by Ramin Djawadi from the show and some voices from the show.

== Reception ==
The album received mostly mixed reviews from critics and fans alike.

== Track listing ==
=== Volume I ===
To help promote the series to a broader audience including multicultural urban youth, HBO commissioned an album of rap songs dedicated to Game of Thrones. Entitled Catch the Throne, it was published for free on SoundCloud on March 7, 2014.

No.	Title	Music	Length
1.	"Mother of Dragons"	Big Boi	2:09
2.	"Iron Throne"	Magazeen	2:26
3.	"Win or Die"	Bodega Bamz	2:21
4.	"Magical Reality"	Kilo Kish	2:32
5.	"Born to Rule"	Daddy Yankee	2:34
6.	"Arya's Prayer"	Dominik Omega	3:20
7.	"The Parallel"	Dee Goodz	3:12
8.	"Fire"	Snow tha Product	1:54
9.	"The Ladder"	Common	2:41
10.	"King Slayer"	Wale	2:24

=== Volume II ===
A second volume of songs was released in March 2015, prior to the beginning of the fifth season of Game of Thrones. This volume again consisted of songs from hip-hop artists, but this time also included contributions from several heavy metal bands. It was released as a free download on iTunes and SoundCloud.

No.	Title	Music	Length
1.	"The Oath"	Method Man	2:33
2.	"Run for Cover"	MNDR	2:56
3.	"Never Back Down"	Ty Dolla $ign	3:52
4.	"Loyalty"	Killswitch Engage	4:07
5.	"Surrender Now"	Kap G	2:52
6.	"Fight Through It"	Melanie Fiona	3:07
7.	"Lannister's Anthem"	Snoop Dogg	2:31
8.	"Marcando Territorio"	Yandel	3:44
9.	"Soror Irrumator"	Anthrax	5:30
10.	"Let Me Go"	Estelle	2:24
11.	"Lord of the Light"	Talib Kweli	2:55
12.	"White Walker"	Mastodon	4:30
13.	"Legends"	Raquel Sofia	3:23
14.	"All Mine"	Stalley	3:58
15.	"Among the Crows"	Mushroomhead	4:48
