= The Rains of Castamere (song) =

Song from A Song of Ice and Fire

Song by The National

from the album Game of Thrones: Season 2
- Released: June 19, 2012
- Recorded: 2011
- Genre: Television soundtrack
- Length: 2:23
- Label: Varèse Sarabande
- Composer: Ramin Djawadi
- Lyricist: George R. R. Martin
- Producer: Ramin Djawadi

"The Rains of Castamere" is a song appearing in the A Song of Ice and Fire novels and in the television series adaptation Game of Thrones. The lyrics were written by George R. R. Martin in the novel A Storm of Swords, published in 2000, and the song was composed by Ramin Djawadi in 2011, upon request from the television series creators David Benioff and D. B. Weiss. The song appears multiple times throughout the books and show.

== Content ==
The song recounts the ruthlessness of the character Tywin Lannister in destroying House Reyne ("the Reynes of Castamere") and House Tarbeck, rebellious vassals of House Lannister, some 40 years before the events of the novels. The stanza of the song that appears in the novels and is adapted for the television series tells of the vassals' defiance – "And who are you, the proud lord said / That I must bow so low?" – and the subsequent extermination of their houses: "But now the rains weep o'er his hall / With no one there to hear."

== Uses ==
The song's lyrics first appear in the novel A Storm of Swords, in which "The Rains of Castamere" is sung or mentioned several times. Late in the novel, the song is performed at the Red Wedding, another massacre of Tywin Lannister's enemies.

In the TV series, the tune is first heard when Tyrion Lannister whistles a small part in the episode "The North Remembers". In the episode "Blackwater", Bronn sings "The Rains of Castamere" with the Lannisters' soldiers. When one of the soldiers asks, "Where'd you learn the Lannister song?", Bronn replies, "Drunk Lannisters." An instrumental version can be heard during Tyrion's speech right after King Joffrey abandons the battlefield in the same episode. The season 2 soundtrack contains a rendition of the song "The Rains of Castamere" by the indie rock band the National, sung by their vocalist Matt Berninger. The song is also played over the end credits of episode "Blackwater".

In season 3, an instrumental version of "The Rains of Castamere" plays over the end credits in episode "The Bear and the Maiden Fair". In episode 9, also titled "The Rains of Castamere", an instrumental version of the song is played by the musicians at the Red Wedding.

In season 4, in episode "The Lion and the Rose", the Icelandic post-rock band Sigur Rós makes a cameo appearance as musicians performing their rendition of "The Rains of Castamere" at Joffrey and Margaery's wedding. Joffrey stops them midway by throwing coins at them. Their version also plays over the closing credits of this episode.

An orchestral rendition of the tune appears as House Lannister's theme throughout seasons 3 and 4, available in the soundtrack as "A Lannister Always Pays His Debts".

A new version of the song was released on the Season 8 soundtrack featuring Serj Tankian of the Armenian-American heavy metal band System of a Down on lead vocals.

== Credits and personnel ==
Personnel adapted from the album liner notes.

- The National – band, primary artist
- Ramin Djawadi – composer, primary artist, producer
- David Benioff – liner notes
- D.B. Weiss – liner notes
- George R.R. Martin – lyricist

== Chart positions ==
Chart (2014)	Peak position
French Singles Sales Chart (SNEP) Sigur Rós version	132

== See also ==
- Game of Thrones Theme
- Music of Game of Thrones
