= Game of Thrones Theme =

"Game of Thrones Main Title Theme"

Single by Ramin Djawadi

from the album Game of Thrones: Season 1
- Released: June 14, 2011
- Recorded: 2011
- Genre: Television soundtrack
- Length: 1:46
- Label: Varèse Sarabande
- Songwriter: Ramin Djawadi
- Producer: Ramin Djawadi

Audio sample
- Game of Thrones's main title theme: file; help

"Game of Thrones Theme", also referred to as "Game of Thrones Main Title Theme", is the theme music of HBO's fantasy television series Game of Thrones and its prequel House of the Dragon, and plays during the title sequences to both shows. It was composed by Ramin Djawadi in 2011, after series creator David Benioff and D. B. Weiss approached him requesting a theme.

Asked to avoid flutes and solo vocals, which the producers felt were overused in fantasy themes, Djawadi used the cello as the lead instrument. The piece begins in a minor key, then switches between corresponding major and minor keys repeatedly. Djawadi was shown a preliminary rendering of the title sequence before composing this music to accompany it. Several artists have covered or parodied the music, sometimes adding lyrics to the originally instrumental work.

The Game of Thrones theme is used as the theme for House of the Dragon starting in the second episode. The theme is also referenced in A Knight of the Seven Kingdoms.

== Composition ==
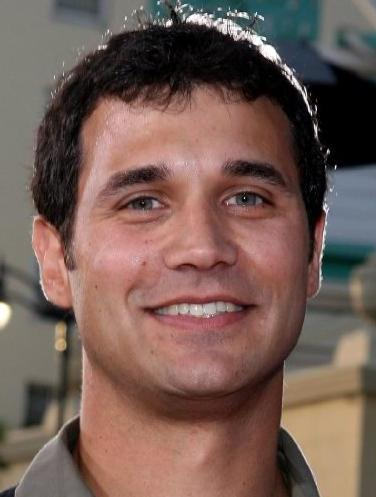
Ramin Djawadi is the composer of the Game of Thrones score.

Ramin Djawadi began composing the music for the show after he had watched the first two episodes of the series that the showrunners David Benioff and D. B. Weiss sent him, and discussed the concepts of the show with them. According to Djawadi, the show creators wanted the main title theme to be about a journey as there are many locations and characters in the show and the narrative involves much traveling. After Djawadi was shown a preliminary animated Game of Thrones title sequence that the visual effect artists were still working on, he was inspired to write the piece. He said that he started humming what would become the theme tune in the car after seeing the visuals for the title sequence, and conceived of the idea for the theme on the drive back to his studio. The finished theme music was presented to the producer three days later.

Djawadi said he intended to capture the overall impression of the show with the theme tune. Cello is featured strongly as Benioff and Weiss wanted to avoid the flutes or solo vocals found in many other productions in the fantasy genre so as to give the show a distinctive sound, and Djawadi chose cello as the main instrument for the music as he thought it has a "darker sound" that suited the show.

Djawadi started with a riff and he built the title theme around the riff. The tune begins with the riff played on strings in a minor key, then changed to a major key after 2 bars, and back to minor again. Djawadi said that he wanted to reflect the "backstabbing and conspiracy" and the unpredictability of the show: "I thought it would be cool to kinda do the same play with the music. So even though the majority of the piece is in minor, there's that little hint of major in there where it kinda switches and then it changes back again." The main melody is then introduced with the cello, joined later by a solo violin that may suggest an interplay between different characters. The melody is then repeated with the entire orchestra. The next section introduces a change in melody, described by Djawadi as giving "a sense of adventure", and continues with a repeat that involves a choir of twenty female voices, recorded in Prague, like the instrumental parts. The title theme ends with a combination of dulcimer and kantele, producing a "shimmery quality" in its sound that Djawadi thought would give a sense of mystery and anticipation for the episode.

The title music is reprised as a global theme in the soundtracks for the series. It may be played occasionally on its own in fragments, sometimes as part of the theme of individual characters or in combination with other pieces of music, and may also be played in large section during particularly important scenes.

== Cover versions and parodies ==
The main theme of Game of Thrones has inspired many tributes and cover versions, including a rendition by the electropop band Chvrches. Lyrics were added for the first time in April 2014 when Element Animation partnered with Mojang Studios for that year's Minecraft April Fools' Day Prank, adding an a cappella rendition of theme (from voice actor Dan Lloyd, in-character as NPC Villagers) to the sandbox game's title screen. Later that August, "Weird Al" Yankovic performed a parody version of the song (with added lyrics) during the 66th Primetime Emmy Awards. In March 2015, FORTE added lyrics based on High Valyrian text for an operatic performance and music video. Some of the cover and parody versions mentioned by news media include:

- a violin version by Jason Yang
- a metal version by Roger Lima
- an electric harp duet version by the "Harp Twins", Camille and Kennerly Kitt
- a chiptune remix in the style of early video game music
- a violin and voice duet by Lindsey Stirling and Peter Hollens
- a cello version by Break of Reality
- a cello version by 2Cellos
- a ska interpretation by Pannonia Allstars Ska Orchestra
- a chamber music version by Aston
- a choral parody used in two episodes of South Park, with lyrics solely about "wieners"
- an elaborate parody of the opening at the beginning of a 2012 episode of The Simpsons, "Exit Through the Kwik-E-Mart"
- a vocal version performed by French musician and singer Luc Arbogast which peaked at number 125 on French Singles Sales Chart in 2014 and stayed there one week
- an a cappella cover version performed by Dan Lloyd (as the Villagers) used for Minecraft's 2014 April Fools' Day Prank, with lyrics solely about "doors"
- a parody performed by "Weird Al" Yankovic at the 2014 Emmy awards
- a bluegrass cover version performed by the Tennessee-based band Flatt Lonesome for SirusXM radio station.

== Credits and personnel ==
Personnel adapted from the album liner notes.

- Ramin Djawadi – composer, primary artist, producer
- David Benioff – liner notes
- D. B. Weiss – liner notes

== Chart positions ==
=== Weekly charts ===
Chart (2014)	Peak position
Belgium (Ultratop Back Catalogue Singles Wallonia)	22
Chart (2015)	Peak position
French Singles Sales Chart (Pure Charts)	131
Chart (2019)	Peak position
French Singles Sales Chart (Pure Charts)	65
French Downloads (SNEP)	65

== See also ==
- Game of Thrones title sequence
- Music of Game of Thrones
