= Ramin Djawadi =

German composer (born 1974)

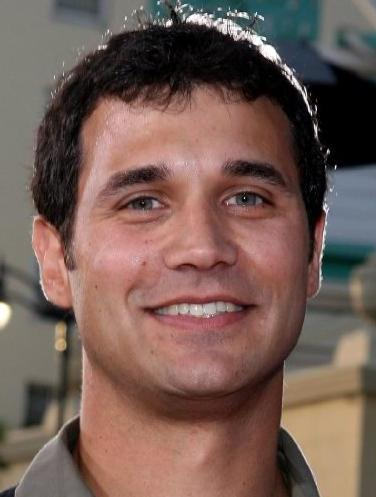
- Djawadi in 2008

Background information
- Born: 19 July 1974 (age 52); Duisburg, North Rhine-Westphalia, West Germany
- Occupations: Film composer, music producer
- Years active: 1998–present
- Label: WaterTower Music
- Website: ramindjawadi.com

Ramin Djawadi (born 19 July 1974) is a German film score composer based in the United States. He is known for his scores for Iron Man, Pacific Rim, and the HBO series Game of Thrones and Westworld.

After graduating from the Berklee College of Music in Boston, Djawadi apprenticed at Hans Zimmer's Remote Control Productions before becoming an independent composer. He has scored films such as Clash of the Titans, Warcraft, A Wrinkle in Time and Eternals; as well as television series including HBO Game of Thrones prequel series House of the Dragon, 3 Body Problem, Prison Break, Person of Interest, Jack Ryan and Fallout. He has also composed music for the video games of Medal of Honor franchise, Gears of War franchise and System Shock 2.

He has won two Emmy Awards (both for Game of Thrones), one Annie Award (for Win or Lose), three Grammy nominations and seven Emmy nominations. He was awarded the BMI Icon Award at Broadcast Music Inc.'s 40th annual Film, TV and Visual Media Awards in 2024.

== Early life ==
Djawadi was born in Duisburg, Germany to an Iranian father and a German mother. He went to Krupp-Gymnasium in Duisburg, West Germany and studied at Berklee College of Music.

== Career ==
After graduating from Berklee College of Music in 1998, Djawadi received a job at Hans Zimmer's music company Remote Control Productions. Djawadi moved to Los Angeles and worked as an assistant to Klaus Badelt. From there on he made additional music and arrangements for Badelt and Zimmer movies, such as Pirates of the Caribbean: The Curse of the Black Pearl, The Time Machine, and the Academy Award-nominated film Something's Gotta Give. He co-composed the music for System Shock 2 (1999). In 2003, he and Badelt composed the score of Beat the Drum.

In 2004, Djawadi went out on his own with Blade: Trinity, collaborating with RZA for director David S. Goyer. This was the beginning of his relationship with Goyer for both film and television. The following year, Djawadi continued making additional music for Zimmer in films such as Batman Begins and The Island, which was his last time working in the background of another composer. The same year, he composed the Emmy-nominated main title themes and scores for Prison Break and the related show Breakout Kings.

In 2006, Djawadi scored the first Sony Pictures Animation project, Open Season, followed by the sequel Open Season 2. In 2007 Djawadi scored "Fly Me To The Moon", the first full-length animation film to be released solely in 3D (2008) by the Belgian nWave Studios. He subsequently scored 6 more films with Belgian director Ben Stassen: Sammy's Adventure, Samy II, African Safari 3D and House of Magic, Robinson Crusoe, and Queen's Corgi. Djawadi's ethereal score for the film Mr. Brooks (2007) earned him a World Soundtrack Award for Discovery of the Year nomination. His other scores include Deception, Robert Towne's Ask the Dust, and Iron Man. Djawadi was nominated for Grammy Award for Best Score Soundtrack for Visual Media for his work on Iron Man.

Djawadi wrote the score for Goyer's horror thriller The Unborn (2009), produced by Michael Bay. Djawadi collaborated with Goyer on the television show FlashForward than year, earning him his second Emmy nomination. In 2010, Djawadi completed Warner Brothers' Clash of the Titans. The same year, he scored the soundtrack for the video game Medal of Honor.

In 2011, he was selected to score HBO's fantasy drama Game of Thrones. His work on Game of Thrones has garnered him several industry awards and recognition including a Primetime Emmy Award for Outstanding Music Composition for a Series in September 2018 for the score "The Dragon and the Wolf". For his work on season 7, he was nominated for the Grammy Award for Best Score Soundtrack for Visual Media. This was his second nomination in this category after being nominated before for Iron Man in 2009. In 2011, he worked on the CBS crime drama Person of Interest.

In 2012, he wrote the score for American action thriller film Safe House.

In 2013, Djawadi composed for the science fiction film Pacific Rim. He scored FX's vampire drama The Strain, created by Pacific Rim director Guillermo del Toro.

In 2014, Djawadi wrote the score for an American action horror film Dracula Untold.

In 2016, Djawadi composed for the fantasy film Warcraft and the HBO science fiction show Westworld. The same year, Djawadi composed the score for the fantasy action monster film The Great Wall.

In 2017, Djawadi composed the music for American survival drama film The Mountain Between Us.

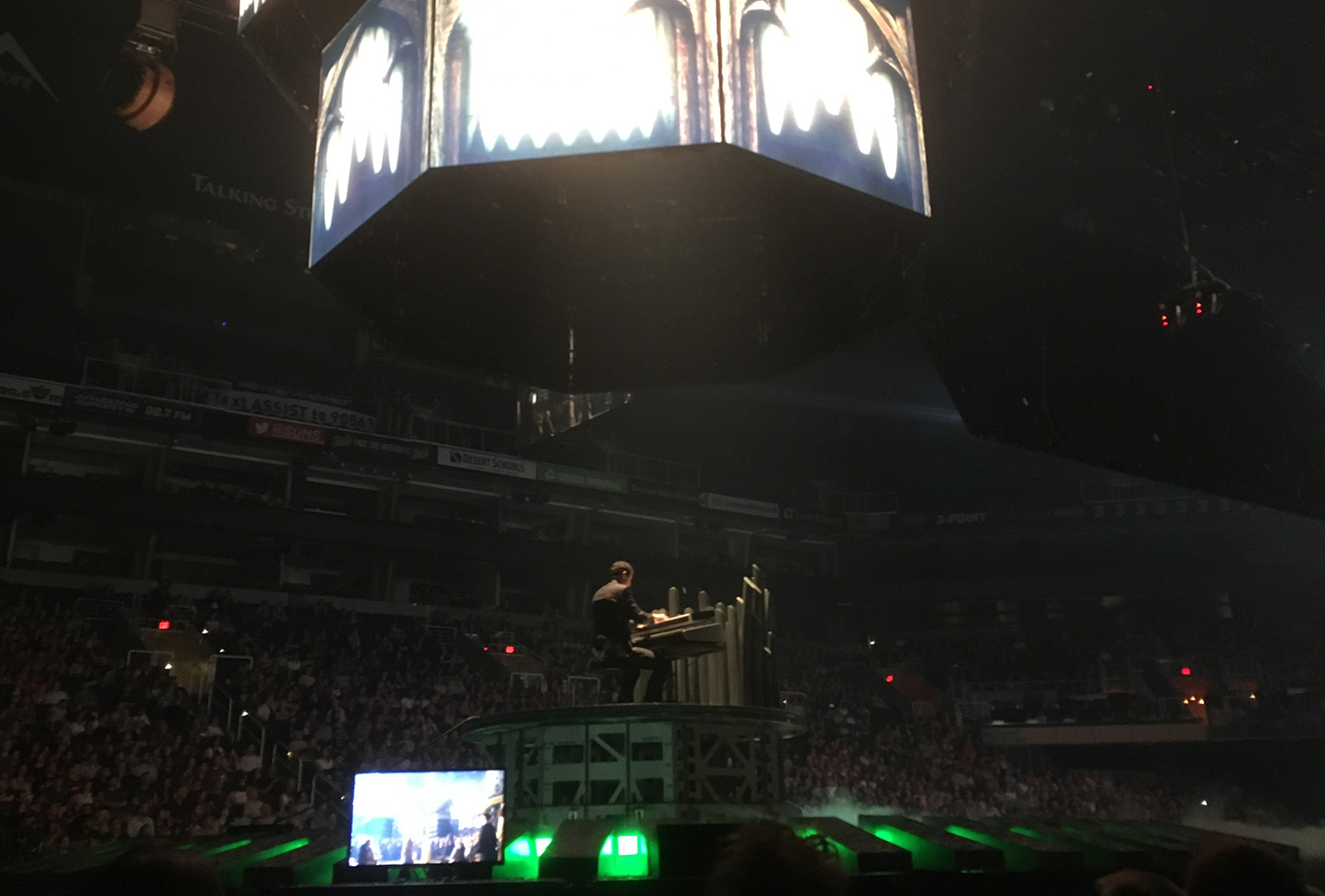
Djawadi performing in 2017

In 2018, Djawadi scored American science fantasy adventure film A Wrinkle in Time and American supernatural horror film Slender Man.

He wrote the music for Amazon Prime Video's political action thriller television series Tom Clancy's Jack Ryan (also known simply as Jack Ryan).

Djawadi scored The Queen's Corgi, an animation film directed by frequent collaborator Ben Stassen. He co-wrote "Hollow Crown" alongside Ellie Goulding in For the Throne: Music Inspired by the HBO Series Game of Thrones. In 2019, he won his second Emmy Award in a row for the Game of Thrones episode "The Long Night".

In 2019, Djawadi returned to the Gears of War series to compose the music for Gears 5.

He received a third Grammy Award nomination for his work in season 8 of Game of Thrones, in the Best Score Soundtrack for Visual Media category.

Djawadi composed the score for the 2021 Marvel Studios film Eternals, which marked his return to the Marvel Cinematic Universe (MCU) since 2008's Iron Man. Djawadi composed music for the trailer of Magic: The Gathering: Theros Beyond Death, a card game. Djawadi co-composed music with Brandon Campbell for the second episode of Apple TV+'s series Amazing Stories titled "The Heat". He composed music for the Disney+'s nature documentary film Elephant. Djawadi composed the score for Lisa Joy's feature film debut Reminiscence. He also co-composed the music for the Amazon Game's New World with Brandon Campbell.

He scored the music for Ruben Fleischer's Uncharted based on the videogame franchise of same name. He reunited with Game Of Thrones creator D.B Weiss and Tom Morello, scoring the Netflix film, Metal Lords, directed by Peter Solliet. He scored Sony's The Man from Toronto, directed by Patrick Hughes and the Game of Thrones prequel series, House of the Dragon.

In 2023, he composed the music for the first season of American series 3 Body Problem, which premiered on Netflix on 21 March 2024. The accompanying soundtrack, titled 3 Body Problem (Soundtrack from the Netflix Series), was released on Apple Music on 15 March 2024, and subsequently on YouTube Music under the same name in March 2024. Djawadi re-teamed with Person of Interest and Westworld creators, Jonathan Nolan and Lisa Joy for Fallout, Amazon Prime's adaptation of Bethesda Studio's famous video game franchise.

He was honored with BMI Icon Award at the 40th BMI Film, TV and Visual Media Awards in 2024 for his “memorable scores and themes inspiring future generations of composers,” BMI president-CEO Mike O'Neill said in presenting the award.

In 2025, Djawadi scored Pixar's Win or Lose, with the duo, CAMPFIRE, writing all the original songs for the show based on Djawadi's themes.

== Personal life ==
Djawadi is married to Jennifer Hawks, a music executive and music supervisor in the film industry. They live with their twin children in Los Angeles. According to Djawadi, he experiences the perceptual phenomenon known as synesthesia whereby he may "associate colours with music, or music with colours", and it allows him to visualize music.

== Tours ==
- Game of Thrones Live Concert Experience (2017–2019)

== See also ==
- Music of Game of Thrones
- Music of the Marvel Cinematic Universe
- List of people with synesthesia
