= Blimp (disambiguation) =

A blimp is an airship without an internal supporting framework or keel.

Blimp may also refer to:

== Device ==
- Barrage balloon, a balloon used to support a steel cable as an anti-aircraft measure
- Blimp, a large, hollow windscreen put on a microphone to cut wind noise
- Sound blimp, a housing attached to a camera which reduces sounds

== Arts and entertainment ==
- The Blimp, a rock band formed in 1998 in Glasgow, Scotland
- Blimp Levy (c. 1903–1961), professional wrestler
- The Blimp, member of parody superhero team the Inferior Five
- "The Blimp (mousetrapreplica)", a song from the 1969 album Trout Mask Replica by Captain Beefheart

== See also ==
- Colonel Blimp (disambiguation)
