= Alan Fletcher =

Alan Fletcher is the name of:

- Alan Fletcher (footballer) (1917–1984), British footballer
- Alan Fletcher (artist) (1930–1958), Scottish painter and sculptor
- Alan Fletcher (graphic designer) (1931–2006), British graphic designer
- Alan Fletcher (composer) (born 1956), American composer
- Alan Fletcher (actor) (born 1957), Australian actor
- Alan Fletcher (politician) (1907–1991), Australian politician
