= Bradie Tennell =

American figure skater (born 1998)

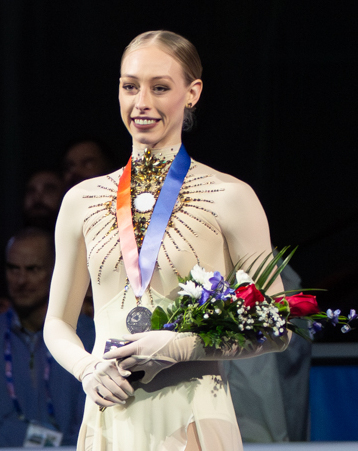
- Bradie Tennell during the medal ceremony at the 2026 U.S. Championships

Personal information
- Born: January 31, 1998 (age 28) Winfield, Illinois, U.S.
- Home town: Cary, Illinois, U.S.
- Height: 5 ft 6 in (1.68 m)

Figure skating career
- Country: United States
- Discipline: Women's singles
- Coach: Benoit Richaud; Jeremy Allen
- Skating club: Skating Club of New York
- Began skating: 2000
- Highest WS: 4th (2019–20)

Medal record
Event	Gold medal – first place	Silver medal – second place	Bronze medal – third place
Olympic Games	0	0	1
Four Continents Championships	0	1	1
U.S. Championships	2	2	1
World Team Trophy	1	1	0
Medal list
Olympic Games
Bronze medal – third place	2018 Pyeongchang	Team
Four Continents Championships
Silver medal – second place	2025 Seoul	Singles
Bronze medal – third place	2020 Seoul	Singles
U.S. Championships
Gold medal – first place	2018 San Jose	Singles
Gold medal – first place	2021 Las Vegas	Singles
Silver medal – second place	2019 Detroit	Singles
Silver medal – second place	2023 San Jose	Singles
Bronze medal – third place	2020 Greensboro	Singles
World Team Trophy
Gold medal – first place	2019 Fukuoka	Team
Silver medal – second place	2021 Osaka	Team

Bradie Tennell (born January 31, 1998) is an American figure skater. She is a 2018 Olympic team event bronze medalist, the 2025 Four Continents silver medalist and 2020 Four Continents bronze medalist, a four-time Grand Prix medalist, an eight-time Challenger Series medalist, and a two-time U.S. national champion (2018, 2021).

Tennell began skating when she was two years old, even though she learned to walk late and had to wear orthotics in her shoes to correct a pronation problem in her feet. Her first rink was in Crystal Lake, Illinois. She began working with coach Denise Myers when she was nine, up until August 2020. Tennell won her first competition at age ten as a juvenile and rose up the ranks, becoming a senior-level skater in November 2016. She spent the 2015–2016 and 2016–2017 seasons recovering from a back injury but came back in 2017, winning the gold medal at the 2018 U.S. Nationals and competing at the 2018 Olympics.

== Personal life ==
Bradie Tennell was born on January 31, 1998, in Winfield, Illinois. Her mother, Jean Tennell, was a registered nurse and single mother. Her two younger brothers were hockey players. When Tennell was 16, her parents had a "bitter divorce"; her father is in her two brothers' lives, but Bradie has cut all ties with him.

Tennell began skating when she was two years old, when she would greet her mother when she returned home after an overnight shift and beg her to take her to the ice rink. Tennell's first rink was in Crystal Lake, Illinois, not far from her home in Carpentersville, Illinois. Tennell and her brothers were home-schooled and took online courses. When Tennell was seven years old, she drew a picture of herself atop an Olympic podium, flanked by her role models Michelle Kwan and Kristi Yamaguchi. When Tennell was ten, she began working with Denise Myers. Tennell skated most of her life at a rink in Buffalo Grove, Illinois, where she also gave lessons to young skaters before beginning her own training, even after competing nationally. In 2018, she was taking courses at a local community college, to prepare for a possible career in the health field.

== Career ==
=== Early career ===
Tennell won her first competition when she was ten years old. In 2010, at the age of 12, she came in first place at the Upper Great Lakes Regionals, which qualified her to compete as a juvenile at the 2010 U.S. Junior Nationals, where she came in 10th place. Her goals for the following season was to perfect her double axel and return to junior Nationals. In 2011, she came in third place in the intermediate division at the Upper Great Lakes Regionals and 15th place at the U.S. Junior Championships, again as an intermediate. In 2012, as a novice, she came in third place at both the Midwestern Sectionals and the 2012 Upper Great Lakes Regionals. She competed, also as a novice, at the 2012 U.S. Championships in San Jose, California, where she came in tenth place overall, after earning 32.60 points and coming in tenth place in her short program and 68.78 points in her free skate.

Tennell came in second place overall as a novice at the 2013 Midwestern Sectionals, coming in first place after the short program with 46.05 points and coming in fourth place after the free skate with 72.95 points. She won the gold medal at the Upper Great Lakes Regionals, also as a novice. She won the bronze medal, her first "notable medal", at the 2013 U.S. Nationals, again in the novice division, even though she had only two triples in her free skate, which was set to music from The Nutcracker. She opened her program with a triple Salchow but fell while attempting a triple toe loop. She successfully executed three triple jumps, coming in fourth place in the free skate and earning 116.91 points overall. Tennell came in second place at the 2014 Midwestern Sectionals as a junior. She came in fourth place at the 2014 U.S. Nationals and second place at the Gardena Spring Trophy, again as a junior.

=== 2014–15 season: Breakout season ===
Tennell began the 2014–2015 season by competing at the Nagoya TV Cup in Japan; she came in eighth place, coming in fourth place in the short program, eighth place in the free skate, and earning 144.89 points overall. She also came in second place at the 2015 Midwestern Sectionals. At the 2015 U.S. Championships, in what NBC Sports called her "breakout moment", and in what Jeré Longman from The New York Times called a "career advancement", she won the gold medal as a junior "by blowing away the field" with a "near-perfect" free skate, earning 16 points more than the second-place finisher. Tennell later said that although she was well-trained, she went into the competition not expecting to win. She also considered her win at Nationals the first step to competing in the 2018 Winter Olympics; as Philip Hersh stated, "Both the 2012 junior champion, Gracie Gold, and the 2013 junior champion, Polina Edmunds, had made the 2014 U.S. Olympic team, so a similar progression for Tennell seemed realistic". Three months after Nationals, Tennell fractured both wings of a lumbar vertebra and had to spend the summer of 2015 in a back brace.

=== 2015–16 season: Struggles with injuries ===
Tennell began the 2015–2016 season by coming in 11th place at the Junior Grand Prix Cup of Austria; she came in ninth place in the short program and 13th place in the free skate, earning a total of 124.54 points. She won both her sectional and regional competitions, which qualified her for the 2016 U.S. Championships. She came in sixth place at her senior debut at the U.S. Nationals, earning a spot at the World Junior championships, where she came in 11th place overall, after falling three times during her free skate. At Worlds, she came in fourth place in the short program and 14th place in the free skate, earning 147.52 points overall. In June 2016, Tennell had the same back injury as the year before, but to a different vertebra.

=== 2016–17 season: Coming back ===
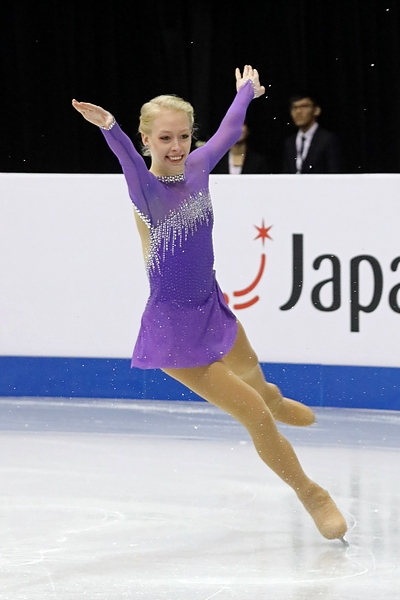
Tennell at the 2017 Junior Worlds Championships

Tennell was again in a back brace and off the ice for three months in the summer of 2016 while undergoing intense physical therapy. She was not able to return to the ice until early September 2016. Sean Jacobs of NBC called this period "dark days" for Tennell, who said that wearing a back brace was "very tough". Tennell also said that her mother helped her not give up and to "put things in perspective". She redoubled her off-ice recovery efforts, attempting fewer jumps and taking more physical therapy and Pilates to lessen the chance of future back injuries so that she could come back for the 2016–2017 season. She competed, but the season, along with the 2015–2016 season, "were largely lost" because she was not able to train properly. She later told Time magazine that not being able to skate for months at a time was "not very pleasant or fun for me". She also said that the experience reinforced her love for figure skating and gave her a renewed sense of motivation. Her coach Denise Myers praised Tennell for her tenacity, later saying, "Even when she was injured, it wasn't a matter of if she was coming back, it was a matter of when she was coming back".

Tennell struggled throughout the season; 48 other skaters had higher season's-best scores than her, including seven from the U.S., and she earned 14 points less than the next-highest scoring female American skater. She missed six months of competition over two years, but made her senior international debut in November 2016, at the 2016 Tallinn Trophy, where she came in third place. She had four months to prepare for the 2017 U.S. Championships and came in a "disappointing" ninth place. At the 2017 World Junior Championships, she came in seventh place in both her short program and free skate, coming in seventh place overall and earning a total of 161.36 points.

=== 2017–18 season: Olympic team bronze and first Grand Prix medal ===
Going into the 2017–2018 season, it was the first time Tennell was injury free since the 2014–2015 season. Reporter Nick Patterson called the season "the stuff of childhood fantasies" for Tennell. She began the season as a relative unknown, even within the U.S., but ended the year as a U.S. champion, an Olympic medalist, and "one of the biggest names in American skating". Reporter Philip Hersh called her success "a flight of fancy". Chelsea Janes of the Washington Post said that Tennell overcame her previous injuries and "the inconsistency that so often follows them". Competing at the 2018 Olympics was a goal, although Tennell told reporters throughout the season that she preferred to focus on one competition at a time because thinking about making the U.S. team could be overwhelming for her.

The music to Tennell's short program, choreographed by Scott Brown, was selections from the popular Korean film Taegukgi, a piece of music that was well-known and beloved in Korea. Tennell said that she "fell in love with how powerful" the piece was after a friend recommended it to her. Her coach called the music "a conscious choice", since the 2018 Olympics were in Korea. Her free skate was set to the "Cinderella" soundtrack. Hersh, however, called Tennell's programs "choreographically callow".

Tennell's first event of the season was the 2017 Philadelphia Summer International in early August 2017; she came in first place with a successful triple Lutz-triple toe in both of her programs, which earned her an invitation to Skate America. She came in second place in both the short program and the free skate in Philadelphia and earned 184.98 points overall. Tennell came in fourth place overall at the 2017 Lombardia Trophy, with 196.70 points, coming in fifth place in the short program, third place in the free skate, and beating 2014 Olympic bronze medalist Carolina Kostner of Italy and 2015 world champion Elizaveta Tuktamysheva of Russia.

Going into the 2017 Skate America, her first Grand Prix event as a senior skater, Tennell was "little more than an afterthought" in international figure skating. She competed against three-time U.S. national champion Ashley Wagner and former World Championship medalists Gabrielle Daleman of Canada, Satoko Miyahara of Japan, and Alena Leonova of Russia. She performed two "flawless routines" and came in third place overall; she and Wagner were the only two American women to win Grand Prix medals (both bronze) during the season. Her short program score, 67.01 points, was a personal best.

Tennell "shone" in her free skate, skating a clean program and successfully executing seven triple jumps (four in combination), and earning Level 4 marks for her spins. She earned 137.09 points, also a new personal best. She earned 204.10 points overall, the highest international score by an American woman since Wagner earned 215.39 points at the 2016 World Championships. She was the first U.S. female single skater to win a medal at her first Grand Prix for ten years, since Caroline Zhang in 2007. Tennell's win at Skate America also put her into contention for the U.S. Olympic team, but when she was asked about the possibility that she could compete at the Olympics, her coach Denise Myers said that Tennell had not yet reached her peak. Myers also said that Tennell did so well because she had successfully overcome her past injuries and that when she was healthy, she tended to excel. Tennell was pleased with her performances at Skate America but went home with the goal of working on fine-tuning both her programs for Nationals, including earning Level 4 scores on both step sequences.

At the U.S. Championships, Tennell skated "two more flawless routines" largely due to her jumping and technical abilities, which helped her earn the maximum number of technical points. Reporter Chelsea Janes called Tennell's short program "an unexpected coronation" for Tennell and made her "a legitimate contender" for the U.S. Olympic team. She was in first place after the short program, with Mirai Nagasu seven-tenths of a point behind her in second place, Karen Chen in third place, and Wagner in fifth place. Tennell received a standing ovation from the audience with her "masterfully executed jumps and aggressive, tight spins". Her step sequences were aggressive and effective but less polished than Wagner's. Tennell earned 73.79 points during her short program, the highest-scoring women's short program at U.S. Nationals up to that point.

Janes, about Tennell's free skate, said that Tennell was "peaking at just the right moment" and that she "showcased to perfection", although Janes felt that Tennell needed "more polish in the nuanced aspects of performance-based scores". Jeré Longman of the New York Times, who called Tennell "a most improbable American champion" and "self-possessed and unexcitable", also called Tennell's free skate "a composed, nearly flawless performance as Cinderella". She executed her triple Lutz-triple toe loop combination "with metronomic precision". She came in first place after her free skate by almost five points with a career-best score of 219.51 points, again beating Nagusu, who came in second place in the free skate. Longman, who reported that Tennell had successfully completed every triple jump she had attempted for three competitions, also said that she handled the pressure of possibly qualifying for the Olympics with no outward sign of nervousness. Tennell won her first Nationals gold medal; Nagusu won the silver medal, and Chen won the bronze medal. All three were named to the U.S. Olympics team. According to reporter Philip Hersh, Tennell was chosen because whereas she had excelled all season, her competitors had not. She was also able to make up for her struggles the previous season. Reporter Christine Brennan called choosing Tennell instead of Wagner, a more well-known, established, and experienced skater despite her fourth-place finish at Nationals, "a gamble" for U.S. Figure Skating. The 2018 Games were Tennell's first Olympics. United Airlines paid for her mother and two brothers to travel to PyeongChang to watch her compete, after the company discovered that the family had set up a GoFundMe page to raise money for the trip. She came into the Olympics as a "long shot", although Gary D'Amato of the Milwaukee Journal Sentinel called Tennell "the dark horse" of the Olympics.

Tennell skated a clean and error-free short program for the team competition. She had the support of the Korean audience due to the Korean piece of music she used. She successfully completed her first and hardest jump combination, a triple Lutz-triple toe loop, as well as every other jump in her program. She continued her consistency with her "textbook technique and reliability in landing jumps". She received lower scores for her choreography, skating skills, and transitions compared to more experienced skaters like Kaetlyn Osmond from Canada and Carolina Kostner from Italy. She came in fifth place out of ten competitors, earning 68.94 points and helping the U.S. win a bronze medal in the team event. Tennell said that she was happy with her performance: "I don't think I could have asked for a better first program at the Olympics".

In the individual event, Tennell was placed in the first warm-up group based on her world ranking; out of 30 competitors, she was first to skate the short program. Despite completing every jump during practice, she fell for the first time all season during the short program, 30 seconds into the program. She was able to hold onto a poor landing on the opening jump of her combination, the triple Lutz, but fell on the second jump, the triple toe loop. Tennell said later that she could not remember the last time she fell; she was the only skater at the Olympics who had not had a fall in previous competitions, and she had not fallen in the previous 34 jumping passes competed in four competitions earlier in the season. She recovered and skated the rest of her program cleanly, including a triple loop and double Axel, and remained in first place for over two hours. She came in 11th place after the short program and earned 64.01 points. Tennell rebounded with a strong free skate, coming in ninth place. She came in ninth place overall, with 192.35 points, the highest placement among her American teammates. After her performances, Tennell received a call from Peggy Fleming, and Scott Hamilton praised her for her mental toughness. Tara Lipinski called her "a machine" and said that she had "nerves of steel".

When Tennell returned home, she began training for the 2018 World Championships immediately. She appeared, for the first time, in a parade in East Dundee, Illinois, near her hometown of Carpentersville. Tennell came in seventh place in the short program, with 68.76 points, came in fourth place in the free skate, with 131.13 points. She ended the season with "a full and physically demanding" tour with Stars on Ice.

=== 2018–19 season: "Under construction", Grand Prix bronze ===
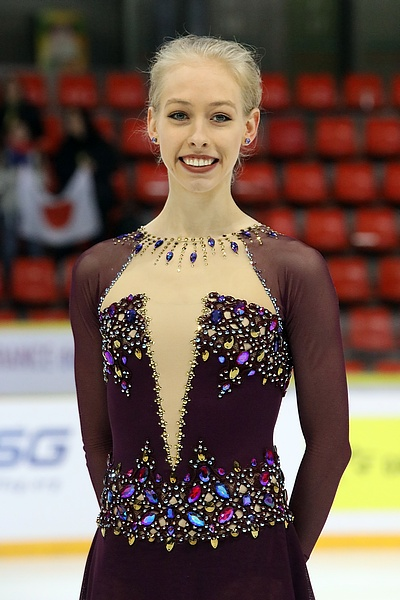
Tennell at the 2018 Internationaux de France

Tennell started the 2018–2019 season by attending U.S. Figure Skating's Champs Camp, a training camp for elite skaters, in August 2018; she said while there: "I want to be a whole new skater, unrecognizable from last season". She also worked on being more expressive, less shy, and allowing her personality to come through in her skating. Her choreographer Benoit Richaud said that as of 2018, she was "still under construction" and that she needed to build upon her technical abilities. Her programs were more challenging, with fewer and more difficult transitions. She also added a triple Lutz-triple loop combination in both her short program and free skate and a triple Lutz-triple toe in her free skate and worked to improve her edges on her triple flip. Reporter Karen Rosen stated that Tennell competed "with an intensity" missing from the previous season.

In her short program, Tennell chose music from the 2014 film Lucy, a song called "Rebirth" performed by Hi-Finnesse and Egyptian-British singer Natacha Atlas. Reporter Lynn Rutherford called it "a fiercely driving program that requires Tennell to skate full-throttle for most of the routine". For her free skate, which Richaud also choreographed, she used music from three versions of Romeo and Juliet, in order to make the program modern and to emphasize Tennell's strength, speed, and emotion. The first section included selections from Prokofiev's ballet and used angular, powerful movements to show Juliet's determination and willfulness; the middle section featured the score from the 1968 film and was highlighted by a fluid step sequence. The third section of the program featured the score from the 1996 movie Romeo + Juliet. Tennell's coach, Denise Myers, thought that her free skate showed a more mature side to Tennell. Richaud also stated that the 2018–2019 season was the first year he and Tennell worked "as true collaborators", and that he looked forward to continuing to work with her leading up to the 2022 Olympics.

Tennell's first competition of the season was the Autumn Classic International in Oakville, Ontario. NBC Sports reported that she "scored a big upset" over two-time world champion and Olympic silver medalist Evgenia Medvedeva of Russia; it was Tennell's first senior international title. She came in second place after the short program, just 1.72 points behind Medvedeva. She had a difficult warm-up before the free skate but was happy with her performance so early in the season. NBC Sports also reported that she was more expressive and elegant than the previous season, "with angular movements and staccato footwork". Reporter Karen Price said that she "put on a display of power, grace and her trademark clean routine" that showcased her technical prowess and tenacity. Tennell successfully completed seven solid triples, including two triple-triple combinations, although the judges ruled two jumps short of rotation. One of the combinations was a triple Lutz-triple loop, which only one other skater, Olympic champion Alina Zagitova, had done the previous season. She also completed intricate footwork and transitions, ending with "a beautiful spinning sequence". She earned a personal free skate best score of 137.15 points, and 206.41 points overall. Figure skating analyst Tara Lipinski stated that although Tennell was not yet at the same level as Medvedeva or Zagitova, her performance at the Autumn Classic demonstrated a strong start to the season, as well as a dramatic improvement in her music choices, choreography, and intention behind each movement.

Tennell was "one of the headliners" going into the 2018 Skate America. She "displayed great tempo and flow" in the short program, but she popped the second jump in her planned triple Lutz-triple loop combination into a single jump, ending up with a score of 61.72 and in fifth place. Her free skate was "underwhelming", with three minor errors, and she came in fourth place overall. U.S. champion and Olympic silver medalist Rosalynn Sumners, who watched Tennell's free skate at Skate America, later stated that she was impressed with Tennell's growth in her maturity and strength since the previous season and that her free skating program, which she called a "professional, polished program", was fun to watch.

In order to qualify for the Grand Prix Final, Tennell would have had to win her next Grand Prix assignment, 2018 Internationaux de France. Her free skate included five triple jumps, but she underrotated the second jump of her triple Lutz-triple loop combination and the first jump of her triple flip-double toe-double loop combination. She earned high scores on her Level 4 spins and footwork, coming in second place in the free skate, with 136.44 points overall, and third place overall, with 197.78 points. Tennell came in first place at 2018 CS Golden Spin in both the short program and free skate, and after earning 202.41 points, came in first place overall. She later told a reporter that she was disappointed with her artistic performance, calling it "lackluster" and expressing her intention to work on improving it before the U.S. Championships.

At Nationals in Detroit, Tennell came in first place after her "sharp, clean" short program, earning 76.60 points, the best all-time women's short program score at U.S. Nationals, over three points more than her score at Nationals in 2018. She opened her program with a "breathtaking" triple Lutz-triple toe loop combination and successfully executed a double Axel but got an edge call on her triple flip. She earned high-scoring Level 4s on all her elements and went into the free skate as the favorite to win her second U.S. Nationals in a row.

Tennell came in second place overall, behind Alysa Liu, who, at her debut on the senior level, became the youngest U.S. women's champion in history. During the free skate, Tennell stepped out of the second jump of her triple Lutz-triple loop combination and fell on an underrotated triple Lutz, missing the second jump in a planned combination. She completed Level 4 spins and footwork, all with high marks, throughout her program and earned the second-highest component score of the competition. She came in fourth place after the free skate, earning 136.99 points and 213.59 points overall. Tennell, third-pace finisher Mariah Bell, and Ting Cui, who came in fifth place, were chosen to compete at the Four Continents Championships because Liu was not age-eligible to compete internationally. Tennell and Bell were chosen to compete at the Worlds championships.

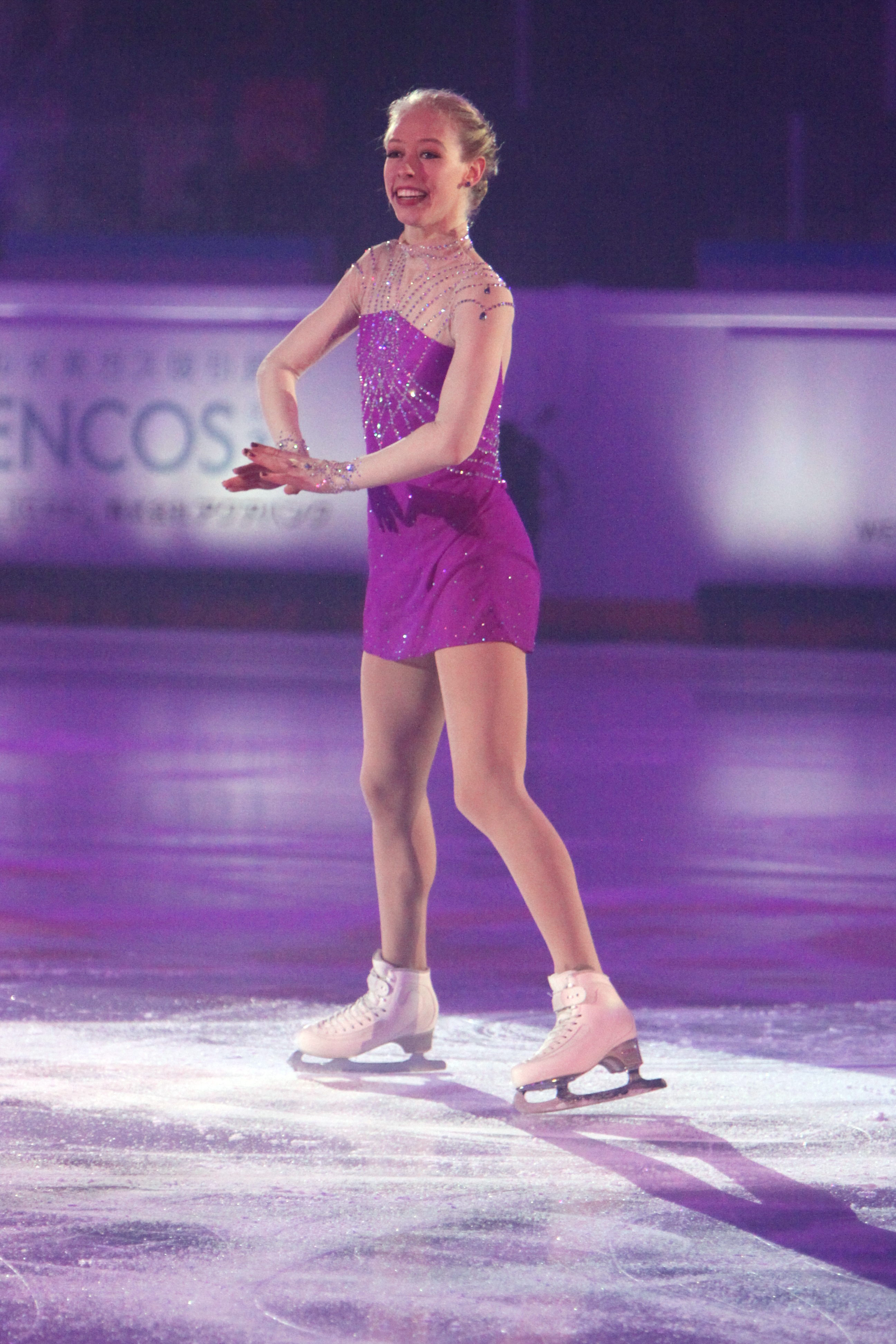
Tennell during the Exhibition at the 2018 Internationaux de France

At Four Continents, Tennell held a slight lead after the short program by half a point over Kaori Sakamoto of Japan. She skated a "strong and fluid" program, successfully completing a triple Lutz-triple toe in the opening moments of the program, a double Axel, and her final jump, a triple flip. She earned high-scoring Level 4s on all her elements, earning a season's best of 73.91 points.

Reporter Helene Elliott said that Tennell's short program "featured a new and welcome sense she was emotionally engaged, which complemented her proficiency." Elliott also reported that Sakamoto had slightly better program component scores, while Tennell had slightly better technical element scores. During her free skate, Tennell underrotated four triple jumps, was only able to complete two solid triple jumps successfully, and turned her triple loop into a single jump. She was also, like at U.S. Nationals, unable to complete her triple Lutz-triple loop combination. She earned Level 4s on all her spins and footwork but came in fifth place after the free skate and fifth place overall. She later expressed frustration that the only time she failed to complete her Lutz-loop combination was during competitions and told a reporter that she was considering removing it before Worlds.

At Worlds in Saitama, Japan, Tennell came in tenth place after a "disappointing" short program, earning 69.50 points. She successfully completed an Axel and triple flip but underrotated the last jump in her triple Lutz-triple toe combination, even though she had performed it consistently in practice. She successfully completed seven triple jumps during her free skate, including a double Axel and a triple Lutz-triple toe combination jump early in her program, earning a season's best score of 143.97 points and coming in seventh place overall, with 213.47 points.

Tennell told reporters that she was happy with her free skate, which was called "one of the best skates of her career", and that her confidence had improved since Four Continents after wavering earlier in the season. The American women were unable to secure three slots for the 2020 Worlds Championships since, with Tennell's seventh-place finish and teammate Mariah Bell's ninth-place finish, they were unable to earn the required combined placements of at least 13th place.

Tennell ended the season competing for the U.S. at the 2019 World Team Trophy, helping her team win the competition for the fourth time since it started in 2009. She came in fourth place after the short program, earning 74.81 points. As figure skating reporter Philip Hersh said, she performed the best free skating program of her career, with seven triple jumps, including a successful triple Lutz-triple toe combination and a double Axel-triple toe combination in the second half of the program. She scored 150.83 points, a new U.S. record, and came in second place, more than three points under Elizaveta Tuktamysheva from Russia, who came in first in the free skate. She and Bell, who also competed for the U.S. in the women's portion, contributed a total of 17 points towards their team's combined score of 117 points, beating Japan and Russia.

=== 2019–20 season: Four Continents bronze and Grand Prix silver ===
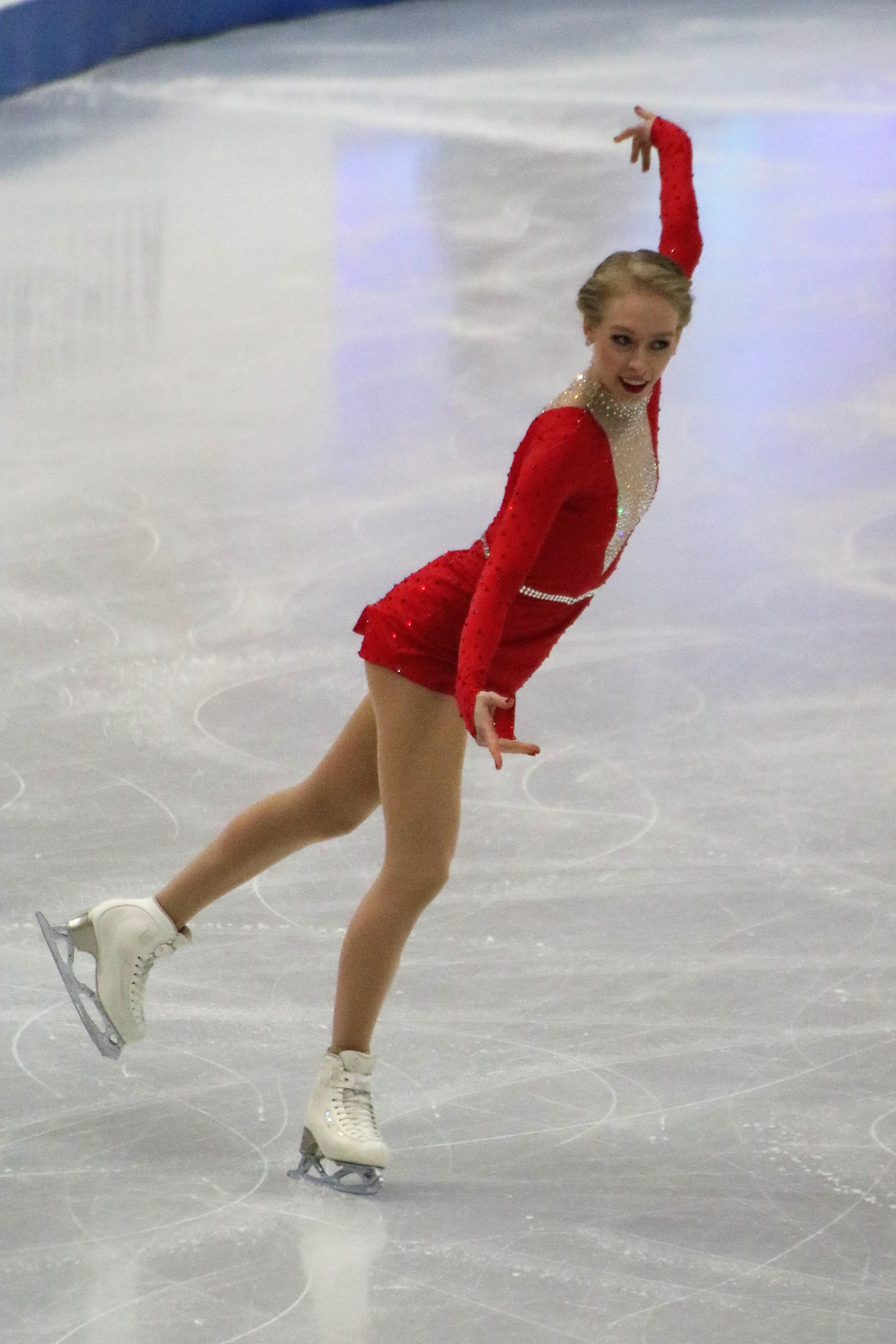
Tennell during her short program at the 2019 Grand Prix Final

Tennell worked with Alexei Mishin in Courchevel in the French Alps during the summer of 2019; she worked on her choreography, body movements, gestures, and artistry, which, according to figure skating reporter Jean-Christophe Berlot, "deeply modified her style on the ice" throughout the season, especially her two appearances during the Grand Prix and the Grand Prix Final. She also worked on including a triple Axel into her routines, which was ready at the beginning of the season, but a stress fracture in her foot in July 2019 prevented her from using it. Benoit Richaud, who choreographed her programs again for the 2019–2020 season, predicted that Tennell would be proficient in the jump by the following season and the 2022 Olympics.

Tennell's short program music included "a fast-paced medley of [Russian musician] Kirill Richter's staccato piano compositions", which demonstrated a lighter, more "fun-loving" side of her personality. It was again choreographed by Richaud and was a replacement for a short program he choreographed early in the season, which failed to inspire Tennell. Her free skating program, also choreographed by Richaud, was set to music from the 1988 film Cinema Paradiso. Her coach Denise Myers called Tennell's short program "a little sassier, a little more mature", and her free skate "soft and feminine". There was also no choreographed break before her step sequence, unlike her previous free skating program, so it was more challenging.

Tennell "had a rough start after her injury", but attended U.S. Figure Skating's Champ Camp in early August while wearing a protective boot. She had to withdraw from a Challenger Series competition early in the season due to the injury but returned to training one month before her first competition of the season, 2019 Skate America. She placed first place in her "flawless" short program, with a personal best score of 75.10 points, an almost two-point advantage over Japanese skaters Kaori Sakamoto and Wakaba Higuchi, who were in second and third place, and Anna Shcherbakova from Russia, who was in fourth place, going into the free skate. Tennell's jumps were "effortless" and included "a solid" triple Lutz-triple toe loop combination, a double Axel, and triple flip. Her spins and footwork all received Level 4s, and she received a standing ovation from the spectators. Tennell skated a clean free skate as well, scoring 141.04 points. She successfully completed six triple jumps, including opening with her most difficult element, a triple Lutz-triple toe loop combination, as well as a triple flip-double toe-double loop combination and another triple Lutz-triple toe combination during the second half of the program. The technical judging panel, however, identified the second triple Lutz-triple toe combination as a triple-double, which removed several points from her score. A misidentification of an element did not qualify for an appeal in ISU rules, so Tennell's score remained, although it had no impact on the outcome of the competition. She earned 150.83 points during the free skate and the highest program component score of the competition. Tennell came in second place overall, earning a total of 216.14 points and her first silver medal at a Grand Prix competition.

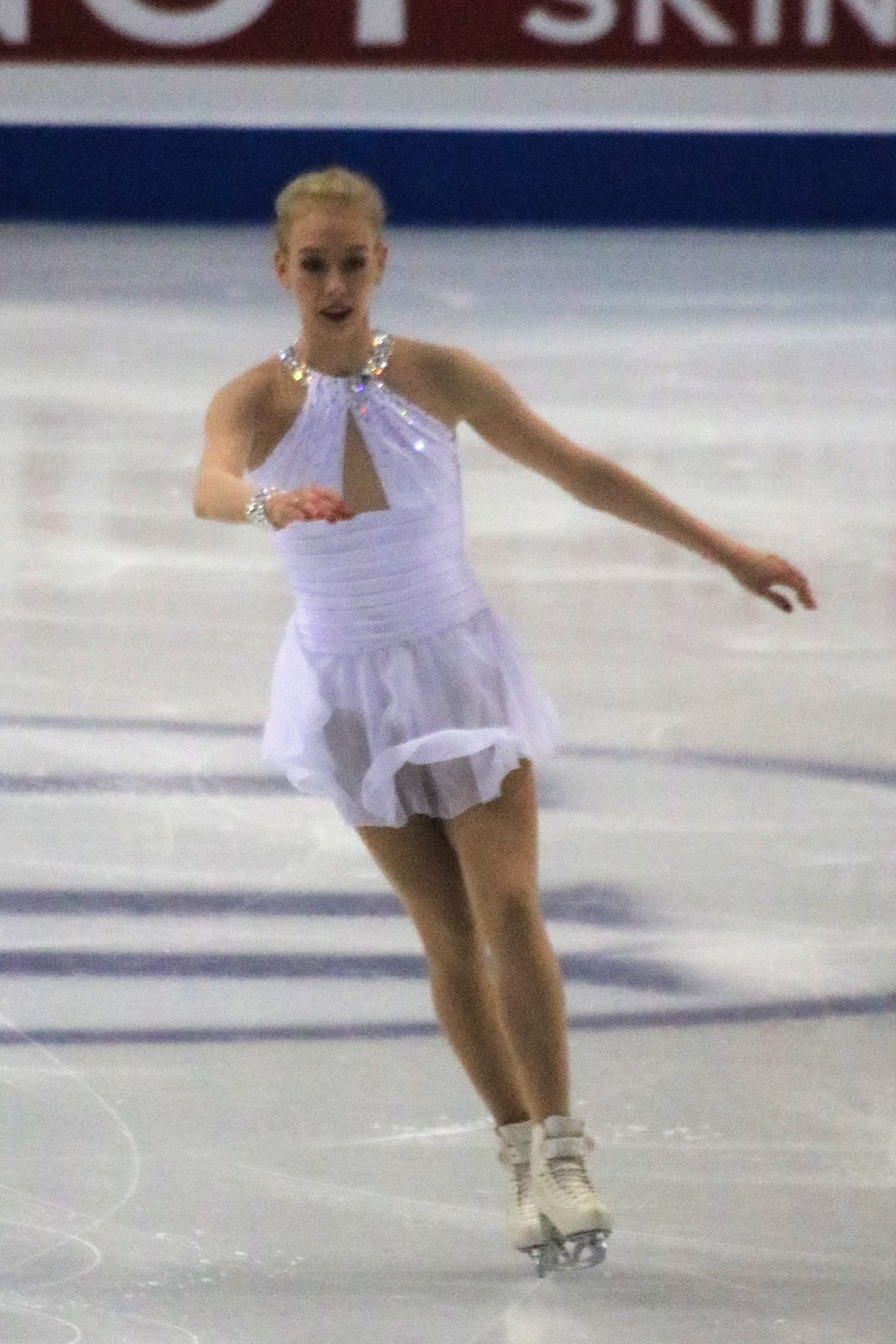
Tennell performing her free skate during the 2019 Grand Prix Final

Tennell placed fourth at Skate Canada, a week after Skate America, earning a total of 211.31 points overall. She skated two "fairly clean" programs, and was the highest-scoring competitor without a quadruple jump. She came in fourth place after the short program, earning 72.92 points overall. She also was given Level 4 marks for three elements and earned the second-highest program component score (34.46 points). During her free skate, Tennell underrotated the second jump in a triple Lutz-triple toe combination and stepped out of a triple flip, but she was able to successfully complete a triple Lutz-triple toe combination at the beginning of the program, as well as two double Axels and a triple Salchow. Her spins and footwork were given Level 4s. She came in fifth place in the free skate but earned the third-highest program component score of the competition, with 138.39 points.

Tennell was the only American woman to compete at the 2019 Grand Prix Final, the first American woman since Ashley Wagner and Gracie Gold in 2015 and the first Grand Prix Final of her career. She came in "a creditable fifth place", ahead of World champion Alina Zagitova. Her choreography and movement had improved in both her short program and free skate. Other than underrotating the final jump in her triple Lutz-triple toe combination in the short program, she skated a clean program. She also successfully completed a double Axel and triple flip, as well as earning Level 4s and positive grades of execution in her spins and footwork. She came in fourth place after the short program, with 72.20 points, three points below her personal best score. She successfully completed a triple Lutz-triple toe and triple Salchow in her "beautiful" free skate, although she underrotated the final jump in her second triple Lutz-triple toe combination later in the program. She also underrotated the triple flip portion of her three-jump combination, which included a double toe jump and double loop. She also earned positive grades of execution for her "solid" double Axels, spins, and footwork. She earned 139.98 points, less than two points below her season's best, and 212.18 points overall.

At the 2020 U.S. Nationals, Tennell required treatment for an infected hematoma in her arm, injured a few months earlier when she hit a wall during a fall. Despite not being able to bend her arm the previous morning, Tennell came in first place in the short program over defending champion Alysa Liu, and Mariah Bell. Reporter Paula Slater called Tennell's short program "a stellar performance". She opened with a "solid" triple Lutz-double Axel combination, and successfully completed a triple flip and executed strong Level 4 spins and footwork. She earned 78.96 points, over 3.5 points more than Liu and the highest-ever short program score at Nationals. In her free skate, Tennell started off strongly with two triple Lutz-triple toe combinations, but underrotated the first jump in her triple flip-double toe combination and fell on her triple loop. She earned Level 4s for all her elements and received the second-highest component scores. She finished third in the free skate, with 141.90 points, and came in third place overall, with 220.86 points. She later said that competing at Nationals was more challenging than competing at the Grand Prix Finals.

Tennell came in third place at the 2020 Four Continents Championships, the first American women to medal at Four Continents since 2017. She "showed intensity" during her short program, successfully executing a solid triple Lutz-triple toe combination, double Axel, and triple flip. She earned a Level 3 on her final combination spin and Level 4s on all her other elements, coming in second place with 75.93 points, a season's best score, and five points behind Japanese skater Rika Kihira. Reporter Paula Slater called Tennell's free skate "a confident and expressive routine", although she turned out her landing of the first jump of her triple Lutz-triple toe combination and received an edge call on the triple flip portion of her triple flip-double toe-double loop combination. She successfully completed four clean triple jumps and two double Axels and earned Level 4 spins and footwork. She earned 147.04 points, a season's-best score, and 222.97 points overall.

Tennell and Mariah Bell were chosen to represent the U.S. women at the 2020 World Championships. It would have been her third consecutive trip to Worlds, but the competition was canceled due to the COVID-19 outbreak.

=== 2020–21 season: Competing during COVID and Grand Prix medal ===
In August 2020, Tennell announced that after 13 years working with her coach, Denise Myers, she was changing coaches to Tom Zakrajsek. Tennell moved to Colorado Springs, Colorado, where Zakrajsek was based, to train with him, where she could train with other elite skaters such as 2018 Olympians Vincent Zhou and Karen Chen, 2019 World Junior champion Tomoki Hiwatashi, and 2018 U.S. Junior champion Camden Pulkinen. Tennell and Zakrajsek began working on adding a triple Axel and a few quadruple jumps to her repertoire. For Tennell's triple Axel, Zakrjsek worked with her on a different entry pattern and increasing the time she was in the air after her takeoff in order to help her completely rotate the jump consistently. Tennell and Zakrijsek were cautious, however, because although she was stronger after her back problems in 2016 and 2017, they recognized that she was older and more susceptible to injuries. She told Philip Hersh from NBC Sports that she was frustrated about not reaching her goals or progressing fast enough, as well as by her failure to add the triple Axel. She recognized, however, that the limits on traveling and competing imposed by the COVID outbreak could benefit her in her training. Tennell said the move to Colorado felt "like a fresh start". She and her choreographer, Benoit Richard, worked out the choreography for both of her programs over Zoom; her short program was set to music by Florence and the Machine and her free skating program was set to pieces by two composers. She wanted to show a more mature side to her skating. She also returned to playing the piano, which she had learned as a child and gave up to focus on skating.

Tennell started off the season by competing in the International Skating Pool, a virtual competition conducted by U.S. Figure Skating; she came in second place overall, behind Mariah Bell. She came in second place at Skate America, after Bell, who won the gold medal. Tennell had a few injuries early in the season that prevented her from practicing jumps until the week before Skate America. She also had boot problems that were resolved a few weeks before her season began. Skating "an engaging routine" and to "Moderation" by Florence and the Machine, Tennell's only error during her short program was an underrotated triple toe jump, the second jump in her triple Lutz-triple toe jump combination, but was able to execute a successful double Axel and triple flip. She later told a reporter that she appreciated being able to compete despite the establishment of COVID restrictions. Skating to "her graceful and airy routine" to "Sarajevo" by Max Richter and "Dawn of Faith" by Eternal Eclipse, Tennell came in first place in the free skate, with 137.78 points. She underrotated her first jump, a triple Lutz-triple toe jump, but successfully completed her double Axel and triple loop jump. She also stepped out of and put her hand down her triple Salchow and underrotated her second triple Lutz-triple toe combination jump, but earned a level 4 and positive GOEs for her footwork and spins. Tennell's total overall score was 211.07 points. She said later that she felt good about her free skating performance.

Tennell won the U.S. Nationals in 2021 for the second time, three years after winning her first title, making her the first woman in 101 years to go three years between winning the U.S. championship, when Theresa Weld won in 1914 and 1920. Tennell credited Zakrajsek, who was unable to watch the competition in person because he had tested positive for COVID, with helping her regain her consistency. Tennell broke the record U.S. Nationals women's short program score, a record she had set in 2020. She successfully executed a double Axel, a triple Lutz-triple toe combination jump, and a triple flip, with positive GOEs for all jumps. She also earned level 4s on all three of her spins and footwork, earning 79.40 points. She later said that she was happy with and proud of her short program performance. Tennell earned 153.21 points in the free skate, with 232.61 points overall, more than 17 points over the second-place winner, Amber Glenn, and the biggest margin in the women's event since 2014. During her "nearly flawless" free skate, Tennell successfully accomplished all seven triple jumps and two double Axels. Her only error was a short slip at the end of her program, but as Zakrajsek stated, she "left it all out there". Tennell said that it was "exactly the performance I wanted to give, and I enjoyed every second of it".

Tennell and Karen Chen, who came in third place at U.S. Nationals, were chosen to represent the U.S. women at the 2021 World Championships. During her short program, she received an edge call on her triple Lutz-double toe combination jump, which was a planned triple-triple combination jump; the double toe part of the combination was slightly underrotated, but she successfully executed her double Axel and triple flip jump. She earned 69.87 points and came in seventh place going into the free skate. Tennell later said that she was disappointed in her performance and that her timing was off during her triple Lutz combination jump, even though she considered it one of her strongest jumps and had successfully executed it in every practice since U.S. Nationals. She placed eighth in the free skate, ending up in ninth place overall. Her placement, along with Chen's fourth, secured two berths for the United States at the 2022 Winter Olympics, with the possibility of a third, and earned three places at the following year's World Championships.

Tennell was also named to the American team for the 2021 World Team Trophy. During her short program, she underrotated the final jump of her triple Lutz-triple toe combination jump and slightly underrotated her triple flip. Her footwork was a Level 2, but she earned Level 4s and positive GOEs on all her spins, earning 67.40 points for Team USA. During her free skate, despite underrotating a few jumps, she "delivered a solid performance", earning 133.19 points. Team USA came in second place with 110 points, behind the Russians, who earned 125 points; Japan came in third place, with 107 points.

=== 2021–22 season: Foot injury ===
Tennell withdrew from what was scheduled to be her first Grand Prix assignment of the season, the 2021 Skate America, due to a foot injury. She also withdrew from the 2021 Gran Premio d'Italia (the replacement event for the 2021 Cup of China), also due to injury. In December 2021, Tennell announced on social media that she was withdrawing from the 2022 U.S. Championships, due to the same foot injury that had plagued her all season, making her ineligible to compete in the Olympics unless she filed a petition for a place on the U.S. team. She reported that she had consulted doctors from all over the U.S., changed boots, and tried many treatments, none of which were effective. Her withdrawal made her the first American woman not to defend her national title since Sasha Cohen in 2007 and the first not to do so during an Olympic year since Michelle Kwan in 2006. Kwan was the last American figure skater to successfully petition for a place on an Olympic team after not competing at a national championship. Tennell called it "the hardest decision of my life", wished her fellow skaters good luck at Nationals and in Beijing, and vowed that she would return to competition.

=== 2022–23 season: More ups and downs ===
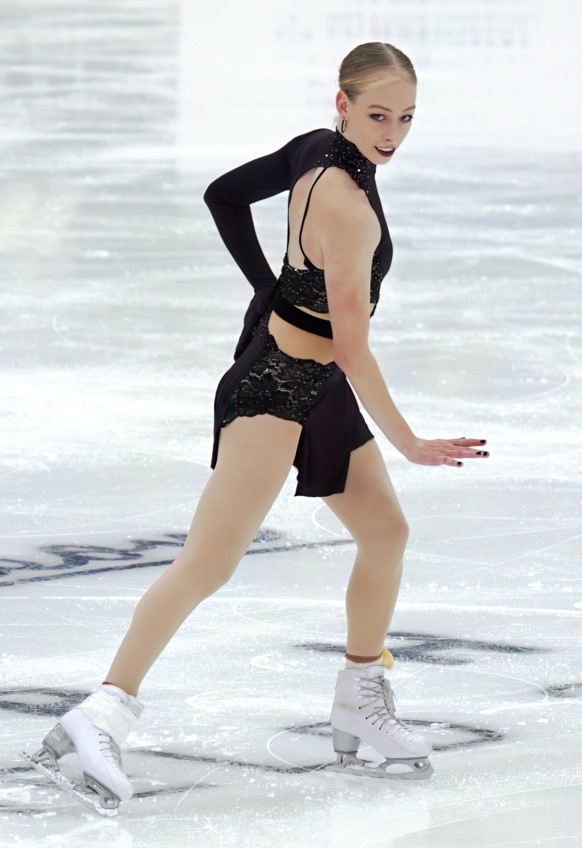
Tennell during her short program at the 2022 MK John Wilson Trophy

After waiting several months to allow her foot to heal, Tennell traveled to France in July to work with her longtime choreographer, Benoit Richaud, in La Garde. Her time there prompted her to switch to training with Richaud and technical coach Cedric Tour in Nice full-time. Describing her rationale for the move, she said, "it was really just being able to experience something new in the sport as far as training methods and technique. For me, it wasn't necessarily about learning something new but more about looking at things in a different way. That really intrigued me, at this stage in my career". She started to learn French and trained with Adam Siao Him Fa. She and Richaud created a short program that Tennell thought showed a different side to her skating and hoped would "bring more awareness to a social issue that I feel is very important in today's society".

Tennell had initially planned to begin her season at the Japan Open, but an ankle injury, which occurred the day before she was to leave for Japan, prompted her to withdraw from the competition, as well as from the International Cup of Nice. She was able to participate in the 2022 MK John Wilson Trophy in Sheffield, a replacement event for the Cup of China, which was cancelled due to travel and quarantine restrictions caused by COVID and would provide her with a bye into the 2023 U.S. Championships. She later said that she was "tempering her expectations" due to her difficulties and limited training. In Sheffield, Tennell fell twice in her short program, finishing tenth of twelve skaters, eventually coming in twelfth place overall.

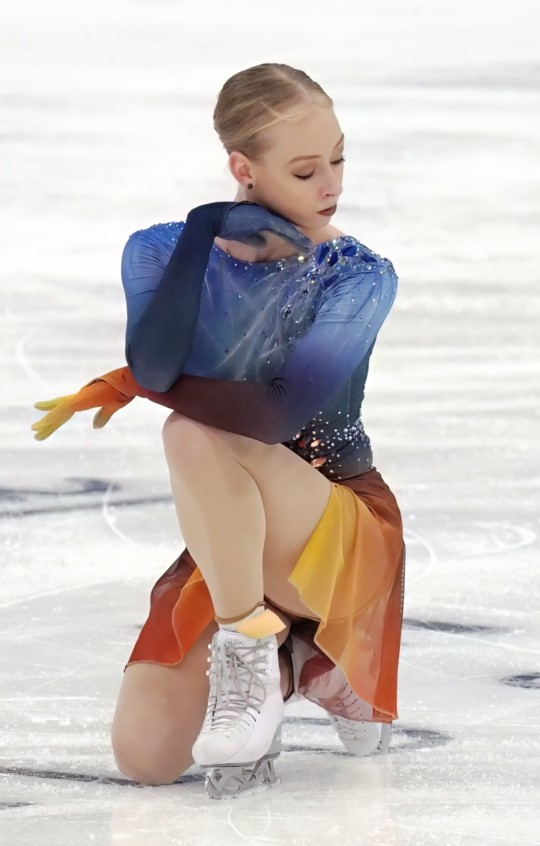
Tennell during her free skate at the 2022 MK John Wilson Trophy

At the 2022 Grand Prix of Espoo, she struggled with the landings of her jumps during her free skate, but earned level 4s for two spins and her step sequence; she came in eighth place overall, earning 163.98 points. Tennell came in second place at the 2022 CS Golden Spin of Zagreb, her first time on the podium this season, behind her teammate, Lindsay Thorngren. She came in first place in the short program, with 68.84 points, successfully executing her opening triple Lutz-triple toe combination jump and a double Axel; she also earned level 4s on all of her spins. During her free skate, she successfully executed "a high-scoring" triple Lutz-double toe loop combination jump at the beginning of her program, as well as a triple loop, a triple Salchow, and a triple loop-Euler-double Salchow combination jump towards the end. She earned 124.47 points in the free skate and earned 193.31 points overall.

At the 2023 U.S. Championships in San Jose, California, Tennell placed narrowly second in the short program, only 0.02 points, with 73.76 points, behind favorite Isabeau Levito, after making what she called "a silly" spin error. Golden Skate reported that Tennell "did not hand the short program win to Levito easily" and that she skated her "modern short program...with panache". Speaking afterwards, Tennell said that "this was a very long time in the making. I definitely had my fair share of bumps in the road on the way here but overall, I am really happy with my performance". Tennell also said that she felt nostalgic skating in San Jose again, since it was where she won her first Nationals in 2018. Skating to "Restrictus" by Mario Batkovic, she "masterfully blended complicated and brooding choreography with strong technical elements". She opened her program with a triple Lutz-triple toe loop combination jump and earned level 4s on her layback spin and step sequence, although she lost points on her flying spin, which was judged as a Level 1, and on her closing combination spin, which gave Levito a slight edge going into the free skate. Tennell explained that her final spin errors occurred "because I got a little excited", adding that "we're going to take that in stride and move forward for the long program". Skating to The Four Seasons by Vivaldi, she came in second place in the free skate as well. She opened her program with her reliable and confident triple Lutz-triple toe loop combination jump and successfully executed three more triple jumps, although she underrotated and stepped out of the last jump in her double Axel-triple toe loop combination jump and doubled her planned second triple Lutz. She also earned positive GOEs for her spins and footwork sequence, which were all Level 4s, earning 139.36 points in her free skate and 213.12 points overall, ten points behind Isabeau Levito. Continuing what Golden Skate called "her comeback" and her "return to domestic glory", Tennell won the silver medal, behind Levito, who came in first place, and ahead of Amber Glenn, who won the bronze medal. Tennell later said that winning the silver medal at San Jose was sentimental for her and that despite her errors, she was proud of her performance. She, Levito, and Glenn were all chosen to compete at the 2023 Four Continents Championships.

At Four Continents in Colorado Springs, Tennell finished fifth in the short program, skating to "Michigan 7" and earning a personal best score of 69.49 points. She slightly underrotated the final jump of her triple Lutz-triple toe jump combination, but the rest of the program was clean, with many positive GOEs and level 4 spins and footwork. She later said that she felt a little stiff, but that she was excited to experience Four Continents in her home country and that she felt that she had improved. Tennell made minor but costly errors in her free skate, lightly underrotating her opening jump of her triple Lutz-triple toe combination jump and her triple loop. She also underrotated the closing jump of her double Axel-triple toe-double toe combination jump, as well as her first jump in her triple Lutz-double toe combination jump. All three of her spins and footwork earned her positive GOEs. She came in sixth place in the free skate, with 130.42 points, and dropped to sixth place overall, with 199.91 points. Tennell later revealed that she had been sick during the preceding week and felt "like a frog" while skating, but that she felt proud that she was able to maintain control anyway.

Tennell came 15th place at the 2023 World Championships, earning 117.69 points for her free skate program and earned an overall score of 184.14 points. Tennell attributed her difficulties to "a lot of nerves today with it being my first Worlds back", but said that she was pleased with "the fight that I displayed".

=== 2023–24 season: Withdrawal ===
Tennell started off the 2023-2024 season by winning lower-level competitions in Hungary and China and was scheduled to compete in the Grand Prix, but withdrew for the rest of the season after breaking an ankle in training, her second ankle injury in three years. She said on social media that "I had a little mishap while warming up my step sequence during training" and "caught an edge on a bracket and managed to break my ankle in a funky fall". She had a spiral oblique fracture, which required doctors to insert a large four-inch plate, with five screws, in the area of her ankle. She then had to have a second surgery to remove the plate because it limited her range of motion and caused tendon irritation. She said that she was determined to come back stronger the following season. She said that the injury was "devastating" after coming back the previous season and doing well in her first two Grand Prix events, but credited her physical therapist with her recovery. She also stated that it was too painful to watch U.S. Nationals that year and that she was not sure if she would be able to perform jumps again.

=== 2024–25 season: Comeback and Four Continents silver ===
Going into the 2024–2025 season, after five months off the ice, Tennell reported that she felt "100% healthy" and continued full-time training with Benoit Richaud via FaceTime, phone calls, and "strategically planned visits" while living on her own in West Orange, New Jersey.

Tennell made her return to competition at the 2024 Shanghai Trophy, where she won the silver medal. Going on to compete on the 2024–25 Grand Prix series, Tennell competed at her fifth Skate America. She placed second in the short program, earning 66.99 points, less than 1.5 points behind Isabeau Levito, but sixth in the free skate, dropping to fifth place overall. In her short program, she skated to music from Lord of the Dance, finishing it with a fist pump, and by yelling out "Yeah!" and placing her hands on her head. She later told reporters, "It was worth every day of doubt, every small setback, every moment of can I ever get back to this level again, just to come out and skate like that". Skating to music from the Puccini opera Turandot, Tennell came in sixth place in the free skate, earning 123.05 points and 192.04 points overall. She successfully executed five clean triple jumps, but underrotated as she came out of a double Axel-triple toe loop combination jump and popped a Lutz jump. She earned fewer points in her step sequence and one of her spins was downgraded to a level two. She later said that she was disappointed in her performance because she had skated clean programs during practice and that it was not how she wanted to end the competition. Tennell stated that the wrong cut of her music played during her free skate, which distracted her and resulted in being "off the music throughout".

Tennell came in fifth place in the short program at NHK Trophy. She struggled on her opening jumping pass, but skated cleanly the rest of the program with strong components, including a double Axel jump and a triple loop jump. Skating to "Nessun Dorma" from the Puccini opera Turandot and performed by Luciano Pavaroti and Sarah Brightman, she came in third place in the free skating program, with a strong triple Lutz jump, followed by a triple loop jump-double Axel jump sequence. She finished in fifth place overall, with 190.25 points. She subsequently won the bronze medal at the 2024 CS Golden Spin of Zagreb.

In January, Tennell competed at the 2025 U.S. Championships in Wichita, Kansas. She placed second in the short program behind Alysa Liu, earning 71.23 points. and earned 128.71 points in her free skate, dropping to fourth place overall, with a total score of 199.94 points. After the short program, she said, "The journey coming back this season was long. Today is January 23 and I had my second ankle surgery on January 26 of last year. So, it hasn't even been a full year yet since my second surgery, and I'm back at nationals and did a clean short." She later stated that she was pleased with her performance in her short program, adding that the "program is so lively and so energetic and so much fun for me to perform, and there's nothing like performing for your home country. Nationals always feels like coming home. And I'm very happy". Troy Schmidt of U.S. Figure Skating called Tennell's free skate "mature" and "sophisticated", adding that the program ended in a "superb Ina Bauer falling into a split jump". She also fought to successfully execute a few jumps, although her only major error was a fall on a triple Lutz jump.

Following the withdrawal of Amber Glenn, Tennell was assigned to compete at the 2025 Four Continents Championships in Seoul, South Korea the following month. At the event, Tennell placed fifth in the short program with 66.58 points and came in second place in the free skate, moving up to the silver medal position overall. Her teammate, Sarah Everhardt, came in third place overall; it was the first time two American women were on the podium at Four Continents since 2012. Skating again to "Nessun Dorma," Tennell earned 137.80 points in the free skate and 204.38 points overall, which was her season's best score. Although her first jump combination, a triple Lutz-triple toe loop combination jump, received a negative GOE, it was worth 9.85 points. Her triple loop-double Axel jump combination was strong and she skated cleanly the rest of her program, including five more triple jumps and her "biggest highlight", a triple Lutz-double toe loop-double loop combination jump in the second half of her free skate, which earned her 10.30 points and was her highest-scoring element. She later said that she was happy with her performance, adding, "With all the struggles of the last few years, it was a very satisfying moment to finish a program and feel such joy after skating. There's been a lot of frustration and tears this season and the past few seasons".

Tennell closed the season by winning gold at the 2025 Maria Olszewska Memorial.

=== 2025–26 season ===
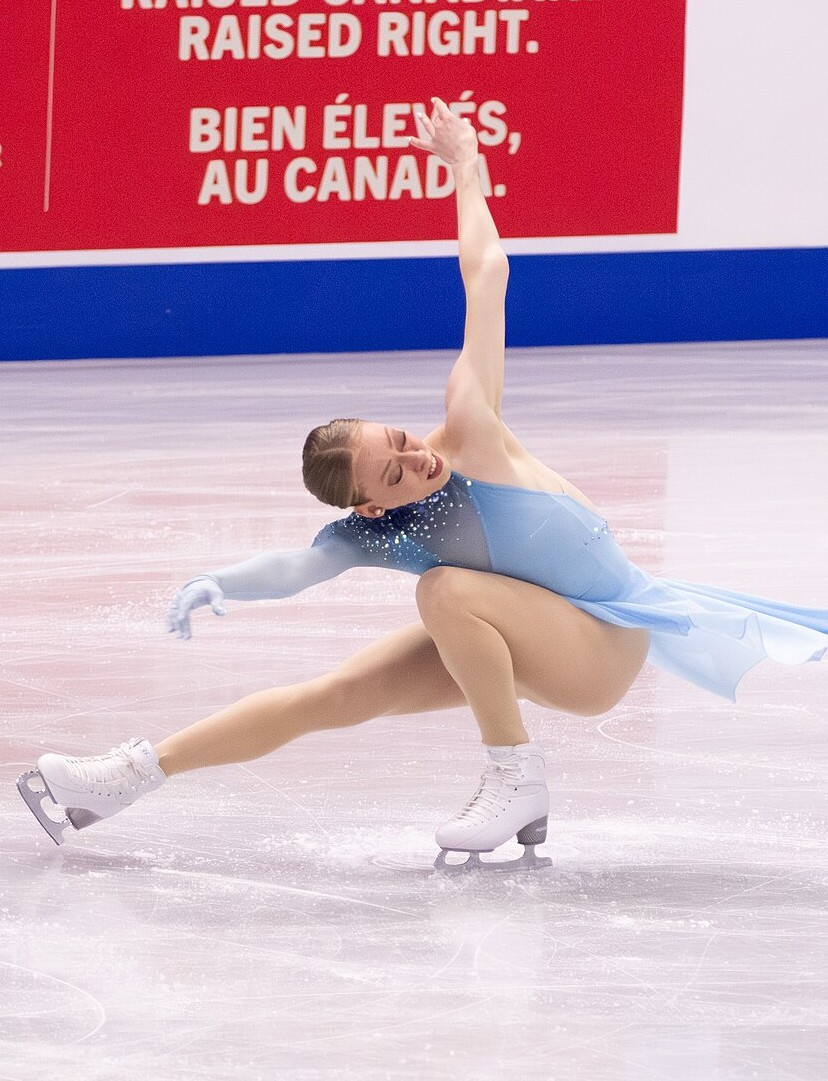
Tennell performing a broken leg sit spin during her short program at 2025 Skate Canada International

Going into the Olympic season, Tennell and choreographer, Benoît Richaud, selected music from The Mission for her free program, music that she had previously used as a junior skater during the 2016–17 season. Explaining this decision, Tennell shared, "I felt like I could draw parallels from that story (in the movie) and kind of fit it to my journey the past four years. When I missed the [Olympic] team in 2022, you know, it was a death, it was the death of that dream. It took me a really, really long time to kind of make my peace with it. I'm not telling the story of the movie. I'm telling the story of my mission and my journey. I've been on a mission the past four years to achieve that end goal of making it back on the Olympic team."

She opened her season at 2025 CS Kinoshita Group Cup where she placed fifth. Following the event, Tennell and Richaud decided to scrap her intended "No Time to Die" short program and to instead use what was intended to be her exhibition program to the song "Young and Beautiful", as a competitive program.

The following month, she competed at 2025 Skate Canada International. She placed fifth in the short program and revealed that she had a "gushing" nose bleed while changing into her dress. "I got it all over my dress. I was panicking," said Tennell. "The doctor gave me something to put in my nose for the warmup to stop the bleeding, but I got on and I was shaking. So the first jump was just a little bit off, which is unfortunate because it's been going very, very well in practice."

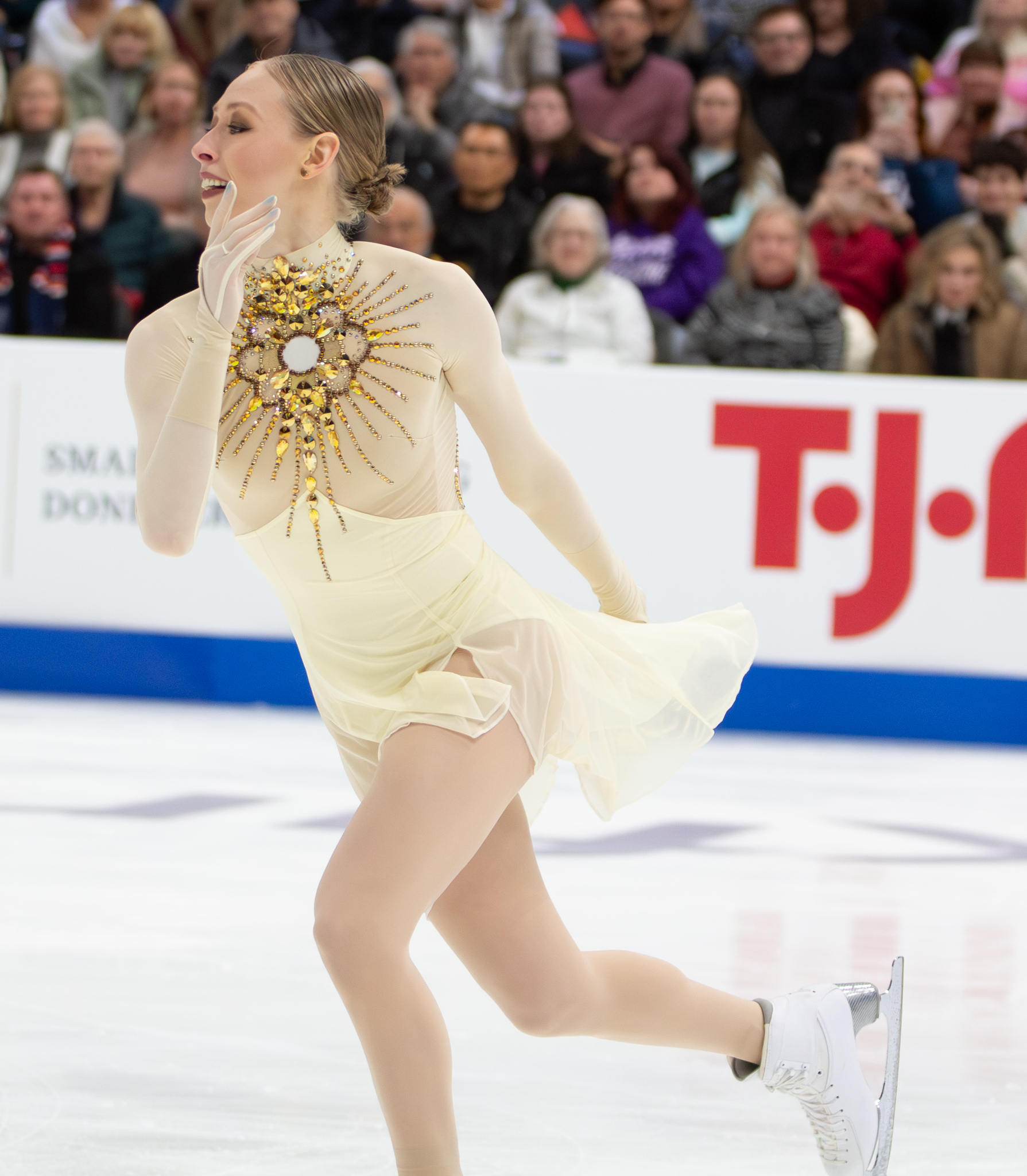
Tennell during her free skate at 2026 U.S. Championships

Tennell went on to place fourth in the free skate and overall. "There were some good things, obviously some things to improve on, but it is just my first Grand Prix of the season," she said. "So, lots of room to grow and I'm excited to get home and continue."

Three weeks later, Tennell competed at 2025 Finlandia Trophy where she finished fourth. "I really just had a better feeling today, like a more fighting spirit, and it just reminded me of why I came back to this sport," she said after the free skate. "Like why I love it so much and why it's so important to me."

In December, she took the gold medal at the 2025 CS Golden Spin of Zagreb.

The following month, Tennell won the pewter medal at the 2026 U.S. Championships and was subsequently named to the 2026 Four Continents team. "I would be lying if I said I hadn't thought about, you know, after this season," the 27-year-old said of her future. "But, I felt it would be doing myself a disservice to try and decide that while I was still in the thick of it. So, we've tabled that for now, and we're staying in the moment."

Less than two weeks later, Tennell placed fourth at the 2026 Four Continents Championships. "I feel better than before," she said after the free skate. "I was a bit disappointed yesterday after the short program, and I was upset with the score. But I really tried very hard today. I tried to channel the energy that I didn't have four years ago, when I was injured, that feeling of wanting it so badly. And I used that for the performance today. I think it worked, so I'm happy."

In early March, Alysa Liu withdrew from the 2026 World Championships. Although Tennell was the first alternate, she declined the spot and it was passed onto Sarah Everhardt. Following this, many rumours circulated that Bradie would retire from competitive skating. In response to the rumours, she shared on her Instagram story; "I just wanted to address a couple things I see circulating since the Worlds announcement. The decision to give up my spot was my own, and it wasn't one I made lightly. There was much thought and many reasons - I wasn't passed over, and I'm thankfully not injured. Please don't mistake this for a retirement announcement because that's not what this means. They are two entirely different decisions...I'm doing well, and very excited to cheer on the team from afar".

== Skating technique ==
Tennell was known for her consistency, jumping proficiency, resiliency, and mental toughness. Figure skater and commentator Tara Lipinski called Tennell "a machine". Reporter Gary D'Amato stated that Tennell's strengths were her athleticism and her consistency in completing difficult jumps. Chelsea Janes of the Washington Post agreed, stating that "Tennell's gift is her jumping ability". Janes compared Tennell with fellow American skater Mirai Nagasu, stating that although she did not have Nagasu's "explosive aerial capabilities", Tennell was one of the most consistent American skaters in her jumps. She rarely fell in competition, which helped her earn high technical element scores; she credited it to the technique her first coach, Denise Myers, taught her. Myers stated that Tennell had perseverance and had patience with herself. Tennell also credited her mother's "all-encompassing support" for her success.

Tennell told reporters, "I've never been a nervous competitor". She also said that she enjoyed the challenge of jumps and performing and using the energy of her audience during competition, although Helene Elliott of the Los Angeles Times, who called Tennell's jumps and spins "flawless", stated that Tennell's "consistency and technical expertise have been her greatest assets ... [but] she lacked the expressiveness that elevates great skaters above good ones".

== Programs ==
Season	Short program	Free skating	Exhibition
2011–12	Anastasia by David Newman & Stephen Flaherty	Le Corsaire by Adolphe Adam; Paquita by Ludwig Minkus	
2012–14	Sozo by Kitarō	Act 2, Pas de deux-Intrada (from The Nutcracker) by Pyotr Ilyich Tchaikovsky	
2014–15	Infinity by Balázs Havasi	Far and Away; The Chieftains by John Williams; Durango Suite; We're Getting Married by Mark McKenzie	Christmas Through Your Eyes by Gloria Estefan
2015–16	The Storm by Balázs Havasi choreo. by Scott Brown	Tango in Ebony performed by Maksim Mrvica choreo. by Cindy Stuart	Defying Gravity (from Wicked) by Stephen Schwartz performed by Kristin Chenoweth & Idina Menzel
2016–17	Remember Me by Thomas Bergersen choreo. by Scott Brown, Shanetta Folle	The Mission by Ennio Morricone choreo. by Scott Brown, Shanetta Folle	
2017–18	Taegukgi by Lee Dong-jun choreo. by Scott Brown	Cinderella by Patrick Doyle choreo. by Benoît Richaud	Cinderella by Patrick Doyle choreo. by Benoît Richaud; This Is Me by Keala Settle & The Greatest Showman Ensemble; Unstoppable by Sia; Roots by Grace Davies
2018–19	Rebirth by Hi-Finesse feat. Natacha Atlas choreo. by Benoît Richaud	Romeo and Juliet; Montagues and Capulets by Sergei Prokofiev; Love Theme by Nino Rota, Henry Mancini; O Verona by Nellee Hooper, Craig Armstrong, Marius de Vries choreo. by Benoît Richaud	Stay; Diamonds by Rihanna
2019–20	Mechanisms; Chronos by Kirill Richter choreo. by Benoît Richaud	Cinema Paradiso by Ennio Morricone choreo. by Benoît Richaud	You Need to Calm Down by Taylor Swift
2020–21	Moderation by Florence and the Machine choreo. by Benoît Richaud	Sarajevo by Max Richter; Dawn of Faith by Eternal Eclipse choreo. by Benoît Richaud	Up! by Shania Twain
2021–22	Restrictus by Mario Batkovic arranged by Cédric Tour choreo. by Benoît Richaud	Nuvole bianche by Ludovico Einaudi arranged by Cédric Tour choreo. by Benoît Richaud	
2022–23	Michigan 7 by Kirill Richter choreo. by Benoît Richaud; Restrictus by Mario Batkovic arranged by Cédric Tour choreo. by Benoît Richaud	The Four Seasons by Antonio Vivaldi arranged by Cédric Tour choreo. by Benoît Richaud	Mechanisms by Kirill Richter
2023–24	Kammermusik by Arash Safaian, Sebastian Knauer and Eldbjørg Hemsing choreo. by Benoît Richaud	Turandot; Violin Fantasy on Puccini's Turandot by Vanessa-Mae; Nessun dorma by Giacomo Puccini performed by Jackie Evancho choreo. by Benoît Richaud	Mechanisms by Kirill Richter
2024–25	Lord of the Dance; Cry of the Celts; Lord of the Dance by Ronan Hardiman choreo. by Benoît Richaud	Turandot; Violin Fantasy on Puccini's Turandot by Vanessa-Mae; Nessun dorma by Giacomo Puccini performed by Jackie Evancho choreo. by Benoît Richaud	Breakfast at Tiffany's; Breakfast at Tiffany's by Henry Mancini; Moon River performed by Audrey Hepburn; Something for Cat by Henry Mancini
2025–26	No Time to Die by Billie Eilish arranged by Cédric Tour choreo. by Benoît Richaud; Young and Beautiful (from The Great Gatsby) by Lana Del Rey choreo. by Benoît Richaud	The Mission; Carlotta by Ennio Morricone; Gabriel's Oboe (Whispers in a Dream) performed by Hayley Westenra; Miserere; Falls; Asunción; On Earth as It Is in Heaven by Ennio Morricone arranged by Cédric Tour choreo. by Benoît Richaud	Young and Beautiful (from The Great Gatsby) by Lana Del Rey choreo. by Benoît Richaud; Mechanisms; Chronos by Kirill Richter

== Competitive highlights ==
- GP – Event of the ISU Grand Prix Series
- JGP – Event of the ISU Junior Grand Prix Series
- CS – Event of the ISU Challenger Series
- C – Event was cancelled
- TBD – Assigned
- WD – Withdrew from competition
- Medals at team events are awarded for the team results only. Individual placements at team events are listed in parentheses.

Competition placements at senior level
Season	2015–16	2016–17	2017–18	2018–19	2019–20	2020–21	2022–23	2023–24	2024–25	2025–26
Winter Olympics			9th							
Winter Olympics (Team event)			3rd							
World Championships			6th	7th	C	9th	15th			
Four Continents Championships				5th	3rd		6th		2nd	4th
Grand Prix Final					5th					
U.S. Championships	6th	9th	1st	2nd	3rd	1st	2nd		4th	4th
World Team Trophy				1st (2nd)		2nd (5th)				
GP Finland							8th			4th
GP France				3rd						
GP NHK Trophy									5th	
GP Skate America			3rd	4th	2nd	2nd			5th	
GP Skate Canada					4th					4th
GP Wilson Trophy							12th			
CS Autumn Classic				1st						
CS Budapest Trophy								1st		
CS Golden Spin of Zagreb				1st			2nd		3rd	1st
CS Kinoshita Group Cup										5th
CS Lombardia Trophy			4th							
CS Tallinn Trophy		3rd								
CS Warsaw Cup					2nd					
Japan Open				3rd (4th)	3rd (5th)					
Maria Olszewska Memorial									1st	
Philadelphia Summer			1st							
Shanghai Trophy								1st	2nd	

Competition placements at junior level
Season	2013–14	2014–15	2015–16	2016–17
World Junior Championships			11th	7th
U.S. Championships	4th	1st		
JGP Austria			11th	
JGP Japan		8th		
Gardena Spring Trophy	3rd			

== Detailed results ==
ISU personal best scores in the +5/-5 GOE System
Segment	Type	Score	Event
Total	TSS	225.64	2019 World Team Trophy
Short program	TSS	75.93	2020 Four Continents Championships
Short program	TES	41.33	2019 Skate America
Short program	PCS	35.00	2020 Four Continents Championships
Free skating	TSS	150.83	2019 World Team Trophy
Free skating	TES	79.64	2019 World Team Trophy
Free skating	PCS	71.19	2019 World Team Trophy

ISU personal best scores in the +3/-3 GOE System
Segment	Type	Score	Event
Total	TSS	204.10	2017 Skate America
Short program	TSS	68.94	2018 Winter Olympics (Team event)
Short program	TES	38.94	2018 Winter Olympics (Team event)
Short program	PCS	31.23	2018 World Championships
Free skating	TSS	137.09	2017 Skate America
Free skating	TES	72.68	2017 Skate America
Free skating	PCS	65.30	2018 World Championships

- Small medals for the short program and free skating are only awarded at ISU Championships.
- At national events in the United States, pewter medals are awarded for fourth place.
- Medals at team events are awarded for the team results only. Individual placements at team events are listed in parentheses.

=== Senior level ===
Results in the 2015–16 season
Date	Event	SP		FS		Total	
Date	Event	P	Score	P	Score	P	Score
Jan 15–24, 2016	(United States) 2016 U.S. Championships	7	58.26	6	123.07	6	181.33

Results in the 2016–17 season
Date	Event	SP		FS		Total	
Date	Event	P	Score	P	Score	P	Score
Nov 20–27, 2016	(Estonia) 2016 CS Tallinn Trophy	8	54.44	3	114.54	3	168.98
Jan 14–22, 2017	(United States) 2017 U.S. Championships	9	59.77	11	110.21	9	169.98

Results in the 2017–18 season
Date	Event	SP		FS		Total	
Date	Event	P	Score	P	Score	P	Score
Aug 3–6, 2017	(United States) 2017 Philadelphia Summer International	2	64.92	2	120.06	1	184.98
Sep 14–17, 2017	(Italy) 2017 CS Lombardia Trophy	5	64.34	3	132.36	4	196.70
Nov 24–26, 2017	(United States) 2017 Skate America	4	67.01	3	137.09	3	204.10
Jan 1–9, 2018	(United States) 2018 U.S. Championships	1	73.79	1	145.72	1	219.51
Feb 9–12, 2018	(South Korea) 2018 Winter Olympics (Team event)	5	68.94	—N/a	—N/a	3	—N/a
Feb 21–23, 2018	(South Korea) 2018 Winter Olympics	11	64.01	9	128.34	9	192.35
Mar 21–23, 2018	(Italy) 2018 World Championships	7	68.76	4	131.13	6	199.89

Results in the 2018–19 season
Date	Event	SP		FS		Total	
Date	Event	P	Score	P	Score	P	Score
Sep 20–22, 2018	(Canada) 2018 CS Autumn Classic International	2	69.26	1	137.15	1	206.41
Oct 6, 2018	2018 Japan Open	—N/a	—N/a	4	126.86	3	—N/a
Oct 19–21, 2018	(United States) 2018 Skate America	5	61.72	4	131.17	4	192.89
Nov 23–25, 2018	2018 Internationaux de France	6	61.34	2	136.44	3	197.78
Dec 5–8, 2018	(Croatia) 2018 CS Golden Spin of Zagreb	1	71.50	1	130.91	1	202.41
Jan 18–27, 2019	(United States) 2019 U.S. Championships	1	76.60	4	136.99	2	213.59
Feb 7–10, 2019	(United States) 2019 Four Continents Championships	1	73.91	5	128.16	5	202.07
Mar 18–24, 2019	(Japan) 2019 World Championships	10	69.50	7	143.97	7	213.47
Apr 11–14, 2019	(Japan) 2019 World Team Trophy	4	74.81	2	150.83	1 (2)	225.64

Results in the 2019–20 season
Date	Event	SP		FS		Total	
Date	Event	P	Score	P	Score	P	Score
Oct 5, 2019	2019 Japan Open	—N/a	—N/a	5	124.91	3	—N/a
Oct 18–20, 2019	(United States) 2019 Skate America	1	75.10	2	141.04	2	216.14
Oct 25–27, 2019	2019 Skate Canada International	4	72.92	5	138.39	4	211.31
Nov 14–17, 2019	(Poland) 2019 CS Warsaw Cup	1	70.10	5	118.91	2	189.01
Dec 5–8, 2019	(Italy) 2019–20 Grand Prix Final	4	72.20	5	139.98	5	212.18
Jan 20–26, 2020	(United States) 2020 U.S. Championships	1	78.96	3	141.90	3	220.86
Feb 4–9, 2020	(South Korea) 2020 Four Continents Championships	2	75.93	3	147.04	3	222.97

Results in the 2020–21 season
Date	Event	SP		FS		Total	
Date	Event	P	Score	P	Score	P	Score
Oct 23–24, 2020	(United States) 2020 Skate America	2	73.29	1	137.78	2	211.07
Jan 11–21, 2021	(United States) 2021 U.S. Championships	1	79.40	1	153.21	1	232.61
Mar 22–28, 2021	(Sweden) 2021 World Championships	7	69.87	8	127.94	9	197.81
Apr 15–18, 2021	(Japan) 2021 World Team Trophy	5	67.40	4	133.19	2 (5)	200.59

Results in the 2022–23 season
Date	Event	SP		FS		Total	
Date	Event	P	Score	P	Score	P	Score
Nov 11–13, 2022	(United Kingdom) 2022 MK John Wilson Trophy	10	56.50	12	96.69	12	153.19
Nov 25–27, 2022	(Finland) 2022 Grand Prix of Espoo	7	60.64	9	103.34	8	163.98
Dec 7–10, 2022	(Croatia) 2022 CS Golden Spin of Zagreb	1	68.84	4	124.47	2	193.31
Jan 26–28, 2023	(United States) 2023 U.S. Championships	2	73.76	2	139.36	2	213.12
Feb 7–12, 2023	(United States) 2023 Four Continents Championships	5	69.49	6	130.42	6	199.91
Mar 20–26, 2023	(Japan) 2023 World Championships	8	66.45	16	117.69	15	184.14

Results in the 2023–24 season
Date	Event	SP		FS		Total	
Date	Event	P	Score	P	Score	P	Score
Oct 3–5, 2023	(China) 2023 Shanghai Trophy	2	67.38	1	132.42	1	199.80
Oct 13–15, 2023	(Hungary) 2023 CS Budapest Trophy	1	65.09	1	120.75	1	185.84

Results in the 2024–25 season
Date	Event	SP		FS		Total	
Date	Event	P	Score	P	Score	P	Score
Oct 3–5, 2024	(China) 2024 Shanghai Trophy	2	66.62	2	129.99	2	196.61
Oct 18–20, 2024	(United States) 2024 Skate America	2	66.99	6	125.05	5	192.04
Nov 8–10, 2024	(Japan) 2024 NHK Trophy	5	62.05	3	128.20	5	190.25
Dec 5–7, 2024	(Croatia) 2024 CS Golden Spin of Zagreb	1	68.32	3	122.78	3	191.10
Jan 20–26, 2025	(United States) 2025 U.S. Championships	2	71.23	4	128.71	4	199.94
Feb 18–23, 2025	(South Korea) 2025 Four Continents Championships	5	66.58	2	137.80	2	204.38
Mar 4–9, 2025	(Poland) 2025 Maria Olszewska Memorial	1	72.66	1	147.63	1	220.29

Results in the 2025–26 season
Date	Event	SP		FS		Total	
Date	Event	P	Score	P	Score	P	Score
Sep 5–7, 2025	(Japan) 2025 CS Kinoshita Group Cup	5	64.52	8	122.66	5	187.18
Oct 31 – Nov 2, 2025	2025 Skate Canada International	5	65.55	4	129.52	4	195.07
Nov 21–23, 2025	(Finland) 2025 Finlandia Trophy	4	63.92	4	126.46	4	190.38
Dec 3–6, 2025	(Croatia) 2025 CS Golden Spin of Zagreb	1	62.80	1	132.17	1	194.97
Jan 4–11, 2026	(United States) 2026 U.S. Championships	5	69.53	4	141.95	4	211.48
Jan 21–25, 2026	(China) 2026 Four Continents Championships	7	66.16	4	133.21	4	199.37

=== Junior level ===
Results in the 2013–14 season
Date	Event	SP		FS		Total	
Date	Event	P	Score	P	Score	P	Score
Jan 5–12, 2014	(United States) 2014 U.S. Championships (Junior)	4	55.34	6	86.65	4	141.99
Mar 28–30, 2014	(Italy) 2014 Gardena Spring Trophy	3	49.06	2	91.50	3	140.56

Results in the 2014–15 season
Date	Event	SP		FS		Total	
Date	Event	P	Score	P	Score	P	Score
Sep 10–14, 2014	2014 JGP Japan	4	54.92	8	89.97	8	144.89
Jan 18–25, 2015	(United States) 2015 U.S. Championships (Junior)	1	59.38	1	116.98	1	176.36

Results in the 2015–16 season
Date	Event	SP		FS		Total	
Date	Event	P	Score	P	Score	P	Score
Sep 8–12, 2015	2015 JGP Austria	9	46.35	13	78.19	11	124.54
Mar 14–20, 2016	(Hungary) 2016 World Junior Championships	4	58.56	14	88.96	11	147.52

Results in the 2016–17 season
Date	Event	SP		FS		Total	
Date	Event	P	Score	P	Score	P	Score
Mar 15–19, 2017	(Taiwan) 2017 World Junior Championships	7	57.47	7	103.89	7	161.36
