= William Rogue =

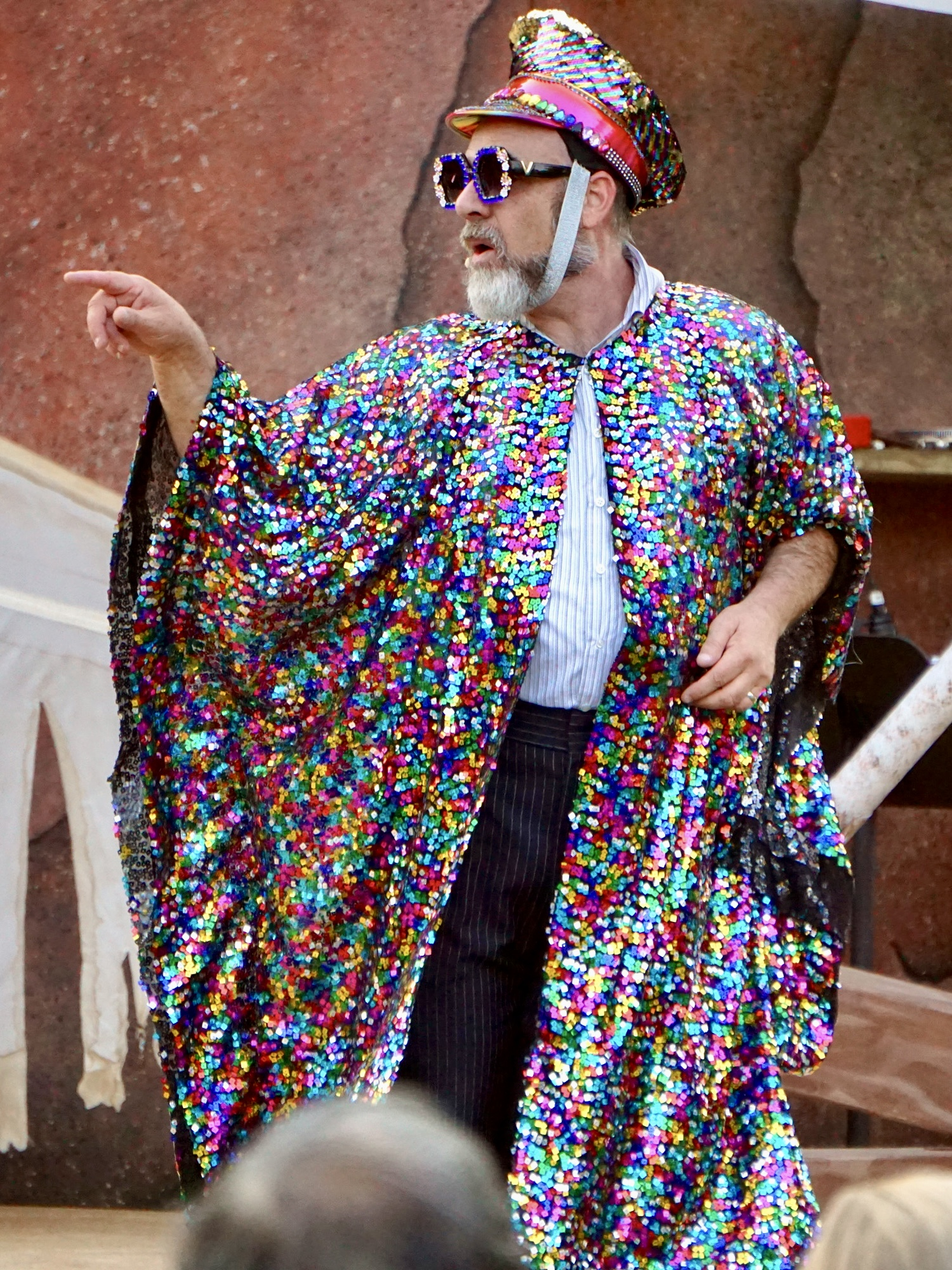
- William Rogue performing at the San Francisco Shakespeare Festival 2024.

Background information
- Born: Stewart William Allan; 13 November 1973 (age 52); Glasgow, Scotland
- Instruments: Guitar, harmonica, Melodica
- Years active: 1992—present
- Website: williamrogue.com

Stewart William Allan (born 13 November 1973), more familiar by his stage name, William Rogue, is a Scottish musician and actor. He was the frontman, principal songwriter, and lead guitarist of rock band The Blimp from 1998 until their breakup in 2007.

== Biography ==
=== Early life ===
Allan was born in Glasgow, Scotland, the second of three children. At the age of four his family moved to Johannesburg, South Africa where his father was employed as an engineering draughtsman. In 1981 his father was involved in a serious car accident that led to the family returning to the United Kingdom in 1982, first to England for a short time and then to Scotland.

Allan attended Shawlands Academy secondary school in Glasgow until 1990 when he left to join the Royal Navy. He served aboard HMS Argyll as a marine engineer for two years.

== Music ==
On leaving the Royal Navy in 1992 Allan enrolled on a music technology course at Stow College in Glasgow. It was here that he met long-time friend and collaborator, Mark Brown. Allan and Brown formed a band called The Bodies, which included Allan's older brother, JD Allan, and James Clifford. Brown and Clifford would later go on to join the Cosmic Rough Riders. During the early 1990s The Bodies performed alongside other notable Scottish acts of the period including Urusei Yatsura, The Yummy Fur and Glass Onion (who would later change their name to Travis). The Bodies also made regular appearances at the Kazoo Club hosted by Alex Kapranos.

In 1994 Allan departed The Bodies to form the Caffeine Cake Orchestra with Ray Alexander, Malcolm Scott Mearns and Del Frame (later replaced by Alasdair Fisher). The Bodies continued briefly, bringing in Stephen Fleming to replace Allan on lead guitar. Fleming would eventually go on to form the Cosmic Rough Riders with Daniel Wylie. In early 1995 Allan was joined in the Caffeine Cake Orchestra by his brother, JD Allan. Until the summer of 1997 the Caffeine Cake Orchestra gigged extensively in and around Scotland, including performances alongside Mogwai, Dawn of the Replicants and Black Iron Skyline (who would later change their name to Bis), and a live television appearance on STV music programme VJ's.

=== The Blimp ===
Toward the end of 1998 Allan, Alexander and JD Allan began rehearsing with Mark Brown, Gary Craig and saxophonist Ara McBay. This would constitute the original line up of The Blimp. In the spring of 2000 Brown departed to join the Cosmic Rough Riders. George Berry was brought in to replace him soon after. Berry and Craig were former members of Rust, which included Gordon Garrow and Kenny McLeod, subsequently of Eska. At the beginning of 2001 Ara McBay relocated to London and departed the band. In the spring of 2001 The Blimp began recording the first of several sessions with engineer and producer Duncan Cameron, which would be released as their debut album, Square Go, the following year.

=== Controversy ===
In the summer of 2001 The Blimp released their debut single Bad Bitch Dog Don't Bite on London based independent label Stuntman Recordings. The single was subsequently banned from radio airplay across the capital. The reason stated was the gratuitous use of the word 'bitch' in the lyrics, despite the song clearly being about a dog. Allan's uncompromising lyrical style and use of Glaswegian vernacular would continue to pose problems for broadcasters throughout his career.

On 13 July 2002 The Blimp hosted and curated the J in the Dark event in Glasgow as a counter to the T in the Park festival happening the same weekend in Balado, Perth and Kinross. Although the event was intended as a snub to the festival's perceived commercialism the band were criticised for the apparent reference to drug use that the event's title implied.

In the autumn of 2003 The Blimp were asked to support the Sensational Alex Harvey Band at renowned Glasgow venue, King Tut's Wah Wah Hut. They would support the band again on their nationwide tour in 2005. The Blimp supported many other acts including Misty's Big Adventure, Ten Benson and Toby Jepson, and were themselves supported by acts who went on to become more widely known, including The Law and Glasvegas. In the winter of 2007 The Blimp began work on what would be their last studio album, Easy Listening with the High Commissioner. Released in the summer of the same year, the album's closing number, "Plastic Fuck Machine", was deemed unplayable by radio stations, due in part to the song's title but mostly because of George Berry's effect laden drum solo that dominates the track. The Blimp made their final live appearance at Nice N Sleazy in Glasgow on 14 July 2007.

=== Solo ===
Allan released his debut solo album, Doodles & Sketches, featuring collaborations with Mark Brown, James Clifford and JD Allan, in late 2007. He continues to write, record and release new material as William Rogue.

== Acting ==
Allan is an alumnus of the Royal Scottish Academy of Music and Drama. In his film debut, he featured in the BAFTA award-winning short film, Sex & Death. His theatre work includes roles in William Shakespeare's Macbeth, The Tempest, and Cymbeline, the lead in Christopher Marlowe's Edward II, Vladimir in Samuel Beckett's Waiting For Godot, a solo performance of Eric Bogosian's Sex, Drugs, Rock & Roll, and multiple roles in a production of E. L. Doctorow's short story Assimilation. He has also appeared in several television series, including the BBC's Hamish Macbeth and Feel the Force. In 2017, he appeared in the music video for Chrysta Bell and David Lynch's “Beat the Beat”. His film work includes the Kodak award-winning short film, Stranger Things, and Silver Dogs, winner of SF Indiefest and Santa Cruz Film Festival Best Narrative Short awards.

Allan currently lives in San Francisco, California with his wife, the writer Fiona G. Parrott, and their three children.

== Discography ==
- The Sad Five EP – The Bodies (1994)
- Wrench Chain Ma Go Go – Caffeine Cake Orchestra (1996)
- Bad Bitch Dog Don't Bite – The Blimp (2001)
- A Thousand Bares Between Us – The Blimp (2001)
- Square Go – The Blimp (2002)
- The Core Session – The Blimp (2004)
- Stuck Between a Rock and a Hard Place – The Blimp (2006)
- Easy Listening with the High Commissioner – The Blimp (2007)
- Doodles & Sketches – William Rogue (2007)
- In Exile – William Rogue (2008)
- The Bitter Suite – William Rogue (2010)
- Eating Lunch In My Car – William Rogue (2016)
- Lemons & Limes – William Rogue (2016)
- Play It Louder – The Blimp (2017)
- Dance It All Away – William Rogue (2023)
- Scroll On – William Rogue (2024)
- Let's Go, Scotland! – William Rogue (2024)
- The Bottle & the Cork – Old Salty (2024)
- Airport Goodbye – Old Salty (2025)
- Hame'lldaeme – Old Salty (2025)

== Film and television ==
- VJ's – STV (1996)
- Hamish Macbeth – BBC (1997)
- A Day in the Life – Raymond Smith (1998)
- Last Night – Fablevision (1999)
- Sex & Death – Cineworks (2000)
- Voodoo – Mallinson Television Productions (2005)
- Feel the Force – BBC (2006)
- Big Match – Thomas Thomas Films (2006)
- Stranger Things – Danielle Katvan (2009)
- Copy & Pastry – Two Trick Pony Productions (2009)
- Education of Saints – Louisa Decossy (2010)
- Spare Parts – Berkeley Digital Film Institute (2010)
- Mattina Presto Luce – Loose Charm Offers (2010)
- The World's Astonishing News – Nippon Television (2013)
- Broncho Billy and the Bandit's Secret – Niles Essanay Silent Film Museum (2013)
- Loose Cannons – Sharif Nakhleh / Joseph Skorman (2014)
- Pale Horse – Maximus Productions (2014)
- Silver Dogs – Erin Drake-Prior (2016)
- Beat the Beat – Chrysta Bell / David Lynch (2017)
- Frank's Last Job – Rey Godoy (2018)

== Theatre ==
- Three Penny Opera – Glasgow School of Art (1996)
- Making Tracks – Tour (1997)
- Ashes in Sand – The Ramshorn (1997)
- Looking After Norman – Tour (1997)
- Quad – University of Glasgow (1997)
- Breadmakers – Tour (1997)
- Double Dare – Tour (1997)
- Heart of Darkness – The Arches (1998)
- Rab Ha' – Tour (1998)
- Edward II – The Ramshorn (1998)
- Last Night – Tour (1999)
- The Lost Boy – The Ramshorn (1999)
- Waiting For Godot – Tour (1999)
- Stone of Destiny – Tour (2000)
- Not about Nightingales – Tour (2000)
- Picasso at the Lapin Agile – The Ramshorn (2001)
- Sex, Drugs, Rock & Roll – The Ramshorn (2001)
- Closer – EXIT Theatre (2012)
- Macbeth – San Francisco Shakespeare Festival (2013)
- Cymbeline – San Francisco Shakespeare Festival (2023)
- The Tempest – San Francisco Shakespeare Festival (2024)
- Assimilation – Z Space (2026)
