= Colonel Blimp (disambiguation) =

Colonel Blimp is a British cartoon character.

Colonel Blimp may also refer to:

- The Life and Death of Colonel Blimp, a 1943 British romantic drama war film
- Colonel Blimp (production company), the video production branch of the British production company Blink

== See also ==
- Blimp (disambiguation)
