= Alan Fletcher (artist) =

Scottish artist (1930–1958)

Alan Fletcher (27 March 1930 – 1 August 1958) was a Scottish artist. He has been described as "one of the most exciting young artists of his generation".

== Life ==
Alan Robert Tregoning Williams Fletcher was born in Anderston, Glasgow, on 27 March 1930 to Archibald Fletcher, an engine fitter, and Mary Giles, a hotel waitress. Fletcher grew up living with family in the Cowcaddens, a working-class district in central Glasgow. He was educated at Woodside Secondary School.

Fletcher completed his National Service in the Intelligence Corps from 1949 to 1950, rising to the rank of sergeant. He enrolled at the Glasgow School of Art in 1951 and gained a Diploma in Sculpture and Modelling in 1957, having repeated two years of studentship. He made significant contributions to student magazines throughout his time at art school and developed close relationships with contemporaries including Alasdair Gray, Carole Gibbons, Douglas Abercrombie and John Glashan, all of whom went on to become artists of note.

Fletcher painted extensively from around 1955 until his death in 1958, contributing to exhibitions in Glasgow, Edinburgh, London, New York, and Moscow, to positive critical responses.

Fletcher was awarded a John Keppie Travelling Scholarship by the Glasgow School of Art, which allowed him to further his studies through an excursion to Europe in the summer of 1958. While visiting Milan, Fletcher stepped over a low wall which hid a sudden drop of around 22 feet (6.7 m). He was found dead in the yard of a student hostel on 1 August 1958. He was 28 years old. His body was buried in Milan.

== Work ==
Although his talent for sculpture earned him a Diploma, Fletcher was concerned mainly with painting; the Memorial Exhibition of his work comprised 73 paintings, compared to only 13 sculptures (as well as 49 drawings and prints). His oeuvre was informed by the work of contemporary European painters such as Nicholas de Staël, Alberto Giacometti, and those associated with Herbert Read's "Geometry of Fear", while the iconography of many of his mature paintings – which often feature men balancing on wheels or carrying ladders – reveals an interest in British and American graphic art. Fletcher created a body of work which "sums up much of the mood of his time", but is nevertheless highly personal. The image of a fearful man balancing on a wheel and, in at least one instance, falling to his death, attracted great interest in the years after 1958, given the nature of Fletcher's death. According to Benno Schotz, these works might amount to a "premonition that one day fate would play a trick on him".

== Legacy ==
Alan Fletcher's Memorial Exhibition, organised by his friends with the support of the Scottish Committee of the Arts Council of Great Britain (the precursor to Creative Scotland), took place in the McLellan Galleries in Glasgow, in June 1959. The Hunterian Art Gallery and the Arts Council bought several works.

Fletcher's work is held in the collections of several public bodies in Scotland, including Dundee Art Gallery, whose Keeper, William Hardie, bought three examples in 1967.

Alasdair Gray based the character of Aitken Drummond in his 1981 novel Lanark: A Life in Four Books on Fletcher, whose likeness appears on the book's cover.

In 1985, Gray included Fletcher's work in a group exhibition which introduced his oeuvre to a fresh audience in the wake of Gray's success as a novelist and the success of the figurative painters (Steven Campbell, Ken Currie, Adrian Wiszniewski and Peter Howson and others) who had emerged from the Glasgow School of Art earlier in the decade. Gray set Fletcher's work alongside his own and that of John Connelly, Carole Gibbons and Alasdair Taylor.
