= Jenny of Oldstones =

Game of Thrones song performed by Florence and the Machine

Single by Florence and the Machine

from the album Game of Thrones: Season 8
- Released: 22 April 2019
- Genre: Folk
- Length: 3:09
- Label: HBO; Universal
- Songwriters: Ramin Djawadi; Daniel Weiss; David Benioff; George R. R. Martin
- Producers: Doveman; Florence Welch

Florence and the Machine singles chronology
"Moderation" (2019)	"Jenny of Oldstones" (2019)	"Light of Love" (2020)

Lyric video
- "Jenny of Oldstones" on YouTube

"Jenny of Oldstones", alternatively titled "My Jenny's Song", is a song appearing in the HBO epic fantasy television series Game of Thrones. It was included in two separate parts in the second episode of the series' eighth season, "A Knight of the Seven Kingdoms". In the first instance of the song, it was performed during the episode by character Podrick Payne, portrayed by Scottish actor Daniel Portman. The song then played during the episode's end credits, performed by English indie rock band Florence and the Machine. Florence and the Machine released the song as a single the day after the episode aired, on 22 April 2019. The song was released by HBO and record label Universal Music Group.

== Background ==
"Jenny of Oldstones" is an adaptation of a fictional folk song mentioned in George R. R. Martin's fantasy novel series A Song of Ice and Fire, on which Game of Thrones is based. In the third novel in the series, A Storm of Swords, a mysterious elderly woods witch nicknamed "the Ghost of High Heart" asks the singer Tom of Sevenstreams to perform "my Jenny's song" as payment for her prophecies. Only one line of the song, "High in the halls of the kings who are gone, Jenny would dance with her ghosts", is quoted in the novel series, appearing in the epilogue chapter of A Storm of Swords.

In the fictional history of A Song of Ice and Fire, the titular Jenny of Oldstones was a peasant girl whom the prince Duncan Targaryen gave up his inheritance to marry.

The television version of the song is a folk ballad with influences of Celtic music. The song was written by Iranian-German composer Ramin Djawadi, who composed all the music for Game of Thrones; and screenwriters D. B. Weiss and David Benioff, who added more lyrics to the fragment written by Martin in A Storm of Swords. Florence and the Machine's recording of it was produced by American musician Doveman and Florence and the Machine frontwoman Florence Welch. Weiss and Benioff reportedly approached Welch in 2012 to record the song "The Rains of Castamere", although she had turned down their request. Following the release of "Jenny of Oldstones", Welch stated in an interview with The New York Times that this was during her "wild years", when she was "less focused".

In the episode "A Knight of the Seven Kingdoms", the studio version of the song by Welch was played over the closing credits. The song was however first heard from the character Podrick Payne (played by Daniel Portman), who sang a verse in a sequence reminiscent of the scene in The Lord of the Rings: The Return of the King when Pippin sang "The Edge of Night" before the battle of Minas Tirith. The version sung by Portman is simplified in its harmonies, while the version by Welch is close to how Djawadi originally wrote it with more chord changes.

== Commercial performance ==
"Jenny of Oldstones" debuted at number 75 in the UK and 64 in Ireland. It was the seventh best-selling digital song the week it was released in the United States. In Belgium, the song did not enter the Ultratop 50 or Ultratip 50, but did appear on the Flemish extra tips chart.

== Credits and personnel ==
Credits adapted from YouTube, provided by Universal Music Group.

- Florence Welch – lead vocals, music production
- Doveman – music production, mixing, keyboards, programming
- Chris Gehringer – mastering
- D. B. Weiss – composing, songwriting
- David Benioff – composing, songwriting
- Ramin Djawadi – composing, songwriting
- George R. R. Martin – composing, songwriting

== Charts ==
=== Weekly charts ===
Chart (2019)	Peak position
Australia Digital Tracks (ARIA)	21
Belgium (Ultratip Bubbling Under Flanders)	17
China Airplay/FL (Billboard)	48
Greece (IFPI)	4
Hungary (Single Top 40)	1
Hungary (Stream Top 40)	25
Ireland (IRMA)	56
France Digital Tracks (SNEP)	20
New Zealand Hot Singles (RMNZ)	18
Scottish Singles Sales (Official Charts)	16
Slovakia Singles Digital (ČNS IFPI)	79
Switzerland (Schweizer Hitparade)	74
UK Singles (Official Charts)	71
US Hot Rock & Alternative Songs (Billboard)	7

=== Year-end charts ===
Chart (2019)	Position
Hungary (Single Top 40)	58
US Rock Digital Song Sales (Billboard)	35

== See also ==
- Music of Game of Thrones
