= A Knight of the Seven Kingdoms (Game of Thrones) =

- Game of Thrones episode
- Episode no.: Season 8 Episode 2
- Directed by: David Nutter
- Written by: Bryan Cogman
- Cinematography by: David Franco
- Editing by: Crispin Green
- Original air date: April 21, 2019
- Running time: 57 minutes

Guest appearances
- Richard Dormer as Beric Dondarrion; Ben Crompton as Eddison Tollett; Daniel Portman as Podrick Payne; Bella Ramsey as Lyanna Mormont; Rupert Vansittart as Yohn Royce; Richard Rycroft as Maester Wolkan; Megan Parkinson as Alys Karstark; Staz Nair as Qhono; Rosa Frazer as Girl with Scarred Face

Episode chronology
← Previous "Winterfell"	Next → "The Long Night"
- Game of Thrones season 8

"A Knight of the Seven Kingdoms" is the second episode of the eighth season of HBO's fantasy television series Game of Thrones, and the 69th overall. It was written by Bryan Cogman, and directed by David Nutter. It aired on April 21, 2019.

The episode takes place entirely in Winterfell and is dedicated to the buildup before the battle between the living and the dead. It has been likened to a bottle episode, though one reviewer argued it does not meet the definition of the term. "A Knight of the Seven Kingdoms" received positive reception from critics, with many highlighting the episode's balance of the show's longtime characters and citing it as one of the best episodes of the series. Gwendoline Christie (Brienne of Tarth) submitted the episode to support her Primetime Emmy Award nomination for Outstanding Supporting Actress in a Drama Series. Nikolaj Coster-Waldau (Jaime Lannister) later selected the episode to support his nomination for Outstanding Supporting Actor in a Drama Series.

The title is a reference to the title bestowed on Brienne of Tarth after Jaime Lannister knights her and to the collection of stories of the same name by George R. R. Martin, the author of the A Song of Ice and Fire novels on which Game of Thrones is based.

== Plot ==
Daenerys and Sansa both contemplate the fate of Jaime Lannister, who reveals Cersei was lying about sending her army. They let Jaime fight for them after Brienne vouches for him. Jaime speaks with Bran and apologizes for trying to kill him ("Winter Is Coming"), but Bran holds no anger as that action led to both of them becoming who they are today. Meanwhile, Daenerys is angry at Tyrion for believing Cersei, but is mollified by Jorah.

Sansa and Daenerys attempt to clear the air between them based on their mutual love of Jon, but Daenerys doesn't have an answer when Sansa asks about the fate of the North once Daenerys takes the Iron Throne. Theon returns wishing to fight for the Starks. Tormund, Beric, and Edd arrive and tell Jon that the Army of the Dead will arrive before the following morning.

At the war council, Bran persuades them to let him act as bait to lure the Night King, who wishes to kill him. Theon volunteers to defend Bran with the Ironborn, and Jon and Daenerys plan to ambush and destroy the Night King when he reveals himself.

Arya talks to the Hound, and asks him why he came North since he's only ever fought for himself, and he retorts that he had fought for her ("The Children"). Arya then visits Gendry. He reveals he is a bastard of Robert Baratheon. Wanting to lose her virginity before the battle, Arya seduces and sleeps with Gendry.

Tyrion, Jaime, Brienne, Podrick, Davos, and Tormund gather in the meeting hall to drink before the battle. The conversation turns to why women cannot be knighted; in response to Tormund's remark that he would knight Brienne without hesitation, Jaime knights an emotional Brienne.

Jorah fails at attempting to stop Lyanna Mormont from fighting in the battle. Sam approaches Jorah and gives him House Tarly's Valyrian sword Heartsbane, out of gratitude for the influence Jorah's father Jeor had on him.

Daenerys visits Jon in the crypts and he reveals his true parentage to her, but she is skeptical about the reliability of the information. They are interrupted by horn blasts signaling the approach of the Army of the Dead.

== Production ==
=== Writing ===
The episode was written by "series veteran" Bryan Cogman. This was his eleventh and final script of the series overall. For him "the biggest challenge was not writing a Wikipedia page." The episode adapts material from the unpublished novels The Winds of Winter and A Dream of Spring, along with original material not published in George R. R. Martin's novels.

=== Filming ===
The episode was directed by David Nutter, his second of three episodes this season. The outdoor Winterfell scenes were filmed at sets in Moneyglass and Magheramorne in Northern Ireland, with indoor scenes filmed at Paint Hall studios in Belfast. Executive producers David Benioff and D. B. Weiss let Maisie Williams decide how much of her body to show on camera during her sex scene; she didn't believe that Arya's nakedness was central to the narrative, and she "kept [herself] pretty private."

=== Music ===
The episode features a song called "Jenny's Song", sung by Podrick while many of the characters were drinking by the fire before the upcoming battle. The first line of the song appeared in the book A Storm of Swords; the writers wrote the rest of the lyrics while series composer Ramin Djawadi set it to music. Another version of the song, titled "Jenny of Oldstones", was sung by the band Florence and the Machine and played over the ending credits.

== Reception ==
=== Ratings ===
The episode was viewed by 10.29 million viewers on its initial live broadcast on HBO, and an additional 5.61 million viewers on streaming platforms, for a total 15.9 million viewers.

=== Critical response ===
The episode received largely positive reviews from critics and acclaim from many longtime commentators of the series. It has an 87% rating on the review aggregator site Rotten Tomatoes based on 95 reviews, with an average rating of 8.12/10. The site's critics' consensus states: "What 'A Knight of the Seven Kingdoms' lacks in forward narrative momentum it makes up for in cryptic callbacks, intimate moments, and the promise of imminent battle – though some fans may find their patience tested. The things we do for love."

Jeremy Egner of The New York Times believed that the episode did a good job with building up the story before the eventual climax at Winterfell and wrote, "In this last week before the big White Walker clash and the presumable carnage and loss of beloved characters it will entail, it was a reminder that the things we do for love can be heroic, too." David Sims of The Atlantic suggested that "audiences didn't need most of last week's dire episode," adding that smooshing the episodes together would result in "a good hour of fan service," before the potential death of some of the characters in the next episode. Alyssa Rosenberg of The Washington Post believed that the episode did a good job of distinguishing between the two sides of the upcoming battle by showing "the warm bodies and warmer conversations between our tragically, beautifully human characters." Rosenberg went on to analyze that the apocalyptic situation facing the characters served as a meta commentary for the impending end of the series, writing, "It’s a sly note to those of us who have spent a decade or longer with George R.R. Martin’s characters, an admonition that even when this hugely absorbing series ends in a few weeks, its best moments will live on in those of us who have loved it and challenged it. And in the hands of writer and co-executive producer Bryan Cogman — who has always, to my mind, better understood what made “Game of Thrones” wonderful than even the men who created and ran the darn thing" Author Stephen King shared praise about the episode on Twitter, writing, "As a long-time storyteller, I'm in awe of how perfectly the minds behind this show brought all the major characters together at Winterfell. They made it look easy. Constant Readers, it is not."

Among the negative reviews, Liz Shannon Miller of IndieWire criticized the pace of the episode and what she considered unnecessary confrontations between the characters and added, "The issues surrounding "A Knight of the Seven Kingdoms" would be lesser if a) Episode 1 hadn't also been so devoted to moving pieces into place and b) Season 8 wasn't going to be only six episodes."

=== Awards and nominations ===
Year	Award	Category	Nominee(s)	Result	Ref.
2019	Primetime Emmy Awards	Outstanding Supporting Actor in a Drama Series	Nikolaj Coster-Waldau	Nominated	
2019	Primetime Emmy Awards	Outstanding Supporting Actress in a Drama Series	Gwendoline Christie	Nominated	
2020	Guild of Music Supervisors Awards	Best Song Written and/or Recorded for Television	"Jenny of Oldstones" (David Benioff, Ramin Djawadi, George R. R. Martin, D. B. Weiss, Florence + The Machine, and Evyen Klean)	Nominated	
