= Carole Gibbons =

Scottish painter (born 1935)

- Born: 1935 (age 90–91); Glasgow, Scotland
- Education: Glasgow School of Art
- Known for: Painting
- Children: Henry Gibbons Guy

Carole Gibbons (born 1935) is a Scottish painter of still lifes, figures, and landscapes who studied at the Glasgow School of Art. After a period of obscurity lasting from the 1980s to the 2010s, her work has been reappraised by younger curators.

== Life and career ==
Gibbons was born in 1935 in Glasgow, Scotland. She was evacuated to the Scottish Highlands in 1941 to escape the aerial bombardment of British cities during the Second World War. While she was in the Highlands, her mother sent her illustrated books about Greek mythology that later influenced her paintings. She attended Shawlands Academy for secondary school.

As an adult, she studied at the Glasgow School of Art in the 1950s and was one of three women in the eleven-member Young Glasgow Group. After graduating, she lived in Spain before returning to Glasgow in 1967. In 1975, she had a solo exhibition at the Third Eye Centre, the first by a living woman. Her work was featured in "Painters in Parallel" at the Edinburgh College of Art in 1978. Around this time, some of her work was purchased by the National Galleries of Scotland. After the 1980s, she was relatively unknown until her work was rediscovered by younger curators and artists in the 2010s and 2020s. Her first monograph was published by 5b in 2023, with a foreword written by Andrew Cranston and Lucy Stein; the following year, the White Columns displayed her first exhibition in the United States when she was 88 years old.

== Style ==
Gibbons's subjects include landscapes, still lifes, and figures; her rendering of these subjects is sometimes abstract. Although her work is noted for being especially colourful, the backgrounds are often murky to the point that only the subject is clearly distinguishable.

Gibbons's early works were heavily influenced by Greek mythology and folklore. During the 1970s, she began painting more everyday subjects such as cats and still lifes, which she credits Paul Cézanne and Georges Braque as influencing. Art critic Cordelia Oliver compared Gibbons to a poet because of the imaginative quality of her work. John Bellany, a Scottish painter contemporary to Gibbons, considered her "Scotland's greatest female painter".

== Personal life ==
Gibbons works from a home studio in Finnieston, Glasgow. She has one son, Henry Gibbons Guy, who is an art curator. She is a fan of James Joyce. She identifies as feminist but not political.
