= Alexander Provan Robertson =

Scottish mathematician (1925–1995)

Alexander Provan Robertson FRSE FIMA (16 June 1925 – 31 January 1995) was a 20th century Scottish mathematician who emigrated to Australia.

== Life ==
He was born on 16 June 1925 in Glasgow the only child of an assistant railway station master. He was educated at Shawlands Academy and won a bursary to Glasgow University in 1942, graduating MA in 1946. After 18 months assisting in lectures in Mathematics he won the Ferguson Scholarship and went to Cambridge University to begin the Mathematics Tripos, gaining a BA in 1951 and doctorate.

At Cambridge he also enjoyed organ-playing under Dr George Guest.

In 1952 he returned to Glasgow University as a Senior Lecturer in Mathematics.

Around 1956 he was elected a Fellow of the Royal Society of Edinburgh. He resigned in 1989.

In 1963 he was given the Chair in Mathematics at Keele University. In 1973 he emigrated with his family to Perth, Western Australia to take a professorship at Murdoch University and to help in its foundation.

He retired in 1990 and died on 31 January 1995.

== Family ==
He was married to Wendy Sadie in 1951.

== Publications ==
- Topological Vector Spaces (1973)
