= Shawlands Academy =

Location
- 31 Moss-Side Road; Glasgow, City of Glasgow, G41 3TR; Scotland; 55.83099°N 4.2837°W

Information
- Type: Secondary
- Motto: Sola Nobilitas Virtus
- Established: 1894 (132 years ago)
- Local authority: Glasgow City Council
- Head Teacher: Pauline Carr
- Staff: c. 100 full-time staff
- Gender: Coeducational
- Enrolment: c. 3,868
- Colours: Purple and Green
- Website: www.shawlandsacademy.glasgow.sch.uk

Shawlands Academy is a state secondary school in the Shawlands area of Glasgow, Scotland.

== Admissions ==
Shawlands Academy was Glasgow's designated International School and one of Scotland's most multicultural schools. It was situated in Shawlands, between Pollok Park (and its Burrell Collection) and Queen's Park.

Shawlands Academy had around 1,250 students and over 100 teachers.

Shawlands Academy dated from 1857 when there was a private school of the same name located nearby in Skirving Street. This private school became state-owned and was then called Crossmyloof Annexe. It served as a feeder school for Shawlands Academy in the 1960s. Shawlands academy in its current form opened in 1894 (132 years ago) in the nearby building on Pollokshaws Road which now houses Shawlands Primary School.

== Pluralism ==
Shawlands was noted for its pluralism. In the 1960s, the school had a particularly high density of Jewish pupils, and was one of the few state schools in Scotland to offer Hebrew as a curriculum subject. Reflecting its status as Glasgow International School, Shawlands taught many modern languages, including Urdu. According to a survey in 2006, over 50 languages were spoken in the playground.

== Notable alumni ==
Academia / Science / Fellowships

- Ronald Arnold – Regius Professor of Engineering at the University of Edinburgh
- Tom Husband – Vice Chancellor of the University of Salford
- Alexander Provan Robertson – chair in mathematics at Keele University and assisted in the founding of Murdoch University, Perth, Western Australia

Arts

- Ivor Cutler (born Isadore Cutler) – Poet and Songwriter
- Carole Gibbons – Painter
- Brian Limond – Comedian
- Jack Milroy (a.k.a. James Cruden) – Comedian
- Jerry Sadowitz – Comedian and Magician
- Reay Tannahill (a.k.a. Annabel Laine) – Author
- Atta Yaqub – Model and Actor

Film and Theatre

- Michelle Gomez – Actress (Doctor Who, Green Wing)
- Eileen Herlie – Actress (1960 best actress nominee for Tony Award)
- Alex Norton – Actor (Taggart)
- Daniel Portman – Actor (River City, Game of Thrones)

Military

- Donald Cameron (VC) – Recipient of the Victoria Cross
- Archie McKellar – Recipient of the DFC and bar, and DSO, during the Battle of Britain

Music

- John Martyn (a.k.a. Ian David McGeachey) – Rock musician
- William Rogue (a.k.a. Stewart William Allan) – Rock musician
- Bobby Wellins – Tenor saxophonist

Notoriety

- Ian Brady (born Ian Duncan Stewart) – serial killer
- Aqsa Mahmood – ISIS recruiter

Politics

- James Craigen – Member of Parliament
- James Dickens OBE – Member of Parliament
- James Dunlop MacDougall – Political activist
- Maurice Miller – Member of Parliament
- Chris Murray – Member of Parliament
- Robert Nichol (British politician) – Member of Parliament
- John Robertson (Glasgow MP) – Member of Parliament
- Bill Wilson (Scottish politician) – Member of Scottish Parliament

Religion

- Bruce Morrison – Founder of the Free United Divided Presbyterian Church of Scotland
- Hugh Wyllie – Moderator of the General Assembly of the Church of Scotland

Sport

- John Bannerman, Baron Bannerman of Kildonan – Scottish rugby union international and politician
- Philippa York (a.k.a. Robert Millar) – Professional Cyclist
- Tommy Yule – Footballer
