= Daniel Portman =

Scottish actor (born 1992)

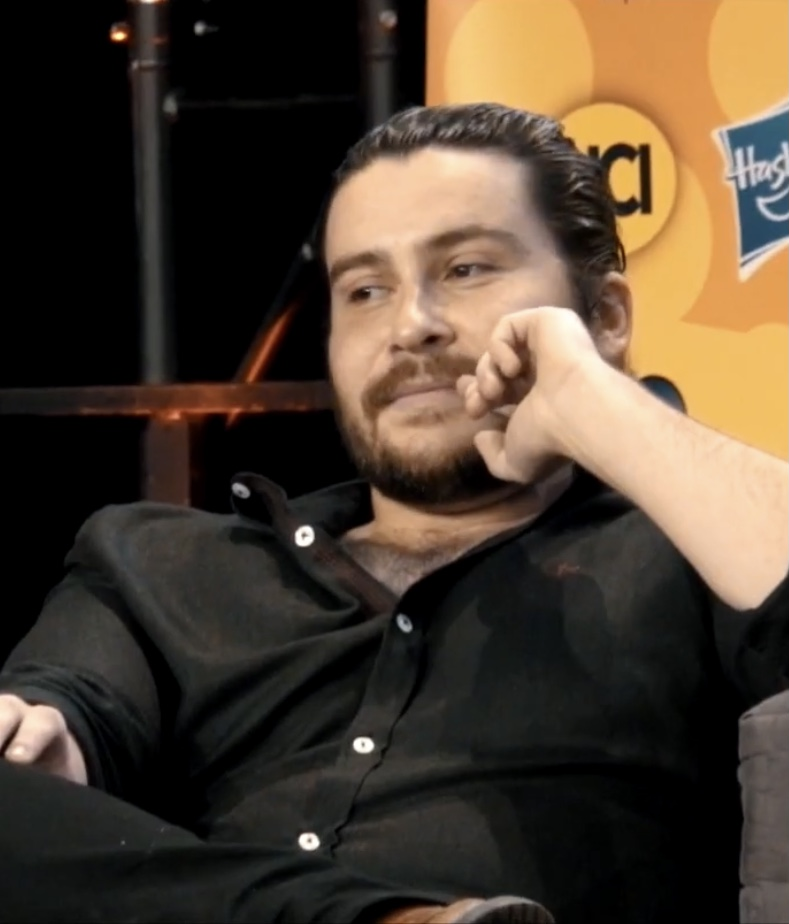
- Portman at the 2018 German Comic Con
- Born: Daniel Porter; 13 February 1992 (age 34); Glasgow, Scotland
- Education: Shawlands Academy; Reid Kerr College
- Occupation: Actor
- Years active: 2010–present
- Father: Ron Donachie

Daniel Porter (born 13 February 1992), known professionally as Daniel Portman, is a Scottish actor. He is best known for playing the role of Podrick Payne in the television series Game of Thrones (2012–2019). He has since appeared as Stuart in the Black Mirror episode "Loch Henry" (2023).

== Early life ==
Portman is the son of actor Ron Donachie and Fiona Biggar, and has a sister Naomi. He was born in Glasgow and grew up in Strathbungo on the city's Southside. He attended Shawlands Academy, where he played rugby and was named Head Boy. He then pursued a Higher National Certificate (HNC) in Acting at Reid Kerr College in Paisley.

== Career ==
Portman has been acting since he was 16 years old. His first role was in the 2010 film Outcast, in which he starred as Paul. This was followed by a role in popular Scottish soap opera River City. His second film role was a small part in Scottish comedy The Angels' Share in 2012. It was announced on 24 August 2011 that he was cast as Podrick Payne in the award-winning HBO fantasy drama series Game of Thrones. He portrayed this role from the second season to the final season. He contributed vocals to a version of the track "Jenny's Song" that featured in the episode "A Knight of the Seven Kingdoms".

== Filmography ==
=== Film ===
Year	Title	Role	Notes
2010	Outcast	Paul	
2012	The Angels' Share	Sniper's pal	
2015	Wasteland 26: Six Tales of Generation Y	Ted	
2016	The Journey	Frank	
2018	In the Cloud	Max Kavinsky	
2019	Robert the Bruce	Aonghus Óg of Islay	
2023	Betrayal	Henry	
2024	Man and Witch: The Dance of a Thousand Steps	Captain	

=== Television ===
Year	Title	Role	Notes
2011	River City	Darren	
2012–2019	Game of Thrones	Podrick Payne	35 episodes
2021	Vigil	Chief Petty Officer Gary Walsh	Miniseries
2022	The Control Room	Anthony	Miniseries
2022	Karen Pirie	Colin Duff (young)	2 episodes
2023	Black Mirror	Stuart	Episode: "Loch Henry"
2025	Fear	Brian Berwick	3 episodes
