= The Blimp =

Scottish rock band

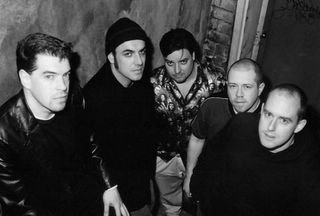
- Left to right: Ray Alexander, William Rogue, JD Allan, George Berry, Gary Craig

Background information
- Origin: Glasgow, Scotland
- Genres: Rock
- Years active: 1998–2007
- Labels: Stuntman Recordings; Green Pepper Junction; ARC; Fast Static
- Members: William Rogue; Ray Alexander; George Berry; Gary Craig; JD Allan
- Past members: Mark Brown; Ara McBay
- Website: theblimp.band

The Blimp were a rock band formed in Glasgow, Scotland in 1998. The group comprised William Rogue (vocals, lead guitar, harmonica), Ray Alexander (Hammond organ), George Berry (vocals, drums, percussion), Gary Craig (bass guitar) and JD Allan (vocals, rhythm guitar). The Blimp released two studio albums, one live album and three singles before disbanding in July 2007.

== History ==
=== Formation ===
The original line up of the band that would become The Blimp came together for the first time in late 1998. Brothers William Rogue and JD Allan, who had been in several bands together since the early 1990s, first recruited keyboard player Ray Alexander. Alexander was an old school friend and had been in the brother's previous band, the Caffeine Cake Orchestra. Drummer Mark Brown, was next on board. Brown had attended college with Rogue and was a former member of the brother's first band, The Bodies. Bass player Gary Craig, joined at the invitation of Brown soon after. Finally, saxophonist Ara McBay, completed the line up.

Taking their name from a Captain Beefheart song, The Blimp performed their first gig at Strawberry Fields in Glasgow on 18 January 1999.

In the spring of 2000, Mark Brown left the band to join the Cosmic Rough Riders. Shortly after, George Berry, a former bandmate of Craig, was brought in to replace Brown on drums.

At the beginning of 2001, Ara McBay relocated to London and left the band.

=== Controversy ===
In the spring of 2001, now with a settled line up, The Blimp began working with engineer and producer Duncan Cameron. Pleased with the result of the initial recording sessions, the band released their first single, Bad Bitch Dog Don’t Bite on London-based independent label Stuntman Recordings later that summer. Despite positive press, including The Big Issue (London edition) Single of the Week, the record was banned from radio airplay across the capital. The reason stated was the repeated use of the word 'bitch' in the lyrics.

In early 2002, The Blimp released their debut album, Square Go, after further sessions with Cameron.

=== Further controversy ===
Disillusioned with the perceived commercialism of Scotland's biggest summer music festival, T in the Park, The Blimp hosted a counter event in Glasgow, J in the Dark, on 13 July 2002. The band were criticised, for the apparent reference to drug use that the event's title implied.

In the summer of 2007, the band released what would be their last album, Easy Listening with the High Commissioner. The album's closing track, "Plastic Fuck Machine", was denied airplay by most of Scotland's local and national radio stations. The song's duration (over eight minutes) and content (an extended drum solo), rather than its title, were cited as the reason for lack of airplay.

=== Break-up ===
On 14 July 2007, The Blimp made their final live appearance at Nice N Sleazy in Glasgow. The decision to break-up had been made several months previous after Rogue had decided to relocate to San Francisco.

=== Style ===
The Blimp have much been likened to compatriots The Sensational Alex Harvey Band. The comparison, however, has more to do with Rogue's use of Glaswegian vernacular and spoken word than any similarity in musical style. The group's sound is primarily informed by punk, blues and funk.

== Discography ==
=== Albums ===
- Square Go – (2002)
- The Core Session – (2004)
- Easy Listening with the High Commissioner – (2007)
- Play It Louder – (Anthology) (2017)

=== Singles ===
- "Bad Bitch Dog Don’t Bite" – (2001)
- "A Thousand Bares Between Us" – (2001)
- "Stuck Between a Rock and a Hard Place" – (2006)
