= Moderation (song) =

Single by Florence and the Machine
- B-side: "Haunted House"
- Released: 24 January 2019
- Genre: Indie rock
- Length: 3:08
- Label: Virgin EMI
- Songwriters: James Ford; Thomas Bartlett; Florence Welch; Matthew Daniel Siskin
- Producers: James Ford; Matthew Daniel Siskin

Florence and the Machine singles chronology
"Patricia" (2018)	"Moderation" (2019)	"Jenny of Oldstones" (2019)

Audio video
- "Moderation" on YouTube

"Moderation" is a song by British band Florence and the Machine, released as a single on 24 January 2019 through Virgin EMI Records. The digital release includes the B-side "Haunted House". It is the band's first new material since their fourth studio album High as Hope (2018).

== Background ==
"Moderation" was debuted during a concert in early January 2019.

== Critical reception ==
"Moderation" was called a "huge, cinematic stomper with gospel handclaps and a gigantic Florence Welch vocal performance at its center" by Stereogum, while "Haunted House" was described as "restrained" in contrast to "Moderation", as well as "softer and more tender". Jon Blistein of Rolling Stone called the songs "brazen", further writing that "Moderation" is a rumbling piano-driven tune" about Welch confronting a "tepid lover", and "Haunted House" is about Welch "tackling the voices that keep her up late at night over a sparse arrangement that swells into a jittery blend of piano, drums and backing vocals". Consequence of Sound called "Moderation" a "rousing number", while "Haunted House" was labelled "spooky and sad". Billboard said "Moderation" "starts with a bang, a rousing intro", and that "Haunted House" "reveals Welch's somber side, with a tender piano accompanying Welch's lilting voice".

== Track listing ==
No.	Title	Writer(s)	Producer(s)	Length
1.	"Moderation"	James Ford; Thomas Bartlett; Florence Welch	James Ford	3:08
2.	"Haunted House"	Welch; Matthew Daniel Siskin	Matthew Daniel Siskin	1:53
Total length:				5:01

== Charts ==
=== Weekly charts ===
Chart (2019)	Peak position
Australia Digital Tracks (ARIA)	38
Belgium (Ultratip Bubbling Under Flanders)	9
New Zealand Hot Singles (RMNZ)	20
Scotland Singles (OCC)	55
UK Singles Downloads (OCC)	43
US Hot Rock & Alternative Songs (Billboard)	12
US Rock & Alternative Airplay (Billboard)	40

=== Year-end charts ===
Chart (2019)	Position
US Adult Alternative Songs (Billboard)	27
