= Andrew Cranston =

Scottish painter

Andrew Cranston FRSA
- Born: 22 July 1969 (age 57)
- Education: Gray's School of Art, Royal College of Art
- Occupation: Painter
- Notable work: But the Dream Had No Sound, 2018
- Honours: RSA Arts Foundation fellowship, 2014

Andrew Cranston (born 22 July 1969) is a Scottish painter. His work has been reviewed and discussed in various publications such as The Guardian and The Spectator.

== Personal life ==
Andrew Cranston was born on 22 July 1969 in Hawick in the Scottish borders. He has 3 children, his partner is also a successful painter. He pursued his studies as an artist at Grays School of Art in Aberdeen, earning his BA followed by an MA in Painting at the Royal College of Art in London.

== Career ==
Andrew Cranston returned to Grays School of Art after graduating and lectured there in the Painting department from 1997 until 2017. He now lives and works in Glasgow and continues to pursue his career as a painter, represented by the Ingleby Gallery in Edinburgh and Karma in New York. In 2014, he was awarded the Arts Foundation fellowship by the Royal Scottish Academy.

In his practise as a painter, one of the recurring themes of his work is making paintings of rooms described in works of literature or fiction. A good example of this can be found in his work Illustration for a Franz Kafka story (2nd version), made in 2007, where he depicts the bedroom of Gregor Samsa as described in Kafka's Metamorphosis.

== Exhibitions ==
Andrew Cranston exhibited work at East International in 2007 and had a solo exhibition at International Project Space in Birmingham entitled What a Man Does in the Privacy of his Own Attic is his Affair in 2009.

But the dream had no sound (27 October - 21 December 2018) is the largest exhibition of Cranston's work of his career to date, that took place at the Ingleby Gallery in Edinburgh. The work, a series of paintings on hardback book covers, was described by the Scotsman as drawing its inspiration from post-impressionism, reminiscent of artists such as Bonnard, Vuillard, Seurat or Signac.
