= The Bells (Game of Thrones) =

- Game of Thrones episode
- Episode no.: Season 8 Episode 5
- Directed by: Miguel Sapochnik
- Written by: David Benioff; D. B. Weiss
- Cinematography by: Fabian Wagner
- Editing by: Tim Porter
- Original air date: May 12, 2019
- Running time: 77 minutes

Guest appearances
- Pilou Asbæk as Euron Greyjoy; Anton Lesser as Qyburn; Hafþór Júlíus Björnsson as Gregor Clegane; Laura Elphinstone as Nora; Marc Rissmann as Harry Strickland; Alexis Raben as King's Landing Citizen; Matthew Wolf as Lannister Soldier; Bronte Carmichael as Martha; Tipper Seifert-Cleveland as Nora's Daughter; Rosie McClelland as King's Landing Citizen; Aaron Rodgers as King's Landing Citizen (uncredited)

Episode chronology
← Previous "The Last of the Starks"	Next → "The Iron Throne"
- Game of Thrones season 8

"The Bells" is the fifth episode of the eighth season of HBO's medieval fantasy television series Game of Thrones. The 72nd and penultimate episode of the series overall, it was written by series co-creators David Benioff and D. B. Weiss, and directed by Miguel Sapochnik. It first aired on HBO on May 12, 2019.

"The Bells" features the final battle for control of the Iron Throne, with an army led by Daenerys Targaryen commencing its assault on Cersei Lannister and the people of King's Landing. In the episode, Tyrion Lannister betrays Varys and reveals Varys's treason to Daenerys; Jaime Lannister is freed by Tyrion; Arya Stark and Sandor "The Hound" Clegane seek personal vengeance; Jon Snow prepares to lead the ground forces against the Lannister army; and Drogon, mounted by Daenerys, burns the city down.

"The Bells" received a polarized response from critics and viewers alike. Criticism was given to the pacing and logic of the story, as well as the writing of the character arcs of Tyrion, Jaime, Cersei, Grey Worm, Varys and particularly Daenerys, while the episode's visuals, performances and direction garnered praise. "The Bells" garnered four Emmy Award nominations, including Outstanding Supporting Actress in a Drama Series for Lena Headey and Outstanding Production Design for a Fantasy Series, winning for Outstanding Fantasy/Sci-Fi Costumes and Outstanding Special Visual Effects.

This episode marks the final appearances of Conleth Hill (Varys), Rory McCann (Sandor “The Hound” Clegane), Hafþór Júlíus Björnsson (Gregor “The Mountain” Clegane), Pilou Asbæk (Euron Greyjoy), and Anton Lesser (Qyburn).

== Plot ==
=== On Dragonstone ===
As Varys writes a letter about Jon Snow's true heritage, one of his "little birds" informs him that Daenerys continues to refuse food. He tells the child to "try again at supper". Soon after, Varys implores Jon to take the Iron Throne, but Jon refuses to betray Daenerys. Tyrion informs Daenerys of Varys' plot, and she has Drogon burn him alive. Later, Daenerys bemoans not having the love of the people in Westeros. Jon assures Daenerys that he loves her. However, when he halts their intimacy, Daenerys resigns herself to using fear to rule Westeros. Tyrion implores Daenerys to spare the commoners of King's Landing if the city bells ring, indicating surrender, and Daenerys appears to accept. She then informs Tyrion that Jaime has been captured on his way to King's Landing and warns Tyrion not to fail her again.

Tyrion arrives at the Targaryen forces' camp and frees Jaime so that, if the capital falls, Jaime can take Cersei to Pentos and live safely in seclusion.

=== In King's Landing ===
The next day, Arya Stark and Sandor Clegane enter the Red Keep amongst the civilians Cersei is using as human shields. The battle begins when Daenerys and Drogon burn the Iron Fleet and the Golden Company, and destroy the city's defenses. Grey Worm kills Harry Strickland as Daenerys' army storms King's Landing. Outmatched, the Lannister forces drop their weapons and the city rings the bells in surrender. However, Daenerys, ostensibly driven mad by rage, does not accept the surrender and, atop Drogon, burns the city while her army participates in the massacre on the ground. Horrified by this turn of events, Jon unsuccessfully tries to stop his men from attacking, before he and Davos have them fall back as Wildfire explosions erupt across the city.

As Jaime makes his way to the Red Keep to rescue Cersei, he encounters and fights Euron, eventually fatally wounding Euron but is gravely injured himself. Sandor convinces Arya to give up vengeance against Cersei and they part ways as friends. As Cersei and Qyburn attempt to escape, Sandor arrives and kills the Queensguard in order to fight his brother, Gregor. Gregor kills Qyburn when he attempts to intervene and Cersei flees. They fight while the castle falls around them, with Gregor resistant to Sandor's attacks. Sandor tackles him through a collapsing wall and they fall to their deaths in the fires below. Jaime reunites with Cersei, but they find their escape passage is blocked by rubble. Jaime comforts Cersei as the Red Keep collapses on them, resulting in their deaths.

Arya experiences the chaos on the streets in King's Landing as she tries to help in the evacuation and is soon knocked unconscious when a tower collapses near her. When she wakes up, she finds the city destroyed and deserted, with many corpses scattered amongst the ash and rubble. She then encounters a white horse and rides it out of the city.

== Production ==
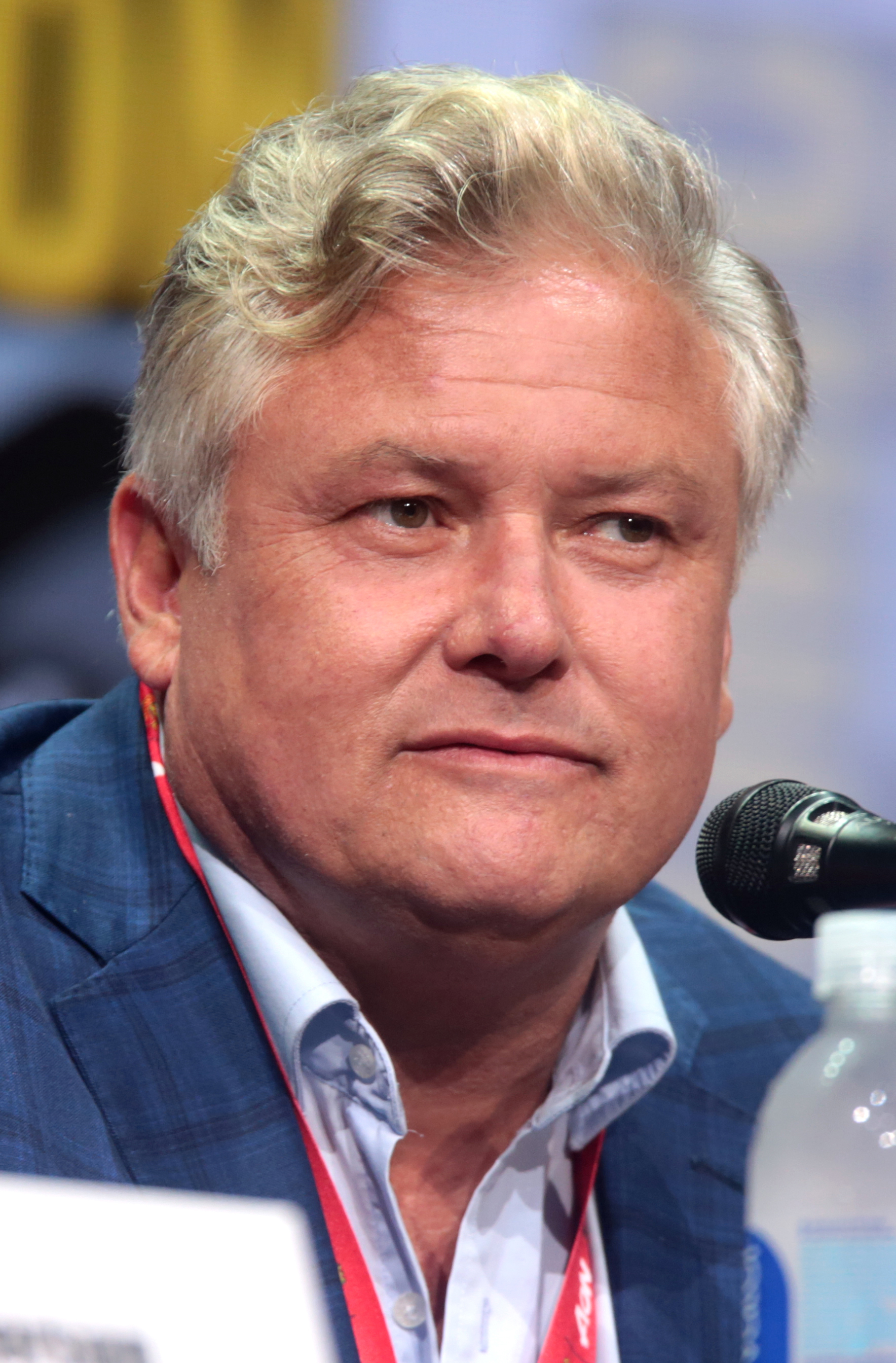
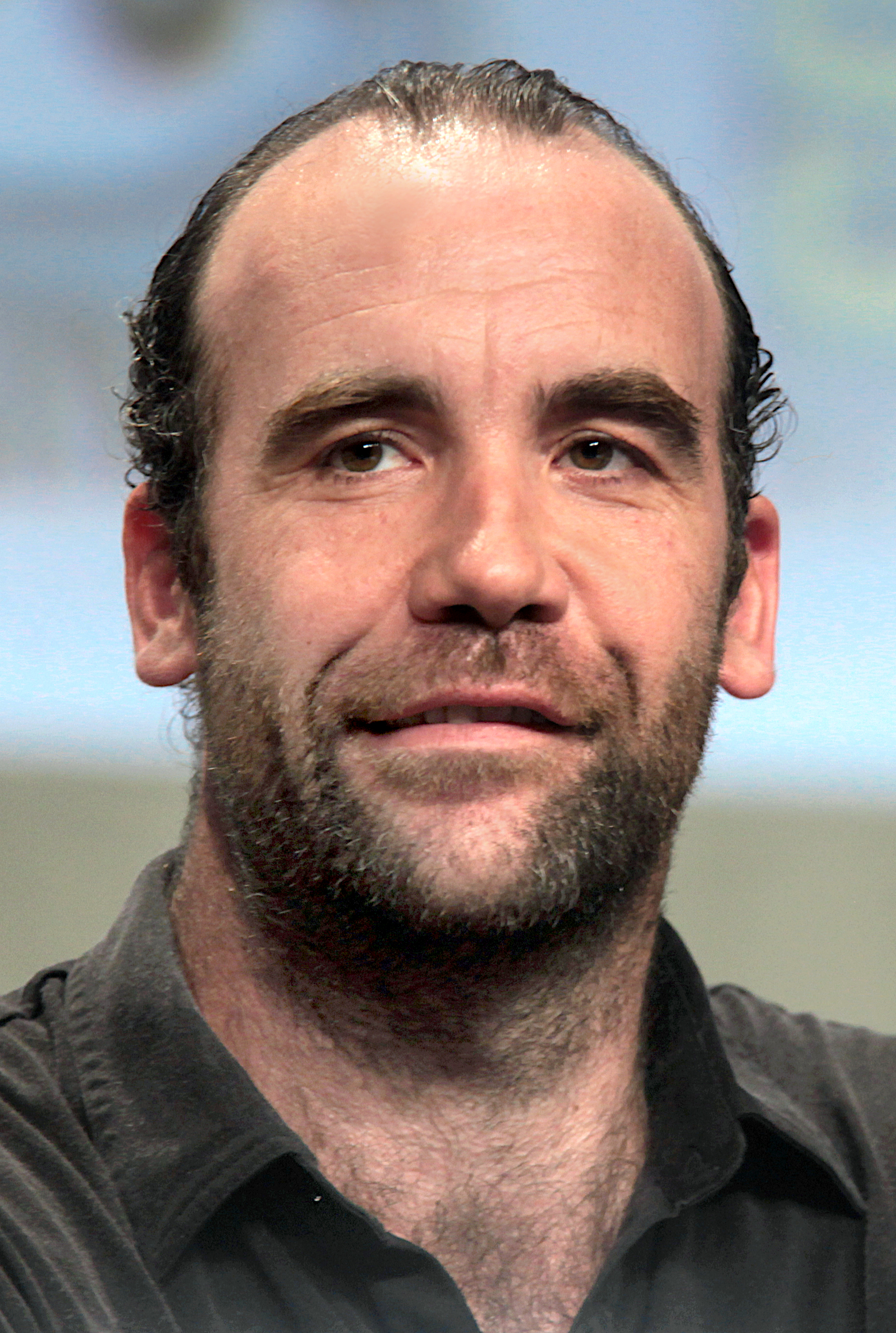
Conleth Hill (left) and Rory McCann (right) made their final appearances in the series.

=== Writing ===
The episode was written by David Benioff and D. B. Weiss.

=== Filming ===
The episode was directed by Miguel Sapochnik. This was his final episode of the series.

For the filming of the episode, the city of Dubrovnik (the stand-in for King's Landing) was recreated on the backlot of their Belfast set. Filming for Varys's death scene lasted seven months as rain kept postponing the shoot.

In a promotional photo of the scene in which Jaime and Cersei embrace at the Red Keep, his right hand is visible instead of the metallic prosthetic the character received in season four. The error in the image garnered attention in light of the previous episode's coffee cup mistake. In the episode, only the metallic hand is seen.

=== Casting ===
Laura Elphinstone was cast as one of the inhabitants of King's Landing who helped Arya Stark during the dragon attack on the city. The American football quarterback Aaron Rodgers appears in an uncredited cameo in this episode.

== Reception ==
=== Ratings ===
The episode was viewed by 12.48 million viewers on its initial live broadcast on HBO, surpassing "The Dragon and the Wolf" as the most-watched episode of the series. An additional 5.9 million viewers watched on streaming platforms, for a total of 18.4 million viewers.

=== Critical response ===
==== General ====
On review aggregator site Rotten Tomatoes, the episode has an approval rating of 49% based on 109 reviews, with an average rating of 6.3/10. The critical consensus reads: "Death, destruction, and the deterioration of Daenerys' sanity make 'The Bells' an episode for the ages; but too much plot in too little time muddles the story and may leave some viewers feeling its conclusions are unearned." It is the second lowest-rated episode on Rotten Tomatoes, behind the finale "The Iron Throne".

Lenika Cruz of The Atlantic wrote that although she found the visual effects "stunning" and the acting "spectacular", this was "the worst Game of Thrones episode ever" because the plot was either too obvious or illogical, with the massacre seeming "an unearned negation of the identity [Daenerys] had spent years building for herself". Emily St. James of Vox found the episode grim and absent of sense, but credited director Miguel Sapochnik for "the gorgeous visuals [that] extended beyond the battle scenes." St. James praised the acting of the cast such as Maisie Williams, Lena Headey, Peter Dinklage, and Emilia Clarke; the latter two, she wrote, made their characters' actions believable even when they were illogical. Alex McLevy of The A.V. Club wrote that the episode successfully demonstrated that "the chaos of war makes villains and victims of us all", with the "progression from exhilarating hope to tragic denouement [being] skillfully executed by director Miguel Sapochnik" with better large-scale choreography than in "The Long Night".

Hugh Montgomery of BBC Culture wrote that characters such as Tyrion, Jaime, Daenerys, and Cersei were "definitively sacrificed to the show's scrambled plotting", and that Game of Thrones was previously "a show that intelligently delineated a senseless world", but that it was now nonsense. VanDerWerff stated that Cersei and Jaime's deaths were not given much thought by the writers and were instead simply something to check off a list. Kelly Lawler of USA Today, saying that the episode lacked substance and was an "absolute disaster", argued that Grey Worm, Daenerys and Varys took actions which were wildly out of character.

Alan Sepinwall of Rolling Stone wrote that the episode's "technical genius" and "the visual clarity only made it easier to see how muddled the show has been, from both a narrative and character standpoint, in this home stretch", with the scorpions turning from accurate to useless, Euron surviving Drogon to have a "pointless fight with Jaime", the setting of Cleganebowl being invulnerable while the castle fell, Jaime easily entering the gated Red Keep, and the appearance of "seemingly hundreds of Dothraki" despite most of them apparently dying in 'The Long Night'. Lawler also said that the writers "threw out their own rule book (suddenly the scorpions don't work and Drogon can burn everything?) to pursue gross spectacle".

Several critics criticized the pacing of events; Lawler wrote that the pacing started off rushed, while Spencer Kornhaber of The Atlantic said that the show was "sprinting through plot check marks". Will Bedingfield of Wired also felt that the show rushed storylines, seeing the death of Varys as being without the climactic buildup previous seasons had. Sarah Hughes of The Guardian said season eight had pacing problems and that this was because season seven also had pacing issues that ensured that the rest of the series would feel "breathless and rushed."

==== Daenerys's arc ====
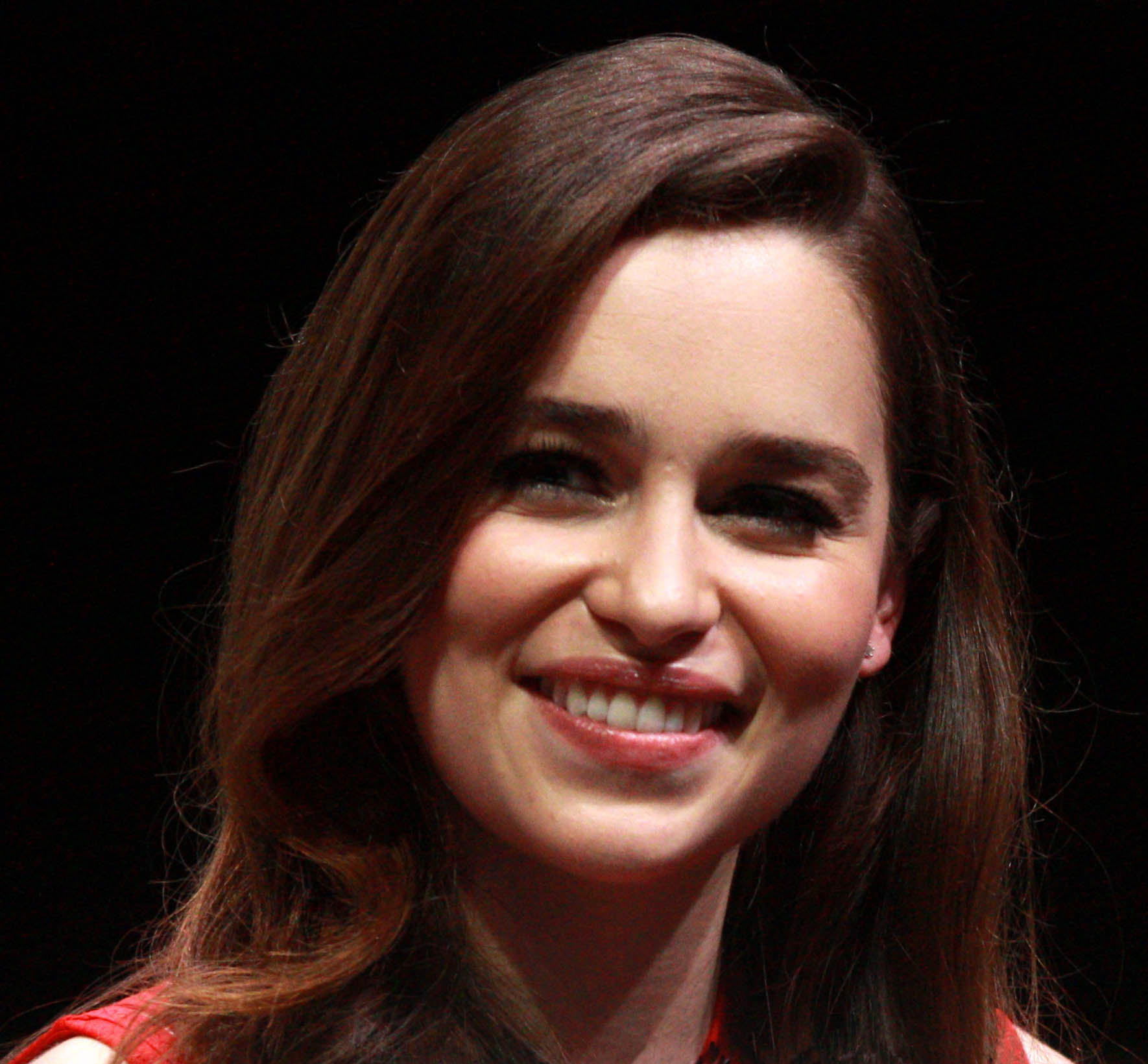
Critics generally considered Daenerys Targaryen's (Emilia Clarke) villainous turn in this episode unearned.

Daenerys's turn from hero to villain was especially criticized, with many reviewers and fans feeling that, because she was built up as a morally good protagonist for seven seasons, it made no narrative sense, or that it was not executed properly within the provided timescale. Mike Hogan of Vanity Fair said that although the show had been clear that Daenerys has a temper, "we have seen her balance that violence with mercy, kindness, and above all shrewdness." Zack Beauchamp of Vox argued that Daenerys's previous cruelties were somewhat logical because she killed people who "committed crimes deserving of punishment" and Samwell Tarly's father and brother because they "refused to submit to her rule," but that there was no reason to go after harmless civilians. He said although the show had been "building toward Daenerys becoming the Mad Queen" and this route could have worked, "its execution was sloppy and rushed" and "it felt as if Daenerys had become a monster simply because the show needed her to become a monster, not because it was paying off a thoughtfully developed character turn." Slate's Sam Adams said "the show spent far more time making Dany a hero" than building her up as the Mad Queen.

The Atlantic staff opened, "Game of Thrones could have easily demonstrated the nasty reality of [Daenerys's] fight for Westeros without putting the choice to massacre innocents directly on her shoulders. Instead, 'The Bells' ended up painting one of the most pivotal plot points in the final season as an emotional lashing-out from a tired, lonely, paranoid young woman." Kathryn VanArendonk of Vulture also criticized the episode for "ultimately hing[ing] on a trope as painfully stale as 'and then the scary powerful woman goes crazy'." Eliana Dockterman of Time criticized the analyses of Daenerys's advisors as also playing "into the terrible trope of the crazed, power-hungry woman" and Tyrion's advice as having kept Daenerys from taking the Iron Throne much earlier and without as much bloodshed. She said she understood the idea of power corrupting "a heroic figure like Daenerys" and Daenerys falling prey to a messiah complex, but that the show needed to evolve her to that point like it evolved other characters to their points. Alan Sepinwall of Rolling Stone stated that Daenerys's descent into madness is the kind of development that requires "at least another half of a regular-length GoT season to feel earned."

Myles McNutt of The A.V. Club said that Daenerys's final arc comes down to two aspects – story development and character development. He said Daenerys burning down King's Landing is a logical and effective way of ending the story on a thematic level, adding that how "it reshapes the rest of the episode is a striking reframing of the violence that has defined the show." Character-wise, he felt that the choice was "undeniably trickier" because one might be led to believe that Daenerys's choice was purely reflexive when it was instead due to "a collection of life experiences that left her believing that ruling with fear was the only path ahead of her." He said "the writers failed to create the necessary structure for [the villainous turn]" and they could have better highlighted Daenerys's destiny as a villain by referencing things such as her prophecy in Qarth. Variety's Daniel D'Addario also argued that it made sense that Daenerys would burn the city because her "tactics have always been more deeply rooted in dominance than in empathy." Arguing that the change in Daenerys's arc has likely been planned by George R. R. Martin from the beginning, Vox's Andrew Prokop stated, "If Game of Thrones ended with a triumphant Daenerys Targaryen heroically taking the Iron Throne, it wouldn't be Game of Thrones. This is the show of Ned Stark's death. This is the show of the Red Wedding. This is the ending it was headed toward all along."

Screen Rant's Alexandra August felt that "ultimately it comes down to your interpretation of Dany's arc and how much that interpretation was diluted by pacing, execution and cultural context, if at all." She pondered different ways she felt the show could have pulled off the arc better, such as Daenerys only choosing to kill Cersei, but concluded that there would eventually be someone else to push her over the edge regardless. Also stating that "there are many ways to interpret" Daenerys's decision to burn the city, Megan Garber of The Atlantic said that maybe it was the Targaryen madness having settled in, or her ruthlessness taking over, or a "crazy edit" by the writers, or a decision "that some innocents must die in the present so that many more can live peacefully in the future," or maybe that Daenerys "having recently lost her second dragon and the apparent loyalty of those left in her orbit, she simply made a blunt calculation about power and what will be required to attain it." Garber said that "ambiguity is a powerful tool in storytelling," but that "it is also a difficult one to wield well," and that "Dany is a savior, and Dany is a monster, and it is impossible to know where one ends and the other begins." To Garber, this uncertainty made Daenerys's actions all the more horrific because logic will not always win and "justice won't always save the day."

Showrunners David Benioff and D. B. Weiss attributed Daenerys's decision to burn the city to having lost almost all of her friends and advisors, no longer trusting Jon Snow, and wanting to reclaim the home that her family built. Benioff said that Jon also being unable to return her affections because they are related played a factor. Weiss stated, "I think that when she says, 'Let it be fear,' she's resigning herself to the fact that she may have to get things done in a way that isn't pleasant." Benioff said that the ruthless side to Daenerys had always been there and that "if Cersei hadn't betrayed her, if Cersei hadn't executed Missandei, if Jon hadn't told her the truth [...] if all of these things had happened in any different way, then I don't think we'd be seeing this side of Daenerys Targaryen." Emilia Clarke said, "Every single thing that's led her to this point, and there she is, alone." VanArendonk expressed disappointment that Weiss and Benioff explained Daenerys's actions as due to her emotions, instead of some "twisted, empathetic logic". Emma Baty of Cosmopolitan also criticized the showrunners' response, stating, "Totally, totally. A woman is definitely prone to ending thousands of innocent lives just because her dad did the same, even though in the entire series, she's been insistent on not becoming that person. That checks out!"

=== Audience response ===
People magazine's Aurelie Corinthios said, "Despite the major plot developments, viewers were left wanting more from a series that has spent the last eight seasons meticulously building up complex characters." She added that "others defended the episode, arguing that while the action was definitely 'rushed,' the main elements still made sense. Plus, didn't we always know we wouldn't get a happy ending?" Lauren Hill of Chicago Tribune relayed that the episode "had fans very divided. Some are upset by the character arcs of certain fan favorites while others saw this coming for quite some time."

Reviewers made note of negative fan reactions, especially to Daenerys's arc. Estelle Tang of Elle stated that many "commented how unbelievable it was for Dany to turn into a violent vengeance-seeker this far into the show's run." Esquire's Gabrielle Bruney said viewers felt that the writers threw out her character development. The Hollywood Reporter staff stated that "many Game of Thrones viewers see Daenerys' acts as nothing short of a character assassination, laying blame for the treatment of the Dragon Queen, Cersei and the series' other powerful women at the feet of creators David Benioff and Dan Weiss." Mehera Bonner of Cosmopolitan wrote that "fans are absolutely devastated" by the episode and that they bemoaned "how the show has been completely ruined by sloppy writing and terrible decisions." She said, "While you could argue that we should have seen a lot of this coming, many fans were... [I don't know]... just hoping for better? Better than Daenerys becoming a Mad Queen just because it's in her family history and better than Jaime reverting to his season 1 personality just because it’s the easy way out."

A petition to HBO for a remake of the eighth season of Game of Thrones "that makes sense" was started on Change.org after the preceding episode "The Last of the Starks" aired, but went viral following the initial broadcast of "The Bells". By May 18, 2019, the day before the series finale, it had amassed over a million signatures. The petition was labelled as "ridiculous" by actor Isaac Hempstead Wright (who plays Bran Stark), and "rude" by actor Jacob Anderson (who plays Grey Worm). Sophie Turner (who plays Sansa) said that "there's always been crazy twists and turns" on Game of Thrones and "so Daenerys becoming something of the Mad Queen — it shouldn't be such a negative thing for fans. It's a shock for sure, but I think it's just because it hasn't gone their way." She argued, "All of these petitions and things like that — I think it's disrespectful to the crew, and the writers, and the filmmakers who have worked tirelessly over 10 years, and for 11 months shooting the last season."

=== Awards and nominations ===
Year	Award	Category	Nominee(s)	Result	Ref.
2019	Hollywood Professional Association Awards	Outstanding Sound – Episodic or Non-Theatrical Feature	Tim Kimmel, Onnalee Blank, Mathew Waters, Paula Fairfield, and David Klotz	Nominated	
2019	Hollywood Professional Association Awards	Outstanding Visual Effects – Episodic (Under 13 Episodes) or Non-Theatrical Feature	Steve Kullback, Joe Bauer, Ted Rae, and Mohsen Mousavi	Won	
2019	Primetime Emmy Awards	Outstanding Supporting Actress in a Drama Series	Lena Headey	Nominated	
2019	Primetime Creative Arts Emmy Awards	Outstanding Fantasy/Sci-Fi Costumes	Michele Clapton, Emma O'Loughlin, and Kate O'Farrell	Won	
2019	Primetime Creative Arts Emmy Awards	Outstanding Production Design for a Narrative Period or Fantasy Program (One Hour or More)	Deborah Riley, Paul Ghirardani, and Rob Cameron	Nominated	
2019	Primetime Creative Arts Emmy Awards	Outstanding Special Visual Effects	Joe Bauer, Steve Kullback, Adam Chazen, Sam Conway, Mohsen Mousavi, Martin Hill, Ted Rae, Patrick Tiberius Gehlen, and Thomas Schelesny	Won	
2020	Art Directors Guild Awards	One Hour Period or Fantasy Single-Camera Television Series	Deborah Riley	Nominated	
2020	Cinema Audio Society Awards	Outstanding Achievement in Sound Mixing for Television Series – One Hour	Ronan Hill, Simon Kerr, Daniel Crowley, Onnalee Blank, Mathew Waters, and Brett Voss	Won	
2020	Golden Reel Awards	Outstanding Achievement in Sound Editing – Episodic Long Form – Dialogue/ADR	Tim Kimmel, Tim Hands, Paul Bercovitch, and John Matter	Nominated	
2020	Golden Reel Awards	Outstanding Achievement in Sound Editing – Episodic Long Form – Effects / Foley	Tim Kimmel, Paula Fairfield, Bradley C. Katona, Luke Gibleon, Jeffrey Wilhoit, Dylan Tuomy-Wilhoit, and Brett Voss	Nominated	
2020	Visual Effects Society Awards	Outstanding Compositing in an Episode	Sean Heuston, Scott Joseph, James Elster, and Corinne Teo	Nominated	
2020	Visual Effects Society Awards	Outstanding Effects Simulations in an Episode, Commercial, or Real-Time Project	Marcel Kern, Paul Fuller, Ryo Sakaguchi, and Thomas Hartmann	Nominated	
2020	Visual Effects Society Awards	Outstanding Special (Practical) Effects in a Photoreal or Animated Project	Sam Conway, Tez Palmer, Laurence Harvey, and Alastair Vardy	Nominated	
2020	Visual Effects Society Awards	Outstanding Visual Effects in a Photoreal Episode	Joe Bauer, Steve Kullback, Ted Rae, Mohsen Mousavi, and Sam Conway	Nominated	
