= The Long Night (Game of Thrones) =

- Game of Thrones episode
- Episode no.: Season 8 Episode 3
- Directed by: Miguel Sapochnik
- Written by: David Benioff; D. B. Weiss
- Cinematography by: Fabian Wagner
- Editing by: Tim Porter
- Original air date: April 28, 2019
- Running time: 81 minutes

Guest appearances
- Richard Dormer as Beric Dondarrion; Vladimir Furdik as the Night King; Ben Crompton as Eddison Tollett; Daniel Portman as Podrick Payne; Bella Ramsey as Lyanna Mormont; Ian Whyte as a giant wight; Megan Parkinson as Alys Karstark; Staz Nair as Qhono; Javier Botet as a wight; Seamus O'Hara as Fergus; Logan Watson as Sam; Finn Watson as Sam; Chris Stapleton as a wight (uncredited)

Episode chronology
← Previous "A Knight of the Seven Kingdoms"	Next → "The Last of the Starks"
- Game of Thrones season 8

"The Long Night" is the third episode of the eighth season of HBO's medieval fantasy television series Game of Thrones, and the 70th episode overall. It was written by series co-creators David Benioff and D. B. Weiss, and directed by Miguel Sapochnik. First aired on April 28, 2019, it is the longest episode of the series, with a running time of 81 minutes.

"The Long Night" takes place entirely at Winterfell and depicts the final battle between the Army of the Dead and the combined armies of the living, ending one of the series' primary storylines. The episode's title refers to the prolonged winter that occurred thousands of years earlier, in which the White Walkers first descended upon Westeros.

The episode received generally positive reviews, with critics praising Arya Stark's storyline, as well as the episode's direction, cinematography and musical score, while criticism targeted its handling of the White Walker conflict and the episode's production lighting. It received eleven Primetime Emmy Award nominations, including Outstanding Directing for a Drama Series, Outstanding Music Composition for a Series (Original Dramatic Score) for Ramin Djawadi, and Outstanding Guest Actress in a Drama Series for Carice van Houten for her final performance as Melisandre. It was later picked by Alfie Allen and Maisie Williams to support their nominations for Outstanding Supporting Actor in a Drama Series and Outstanding Supporting Actress in a Drama Series, respectively. It ultimately won a total of five Primetime Emmy Awards. According to sources, this is the most elaborate film or series battle. It is also the most expensive episode of the entire series.

This episode marks the final appearances of Alfie Allen (Theon Greyjoy), Iain Glen (Jorah Mormont), Carice van Houten (Melisandre), Richard Dormer (Beric Dondarrion), Ben Crompton (Eddison Tollett), Bella Ramsey (Lyanna Mormont), and Vladimir Furdik (The Night King).

== Plot ==
With the Army of the Dead having arrived outside Winterfell, Jon and Daenerys leave with Drogon and Rhaegal to await the Night King. Theon and the Ironborn escort Bran to the godswood. Tyrion takes refuge in the crypts with the other non-combatants while the army of the living assembles outside Winterfell. Melisandre arrives and enchants the Dothraki's arakhs to burn; the Dothraki, Jorah and Ghost charge at the Army of the Dead, but are quickly overwhelmed. Daenerys, witnessing this, leaves to burn the wights with Drogon, but the living find themselves outnumbered. Arya convinces Sansa to hide in the crypts. Edd is killed saving Sam, and the survivors flee into Winterfell.

Jon and Daenerys unsuccessfully attempt to engage the Night King. Melisandre invokes R'hllor to ignite the trench surrounding Winterfell, but the wights use their bodies to dampen the fire, allowing them to breach the trench. A wight giant breaks through the castle walls and is killed by Lyanna Mormont as it crushes her to death, and the dead begin pouring into Winterfell.

Arya is saved from a wight by the flaming sword of Beric, who sacrifices himself so she and the Hound can retreat. They encounter Melisandre, who repeats her prophecy that Arya would "shut many eyes forever" ("The Climb"), emphasizing "blue eyes".

Jon, Daenerys, and the Night King are dismounted from their dragons. Jon attempts to charge the Night King, but is forced to flee when the Night King reanimates the dead, including those buried in Winterfell's crypts. Daenerys fights wights alongside Jorah, while Jon makes for the godswood, but he is stopped by the undead Viserion.

In the Godswood, Theon defends Bran to the last man, but is surrounded by the Night King and his wights. Bran thanks Theon and reassures him that he is a good man. Feeling resolved, Theon charges the Night King, who easily kills him with his own spear. The Night King approaches Bran and is drawing his sword when Arya arrives and leaps at him with the Valyrian steel dagger. The Night King catches her by the throat and dagger-wielding hand, but she drops the dagger to her other hand and stabs him, causing him and the army of the dead to disintegrate. Jorah, meanwhile, dies from his wounds in the arms of a sobbing Daenerys.

As dawn breaks, Davos mutely watches Melisandre leave Winterfell, rather than follow through on his promise to execute her ("The Winds of Winter"). Her life's purpose served, she removes her magical choker, reverts to her old form, and collapses into dust.

== Production ==
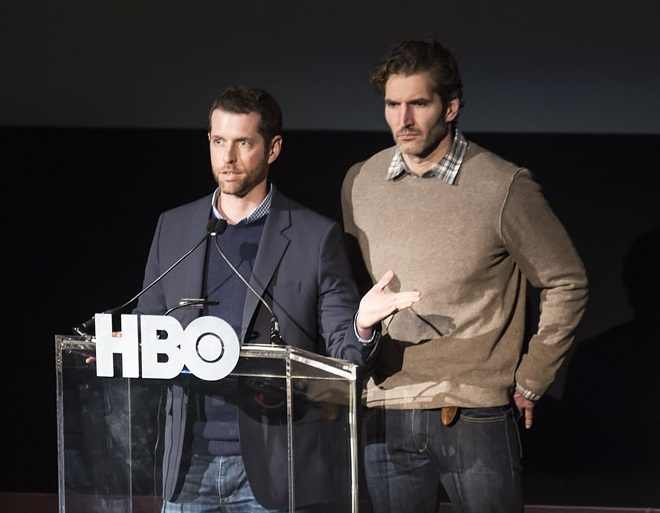
The episode was written by series co-creators David Benioff and D. B. Weiss.

=== Writing ===
The episode was written by David Benioff and D. B. Weiss.

=== Filming ===
The episode was directed by Miguel Sapochnik. It was filmed in 55 night shoots over 11 weeks, and during harsh weather, at sets in Moneyglass, Saintfield and Belfast, Northern Ireland. Cinematographer Fabian Wagner described the shoot as "physically exhausting... they say don't work with animals or kids. We had everything times 100." Sapochnik studied the siege of Helm's Deep in The Lord of the Rings: The Two Towers to stage the battle scenes in a way "to not have an audience feel battle fatigue", claiming that "the less fighting you can have in a sequence, the better". He also shifted the moods from scene to scene to convey suspense, horror, action, and drama. He described the battle as "survival horror" comparable to Assault on Precinct 13 in its focus on a group besieged by outsiders.

The episode is said to contain the longest battle sequence in cinematic history, longer than the 40-minute Battle of Helm's Deep, as seen in The Lord of the Rings: The Two Towers.

=== Casting ===
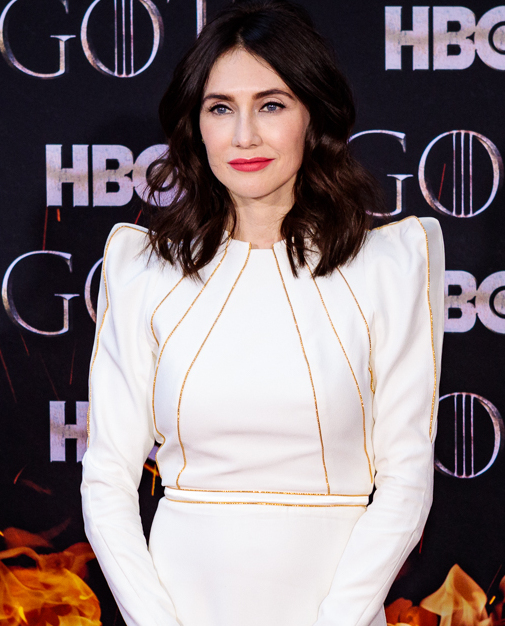
Carice van Houten made her final appearance in the series.

Country singer Chris Stapleton has a cameo appearance as a wight alongside his bass player and tour manager. Stapleton said his management contacted the show asking if he could be considered for a bit part in an episode and the producers invited him to fly to Belfast to film his scenes.

== Reception ==
=== Ratings ===
The episode was viewed by 12.02 million viewers on its initial live broadcast on HBO, and an additional 5.78 million viewers on streaming platforms, for a total 17.8 million viewers.

=== Critical response ===
The episode received generally positive reviews; on review aggregator site Rotten Tomatoes, the episode holds an approval rating of 74%, based on 112 reviews, with an average rating of 8.79/10. The site's critical consensus reads, "Winter is here and Arya Stark may officially be the baddest woman in the land, but despite delivering some epic and emotional moments 'The Long Night' leaves a few things to be desired (lighting, anyone?) heading into the final stretch".

There was praise for the direction and cinematography, with James Hibberd for Entertainment Weekly describing it as "an action epic that manages to weave character-driven stories through clear and comprehensible battle...GoT continues to make every fight unique, compelling and grounded". Arya's unexpected defeat of the Night King was also praised. Alison Herman wrote for The Ringer: "That Arya was the one to seal the deal is heartening, at least...it was the woman who learned to master death and, ultimately, reject it, wielding the very weapon that caused her family so much grief". Myles McNutt wrote for The A.V. Club: "What was pitched by the fandom around the show as an episode rife for death pooling became an episode about a girl who has lost her entire adolescence training for this moment facing the realization that she was not as prepared as she thought, before gaining the confidence—foreknowledge?—to strike the winning blow", allowing "the final moment to land despite an unavoidable feeling of anti-climax".

Many criticized the handling of the White Walker mythology, what was viewed as the lack of catharsis, and the use of dark production lighting which was seen as gratuitous, artistically unnecessary and disorienting. Caroline Framke of Variety wrote: "After years of underlining just how huge and terrifying and all-consuming the threat of White Walker destruction would be, plunging back into 'who gets to sit on that pointy chair' will feel very silly." Zach Kram of The Ringer called it "a strangely unsatisfying conclusion to a story line that has sustained the show from the very beginning... it seems like those most central questions will remain forever unanswered." Some critics also said that the episode seemingly concluded the Azor Ahai prophecy arc without resolving it, as they expected Azor Ahai to kill the Night King, yet Arya Stark does not meet the prophecy's other requirements.

The conclusion of the White Walker storyline and its significance to the ending of the show caused debate among commentators. Erik Kain of Forbes argued that it was a perfect ending to what was ultimately a secondary storyline to Game of Thrones, writing, "The Night King (who isn't really in the books) is pretty one-dimensional and uninteresting. More to the point, he isn't really what these stories have ever been about ... Cersei is far, far more interesting and compelling, because she's a real person with real motivations and fears and love and hate and everything in-between." On the contrary, Alyssa Rosenberg of The Washington Post called the ending an "intellectual letdown, where a big episode of Game of Thrones felt like badly shot and edited fan service rather than a genuine revelation."

Beric Dondarrion's saving of Arya and subsequent death scene were generally well received. Jolie Lash of Collider called it "an emotional and courageous ending", and said by opening his eye after death instead of closing it, the "character remained intriguing". In interviews with actor Richard Dormer, Josh Wigler of The Hollywood Reporter and Leigh Blickley of The Huffington Post noted the barricade of the hallway was reminiscent of Hodor's iconic death in season 6, both selflessly suffering to defend the greater good; Dormer agreed and added it was also "almost Christ-like". Jack Shepherd of The Independent felt the death was "grisly, but purposeful" and gave the performance a 4/5 rating.

Ryan Grauer, an associate professor of international affairs told Vox that "the tension between good military tactics and good television came into conflict" in this episode. Mick Cook, an Afghanistan war veteran, agreed that the army of the living incorrectly placed its infantry, catapults and trench, and ineffectively used its wall defenses and light cavalry (Dothraki).

Tim Goodman of The Hollywood Reporter called the polarized reaction a demonstration of the impossibility of pleasing an entire audience of a television show with the scope of Game of Thrones, comparing it to the reception of the final seasons of Breaking Bad, Mad Men, The Sopranos, and The Wire. He wrote, "Fans (of television) are a combination of knowing exactly what they want from you and the story, not knowing what they want but willing to turn on you instantly if they don't get it, and some weird combination of happy but disappointed or let down, but also unwilling to trade the experience for anything [...] A consolation is that memory (and opinion) fades, and you're going into the magical, mythical Hall of Fame no matter what."

=== Awards and nominations ===
Year	Award	Category	Nominee(s)	Result	Ref.
2019	Hollywood Professional Association Awards	Outstanding Editing – Episodic or Non-Theatrical Feature (Over 30 Minutes)	Tim Porter	Nominated	
2019	Hollywood Professional Association Awards	Outstanding Visual Effects – Episodic (Under 13 Episodes) or Non-Theatrical Feature	Martin Hill, Nicky Muir, Mike Perry, Mark Richardson, and Darren Christie	Nominated	
2019	Primetime Emmy Awards	Outstanding Directing for a Drama Series	Miguel Sapochnik	Nominated	
2019	Primetime Emmy Awards	Outstanding Supporting Actor in a Drama Series	Alfie Allen	Nominated	
2019	Primetime Emmy Awards	Outstanding Supporting Actress in a Drama Series	Maisie Williams	Nominated	
2019	Primetime Creative Arts Emmy Awards	Outstanding Guest Actress in a Drama Series	Carice van Houten	Nominated	
2019	Primetime Creative Arts Emmy Awards	Outstanding Hairstyling for a Single-Camera Series	Kevin Alexander, Candice Banks, Nicola Mount, and Rosalia Culora	Nominated	
2019	Primetime Creative Arts Emmy Awards	Outstanding Makeup for a Single-Camera Series (Non-Prosthetic)	Jane Walker, Kay Bilk, Marianna Kyriacou, Nicola Mathews, and Pamela Smyth	Won	
2019	Primetime Creative Arts Emmy Awards	Outstanding Music Composition for a Series (Original Dramatic Score)	Ramin Djawadi	Won	
2019	Primetime Creative Arts Emmy Awards	Outstanding Prosthetic Makeup for a Series, Limited Series, Movie, or Special	Emma Faulkes, Paul Spateri, Chloe Muton-Phillips, Duncan Jarman, Patt Foad, John Eldred-Tooby, Barrie Gower, and Sarah Gower	Nominated	
2019	Primetime Creative Arts Emmy Awards	Outstanding Single-Camera Picture Editing for a Drama Series	Tim Porter	Won	
2019	Primetime Creative Arts Emmy Awards	Outstanding Sound Editing for a Comedy or Drama Series (One Hour)	Tim Kimmel, Tim Hands, Paula Fairfield, Bradley C. Katona, Paul Bercovitch, John Matter, David Klotz, Brett Voss, Jeffrey Wilhoit, and Dylan T. Wilhoit	Won	
2019	Primetime Creative Arts Emmy Awards	Outstanding Sound Mixing for a Comedy or Drama Series (One Hour)	Onnalee Blank, Mathew Waters, Simon Kerr, Danny Crowley, and Ronan Hill	Won	
2020	ACE Eddie Awards	Best Edited Drama Series for Non-Commercial Television	Tim Porter	Won	
2020	Annie Awards	Best Character Animation – Live Action	Jason Snyman, Sheik Ghafoor, Maia Neubig, Michael Siegel, and Cheri Fojtik (Dance of the Dragons / Image Engine)	Nominated	
2020	Directors Guild of America Awards	Outstanding Directorial Achievement in Dramatic Series	Miguel Sapochnik	Nominated	
2020	Golden Reel Awards	Outstanding Achievement in Sound Editing – Episodic Long Form – Music	David Klotz	Won	
2020	Visual Effects Society Awards	Outstanding Compositing in an Episode	Mark Richardson, Darren Christie, Nathan Abbot, and Owen Longstaff (for Dragon Ground Battle)	Won	
