= The Last of the Starks =

- Game of Thrones episode
- Episode no.: Season 8 Episode 4
- Directed by: David Nutter
- Written by: David Benioff; D. B. Weiss
- Cinematography by: David Franco
- Original air date: May 5, 2019
- Running time: 77 minutes

Guest appearances
- Pilou Asbæk as Euron Greyjoy; Anton Lesser as Qyburn; Richard Dormer as Beric Dondarrion; Ben Crompton as Eddison Tollett; Daniel Portman as Podrick Payne; Hafþór Júlíus Björnsson as Gregor Clegane; Bella Ramsey as Lyanna Mormont; Rupert Vansittart as Yohn Royce; Richard Rycroft as Maester Wolkan; Staz Nair as Qhono; Alice Nokes as Willa; Danielle Galligan as Sarra; Emer McDaid as Winterfell girl; David Benioff as Wildling 1 (uncredited); D. B. Weiss as Wildling 2 (uncredited)

Episode chronology
← Previous "The Long Night"	Next → "The Bells"
- Game of Thrones season 8

"The Last of the Starks" is the fourth episode of the eighth season of HBO's fantasy television series Game of Thrones, which aired on May 5, 2019 and is the 71st overall. It was written by David Benioff and D. B. Weiss, and directed by David Nutter.

"The Last of the Starks" shows the aftermath of the battle against the Army of the Dead while setting the stage for the final confrontation, with Daenerys, Jon, and their remaining forces going towards King's Landing to confront Cersei and demand her surrender.

The episode received mixed reviews, with critics praising its return to the political intrigue of earlier Game of Thrones episodes, but criticizing the episode's writing. It received a Primetime Emmy Award nomination for Outstanding Directing for a Drama Series and was picked by Emilia Clarke to support her nomination for Outstanding Lead Actress in a Drama Series.

This episode marks the final appearance of Nathalie Emmanuel (Missandei), and Hannah Murray (Gilly), as well as the final appearances of six actors whose characters died in the previous episode, but were seen as corpses: Alfie Allen (Theon Greyjoy), Iain Glen (Ser Jorah Mormont), Bella Ramsey (Lyanna Mormont), Richard Dormer (Beric Dondarrion), Ben Crompton (Eddison Tollett), and Staz Nair (Qhono).

== Plot ==
Jon leads a mass funeral cremation for the dead. At a feast, Daenerys legitimizes Gendry as a Baratheon and makes him Lord of Storm's End, the ancestral home of House Baratheon. Gendry proposes to Arya, but she declines. Brienne leaves a drinking game in discomfort when Tyrion guesses she is a virgin. Jaime goes to Brienne's room and they have sex. Daenerys is uncomfortable at the acclaim the wildlings give Jon and, in private, begs him to never reveal his true parentage. Jon reassures Daenerys that he has renounced his claim for hers but insists he must tell Arya and Sansa the truth.

Daenerys plans to immediately storm King's Landing, but Sansa argues the soldiers need rest. Everyone notes that with the losses they have sustained and the Golden Company reinforcing Cersei, the odds are now almost perfectly even. Ultimately, they agree Jon will lead the army on foot while Daenerys and her fleet will sail to Dragonstone. Afterwards, Arya and Sansa tell Jon that they distrust Daenerys but Jon defends her. After swearing Sansa and Arya to secrecy, Jon has Bran tell Arya and Sansa of his true parentage.

Bronn arrives to kill Jaime and Tyrion, but accepts their offer of Highgarden in exchange for their lives. Arya and Sandor "The Hound" Clegane ride for King's Landing. Sansa reveals Jon's parentage to Tyrion, who then tells Varys. Jon gives Ghost to Tormund, who plans to return north of the Wall with the wildlings; Tormund suggests that Jon join them. Jon also bids farewell to Sam and a pregnant Gilly.

Euron's Iron Fleet ambushes Daenerys's fleet and kills Rhaegal. Missandei is captured. Daenerys is convinced to talk to Cersei first instead of attacking King's Landing. Varys fears for Daenerys's mental stability and tells Tyrion he believes Jon would be a better ruler, but Tyrion stands by her.

After learning of Cersei's capture of Missandei and Sansa suggesting Daenerys will execute Cersei for this, Jaime leaves for King's Landing during the night in hopes of saving her, despite Brienne's tearful plea that he stay with her.

Euron reports his success to Cersei, who claims to be pregnant with his child. She orders the gates of the Red Keep remain open, making her subjects human shields to deter an all-out assault on the city.

Daenerys and her army arrive at the walls of King's Landing. Cersei and Daenerys demand each other's surrender, with Cersei threatening to kill Missandei. Tyrion attempts to appeal to Cersei's humanity to get her to surrender. Cersei refuses and has Gregor Clegane behead Missandei, horrifying and enraging Grey Worm and Daenerys.

== Production ==
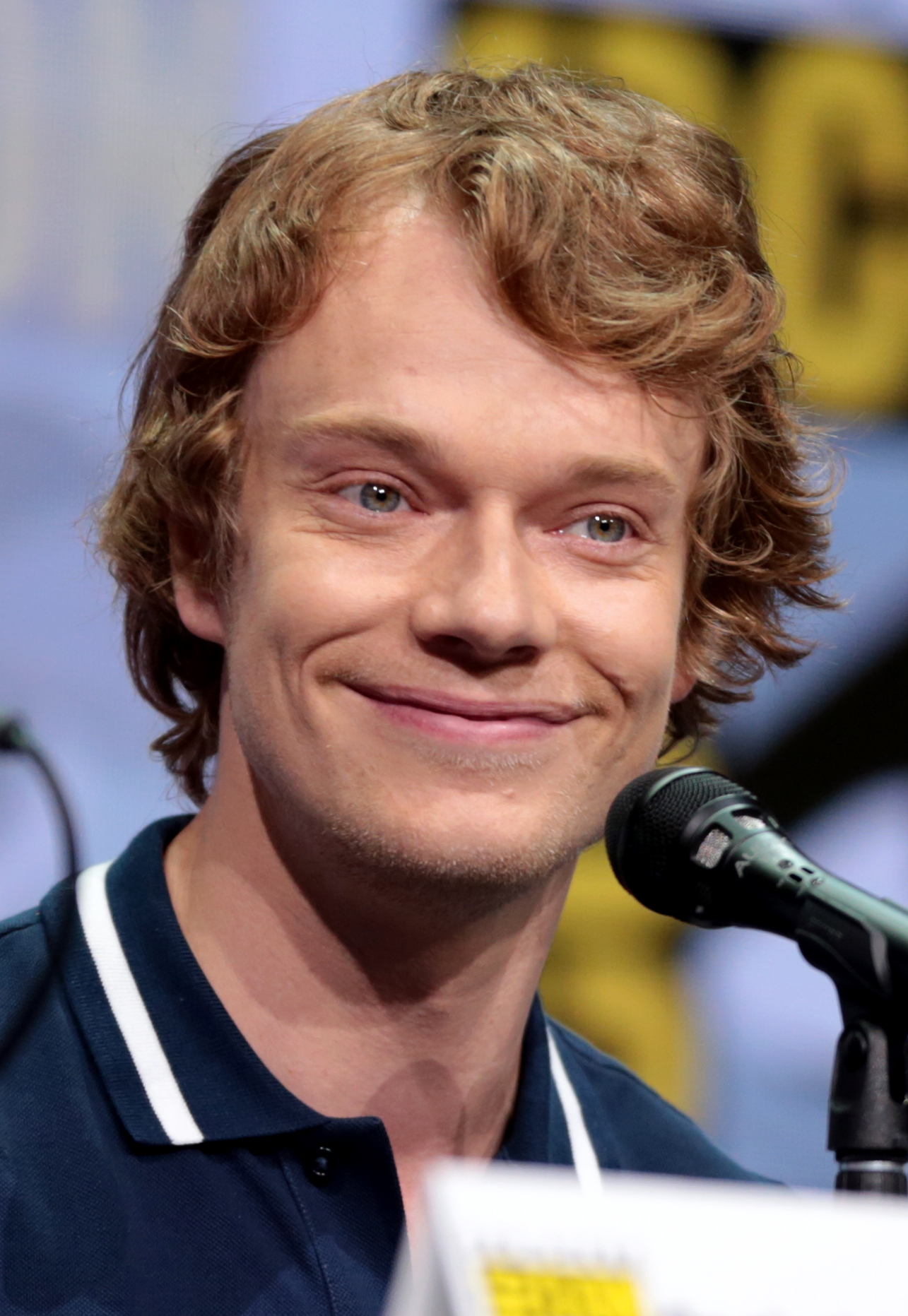
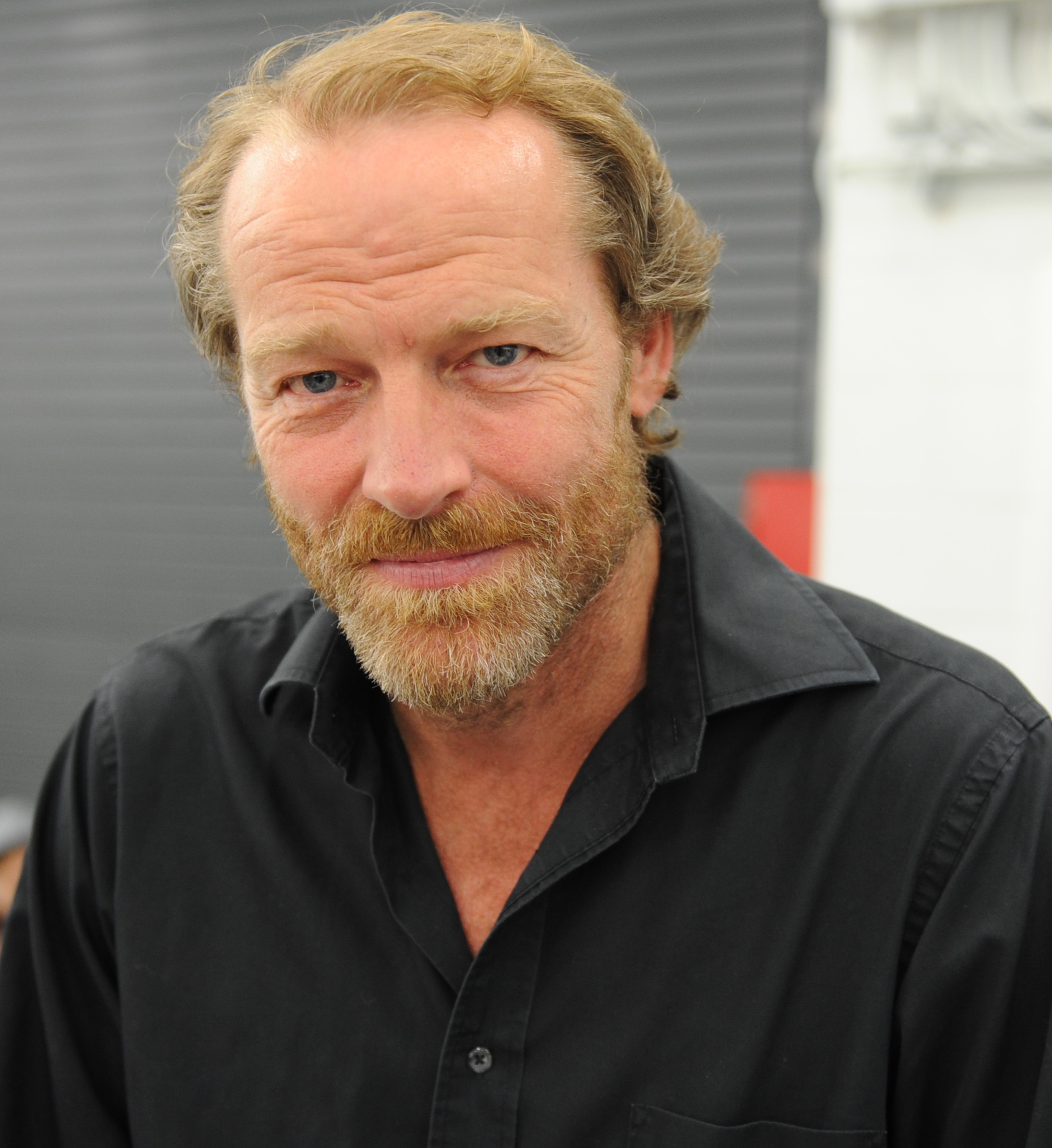
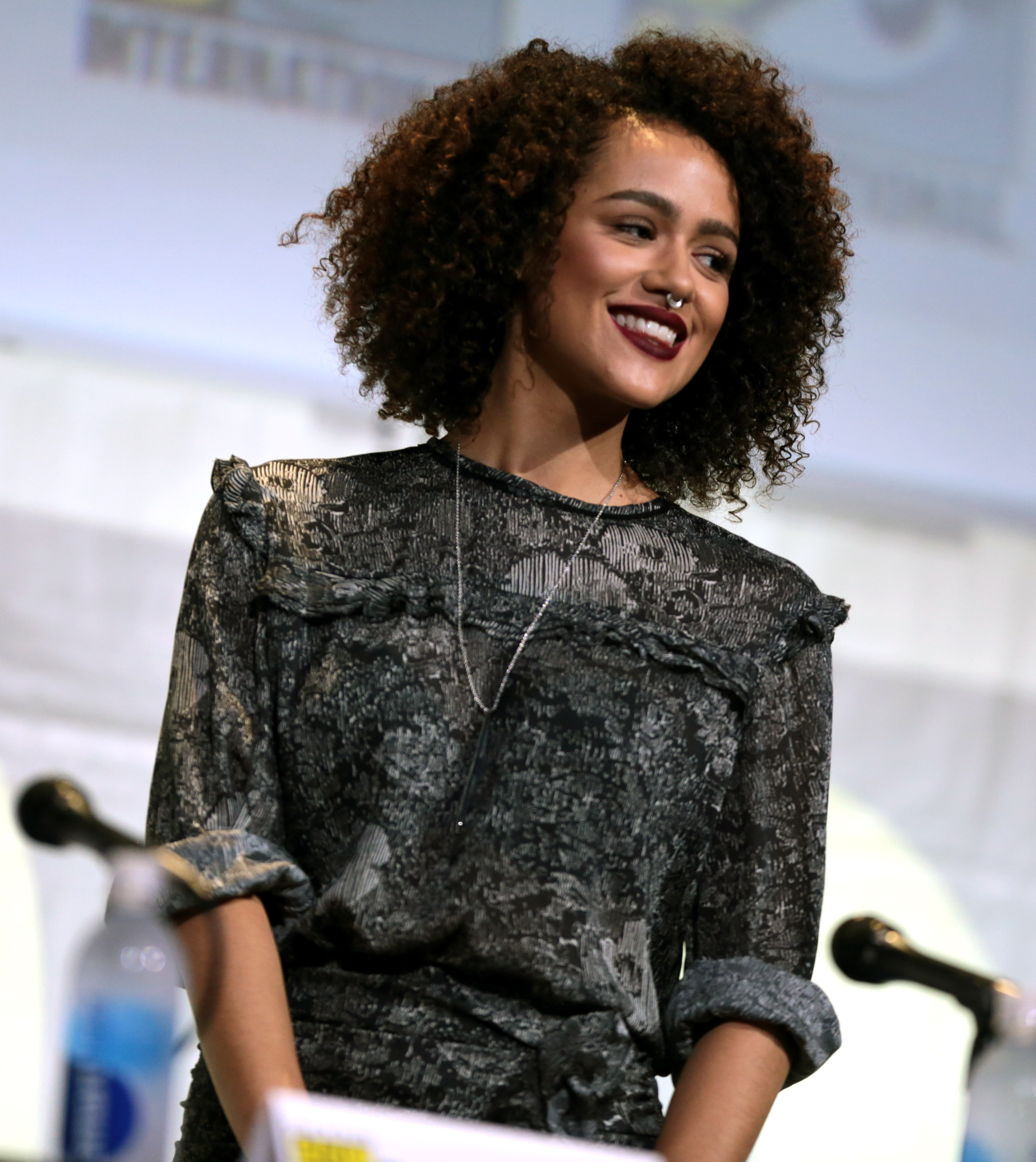
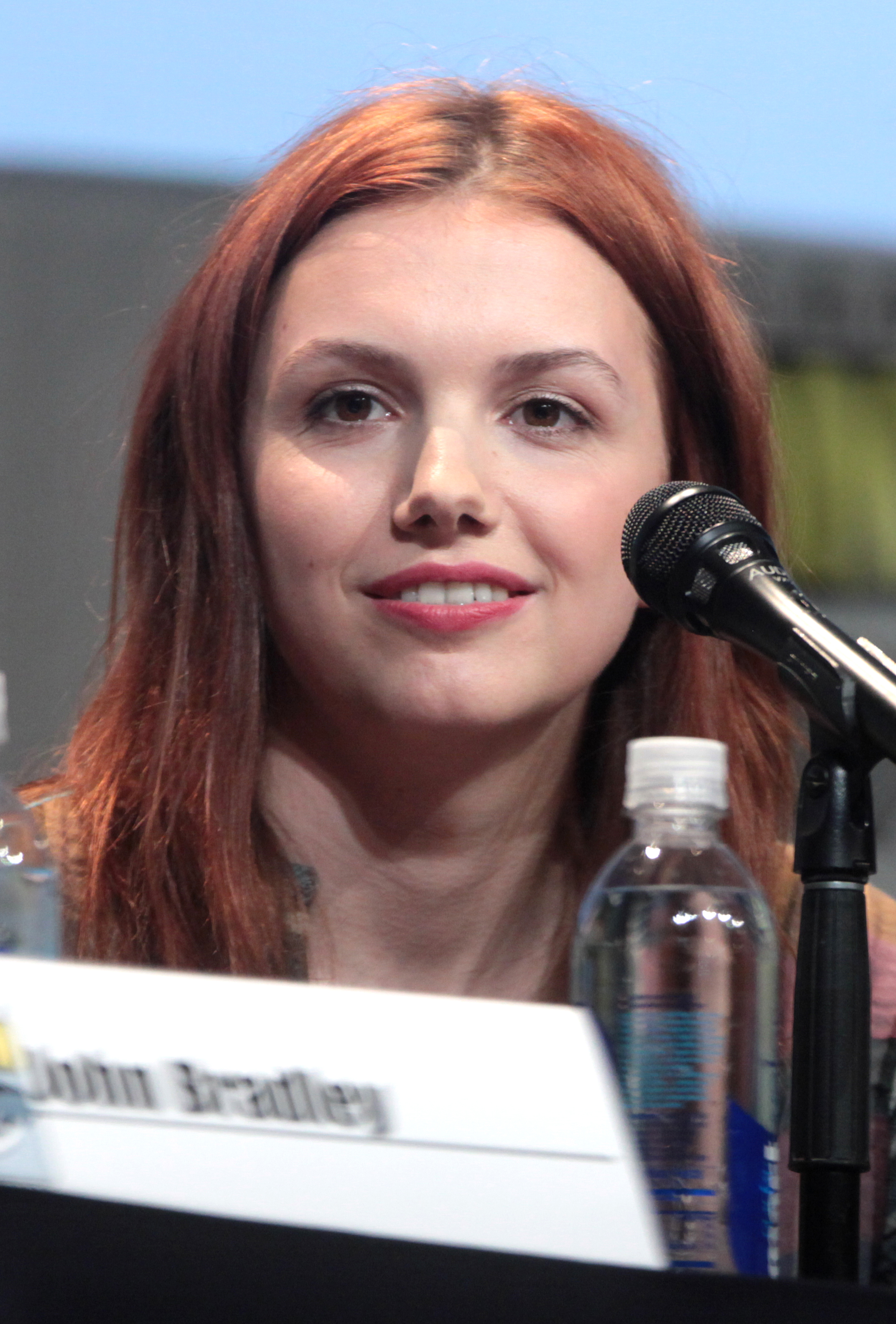
Alfie Allen (left), Iain Glen (middle), Nathalie Emmanuel (middle), and Hannah Murray (Gilly) made their final appearances in the series.

=== Writing ===
The episode was written by David Benioff and D. B. Weiss.

=== Filming ===
The episode was directed by David Nutter. This was his final episode of the series overall.

During filming of the banquet scenes, a disposable coffee cup from a local café was accidentally left on the set; it was briefly visible in the original broadcast of the episode, but was digitally erased two days later.

Actress Nathalie Emmanuel was digitally inserted into the long shots of her own death scene, because filming took place at a great physical height and was exposed to photographers. To keep the plot secret, the long shots were filmed without the actress and her close-ups were shot separately on a sound stage.

== Reception ==
=== Ratings ===
The episode was viewed by 11.8 million viewers on its initial live broadcast on HBO. An additional 5.4 million viewers watched on streaming platforms, for a total of 17.2 million viewers.

=== Critical response ===
The episode received mixed reviews; on the review aggregator Rotten Tomatoes it has an approval rating of 58%, based on 109 reviews and an average rating of 7.01/10, with the critics consensus stating: "'The Last of the Starks' strains to set the board for Game of Thrones' conclusion, but serves up enough political intrigue and touching character interactions to satisfy".

Among the positive reviews, Spencer Kornhaber of The Atlantic wrote, "despite all of the logical head-smack moments ... I'm not brimming with complaints. The episode recaptured some classic Thrones qualities, really." Chris Barton of the Los Angeles Times praised the storytelling and the interaction between characters and believed that "the bulk of [this episode] was filled with the sort of palace intrigue and character dynamics that made the show more than the sum of its dragons." Sean T. Collins of Rolling Stone believed that the episode did a good job of showing the conflicts between humans and wrote, "It hasn't missed a step thematically, moving from humanity's need to stop killing itself and face a common threat to its compulsion to annihilation even after seeing what it can accomplish as a united front." Sarah Hughes of The Guardian wrote in her review that the pace of the episode was just right and added, "Where a lesser show would have hurried the action, moving us swiftly on to the battle with Cersei, The Last of the Starks took time to show what the true cost of the Battle of Winterfell was."

Among the negative reviews, Shirley Li of The Atlantic wrote that she wasn't impressed by "The Last of the Starks" and criticized the "nonsensical storytelling" in this episode. David Malitz of The Washington Post also questioned the logic in the episode, and, referring to the confrontation between Daenerys and Euron, wrote, "Maybe it was just good luck on those initial kill shots, though, because the next few dozen arrows that fly toward Daenerys and Drogon all miss their mark. Every single one of them. Yep." Steve Johnson of the Chicago Tribune believed the show had lost its exciting storyline and, referring to the downfall of the Night King in the previous episode, wrote, "How are we supposed to get thrilled about fighting mere Cersei again when we've already bested the greatest enemy of all time?" Alan Sepinwall of Rolling Stone labeled the episode a "structural oddity", and wrote, "It never feels solid enough. The script races through the transition, piling one personality-altering event on top of the next so that none of them gets to breathe." Longtime Game of Thrones reviewer, Erik Kain of Forbes, stated that "so much happened and so little of it felt right, that today I'm left feeling letdown more than anything, and dreading the next two episodes instead of eagerly awaiting them."

On the "Inside the Episode" featurette for "The Last of the Starks", showrunner David Benioff explained that Daenerys lost Rhaegal and her fleet because "[she] kind of forgot about the Iron Fleet and Euron's forces". Amy Jones of The Daily Telegraph described the explanation as "stupid", while fans ridiculed Benioff by turning the statement into a meme.

=== Awards and nominations ===
Year	Award	Category	Nominee	Result	Ref.
2019	Primetime Emmy Awards	Outstanding Directing for a Drama Series	David Nutter	Nominated	
2019	Primetime Emmy Awards	Outstanding Lead Actress in a Drama Series	Emilia Clarke	Nominated	
2020	Directors Guild of America Awards	Outstanding Directorial Achievement in Dramatic Series	David Nutter	Nominated	
