= 72nd Directors Guild of America Awards =

- Date: January 25, 2020
- Location: Ritz-Carlton Hotel, Downtown Los Angeles, California
- Country: United States
- Presented by: Directors Guild of America
- Hosted by: Judd Apatow

Highlights
- Best Director Feature Film: 1917 – Sam Mendes
- Best Director Documentary: American Factory – Steven Bognar and Julia Reichert
- Best Director First-Time Feature Film: Honey Boy – Alma Har'el
- Website: https://www.dga.org/Awards/Annual.aspx

The 72nd Directors Guild of America Awards, honoring the outstanding directorial achievement in feature films, documentary, television and commercials of 2019, were presented on January 25, 2020, at the Ritz-Carlton in Downtown Los Angeles, California. The ceremony was hosted by Judd Apatow, who also hosted the ceremony in 2018. The nominations for most of the television and documentary categories were announced on January 6, 2020, while the nominations for the feature film categories were announced on January 7, 2020. The nominations announcement for three television awards (Comedy Series, Drama Series, and Variety/Talk/News/Sports – Specials) was moved to January 10, 2020, due to a re-vote delay.

== Winners and nominees ==
=== Film ===
Feature Film

Sam Mendes – 1917

- Bong Joon-ho – Parasite
- Martin Scorsese – The Irishman
- Quentin Tarantino – Once Upon a Time in Hollywood
- Taika Waititi – Jojo Rabbit
Documentaries

Steven Bognar and Julia Reichert – American Factory

- Feras Fayyad – The Cave
- Alex Holmes – Maiden
- Ljubomir Stefanov and Tamara Kotevska – Honeyland
- Nanfu Wang and Jialing Zhang – One Child Nation
First-Time Feature Film

Alma Har'el – Honey Boy

- Mati Diop – Atlantics
- Melina Matsoukas – Queen & Slim
- Tyler Nilson and Michael Schwartz – The Peanut Butter Falcon
- Joe Talbot – The Last Black Man in San Francisco

=== Television ===
Drama Series

Nicole Kassell – Watchmen for "It's Summer and We're Running Out of Ice"

- Mark Mylod – Succession for "This Is Not for Tears"
- David Nutter – Game of Thrones for "The Last of the Starks"
- Miguel Sapochnik – Game of Thrones for "The Long Night"
- Stephen Williams – Watchmen for "This Extraordinary Being"
Comedy Series

Bill Hader – Barry for "ronny/lily"

- Dan Attias – The Marvelous Mrs. Maisel for "It's the Sixties, Man!"
- David Mandel – Veep for "Veep"
- Daniel Palladino – The Marvelous Mrs. Maisel for "Marvelous Radio"
- Amy Sherman-Palladino – The Marvelous Mrs. Maisel for "It's Comedy or Cabbage"
Movies for Television and Limited Series

Johan Renck – Chernobyl

- Ava DuVernay – When They See Us
- Vince Gilligan – El Camino: A Breaking Bad Movie
- Thomas Kail – Fosse/Verdon for "Nowadays"
- Minkie Spiro – Fosse/Verdon for "All I Care About Is Love"
- Jessica Yu – Fosse/Verdon for "Glory"
Variety/Talk/News/Sports – Regularly Scheduled Programming

Don Roy King – Saturday Night Live for "Eddie Murphy/Lizzo"

- Paul G. Casey – Real Time with Bill Maher for "#1730"
- Nora S. Gerard – CBS Sunday Morning for "40th Anniversary"
- Jim Hoskinson – The Late Show with Stephen Colbert for "Alexandria Ocasio-Cortez/Incubus"
- Paul Pennolino and Christopher Werner – Last Week Tonight with John Oliver for "SLAPP Suits"
Variety/Talk/News/Sports – Specials

James Burrows and Andy Fisher – Live in Front of a Studio Audience: Norman Lear's All in the Family and The Jeffersons

- Spike Jonze – Aziz Ansari: Right Now
- Stan Lathan – Dave Chappelle: Sticks & Stones
- Linda Mendoza – Wanda Sykes: Not Normal
- Glenn Weiss – The 91st Annual Academy Awards
Reality Programs

Jason Cohen – Encore! for "Annie"

- Hisham Abed – Queer Eye for "Black Girl Magic"
- Jon Favreau – The Chef Show for "Hog Island"
- Ashley S. Gorman – First Responders Live for "#103"
- Patrick McManus – American Ninja Warrior for "#1116: Las Vegas National Finals Night 4"
Children's Programs

Amy Schatz – Song of Parkland

- Dean Israelite – Are You Afraid of the Dark? for "Part One: Submitted for Your Approval"
- Jack Jameson – Sesame Street’s 50th Anniversary Special
- Luke Matheny – Ghostwriter for "Ghost in Wonderland: Part 1"
- Barry Sonnenfeld – A Series of Unfortunate Events for "Penultimate Peril: Part 1"

=== Commercials ===
Commercials

Spike Jonze – Squarespace's "Dream It" and MedMen's "The New Normal"

- Fredrik Bond – Hewlett-Packard's "Lighter Than Air", Coca-Cola's "Take it Lightly", and Apple's "Nap"
- Mark Molloy – Apple's "Underdogs"
- Ridley Scott – Hennessy's "The Seven Worlds"
- Dougal Wilson – AT&T's "Train"

=== Frank Capra Achievement Award ===
- Duncan Henderson

=== Franklin J. Schaffner Achievement Award ===
- Arthur Lewis
