= The Iron Throne (Game of Thrones) =

- Game of Thrones episode
- Episode no.: Season 8 Episode 6
- Directed by: David Benioff; D. B. Weiss
- Written by: David Benioff; D. B. Weiss
- Cinematography by: Jonathan Freeman
- Editing by: Katie Weiland
- Original air date: May 19, 2019
- Running time: 78 minutes

Guest appearances
- Gemma Whelan as Yara Greyjoy; Tobias Menzies as Edmure Tully; Daniel Portman as Podrick Payne; Rupert Vansittart as Yohn Royce; Lino Facioli as Robin Arryn; Richard Rycroft as Maester Wolkan; Gabriel Akuwudike as an Unsullied captain; Noel Harron as an Ironborn lord; Toby Osmond as the Prince of Dorne; Andrew Bicknell as a Riverlands lord; Michael Benbaruk as Lord Une; Frank Jakeman as a Vale lord; Niall Bishop as a Northern lord

Episode chronology
| ← Previous "The Bells" | Next → — |
- Game of Thrones season 8

"The Iron Throne" is the series finale of the HBO medieval fantasy television series Game of Thrones. It is the sixth episode of the eighth season and the 73rd overall. Written and directed by executive producers and series creators David Benioff and D. B. Weiss, the episode first aired on May 19, 2019.

In the episode, the characters deal with the aftermath of Daenerys Targaryen's (Emilia Clarke) devastation of King's Landing and determine who will finally rule Westeros.

The episode received mixed reviews from critics and viewers for its story arcs, pacing, and tone, although the acting, music, and visuals were praised. Benioff and Weiss received directing and writing nominations for the episode at the 71st Primetime Emmy Awards, whilst Kit Harington and Peter Dinklage selected the episode to support their nominations for Outstanding Lead Actor in a Drama Series and Outstanding Supporting Actor in a Drama Series, respectively. Dinklage won in his category.

== Plot ==
Jon and Davos survey the destruction that Daenerys brought on King's Landing. Tyrion finds the corpses of Cersei and Jaime in the ruins of the Red Keep. Grey Worm and the Unsullied began executing captured Lannister soldiers; Jon attempts to intervene, but Grey Worm insists he is acting on Daenerys' orders. Daenerys declares to the Unsullied and Dothraki that they "liberated" the people of King's Landing, and she will soon "liberate" the entire world. Tyrion publicly resigns as Daenerys' Hand in protest, and she has him arrested for treason.

Jon encounters Arya, who warns him that Daenerys will see him as a threat to her rule as she knows his true identity. Jon visits Tyrion in captivity and they discuss Daenerys' actions. Jon tells Tyrion that while he cannot justify what Daenerys did, it was the losses of Missandei and Rhaegal that drove her to do it. Tyrion tells Jon that despite the love they both have for Daenerys, it is Jon's duty to kill her for being the people's greatest threat, and also warns Jon that Arya and Sansa will not bend the knee to Daenerys, putting all of House Stark in danger.

Jon confronts Daenerys in the destroyed throne room. Daenerys blames Cersei for the deaths of the civilians and refuses to forgive Tyrion or the Lannister prisoners, arguing that their executions – and a continued "liberation" campaign – are necessary to establish her vision of a good world. Unable to dissuade Daenerys, a conflicted Jon fatally stabs her as they kiss. As Jon grieves, Drogon arrives and discovers that Daenerys has been murdered; an anguished Drogon ultimately melts the Iron Throne before carrying her body away to the east.

Weeks later, the lords and ladies of the Seven Kingdoms convene at the Dragonpit to discuss the fates of Tyrion and Jon, now imprisoned by the Unsullied. Tyrion suggests that future monarchs be chosen by a council of lords and ladies, instead of inheriting the crown, while also saying that this was Daenerys' original intention before she succumbed to madness. The council agrees and elects Bran as the new king of the Seven Kingdoms. Sansa requests the North's independence from the Seven Kingdoms, which Bran accepts. Bran appoints Tyrion as his Hand so that Tyrion can make amends for his various wrongs, and sentences Jon to rejoin the Night's Watch for life to appease Grey Worm. Grey Worm and the Unsullied then depart for Missandei's homeland of Naath.

A short time later, Tyrion convenes a new Small Council consisting of Bronn, Brienne, Davos, and Sam. As they begin planning to rebuild King's Landing, Bran, attended by a newly knighted Podrick Payne, briefly meets with the council before departing whilst enquiring the whereabouts of Drogon. Brienne, in her duties as Lord Commander, completes Jaime's entry in the Book of Brothers, expanding his accomplishments. Sam works on completing a book begun by a previous maester after the death of King Robert Baratheon. The book will document everything that has happened over the previous few years, and is titled A Song of Ice and Fire.

Arya decides to explore the uncharted Sunset Sea west of Westeros. Sansa returns to Winterfell and is crowned Queen in the North. Jon returns to Castle Black and reunites with Tormund, his direwolf Ghost, and the rest of the wildlings. Jon leads them to return to the lands beyond the Wall, as the millennia-long winter in that region finally begins to thaw.

== Production ==
=== Writing ===
The episode was written by David Benioff and D. B. Weiss. It contains original content not found in George R. R. Martin's novels, but also contains content planned for future novels: Isaac Hempstead Wright stated that Benioff and Weiss told him Bran becoming king was an idea presented to them directly from Martin.

=== Filming ===
The episode was directed by David Benioff and D. B. Weiss.

During filming of the Dragonpit scene in Seville, Spain, actors Vladimir Furdik (The Night King), Faye Marsay (The Waif), Tom Wlaschiha (Jaqen H'ghar), and Kit Harington (Jon Snow) were brought by HBO to the city as decoys to hide plot points. In the same scene, two plastic water bottles were spotted by the audience behind John Bradley and Liam Cunningham's feet.

It is the only episode of the season that does not feature the "Game Revealed" and "Inside the Episode" behind-the-scenes specials, which were recorded, yet unreleased for unknown reasons, and were instead reworked as a featurette on the making of the episode, titled "Duty is the Death of Love", which was included with the home media release of Season 8.

== Reception ==
=== Ratings ===
The episode was viewed by 13.61 million viewers on its initial live broadcast on HBO, making it the most watched episode of the series, surpassing the preceding episode "The Bells", as well as the most-watched HBO telecast ever, surpassing the 13.4 million viewers of The Sopranos episode "For All Debts Public and Private". An additional 5.7 million viewers watched on streaming platforms, for a total of 19.3 million viewers.

In the United Kingdom, the episode was watched by 5.12 million on Sky Atlantic, according to the British Audience Research Board.

=== Critical response ===
On the review aggregator website Rotten Tomatoes, 47% of 136 critics' reviews are positive, with an average rating of 6.3/10. The website's consensus reads: "If nothing else, 'The Iron Throne' is a bittersweet – if unfortunately bland – series finale that ensures Game of Thrones fans will linger on the fate of their favorite characters for some time. Will they ever be satisfied by the show's conclusions? Ask us again in 10 years." It is the lowest-rated episode of the series on the website.

James Poniewozik of The New York Times felt the story insufficiently explained why Daenerys burned King's Landing and how she arrived at her final character point, stating that "a woman, abused and traded like chattel, becomes so caught up in her zeal to do good that she sees anything but blind adoration as evil" was a solid idea, but that viewers were not taken "inside her perspective to make that change seem real and inevitable." Poniewozik said "small character moments" like Tyrion straightening chairs, Arya sailing west and Jon rejoining the Wildlings "made emotional sense". Hank Stuever of The Washington Post, who watched with lowered expectations, said the series "sailed (and trotted) off to a noble and perhaps anticlimactic end...It was everything nobody wanted, but it was still quite a thing: adequately just, narratively symmetrical and sufficiently poignant. It went long on swelling imagery and somewhat short on dialogue." Laura Prudom of IGN wrote that the finale was "not a disaster", but also "not quite the dream of spring we might've hoped for", "struggling to resolve many of the show's lingering plot threads in a satisfying and coherent conclusion, and once again falling victim to the season's needlessly truncated episode order."

Some critics took issue with the episode's pacing and final revelations. Spencer Kornhaber of The Atlantic wrote that the finale was "tonally odd, logically strained, and emotionally thin" and a "drama turned into a sitcom". Lenika Cruz, also writing for The Atlantic, wrote that the episode had "pacing issues, rushed character development, tonal dissonance, the lack of attention to detail, unexplained reversals, and weak dialogue". Kelly Lawler of USA Today wrote, "Tragedy and injustice were as baked into the series' identity as dragons and battles," but the finale was "unrecognizable. It was hacky; it was clichéd. Every character left standing received a saccharine coda...It didn't gracefully swerve into another lane, it careened off a cliff." Inkoo Kang of Slate wrote that "We know governance is complicated, and the show’s depiction of those complications is one of the reasons why it initially felt so refreshingly relatable – but the finale’s argument that an abdication of responsibility is the best we can hope for in a leader – feels lazy and false."

Conversely, TV Guide's consensus concluded that the Game of Thrones finale "finished strong," ranking it #33 on the list of all 73 episodes. Richard Roeper, writing for the Chicago Sun-Times, wrote that "over all, the finale was a solid and largely satisfying wrap-up to one of the most exciting and enthralling TV series ever," and was "melancholy, bittersweet, twist-filled and at times surprisingly humorous." Hugh Montgomery of BBC also rated the episode 4/5, writing that the finale largely satisfies "on the terms the creators have [previously] set out" in the "ruinous" penultimate episode. Bran becoming king was "true to the show’s sense of realpolitik" as a "contingently happy ending", whereas the show "provides an efficient, if disappointingly uncontroversial, ending" for Jon, Arya and Sansa. Karl Quinn of The Age wrote that the show "may have resolved itself" too quickly in dramatic terms, but Bran's ascension "made perfect sense" thematically according to the show's "anti-war and anti-despot themes...After all the bloodshed, butchery and burning, Game of Thrones ended not with a bang but with a ballot." Lucy Mangan of The Guardian gave a 4/5 rating, stating that "the finale just about delivered. It was true to the series' overall subject – war, and the pity of war – and, after doing a lot of wrong to several protagonists last week, did right by those left standing."

=== Awards and nominations ===
| Year | Award | Category | Nominee(s) | Result | Ref. |
|---|---|---|---|---|---|
| 2019 | Hollywood Professional Association Awards | Outstanding Editing – Episodic or Non-Theatrical Feature (Over 30 Minutes) | Katie Weiland | Nominated | |
| 2019 | Primetime Emmy Awards | Outstanding Directing for a Drama Series | David Benioff and D. B. Weiss | Nominated | |
| 2019 | Primetime Emmy Awards | Outstanding Lead Actor in a Drama Series | Kit Harington | Nominated | |
| 2019 | Primetime Emmy Awards | Outstanding Supporting Actor in a Drama Series | Peter Dinklage | Won | |
| 2019 | Primetime Emmy Awards | Outstanding Writing for a Drama Series | David Benioff and D. B. Weiss | Nominated | |
| 2019 | Primetime Creative Arts Emmy Awards | Outstanding Cinematography for a Single-Camera Series (One Hour) | Jonathan Freeman | Nominated | |
| 2019 | Primetime Creative Arts Emmy Awards | Outstanding Single-Camera Picture Editing for a Drama Series | Katie Weiland | Nominated | |
| 2020 | Costume Designers Guild Awards | Excellence in Sci-Fi/Fantasy Television | Michele Clapton | Won | |
| 2020 | Visual Effects Society Awards | Outstanding Created Environment in an Episode, Commercial, or Real-Time Project | Carlos Patrick De Leon, Alonso Bocanegra, Marcela A. Silva, and Benjamin Ross (for Red Keep Plaza) | Won | |
