= 18th Visual Effects Society Awards =

2020 awards ceremony for 2019 works

18th Visual Effects Society Awards

January 29, 2020

Outstanding Visual Effects in a Photoreal Feature:
The Lion King

Outstanding Visual Effects in a Photoreal Episode:
The Mandalorian – "Chapter 2: The Child"

The 18th Visual Effects Society Awards was an awards ceremony held by the Visual Effects Society. Nominations were announced on January 7, 2020, and the ceremony took place on January 29, 2020.

== Nominees ==
=== Honorary Awards ===
Lifetime Achievement Award:

- Martin Scorsese

VES Visionary Award:

- Roland Emmerich

VES Award for Creative Excellence

- Sheena Duggal

=== Film ===
Outstanding Visual Effects in a Photoreal Feature	Outstanding Supporting Visual Effects in a Photoreal Feature
The Lion King – Robert Legato, Tom Peitzman, Adam Valdez, Andrew R. Jones: Alita: Battle Angel – Richard Hollander, Kevin Sherwood, Eric Saindon, Richard Baneham, Bob Trevino; Avengers: Endgame – Dan DeLeeuw, Jen Underdahl, Russell Earl, Matt Aitken, Dan Sudick; Gemini Man – Bill Westenhofer, Karen Murphy-Mundell, Guy Williams, Sheldon Stopsack, Mark Hawker; Star Wars: The Rise of Skywalker – Roger Guyett, Stacy Bissell, Patrick Tubach, Neal Scanlan, Dominic Tuohy	The Irishman – Pablo Helman, Mitchell Ferm, Jill Brooks, Leandro Estebecorena, Jeff Brink: 1917 – Guillaume Rocheron, Sona Pak, Greg Butler, Vijay Selvam, Dominic Tuohy; Ford v Ferrari – Olivier Dumont, Kathy Siegel, Dave Morley, Malte Sarnes, Mark Byers; Joker – Edwin Rivera, Brice Parker, Mathew Giampa, Bryan Godwin, Jeff Brink; The Aeronauts – Louis Morin, Annie Godin, Christian Kaestner, Ara Khanikian, Mike Dawson
Outstanding Visual Effects in an Animated Feature	Outstanding Animated Character in a Photoreal Feature
Missing Link – Brad Schiff, Travis Knight, Steve Emerson, Benoit Dubuc: Frozen 2 – Steve Goldberg, Peter Del Vecho, Mark Hammel, Michael Giaimo; Klaus – Sergio Pablos, Matthew Teevan, Marcin Jakubowski and Szymon Biernacki; The Lego Movie 2: The Second Part – David Burgess, Tim Smith, Mark Theriault and John Rix; Toy Story 4 – Josh Cooley, Mark Nielsen, Bob Moyer and Gary Bruins	Alita: Battle Angel – Alita – Michael Cozens, Mark Haenga, Olivier Lesaint, Dejan Momcliovic: Avengers: Endgame – Smart Hulk – Kevin Martel, Ebrahim Jahromi, Sven Jensen, Rober Allman; Gemini Man – Junior – Paul Story, Stuart Adcock, Emiliano Padovani, Marco Revelant; The Lion King – Scar – Gabriel Arnold, James Hood, Julia Friedl, Daniel Fortheringham
Outstanding Animated Character in an Animated Feature	Outstanding Created Environment in a Photoreal Feature
Missing Link – Susan – Rachelle Lambden, Brenda Baumgarten, Morgan Hay, Benoit Dubuc: Frozen 2 – The Water Nøkk – Svetla Radivoeva, Marc Bryant, Richard E. Lehmann, Cameron Black; Klaus – Jesper – Yoshimishi Tamura, Alfredo Cassano, Maxime Delalande, Jason Schwartzman; Toy Story 4 – Bo Peep – Radford Hurn, Tanja Krampfert, George Nguyen and Becki Rocha Tower	The Lion King – The Pridelands – Marco Rolandi, Luca Bonatti, Jules Bodenstein, Filippo Preti: Aladdin – Agrabah – Daniel Schmid, Falk Boje, Stanislaw Marek, Kevin George; Alita: Battle Angel – Iron City – John Stevenson-Galvin, Ryan Arcus, Mathias Larserud, Mark Tait; Motherless Brooklyn – Penn Station – John Bair, Vance Miller, Sebastian Romero, Steve Sullivan; Star Wars: The Rise of Skywalker –Pasaana Desert – Daniele Bigi, Steve Hardy, John Seru, Steven Denyer
Outstanding Created Environment in an Animated Feature	Outstanding Virtual Cinematography in a Photoreal Project
Toy Story 4 – Antiques Mall – Hosuk Chang, Andrew Finley, Alison Leaf, Philip Shoebottom for Antique Mall: Frozen 2 – Giants' Gorge – Samy Segura, Jay V. Jackson, Justin Cram, Scott Townsend; How to Train Your Dragon: The Hidden World – The Hidden World – Chris Grun, Ronnie Cleland, Ariel Chisholm, Philippe Brochu; Missing Link – Passage to India Jungle – Oliver Jones, Phil Brotherton, Nick Mariana, Ralph Procida	The Lion King –Robert Legato, Caleb Deschanel, Ben Grossman, AJ Sciutto: Alita: Battle Angel – Emile Ghorayeb, Simon Jung, Nick Epstein, Mike Perry; The Mandalorian – "Chapter 6: The Prisoner", The Roost – Richard Bluff, Jason Porter, Landis Fields IV, Baz Idione; Toy Story 4 – Jean-Claude Kalache, Patrick Lin
Outstanding Model in a Photoreal or Animated Project	Outstanding Effects Simulations in a Photoreal Feature
The Mandalorian – "Chapter 3: The Sin"; The Razorcrest – Doug Chiang, Jay Machado, John Goodson, Landis Fields IV: Lost in Space – The Resolute – Xuan Prada, Jason Martin, Jonathan Vårdstedt, Eric Andersson; Missing Link – The Manchuria – Todd Alan Harvey, Dan Casey, Katy Hughes; The Man in the High Castle – Rocket Train – Neil Taylor, Casi Blume, Ben McDougal, Chris Kuhn	Star Wars: The Rise of Skywalker – Don Wong, Thibault Gauriau, Goncalo Cabaca, Francois-Maxence Desplanques: Dumbo – Bubble Elephants – Sam Hancock, Victor Glushchenko, Andrew Savchenko, Arthur Moody; Spider-Man: Far From Home – Molten Man – Adam Gailey, Jacob Santamaria, Jacob Clark, Stephanie Molk; The Lion King – David Schneider, Samantha Hiscock, Andy Feery, Kostas Strevlos
Outstanding Effects Simulations in an Animated Feature	Outstanding Compositing in a Photoreal Feature
Frozen 2 – Erin V. Ramos, Scott Townsend, Thomas Wickes, Rattanin Sirinaruemarn: Abominable – Alex Timchenko, Domin Lee, Michael Losure, Eric Warren; How to Train Your Dragon: The Hidden World – Water and Waterfalls – Derek Cheung, Baptiste Van Opastal, Youxi Woo, Jason Mayer; Toy Story 4 – Alexis Angelidis, Amit Baadkar, Lyon Liew and Michael Lorenzen	The Irishman – Nelson Sepulveda, Vince Papaix, Benjamin O'Brien, Christopher Doerhoff: Alita: Battle Angel –Adam Bradley, Carlo Scaduto, Hirofumi Takeda, Ben Roberts; Avengers: Endgame – Tim Walker, Blake Winder, Tobias Wiesner, Joerg Bruemmer; Captain Marvel - Young Nick Fury – Trent Claus, David Moreno Hernandez, Jeremiah Sweeney, Yuki Uehara; Star Wars: The Rise of Skywalker – Jeff Sutherland, John Galloway, Sam Bassett, Charles Lai
Outstanding Special (Practical) Effects in a Photoreal or Animated Project	
The Dark Crystal: Age of Resistance – She Knows All the Secrets – Sean Mathiesen, Jon Savage, Toby Froud, Phil Harvey: Aladdin – Magic Carpet – Mark Holt, Jay Mallet, Will Wyatt, Dickon Mitchell; Game of Thrones - The Bells – Sam Conway, Terry Palmer, Laurence Harvey, Alastair Vardy; Terminator: Dark Fate – Neil Corbould, David Brighton, Ray Ferguson, Keith Dawson	

=== Television ===
Outstanding Visual Effects in a Photoreal Episode	Outstanding Supporting Visual Effects in a Photoreal Episode
The Mandalorian – "Chapter 2: The Child" – Richard Bluff, Abbigail Keller, Jason Porter, Hayden Jones, Roy Cancinon (for "The Child"): Game of Thrones – "The Bells" – Joe Bauer, Steve Kullback, Ted Rae, Mohsen Mousavi, Sam Conway; His Dark Materials – "The Fight to the Death" – Russell Dodgson, James, Whitlam, Shawn Hillier, Robert Harrington; Lady and the Tramp – Robert Weaver, Christopher Raimo, Arslan Elver, Michael Cozens, Bruno Van Zeebroeck; Lost in Space – "Ninety-Seven" – Jabbar Raisani, Terron Pratt, Niklas Jacobson, Juri Stanossek, Paul Benjamin; Stranger Things – "Chapter Six: E Pluribus Unum" – Paul Graff, Tom Ford, Michael Maher Jr., Martin Pelletier, Andy Sowers	Chernobyl – "1:23:45" – Max Dennison, Lindsay McFarlane, Clare Cheetham, Paul Jones, Claudius Christian Rauch: Living with Yourself – "Nice Knowing You" – Jay Worth, Jacqueline VandenBussche, Chris Wright, Tistan Zerafa; See – "Godflame" – Adrian de Wet, Eve Fizzinoglia, Matthew Welford, Pedro Sabrosa, Tom Blacklock; The Crown – "Aberfan" – Ben Turner, Reece Ewing, David Fleet, Jonathan Wood; Vikings – "What Happens in the Cave" – Dominic Remane, Mike Borrett, Ovidiu Cinazan, Tom Morrison, Paul Byrne
Outstanding Visual Effects in a Commercial	Outstanding Animated Character in an Episode or Real-Time Project
Hennessy – The Seven Worlds – Carsten Keller, Selcuk Ergen, Kiril Mirkov, William Laban: Anthem – Conviction – Vikto Muller, Lenka Likarova, Chris Harvey, Petr Marek; BMW – Legend – Michael Gregory, Christian Downes, Tim Kafka, Toya Drechsler; PlayStation – Feel the Power of Pro – Sam Driscoll, Clare Melia, Gary Driver, Stefan Susemihl; Purdey's – Hummingbird – Jules Janaud, Emma Cook, Matthew Thomas, Philip Child	Stranger Things – Tom/Bruce Monster – Joseph Dubé-Arsenault, Antoine Barthod, Frederick Gagnon, Xavier Lafarge: Lady and the Tramp – Tramp – Thiago Martins, Arslan Elver, Stanislas Paillereau, Martine Chartrand; The Mandalorian – The Child; Mudhorn – Terry Bannon, Rudy Massar, Hugo Leygnac; The Umbrella Academy – Pilot; Pogo – Aidan Martin, Craig Young, Olivier Beierlein, Laurent Herveic
Outstanding Animated Character in a Commercial	Outstanding Created Environment in an Episode, Commercial, or Real-Time Project
Cyberpunk 2077 – Dex – Jonas Ekman, Jonas Skoog, Marek Madej, Grzegorz Chonjnacki: Apex Legends - Meltdown; Mirage – Chris Bayol, John Fielding, Derrick Sesson, Nole Murphy; Churchill – Churchie – Martino Madeddu, Philippe Moine, Clement Granjon, Jon Wood; John Lewis – Excitable Edgar; Edgar – Tim van Hussen, Diarmid Harrison-Murray, Amir Bazzazi, Michael Diprose	Game of Thrones – The Iron Throne; Red Keep Plaza – Carlos Patrick DeLeon, Alonso Bocanegra Martinez, Marcela Silva, Benjamin Ross: Lost in Space – Precipice; The Trench – Philip Engström, Benjamion Bernon, Martin Bergquist, Xuan Prada; The Dark Crystal: Age of Resistance – The Endless Forest – Sulé Bryan, Charles Chorein, Christian Waite, Martyn Hawkins; The Mandalorian – Nevarro Town – Alex Murtaza, Yanick Gaudreau, Marco Tremblay, Maryse Bouchard
Outstanding Effects Simulations in an Episode, Commercial, or Real-Time Project	Outstanding Compositing in an Episode
Game of Thrones – "The Bells" – Marcel Kern, Paul Fuller, Ryo Sakaguchi, Thomas Hartmann: Hennessy – "The Seven Worlds" – Selcuk Ergen, Radu Ciubotariu, Andrew Lucio, Vincent Ullmann; Lost in Space – "Precipice; Water Planet" – Juri Bryan, Hugo Medda, Kristian Olsson, John Perrigo; Stranger Things – "Melting Tom/Bruce" – Nathan Arbuckle, Christian Gaumond, James Dong, Aleksander Starkov; The Mandalorian – "Chapter 2: The Child"; Mudhorn – Xavier Martin Ramirez, Ian Baxter, Fabio Siino, Andrea Rosa	Game of Thrones – "The Long Night"; Dragon Ground Battle – Mark Richardson, Darren Christie, Nathan Abbott, Owen Longstaff: Game of Thrones – "The Bells" – Sean Heuston, Scott Joseph, James Elster, Corinne Teo; Stranger Things – "Starcourt Mall Battle" – Simon Lehembre, Andrew Kowbell, Karim El-Masry, Miklos Mesterhazy; Watchmen – "It's Summer and We're Running Out of Ice"; Looking Glass – Nathaniel Larouche, Iyi Tubi, Perunika Yorgova, Mitchell Beaton
Outstanding Compositing in a Photoreal Commercial	
Hennessy – The Seven Worlds – Rod Norman, Guillaume Weiss, Alexander Kulikov, Alessandro Granella: BMW – Legend – Toya Drechsler, Vivek Tekale, Guillaume Weiss, Alexander Kulikov; Feeding America – I Am Hunger in America – Dan Giraldo, Marcelo Pasqualino, Alexander Koester; PlayStation – Feel the Power of Pro – Gary Driver, Stefan Susemihl, Greg Spencer, Theajo Dharan	

=== Other categories ===
Outstanding Visual Effects in a Real-Time Project	Outstanding Visual Effects in a Special Venue Project
Control – Janne Pulkkinen, Elmeri Raitanen, Matti Hämäläinen, James Tottman: Call of Duty Modern Warfare – Charles Chabert, Chris Parise, Attila Zalanyi, Patrick Hagar; Gears 5 – Aryan Hanbeck, Laura Kippax, Greg Mitchell, Stu Maxwell; Myth: A Frozen Tale – Jeff Gipson, Nicholas Russell, Brittney Lee, Jose Luis Gomez Diaz; Vader Immortal: Episode I – Ben Snow, Mike Doran, Aaron McBride, Steve Henricks	Star Wars: Rise of the Resistance – Jason Bayever, Patrick Kearney, Carol Norton, Bill George: Avengers: Damage Control – Michael Koperwas, Shereif Fattouh, Ian Bowie, Kishore Vijay, Curtis Hickman; Jurassic World: The Ride – Hayden Landis, Friend Wells, Heath Kraynak, Ellen Coss; Millennium Falcon – Smugglers Run – Asa Kalama, Rob Huebner, Khatsho Orfali, Susan Greenhow; Universal Sphere – James Healy, Morgan MacCuish, Ben West, Charlie Bayliss
Outstanding Visual Effects in a Student Project	
The Beauty – Marc Angele, Aleksandra Todorovic, Pascal Schelbli, Noel Winzen: Downfall – Matias Heker, Stephen Moroz, Bradley Cocksedge; Love and Fifty Megatons – Denis Krez, Josephine Roß, Paulo Scatena, Lukas Löffler; Oeil Pour Oeil – Alan Guimont, Thomas Boileau, Malcolm Hunt, Robin Courtoise	

== Most nominations ==
Nominations	Films/Programs
6	Game of Thrones
6	The Mandalorian
5	Alita: Battle Angel
5	The Lion King
5	Toy Story 4
4	Frozen II
4	Lost in Space
4	Star Wars: The Rise of Skywalker
4	Stranger Things
3	Avengers: Endgame
3	Hennessy – The Seven Worlds
3	Missing Link
