= Miguel Sapochnik =

English film and television director (born 1974)

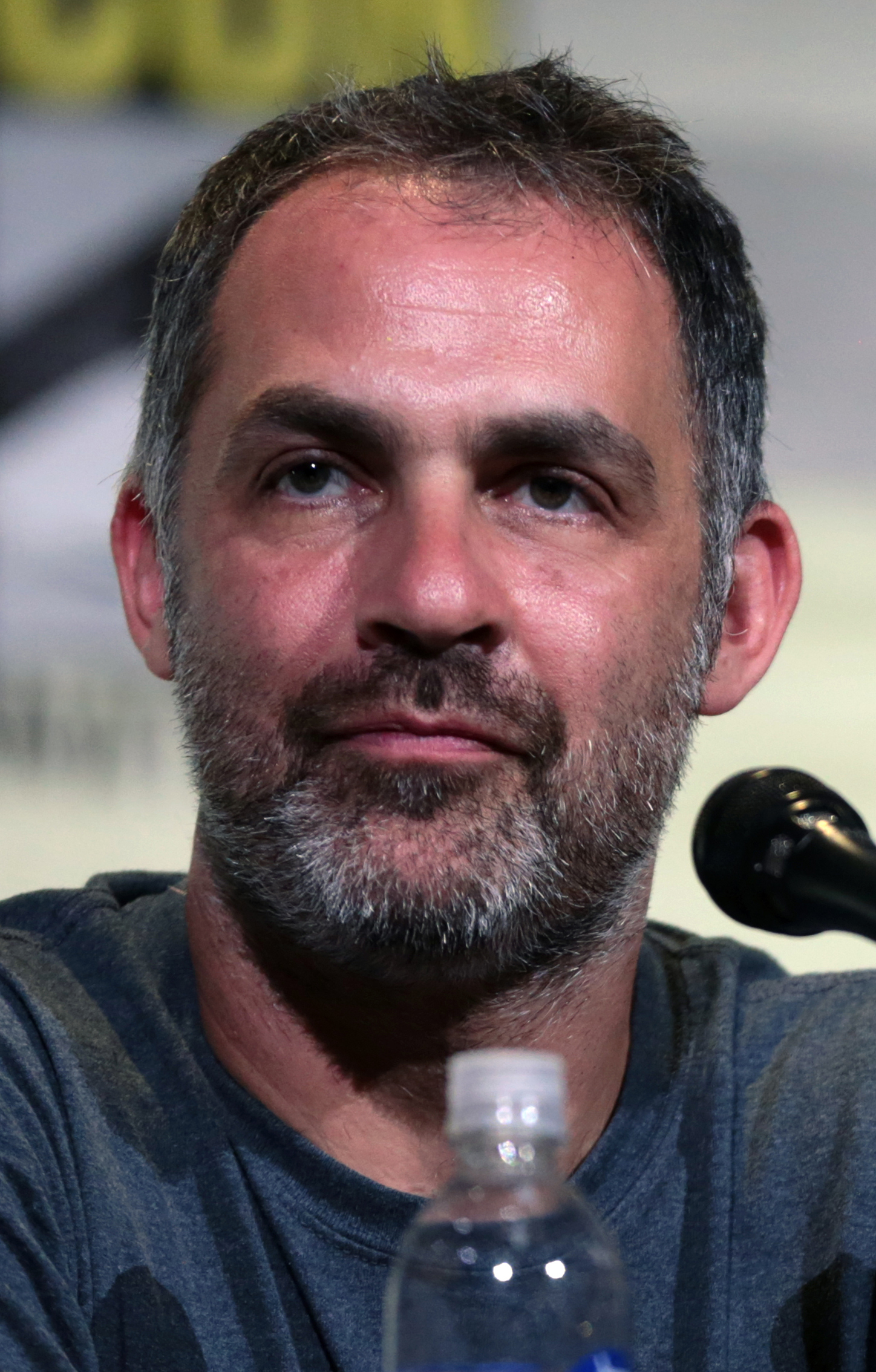
- Miguel Sapochnik at San Diego Comic-Con in 2016.
- Born: Miguel Vicente Rosenberg-Sapochnik; 1 July 1974 (age 52); Hammersmith, London, England
- Other name: Miguel Rosenberg
- Occupations: Film director; Television director; Storyboard artist
- Years active: 1996–present
- Spouse: Alexis Raben (m. 2006)

Miguel Sapochnik (born 1 July 1974) is an English-Argentine film and television director and former storyboard artist. For his work as a director on the HBO epic fantasy series Game of Thrones, he won the award for Outstanding Directing for a Drama Series at the 68th Primetime Emmy Awards and Directors Guild of America Award for Outstanding Directing – Drama Series at the 69th Directors Guild of America Awards. Sapochnik also directed the science fiction films Repo Men (2010) and Finch (2021).

== Career ==
Born as Miguel Vicente Rosenberg-Sapochnik in London, England, Sapochnik began his career as a storyboard artist; some of his credits include Trainspotting (1996, directed by Danny Boyle) and The Winter Guest (1997, actor Alan Rickman's directorial debut).

In 2000, Sapochnik directed a 2000 short film titled The Dreamer, which he also wrote. He also directed the "Beautiful Inside" music video for singer Louise.

Between 2001 and 2005, he was a director of Snowflake in Hell Films Limited, a film and video production company in London.

Sapochnik's feature film directorial debut was Repo Men (2010), starring Jude Law and Forest Whitaker.

Sapochnik has since then worked mainly on American television and streaming series, directing episodes of Awake (2012), Fringe (2011–12), House (2011–12) and Mind Games (2014).

In 2015, Sapochnik directed two episodes of Game of Thrones for the show's fifth season, "The Gift" and "Hardhome." In 2016, he returned to direct the final two episodes of Game of Thrones' sixth season, "Battle of the Bastards" and "The Winds of Winter". All of these episodes received acclaim from both critics and viewers. Sapochnik won the Primetime Emmy Award for Outstanding Directing for a Drama Series at the 68th Primetime Emmy Awards, for directing "Battle of the Bastards".

In 2016, Sapochnik directed the series premiere of the show Altered Carbon for Netflix.

In 2017, he directed an episode of Iron Fist.

In April 2019, he directed the third ("The Long Night") and fifth ("The Bells") episodes of the final season of Game of Thrones. For the former, he was nominated once again for the “Emmy Award for Outstanding Directing for a Drama Series”.

In 2022, he was co-showrunner of House of the Dragon, a prequel to Game of Thrones. He directed the series premiere "The Heirs of The Dragon" as well as "The Princess and the Queen" and "Driftmark". The first season premiered on August 21, 2022. In August 2022, it was announced that he would be stepping down as showrunner after the first season, though he will remain as an executive producer for future seasons.

In 2025 it was announced that he would be joining the second season of 3 Body Problem.

== Personal life ==
Sapochnik is of Argentine origin, and has been married to actress Alexis Raben since 2006.

He is Jewish.

== Filmography ==
Film

| Year | Title | Director | Executive producer |
|---|---|---|---|
| 2010 | Repo Men | Yes | Yes |
| 2021 | Finch | Yes | Yes |

Television

| Year | Show | Notes |
|---|---|---|
| 2011–2012 | House | Directed 5 episodes |
| 2011–2013 | Fringe | Directed 2 episodes |
| 2012 | Awake | Director: "Turtles All the Way Down" |
| 2012 | Falling Skies | Director: "Young Bloods" |
| 2013 | Under the Dome | Director: "Imperfect Circles" |
| 2013 | Revolution | Director: "Ghosts" |
| 2013 | Banshee | Directed 2 episodes |
| 2014 | Mind Games | Director: "Pilot" |
| 2014 | Extant | Director: "Ascension" |
| 2015–2019 | Game of Thrones | Directed 6 episodes |
| 2015 | Masters of Sex | Director: "The Excitement of Release" |
| 2015 | True Detective | Director: "Church in Ruins" |
| 2017 | Iron Fist | Director: "Eight Diagram Dragon Palm" |
| 2018 | Altered Carbon | Director: "Out of the Past" |
| 2022 | House of the Dragon | Directed 3 episodes; also showrunner and executive producer |

== Awards and nominations ==
| Year | Title | Episode | Award/nomination |
|---|---|---|---|
| 2016 | Game of Thrones | "Battle of the Bastards" | Primetime Emmy Award for Outstanding Directing for a Drama Series; Directors Guild of America Award for Outstanding Directing – Drama Series; Nominated—Hugo Award for Best Dramatic Presentation, Short Form |
| 2019 | Game of Thrones | "The Long Night" | Nominated—Primetime Emmy Award for Outstanding Directing for a Drama Series; Nominated—Directors Guild of America Award for Outstanding Directing – Drama Series |
| 2022 | House of the Dragon | N/A | Nominated—Primetime Emmy Award for Outstanding Drama Series |
