= Onnalee Blank =

American sound engineer

- Occupation: Sound engineer
- Years active: 2004–present

Onnalee Blank is an American sound engineer. She has won five Primetime Emmy Awards and has been nominated for five more in the categories Outstanding Sound Mixing and Outstanding Sound Editing.
