= Primetime Emmy Award for Outstanding Picture Editing for a Drama Series =

Primetime Emmy Award for Picture Editing for a Drama Series
- Awarded for: Outstanding Picture Editing for a Drama Series
- Country: United States
- Presented by: Academy of Television Arts & Sciences
- Currently held by: Pluribus (2026)
- Website: emmys.com

This is a list of winners and nominees of the Primetime Emmy Award for Outstanding Picture Editing for a Drama Series. This award and Outstanding Picture Editing for a Comedy Series replaced Outstanding Single-Camera Picture Editing for a Series in 2002.

As of 2015, 24 and Breaking Bad are the only shows to have won this award four times.

In the following list, the first titles listed in gold and bold are the winners; those not in gold are nominees, which are listed in alphabetical order. The years given are those in which the ceremonies took place:

== Winners and nominations ==
=== 1960s ===
Outstanding Individual Achievement in Film Editing

Year	Program	Episode	Nominee(s)	Network
1964 (16th)
1964 (16th)	The Making of the President 1960		William T. Cartwright	ABC
1964 (16th)	Arrest and Trial		Danny Landres, Milton Shifman and Richard Wray	ABC
1964 (16th)	Greece: The Golden Age		Constantine S. Gochis	NBC
1964 (16th)	The Kremlin		Aram Boyajian	NBC
1964 (16th)	Saga of Western Man		James Algie, Samuel Cohen, Hans Dudelheim, Walter Essenfeld, Alexander Hamilton, Edward Lempa, Walter Moran, Nils Rasmussen, John Roberts, Robert Sandbo and Edward Shea	ABC
1965 (17th)
1965 (17th)	The Man from U.N.C.L.E.		Henry Berman, Joseph Dervin and William Gulick	NBC
1966 (18th)
1966 (18th)	Bonanza		Marvin Coil, Everett Douglas and Ellsworth Hoagland	CBS
1966 (18th)	The Making of the President 1964		David Blewitt and William T. Cartwright	CBS
1966 (18th)	The Man from U.N.C.L.E.		Henry Berman, Joseph Dervin and William Gulick	NBC
1966 (18th)	Michelangelo: The Last Giant		Loftus McDonough	NBC
1966 (18th)	Voyage to the Bottom of the Sea		James Baiotto, Robert Belcher and Richard Wormell	ABC
1967 (19th)
1967 (19th)	Mission: Impossible		Paul Krasny and Robert Watts	CBS
1968 (20th)
1968 (20th)	The Bell Telephone Hour	"The Sounds and Sights of Chicago"	Peter Johnson	NBC
1968 (20th)	Chrysler Presents The Bob Hope Show		Richard Brockway, Donn Cambern and John C. Fuller	NBC
1968 (20th)	Mission: Impossible	"The Photographer"	David Wages	CBS
1968 (20th)	Mission: Impossible	"The Traitor"	Robert Watts	CBS
1968 (20th)	NBC Experiment in Television	"Four Days in Omaha"	Peter V. Punzi	NBC
1968 (20th)	Star Trek	"The Doomsday Machine"	Donald R. Rode	NBC
1969 (21st)
1969 (21st)	Judd, for the Defense	"An Elephant in a Cigar Box"	Bill Mosher	ABC
1969 (21st)	Chrysler Presents The Bob Hope Christmas Special		John C. Fuller, Igo Kantor, Patrick Kennedy and Frank McKelvey	NBC
1969 (21st)	Star Trek	"Assignment: Earth"	Donald R. Rode	NBC
1969 (21st)	Teacher, Teacher (Hallmark Hall of Fame)		Sidney Katz	NBC

=== 1970s ===
Outstanding Film Editing for a Series

Year	Program	Episode	Nominee(s)	Network
1970 (22nd)
1970 (22nd)	Bracken's World	"Sweet Smell of Failure"	Bill Mosher	NBC
1970 (22nd)	The Ghost & Mrs. Muir	"The Great Power Failure"	Axel R. Hubert	ABC
1970 (22nd)	Mission: Impossible		Arthur David Hilton	CBS
1971 (23rd)
1971 (23rd)	The Bold Ones: The Senator	"A Continual Roar of Musketry"	Michael Economou	NBC
1971 (23rd)	The Bold Ones: The Senator	"To Taste of Death But Once"	Douglas Stewart	NBC
1971 (23rd)	Hawaii Five-O		Arthur David Hilton	CBS
1972 (24th)
1972 (24th)	Columbo	"Death Lends a Hand"	Edward M. Abroms	NBC
1972 (24th)	The Bold Ones: The Lawyers		Richard Bracken, Gloryette Clark and J. Terry Williams	NBC
1972 (24th)	Longstreet		Joseph Dervin	ABC
1973 (25th)
1973 (25th)	The Waltons		Gene Fowler, Marjorie Fowler and Anthony Wollner	CBS
1973 (25th)	M*A*S*H		Fred W. Berger and Stanford Tischler	CBS
1973 (25th)	The Mary Tyler Moore Show		Douglas Hines	CBS
1974 (26th)
1974 (26th)	The Blue Knight		Samuel E. Beetley, Gene Fowler and Marjorie Fowler	NBC
1974 (26th)	M*A*S*H		Fred W. Berger and Stanford Tischler	CBS
1974 (26th)	The Mary Tyler Moore Show		Douglas Hines and Bud S. Isaacs	CBS

Outstanding Film Editing for a Drama Series

Year	Program	Episode	Nominee(s)	Network
1975 (27th)
1975 (27th)	Petrocelli	"Mirror, Mirror on the Wall"	Donald R. Rode	NBC
1975 (27th)	The Streets of San Francisco	"Cry Help!"	Ray Daniels	ABC
1975 (27th)	The Streets of San Francisco	"The Mask of Death"	Jerry Young	ABC
1976 (28th)
1976 (28th)	Medical Story	"The Quality of Mercy"	Samuel E. Beetley and Ken Zemke	NBC
1976 (28th)	Medical Story	"The Right to Die"	Richard L. Van Enger	NBC
1976 (28th)	Rich Man, Poor Man	"Part 2"	Douglas Stewart	ABC
1976 (28th)	Rich Man, Poor Man	"Part 8"	Richard Bracken	ABC
1977 (29th)
1977 (29th)	Roots	"Part 1"	Neil Travis	ABC
1977 (29th)	Rich Man, Poor Man Book II	"Chapter 3"	Jerrold L. Ludwig	ABC
1977 (29th)	Roots	"Part 2"	James T. Heckert	ABC
1977 (29th)	Roots	"Part 3"	Peter Kirby	ABC
1977 (29th)	Roots	"Part 8"	Neil Travis and James T. Heckert	ABC
1978 (30th)
1978 (30th)	Holocaust		Stephen A. Rotter, Robert M. Reitano, Craig McKay, Alan Heim and Brian Smedley-Aston	NBC
1978 (30th)	Columbo	"How to Dial a Murder"	Robert Watts	NBC
1978 (30th)	Eight Is Enough	"Yes, Nicholas... There Is a Santa Claus"	David Blangsted and Howard Terrill	ABC
1978 (30th)	Family	"Acts of Love, Part 1"	Jim Faris	ABC
1978 (30th)	King		Byron 'Buzz' Brandt, Richard C. Meyer and David Berlatsky	NBC
1978 (30th)	The Waltons	"Grandma Comes Home"	Bill Mosher	CBS

Outstanding Film Editing for a Series

Year	Program	Episode	Nominee(s)	Network
1979 (31st)
1979 (31st)	Taxi	"Paper Marriage"	M. Pam Blumenthal	ABC
1979 (31st)	Dallas	"Reunion, Part 2"	Fred W. Berger	CBS
1979 (31st)	Lou Grant	"Hooker"	James Galloway	CBS
1979 (31st)	M*A*S*H	"The Billfold Syndrome"	Stanford Tischler and Larry L. Mills	CBS

=== 1980s ===
Year	Program	Episode	Nominee(s)	Network
1980 (32nd)
1980 (32nd)	Taxi	"Louie and the Nice Girl"	M. Pam Blumenthal	ABC
1980 (32nd)	M*A*S*H	"The Yalu Brick Road"	Stanford Tischler and Larry L. Mills	CBS
1980 (32nd)	Skag	"Pilot"	Sidney Katz	NBC
1980 (32nd)	Skag	"The Working Girl, Part 1"	Larry Strong	NBC
1981 (33rd)
1981 (33rd)	Taxi	"Elaine's Strange Triangle"	M. Pam Blumenthal and Jack Michon	ABC
1981 (33rd)	Dallas	"Ewing-Gate"	Fred W. Berger	CBS
1981 (33rd)	Dynasty	"The Dinner Party"	Dick Darling	ABC
1981 (33rd)	The Greatest American Hero	"Pilot"	Christopher Nelson	ABC
1981 (33rd)	Hill Street Blues	"Hill Street Station"	Ray Daniels and A. David Marshall	NBC
1981 (33rd)	Hill Street Blues	"Jungle Madness"	Clay Bartels	NBC
1981 (33rd)	Hill Street Blues	"Rites of Spring"	Tom Stevens	NBC
1981 (33rd)	Lou Grant	"Strike"	James Galloway	CBS
1981 (33rd)	M*A*S*H	"Death Takes a Holiday"	Stanford Tischler and Larry L. Mills	CBS
1981 (33rd)	Palmerstown, U.S.A.	"Crossroads"	Bernard Balmuth	CBS
1981 (33rd)	The White Shadow	"A Day in the Life"	Tony de Zarraga	CBS
1982 (34th)
1982 (34th)	Hill Street Blues	"Of Mouse and Man"	Andrew Chulack	NBC
1982 (34th)	Dallas	"The Split"	Fred W. Berger	CBS
1982 (34th)	Fame	"Musical Bridge"	Mark Melnick	NBC
1982 (34th)	Fame	"Passing Grade"	Michael A. Hoey	NBC
1982 (34th)	Hill Street Blues	"The Second Oldest Profession"	Ray Daniels	NBC
1982 (34th)	Quincy, M.E.	"For Love of Joshua"	Jeanene Ambler	NBC
1983 (35th)
1983 (35th)	Hill Street Blues	"Phantom of the Hill"	Ray Daniels	NBC
1983 (35th)	Cheers	"Endless Slumper"	Andrew Chulack	NBC
1983 (35th)	Dallas	"Ewing's Inferno"	Fred W. Berger	CBS
1983 (35th)	Dynasty	"La Mirage"	Bob Blake	ABC
1983 (35th)	M*A*S*H	"Goodbye, Farewell and Amen"	Stanford Tischler and Larry L. Mills	CBS
1983 (35th)	Matt Houston	"The Showgirl Murders"	Bob Bring	ABC
1983 (35th)	Quincy, M.E.	"Quincy's Wedding, Part 2"	Jeanene Ambler	NBC
1984 (36th)
1984 (36th)	Cheers	"Old Flames"	Andrew Chulack	NBC
1984 (36th)	Cagney & Lacey	"The Baby Broker"	Millie Moore	CBS
1984 (36th)	Cagney & Lacey	"Choices"	Geoffrey Rowland	CBS
1984 (36th)	Hill Street Blues	"Parting Is Such Sweep Sorrow"	Ray Daniels	NBC
1984 (36th)	Simon & Simon	"Double Play"	Larry Heath	CBS
1985 (37th)
1985 (37th)	Cagney & Lacey	"Who Said It's Fair?, Part 2"	Jim Gross	CBS
1985 (37th)	Crazy Like a Fox	"Pilot"	J. Terry Williams	CBS
1985 (37th)	Miami Vice	"Evan"	Robert A. Daniels	NBC
1985 (37th)	Miami Vice	"Smuggler's Blues"	Michael B. Hoggan	NBC
1985 (37th)	Murder, She Wrote	"The Murder of Sherlock Holmes"	Donald Douglas	CBS

Outstanding Single-Camera Picture Editing for a Series

Year	Program	Episode	Nominee(s)	Network
1986 (38th)
1986 (38th)	Moonlighting	"The Dream Sequence Always Rings Twice"	Neil Mandelberg	ABC
1986 (38th)	Amazing Stories	"The Mission"	Steven Kemper	NBC
1986 (38th)	Amazing Stories	"Mummy, Daddy"	Joe Ann Fogle	NBC
1986 (38th)	Miami Vice	"Out Where the Buses Don't Run"	Robert A. Daniels	NBC
1986 (38th)	Moonlighting	"Every Daughter's Father Is a Virgin"	Roger Bondelli	ABC
1987 (39th)
1987 (39th)	Moonlighting	"Atomic Shakespeare"	Roger Bondelli and Neil Mandelberg	ABC
1987 (39th)	Cagney & Lacey	"Turn, Turn, Turn, Part 1"	Jeanene Ambler	CBS
1987 (39th)	L.A. Law	"Pilot"	Ray Daniels and Joe Ann Fogle	NBC
1987 (39th)	L.A. Law	"The Venus Butterfly"	Bonnie Koehler	NBC
1987 (39th)	St. Elsewhere	"Afterlife"	John Heath	NBC
1988 (40th)
1988 (40th)	L.A. Law	"Full Marital Jacket"	Elodie Keene	NBC
1988 (40th)	China Beach	"Pilot"	Erwin Dumbrille and Christopher Nelson	ABC
1988 (40th)	Frank's Place	"Food Fight"	Marsh Hendry and Robert Souders	CBS
1988 (40th)	L.A. Law	"Divorce with Extreme Prejudice"	Quinnie Martin Jr.	NBC
1988 (40th)	Thirtysomething	"Therapy"	Victor Du Bois and Richard Freeman	ABC
1989 (41st)
1989 (41st)	Thirtysomething	"First Day/Last Day"	Steven Rosenblum	ABC
1989 (41st)	China Beach	"Vets"	Randy Jon Morgan	ABC
1989 (41st)	L.A. Law	"His Suit Is Hirsute"	Paul Dixon	NBC
1989 (41st)	Wiseguy	"White Noise"	Larry Strong and Ron Spang	CBS
1989 (41st)	The Wonder Years	"Loosiers"	Stuart Bass	ABC

=== 1990s ===
Year	Program	Episode	Nominee(s)	Network
1990 (42nd)
1990 (42nd)	Twin Peaks	"Pilot"	Duwayne Dunham	ABC
1990 (42nd)	China Beach	"The Unquiet Earth"	Susan Browdy	ABC
1990 (42nd)	Midnight Caller	"Someone to Love"	Roger Bondelli	NBC
1990 (42nd)	Star Trek: The Next Generation	"Deja Q"	Robert Lederman	Syndicated
1990 (42nd)	The Wonder Years	"Good-bye"	Michael Vejar	ABC
1991 (43rd)
1991 (43rd)	Cop Rock	"Pilot"	Thomas Moore	ABC
1991 (43rd)	DEA	"Pilot"	Dann Cahn	Fox
1991 (43rd)	Dinosaurs	"The Mighty Megalosaurus"	Marco Zappia	ABC
1991 (43rd)	L.A. Law	"God Rest Ye Murray Gentleman"	Jonathan Pontell	NBC
1992 (44th)
1992 (44th)	Northern Exposure	"Cicely"	Thomas Moore	CBS
1992 (44th)	Brooklyn Bridge	"War of the Worlds"	Roger Bondelli, Jerry U. Frizell and Ron Volk	CBS
1992 (44th)	Law & Order	"Misconception"	Arthur Forney	NBC
1992 (44th)	Northern Exposure	"Three Amigos"	Briana London	CBS
1992 (44th)	The Trials of Rosie O'Neill	"This Can't Be Love"	Jeanene Ambler	CBS
1993 (45th)
1993 (45th)	Quantum Leap	"Lee Harvey Oswald"	Jon Koslowsky	NBC
1993 (45th)	Brooklyn Bridge	"In the Still of the Night"	Ron Volk	CBS
1993 (45th)	Northern Exposure	"Thanksgiving"	Briana London	CBS
1993 (45th)	Sisters	"Crash and Born"	Susanne Malles	NBC
1994 (46th)
1994 (46th)	NYPD Blue	"Tempest in a C-Cup"	Stanford Allen	ABC
1994 (46th)	Christy	"A Closer Walk"	Jeanene Ambler	CBS
1994 (46th)	Law & Order	"Sanctuary"	Billy Fox, Laurie Grotstein	NBC
1994 (46th)	NYPD Blue	"Pilot"	Lawrence Jordan	ABC
1994 (46th)	Star Trek: The Next Generation	"All Good Things..."	Daryl Baskin, John Farrell and David Ramirez	Syndicated
1995 (47th)
1995 (47th)	ER	"Love's Labor Lost"	Randy Jon Morgan and Rick Tuber	NBC
1995 (47th)	Chicago Hope	"Pilot"	Lori Jane Coleman	CBS
1995 (47th)	Chicago Hope	"The Quarantine"	Randy Roberts	CBS
1995 (47th)	ER	"Pilot"	Randy Jon Morgan	NBC
1995 (47th)	The X-Files	"Duane Barry"	James Coblentz	Fox
1995 (47th)	The X-Files	"Sleepless"	Stephen Mark	Fox
1996 (48th)
1996 (48th)	JAG	"Pilot"	Jon Koslowsky	NBC
1996 (48th)	Chicago Hope	"Leave of Absence"	Jim Stewart	CBS
1996 (48th)	ER	"The Healers"	Randy Jon Morgan	NBC
1996 (48th)	ER	"Hell and Water High"	Jacque Elaine Toberen	NBC
1996 (48th)	NYPD Blue	"Death in the Family"	Craig Bench	ABC
1997 (49th)
1997 (49th)	ER	"The Long Way Around"	Randy Jon Morgan	NBC
1997 (49th)	Chicago Hope	"Days of the Rope"	Alec Smight, Mark C. Baldwin and Augie Hess	CBS
1997 (49th)	ER	"Union Station"	Kevin Casey	NBC
1997 (49th)	Law & Order	"Judgment in L.A., Part 2"	David Siegel	NBC
1997 (49th)	The X-Files	"Tempus Fugit"	Heather MacDougall	Fox
1997 (49th)	The X-Files	"Terma"	Jim Gross	Fox
1998 (50th)
1998 (50th)	The X-Files	"Kill Switch"	Heather MacDougall	Fox
1998 (50th)	Ally McBeal	"Cro-Magnon"	Thomas Moore	Fox
1998 (50th)	Chicago Hope	"Brain Salad Surgery"	Alec Smight	CBS
1998 (50th)	ER	"Exodus"	Kevin Casey	NBC
1998 (50th)	The X-Files	"Mind's Eye"	Casey Rohrs	Fox
1998 (50th)	The X-Files	"The Post-Modern Prometheus"	Lynne Willingham	Fox
1999 (51st)
1999 (51st)	The Sopranos	"Pilot"	Joanna Cappuccilli Lovetti	HBO
1999 (51st)	Ally McBeal	"Angels and Blimps"	Philip Carr Neel	Fox
1999 (51st)	ER	"The Storm, Part 1"	Kevin Casey	NBC
1999 (51st)	The X-Files	"S.R. 819"	Heather MacDougall	Fox

=== 2000s ===
Year	Program	Episode	Nominee(s)	Network
2000 (52nd)
2000 (52nd)	ER	"All in the Family"	Kevin Casey	NBC
2000 (52nd)	The Sopranos	"Funhouse"	Sidney Wolinsky	HBO
2000 (52nd)	The Sopranos	"The Knight in White Satin Armor"	William Stich	HBO
2000 (52nd)	The West Wing	"In Excelsis Deo"	Bill Johnson	NBC
2000 (52nd)	The West Wing	"What Kind of Day Has It Been"	Tina Hirsch	NBC
2001 (53rd)
2001 (53rd)	The West Wing	"Two Cathedrals"	Bill Johnson	NBC
2001 (53rd)	CSI: Crime Scene Investigation	"Pilot"	Alex Mackie and Alec Smight	CBS
2001 (53rd)	The Practice	"The Day After"	Susanne Malles	ABC
2001 (53rd)	The Sopranos	"Employee of the Month"	Sidney Wolinsky	HBO
2001 (53rd)	The Sopranos	"Pine Barrens"	Conrad Gonzalez	HBO

Outstanding Single-Camera Picture Editing for a Drama Series

Year	Program	Episode	Nominee(s)	Network
2002 (54th)	24	"7:00 a.m. – 8:00 a.m."	Chris Willingham	Fox
2002 (54th)	Alias	"Q & A"	Maryann Brandon	ABC
2002 (54th)	Six Feet Under	"Pilot"	Christopher Nelson	HBO
2002 (54th)	24	"12:00 a.m. – 1:00 a.m."	David Thompson	Fox
2002 (54th)	The West Wing	"100,000 Airplanes"	Janet Ashikaga	NBC
2002 (54th)	The West Wing	"Bartlet for America"	Lauren Schaffer	NBC
2003 (55th)	24	"Day 2: 5:00 a.m. – 6:00 a.m."	Chris Willingham	Fox
2003 (55th)	Alias	"Phase One"	Maryann Brandon	ABC
2003 (55th)	The Sopranos	"Whoever Did This"	William Stich	HBO
2003 (55th)	24	"Day 2: 8:00 a.m. – 9:00 a.m."	David Latham and Chris G. Willingham	Fox
2003 (55th)	The West Wing	"Twenty Five"	Janet Ashikaga	NBC
2004 (56th)	24	"Day 3: 10:00 a.m. – 11:00 a.m."	Chris Willingham	Fox
2004 (56th)	ER	"Freefall"	Kevin Casey	NBC
2004 (56th)	The Sopranos	"All Happy Families..."	Sidney Wolinsky	HBO
2004 (56th)	The Sopranos	"Irregular Around the Margins"	Conrad Gonzalez	HBO
2004 (56th)	The Sopranos	"Long Term Parking"	William Stich	HBO
2005 (57th)	Lost	"Pilot"	Mary Jo Markey	ABC
2005 (57th)	Deadwood	"A Lie Agreed Upon, Part 1"	Stephen Mark	HBO
2005 (57th)	24	"Day 4: 6:00 a.m. – 7:00 a.m."	Scott Powell	Fox
2005 (57th)	24	"Day 4: 7:00 a.m. – 8:00 a.m."	David Latham	Fox
2005 (57th)	24	"Day 4: 7:00 p.m. – 8:00 p.m."	Chris Willingham	Fox
2006 (58th)	24	"Day 5: 7:00 a.m. – 8:00 a.m."	David Latham	Fox
2006 (58th)	Boston Legal	"Race Ipsa"	Philip Carr Neel	ABC
2006 (58th)	Lost	"Live Together, Die Alone"	Sue Blainey, Sarah Boyd and Stephen Semel	ABC
2006 (58th)	Lost	"One of Them"	Sarah Boyd	ABC
2006 (58th)	24	"Day 5: 9:00 a.m. – 10:00 a.m."	Scott Powell	Fox
2007 (59th)	Dexter	"Dexter"	Elena Maganini	Showtime
2007 (59th)	Heroes	"Genesis"	Donn Aron, Louise Innes and Michael S. Murphy	NBC
2007 (59th)	Lost	"Through the Looking Glass"	Mark Goldman, Stephen Semel and Henk Van Eeghen	ABC
2007 (59th)	The Sopranos	"The Second Coming"	Lynne Whitlock	HBO
2007 (59th)	The Sopranos	"Soprano Home Movies"	William Stich	HBO
2008 (60th)	Breaking Bad	"Pilot"	Lynne Willingham	AMC
2008 (60th)	Battlestar Galactica	"He That Believeth in Me"	Julius Ramsey	Sci Fi
2008 (60th)	Boston Legal	"The Mighty Rogues"	Philip Carr Neel	ABC
2008 (60th)	Heroes	"Powerless"	Scott Boyd	NBC
2008 (60th)	Lost	"There's No Place Like Home, Part 2"	Robert Florio, Mark Goldman, Stephen Semel and Henk Van Eeghen	ABC
2008 (60th)	Terminator: The Sarah Connor Chronicles	"Pilot"	Paul Karasick	Fox
2009 (61st)	Breaking Bad	"ABQ"	Lynne Willingham	AMC
2009 (61st)	Battlestar Galactica	"Daybreak, Part 2"	Michael O'Halloran, Julius Ramsay and Andrew Seklir	Sci Fi
2009 (61st)	Lost	"The Incident"	Mark Goldman, Christopher Nelson and Stephen Semel	ABC
2009 (61st)	Mad Men	"Maidenform"	Cindy Mollo	AMC
2009 (61st)	24	"Day 7: 7:00 a.m. – 8:00 a.m."	Scott Powell	Fox

=== 2010s ===
Year	Program	Episode	Nominee(s)	Network
2010 (62nd)	Lost	"The End"	Mark Goldman, Christopher Nelson, Stephen Semel and Henk Van Eeghan	ABC
2010 (62nd)	Breaking Bad	"No Mas"	Skip Macdonald	AMC
2010 (62nd)	Dexter	"The Getaway"	Matthew Colonna	Showtime
2010 (62nd)	Mad Men	"Guy Walks Into an Advertising Agency"	Tom Wilson	AMC
2010 (62nd)	Mad Men	"The Gypsy and the Hobo"	Christopher Nelson and Pattye Rogers	AMC
2011 (63rd)	Boardwalk Empire	"Boardwalk Empire"	Sidney Wolinsky	HBO
2011 (63rd)	Dexter	"Take It!"	Louis Cioffi	Showtime
2011 (63rd)	The Killing	"Pilot"	Elizabeth Kling	AMC
2011 (63rd)	Mad Men	"Blowing Smoke"	Pattye Rogers and Leo Trombetta	AMC
2011 (63rd)	Mad Men	"The Suitcase"	Tom Wilson	AMC
2012 (64th)	Homeland	"Pilot"	Jordan Goldman and David Latham	Showtime
2012 (64th)	Breaking Bad	"End Times"	Kelley Dixon	AMC
2012 (64th)	Breaking Bad	"Face Off"	Skip Macdonald	AMC
2012 (64th)	Downton Abbey	"Episode Seven"	John Wilson	PBS
2012 (64th)	Mad Men	"Far Away Places"	Chris Gay	AMC
2013 (65th)	Breaking Bad	"Gliding Over All"	Kelley Dixon	AMC
2013 (65th)	Breaking Bad	"Dead Freight"	Skip Macdonald	AMC
2013 (65th)	Game of Thrones	"The Rains of Castamere"	Oral Ottey	HBO
2013 (65th)	House of Cards	"Chapter 1"	Kirk Baxter	Netflix
2013 (65th)	Mad Men	"Collaborators"	Chris Figler	AMC
2014 (66th)	Breaking Bad	"Felina"	Skip Macdonald	AMC
2014 (66th)	Breaking Bad	"Granite State"	Kelley Dixon and Chris McCaleb	AMC
2014 (66th)	Breaking Bad	"To'hajiilee"	Kelley Dixon	AMC
2014 (66th)	House of Cards	"Chapter 14"	Byron Smith	Netflix
2014 (66th)	True Detective	"Who Goes There"	Affonso Gonçalves	HBO
2015 (67th)	Game of Thrones	"The Dance of Dragons"	Katie Weiland	HBO
2015 (67th)	Better Call Saul	"Five-O"	Kelley Dixon	AMC
2015 (67th)	Better Call Saul	"Marco"	Kelley Dixon and Chris McCaleb	AMC
2015 (67th)	Game of Thrones	"Hardhome"	Tim Porter	HBO
2015 (67th)	Mad Men	"Person to Person"	Tom Wilson	AMC
2016 (68th)	Game of Thrones	"Battle of the Bastards"	Tim Porter	HBO
2016 (68th)	Better Call Saul	"Nailed"	Kelley Dixon and Chris McCaleb	AMC
2016 (68th)	Better Call Saul	"Rebecca"	Kelley Dixon	AMC
2016 (68th)	Game of Thrones	"Oathbreaker"	Katie Weiland	HBO
2016 (68th)	Narcos	"Descenso"	Leo Trombetta	Netflix
2017 (69th)
2017 (69th)	Stranger Things	"Chapter One: The Vanishing of Will Byers"	Dean Zimmerman	Netflix
2017 (69th)	Better Call Saul	"Chicanery"	Skip Macdonald	AMC
2017 (69th)	Better Call Saul	"Witness"	Kelley Dixon and Skip Macdonald	AMC
2017 (69th)	Stranger Things	"Chapter Seven: The Bathtub"	Kevin Ross	Netflix
2017 (69th)	Westworld	"The Bicameral Mind"	Andrew Seklir	HBO
2018 (70th)
2018 (70th)	The Handmaid's Tale	"June"	Wendy Hallam Martin	Hulu
2018 (70th)	Game of Thrones	"Beyond the Wall"	Tim Porter	HBO
2018 (70th)	Game of Thrones	"The Dragon and the Wolf"	Crispin Green	HBO
2018 (70th)	Game of Thrones	"The Spoils of War"	Katie Weiland	HBO
2018 (70th)	Stranger Things	"Chapter Nine: The Gate"	Kevin Ross	Netflix
2019 (71st)
2019 (71st)	Game of Thrones	"The Long Night"	Tim Porter	HBO
2019 (71st)	Game of Thrones	"The Iron Throne"	Katie Weiland	HBO
2019 (71st)	Game of Thrones	"Winterfell"	Crispin Green	HBO
2019 (71st)	The Handmaid's Tale	"The Word"	Wendy Hallam Martin	Hulu
2019 (71st)	Killing Eve	"Desperate Times"	Dan Crinnion	BBC America
2019 (71st)	Ozark	"One Way Out"	Cindy Mollo and Heather Goodwin Floyd	Netflix

=== 2020s ===
Year	Program	Episode	Nominee(s)	Network
2020 (72nd)
2020 (72nd)	Succession	"This Is Not for Tears"	Bill Henry and Venya Bruk	HBO
2020 (72nd)	The Mandalorian	"Chapter 2: The Child"	Andrew S. Eisen	Disney+
2020 (72nd)	The Mandalorian	"Chapter 4: Sanctuary"	Dana E. Glauberman and Dylan Firshein	Disney+
2020 (72nd)	The Mandalorian	"Chapter 8: Redemption"	Jeff Seibenick	Disney+
2020 (72nd)	Ozark	"Fire Pink"	Vikash Patel	Netflix
2020 (72nd)	Ozark	"Wartime"	Cindy Mollo	Netflix
2020 (72nd)	Stranger Things	"Chapter Eight: The Battle of Starcourt"	Dean Zimmerman and Katheryn Naranjo	Netflix
2020 (72nd)	Succession	"DC"	Ken Eluto	HBO
2021 (73rd)
2021 (73rd)	The Crown	"Fairytale"	Yan Miles	Netflix
2021 (73rd)	The Crown	"Avalanche"	Paulo Pandolpho	Netflix
2021 (73rd)	The Handmaid's Tale	"The Crossing"	Wendy Hallam Martin	Hulu
2021 (73rd)	The Mandalorian	"Chapter 11: The Heiress"	Dylan Firshen and J. Erik Jessen	Disney+
2021 (73rd)	The Mandalorian	"Chapter 13: The Jedi"	Andrew Eisen	Disney+
2021 (73rd)	The Mandalorian	"Chapter 15: The Believer"	Jeff Seibenick	Disney+
2021 (73rd)	The Mandalorian	"Chapter 16: The Rescue"	Adam Gerstel	Disney+
2022 (74th)
2022 (74th)	Euphoria	"The Theater and Its Double"	Laura Zempel, Julio C. Perez IV, Nikola Boyanov and Aaron I. Butler	HBO
2022 (74th)	Severance	"In Perpetuity"	Erica Freed Marker and Geoffrey Richman	Apple TV+
2022 (74th)	Severance	"The We We Are"	Geoffrey Richman	Apple TV+
2022 (74th)	Squid Game	"Gganbu"	Nam Na-yeong	Netflix
2022 (74th)	Stranger Things	"Chapter Four: Dear Billy"	Dean Zimmerman and Casey Cichocki	Netflix
2022 (74th)	Succession	"All the Bells Say"	Ken Eluto and Ellen Tam	HBO
2022 (74th)	Succession	"Chiantishire"	Jane Rizzo	HBO
2023 (75th)
2023 (75th)	The Last of Us	"Endure and Survive"	Timothy Good and Emily Mendez	HBO
2023 (75th)	Better Call Saul	"Saul Gone"	Skip Macdonald	AMC
2023 (75th)	Succession	"America Decides"	Jane Rizzo	HBO
2023 (75th)	Succession	"Connor's Wedding"	Bill Henry	HBO
2023 (75th)	Succession	"With Open Eyes"	Ken Eluto	HBO
2023 (75th)	The White Lotus	"Abductions"	Heather Persons	HBO
2023 (75th)	The White Lotus	"Arrivederci"	John Valerio	HBO
2024 (76th)
2024 (76th)	Shōgun	"A Dream of a Dream"	Maria Gonzales and Aika Miyake	FX
2024 (76th)	Fallout	"The End"	Ali Comperchio	Prime Video
2024 (76th)	Fallout	"The Ghouls"	Yoni Reiss	Prime Video
2024 (76th)	Mr. & Mrs. Smith	"First Date"	Kyle Reiter and Isaac Hagy	Prime Video
2024 (76th)	Slow Horses	"Footprints"	Zsófia Tálas	Apple TV+
2024 (76th)	3 Body Problem	"Judgment Day"	Michael Ruscio	Netflix
2025 (77th)
2025 (77th)	Andor	"Who Are You?"	Yan Miles	Disney+
2025 (77th)	The Last of Us	"Through the Valley"	Timothy Good	HBO
2025 (77th)	Severance	"Attila"	Joseph Landauer	Apple TV+
2025 (77th)	Severance	"Chikhai Bardo"	Keith Fraase	Apple TV+
2025 (77th)	Severance	"Cold Harbor"	Geoffrey Richman	Apple TV+
2025 (77th)	The White Lotus	"Amor Fati"	John Valerio and Scott Turner	HBO
2026 (78th)
2026 (78th)	Pluribus	"We Is Us"	Skip Macdonald	Apple TV
2026 (78th)	Euphoria	"In God We Trust"	Aaron I. Butler, Nikola Boyanov, Aleshka Ferrero, Julio C. Perez IV and Kristin Valentine	HBO
2026 (78th)	The Pitt	"1:00 P.M."	Tamara Luciano	HBO Max
2026 (78th)	The Pitt	"9:00 P.M."	Mark Strand	HBO Max
2026 (78th)	Pluribus	"Got Milk"	Joey Liew	Apple TV
2026 (78th)	Pluribus	"Grenade"	Chris McCaleb	Apple TV
2026 (78th)	Task	"A Still Small Voice"	Keiko Deguchi and Amy E. Duddleston	HBO

== Editors with multiple awards ==
3 awards

- M. Pam Blumenthal
- Chris G. Willingham

2 awards

- Samuel E. Beetley
- Andrew Chulack
- Gene Fowler
- Marjorie Fowler
- Jon Koslowsky
- David Latham
- Skip Macdonald
- Neil Mandelberg
- Yan Miles
- Thomas R. Moore
- Randy Jon Morgan
- Bill Mosher
- Tim Porter
- Lynne Willingham

== Programs with multiple awards ==
4 awards

- 24 (3 consecutive)
- Breaking Bad (2 consecutive, twice)

3 awards

- ER
- Game of Thrones (2 consecutive)

2 awards

- Hill Street Blues (consecutive)
- Lost
- Moonlighting (consecutive)

== Editors with multiple nominations ==
9 nominations

- Kelley Dixon

8 nominations

- Skip Macdonald

6 nominations

- Fred W. Berger
- Ray Daniels
- Christopher Nelson
- Stanford Tischler

5 nominations

- Jeanene Ambler
- Kevin Casey
- Randy Jon Morgan
- Stephen Semel
- Chris G. Willingham

4 nominations

- Roger Bondelli
- Mark Goldman
- David Latham
- Chris McCaleb
- Larry L. Mills
- Tim Porter
- William B. Stich
- Katie Weiland
- Sidney Wolinsky

3 nominations

- M. Pam Blumenth
- Joseph Dervin
- Henk Van Eeghen
- Ken Eluto
- Heather MacDougall
- Wendy Hallam Martin
- Cindy Mollo
- Thomas R. Moore
- Bill Mosher
- Philip Carr Neel
- Scott Powell
- Donald R. Rode
- Alec Smight
- Robert Watts
- Lynne Willingham
- Tom Wilson
- Dean Zimmerman

2 nominations

- Janet Ashikaga
- Samuel E. Beetley
- Henry Berman
- Sarah Boyd
- Richard Bracken
- Nikola Boyanov
- Maryann Brandon
- Aaron I. Butler
- William T. Cartwright
- Robert A. Daniels
- Andrew S. Eisen
- Dylan Firshein
- Joe Ann Fogle
- Gene Fowler
- Marjorie Fowler
- John C. Fuller
- James Galloway
- Conrad M. Gonzalez
- Crispin Green
- Jim Gross
- William Gulick
- James T. Heckert
- Bill Henry
- Arthur David Hilton
- Douglas Hines
- Bill Johnson
- Sidney Katz
- Jon Koslowsky
- Briana London
- Susanne Malles
- Neil Mandelberg
- Stephen Mark
- Julio C. Perez IV
- Jane Rizzo
- Pattye Rogers
- Kevin D Ross
- Jeff Seibenick
- Andrew Seklir
- Douglas Stewart
- Larry Strong
- Neil Travis
- Leo Trombetta
- Ron Volk
- J. Terry Williams

== Programs with multiple nominations ==
11 nominations

- Game of Thrones
- The Sopranos
- 24

10 nominations

- Breaking Bad
- ER

8 nominations

- Mad Men
- The X-Files

7 nominations

- Better Call Saul
- Lost
- The Mandalorian
- Succession

6 nominations

- Hill Street Blues
- L.A. Law
- The West Wing

5 nominations

- Chicago Hope
- Severance
- Stranger Things

4 nominations

- Cagney & Lacey
- Dallas
- Mission: Impossible
- Roots

3 nominations

- China Beach
- Dexter
- The Handmaid's Tale
- Law & Order
- Miami Vice
- Moonlighting
- Northern Exposure
- NYPD Blue
- Ozark
- Pluribus
- The West Wing
- The White Lotus

2 nominations

- Alias
- Amazing Stories
- Battlestar Galactica
- The Bold Ones: The Senator
- Boston Legal
- The Crown
- Dynasty
- Euphoria
- Fallout
- Fame
- Heroes
- House of Cards
- The Last of Us
- Lou Grant
- The Man from U.N.C.L.E.
- Medical Story
- The Pitt
- Quincy, M.E.
- Rich Man, Poor Man
- Skag
- Star Trek
- Star Trek: The Next Generation
- The Streets of San Francisco
- Thirtysomething
