= List of awards and nominations received by Hill Street Blues =

Hill Street Blues awards and nominations
Awards and nominations
Award	Wins	Nominations
Artios Awards	1	3
Broadcasting Press Guild Awards	1	1
Directors Guild of America Awards	4	8
Eddie Awards	2	5
Edgar Awards	1	1
Emmy Awards	24	96
George Foster Peabody Awards	1	1
Golden Globe Awards	3	11
Humanitas Prizes	3	5
NAACP Image Awards	0	1
People's Choice Awards	5	5
Q Awards	4	4
Television Critics Association Awards	1	1
TP de Oro, Spain	1	1
TV Land Awards	0	4
Writers Guild of America Awards	4	15

Totals (Note: Certain award groups do not simply award one winner. They acknowledge several different recipients, have runners-up, and have third place. Since this is a specific recognition and is different from losing an award, runner-up mentions are considered wins in this award tally. For simplification and to avoid errors, each award in this list has been presumed to have had a prior nomination.)
- Wins: 55
- Nominations: 162

Hill Street Blues is an American drama series that aired on NBC from January 15, 1981 until May 12, 1987. It was nominated for a variety of different awards and holds several notable all-time records. It was nominated for the most Primetime Emmy Award for Outstanding Supporting Actor in a Drama Series (16) and Primetime Emmy Award for Outstanding Supporting Actress in a Drama Series (13), and won the most Primetime Emmy Award for Outstanding Drama Series (4) as well as most combined Outstanding Drama Series, Primetime Emmy for Drama Writing, and Primetime Emmy for Drama Directing (10). In addition to these all-time records, it holds the record for single season regular cast (Drama Lead Actor, Drama Supporting Actor, Drama Lead Actress, and Drama Supporting Actress) acting nominations (9), as well as being the only series to sweep all five nominations in the Primetime Emmy Award for Outstanding Supporting Actor in a Drama Series in a single year. At the 35th Primetime Emmy Awards, it became the first of just two shows ever (NYPD Blue, 46th Primetime Emmy Awards) to sweep all five nominations for Primetime Emmy for Drama Writing.

Its pilot episode, "Hill Street Station," was the only episode in television history to win both Primetime Emmy Award for Outstanding Directing for a Drama Series and Directors Guild of America Award for Outstanding Directing – Drama Series, as well as both Primetime Emmy Award for Outstanding Writing for a Drama Series and Writers Guild of America Award for Television: Episodic Drama.

At the 33rd Primetime Emmy Awards in 1981, Season 1 earned a record-setting total for a weekly series of 21 Primetime Emmy Award nominations, which was not surpassed until NYPD Blue earned 26 in 1994 with its first season. Hill Street Blues set the record for most Emmy wins by a series' first season with eight, later matched by NYPD Blue, ER (in 1995), and finally surpassed by The West Wing (in 2000) with nine (also setting the record for any season). The West Wing, L.A. Law, and Mad Men share the record of four Outstanding Drama Series wins with Hill Street Blues. Nine regular cast Emmy nominations is a record also shared with The West Wing and L.A. Law.

== Directors Guild of America Awards ==
Year	Category	Nominee(s)	Episode	Result
1981	Outstanding Directing – Drama Series	Robert Butler, Robert S. Mendelsohn, John Slosser, Carl Dubliclay	"Hill Street Station"	Won
1981	Outstanding Directing – Drama Series	Georg Stanford Brown	"Up in Arms"	Nominated
1981	Outstanding Directing – Drama Series	David Anspaugh	"The Last White Man on East Ferry Avenue"	Nominated
1982	Outstanding Directing – Drama Series	David Anspaugh, Cal Naylor, Rick Wallace, Dale White, Jack Philbrick	"Personal Foul"	Won
1983	Outstanding Directing – Drama Series	Jeff Bleckner, Sascha Schneider, Herb Adelman, Conrad Irving, Jack Philbrick	"Life in the Minors"	Won
1983	Outstanding Directing – Drama Series	Christian I. Nyby II	"Here's Adventure, Here's Romance"	Nominated
1983	Outstanding Directing – Drama Series	Corey Allen	"Goodbye, Mr. Scripps"	Nominated
1984	Outstanding Directing – Drama Series	Thomas Carter, Burt Bluestein, Herb Adelman, Jack Philbrick	"The Rise and Fall of Paul the Wall"	Won

== Edgar Awards ==
Year	Category	Nominee(s)	Episode	Result
1982	Best Television Episode	Steven Bochco, Michael Kozoll	"Hill Street Station"	Won

== Emmy Awards ==
=== Primetime Emmy Awards ===
Year	Category	Nominee(s)	Episode	Result
1981	Outstanding Directing for a Drama Series	Robert Butler	"Hill Street Station"	Won
1981	Outstanding Directing for a Drama Series	Corey Allen	"Jungle Madness"	Nominated
1981	Outstanding Directing for a Drama Series	Georg Stanford Brown	"Up In Arms"	Nominated
1981	Outstanding Writing for a Drama Series	Michael Kozoll, Steven Bochco	"Hill Street Station"	Won
1981	Outstanding Writing for a Drama Series	Michael Kozoll, Steven Bochco, Anthony Yerkovich	"Jungle Madness"	Nominated
1981	Outstanding Lead Actor in a Drama Series	Daniel J. Travanti as Captain Frank Furillo		Won
1981	Outstanding Lead Actress in a Drama Series	Barbara Babcock as Grace Gardner	"Fecund Hand Rose"	Won
1981	Outstanding Lead Actress in a Drama Series	Veronica Hamel as Joyce Davenport		Nominated
1981	Outstanding Supporting Actor in a Drama Series	Michael Conrad as Sgt. Phil Esterhaus		Won
1981	Outstanding Supporting Actor in a Drama Series	Charles Haid as Officer Andy Renko		Nominated
1981	Outstanding Supporting Actor in a Drama Series	Bruce Weitz as Detective Mick Belker		Nominated
1981	Outstanding Supporting Actress in a Drama Series	Barbara Bosson as Fay Furillo		Nominated
1981	Outstanding Supporting Actress in a Drama Series	Betty Thomas as Sgt. Lucille Bates		Nominated
1981	Outstanding Drama Series	Steven Bochco, Michael Kozoll, Gregory Hoblit		Won
1982	Outstanding Directing for a Drama Series	Jeff Bleckner	"The World According to Freedom"	Nominated
1982	Outstanding Directing for a Drama Series	Robert Butler	"The Second Oldest Profession"	Nominated
1982	Outstanding Writing for a Drama Series	Steven Bochco, Anthony Yerkovich, Jeff Lewis, Michael Wagner, Michael Kozoll	"Freedom's Last Stand"	Won
1982	Outstanding Writing for a Drama Series	Steven Bochco, Anthony Yerkovich, Robert Crais, Michael Kozoll	"The Second Oldest Profession"	Nominated
1982	Outstanding Writing for a Drama Series	Steven Bochco, Anthony Yerkovich, Jeff Lewis, Michael Wagner	"Personal Foul"	Nominated
1982	Outstanding Writing for a Drama Series	Michael Wagner	"The World According to Freedom"	Nominated
1982	Outstanding Lead Actor in a Drama Series	Daniel J. Travanti as Captain Frank Furillo		Won
1982	Outstanding Lead Actress in a Drama Series	Veronica Hamel as Joyce Davenport		Nominated
1982	Outstanding Supporting Actor in a Drama Series	Michael Conrad as Sgt. Phil Esterhaus		Won
1982	Outstanding Supporting Actor in a Drama Series	Charles Haid as Officer Andy Renko		Nominated
1982	Outstanding Supporting Actor in a Drama Series	Bruce Weitz as Detective Mick Belker		Nominated
1982	Outstanding Supporting Actor in a Drama Series	Michael Warren as Officer Bobby Hill		Nominated
1982	Outstanding Supporting Actor in a Drama Series	Taurean Blacque as Detective Neal Washington		Nominated
1982	Outstanding Supporting Actress in a Drama Series	Barbara Bosson as Fay Furillo		Nominated
1982	Outstanding Supporting Actress in a Drama Series	Betty Thomas as Sgt. Lucille Bates		Nominated
1982	Outstanding Drama Series	Steven Bochco, Gregory Hoblit, David Anspaugh, Anthony Yerkovich		Won
1983	Outstanding Directing for a Drama Series	Jeff Bleckner	"Life in the Minors"	Won
1983	Outstanding Writing for a Drama Series	David Milch	"Trial By Fury"	Won
1983	Outstanding Writing for a Drama Series	Steven Bochco, Anthony Yerkovich, Jeff Lewis	"A Hair of the Dog"	Nominated
1983	Outstanding Writing for a Drama Series	Karen Hall	"Officer of the Year"	Nominated
1983	Outstanding Writing for a Drama Series	Michael Wagner, David Milch, Steven Bochco, Anthony Yerkovich, Jeff Lewis	"No Body's Perfect"	Nominated
1983	Outstanding Writing for a Drama Series	Anthony Yerkovich, David Milch, Karen Hall, Steven Bochco, Jeff Lewis	"Eugene's Comedy Empire Strikes Back"	Nominated
1983	Outstanding Lead Actor in a Drama Series	Daniel J. Travanti as Captain Frank Furillo		Nominated
1983	Outstanding Lead Actress in a Drama Series	Veronica Hamel as Joyce Davenport		Nominated
1983	Outstanding Supporting Actor in a Drama Series	Michael Conrad as Sgt. Phil Esterhaus		Nominated
1983	Outstanding Supporting Actor in a Drama Series	Bruce Weitz as Detective Mick Belker		Nominated
1983	Outstanding Supporting Actor in a Drama Series	Joe Spano as Sgt. Henry Goldblume		Nominated
1983	Outstanding Supporting Actress in a Drama Series	Barbara Bosson as Fay Furillo		Nominated
1983	Outstanding Supporting Actress in a Drama Series	Betty Thomas as Sgt. Lucille Bates		Nominated
1983	Outstanding Drama Series	Steven Bochco, Gregory Hoblit, Anthony Yerkovich, David Anspaugh, Scott Brazil		Won
1984	Outstanding Directing for a Drama Series	Corey Allen	"Goodbye, Mr. Scripps"	Won
1984	Outstanding Directing for a Drama Series	Thomas Carter	"Midway to What?"	Nominated
1984	Outstanding Directing for a Drama Series	Arthur Allan Seidelman	"Doris in Wonderland"	Nominated
1984	Outstanding Writing for a Drama Series	Jeff Lewis, Michael Wagner, Karen Hall, Mark Frost, Steven Bochco, David Milch	"Grace Under Pressure"	Nominated
1984	Outstanding Writing for a Drama Series	Peter Silverman, Steven Bochco, Jeff Lewis, David Milch	"Doris in Wonderland"	Nominated
1984	Outstanding Lead Actor in a Drama Series	Daniel J. Travanti as Captain Frank Furillo		Nominated
1984	Outstanding Lead Actress in a Drama Series	Veronica Hamel as Joyce Davenport		Nominated
1984	Outstanding Supporting Actor in a Drama Series	Bruce Weitz as Detective Mick Belker		Won
1984	Outstanding Supporting Actor in a Drama Series	Michael Conrad as Sgt. Phil Esterhaus		Nominated
1984	Outstanding Supporting Actor in a Drama Series	James Sikking as Lt. Howard Hunter		Nominated
1984	Outstanding Supporting Actress in a Drama Series	Alfre Woodard as Doris Robson	"Doris in Wonderland".	Won
1984	Outstanding Supporting Actress in a Drama Series	Barbara Bosson as Fay Furillo		Nominated
1984	Outstanding Supporting Actress in a Drama Series	Betty Thomas as Sgt. Lucille Bates		Nominated
1984	Outstanding Drama Series	Steven Bochco, Gregory Hoblit, Scott Brazil, Jeff Lewis, Sascha Schneider, David J. Latt		Won
1985	Outstanding Directing for a Drama Series	Georg Stanford Brown	"El Capitan"	Nominated
1985	Outstanding Directing for a Drama Series	Thomas Carter	"The Rise and Fall of Paul the Wall"	Nominated
1985	Outstanding Writing for a Drama Series	Jacob Epstein, Michael Wagner	"The Rise and Fall of Paul the Wall"	Nominated
1985	Outstanding Lead Actor in a Drama Series	Daniel J. Travanti as Captain Frank Furillo		Nominated
1985	Outstanding Lead Actress in a Drama Series	Veronica Hamel as Joyce Davenport		Nominated
1985	Outstanding Supporting Actor in a Drama Series	Bruce Weitz as Detective Mick Belker		Nominated
1985	Outstanding Supporting Actress in a Drama Series	Betty Thomas as Sgt. Lucille Bates		Won
1985	Outstanding Supporting Actress in a Drama Series	Barbara Bosson as Fay Furillo		Nominated
1985	Outstanding Drama Series	Steven Bochco, Gregory Hoblit, Scott Brazil, Jeff Lewis, David Milch		Nominated
1986	Outstanding Directing for a Drama Series	Gabrielle Beaumont	"Two Easy Pieces"	Nominated
1986	Outstanding Writing for a Drama Series	Dick Wolf	"What Are Friends For?"	Nominated
1986	Outstanding Supporting Actor in a Drama Series	Bruce Weitz as Detective Mick Belker		Nominated
1986	Outstanding Supporting Actress in a Drama Series	Betty Thomas as Sgt. Lucille Bates		Nominated
1986	Outstanding Drama Series	Jeff Lewis, David Milch, Scott Brazil, Michael Vittes, Walon Green, Penny Adams		Nominated
1987	Outstanding Writing for a Drama Series	Jeff Lewis, David Milch, John Romano	"It Ain't Over Till It's Over"	Nominated
1987	Outstanding Supporting Actress in a Drama Series	Betty Thomas as Sgt. Lucille Bates		Nominated

=== Creative Arts Emmy Awards ===
Year	Category	Nominee(s)	Episode	Result
1981	Outstanding Achievement in Film Sound Editing	Sam Horta, Bob Cornett, Denise Horta, Eileen Horta	"Hill Street Station"	Won
1981	Outstanding Cinematography for a Series	William Cronjager	"Hill Street Station"	Won
1981	Outstanding Achievement in Film Editing for a Series	Clay Bartels	"Jungle Madness"	Nominated
1981	Outstanding Achievement in Film Editing for a Series	Ray Daniels, A. David Marshall	"Hill Street Station"	Nominated
1981	Outstanding Achievement in Film Editing for a Series	Tom Stevens	"Rites of Spring"	Nominated
1981	Outstanding Achievement in Music Composition for a Series (Dramatic Underscore)	Mike Post	"Hill Street Station"	Nominated
1981	Outstanding Art Direction for a Series	Jeffrey L. Goldstein, Joseph A. Armetta	"Hill Street Station"	Nominated
1982	Outstanding Achievement in Film Sound Mixing	Bill Marky, Robert W. Glass Jr., Bill Nicholson, Howard Wilmarth	"Personal Foul"	Won
1982	Outstanding Achievement in Film Sound Mixing	Bill Marky, Don Cahn, Jim Cook, Robert L. Harman	"The Second Oldest Profession"	Nominated
1982	Outstanding Achievement in Film Editing for a Series	Andrew Chulack	"Of Mouse and Man"	Won
1982	Outstanding Achievement in Film Editing for a Series	Ray Daniels	"The Second Oldest Profession"	Nominated
1982	Outstanding Art Direction for a Series	Jeffrey L. Goldstein, Jame Cane	"Personal Foul"	Nominated
1983	Outstanding Achievement in Film Editing for a Series	Ray Daniels	"Phantom of the Hill"	Won
1983	Outstanding Achievement in Film Editing for a Series	Sam Horta, Donald W. Ernst, Avram D. Gold, Eileen Horta, Constance A. Kazmer, Gary Krivacek	"The Second Oldest Profession"	Won
1983	Outstanding Film Sound Mixing for a Series	Bill Marky, John Asman, Bill Nicholson, Ken S. Polk	"Trial By Fury"	Won
1984	Outstanding Achievement in Film Editing for a Series	Ray Daniels	"Parting is Such Sweep Sorrow"	Nominated
1984	Outstanding Film Sound Mixing for a Series	David Schneiderman, John Asman, Bill Nicholson, Ken S. Polk	"Parting is Such Sweep Sorrow"	Won
1984	Outstanding Film Sound Mixing for a Series	Bill Marky, John Asman, Bill Nicholson, Ken S. Polk	"Praise Dilaudid"	Nominated
1984	Outstanding Film Sound Editing for a Series	Sam Horta, Denise Horta, Ted Johnston, Constance A. Kazmer, Gary Krivacek, David John West, Allan K. Rosen	"Parting is Such Sweep Sorrow"	Nominated
1985	Outstanding Film Sound Mixing for a Series	Sunny Meyer, John Asman, Bill Nicholson, Ken S. Polk	"The Rise and Fall of Paul the Wall"	Nominated
1985	Outstanding Film Sound Mixing for a Series	James Pilcher, John Asman, Bill Nicholson, Ken S. Polk	"Queen For a Day"	Nominated
1986	Outstanding Film Sound Mixing for a Series	John 'Pee Wee' Carter, William Gazecki, Andy MacDonald, Bill Nicholson	"Iced Coffey"	Nominated
1986	Outstanding Sound Editing for a Series	Gary Krivacek, Timothy J. Borquez, Mark R. Crookston, Bill Dannevick, Stephen Janisz, Mary Ruth Smith, Jerelyn J. Harding, Don Sanders	"Two Easy Pieces"	Nominated
1987	Outstanding Film Sound Mixing for a Series	William Gazecki, Bill Nicholson, Peter Reale, Dean Vernon	"It Ain't Over Till It's Over"	Nominated

== Golden Globe Awards ==
Year	Category	Nominee(s)	Result
1982	Best Actor – Television Drama Series	Daniel J. Travanti as Captain Frank Furillo	Won
1982	Best Television Series – Drama		Won
1983	Best Actor – Television Drama Series	Daniel J. Travanti as Captain Frank Furillo	Nominated
1983	Best Television Series – Drama		Won
1984	Best Actor – Television Drama Series	Daniel J. Travanti as Captain Frank Furillo	Nominated
1984	Best Television Series – Drama		Nominated
1985	Best Actor – Television Drama Series	Daniel J. Travanti as Captain Frank Furillo	Nominated
1985	Best Supporting Actor – Series, Miniseries or Television Film	Bruce Weitz as Detective Mick Belker	Nominated
1985	Best Television Series – Drama		Nominated
1986	Best Actor – Television Drama Series	Daniel J. Travanti as Captain Frank Furillo	Nominated
1986	Best Supporting Actor – Series, Miniseries or Television Film	Bruce Weitz as Detective Mick Belker	Nominated

== Humanitas Prize ==
Year	Category	Nominee(s)	Episode	Result
1981	60 Minute Category	Michael Kozoll, Steven Bochco		Won
1982	60 Minute Category	Michael Wagner	"The World According To Freedom"	Nominated
1983	60 Minute Category	David Milch		Won
1984	60 Minute Category	Peter Silverman		Won
1985	60 Minute Category	David Milch, Roger Director, Steven Bochco, Jeffrey Lewis	"Watt A Way To Go"	Nominated

== Writers Guild of America Awards ==
Year	Category	Nominee(s)	Episode	Result
1981	Television: Episodic Drama	Michael Kozoll & Steven Bochco	"Hill Street Station"	Won
1981	Television: Episodic Drama	Anthony Yerkovich	"Film at Eleven"	Nominated
1982	Television: Episodic Drama	Michael Wagner	"The World According to Freedom"	Won
1982	Television: Episodic Drama	Jeffrey Lewis	"Fruits of the Poisonous Tree"	Nominated
1983	Television: Episodic Drama	David Milch	"Trial by Fury"	Won
1983	Television: Episodic Drama	Anthony Yerkovich, David Milch, Karen Hall, Steven Bochco, and Jeffrey Lewis	"Eugene's Comedy Empire Strikes Back"	Nominated
1983	Television: Episodic Drama	David Milch, Jeffrey Lewis, Michael Wagner	"Gung Ho!"	Nominated
1984	Television: Episodic Drama	Jeffrey Lewis, Michael Wagner, Karen Hall, Mark Frost, Steven Bochco, and David Milch	"Grace Under Pressure"	Won
1984	Television: Episodic Drama	David Milch & Mark Frost	"Death by Kiki"	Nominated
1984	Television: Episodic Drama	Jeffrey Lewis, Michael Wagner, David Milch, Mark Frost, and Steven Bochco	"Parting is Such Sweep Sorrow"	Nominated
1985	Television: Episodic Drama	David Milch, Roger Director, Steven Bochco, and Jeffrey Lewis	"Watt a Way to Go"	Nominated
1986	Television: Episodic Drama	Walon Green, Jeffrey Lewis, and David Milch	"Remembrance of Hits Past"	Nominated
1986	Television: Episodic Drama	Dick Wolf	"What Are Friends For?"	Nominated
1987	Television: Episodic Drama	Jeffrey Lewis & Jerry Patrick Brown	"Fathers and Guns"	Nominated
1987	Television: Episodic Drama	David Black	"More Skinned Against than Skinning"	Nominated

== Other awards ==
=== Artios Awards ===
Year	Category	Nominee(s)	Result
1985	Best Casting for TV, Dramatic Episodic	Lori Openden, Simon Ayer	Won
1986	Best Casting for TV, Dramatic Episodic	Sally Powers	Nominated
1987	Best Casting for TV, Dramatic Episodic	Sally Powers	Nominated

=== Broadcasting Press Guild Awards ===
Year	Category	Result
1983	Best Imported TV Programme	Won

=== Eddie Awards ===
Year	Category	Nominee(s)	Episode	Result
1983	Best Edited Episode from a Television Series	David Rosenbloom	"World According to Freedom"	Nominated
1983	Best Edited Episode from a Television Series	Ray Daniels	"Phantom of the Hill"	Nominated
1984	Best Edited Episode from a Television Series	David Saxon	"Here's Adventure, Here's Romance"	Won
1985	Best Edited Episode from a Television Series	David Saxon	"Blues for Mr. Green"	Nominated
1987	Best Edited Episode from a Television Series	Geoffrey Rowland	"Two Easy Pieces"	Won

=== Image Awards ===
Year	Category	Episode	Result
1982	Best Episode in a Dramatic Series	"Fruits of the Poisonous Tree"	Nominated

=== Peabody Awards ===
Year	Category	Nominee(s)	Episode	Result
1982		(National Broadcasting Company (NBC) (NBC Television) and MTM Enterprises Inc.).		Won

=== People's Choice Awards ===
Year	Category	Result
1982	Favorite New TV Dramatic Program	Won
1982	Favorite Overall New TV Program	Won
1983	Favorite TV Dramatic Program	Won
1984	Favorite TV Dramatic Program	Won
1987	Favorite TV Dramatic Program	Won

=== TP de Oro, Spain ===
Year	Category	Result
1988	Best Foreign Series (Mejor Serie Extranjera)	Won

=== TV Land Awards ===
Year	Category	Nominee(s)	Result
2003	Favorite Crimestopper in a Drama	Daniel J. Travanti	Nominated
2003	Drama Theme Song You Can't Get Out of Your Head		Nominated
2004	Favorite Instrumental Theme Song		Nominated
2005	Favorite "Casual Friday" Cop	Bruce Weitz	Nominated

=== Television Critics Association Awards ===
Year	Category	Result
1987	Career Achievement Award	Won

=== Q Awards ===
Year	Category	Nominee(s)	Result
1985	Best Actor in a Quality Drama Series	Daniel J. Travanti	Won
1985	Best Supporting Actor in a Quality Drama Series	Bruce Weitz	Won
1985	Best Supporting Actress in a Quality Drama Series	Veronica Hamel	Won
1986	Best Supporting Actress in a Quality Drama Series	Betty Thomas	Won
