= James Cane =

James Cane may refer to:

- Jame Cane (politician) for Ratoath (Parliament of Ireland constituency)
- James Cane (art director) on List of awards and nominations received by Hill Street Blues

== See also ==
- James Cayne, businessman
- James Cain (disambiguation)
- James Caine (disambiguation)
- James Caan (disambiguation)
- James Kane (disambiguation)
