= Andrew Arthur =

Andrew or Andy Arthur may refer to:

- Andrew Arthur (brigadier); see List of Australian generals and brigadiers
- Andy Arthur (actor), appeared in "Hill Street Station", the first episode of Hill Street Blues
