= James Cain =

James or Jim Cain may refer to:

- James H. Cain (1866–1940), Methodist minister in Melbourne, Australia
- James M. Cain (1892–1977), American journalist and novelist
- James P. Cain (born 1957), politically appointed American diplomat
- Jim Cain (defensive end) (1927–2001), American player of gridiron football
- Jim Cain (tackle) (born 1939), Canadian football player
- Jim Cain (ice hockey) (1902–1962), Canadian ice hockey player
- James Cain (Isle of Man politician) (1927–2019), Manx Speaker of the House of Keys
- James D. Cain Jr. (born 1964), United States federal judge
- J. V. Cain (1951–1979), tight end

== See also ==
- James Caine (disambiguation)
- James Caan (disambiguation)
- James Cane (disambiguation)
- Jim Kane (disambiguation)
- James Cayne (born 1934), businessman
