= James Caine (disambiguation) =

James Caine (1908–1971) was an English professional footballer.

James Caine may also refer to:

- Jim Caine (jazz pianist) (1926–2018), Manx jazz pianist, radio presenter and raconteur
- James Caine, candidate in South Tyneside Council election, 2004

== See also ==
- James Cain (disambiguation)
- James Caan (disambiguation)
- James Cane (disambiguation)
- Jim Kane (disambiguation)
- James Cayne businessman
