= Battle of the Bastards =

- Game of Thrones episode
- Episode no.: Season 6 Episode 9
- Directed by: Miguel Sapochnik
- Written by: David Benioff; D. B. Weiss
- Cinematography by: Fabian Wagner
- Editing by: Tim Porter
- Original air date: June 19, 2016
- Running time: 59 minutes

Guest appearances
- Jacob Anderson as Grey Worm; Gemma Whelan as Yara Greyjoy; Ian Whyte as Wun Wun; Enzo Cilenti as Yezzan zo Qaggaz; Paul Rattray as Harald Karstark; Dean S. Jagger as Smalljon Umber; Art Parkinson as Rickon Stark; Bella Ramsey as Lyanna Mormont; George Georgiou as Razdal mo Eraz; Eddie Jackson as Belicho Paenymion

Episode chronology
← Previous "No One"	Next → "The Winds of Winter"
- Game of Thrones season 6

"Battle of the Bastards" is the ninth and penultimate episode of the sixth season of HBO's fantasy television series Game of Thrones and its 59th episode overall. It was written by series co-creators David Benioff and D. B. Weiss, and directed by Miguel Sapochnik.

The episode's main plot focuses on the eponymous battle at Winterfell between the combined forces of House Bolton, Umber and Karstark, led by Ramsay Bolton, and the combined forces of the free folk and the loyal houses of the North (Mormont, Mazin, Hornwood, and several more which are not mentioned), led by Jon Snow. Additionally, in Mereen, Daenerys Targaryen burns the Masters of Slavers' Bay and their fleet and Yara Greyjoy offers her fleet and fealty to Daenerys.

"Battle of the Bastards" received immense critical acclaim, with several reviewers calling it a "masterpiece", and being praised as one of the series' best episodes as well as one of the greatest television episodes of all time. Critics described the battle in the North as "terrifying, gripping and exhilarating", while Harington's and Rheon's performance received high praise, and Daenerys' reunion with her dragons at the beginning of the episode was deemed "thrilling". The eponymous battle took 25 days to film and required 500 extras, 600 crew members, and 70 horses. In the United States, the episode had a viewership of 7.66 million in its initial broadcast. It won the Emmy Awards for Outstanding Directing and Outstanding Writing; the episode was Kit Harington's choice to support his nomination for Outstanding Supporting Actor. Sapochnik also won the Directors Guild of America Award for Outstanding Directing in a Drama Series for the episode.

This episode marks the final appearances of Art Parkinson (Rickon Stark) and Iwan Rheon (Ramsay Bolton).

== Plot ==
=== In Meereen ===
Daenerys, Tyrion, Missandei, and Grey Worm meet the Masters, who offer terms of surrender. Daenerys counters that the meeting was called to discuss the masters' surrender. Daenerys rides Drogon into Slaver's Bay with Rhaegal and Viserion to burn their fleet. Grey Worm kills two masters, sparing Yezzan; Tyrion tells him to warn the other masters of Daenerys' power. Meanwhile, Daario and the Dothraki slaughter the Sons of the Harpy.

Theon and Yara arrive in Meereen to ally with Daenerys. They offer their fleet, and renouncement of the reaver lifestyle, for Daenerys' help overthrowing Euron and recognition of Yara's claim to the Iron Islands.

=== At Winterfell ===
Jon, Sansa, Tormund and Davos meet with Ramsay and his bannermen. Jon refuses Ramsay's offer to exchange Sansa for a pardon, and Ramsay declines Jon's offer to settle the dispute in single combat, knowing he has 6,000 men versus the Starks' 2,400. (Note: "The Broken Man": Davos Seaworth "2,000 Wildlings, 200 Hornwoods, 143 Mazins…" Sansa Stark "… 62 Mormonts.") Sansa assures Ramsay that he will die the next day. Ramsay gloats that he has starved his hounds in anticipation of feeding Jon and his advisors to them.

At camp, Sansa insists the Starks' army is too small and warns Jon not to underestimate Ramsay. Davos and Tormund discuss Stannis and Mance and acknowledge they may have previously served the wrong men. Davos discovers where Shireen was burned, and realizes she was killed by Melisandre.

The armies gather outside Winterfell the next morning. Ramsay releases Rickon and has him run to Jon while shooting arrows at him. When Rickon is killed, an enraged Jon charges Ramsay's army, and the battle begins, leaving many dead and creating a wall of corpses. This wall allows the Bolton infantry to kettle the Stark forces while Smalljon prevents escape. Jon survives a trampling, but the Stark forces appear doomed. Suddenly a horn sounds in the distance, as the Knights of the Vale arrive led by Littlefinger and Sansa. They smash the Bolton army, bringing victory to the Starks, while Tormund kills Smalljon in the chaos.

Ramsay retreats to Winterfell and orders the gates closed. After the giant Wun Wun destroys the gates and Stark loyalists overwhelm the garrison, Ramsay shoots Wun Wun in the eye with an arrow, killing him. Jon overpowers and beats Ramsay, but stops short of killing him upon seeing Sansa. Jon orders Ramsay imprisoned, and Winterfell returns to House Stark.

Later, Sansa visits Ramsay, imprisoned in the kennels with his hounds. Sansa tells Ramsay that House Bolton will die with him, as he is the last male heir. Ramsay insists that his hounds will not turn on him, but Sansa reminds him that he has starved them. The hounds close in on a bloodied Ramsay as he slowly becomes horrified, and then devour him. Sansa walks away, smirking in satisfaction.

== Production ==
=== Writing ===
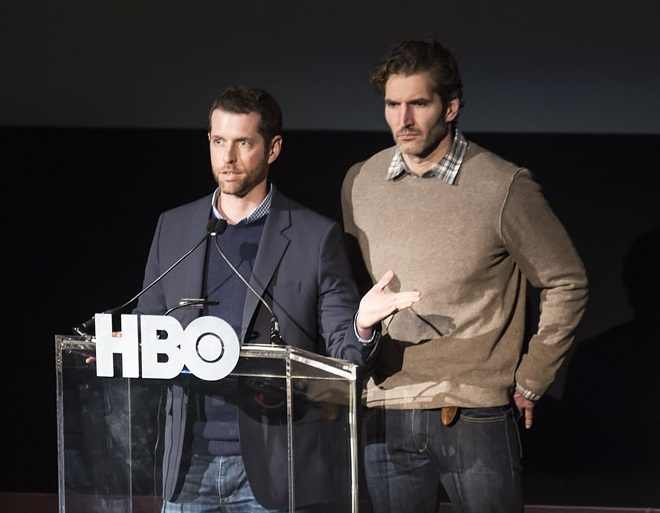
The episode was written by series co-creators David Benioff and D. B. Weiss.

"Battle of the Bastards" was written by the series' creators, David Benioff and D. B. Weiss. Elements of the episode are based on the sixth novel in the A Song of Ice and Fire series, The Winds of Winter, which author George R. R. Martin hoped to complete before the sixth season aired. In an "Inside the Episode" segment published by HBO shortly after the episode aired, Benioff and Weiss said that the final battle was primarily inspired by the Battle of Cannae and the American Civil War. (Note: In the Battle of Cannae, the army of Carthage defeated a much-larger army from the Roman Republic led by Lucius Aemilius Paullus and Gaius Terentius Varro.) According to Weiss, "We went back to the Roman fight against the Carthaginians in the Battle of Cannae where the Romans got caught in an encirclement by Hannibal and just slaughtered to the man. We used that as our model". Benioff said, "The 'Battle of the Bastards' becomes incredibly compact. All these men, all these combatants, crammed into this incredibly tight space on the battlefield. You read accounts of the battles in the Civil War where the bodies were piled so thick it was actually an obstruction on the battlefield". Episode director Miguel Sapochnik said in an interview that the Battle of Agincourt was the original inspiration but the concept was adapted to fit budgetary constraints.

Weiss said that they wanted to depict a full-fledged battle, "From the beginning we knew that one thing we'd never had on the show was a true medieval pitched battle where two sides bring all the forces they can into play in some battlefield that's somehow negotiated or agreed upon and they go at each other until one of them wins and the other one loses. This is a staple of human history, and we started to look through film samples of it. There really wasn't one that both made you feel what it was like to be there on the ground and gave you a sense of the geography of the battle." According to Benioff, they also wanted to demonstrate the role luck plays in battle, "Just to feel the kind of randomness of it where there's arrows falling from everywhere, people are getting killed, people are getting trampled by horses, and so much of it is just luck. Jon Snow is a very skilled combatant, but part of the reason he survives this battle is just he gets lucky".

In the "Inside the Episode" featurette Benioff said about Daenerys Targaryen's transformation during the series, "I think Dany's been becoming a Targaryen ever since the beginning of Season 1". According to Weiss, "She's not her father and she's not insane and she's not a sadist, but there's a Targaryen ruthlessness that comes with even the good Targaryens". Benioff concluded, "If you're one of the lords of Westeros or one of her potential opponents in the wars to come and you get word of what happened here in Meereen, you have to be pretty nervous because this is an unprecedented threat. You've got a woman who has somehow formed an alliance where she has a Dothraki horde, a legion of Unsullied, she's got the mercenary army of the Second Sons, and she has three dragons who are now pretty close to full grown. So if she can make it all the way across the Narrow Sea and get to Westeros, who's going to stand in her way?"

=== Casting ===
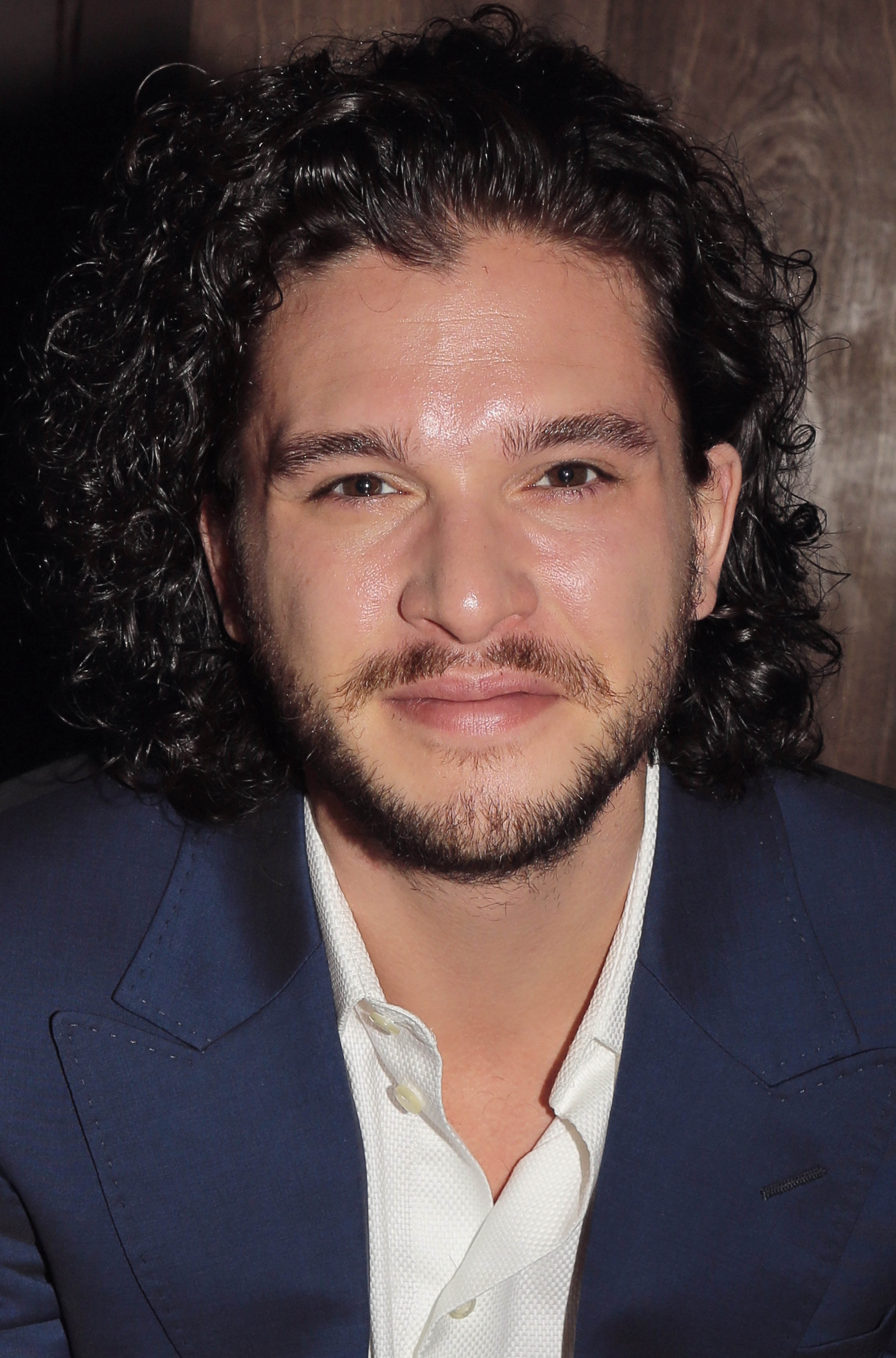
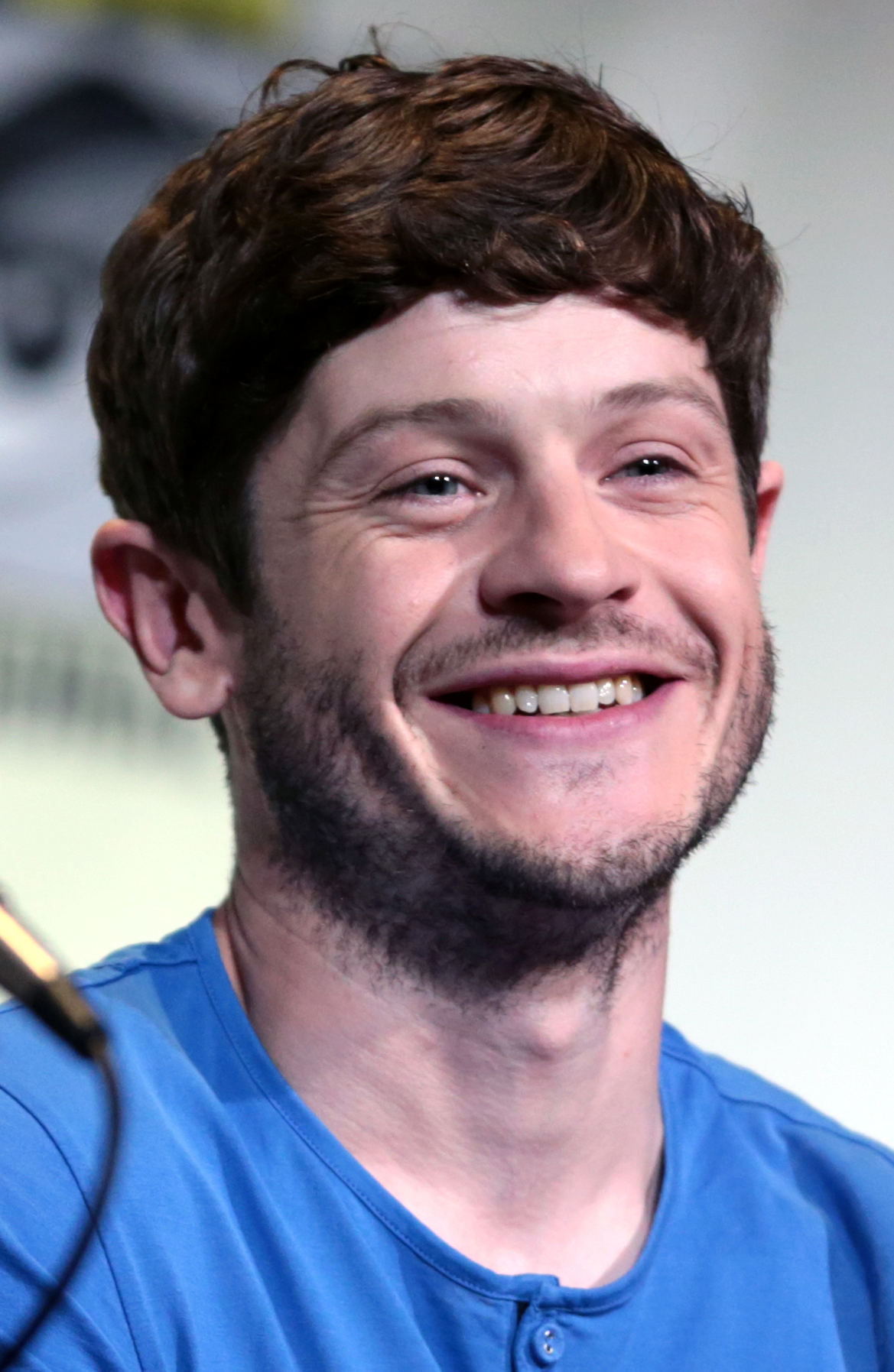
Iwan Rheon (right) played Ramsay Bolton since the third season but originally auditioned for Jon Snow, played by Kit Harington (left). "Battle of the Bastards" contained their only shared scenes in the series.

"Battle of the Bastards" was the final episode for actor Iwan Rheon, who had played Ramsay Bolton since Game of Thrones' third season. His first appearance was in "Dark Wings, Dark Words", as a then-unnamed "boy" who helps a captured Theon Greyjoy. Before he was cast as Ramsay, Rheon auditioned for the role of Jon Snow. In an interview, he described learning about his character's fate: "I had received half the scripts, five episodes, then I got the call. They joked, 'Isn't it great Ramsay ends up on the Iron Throne?' As soon as they said that I said, 'He's dead, isn't he?' It's cool. I've had four lovely seasons here. It's been great to be involved with such an amazing show. I think it's kind of right he goes down. Because what else is he going to do after this? He's done so many things. It's justified and it's the right thing to do. It's the right path. He's reached his peak. It's nice for the audience that he goes out on this high, if you will." In that interview, Kit Harington talked about Rheon: "I love Iwan's work. He's an incredibly detailed actor who's created a character who's remarkable and despicable."

"Battle of the Bastards" was also the last episode for recurring character Rickon Stark (Art Parkinson), who had appeared since the series premiere episode "Winter Is Coming". In an IGN interview, Parkinson said that he was tipped off about his character's death: "Whenever I was told that I was coming back for Season 6, before they sent me through the scripts and stuff, they sent me through a ring just to say, 'Listen, so that you don't get a shock whenever you read the scripts, just know that you die this season.'" He continued, "Whenever I came back, I was excited to come back, and the scenes all seemed pretty amazing. I was so happy to re-embrace the character." According to Parkinson, he was sorry that Rickon would die but his manner of death was a compensation: "It was a cool death, and it was always going to be a good death, so at the same time, I was pretty happy."

Another character departure was Smalljon Umber, played by Dean S. Jagger. In an interview, Jagger talked about his casting: "I prayed for it. When I heard I got the part my knees buckled. It was a life-changing moment." Before becoming a professional actor, Jagger dug trenches and worked at a mattress factory to pay his way through acting school and was a professional rollerblader. Ian Whyte also made his last appearance in "Battle of the Bastards" as the giant, Wun Wun; he had played Gregor Clegane during the show's second season. Special-effects supervisor Joe Bauer said about Whyte's casting as Wun Wun, "We wanted a large performer because somebody who would be 14, 15 feet tall would have more weight and mass to move around, and a person who's a normal size would have a very difficult time pulling that off".

=== Filming ===
==== Battle of Winterfell ====
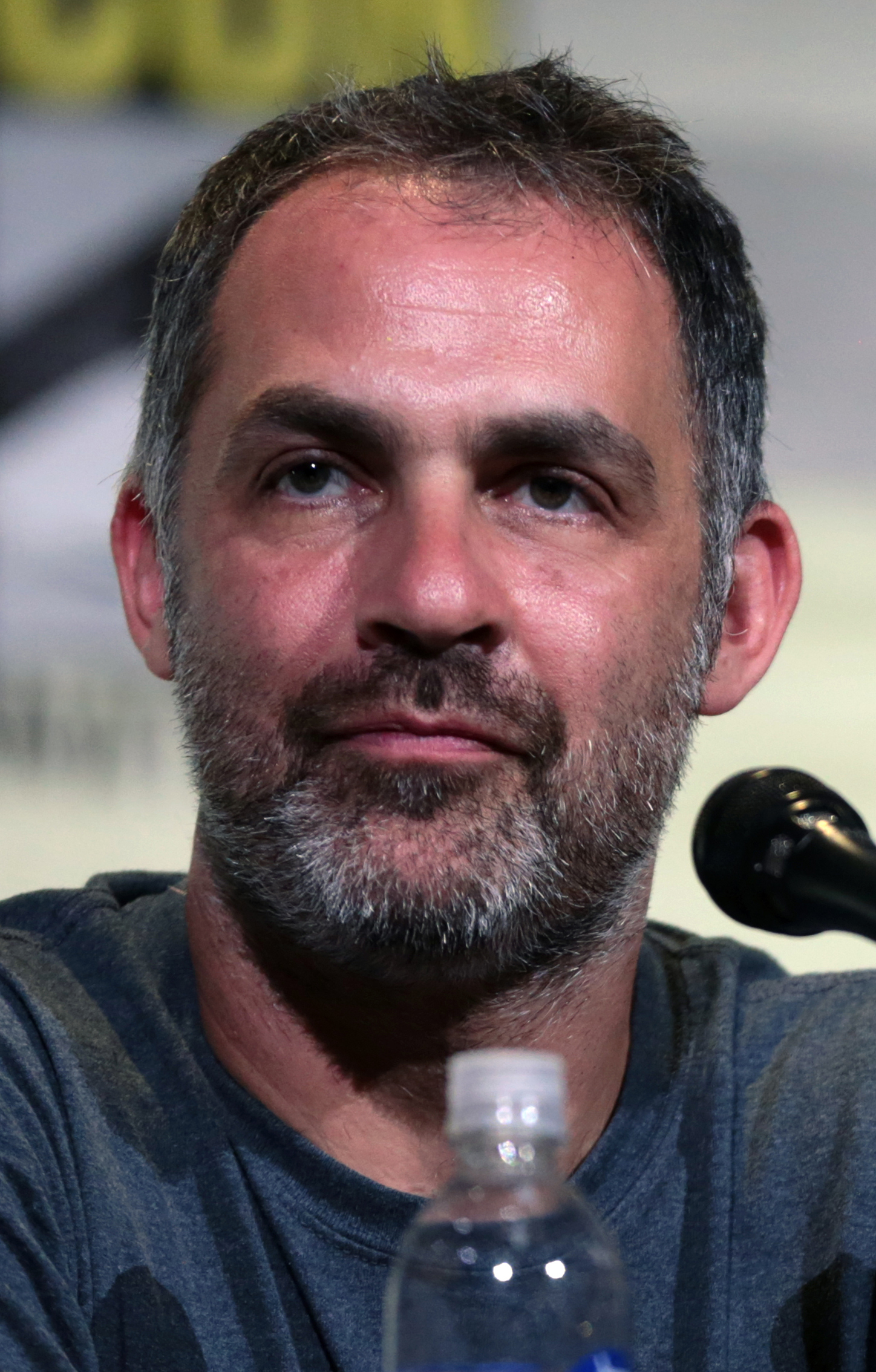
Miguel Sapochnik directed the episode, his third of the series.

"Battle of the Bastards" was directed by Miguel Sapochnik, who had directed the fifth-season episodes "The Gift" and "Hardhome". In an Entertainment Weekly interview before the episode aired, Sapochnik said he was brought on board by Benioff and Weiss after his previous-season success; "Hardhome" won several awards, including Primetime Creative Arts Emmy Awards. About how the episode should be shot, he said: "Every battle on Thrones is unique. I think that's why Benioff and Weiss keep doing them. In the case of 'Battle of the Bastards' – or 'BOB' as we affectionately called it in production – David and Dan wanted to do a thing of spectacle, a strategic pitchfield battle they hadn't had the resources to do back in season 1 or 2. I was particularly interested in depicting both the horror of war and the role of luck in battle." Benioff called Sapochnik's work on the episode some of the best in the series' history.

It took 25 days to film, requiring 500 extras, 600 crew members and 70 horses. Benioff described the difficulty of coordinating horses in battle scenes, which is why they are rarely used except in "big budget war films". Weiss added, "Miguel's really outdone himself. Fully fleshed out medieval battles require a tremendous amount of resources and choreography to get them right. It feels like we're doing something fresh that you don't see on TV and movies very often." Four camera crews were used for the battle scene. The 500 extras were largely the Snow and Bolton armies as Wildlings, archers, swordsmen and spearmen. Each army was trained separately to create off-screen rivalry between the two groups, and visual effects were used to expand the army to thousands. Kristofer Hivju, who plays Tormund Giantsbane, said about the intensity of filming the scenes: "It was pretty intense, actually. When you have 20 people running around getting squeezed together, and you're trying to chop at another bearded guy with a sword, you are not out of danger. You're laying down in the mud, and one wrong step, you won't have a face anymore. It was very intense, and Miguel insisted on making it that muddy and messy. War is not beautiful. Sometimes you see action sequences where battles seem organized. I know that from how the Vikings fought. It's not beautiful. It's hard. It's hard work. We had to shoot moment-to-moment, chronologically. We would shoot one sequence 80 times per day."

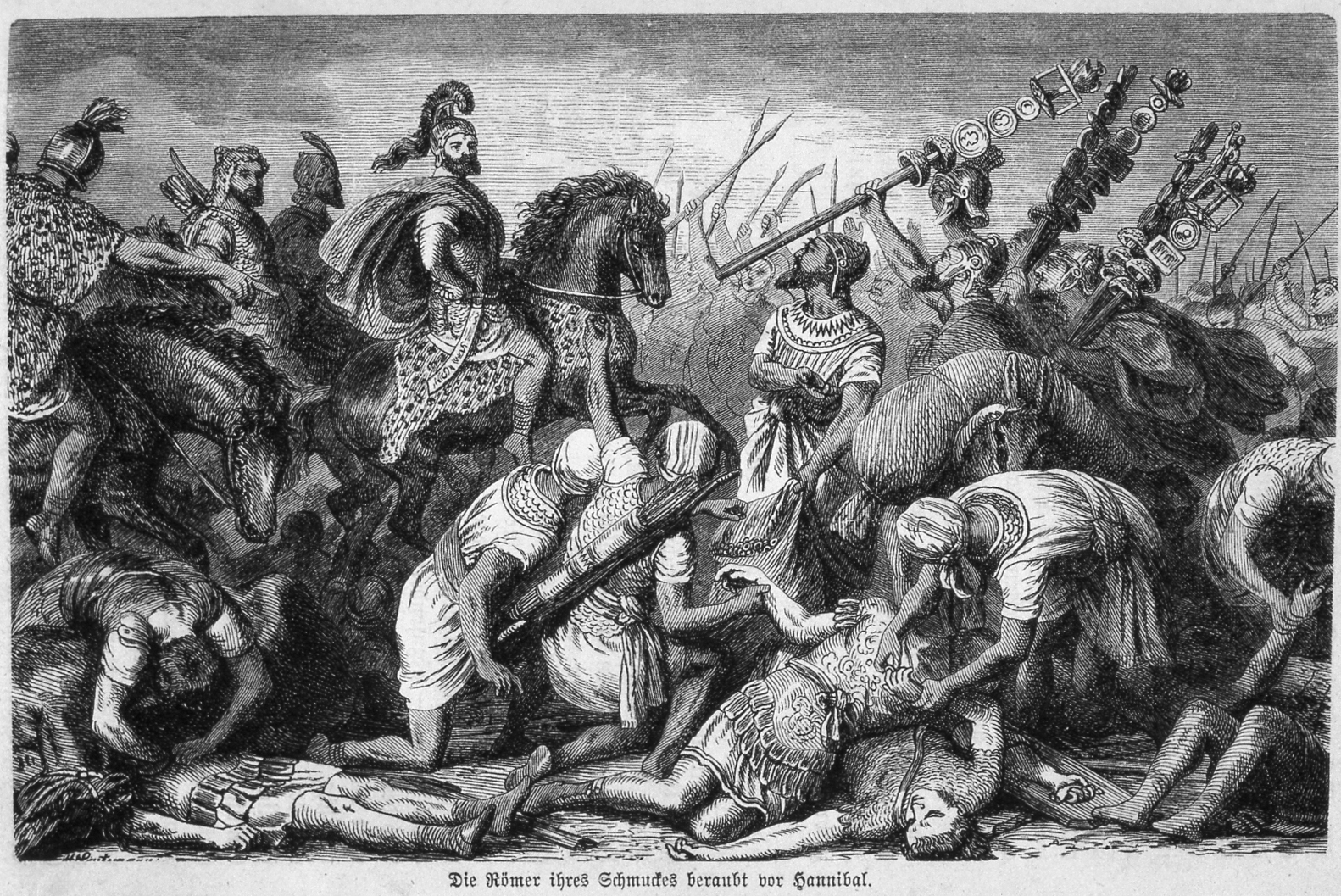
The Battle of Cannae, in the Second Punic War, was an inspiration for "Battle of the Bastards".

In an interview after the episode aired, Sapochnik detailed the process of filming the battle and called Akira Kurosawa's Ran an inspiration in shooting the scenes: "I watched every pitch field battle I could find (footage of real ones too), looking for patterns — for what works, what doesn't, what takes you out of the moment, what keeps you locked in. Interestingly one of the things I noticed is that staging of these battles through the years has changed dramatically. Back in the day you'd see these huge aerial shots of horse charges and there were two big differences. First, it was all real — no CGI or digital replication. And second, often when the horses would go down, you can kind of tell they got really hurt. Nowadays you'd never get away with that, and nor would you want to."

Asked about the greatest challenge in filming the battle, Sapochnik said: "Every time we charge the horses it takes 25 minutes to reset all the fake snow on the field and rub out the horseshoe prints. So how many times can we afford to charge the horses each day knowing we need to give time for a reset that's 10 times longer than the actual shot? Another thing was how to make 500 extras look like 8,000 when you are shooting in a field where there's just nowhere to hide your shortfall. It becomes a bit like a bonkers math equation. And finally: How do you get these guys riled up enough to run at each other and get covered in mud and stand in the rain and then run at each other again and again for 25 days, 10 hours a day, without them just telling you to piss off?" In an interview, he said that the single most difficult thing he was asked to depict was "having 3,000 horses running at each other, especially after we discovered that horses cannot touch each other. It's illegal — it's a very valid rule about protecting the horses. So the very thing we were trying to do was not allowed. And we only had 70 horses ... [The solution was] you would have one guy run into the frame, and then the horse rider would pull the horse, which means make the horse fall and lie down on its side. Later we would digitally superimpose another C.G.I. horse and make it seem like it had impacted the live one."

According to the director, the scene was filmed on privately owned land in Saintfield, Northern Ireland, and they had only 12 days to shoot. After reading the script Sapochnik came up with a 48-day shooting schedule, which was whittled down to 25 days. The CGI of Ghost, Jon Snow's direwolf, in the episode presented difficulties; he was "in there in spades originally, but it's also an incredibly time consuming and expensive character to bring to life. Ultimately we had to choose between Wun Wun and the direwolf, so the dog bit the dust." Sapochnik said that a crucial scene was filmed off-script. After three days of rain, unable to finish filming as scripted, he suggested a scene in which Jon Snow was trampled and nearly buried alive by bodies; the director described the character pushing his way out as "rebirthing."

Kit Harington compared the "rebirthing" scene to the conclusion of the third-season episode, "Mhysa", with Daenerys Targaryen.

In an interview about the "rebirthing" scene, Kit Harington said that it intended to mirror the Daenerys Targaryen scene at the end of the third-season episode "Mhysa" when Daenerys is held up by freed Yunkai slaves; in "Battle of the Bastards", Jon Snow emerges from the crushing crowd of the battle: "When the crush starts happening, he slows down, and there's that thing of peace where he thinks: 'I could just stay here and let it all end.' And then something drives him to fight up, and that moment when he comes up and grasps for breath, he is reborn again, which I found weirdly reflective of the scene where Dany is held aloft at the end of season three."

"Battle of the Bastards" was the first episode in which Kit Harington and Iwan Rheon filmed scenes together and met on-screen. Rheon said that he had always wanted to film scenes with Jon Snow: "Anyone who has asked me, 'Who would you like Ramsay to meet?' My answer has always been, 'Jon Snow.' He's the antithesis of Ramsay. They're almost a yin and a yang. They both come from such a similar place yet they're so different. And even though they're enemies, they've both risen so far as bastards, which is almost incomprehensible, and now they're both here facing each other. They couldn't be any more different, yet more similar." In an interview, Harington talked about his fight scene with Rheon: "I actually did punch Iwan in the face twice by accident, which he took really well. He was really nice about it." According to Rheon, "The way I see it, if you don't get hit a couple of times doing that, you're not doing it properly."

A notable goof occurred during the scene where Jon Snow mounts his horse in an attempt to rescue Rickon before Ramsay's arrows can reach him. As he is climbing into the saddle, Snow's Valyrian sword Longclaw and its scabbard can be seen bending wildly, betraying its status as a rubber stand-in.

==== Battle of Meereen ====
For the Daenerys scene at the beginning of the episode where the three dragons burn part of the Masters' fleet, Sapochnik credited VFX supervisor Joe Bauer and producer Steve Kullback for post-production work: "For this sequence David and Dan said that what they wanted to see was a 'demonstration' of what's to come. So I tried to approach it in the most elegant, epic, big-movie way I could." The director tried to design the shots with relative realism, inspired by footage of World War II Supermarine Spitfires in action. He based the dragon shots on wildlife footage, allowing them to break the frame: "These things should be so big and fast it's hard to keep up with them." To insert Emilia Clarke (as Daenerys Targaryen) into the scene, she rode a "multi-directional, computer-controlled hydraulic gimbal device shaped like the upper shoulders of the dragon"; Clarke was filmed separately in Belfast, Northern Ireland.

"Battle of the Bastards" featured the first meeting of Daenerys Targaryen and Yara and Theon Greyjoy, and Yara's first meeting with Tyrion Lannister. Gemma Whelan, who plays Yara, talked about filming the scene: "Oh my goodness – I was so excited when I saw that I had a scene with those two [Daenerys and Tyrion]." About the dynamic between the two women, Whelan said: "It's clear as the scene plays out that Yara quite likes Dany. We share a lot of little looks and there's some playful language in how we talk to one another – Dany asks if the Iron Islands ever had a queen, and Yara says, 'No more than Westeros.' They recognize the girl-power undertow between the two of them."

== Reception ==
=== Ratings ===
Game of Thrones just gave us everything we wanted.

Not merely the obvious — Sansa letting slip the dogs of war to turn her sadistic tormenter and the show's biggest villain into kibbles and bits — but everything else was pitch-perfect thrilling, too. We wanted a massive battle that's unlike anything we've seen before, and we got it. We wanted to see Dany's three dragons fighting an enemy all at once. We wanted Theon and Yara to meet Dany and form an alliance. We wanted to see resurrected Jon Snow in action-hero mode. We wanted Davos to get a clue about Shireen. We wanted Jon and Ramsay to have an actual conversation — and for them to fight one on one. We wanted the Starks to reclaim their home. And of course, yes, we wanted comeuppance for Ramsay and sweet revenge for Sansa.

Sure, there was tragedy in "Battle of the Bastards" too — Rickon, Wun-Wun. But can we be honest with ourselves? On some level, we wanted that, too. We don't want a huge climactic episode 9 battle without any loss. That would not be war, and that would not be Game of Thrones.

— James Hibberd in Entertainment Weekly

"Battle of the Bastards" was watched by 7.66 million American households in its initial telecast on HBO, slightly more than the previous week's rating (7.60 million viewers) for "No One". The episode competed with game seven of the 2016 NBA Finals. It had a 3.9 rating in the 18–49 demographic, the highest-rated show on cable television that night. In the United Kingdom, the episode was seen by 2.450 million viewers on Sky Atlantic (the channel's highest-rated broadcast that week) and had 0.118 million timeshift viewers.

=== Critical reception ===
"Battle of the Bastards" received immense critical acclaim, with many calling it one of the best television episodes of all time. Critics cited the size and scope of the battle in the North and Daenerys's scene with her dragons at the beginning of the episode. It has a 98% rating on the review aggregator website Rotten Tomatoes from 65 reviews, with an average score of 9.08 out of 10. According to the site consensus, "'Battle of the Bastards' delivered one of the greatest battle sequences in the show's history, and some savagely satisfying vengeance as well."

IGN's Matt Fowler gave the episode a 10 out of 10, writing in his review, "At this point, it seems like the pattern when it comes to the ninth episode of a given season of Game of Thrones is tragic death, amazing battle, tragic death, amazing battle, and so on. And this being Season 6, it was time to land on a phenomenal clash of swords and shields — and 'Battle of the Bastards' certainly delivered." He continued, "Game of Thrones did not disappoint when it came to this season's great northern battle, as Jon and Sansa's differences were spectacularly highlighted in a savagely strong war chapter that saw House Stark overcome huge odds to reclaim their home. Plus, Daenerys got to soar, as her dragons quickly stopped a violent siege with fury and fire." Jeremy Egner of The New York Times also praised the episode: "As directed by Miguel Sapochnik, who also oversaw last season's terrific 'Hardhome' episode, the lengthy sequence was terrifying, gripping and exhilarating, sometimes all at once, a sweeping display of all the different ways one can die on the battlefield." Egner called Ramsay's death an episode highlight ("Ramsay Bolton's demise was arguably the most eagerly anticipated death ever on Game of Thrones and the show handled it with flair, dispatching him in a poetic, canine-fueled fashion that was no less satisfying for being telegraphed early on"), and concluded about Daenerys's scene: "Daenerys Stormborn had a few words for the slave masters who launched their attack last week. Those words included 'surrender or die' and 'thanks for the ships', as we saw another thrilling action sequence that I believe reunited the dragon triplets for the first time since they were quite young." Myles McNutt of The A.V. Club wrote in his review, "This battle works as a climactic moment for Game of Thrones as a cultural event, selling us on the scale and ambition of the producers and their production teams, all who should be commended for the accomplishments from a technical perspective." According to James Hibberd of Entertainment Weekly, "Was this the show's best episode? It's hard to immediately process that question. Maybe? Probably. It's almost certainly the most exciting hour and had the most jaw-dropping battle sequence we've seen yet on TV."

Ed Power of The Daily Telegraph discussed the episode's refreshing strong-women theme: "Game of Thrones has been justly criticised for employing young actresses as wobbly-wobbly window dressing and, though the toplessness has been dialed back this season, it's still very much a calling card. However there are reasons for suspecting that the series is attempting to make amends — by arguing that Westeros would be far better off with women in charge. Even as Sansa was turning the tide at Winterfell, in Meereen, Daenerys and Yara Greyjoy were striking up a lady bromance — and seemingly rock-solid alliance — for the ages." Laura Prudom of Variety agreed: "After seasons of criticism over the show's misogyny (sometimes earned, sometimes not), it's thrilling to see an episode like 'Battle of the Bastards', where women like Dany, Sansa and Yara — and emasculated men (either figuratively or literally) like Tyrion and Theon — break the gears of war and the familiar patterns of violence by attempting to 'leave the world better than we found it', despite the examples set by the evil men who came before them." According to Sarah Larson of The New Yorker, "Sansa watches calmly, then smiles. You've come a long way, baby. Or she's become a monster, and so have I. The women of Westeros are on the warpath."

=== Accolades ===
The episode received a record six Primetime Emmy Awards, including awards for writing and direction. "Battle of the Bastards" has been nominated for 32 awards and has won 19.

Year	Award	Category	Nominee(s)	Result	Ref.
2016	Primetime Emmy Awards	Outstanding Supporting Actor in a Drama Series	Kit Harington as Jon Snow	Nominated	
2016	Primetime Emmy Awards	Outstanding Directing for a Drama Series	Miguel Sapochnik	Won	
2016	Primetime Emmy Awards	Outstanding Writing for a Drama Series	David Benioff and D. B. Weiss	Won	
2016	Primetime Creative Arts Emmy Awards	Outstanding Make-up for a Single-Camera Series (Non-Prosthetic)	Jane Walker, Kate Thompson, Nicola Mathews, Kay Bilk, Marianna Kyriacou, Pamela Smyth	Won	
2016	Primetime Creative Arts Emmy Awards	Outstanding Single-Camera Picture Editing for a Drama series	Tim Porter	Won	
2016	Primetime Creative Arts Emmy Awards	Outstanding Sound Mixing for a Series	Ronan Hill, Richard Dyer, Onnalee Blank, Mathew Waters	Won	
2016	Primetime Creative Arts Emmy Awards	Outstanding Special Visual Effects	Steve Kullback, Joe Bauer, Adam Chazen, Derek Spears, Eric Carney, Sam Conway, Matthew Rouleau, Michelle Blok, Glenn Melenhorst	Won	
2016	Gold Derby Awards	Best Drama Episode		Nominated	
2016	Australian Production Design Guild	3D Award for Visual Effects Design	Iloura	Won	
2016	British Society of Cinematographers	ACO/BSC/GBCT Operators TV Drama Award	Sean Savage, David Morgan & John Ferguson	Nominated	
2016	Hollywood Professional Alliance	Outstanding Sound	Tim Kimmel, Paula Fairfield, Mathew Waters, Onnalee Blank, Bradley Katona, Paul Bercovitch	Nominated	
2016	Hollywood Professional Alliance	Outstanding Editing	Tim Porter	Won	
2016	Hollywood Professional Alliance	Outstanding Visual Effects	Joe Bauer, Eric Carney, Derek Spears, Glenn Melenhorst, Matthew Rouleau	Won	
2016	American Society of Cinematographers	Outstanding Achievement in Cinematography in Regular Series	Fabian Wagner	Won	
2017	Annie Awards	Outstanding Achievement, Character Animation in a Live Action Production	Nicholas Tripodi, Dean Elliott, James Hollingworth, Matt Weaver	Nominated	
2017	American Cinema Editors Awards	Best Edited One-Hour Series For Non-Commercial Television	Tim Porter	Won	
2017	Visual Effects Society Awards	Outstanding Visual Effects in a Photoreal Episode	Joe Bauer, Steve Kullback, Glenn Melenhorst, Matthew Rouleau, Sam Conway	Won	
2017	Visual Effects Society Awards	Outstanding Animated Performance in an Episode or Real-Time Project	James Kinnings, Michael Holzl, Matt Derksen, Joseph Hoback – Drogon	Won	
2017	Visual Effects Society Awards	Outstanding Created Environment in an Episode, Commercial or Real-Time Project	Deak Ferrand, Dominic Daigle, François Croteau, Alexandru Banuta – Meereen City	Won	
2017	Visual Effects Society Awards	Outstanding Virtual Cinematography in a Photoreal Project	Patrick Tiberius Gehlen, Michelle Blok, Christopher Baird, Drew Wood-Davies	Nominated	
2017	Visual Effects Society Awards	Outstanding Effects Simulations in an Episode, Commercial, or Real-Time Project	Kevin Blom, Sasmit Ranadive, Wanghua Huang, Ben Andersen	Nominated	
2017	Visual Effects Society Awards	Outstanding Effects Simulations in an Episode, Commercial, or Real-Time Project	Thomas Hullin, Dominik Kirouac, James Dong, Xavier Fourmond – Meereen City	Won	
2017	Visual Effects Society Awards	Outstanding Effects Simulations in an Episode, Commercial, or Real-Time Project	Thomas Montminy-Brodeur, Patrick David, Michael Crane, Joe Salazar - Meereen City	Nominated	
2017	Visual Effects Society Awards	Outstanding Effects Simulations in an Episode, Commercial, or Real-Time Project	Dominic Hellier, Morgan Jones, Thijs Noij, Caleb Thompson – Retaking Winterfell	Won	
2017	Cinema Audio Society Awards	Outstanding Achievement in Sound Mixing – Television Series – One Hour	Ronan Hill, Onnalee Blank, Mathew Waters, Richard Dyer, Brett Voss	Won	
2017	Directors Guild of America Awards	Dramatic Series	Miguel Sapochnik	Won	
2017	Golden Reel Awards	Best Sound Editing in Television, Short Form: FX/Foley	Tim Kimmel, Brett Voss, John Matter, Jeffrey Wilhoit, Dylan Wilhoit, Paula Fairfield and Bradley Katona	Nominated	
2017	Golden Reel Awards	Best Sound Editing in Television, Short Form: Dialogue / ADR	Tim Kimmel and Tim Hands	Nominated	
2017	Golden Reel Awards	Best Sound Editing in Television, Short Form: Music	David Klotz	Nominated	
2017	Hugo Award	Best Dramatic Presentation, Short Form	David Benioff (writer), D. B. Weiss (writer), and Miguel Sapochnik (director)	Nominated	
2017	Webby Award	Unscripted (Branded)	Episode Featurette	Won	
2017	British Academy Television Awards	Must-See Moment		Nominated	
