= Tim Porter =

British television editor

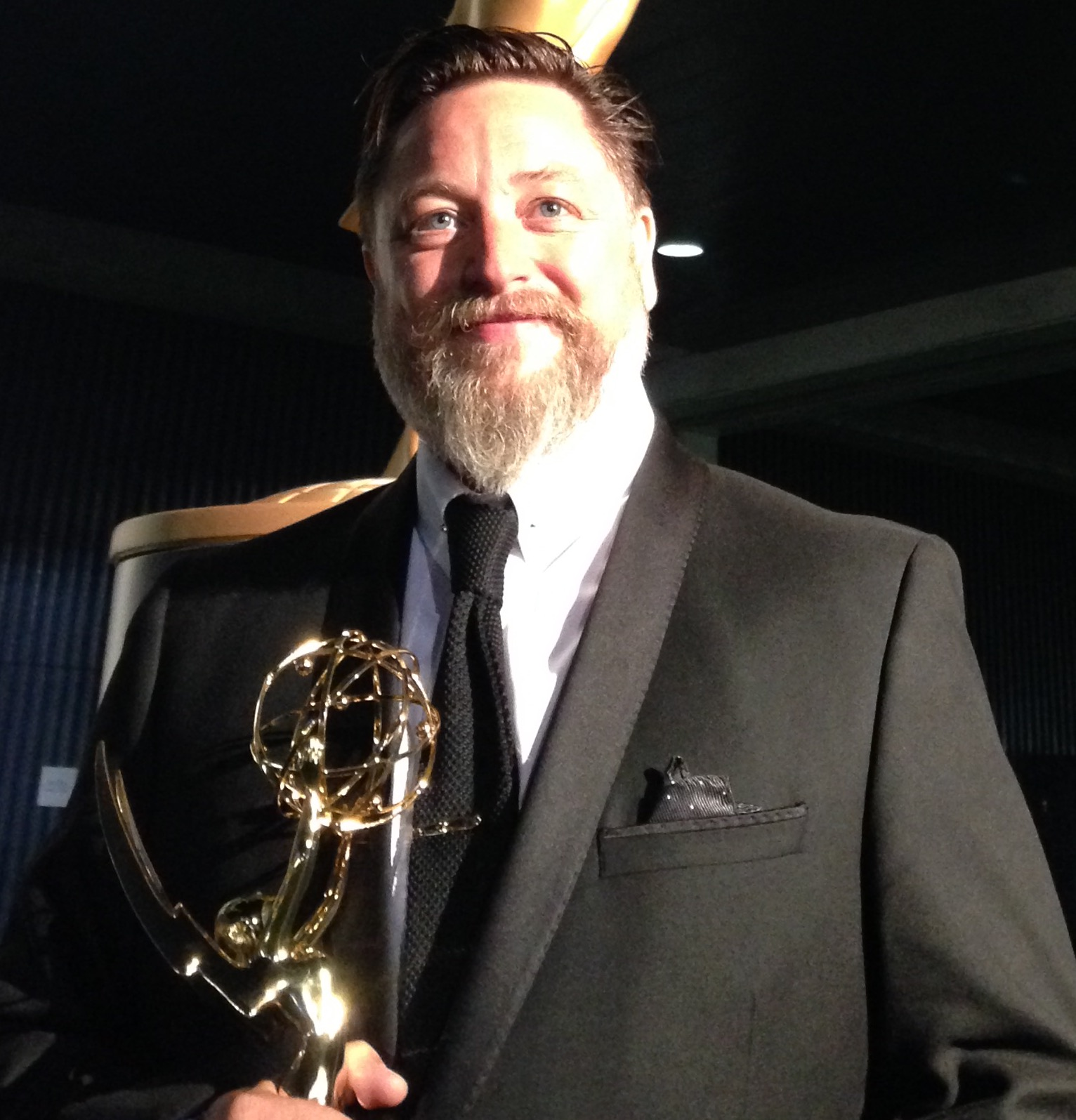
- Porter in 2016
- Born: May 1974 (age 51)
- Occupation: Television editor
- Known for: Work on Game of Thrones

Tim Porter (born May 1974) is a British film editor, best known for his work on the HBO series, Game of Thrones, as well as several other notable British television series. He worked as an editor and co-producer on the Game of Thrones prequel, House of the Dragon.

== Career ==
He won the 2016 Emmy for "Battle of the Bastards", directed by Miguel Sapochnik. He 'sifted through nearly 100 hours of footage to create a seamless battle scene.' He was also given both the 2016 HPA and Eddie awards.

In 2019, he won his second Emmy award (Outstanding Single-Camera Picture Editing for A Drama Series) for Game of Thrones "The Long Night", (season 8, episode 3). The episode was directed again by Sapochnik. Porter describes it as "a constant search for the correct rhythm." He was awarded the American Cinema Editors 2020 Eddie for that same episode.

He was recognised in Variety's 2016 'Below The Line Impact Report' as, 'an editor capable of building suspense and excruciating drama.

He has received four Emmy and four Eddie nominations for his editing of Game of Thrones.

He is a member of American Cinema Editors.
