= James Caan (disambiguation) =

James Caan (1940–2022) was an American actor.

James Caan may also refer to:

- James Caan (businessman) (born 1960), British-Pakistani entrepreneur and television personality

== See also ==
- James Kahn, American writer and medical specialist
- James Cain (disambiguation)
- James Caine (disambiguation)
- James Kane (disambiguation)
- James Cane (disambiguation)
- James Cayne, businessman
