= James Kane =

James or Jim Kane may refer to:

- James Kane (politician) (1895–1964)
- Jim Kane (coach) (1937–2003), American high school coach.
- Jim Kane (baseball) (1881–1947), American baseball player
- Jim Kane (American football) (1896–1976), American football player

== See also ==
- James Cain (disambiguation)
- James Caine (disambiguation)
- James Caan (disambiguation)
- James Cane (disambiguation)
- James Cayne (1934–2021), businessman
