= Ken S. Polk =

American sound engineer

- Occupation: Sound engineer
- Years active: 1981–present

Ken S. Polk is an American sound engineer. He won three Primetime Emmy Awards and was nominated for eleven more in the category Outstanding Sound Mixing.

== Film credits ==
- In the Mouth of Madness (1994)
- Batman Forever (1995)
- Under Siege 2: Dark Territory (1995)
- Heat (1995)
- Grumpier Old Men (1995)
- Trial and Error (1997)
- Lethal Weapon 4 (1998)
- The Whole Nine Yards (2000)
- Around the Bend (2004)
- Crank (2006)
- Lars and the Real Girl (2007)
- The Good Night (2007)
