= Jim Cain (tackle) =

Canadian gridiron football player (born 1939)

No. 54
- Position: T

Personal information
- Born: 1939 (age 86–87); Toronto, Ontario, Canada

Career information
- College: Detroit

Career history
- 1961–1969: Ottawa Rough Riders

Awards and highlights
- Grey Cup champion - 1968, 1969

Jim Cain (born 1939) is a former Grey Cup champion Canadian Football League offensive lineman.

Cain was a graduate of the University of Detroit, returning to Canada to play for the Ottawa Rough Riders. A dependable player, who never missed a game in his 9 years, he finished his career with back-to-back Grey Cup championships.

His cousin was Brian Smith of Ottawa, a former National Hockey League goalie and popular sportscaster who was murdered in 1995.
