= Chris Willingham =

American film editor (1950–2025)

- Born: Chris G. Willingham; December 25, 1950
- Died: June 28, 2025 (aged 74); Los Angeles, California, U.S.
- Occupation: Television editor
- Spouse: Lynne Willingham (m. 1988)

Chris G. Willingham (December 25, 1950 – June 28, 2025) was an American film editor. He won three Primetime Emmy Awards and was nominated for two more in the category Outstanding Picture Editing for his work on the television program 24.

Willingham died of a heart attack on June 28, 2025, at his home in Los Angeles, California, at the age of 74.
