= Joseph Dervin =

American film editor

- Born: Joseph Thomas Dervin; November 4, 1914; Somerville, Massachusetts, U.S.
- Died: June 20, 2005 (aged 90); Calabasas, California, U.S.
- Occupation: Film editor
- Spouse: Margaret Mary Dervin (m. 1940)

Joseph Thomas Dervin (November 4, 1914 – June 20, 2005) was an American film editor. He was nominated for three Primetime Emmy Awards in the category Outstanding Picture Editing for his work on the television programs The Man from U.N.C.L.E. and Longstreet.

Dervin died on June 20, 2005, of natural causes in Calabasas, California, at the age of 90.
