= Lynne Willingham =

American television and film editor

- Born: San Francisco, California, US
- Occupation: Television editor
- Years active: 1978–present
- Spouse: Chris Willingham (m. 1988; died. 2025)
- Relatives: Steven Mirkovich, ACE (brother); Paul Mirkovich (brother)

Lynne Willingham is an American television and film editor. She is a two-time Primetime Emmy Award winner.

== Life and career ==
Willingham was born in San Francisco, California, the daughter of Natalie Chalkley Mirkovich and Joseph M. Mirkovich. She married Chris Willingham, ACE, in 1988. She attended UCLA. She is a member of American Cinema Editors (ACE). Her recent works are Ray Donovan: The Movie and American Gigolo.

== Filmography ==
Year	Title	Contribution	Note
1989-90	Booker	Editor	8 episodes
1991	Street Justice	Editor	TV series
1993-94	Cobra	Editor	11 episodes
1994-95	Hawkeye	Editor	10 episodes
1995	Deceived by Trust	Editor	TV movie
1995-96	The Commish	Editor	2 episodes
1996	The Pretender	Editor	TV series
1996	Abduction of Innocence	Editor	TV movie
1997-2002	The X-Files	Editor	36 episodes
1998	Inside the X Files	Editor	Documentary
2002	Providence	Editor	3 episodes
2003-04	The Guardian	Editor	7 episodes
2005	Revelations	Editor	5 episodes
2005	Empire	Editor	6 episodes
2005-07	Without a Trace	Editor	14 episodes
2008-09	Fear Itself	Editor	4 episodes
2008-09	Breaking Bad	Editor	9 episodes
2010	Happy Town	Editor	3 episodes
2010-12	True Blood	Editor	12 episodes
2011-13	Body of Proof	Editor	13 episodes
2013-14	Revenge	Editor	6 episodes
2013-19	Ray Donovan	Editor	22 episodes
2015	The Red Road	Editor	2 episodes
2016	Bloodline	Editor	3 episodes
2017	Claws	Editor	2 episodes
2019	The Son	Editor	4 episodes
2019	See	Editor	2 episodes
2020-21	Your Honor	Editor	4 episodes
2022	Ray Donovan: The Movie	Editor	TV movie
2022	American Gigolo	Editor	TV series

== Awards and nominations ==
Year	Result	Award	Category	Work	Ref.
1998	Nominated	Primetime Emmy Awards	Outstanding Single-Camera Picture Editing for a Drama Series	The X-Files	
1998	Nominated	American Cinema Editors	Best Edited One-Hour Series for Television	The X-Files	
2008	Won	Primetime Emmy Awards	Outstanding Single-Camera Picture Editing for a Drama Series	Breaking Bad	
2008	Nominated	Hollywood Post Alliance	Outstanding Editing - Television	Breaking Bad	
2009	Won	Primetime Emmy Awards	Outstanding Single-Camera Picture Editing for a Drama Series	Breaking Bad	
2009	Won	American Cinema Editors	Best Edited One-Hour Series for Commercial Television	Breaking Bad	
2009	Won	Hollywood Post Alliance	Outstanding Editing - Television	Breaking Bad	
2010	Won	American Cinema Editors	Best Edited One-Hour Series for Commercial Television	Breaking Bad	
