= Hill Street Station =

- Hill Street Blues episode
- Episode no.: Season 1 Episode 1
- Directed by: Robert Butler
- Written by: Michael Kozoll / Steven Bochco
- Production code: 3021
- Original air date: January 15, 1981

Guest appearances
- Panchito Gomez as Hector Ruiz; Gary Grubbs as Earps (uncredited); Gary Van Orman as Sneed; Nick Savage as bald-headed pickpocket; Jonathan Dasteel as Lamonica; Ron Godines as Contreras; Paul Michael as proprietor; Heshimu Cumbuku as pimp; Luisa Leschin as street kid; Don Cervantes as street kid; Richard Wright as killer junkie; Chris Doyle as angel dust junkie; Andy Garcia as street kid in booking; Steven Bauer as Fuentes (as Rocky Echevarria); Veronica Redd as Alena; Eleanor McCoy as Jonette; Vernon Washington as William; Andy Garcia as street kid (as Andy Arthur); Gerry Black as Det. Alf Chesley; Robert Hirschfeld as Officer Leo Schnitz; Trinidad Silva as Jesus Martinez

Episode chronology
| ← Previous — | Next → "Presidential Fever" |

"Hill Street Station" is the first episode of the first season of the American serial police drama Hill Street Blues. "Hill Street Station" originally aired in the United States on NBC on Thursday January 15, 1981, at 10:00 pm Eastern Time as part of a two-week five-episode limited-run pilot airing on Thursdays and Saturdays. The episode won numerous Primetime Emmy Awards (Directing, Writing, Sound Editing, and Cinematography), a Directors Guild of America Award, a Writers Guild of America Award, and an Edgar Award as well as Emmy Award nominations for film editing, music composition, and art direction. The episode was directed by Robert Butler and written by Michael Kozoll and Steven Bochco.

Unlike other high-profile debuts from the 1980–81 network television season that had two- and three-hour premieres, such as Dynasty and Flamingo Road, this premiere episode debuted by itself as a one-hour offering. That season, even some holdovers, such as B. J. and the Bear and Buck Rogers, had multi-hour season premieres. The main storyline involves a hostage situation that arose from an attempted armed robbery. The episode also introduces a host of unique characters. At the time of the debut, Robert McLean described the cast as a "cast of unknowns".

== Plot ==
=== Background ===
The episode introduces the audience to a precinct station and the challenges that its police officers face in a setting of urban decay in a large anonymous city. Although anonymous, the city could easily represent the South Bronx in New York City, Watts in Los Angeles, or Central District in Miami. The episode also presents the precinct's captain by demonstrating the wide variety of forces that challenge him continually, including superiors, gangs, an ex-wife, defense counsel and strongminded men. In an article published in The Miami News, Tom Jicha compares him to the title character in Barney Miller, and The New York Times's Tom Buckley compares the show to Barney Miller and Kojak. The episode's storylines take five episodes to unravel cleanly.

=== Details ===
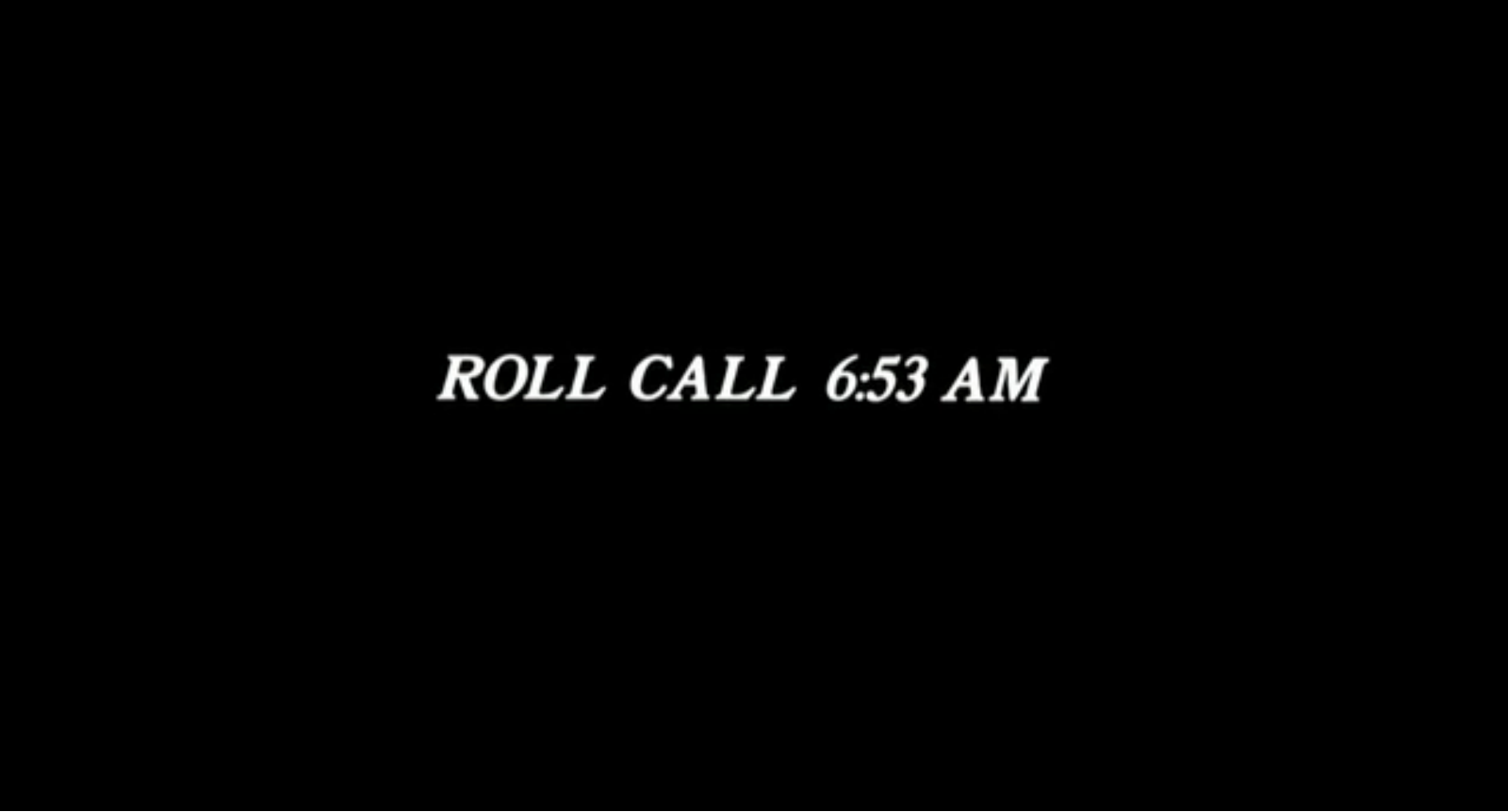
Opening seconds of the episode indicating the time of the roll call

Hill Street precinct captain Frank Furillo (Daniel J. Travanti) deals with law enforcement issues while juggling personal crises. His precinct responds to a hostage situation at a local liquor store that becomes difficult when it evolves into a media circus, complicated by an aggressive SWAT team leader, Howard Hunter (James B. Sikking), who encounters nervous young gang members. Furillo attempts to negotiate with their gang leader. His secret lover, public defender Joyce Davenport (Veronica Hamel), appears to be his nemesis as she hounds him about a client who is the lost victim of police bureaucracy. Furillo's ex-wife, Fay (Barbara Bosson), publicly demeans him in response to his bounced child-support check.

Detective J.D. LaRue (Kiel Martin) attempts to woo Davenport using less and less ethical means, eventually calling her back to the precinct to pick up her lost client even though he was never found. When she realizes his ruse, she pours a cup of hot coffee in his lap. Undercover officer Belker (Bruce Weitz) arrests a bald-headed pickpocket at the hostage situation and processes him at the precinct. Belker's proclivity for biting the ankles of perpetrators redeems itself in this episode. Desk Sergeant Phil Esterhaus (Michael Conrad) confides in Fay about his teen-age sweetheart, Cindy. When officers Hill (Michael Warren) and Renko (Charles Haid) respond to a domestic situation, their police car is stolen, and they are shot after walking into a rundown building while trying to find a phone to call in the theft.

== Production ==
=== Regular cast ===
- Captain Frank Furillo (Daniel J. Travanti)
- Joyce Davenport (Veronica Hamel)
- Sgt. Phil Esterhaus (Michael Conrad)
- Detective Mick Belker (Bruce Weitz)
- Sgt. Henry Goldblume (Joe Spano)
- Officer Andy Renko (Charles Haid)
- Officer Bobby Hill (Michael Warren)
- Sgt. Howard Hunter (James B. Sikking)
- Officer Lucille Bates (Betty Thomas)
- Detective J.D. LaRue (Kiel Martin)
- Detective Neal Washington (Taurean Blacque)
- Lt. Ray Calletano (Rene Enriquez)
- Fay Furillo (Barbara Bosson)

=== Details ===
The episode was directed by Butler and written by Kozoll and Bochco. Kozoll and Bochco previously developed Quincy, M.E., McMillan & Wife and Columbo. The pilot was produced by Mary Tyler Moore's MTM Productions, which had produced Lou Grant and The White Shadow. That season NBC was attempting to gain ground on the other two major networks (CBS and ABC) after having moved to "within striking distance" the prior year according to Brandon Tartikoff. At the time of the debut, Robert McLean described the cast as a "cast of unknowns".

The series' January 15, 1981 debut, which was announced on October 22, 1980, occurred amid the industry's recovery from the 1980 Actors strike and NBC's recovery from the 1980 Summer Olympics boycott. The show debuted on a night when both competing networks were airing reruns. Unlike other high-profile debuts from the 1980–81 network television season that had two- and three-hour premieres, such as Dynasty and Flamingo Road, this premiere episode debuted by itself as a one-hour offering. That season, even some holdovers, such as B. J. and the Bear and Buck Rogers, had multi-hour season premieres.

The show was marketed as being "grittier than the average cop show" according to Tony Schwartz of The New York Times, who described the setting as a San Francisco precinct. The Boston Globe's Jack Thomas described the show's debut as the "newest effort to dramatize the danger and frustration of police work" and as being set in the Midwest. William A. Henry III wrote in The Boston Globe that the show's marketing endured so much conflict and confusion that it would have been sufficient to keep most shows from ever being scheduled to air. With all the confusion, Henry's Globe colleague Bud Laughton described the pilot episodes and the series as "long-awaited, on-again, off-again". Henry noted that, "It is filmed to look like a documentary, with saturated color, a hand-held camera, quick cuts from scene to scene, high-decibel background noise, overlapping dialogue. The show creates atmosphere more than character. Like a documentary, it conveys a way of living more than a story." The original version of the pilot had one mortal wound, but Henry correctly predicted that it would be re-edited to reduce the violence and allow both officers to return to work.

== Reception ==
"Hill Street Station" originally aired in the United States on NBC on Thursday January 15, 1981, at 10:00 pm Eastern Time as part of a two-week five-episode limited-run pilot airing on Thursdays and Saturdays.

=== Critical review ===
Schwartz wrote in August 1980 that "...the pilot episode manages to stuff nearly every imaginable aspect of low life into its first hour: prostitution, panhandling, pickpocketing, hostage taking, drug addiction and, finally, the murder of two policemen." William Beamon of The Evening Independent noted that the opening episode introduces the audience to a vast array of characters masterfully intertwined in the storyline in a way that gives the series a "powerful start". A review in the Spartanburg Herald-Journal commented that public defender Davenport's role adds professional intrigue that heightens the provocative nature of their illicit romance. However, The Miami News's Jicha speculates that the romance was contrived to make the police show enticing to audiences. Jicha notes that the attack upon the police depicts the uncertainty of the daily life in law enforcement, but that the introduction of Belker's persona shows the writers are a bit out of touch with reality. Buckley's review in The New York Times claimed the episode "veers back and forth between comic situations that aren't funny, serious matters that aren't that convincing and a romance that is merely silly" and stated that various lighting and acting techniques were unsuccessful. The Boston Globe's Henry III wrote that "The redeeming virtue is a visual style reminiscent of documentaries – hand-held camera, saturated color, deliberately ragged editing." He also described the show as "a wacky, black-comic and frequently scary portrait of life in a big city police station". Buckley claimed that the show attempts to present an entire force of police officers with foibles that make them unfit for duty. Henry describes the shooting of the officers as an "appallingly realistic random shooting", but since they were not found for hours, he describes their survival and recovery in the next episode, "Presidential Fever", as miraculous.

=== Accolades ===
Butler won the Primetime Emmy Award for Outstanding Directing for a Drama Series at the 33rd Primetime Emmy Awards and the Directors Guild of America Award for Outstanding Directing – Drama Series at the 34th Directors Guild of America Awards. Bochco and Kozoll won the Primetime Emmy Award for Outstanding Writing for a Drama Series at the same Emmy ceremony, an Edgar Award for Best Television Episode as well as a Writers Guild of America Award for Best Screenplay – Episodic Drama at the Writers Guild of America Awards 1981. In addition, Sam Horta, Bob Cornett, Denise Horta and Eileen Horta won an Emmy for Outstanding Achievement in Film Sound Editing and William Cronjager won an Emmy for Outstanding Cinematography for a Series. Other Emmy nominations received included Ray Daniels and A. David Marshall for Outstanding Achievement in Film Editing for a Series, Mike Post for Outstanding Achievement in Music Composition for a Series (Dramatic Underscore) and Jeffrey L. Goldstein (art director) and Joseph A. Armetta (set decorator) for Outstanding Art Direction for a Series.
