= Ray Daniels (film editor) =

American film editor (1933–2017)

- Born: 27 September 1933; New London, Connecticut, U.S.
- Died: 15 July 2017 (aged 83); Los Angeles, California, U.S.
- Occupation: Film editor
- Years active: 1969–present
- Spouse: Claudia LaVarre (m. 1955)
- Children: 3

Raymond L. Daniels Jr. (September 27, 1933 – July 5, 2017) was an American film editor.

Daniels is best known for his work on The Streets of San Francisco, Starsky & Hutch, Hawaii Five-O, and Hill Street Blues. He had an extended collaboration (1981–1985) with showrunner Steven Bochco and edited the pilots for Hill Street Blues and L.A. Law. Daniels was nominated for seven Emmy Awards.

== Personal life ==
Raymond L. Daniels Jr. was born on September 27, 1933, in New London, Connecticut, US. In 1942, the family moved to Los Angeles. He attended Hollywood High School and married Claudia LaVarre, daughter of actor John Merton and sister of Lane Bradford. Daniels died on July 5, 2017, in West Hills, California, US.

== Awards and nominations ==
=== Primetime Emmy Awards ===
Year	Category	Nominated work	Result	Ref
1987	Best Single-Camera Picture Editing for a Drama Series	L.A. Law	Nominated	
1985	Best Single-Camera Picture Editing for a Limited or Anthology Series or Movie	Hollywood Wives	Nominated	
1984	Best Single-Camera Picture Editing for a Drama Series	Hill Street Blues	Nominated	
1983	Best Single-Camera Picture Editing for a Drama Series	Hill Street Blues	Won	
1982	Best Single-Camera Picture Editing for a Drama Series	Hill Street Blues	Nominated	
1981	Best Single-Camera Picture Editing for a Drama Series	Hill Street Blues	Nominated	
1975	Best Single-Camera Picture Editing for a Drama Series	The Streets of San Francisco	Nominated	

=== American Cinema Editors Awards ===
Year	Category	Nominated work	Result	Ref
1982	Best Edited Drama Series for Non-Commercial Television	Hill Street Blues	Nominated	
