= List of The Handmaid's Tale episodes =

The Handmaid's Tale is an American dystopian television series created by Bruce Miller, based on the 1985 novel of the same name by Margaret Atwood. The plot features a dystopian future following a Second American Civil War wherein a theonomic, totalitarian society subjects fertile women, called "Handmaids", to child-bearing slavery. The series features an ensemble cast, led by Elisabeth Moss, and also stars Joseph Fiennes, Yvonne Strahovski, Alexis Bledel, Madeline Brewer, Ann Dowd, O-T Fagbenle, Max Minghella, Samira Wiley, Amanda Brugel, and Bradley Whitford.

The series premiered on April 26, 2017, on Hulu. The second season premiered on April 25, 2018. The third season premiered on June 5, 2019. The fourth season premiered on April 27, 2021. In December 2020, ahead of the fourth season premiere, Hulu renewed the series for a fifth season, which premiered on September 14, 2022. In September 2022, ahead of the fifth season premiere, the series was renewed for a sixth and final season, which premiered on April 8, 2025.

During the course of the series, 66 episodes of The Handmaid's Tale aired over six seasons, between April 26, 2017, and May 27, 2025.

== Series overview ==
Season	Episodes	Originally released	
Season	Episodes	First released	Last released
1	10	April 26, 2017	June 14, 2017
2	13	April 25, 2018	July 11, 2018
3	13	June 5, 2019	August 14, 2019
4	10	April 27, 2021	June 16, 2021
5	10	September 14, 2022	November 9, 2022
6	10	April 8, 2025	May 27, 2025

== Episodes ==
=== Season 1 (2017) ===
No. overall	No. in season	Title	Directed by	Teleplay by	Original release date
1	1	"Offred"	Reed Morano	Bruce Miller	April 26, 2017
A family is pursued by a group of armed men. The woman is caught and separated from her young daughter and husband as shots are fired in the distance. Some time later, the woman is now known as Offred, the handmaid to Commander Fred Waterford. She and another handmaid, Ofglen, pass by a wall on which men have been hanged for crimes such as being gay, working in an abortion clinic, and being a Catholic priest. In a flashback, women are indoctrinated into their new role of handmaids by Aunt Lydia, and Offred sees her best friend Moira among them. Another woman, Janine, is rude to Aunt Lydia and is shocked with a cattle prod; later, her right eye is removed as punishment. In the present, Commander Waterford tries to impregnate Offred during "the Ceremony". The next day, the handmaids are encouraged to beat a man to death for allegedly raping a pregnant handmaid and killing her baby. Offred is the first to participate in the brutal execution and appears to happily do so. On the way home, Ofglen warns Offred there is an Eye in the Waterford house. Offred affirms to herself that her name is June and she intends to survive to find her daughter.
2	2	"Birth Day"	Reed Morano	Bruce Miller	April 26, 2017
June and Ofglen go food shopping, and they reveal more personal information about themselves to each other. While they are walking, they see St. Paul Catholic Church being destroyed by the new regime. Ofglen tells June that the regime also bulldozed St. Patrick's Cathedral in Manhattan to try to "erase" the fact that it ever existed. When June asks how Ofglen knows this information, Ofglen reveals that she is part of a resistance movement against the government, but June declines to join, not fully trusting Ofglen. Commander Waterford's driver, Nick, tells June that the Commander wants to see her alone later that night, which is forbidden, and warns her that Ofglen is dangerous. June and the other handmaids witness the birth of Janine/Ofwarren's child, named Angela by the Putnams but Charlotte by Janine. In flashbacks, June remembers the birth of her daughter, Hannah. At that time healthy births were already rare, and a deranged woman tried to kidnap baby Hannah from the hospital and was arrested. In the present, June warily goes to the Commander's office that night as instructed, but he simply wants to play Scrabble, to her relief. The next day, a different woman introduces herself as Ofglen.
3	3	"Late"	Reed Morano	Bruce Miller	April 26, 2017
In flashbacks, the rise of Gilead is detailed through June's eyes: June and her female colleagues were fired and the government froze women's bank accounts and ruled they could no longer own property. In the present, Serena takes June to see Janine and the baby, and June fears Janine is delusional. Back home, June is interrogated by an Eye and Aunt Lydia about her knowledge of Emily/Ofglen. Aunt Lydia physically beats and shocks June with a cattle prod for being disrespectful and quoting from the Beatitudes in the Bible (rather than accepting the modified scriptures used by Gilead) but before Aunt Lydia can hit June again, Serena intervenes, believing June is pregnant. When June later tells Serena that she is not, Serena angrily locks her in her room. In a flashback, June and Moira attend a protest against the new laws which is interrupted by automatic gunfire and explosives. In the present, Ofglen and the Martha she is in a relationship with are charged with "gender treachery". The fertile Ofglen is reassigned but the Martha is hanged. Later, Ofglen (referred to by her "old" name, Emily) awakes in a hospital recovery room to find, to her grief and anger, that she has undergone female genital mutilation surgery, as explained by Aunt Lydia.
4	4	"Nolite Te Bastardes Carborundorum"	Mike Barker	Leila Gerstein	May 3, 2017
Banished to her room, June retreats to her closet where she finds a Latin phrase, Nolite Te Bastardes Carborundorum, scratched into the wall. When Rita, the Martha assigned as the Commander's housekeeper, finds June lying on the floor, June tells her that she fainted so Serena sends her to the hospital for a check-up. During the examination the physician remarks that the Commander is most likely sterile and offers to attempt to impregnate June, but she declines. In flashbacks, Aunt Lydia teaches the handmaids about the Ceremony, in which a commander endeavors to fertilize a handmaid. Later, June and Moira assault Aunt Elizabeth, and Moira takes her outfit. June and Moira plan to escape to Boston, which has safe houses. Moira catches the train but June is detained by a soldier and returned to the Red Centre where her feet are beaten as punishment for attempting to escape. In the present, Commander Waterford has an unsuccessful Ceremony night, but later that night, they play Scrabble again. She asks him about the Latin phrase, and he tells her it means, Don't let the bastards grind you down. She learns that the previous Offred killed herself because life was unbearable. At the end, June is released from confinement to her room.
5	5	"Faithful"	Mike Barker	Dorothy Fortenberry	May 10, 2017
Serena suggests to June that she have sex with Nick in case Commander Waterford is sterile. Later that day, Serena leads June up to Nick's room and waits by the door while June and Nick have detached sex. Flashbacks detail June and Luke's first meeting and courtship. During a Ceremony night, the Commander touches June's thigh, which she later tells him never to do again. She also confronts him about Emily. He admits that while they thought they were building a better world, they knew that "better never means better for everyone." June also confronts Nick, who reveals that he is indeed an Eye. At an open-air market, June questions Emily about the resistance group (which is called Mayday). Emily jumps behind the steering wheel of a Mercedes and drives erratically around the plaza. She hits and kills a guard, and is caught and put into a van. June returns to Nick's coach house alone, and they have passionate sex.
6	6	"A Woman's Place"	Floria Sigismondi	Wendy Straker Hauser	May 17, 2017
When Mexican trade delegates visit the Waterford's home to evaluate the effects of the Gilead regime, June is asked about her experience; she lies, saying that she is happy. The handmaids are taken to a function to demonstrate Gilead's success to the delegation, illustrated by a parade of Commanders' children to whom the handmaids have given birth. The next day, June privately tells Mexico's ambassador the truth about Gilead and asks for her help, but the ambassador is unable to do anything. However, June is told by the ambassador's assistant that Luke is alive and a message can be sent to him. A flashback details Serena and Fred's life at the beginnings of the Gilead movement, when Serena was a conservative cultural activist with passion and intelligence equal to her husband's. It is revealed that she wrote a book about her beliefs, titled A Woman's Place. The Waterfords are shown to have been involved with the movement since the beginning, and Fred later finds out that the movement will attack the U.S. government. After the takeover, Serena is completely shut out and accepts her new role in the totalitarian society she helped create. A copy of her book is seen being thrown out with the trash.
7	7	"The Other Side"	Floria Sigismondi	Lynn Renee Maxcy	May 24, 2017
After he was separated from June and Hannah (from episode Offred) Luke is shot and injured but escapes when the ambulance crashes. He passes out from his wounds and is rescued by a resistance group traveling to Canada with many survivors, including Erin, a mute escaped handmaid and Zoe, the daughter of a US Army soldier. Initially reluctant, Luke joins them after Zoe shows him that Gileadan authorities hanged people from the rafters of their church for resisting. As they board a boat, Gileadan guards kill several members of the group, but Luke and Erin manage to survive. A further flashback shows Luke, June, and Hannah before they were separated. June and Luke are helped by Mr. Whitford, a man who knew June's mother. He leaves them at a secluded cabin in the woods while he arranges documentation for them to escape to Canada. However, he is caught and hanged, and a local hunter attempts to help them instead. Three years later, in the present, Luke and Erin live safely in Toronto in "Little America". Luke receives the letter from June which reads, "I love you so much. Save Hannah."
8	8	"Jezebels"	Kate Dennis	Kira Snyder	May 31, 2017
Commander Waterford gives June makeup and a dress and takes her out for the night. Nick drives them to Boston to an underground brothel, where sex workers (known as "Jezebels") work. June spots Moira and they briefly reunite. Nick trades drugs and pregnancy tests for alcohol with Beth, one of the brothel's Marthas. June goes to see Moira again, and she explains to June how Quakers tried to help her escape but were caught. Moira had the choice of being sent either to the Colonies or one of the brothels. Moira tells June to forget about escaping but June tells Moira that Luke got out. Flashbacks detail how Nick, struggling with unemployment and a troubled family, got involved with the Sons of Jacob—the precursor of the Gilead regime—and subsequently the Gilead movement, and how he became an Eye after reporting a commander for breaking protocol with his handmaids. The suicide of the previous Offred is shown. In the present, after Nick drives Waterford and June home, he ends his relationship with June, which upsets and angers her. The episode closes with June etching the words "You are not alone" into the closet wall.
9	9	"The Bridge"	Kate Dennis	Eric Tuchman	June 7, 2017
Janine's daughter is handed over to Commander Putnam and his wife, then Janine is transferred to another couple and renamed Ofdaniel. During the first Ceremony night with her new commander, Janine forcefully stops the proceedings. At the market, Alma tells June that she is involved with Mayday, and requests that June retrieve a package from the bar at Jezebels. June convinces Waterford to take her to Jezebels again that night. Waterford presents June with Moira and June privately asks Moira to retrieve the package, but she refuses. The next day June is taken to a bridge where Janine is standing on the edge with baby Charlotte, while many, including the Putnams, stand fearfully by. Janine shouts that Commander Putnam promised to leave his wife for her. June convinces Janine to give her Charlotte, but Janine then jumps into the icy water. Later, while Janine lies comatose in the hospital, Commander Putnam is led away by guards. Mrs. Putnam causes Serena to doubt her husband's loyalty. At the market, June is given a package by the butcher, sent by Moira from Jezebels. At the brothel, Moira kills a commander and takes his clothes, then drives off in his car.
10	10	"Night"	Kari Skogland	Bruce Miller	June 14, 2017
A flashback shows June's capture and indoctrination by Aunt Lydia at the Red Center. In the present, after discovering Commander Fred's trips to Jezebels, Serena forces June to take a pregnancy test, which ends up being positive. Serena angrily accuses Fred, telling him the child is not his. After learning the news, Nick and June have a tender moment. Serena takes June to see Hannah, but leaves her in the car; June becomes hysterical trying to get out. Serena warns June that Hannah will be safe as long as June's unborn child is. Following his show trial, Commander Putnam's left arm is amputated below the elbow. The package from Jezebels contains letters from women who lost family members and have been enslaved in the Gilead takeover. Later, an emotional Aunt Lydia gathers the handmaids and instructs them to stone Janine for endangering baby Charlotte. The handmaids hesitate and eventually June and the others refuse, dropping their stones. Following this, a black van comes for June, something the Waterfords were unaware of. Nick urges her to trust him and go with them. As June leaves, she whispers to Rita where to find the hidden letters. Meanwhile, Moira reaches Canada, is granted asylum and is reunited with Luke.

=== Season 2 (2018) ===
No. overall	No. in season	Title	Directed by	Teleplay by	Original release date
11	1	"June"	Mike Barker	Bruce Miller	April 25, 2018
After refusing to stone Janine, June and the other handmaids are taken to Fenway Park, where they are made to believe they will be hanged in a mock execution. At the Red Center, Aunt Lydia finds out about June's pregnancy and when June rejects a meal Lydia gives her, she is shown another pregnant handmaid chained in a prison room due to her attempted suicide. June agrees to eat and the other handmaids are punished through burning with a gas flame. June is taken to a doctor for a pregnancy check-up, where she is visited by the Waterfords. Afterward, she finds a key in one of her boots, which she uses to escape to a truck parked underneath the hospital. The truck drops her off at a safe house in Back Bay, where she meets Nick, while Fred authorizes a search party. Nick tells June to change out of her clothes and to cut her hair. June cuts the tag off her ear and burns it with her handmaid robes. In flashbacks throughout the episode, Hannah is admitted to the hospital for having a fever while in school, and June is questioned by one of the hospital workers about giving Hannah medication to bypass the school's fever policy. The authorities suggest she is a bad mother for working and wanting her child in school. Later at home, June and Luke witness the Capitol Building and White House being attacked on television.
12	2	"Unwomen"	Mike Barker	Bruce Miller	April 25, 2018
June has been transported to the abandoned headquarters of The Boston Globe to hide out. Meanwhile, Emily has been taken to the Colonies, where "unwomen" dig on toxic wasteland. Emily befriends a commander's wife and finds that she committed a "sin of the flesh" that landed her in the Colonies. Emily murders her with poisoned tablets as she blames her for "holding a woman down while her husband rapes her". Janine arrives at the Colonies and Nick visits June. In a flashback, after the attacks on DC, Emily is told by her boss, Dan, that she will not be teaching the following semester at the university, giving her a lower profile to avoid attracting criticism for her sexual orientation. Dan is later seen hanged with the word "faggot" painted underneath him. When Emily, along with her wife Sylvia and son Oliver, attempt to immigrate to Canada, she is unable to leave the country because same-sex marriage is no longer recognized, and it becomes known that she is Oliver's biological mother. In the present, June makes a news-clipping memorial for The Boston Globe employees who were executed at the newspaper's former headquarters, and prays to God to send an angel to watch over them.
13	3	"Baggage"	Kari Skogland	Dorothy Fortenberry	May 2, 2018
June learns about the emergence of the Sons of Jacob in newspaper archives and is moved to another place where she meets Omar, who tells her he is taking her to a safe house. When he learns the safe house has been compromised, he tries to leave without her. June makes him take her with him to his apartment, where she meets his wife Heather and their son Adam. When the family goes to church, June finds a hidden Qur'an. When Omar and his family do not return, June dons Heather's Econowife outfit and leaves. After a train ride, June arrives at the airstrip that Omar had told her about; unfortunately the airplane is intercepted, the pilot is executed, and June and another fugitive are apprehended by the Guardians. Meanwhile in Canada, Moira, now living with Luke and Erin and working at a refugee center, welcomes a new refugee from Gilead. A gay man, he is traumatized by his acts as a Guardian, which included killing a former boyfriend as a "gender traitor." In a flashback, as a child June is taken to a Take Back the Night rally by her mother, Holly. Holly was later disappointed at June's career and plan to marry, having hoped June would become an activist. Moira and June learn from a slideshow at the Red Center that Holly was sent to the Colonies.
14	4	"Other Women"	Kari Skogland	Yahlin Chang	May 9, 2018
A defiant June has been recaptured and chained to a bed. Aunt Lydia explains to her that she must choose between imprisonment followed by execution after childbirth, or a return to serving as a handmaid; June chooses the latter option to survive and returns to the Waterford household. The Waterfords treat June's disappearance as a kidnapping, but privately Serena is furious and grabs June by the throat. Rita returns the letters she found and tells June that she will no longer be involved. A baby shower is held for Serena, incorporating prayer and a binding of June to Serena. June learns from Alma that Ofglen No. 2's tongue was removed for speaking up for Janine, and that Mayday is silent and is done helping handmaids. Aunt Lydia takes June out to show her Omar hanging on the wall, telling June that Omar's wife Heather is now a handmaid, their son Adam was given away, and this was June's fault. June feels responsible for other people's suffering and collapses under the knowledge of Omar's family's fate. Aunt Lydia encourages her to distinguish between Offred's identity and June's, saying June is to blame, not Offred. In a flashback, June is harassed by Luke's first wife Annie, who tells her that she and Luke made wedding vows before God, and June should back off, but Luke rejects Annie's plea. Years later, Annie sees Luke and June in a cafe with Hannah, and Annie glares at June before leaving.
15	5	"Seeds"	Mike Barker	Kira Snyder	May 16, 2018
Emotionally beaten and subservient once again, June burns some letters she had been keeping for Mayday. She notices vaginal bleeding but does not inform anyone. Nick notices June's apparent depression and informs Serena. Serena, alarmed at Nick's interest in June, apprises Fred, who arranges for Nick to be married at a "Prayvaganza" event where loyal Guardians receive a wife. Nick's new, young bride, a 15-year-old girl named Eden, moves into his room. He avoids sleeping with her. Nick later finds June bloody and unconscious and she is hospitalized. June awakens in the hospital and promises her unborn baby that they both will escape Gilead. In the Colonies, Janine assures Emily that God is protecting them through their struggles in Gilead, and helps to arrange a small wedding for a dying worker, officiated by another unwoman who is a rabbi. Emily, who has begun to lose her teeth through radiation poisoning, argues with Janine for attempting to bring brightness to a place that otherwise seems so bleak. When the newlywed unwoman dies, the rabbi officiates at the burial as the deceased is lowered into her grave in a huge cemetery adorned with crosses.
16	6	"First Blood"	Mike Barker	Eric Tuchman	May 23, 2018
Advised by a doctor that a harmonious household would benefit the child, Serena shows care for June, giving her the sitting room as a bedroom and inviting her friends for brunch while she is recovering. When Serena shows June the nursery for the baby, June asks to see Hannah. In retaliation, Serena moves June back to her previous room. Eden reveals to June that she fears Nick may be a "gender traitor" due to his reluctance for intimacy, so June warns him. Nick has sex with Eden, but only after he tells June that he loves her. Fred visits June and gives her a photograph of Hannah. At the opening of the new Rachel and Leah Center, Nick asks Commander Pryce to reassign him and ensure June's protection. Suddenly, Ofglen No. 2 approaches the front of the hall and detonates a bomb. Flashbacks show the beginning of the Gilead movement with Serena being attacked while promoting her book A Woman's Place. After being booed, Fred forces Serena to finish her speech, which is met by jeers and clapping, escalating when a protester shoots Serena in the abdomen. Fred executes a student involved in his wife's shooting.
17	7	"After"	Kari Skogland	Lynn Renee Maxcy	May 30, 2018
In the aftermath of the suicide bombing at the Rachel and Leah Center, 31 handmaids, 26 commanders (including Commander Pryce), and many civilians were killed, plus dozens more wounded. Despite being near the front of the building, Fred survives with serious injuries. Serena takes on some of his duties, forging his signature. Commander Cushing then takes Commander Pryce's role, increases checkpoints, and orders numerous people executed in the streets. He questions June and asks who aided her in trying to flee the country. June responds that she was kidnapped. Serena is alarmed at her household being targeted and the loss of temporary power she held, so she forges orders to have Commander Cushing arrested. Because many handmaids were killed, some women from the Colonies are made to serve as handmaids again, including Janine and Emily. Both reunite with June in the grocery store, where Janine happily tells June that it was God's plan that she be rescued. June tells Emily her true name and several of the handmaids whisper their names to one another. Serena enlists June's help in performing Fred's work for him while he is hospitalized. At the refugee center in Canada, Moira looks through records to try to find out what happened to her fiancée, Odette. Moira is revealed to have been a surrogate birth mother for a couple and Odette was their obstetrician. In the present, Moira eventually finds photographs showing Odette was killed.
18	8	"Women's Work"	Kari Skogland	Nina Fiore & John Herrera	June 6, 2018
Serena gives June a music box and flower for June's help in completing Fred's work while he continues to recover in the hospital. Serena tells June that the Putnams' child is ill and not gaining weight. June advocates for Janine to be able to see the baby, and Serena agrees to ask about it. Naomi Putnam dislikes the idea, but she is overruled by her husband. Serena petitions Fred to allow the child to be seen by a Martha who, prior to the Sons of Jacob coup, was a top neonatologist. Fred denies the request, so Serena forges Fred's signature on an order that temporarily transfers the Martha to the hospital. Lydia tells June that she will hold her responsible if anything goes wrong with Janine's visit to the hospital. The neonatologist can find no physical explanation for the child's deterioration and recommends no further treatment other than supportive care. When Fred discovers that Serena forged his signature on an order to temporarily transfer the Martha, he beats Serena with his belt. After Eden rearranges Nick's garret and uncovers the bundle of handmaids' letters, he demands that Eden never touch his belongings. At the end, Janine holds baby Angela/Charlotte, singing "I Only Want to Be with You" and the baby's health improves.
19	9	"Smart Power"	Jeremy Podeswa	Dorothy Fortenberry	June 13, 2018
The Waterfords and Nick travel to Canada on a diplomatic mission. While they are away, a young Guardian named Isaac is left in charge of the household. Serena is approached by Mark Tuello, who works for a remnant of the U.S. government in Hawaii and offers to help her defect from Gilead if she will publicly denounce the regime, but Serena declines. At the Waterford residence, June tells Rita that when Hannah was baptized, she and Luke chose godparents for her, and that she wants Rita to be the godmother of her expected child as soon as it is born. Rita states that she will try her best, although the government of Gilead has prohibited baptisms and severely restricts Marthas. June makes a similar request to Aunt Lydia, prompting Lydia to reveal she was previously the godmother to her sister's baby, who died in infancy. In Canada, Nick finds Luke and tells him June is pregnant by Fred and gives him the bundle of letters. Luke, Moira, and Erin make the letters public, which prompts the Canadians to cancel the summit. After returning to Gilead, Nick gives June news of Luke and Moira, adding that the letters were instrumental in curtailing the talks. June reveals that Moira is Hannah's godmother.
20	10	"The Last Ceremony"	Jeremy Podeswa	Yahlin Chang	June 20, 2018
The commander to whom Emily is newly assigned as handmaid collapses and dies from a sudden heart attack during the Ceremony. June suffers contractions while shopping, forcing her to go home and to endure a "birthing ceremony" as everyone awaits the birth of the child. However, it turns out to be a false labor. June pleads to Fred to be positioned closer to her daughter Hannah after the eventual birth. After Fred denies this request, June implies that the child she is carrying is not his and that he will never have a child of his own. Fred rapes June with Serena holding her down, under the guise of inducing labor. Meanwhile, Eden finds herself attracted to Isaac and meets with him at night. They kiss, but she stops once she sees Nick. She begs Nick's forgiveness, which he gives with a detachment that infuriates her. She accuses Nick of liking June. Fred arranges for Nick to take June to a remote house for a visit with Hannah, now renamed Agnes. There is thick snow on the ground and the sound of wolves. Hannah is initially shy and detached, but then she embraces June, and mother and daughter have a brief reunion. After they are separated, Guardians take Nick captive, and June is left behind, having hidden in the house.
21	11	"Holly"	Daina Reid	Bruce Miller & Kira Snyder	June 27, 2018
After Nick is taken away from the house, June sees a car in the garage and searches the house for the keys. She returns to the house and begin to pack some supplies. Flashbacks throughout the episode show her first pregnancy and Hannah's birth and childhood. Fred and Serena arrive at the house in a panic looking for June, and end up arguing, with Serena telling Fred she gave up everything for him and the cause, and only ever wanted a child in return. June finds a gun and from an upper floor and prepares to shoot them but does not do so. The Waterfords are unable to find June and decide to leave, feeling both angry and concerned. After she is certain they are gone, June, having contractions, gets back into the car but cannot get it out of the garage, which is frozen shut. June is exhausted and in pain, lies down in front of the fire, and finally goes into labour and passes out. When she awakens, she is covered in blood, but the baby still has not come. She crawls outside and discharges the gun to attract attention, then ends up delivering the baby by herself. She whispers that the baby's name is Holly, after June's mother. Light comes in through the windows, indicating that a car has arrived at the house.
22	12	"Postpartum"	Daina Reid	Eric Tuchman	July 4, 2018
June is separated from her baby but expected to provide milk. When she is unable to pump enough milk, Aunt Lydia allows her to see the baby in order to induce lactation. As June's lactation increases during the meeting, Lydia convinces Fred to allow June back in the house for the baby's health. Nick, who is back in the Waterford household and presented as having been key to the rescue of June and the baby, suggests that he, June, and the baby should flee to Hawaii, and Fred attempts to renew elements of his relationship with June. Meanwhile, Emily is reassigned to the Lawrence household as a handmaid after being rejected by four other couples. His unstable wife, Eleanor, reveals to Emily that Lawrence was the creator of the Colonies. Lawrence reveals that he knows much about Emily's past. Eden and Isaac elope but are caught. Eden and Nick admit their faults and ask each other's forgiveness. Eden and Isaac are brought to a public diving board above a swimming pool to be executed for infidelity; each of them is attached to chains and weights. Both refuse to repent, and instead Eden begins to recite a biblical paean to love. They are both pushed off and drown. Made distraught by the events, Serena allows June to nurse the baby herself.
23	13	"The Word"	Mike Barker	Bruce Miller	July 11, 2018
It is revealed that it was Eden's father who turned Eden and Isaac in. While searching through Eden's belongings, June discovers a Bible that Eden read from and annotated, despite it being illegal for women to read and write in Gilead (besides the Aunts). June argues about Holly's future in Gilead, stating that Holly will not be able to know God unless she is able to read His word. At a leaders' meeting, Serena proposes that girls be taught to read only from the Bible, and reads from the Bible to make her point. She is punished by having a finger removed. Meanwhile, Emily is dismissed by Lawrence, who does not undergo the ceremony. Emily is visited by Lydia and as Lydia leaves, Emily stabs her. Fred suggests to June that he could arrange for her to remain his handmaid, offering meetings with Hannah; June rejects the proposal. As a fire consumes a neighboring house, Rita tells June that she and Holly have a chance to get out. Nick prevents Fred from arranging their capture. Serena catches June, but has a change of heart as she imagines the restricted future that awaits "her daughter". She allows June to take Holly, assisted by the Marthas. June is reunited with Emily, who is dropped off at the escape truck by Lawrence. Instead of escaping with them, June hands Holly to Emily, telling her to call her Nichole. June turns back to Gilead, determined to continue looking for her other daughter Hannah.

=== Season 3 (2019) ===
No. overall	No. in season	Title	Directed by	Written by	Original release date
24	1	"Night"	Mike Barker	Bruce Miller	June 5, 2019
After a treacherous journey, Emily escapes Gilead with June's baby Holly into Canada, where they are granted asylum and Holly is taken into the care of Luke and Moira. Back in Gilead, June asks Commander Lawrence (who had facilitated Emily and Holly's escape to Canada) to take her to Hannah before being recaptured by the Guardians and returned to the Waterfords, but not before Hannah's placement mother, Mrs. MacKenzie, warns June that any future visits could result in her execution in front of Hannah. In order to protect himself and Serena from her involvement in Holly's "kidnapping", Fred publicly pins the blame on Emily, but privately, Serena defiantly tells him that she was the one who sent Holly away and tries to kill herself by burning down the house but is rescued by June. After being punished at the Red Center, June is reassigned to Commander Lawrence.
25	2	"Mary and Martha"	Mike Barker	Kira Snyder	June 5, 2019
June, who is now Ofjoseph, meets her new shopping partner, Ofmatthew, a handmaid who is smugly pious. At the Lawrence household, June joins an underground resistance cell consisting of the Marthas Beth and Cora. They are hiding a fugitive Martha named Alison, a former chemistry teacher who joined the Mayday resistance in order to make bombs to destroy the Gilead ruling government. It is also revealed that she made the bomb that blew up the new Rachel and Leah center. June and Beth help Alison escape, however, the escape attempt fails, and she later returns to the Lawrence household with another wounded Martha, who was shot by Guardians. Commander Lawrence reluctantly harbors the fugitive from the Guardians. Lawrence's wife, Eleanor, helps June and the Marthas hide the wounded woman. The Martha succumbs to her injury and June digs a grave for her in the backyard and says a prayer for her. Lawrence dismisses Cora for lying and Eleanor plants flowers over the grave. In Canada, Emily is staying with Luke, Moira, and Erin, and after some hesitation, is convinced by Moira to re-establish contact with her wife Sylvia.
26	3	"Useful"	Amma Asante	Yahlin Chang	June 5, 2019
A new Martha, Sienna, replaces Cora's position in the Lawrence household. June resolves to search for "allies with power" in order to survive Gilead. The commanders meet at Lawrence's house to discuss the fighting in Chicago including an incoming shipment of female captives. June encounters Nick, who has been promoted to commander, and the two share a tender moment. Lawrence conscripts June to select five Chicago women to serve as Marthas; the remainders will be shipped to the Colonies, which is ultimately a death sentence. While initially unwilling to be complicit in Lawrence's crimes, June eventually chooses five Marthas who would make good recruits for her resistance cell: an engineer, an IT technician, a journalist, a lawyer, and a thief. Meanwhile, a despondent Serena goes to stay with her mother Pamela, who chastises her for losing her child and for not realizing that without Fred, Serena has no place in Gileadean society.
27	4	"God Bless the Child"	Amma Asante	Eric Tuchman	June 12, 2019
June and some of her fellow handmaids attend a reception at the Putnam household. There, June convinces Fred to give Serena a "voice behind the scenes" in Gilead. Flashbacks throughout the episode show June and Luke's baptism of Hannah by a Christian priest before the hostile takeover by the Sons of Jacob, who now dedicate children, rather than baptize infants. In the present, June learns that Ofmatthew has given birth to three babies. Janine, serving as Ofhoward, pleads with the Putnams to invite her back into the house so that she can produce a sibling for baby Charlotte. Aunt Lydia furiously beats her in full view of the commanders and the wives until June throws herself between Janine and Aunt Lydia. In shock, Aunt Lydia then apologizes for what happened and privately breaks down in tears. Serena tells June that Hannah is at a school in Brookline, Massachusetts. June and the Waterfords later receive video footage of Holly with Luke in Canada, during a demonstration condemning Gilead's hostile assault on Chicago. June is forced to confirm her husband's identity. In Canada, Emily awkwardly reunites with her wife Sylvia and their son Oliver, and Luke and Moira ask a Christian minister to baptize Holly, which they do in a church.
28	5	"Unknown Caller"	Colin Watkinson	Marissa Jo Cerar	June 19, 2019
In exchange for a favor from Serena, June agrees to phone Luke to arrange a meeting between the Waterfords and Holly. Mark Tuello (whom Serena met the last time the Waterfords were in Canada) is in charge of arranging the meeting. Luke agrees to the meeting on the condition that only Serena attend the meeting and not Fred. During their tense meeting at Toronto Pearson International Airport, Serena reassures Luke that June is safe and that both she and June gave up Holly to give Holly a better life in Canada. Serena passes Luke a locket for Holly, as well as a cassette tape she smuggled out of Gilead, containing a recorded message from June, revealing the name she gave to Nichole (Holly) and the baby's biological father (Nick). After unsuccessfully trying to convince Serena to defect for a second time, Mark hides a satellite phone in Serena's purse when she returns to Gilead, so she can contact him if necessary. Serena goes back on her pledge to set baby Holly free, and wants to bring her back to Gilead. Later, June is picked up by Guardians and forced to participate in a televised broadcast in which the Waterfords state that they are a family mourning the kidnapping of Holly and urge the Canadian government to return their daughter to Gilead.
29	6	"Household"	Dearbhla Walsh	Dorothy Fortenberry	June 26, 2019
The Waterfords, June, Rita and Aunt Lydia travel to Washington, D.C. to stay with the family of High Commander George Winslow and his wife Olivia. The Winslows live in a mansion with six children by different Handmaids. There, they meet with a delegation of Swiss diplomats who seek to negotiate between Gilead and Canada and prepare to take part in internationally broadcast mass prayers being held at the former Washington Monument that has now been turned into a giant cross, asking for the return of baby Holly from Canada. June and Aunt Lydia are appalled at how in Washington, the leadership caste has forced all handmaids to always be muzzled to cover up metal ring piercings used to permanently keep their mouths closed. Commander Winslow suggests to Fred that he may have a position for him in D.C. June reunites with Nick, who as a commander now prepares military forces for the Chicago frontline against the rebels. June makes a deal with the Swiss to convince Nick to provide information on Gilead's power structure, however they reject talking to Nick upon learning information on war crimes he committed in the early days of the Gilead takeover. June and Serena confront each other over Serena's change of heart regarding baby Holly, and Serena reveals that Nick was a soldier in the crusade and so was directly involved in the attacks on the White House and the Capitol. Afterwards, the Waterfords force June to lead thousands of handmaids massed along what used to be the Lincoln Memorial Reflecting Pool in a televised prayer for Holly's return.
30	7	"Under His Eye"	Mike Barker	Nina Fiore & John Herrera	July 3, 2019
While visiting the supermarket, June arranges with Frances (the Mackenzies' Martha) to visit Hannah at her school in Brookline. In Canada, Emily and Sylvia meet with one of the Swiss diplomats, who questions Emily about crimes she has been accused of committing in Gilead. Emily acknowledges them but does not regret the actions she took to survive there. Emily and Moira join a group of protesters who confront the Canadian Immigration Minister over his negotiations with Gilead, and they are arrested. Olivia Winslow recommends to Serena that her family move to Washington, D.C., showing her that she could move into the former house of a Baptist family that was executed following the Sons of Jacob takeover. Fred and Serena renew their love for each other while negotiations take place to secure Holly's return and an extradition treaty with Canada. June convinces housebound Eleanor to accompany her on a visit to Brookline, but the two are not permitted entry into the school. The strain proves to be too much for Eleanor, who becomes hysterical and returns home exhausted. Afterward, June participates in an execution where Frances and several others are hanged for "endangering a sacred child". June realizes that Ofmatthew was spying on her and reported Frances to Aunt Lydia. June furiously attacks Ofmatthew, but is restrained by her fellow handmaids.
31	8	"Unfit"	Mike Barker	Kira Snyder	July 10, 2019
After the execution, Ofmatthew is ostracized by the other handmaids. In a ritual in which handmaids are admonished to "testify" for their sins, June is singled out for being responsible for the death of Frances, which will negatively affect Hannah. June exposes Ofmatthew's doubts about wanting to carry another child to term. In the night, Handmaid Ofandy gives birth to a stillborn girl. Ofmatthew snaps when she is with June at a grocery store and after ferociously beating Janine, grabs a gun from a Guardian and prepares to shoot Aunt Lydia (who addresses Ofmatthew by her real name, Natalie), before another Guardian shoots her and she is taken away. When June asks Lawrence about the whereabouts of Hannah and her family, he informs her that he does not know where they have relocated. Flashbacks show Aunt Lydia's past: she was a caring Christian teacher who was rejected by her school's principal when, at the urging of a neglectful single mother whom she had befriended, she made a pass at him during their first date. Seeing that the mother was dating several men and did not attend church and that her child wore dirty clothes, Lydia reported her to child protective services and her son was placed in a foster home.
32	9	"Heroic"	Daina Reid	Lynn Renee Maxcy	July 17, 2019
Natalie is rendered brain dead after the shooting and is placed on life support until her baby is born. As punishment for her role in engineering Natalie's humiliation and shooting, June is kept in the hospital room, praying on her knees, all day for weeks, under Aunt Lydia's orders. After over a month, June struggles with her mental state as well as her culpability in Natalie's death. June makes two mercy killing attempts on Natalie, but is stopped by Janine, who tells her that Natalie is one of them, and that June has become selfish. June attacks Serena when she visits the hospital and suffers cuts to her hand, but Serena does not report the attack. A sympathetic doctor stitches June's wounds, complimenting her for her bravery and June finds out he knew her mother. As Natalie's condition deteriorates, the doctors are forced to deliver her premature son by Caesarean section. In the hospital, June encounters a young girl who has reached menarche and wants to bear children. After the baby has been delivered, June is allowed to leave, but gets permission from Aunt Lydia to remain with Natalie in her final moments. June apologizes to the brain-dead Natalie for losing her way and tells her that her son is a fighter and vows to rescue as many children from Gilead as she can. Meanwhile, Aunt Lydia shows that she cares for Janine when she gifts her with an eye-patch to conceal her disfigured socket.
33	10	"Witness"	Daina Reid	Jacey Heldrich	July 24, 2019
High Commander Winslow visits Boston, where he reveals plans to import the muzzling of handmaids currently implemented in Washington D.C. to other districts starting with Boston. Fred wants to oust Lawrence from power so he arranges for Winslow, Serena, and Aunt Lydia to oversee Lawrence's next "ceremony" with June, as he thinks Lawrence will fail this test of his mastery over his household. June, Eleanor and Lawrence are allowed to enter the bedroom together, while the others wait downstairs. Eleanor becomes loudly hysterical and must be restrained. June convinces Lawrence and Eleanor to go through with the ceremony, citing the fact that Fred would kill not just Lawrence and his wife but also their entire household, as such purges are carried out in Gilead. After the doctor checks June to confirm that the ceremony was successful, June informs Lawrence of her plans to smuggle children out of Gilead and offers to have Lawrence take credit for the rescue so that he and Eleanor can defect to Canada without fear of reprisals for Lawrence's role in the government of Gilead. Serena confronts Fred over allowing Winslow influence in the district, having realized that Winslow has no intention of helping the Waterfords regain Holly.
34	11	"Liars"	Deniz Gamze Ergüven	Yahlin Chang	July 31, 2019
With her mental state deteriorating, Eleanor points a gun at Lawrence and June intervenes to save him and calm his wife. In return she asks him to help her smuggle children out of Gilead. Beth arranges for a group of Marthas to meet with June and agree to help her with her plan; they mention a man, named Billy, who works at Jezebels, who helps them. Lawrence tries to escape the country with Eleanor but is unable to cross checkpoints, so he returns home. June travels with Lawrence to Jezebels to meet Billy, and afterward encounters Winslow, who attempts to rape her. June fights off and kills Winslow. Afterward, a Martha helps June escape, and she reveals to June that she was one of the five women from Chicago that June had saved from the Colonies. The Marthas working at the brothel clean the room and cremate Winslow's body. Meanwhile, the Waterfords travel to meet with Mark Tuello in order to expedite Holly's return. They stop at their friend's house where they dine with their family and hear them sing Dona nobis pacem and imagine life in a world where the Sons of Jacob did not establish rule. When the Waterfords drive to meet Tuello, he, unbeknownst to Fred, leads them to Canada where the Canadian Army arrests Fred for war crimes.
35	12	"Sacrifice"	Deniz Gamze Ergüven	Eric Tuchman	August 7, 2019
Commanders Putnam and Calhoun meet with Lawrence to discuss the current events in Gilead. Beth informs June that the plan to get the children out of Gilead is underway with an airplane being expected to arrive in one week. In Canada, the Waterfords spend time in a detention facility and while Fred worries for Serena's safety, she reveals to him that she has betrayed him and was involved in their capture, in order that she might get to spend time with Holly. Luke and Moira meet with Fred and Serena respectively, and Serena is allowed to spend time with Holly. In an argument over June, Luke punches Fred. Olivia Winslow and Naomi Putnam come to visit the Lawrence house to pray for the safety of Commander Winslow, who officials believe has been kidnapped. Eleanor begins ranting incoherently, almost spilling news of June's plan to take kidnapped children from their Gilead families. After June scolds Eleanor, she retreats to her room. June later goes to deliver food and drink to Eleanor, but sees that she has overdosed on medication to try to kill herself. Eleanor is groggy but still breathing, but ultimately June decides not to help her and quietly leaves. Eleanor is found dead the next morning by Sienna, and a funeral is later held for her.
36	13	"Mayday"	Mike Barker	Bruce Miller	August 14, 2019
After being captured, June witnessed disabled women being rounded up and executed. She tried to find out Hannah's whereabouts from a Guardian, who tells her to be quiet, and she is thrown into a truck with Janine. In the present, hours before the intended midnight meeting time, a Martha brings a little girl to the Lawrence household, still in daylight. The Martha later loses her nerve, changes her mind and threatens to leave with the child, but June stops her at the point of a gun, retaining the girl. The Martha is caught returning home, causing Gilead to intensify patrols of the region. More children than originally planned arrive at the Lawrence household, and when Janine informs June that soldiers are checking every house, they all start heading to the airport. In Canada, Fred informs Tuello of the crimes Serena is responsible for in retaliation for her betrayal. She is shocked to be detained after previously having been given freedom to roam the city and spend time with Holly. Outside the airport, June and other handmaids and Marthas (including Janine, Alma, Brianna, Beth and Sienna) cause a distraction, throwing stones at two Guardian soldiers to allow Rita and the children to sneak aboard the airplane. June is shot but manages to see the plane escaping. When the plane lands, Luke, Moira and Emily are all volunteering at the airport in Canada, where the girl is reunited with her father. Rita informs Luke that June is responsible for the delivery of the children to safety. June is badly wounded but is found by Janine, Alma, Brianna and other handmaids who carry her out of the woods using her cloak.

=== Season 4 (2021) ===
No. overall	No. in season	Title	Directed by	Written by	Original release date
37	1	"Pigs"	Colin Watkinson	Bruce Miller	April 27, 2021
A badly wounded June is taken to a Mayday safehouse by the other handmaids, which is a farmhouse run by Esther Keyes, the fiercely angry 14-year-old bride of Commander Keyes. Esther has been sedating her elderly husband to keep him from finding out about her involvement with helping Mayday, and with the arrival of June, helps the fugitive handmaids secure complete control over the compound. After learning that Esther was repeatedly raped by her husband's associates, June promises that God will bring those men to justice. One of the rapists later trespasses on the farm and Esther, under June's direction, executes him in the barn for the crimes of rape and treason. Aunt Lydia is interrogated at the hands of the Commanders and is pardoned; she declares June a menace who must be destroyed to prevent her taking down Gilead. Serena and Fred meanwhile discover the arrival of the rescued children in Canada and the threat of war their arrival heralds as Gilead demands their return. They are also informed that they will be kept in custody as their trial will be postponed.
38	2	"Nightshade"	Colin Watkinson	Kira Snyder	April 27, 2021
Guardians come to the farm looking for the murdered Guardian, which precipitates the need for the handmaids to move on from the Keyes farm. June is escorted to a Jezebel house to get the details of the next safe house. While at the Jezebels, June realizes it is filled with visiting commanders and June decides to liberate the Jezebels. June helps the women to poison the commanders, intending to leave for the safe house the next day. June successfully returns to the Keyes farm from the Jezebels to find bullet casings on the ground. Suspicious, her escort reaches for his pistol and is shot in the head by a sniper. While June is surrounded by snipers, Nick comes out of the shadows and reveals himself to be looking for the handmaids. He takes June as a prisoner. Meanwhile, Rita struggles with her new freedom in Canada, and the rescued children are reunited with family in Canada, though several express a desire to return to their previous captors in Gilead. Serena meets Fred in the facility's chapel and tries to reconcile with him but he is still angry at her betrayal; afterward, she is told by Mark Tuello that she is pregnant.
39	3	"The Crossing"	Elisabeth Moss	Bruce Miller	April 27, 2021
Gilead police torture June to make her reveal the location of the other handmaids. Faced with having her fingernails ripped off with pliers, June lies about the location of her fellow handmaids. As punishment, June is taken to the roof of the center and forced to watch Beth and Sienna being pushed to their deaths. Lawrence warns June that they will hurt Hannah if June does not disclose the handmaids' location. After seeing her terrified daughter and fearing for her safety, June reveals the location of her friends. June expects to be executed but Aunt Lydia explains that she and the others will be sent to an agricultural "Magdalene Colony" to labor in the fields and be raped by commanders and their wives for the ceremony. On her way to the colony, June and Nick meet and Nick tells June that Hannah is safe and back home. June, Janine, Aunt Lydia, and four other handmaids are traveling to the colony when they stop at a train crossing. June attacks Lydia and the handmaids stage an escape, but the driver shoots and kills two handmaids as they run to put the oncoming train between themselves and the driver. June and Janine cross the tracks and escape, but Alma and Brianna are both hit by the passing train, killing them.
40	4	"Milk"	Christina Choe	Jacey Heldrich	May 5, 2021
June and Janine walk for miles and escape Gilead in a milk tanker that is part of a train headed to Chicago. After Janine questions how they were found, June confesses that she revealed the location of the handmaids. Janine is disgusted with June and says she would never have ratted out her friends. American fighters raid the train and bring them to their living quarters, but the group is short on resources. June decides they must leave after the leader Steven asks for oral sex in exchange for taking them in, but Janine agrees to submit to the abuse, which provides the two with food and shelter. In flashbacks, young mother Janine visits a crisis pregnancy center, where she is advised to continue her current pregnancy rather than abort her child. She subsequently visits a different doctor, who gives her abortion pills. In Canada, Rita is told that there is no news of her relatives at any of the refugee camps, but Moira assures her that Catholics learned to forge passports to escape Gilead. Rita receives a request from Serena to visit her where she and Fred are awaiting trial. During the visit, Serena reveals that she is pregnant with a boy and gives Rita the fetal ultrasound as a gift, asking Rita's help to care for the child. Rita does not object to the request but later informs Fred of Serena's pregnancy.
41	5	"Chicago"	Christina Choe	John Herrera & Nina Fiore	May 12, 2021
Janine develops a relationship with Steven, which strains her friendship with June. June feels the Americans are too cautious in their fight against Gilead. June asks Steven if she can accompany a group to trade with another camp intending to contact the Nighthawk rebels, and he agrees after Janine vouches for her. Nick is still eager to find June and on Lawrence's suggestion he meets with two Marthas: one of them reveals that June is in Chicago. Meanwhile, Aunt Lydia tries to blackmail Commander Lawrence but instead strikes a deal with him to be reinstated as an active Aunt in exchange for compromising information that Lawrence can use against other Commanders to recover his own position. The Commanders agree to Lawrence's suggestion of a short ceasefire on Gilead's borders in order to alleviate Gilead's economic crisis, which Nick hopes to exploit as a chance to find June. June leaves Steven's Chicago camp and Janine decides to leave with her. The Commanders tell Nick to withdraw troops from the borders because they plan an aerial attack prior to the ceasefire in an attempt to quash the rebel factions. Gilead bombs Chicago just before the ceasefire, and Moira, one of the relief workers, finds shell-shocked June injured amidst the rubble; however, Janine's fate is unknown.
42	6	"Vows"	Richard Shepard	Dorothy Fortenberry	May 19, 2021
Moira convinces June to leave for Canada on the ship with the relief workers, as the situation in Chicago has become chaotic. Hundreds of desperate refugees are being prevented from boarding the boat leaving Chicago, as this violates the ceasefire terms that the relief workers operate under. On the way to Canada, the ship must first be checked by Gileadean patrol boats. The relief team reluctantly agrees to provide a false identity card for June to prevent her from being recaptured. Moira's girlfriend Oona, who is in charge of the mission, ends their relationship as Oona feels Moira has put her friend above the mission of the relief workers. June tries to escape in a lifeboat in a desperate bid to rescue Hannah, but Moira begs her to stay aboard the relief ship and be reunited with Luke and Holly. Eventually the ship arrives in Canada and June is reunited with Luke, although she is wracked with guilt over leaving Hannah behind. June has flashbacks to the times when she and Luke were planning their life together and when June became pregnant with Hannah.
43	7	"Home"	Richard Shepard	Yahlin Chang	May 26, 2021
June officially requests asylum in Canada as Tuello arrives at the docked boat. Luke and June are taken to a hotel, where June sleeps for seventeen hours and is then interviewed by Tuello. Luke takes June back to his house where she is reunited with Emily, Holly, and Rita, who informs June that Serena is pregnant. Oona stops by the house to deliver a gift for June and lets Moira know that her NGO is no longer able to perform work outside of Canada; Moira apologizes and lets Oona know that she cares for her and wants to discuss their relationship rather than end it. Serena prays in the chapel for a healthy baby and is overheard by Tuello, who suggests that she speak with Fred. In the middle of the night, June asks to see Serena in prison. Serena tries to make amends, but June furiously condemns her for the torture inflicted on her in Gilead. June returns home and initiates sex with Luke but ends up raping him, similar to the way she was raped. The next day, June warns Tuello that Serena is manipulative and not to trust her.
44	8	"Testimony"	Elisabeth Moss	Kira Snyder	June 2, 2021
June gives testimony against the Waterfords at the International Criminal Court and leaves after cross-examination by the defense attorney. Luke observes the court proceedings to better understand what June has gone through, despite June's wish that he not attend. At the hearing, Fred arrogantly denies all responsibility and brags that the Waterford's actions in Gilead led to the amelioration of the global fertility crisis. In a therapy group for former handmaids, Irene, a former Aunt, requests to speak with Emily, but she rebuffs her. It is revealed that Irene informed the Eyes of Emily's relationship with a Martha, which caused Emily to be genitally mutilated and her lover murdered. Irene asks Emily for forgiveness and offers her reparations, but Emily refuses. Moira later convinces Emily to speak to Irene privately and get her to testify in court, but when Emily drives to Irene's house, she discovers that Irene has died by hanging herself. June tells Luke about her last meeting with Hannah. As the Waterfords prepare for the next court day, they are greeted by a large contingent of pro-Gilead supporters. Meanwhile in Gilead, Aunt Lydia is reprimanded by Lawrence for her violent attacks on a handmaid in training and even another Aunt, but he places the recaptured Janine in Lydia's care anyway. Janine begs not be made a handmaid again, but Aunt Lydia just embraces her.
45	9	"Progress"	Elisabeth Moss	Eric Tuchman & Aly Monroe	June 9, 2021
Luke and June continue their search for Hannah by calling Commander Lawrence but he refuses to help them. In Gilead, Esther is now a handmaid in training and defiantly goes on a hunger strike. Janine encourages her to stop to avoid torture or worse. Esther reluctantly complies for which Aunt Lydia praises the two young women. June agrees to a meeting with Nick to obtain information about Hannah. Tuello arranges the meeting at a Catholic school in the neutral zone. June takes Holly with her, which pleases Nick, who gives their daughter a doll. They embrace and Nick provides June with a file on Hannah, including some recent photographs and her current location in Colorado. Fred and Serena are visited by Commander Warren Putnam and his wife Naomi. Assuming that the Waterfords will soon be in jail, Naomi offers to take care of the Waterford baby, and Warren informs Fred that Gilead will not negotiate their release for political reasons. Fred then strikes a deal with Tuello to dismiss the ICC charges against him in return for information on Gilead's inner workings. When June learns of this, she rages against Tuello.
46	10	"The Wilderness"	Liz Garbus	Bruce Miller	June 16, 2021
June's testimony against Fred is recorded as the ICC judges are busy. She reveals to Emily that she is outraged that Fred will be flying to Geneva where he will be granted immunity for his crimes. June meets with Fred, who tries to apologize for the pain she felt when her daughter was taken away. June still hates him and bargains with Tuello for Fred to be brought to justice. She arranges for the two to meet in a closed diner with Commander Lawrence, who proposes to release 22 freedom fighting Gileadan women in exchange for Fred. Tuello says he will seek approval from his boss. Fred says goodbye to Serena and prepares to leave for Geneva, but before he can board the airplane, he is arrested by Tuello, traded for the 22 women and brought to Lawrence and Nick, who delivers Fred to June in No Man's Land. June, Emily and other former handmaids chase Fred through the forest, beat him to death and hang him on a wall. June arrives home with blood on her face, much to the shock of Luke who realizes the full extent of her brutalization at the hands of Gilead and what she is now capable of in vengeance. As Serena waits for Fred to video call her online as they had planned, a security officer sorts Serena's mail and opens an envelope that includes Fred's wedding ring and ring finger.

=== Season 5 (2022) ===
No. overall	No. in season	Title	Directed by	Written by	Original release date
47	1	"Morning"	Elisabeth Moss	Bruce Miller	September 14, 2022
Following Fred's murder, a euphoric June confesses to Luke and Moira her involvement and drives to a diner to meet with the ex-handmaids who helped her, including Danielle, Tyler, and Vicky. June begins experiencing symptoms of post-traumatic stress disorder and becomes agitated when the handmaids ask for her help in hunting down the people who abused them in Gilead. When June declines, they condemn her, calling her selfish. Emily has gone missing, so June drives to Emily's home where Sylvia tells June that Emily has gone back to Gilead to fight. June has another PTSD episode in a washroom, where she desperately tries to wash Fred's blood from her body. June goes to the Lake Ontario shore, and comes to terms with her actions, feeling both joy and regret. She thinks of Hannah. Then she goes to the police station and confesses to murdering Fred, but as the murder took place in no man's land, June is not charged. However, she is fined $88 for mailing Fred's finger to the ICC detention facility. June confesses to Luke that she loved killing Fred and to Moira that she is scared of her eagerness for violent revenge. Moira tells June she is afraid of her and is uncertain about June taking care of Holly by herself. Serena is informed of Fred’s demise and Tuello gives her details of his murder. After viewing Fred's body at the morgue, Serena witnesses a candlelit vigil being held in his memory. Upon seeing this, she demands to return to Gilead with her husband so that she can bury him there - presumably hoping to free herself from Canadian judgement.
48	2	"Ballet"	Elisabeth Moss	Nina Fiore & John Herrera	September 14, 2022
Serena returns to Gilead for Fred's funeral. She pressures Commander Lawrence to make it a huge televised event, to show the world how Gilead honors its leaders. As Luke and June leave a theater, they see Hannah prominently displayed on the city's jumbotrons, presenting Serena with flowers, an orchestrated message from Serena to June. Esther shares some chocolates she stole from Commander Putnam with Janine, which she secretly poisoned to kill them both. As they are eating, Esther tells Janine she hates her, as she acts for Gilead. They are discovered choking on blood by Aunt Lydia.
49	3	"Border"	Dana Gonzales	Aly Monroe	September 21, 2022
A distraught Aunt Lydia prays for Janine's recovery, promising God that she will be more compassionate to the handmaids if she recovers. Janine emerges from her coma. June arranges a phone call and Nick informs her that he is now married. Nick tells her that the plum-colored dress worn by Hannah at Fred Waterford's funeral means that Hannah is now attending a "wives" school. Although she wants to stay in Gilead, Serena is told by the High Commanders that they want her to serve as a diplomat for Gilead in Toronto to paint a positive image of the country, and because her status as a high-ranking, unwed mother makes her ill-fitted to Gilead's caste system.
50	4	"Dear Offred"	Dana Gonzales	Jacey Heldrich	September 28, 2022
A supporter of the Sons of Jacob sees June in a park and the two verbally battle one another. Janine is able to walk after doing physical therapy. Lydia condemns Esther for the suicide/murder attempt but Janine doesn't. She finally tells Lydia the truth; the women imprisoned by Lydia hate her. Serena is released from custody of the government and commences her efforts to erect a Gilead Cultural Center in Toronto. June receives an invitation from Serena via mail to attend the grand opening of the Gilead Cultural Center and Luke subsequently arranges to meet Serena in order to tell her that he is attempting to have the embassy closed. June later arrives at the embassy amidst an argument between Sons of Jacob supporters and those protesting them including Moira, Danielle and Tyler. After a loyalist punches Moira in the face, June fires a gun in the air. Serena is rushed out the back of the building by her bodyguard, but they run into the fleeing June and Luke. June has an opportunity to shoot Serena, but freezes when she sees Serena's pregnancy and runs away instead.
51	5	"Fairytale"	Eva Vives	J. Holtham	October 5, 2022
June and Luke embark on a dangerous quest into No Man's Land to meet a Guardian who has information about the Wives' school that Hannah is attending. They meet the Guardian and spend the night drinking and listening to music with him in an abandoned bowling alley. They take a shortcut back to Canada, but the Guardian steps on a landmine alerting others to their presence. Luke and June run for the border, but are apprehended by men in black trucks. Meanwhile, Serena gets to know her new hosts, the Wheelers, who seem a little too interested in her pregnancy. Putnam and Lawrence discuss the future of Gilead, which Lawrence wants to liberalize with a plan he calls "New Bethlehem", while Putnam insists no such plan will ever happen in Gilead.
52	6	"Together"	Eva Vives	Katherine Collins	October 12, 2022
Serena's obstetrician invites Serena to dinner. Serena and Mrs. Wheeler get into an argument after Serena expresses a desire to remain a widow rather than remarrying; Serena is told to go to her room. June and Luke are captured by Commander Wheeler's guard in No Man's Land. When Luke tries to resist, he is beaten. Commander Wheeler informs Serena that June has been captured and Serena pleads to visit No Man's Land to witness her execution. Luke is dumped by Commander Wheeler's troops near the border, while June is taken to meet Ezra and Serena. Serena asks Ezra for the gun to execute June, but instead shoots Ezra and orders June to drive the car while she enters into labor. Back in Gilead, Esther learns that she is pregnant and Lydia wishes to know how, as she doesn’t have a posting. Esther tells her that she was raped by Commander Putnam. After Lydia reports the incident to Commander Lawrence, who states his failure to see the distinction between it and the Ceremony much to Lydia's chagrin, Commander Putnam is arrested on Lawrence and Nick's orders and summarily executed by the latter, in front of Naomi. It is also revealed that Nick’s wife Rose is pregnant.
53	7	"No Man's Land"	Natalia Leite	Rachel Shukert	October 19, 2022
As they drive through no man's land, Serena's contractions increase in frequency. The two take refuge in a barn. June attempts to leave in the car after Serena lashes out, but then decides to stay, helping deliver the baby, Noah. Serena develops a fever and June insists that they return to Canada. Serena initially refuses, insisting she was merely a vessel to deliver Noah to a mother who deserves him, such as June. June takes Serena to a Canadian hospital. While Serena is treated, June uses the phone to call Moira, who sends Luke to pick her up. On their way out, immigration officers, called by Luke, enter the hospital and arrest Serena for entering the country illegally, telling her that she will be detained, and Noah will be placed with child services. Serena cries hysterically and begs June for help. In flashbacks, June attends a fellow handmaid's birth where the handmaid experiences complications, and her baby is delivered via C-section just before she dies. June along with Janine, Alma, Brianna and the other handmaids are forced to stay in the room and pray. As the mourning handmaids leave the house, June sees Serena celebrating the birth of the baby with the other Wives.
54	8	"Motherland"	Natalia Leite	Yahlin Chang	October 26, 2022
As anti-refugee sentiment builds in Canada, Luke and June wonder if staying in Canada is the right choice. Commander Lawrence establishes his settlement of New Bethlehem on an island, where he says Gileadean refugees will be able to return and live freely as a way of easing diplomatic tensions. He travels to Toronto, where he offers June the chance to move to New Bethlehem and promises to move Hannah there too after she is married. While June strongly considers this offer, Luke vehemently rejects it. A DVD arrives in the mail with a video of Hannah's Wife school on it. Mark Tuello and the Americans use the video to track Hannah's location and tell June they will conduct a military raid and rescue the girls. Meanwhile, Serena is in immigration detention, where she pumps breast milk to give to the Wheelers to feed Noah, as they are his foster family now. Lawrence tells Serena he can get her out, but only on the condition that she stay with the Wheelers to breastfeed Noah. She calls June, who tells her they are not friends and she should move back in with the Wheelers and plot her own revenge. Serena is released into the Wheelers' custody, who admonish her for being a bad mother before allowing her to feed Noah.
55	9	"Allegiance"	Bradley Whitford	Eric Tuchman	November 2, 2022
The military raid on Hannah's school ends in tragedy as the fighter jets are shot down by Gileadean air defense. Lawrence calls June, claiming the incident was in self defense and asks her again to join New Bethlehem, but she refuses and reveals her involvement in the death of Lawrence's late wife Eleanor. Tuello asks June to convince Nick to be a mole for the Canadians within Gilead. Upon their meeting, Nick reveals his desire to improve Gilead's international image, ultimately declining the Canadian offer and professing his continued love for June, who reciprocates. To increase his position of power and protect her from Gileadean law, Lawrence asks Naomi Putnam to become his new wife. Elsewhere, Serena asks Commander Wheeler to use her image with Noah at the reopening of the Gilead Cultural Center in Toronto to persuade Canadians to join Gilead, which he agrees to, much to Mrs. Wheeler's outrage. As Serena is about to be sent back home without Noah, she escapes with him with help from the Wheelers' Martha. The memorial service for the lost American pilots is disrupted by the continued anti-refugee protests, which suddenly ends in gunfire aimed at June.
56	10	"Safe"	Elisabeth Moss	Bruce Miller	November 9, 2022
June feels uneasy in Canada as anti-refugee sentiment increases, but Luke reassures her that they're fine. As she is walking outside, a truck with a Gileadean bumper sticker runs into her before running over her arm. Before the truck can kill her, Luke beats the driver severely and June is rushed to the hospital. Meanwhile, Nick worries more and more about June's safety, knowing that Gilead will not stop until she is dead. He decides to accept Tuello's offer of being a mole in order to protect June. After visiting June in the hospital, Nick returns to Gilead and punches Lawrence at his wedding, blaming him for the attack. While Nick is in jail, Rose visits him and says that she knew he still loved June and she is done with him. Janine is told by Aunt Lydia that she will be posted with Commander Lawrence and Naomi. Initially open to the idea of spending more time with her daughter, Janine lashes out at Naomi when she is called "Ofjoseph" by her, telling Naomi that that is not her name and that she hates her. Janine is arrested along with a Martha from Lawrence's household who was seen giving Janine information about June's safety. The driver who attacked June dies as a result of Luke's beating, and Rita informs him that the Toronto police will arrest him. Luke brushes it off but June insists that they must leave. They plan to fly from Toronto to Honolulu via Anchorage, but Tuello arrives to inform them that the police will be waiting at the airport. He offers them travel documents and passage on a train bound for Vancouver, from where they can take a boat to Hawaii. While in the queue at the train station, the two see police checking documents. Realizing June and Nichole cannot get to safety with him, Luke stays behind and is arrested while they board the train. While on the train, June hears another baby cry and finds Serena and Noah on the train as well.

=== Season 6 (2025) ===
No. overall	No. in season	Title	Directed by	Written by	Original release date
57	1	"Train"	Elisabeth Moss	Nika Castillo and Bruce Miller	April 8, 2025
On the train, June and Serena are now headed to Alaska. June and other former Handmaids and Marthas share their traumas. Serena disguises her real identity, but when a doctor checks on June’s broken arm, he recognizes Serena and calls her out, leading the other women to verbally attack her. An officer arrives and claims her papers are legal, intending to leave Serena to the women, though June insists that he arrest Serena to protect her. As the women corner Serena, June pulls the emergency brake, stopping the train. Serena and June rush into the next wagon, but the women begin breaking the glass on the door. June then urges Serena to jump off the train with Noah. Serena hesitates, so June pushes her off. The women call June a traitor. Meanwhile, Moira meets with Tuello, who reveals that the U.S. Embassy is closing. Moira volunteers to join Mayday and the cause. Nick returns to New Bethlehem and his wife, having been released after his altercation with Lawrence. Commander Wharton, his father-in-law, informs him that he'll be staying for a while. The next day, June wakes up to an empty train in Alaska. In line for processing at a settlement populated by U.S. citizens, she encounters her mother Holly, who she thought dead. They embrace.
58	2	"Exile"	Elisabeth Moss	J. Holtham	April 8, 2025
June reconciles with her mother. Serena finds refuge in a church-sponsored community of women and children. Luke is released; Tuello and Moira inform him his hearing will take place in up to four months. He joins Mayday along with Moira. Nick and Wharton meet with Lawrence, and they agree to invite Serena to New Bethlehem to promote it. June contacts Luke, Rita and Moira, revealing that Holly is alive. Tuello meets with Nick and asks for information on Gilead patrols. Two months later, June fails to contact Luke but learns from Mark that Moira and Luke joined Mayday and are trapped in no man's land. After a conversation with Wharton, Nick burns the flash drive Tuello gave him. Serena enters into a discussion with the head of the Christian community, who reveals that she knew her true identity all along, and expresses disagreement with Gilead; she encourages Serena to challenge the brutality in Gilead. Lawrence and Naomi arrive, and he persuades Serena to return to New Bethlehem. Serena says grace and after praying, she thanks the community for housing her and Noah, subsequently declaring that God has chosen her to bring reform to Gilead. June argues with her mother Holly about returning to save Moira and Luke. She leaves, and Nichole stays with her grandmother Holly.
59	3	"Devotion"	David Lester	Nina Fiore & John Herrera	April 8, 2025
After being taken by Eyes following her spat with Naomi, Janine is found by Aunt Lydia in a Jezebels brothel with other former handmaids, but she prefers this new life over her old one in servitude. Lydia visits Lawrence in New Bethlehem to plead for Janine's release, though he and Naomi refuse. Representatives from across the globe visit New Bethlehem to see if working relations can be made with Gilead. Among them is a messenger from June, who tells Nick to meet her in no man's land. They reunite, where June convinces Nick to help her save Moira and Luke. Lawrence, Serena, and Wharton win over the global representatives by showcasing the modern Gilead town, as well as their increase in birthrate due to their laws. In private, however, Wharton remains unsure of future settlements like New Bethlehem. In no man's land, June and Nick arrive at an abandoned water park, avoiding Gilead's patrolling Guardians and locate Moira and Luke in a gift shop. As they all escape, they are found by a Guardian patrol, but Nick seemingly kills him before they drive away in his car. As they're released back to Mayday, Nick's attempt at a final "goodbye" to June changes when she suggests they say instead "see you later".
60	4	"Promotion"	Natalia Leite	Jacey Heldrich	April 15, 2025
Working with Mayday, Luke is informed by Tuello that his charges were dropped so long as he leaves Canada. He and Moira then plan the next offensive against Gilead by striking Commanders within a Jezebels brothel, which is against June's wish to return with them to Alaska. Arriving in New Bethlehem, Rita, former Martha of the Waterford's household, is reunited with her sister and Nick, who promises the town is reformed. Elsewhere, Lawrence is promoted to High Commander and celebrates at a Jezebels, where he meets Janine. In private, he promises that her daughter, Charlotte, who is being raised by the Lawrence family, will be protected in the future. When June realizes Janine is in a targeted Jezebels, she volunteers to infiltrate and warn the women of the attack in Moira's place, angering her and Luke by insinuating they aren't ready to fight Gilead. In New Bethlehem, Wharton relays his new belief in its system to Serena, and while walking her home, attempts to court her before they are interrupted by Aunt Lydia. Later, Luke returns to June and promises that together, they can take all of Gilead down.
61	5	"Janine"	Natalia Leite	Ubah Mohamed	April 22, 2025
With the help of Luke and Ellen, Mayday's leader, June and Moira infiltrate the Jezebel penthouse as Marthas to find Janine. They warn her of an upcoming Mayday attack to kill the Commanders who frequent there. Upon leaving, however, a Guardian stops them and confiscates the letters and a map Janine gave them. He then attempts to rape Moira, forcing them to kill him which triggers a building-wide lockdown. In the penthouse, Lawrence insults Bell, a young and narcissistic Commander, over his treatment of Janine. Later, with Janine's help, Lawrence eavesdrops on the other Commanders, overhearing Bell's intentions to execute him and revert Gilead back to its original, anti-progressive state. Meanwhile, Nick learns from Wharton that one of the Guardians he shot in no man's land is recovering in a coma, forcing him to visit the hospital to finish the job. In New Bethlehem, Wharton promises to build a library named after Serena as a wedding gift, which she accepts. While waiting to pick up June and Moira, a Guardian confronts Luke and Ellen at the pick-up point, ordering them to leave. When Luke tries to stall for time, the Guardian knocks him out, forcing June and Moira (who have been watching through a door window) to flee. They find Lawrence in the parking lot and ask for his help. He hides them in his trunk, but doesn't tell them where he's taking them.
62	6	"Surprise"	Natalia Leite	Aly Monroe	April 29, 2025
Lawrence takes June and Moira to his home, where the two request to be taken to the Canadian border. The duo realize, however, that letters from the women at the Jezebels brothel remain in the safe. While Lawrence takes Moira to the border, June telephones Nick, who agrees to obtain the letters and retrieve her. Though Wharton was supposed to be in Washington, D.C., Nick sees him in the window of his house when returning home. Nick instructs June to go to Serena's house in New Bethlehem where Serena offers her a room to stay. Wharton interrogates Nick as to where he was, as well the coincidental death of the comatose Guardian, forcing Nick to confess that he was at Jezebels, though Wharton demands why. Elsewhere, Aunt Lydia visits Janine, stating that she opened a pathway for Janine to work at a fertility center in New Bethlehem, though Janine rebuffs Aunt Lydia's overtures. In the morning, Serena cooks breakfast for June and surprises her with a visit from Rita. Nick comes and asks June to move with him to Paris, stating that he obtained documents for the two of them. During this encounter, Wharton knocks on the door so June and Nick hide in the closet. As the two listen to Serena and Wharton speak, Wharton reveals that Nick discovered the plan of Operation Mayday to kill the Commanders at the brothel; June is distressed as she listens to this, staring at Nick, who looks away.
63	7	"Shattered"	Daina Reid	Katherine Collins	May 6, 2025
Guardians of Gilead execute the Jezebels, though Janine is spared at the behest of Commander Bell. Aunt Lydia visits the brothel and sees the blood-stained walls, causing her sorrow that her former Handmaids are gone. She is relieved to hear Janine survived, though Bell is torturing her at his residence and restricts her from any outside contact. Nick drops June off near the border where she expresses anger at his supposed betrayal. Upon returning to Mayday, she is admonished by the group, including Luke, for giving Nick details of the Jezebels plan which ended in ruins. Rita pays Nick a visit, though he states that he can no longer help rescue her family members. At her bridal shower, Serena's new ideas regarding New Bethlehem are dismissed by other wives who believe in Gilead's original vision. To gain influence, she and Wharton plan their wedding and expand their guest list to include the Handmaids in order to represent the entire Gilead community. Lawrence arrives at Mayday and informs the Americans of this, who plan to attack the nuptial service. June and Moira are driven to a Red Center in Boston where they seek refuge at the invitation of Aunt Phoebe who is involved in Mayday. They pray Psalm 23 as they await their plan to free the Handmaids.
64	8	"Exodus"	Daina Reid	Yahlin Chang	May 13, 2025
June and Moira smuggle switchblades for distribution to the Handmaids during Serena and Wharton's wedding ceremony. After the wedding, the Handmaids return to their Commanders' homes and the Red Center. The posted Handmaids kill their Commanders who were put in a deep sleep from the wedding cake made and laced with a sedative by Rita. Likewise, June kills Bell and reunites with Janine. At Wharton's residence, Serena is distraught to see a Handmaid waiting for them and laments to have trusted him. After a heated argument, he lets Serena and Noah leave into the night. At the Red Center, Lydia discovers the Handmaids and Aunt Phoebe helping them, but Moira, June, and Janine approach Lydia, persuading her that God would not have wanted women to live under Gilead's regime. Lydia prays to God for help, while June, Moira, and the Handmaids run through the streets of Boston in the night.
65	9	"Execution"	Elisabeth Moss	Eric Tuchman	May 20, 2025
Serena runs through the streets of Boston, witnessing the city in mayhem and taking refuge at Lawrence's. June, Moira, Janine, Aunt Phoebe–actually a CIA agent named Ava–and the Handmaids are arrested on Wharton's commands just before fleeing Boston to be publicly executed before the citizens of Gilead. Both June and Aunt Lydia, who was sentenced as well, defy Gilead with their last words, and June's speech convinces the crowds to rebel, while Luke, Rita, and other members of Mayday intervene with weapons. Wharton escapes the scene and all the apprehended are saved as American troops arrive. Tuello saves Serena, and June convinces her to reveal the High Commanders' plan to fly to D.C. Lawrence, joined by June, is persuaded to plant a bomb on the plane, but when the other Commanders arrive early, Lawrence sacrifices himself and joins them with the bomb to make their plan succeed. At the last minute, Nick boards the plane as well, after being persuaded by his wife, Rose, to avenge the death of the commanders and exact revenge on June. Rose blames her early labor on the sedative-laced wedding cake masterminded by June. A distraught June watches on as the plane ascends and explodes in the sky.
66	10	"The Handmaid's Tale"	Elisabeth Moss	Bruce Miller	May 27, 2025
With the death of all of the Boston Commanders, the city is quickly liberated by the rebels and American forces. In the aftermath, June forgives Serena before Serena and Noah are sent to a UN refugee camp by Tuello who reveals that he holds the rank of Commander in the US military. June has a surprise reunion with Emily who has spent the last seven months fighting in the rebellion in Bridgeport, Connecticut. June is taken to the new border with Gilead where Janine is released. Naomi Lawrence and Aunt Lydia, who was released by the Eyes, also appear and return Charlotte to Janine. Before parting ways, June thanks Lydia for bringing them to the border. Luke and June both dedicate themselves to the continuing fight to defeat Gilead, Luke with Mayday and June with Tuello. They promise to meet again 'after'. At the encouragement of both Holly and Luke to write a book chronicling her story, June returns to the ruins of the Waterford house where she climbs the stairs to her old room and begins to record her story as Offred.
