= 2019 American Society of Cinematographers Awards =

Media awards ceremony in Los Angeles, US

34th ASC Awards
- Date: January 25, 2020
- Site: Hollywood & Highland Ray Dolby Ballroom

The 34th American Society of Cinematographers Awards were held on January 25, 2020, at the Hollywood & Highland Ray Dolby Ballroom, honoring the best cinematographers of film and television in 2019.

The nominees were announced on January 2, 2020.

== Nominees ==
=== Film ===
==== Outstanding Achievement in Cinematography in Theatrical Release ====
- Roger Deakins, ASC, BSC – 1917
  - Phedon Papamichael, ASC, GSC – Ford v Ferrari
  - Rodrigo Prieto, ASC, AMC – The Irishman
  - Robert Richardson, ASC – Once Upon a Time in Hollywood
  - Lawrence Sher, ASC – Joker

==== Spotlight Award ====
The Spotlight Award recognizes outstanding cinematography in features and documentaries that are typically screened at film festivals, in limited theatrical release, or outside the United States.

- Jarin Blaschke – The Lighthouse
  - Natasha Braier, ASC, ADF – Honey Boy
  - Jasper Wolf, NSC – Monos

==== Outstanding Achievement in Cinematography in Documentary ====
- Fejmi Daut and Samir Ljuma – Honeyland
  - Nicholas de Pencier – Anthropocene: The Human Epoch
  - Evangelia Kranioti – Obscuro Barroco

=== Television ===
==== Outstanding Achievement in Cinematography in Regular Series for Non-Commercial Television ====
- Colin Watkinson, ASC, BSC – The Handmaid's Tale (Episode: "Night") (Hulu)
  - David Luther – Das Boot (Episode: "Gegen die Zeit") (Sky)
  - M. David Mullen, ASC – The Marvelous Mrs. Maisel (Episode: "Simone") (Amazon)
  - Chris Seager, BSC – Carnival Row (Episode: "Grieve No More") (Amazon)
  - Brendan Steacy, CSC – Titans (Episode: "Dick Grayson") (DC Universe)

==== Outstanding Achievement in Cinematography in Regular Series for Commercial Television ====
- C. Kim Miles, CSC, MySC – Project Blue Book (Episode: "The Flatwoods Monster") (History)
  - Dana Gonzales, ASC – Legion (Episode: "Chapter 20") (FX)
  - Polly Morgan, ASC, BSC – Legion (Episode: "Chapter 23") (FX)
  - Peter Robertson, ISC – Vikings (Episode: "Hell") (History)
  - David Stockton, ASC – Gotham (Episode: "Ace Chemicals") (FOX)

==== Outstanding Achievement in Cinematography in Motion Picture, Miniseries, or Pilot Made for Television ====
- John Conroy, ISC – The Terror: Infamy (Episode: "A Sparrow in a Swallow's Nest") (AMC)
  - P.J. Dillon, ISC – The Rook (Episode: "Chapter 1") (Starz)
  - Chris Manley, ASC – Doom Patrol (DC Universe)*
  - Martin Ruhe, ASC – Catch-22 (Episode: "Episode 5") (Hulu)
  - Craig Wrobleski, CSC – The Twilight Zone (Episode: "Blurryman") (CBS All Access)

=== Other awards ===
- Lifetime Achievement Award: Frederick Elmes, ASC
- Career Achievement in Television Award: Donald A. Morgan, ASC
- International Award: Bruno Delbonnel, ASC, AFC
- Presidents Award: Don McCuaig, ASC
