= Elisabeth Williams =

American art director, production designer and set decorator

- Occupation(s): Art director, production designer, set decorator

Elisabeth Williams is a Canadian art director, production designer and set decorator. She won three Primetime Emmy Awards and was nominated for three more in the category Outstanding Production Design.

== Selected television ==
- Fargo (2015; nominated)
- The Handmaid's Tale (2017; nominated)
- The Handmaid's Tale (2017; won)
- The Handmaid's Tale (2018; won)
- The Handmaid's Tale (2019; won)
- The Handmaid's Tale (2020; nominated)
