= The Handmaid's Tale (TV series) =

American dystopian television series

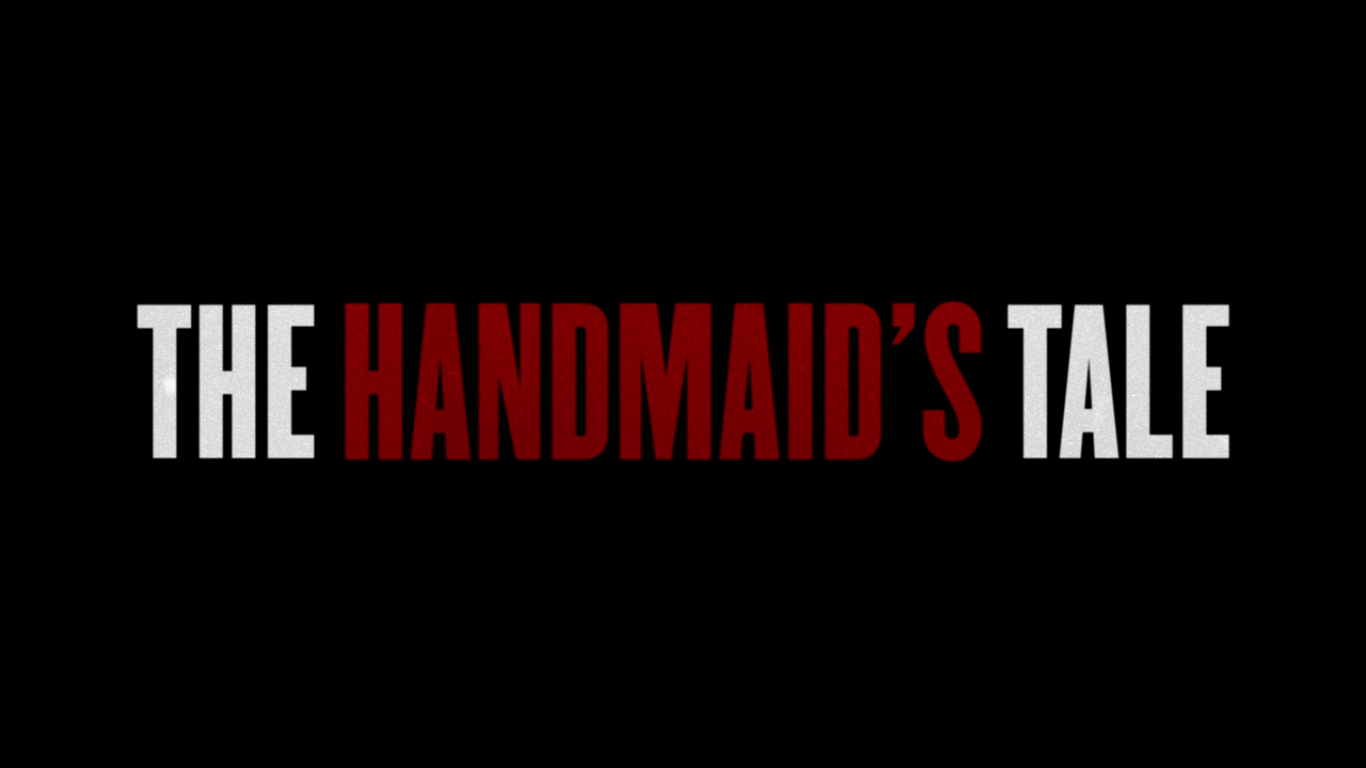
- Genre: Tragedy; Dystopia
- Created by: Bruce Miller
- Based on: The Handmaid's Tale by Margaret Atwood
- Starring: Elisabeth Moss; Joseph Fiennes; Yvonne Strahovski; Alexis Bledel; Madeline Brewer; Ann Dowd; O-T Fagbenle; Max Minghella; Samira Wiley; Amanda Brugel; Bradley Whitford; Sam Jaeger; Ever Carradine
- Composer: Adam Taylor
- Country of origin: United States
- Original language: English
- No. of seasons: 6
- No. of episodes: 66 (list of episodes)

Production
- Executive producers: Bruce Miller; Warren Littlefield; Reed Morano; Daniel Wilson; Fran Sears; Ilene Chaiken; Elisabeth Moss; Mike Barker; Eric Tuchman; Yahlin Chang; Sheila Hockin; John Weber; Kim Todd; Frank Siracusa; Dorothy Fortenberry
- Producers: Nina Fiore; John Herrera; Kim Todd; Joseph Boccia
- Production locations: Greater Toronto and Hamilton Area; Washington, D.C.
- Cinematography: Colin Watkinson; Zoë White; Stuart Biddlecombe; Nicola Daley; Stuart Campbell
- Running time: 41–65 minutes
- Production companies: Daniel Wilson Productions, Inc.; The Littlefield Company; White Oak Pictures; Toluca Pictures; MGM Television

Original release
- Network: Hulu
- Release: April 26, 2017 – May 27, 2025

Related
- The Testaments

The Handmaid's Tale is an American dystopian television series created by Bruce Miller, based on the 1985 novel The Handmaid's Tale by Canadian author Margaret Atwood. The series was ordered by the streaming service Hulu as a straight-to-series order of ten episodes, for which production began in late 2016. The plot features a dystopia following a Second American Civil War wherein a theonomic, totalitarian society subjects fertile women, called "Handmaids", to child-bearing slavery.

The series premiered on April 26, 2017, and was renewed for five additional seasons, with the sixth and final season premiering on April 8, 2025. Its first season won eight Primetime Emmy Awards from 13 nominations, including Outstanding Drama Series. It was the first show produced by Hulu to win a major award and the first series on a streaming service to win an Emmy for Outstanding Series. It also won the Golden Globe Award for Best Television Series – Drama. Elisabeth Moss was awarded the Primetime Emmy Award for Outstanding Lead Actress in a Drama Series and the Golden Globe for Best Actress in a Television Drama Series.

A sequel series based on Atwood's 2019 sequel novel The Testaments premiered in April 2026 on Hulu.

== Plot ==
In a world where fertility rates have collapsed as a result of sexually transmitted diseases and environmental pollution, the totalitarian, theonomic Republic of Gilead has established its rule in the former United States in the aftermath of a mysterious terrorist attack on the US government, leading to the outbreak of a devastating civil war. Society is organized by power-hungry leaders along with a new, militarized, hierarchical theonomy and newly created social classes, in which women are brutally subjugated. By law, women in Gilead are forced to work in severely limited roles, including as sex slaves, and they are not allowed to own property, have careers, handle money, or even read and write (apart from the Aunts).

Worldwide infertility has led to the enslavement of fertile women in Gilead determined by the new regime to be fallen women, citing an extremist interpretation of the Biblical account of Bilhah. These women often include those who have entered marriages following divorce (termed "adulteresses", as divorce is not recognized under Gileadian law), single or unmarried mothers, lesbians (homosexuals being termed "gender traitors"), non-Christians, adherents of Christian denominations other than the "Sons of Jacob", political dissidents, and academics.

These women, called Handmaids, are assigned to the homes of the ruling elite, where they must submit to ritualized rape (referred to as "the ceremony") by their male masters ("Commanders") in the presence of their wives with the intent of being impregnated and bearing children for them. Handmaids are given names created by the addition of the prefix Of- to the first name of the man who has them. When they are transferred, their names are changed.

Along with the Handmaids, much of society is now grouped into classes that dictate their freedoms and duties. Women are divided into a small range of social categories, each one signified by a plain dress in a specific color. A Handmaid’s outfit consists of a long red dress, a red cloak, heavy brown boots, and a white coif, with a larger white bonnet (known as "wings") to be worn outside, which conceals her from the public view and restricts her vision.

June Osborne, renamed Offred, is the Handmaid assigned to the home of the Gileadan Commander Fred Waterford and his wife Serena Joy, key players in the formation and rise of Gilead, who struggle with the realities of the society they helped create. During "the time before", June was married to Luke and had a daughter, Hannah.

At the beginning of the story, while attempting to flee Gilead with her husband and daughter, June was captured and forced to become a Handmaid because of the "adultery" she and her husband committed. June's daughter was taken and given to an upper-class family to raise, and her husband escaped into Canada. Much of the plot revolves around June's desire to be reunited with her husband and daughter and the internal evolution of her strength to its somewhat darker version.

== Cast and characters ==
=== Main ===
- Elisabeth Moss as June Osborne / Offred / Ofjoseph #2, a woman who was captured while attempting to escape to Canada with her husband, Luke, and daughter, Hannah. Because Luke is divorced, their union is considered adulterous in this new society. June is considered an adulteress and their daughter, Hannah, is deemed illegitimate. Due to June's fertility, she is made a Handmaid to Commander Fred Waterford and his wife Serena Joy, and is called "Offred"; later she becomes handmaid to Commander Joseph Lawrence and is called "Ofjoseph".
- Joseph Fiennes as Commander Fred Waterford (seasons 1–4), a high-ranking government official, and June's first master. Both he and his wife were instrumental in Gilead's founding.
- Yvonne Strahovski as Serena Joy Waterford, Fred's wife, and a former conservative cultural activist and author. She appears to have accepted her new role in a society that she helped create. She is poised and deeply religious, but capable of great cruelty and is often callous to June. She is desperate to become a mother.
- Alexis Bledel as Dr. Emily Malek / Ofglen #1 / Ofsteven / Ofroy / Ofjoseph #1 (seasons 1–4, guest season 6), a former university professor in cellular biology and initially June's shopping partner. Although June is initially wary of her, it is revealed she is not as pious as she seems, and the two become friends. Emily is involved with and first informs June of Mayday, an underground resistance movement. She has a wife and son living in Canada.
- Madeline Brewer as Janine Lindo / Ofwarren / Ofdaniel / Ofhoward / Ofjoseph / Ofpaul #3, a Handmaid who entered the Red Center for training at the same time as June, and considers June a friend due to her kind treatment. Initially non-compliant, Janine has her right eye removed as a punishment. She becomes mentally unstable due to her treatment and often behaves in temperamental or childlike ways. Before Gilead, Janine was a waitress and had a son, Caleb, who unbeknownst to her was killed in a car crash after the takeover.
- Ann Dowd as Aunt Lydia Clements, a woman in charge of overseeing the Handmaids in their sexual re-education and duties. She is brutal and subjects insubordinate Handmaids to sadistic physical punishment, but she also cares for her charges and believes deeply in the Gileadean mission and doctrine. She appears to have a soft spot for Janine and even goes so far as to address her by her given name on occasion. Before Gilead, she was a family court judge, and afterwards, an elementary school teacher.
- O-T Fagbenle as Luke Bankole, June's husband from before Gilead. Initially, June believes he was killed, but it is later revealed that Luke managed to escape to Canada.
- Max Minghella as Commander Nick Blaine, Commander Waterford's driver and a former drifter from Michigan who has feelings for June. June and Nick develop an intimate relationship and she eventually discovers that he is an Eye, a spy for Gilead and that he played a significant role in the Gileadean takeover. In season 3, he is promoted to Commander.
- Samira Wiley as Moira Strand, June's best friend since college. She is already at the Red Center when June enters Handmaid training but escapes before being assigned to a home. She is recaptured and becomes "Ruby", a Jezebel. She seems to have given up hope of ever being free, but on meeting June again regains the conviction to escape to Canada.
- Amanda Brugel as Rita Blue (seasons 2–6, recurring season 1), a housekeeper at the Waterford house, who becomes one of June's closest allies. She had a son named Matthew, who died fighting in the civil war when he was 19 years old.
- Bradley Whitford as Commander Joseph Lawrence (seasons 3–6, guest season 2), the founder of the Colonies and architect of Gilead's economy. He is on and off with Mayday.
- Sam Jaeger as Mark Tuello (seasons 4–6, recurring season 3, guest season 2), an operative of the U.S. Government whom Serena encounters in Canada.
- Ever Carradine as Naomi Putnam (season 6, recurring seasons 1–5), Commander Putnam's wife. She has no sympathy for Handmaids and only sees her baby as a status symbol. She later marries Commander Lawrence after a change in circumstances.

=== Recurring ===
- Jordana Blake as Hannah Bankole, June and Luke's daughter. After being taken, she is given a new family and renamed Agnes MacKenzie.
- Stephen Kunken as Commander Warren Putnam (seasons 1–5), a High Commander and the first known Commander of Janine.
- Tattiawna Jones as Lillie Fuller / Ofglen #2 (seasons 1–2), who replaces Emily in the position after Emily is captured by the Eyes. She warns June away from breaking the rules and does not wish to upset the status quo, but this is because she believes her life as a Handmaid is better than the difficult, impoverished life she led prior to Gilead, rather than out of religious piety.
- Nina Kiri as Alma / Ofrobert (seasons 1–4, guest seasons 5–6), another Handmaid who trained at the Red Center with June, Moira, and Janine. She is frank and chatty and often trades gossip and news with June. She is also involved with Mayday and becomes one of June's first contacts with the resistance group.
- Bahia Watson as Brianna / Oferic (seasons 1–4, guest seasons 5–6), another local Handmaid who is friends with June. She is Dolores's shopping partner.
- Jenessa Grant as Dolores / Ofsamuel (seasons 1–2, guest season 3), a local Handmaid with a friendly and talkative nature. She is Brianna's shopping partner.
- Edie Inksetter as Aunt Elizabeth, a fellow Aunt who works closely with Aunt Lydia at the Red Center.
- Robert Curtis Brown as Commander Andrew Pryce (seasons 1–2), a Commander who is one of the leading members of the Sons of Jacob and is in charge of the Eyes.
- Kristen Gutoskie as Beth (seasons 1 and 3, guest season 4), an award-winning chef before the rise of Gilead, formerly a Martha at Jezebel's, and later a Martha in the Lawrence household.
- Erin Way as Erin (seasons 1–3), a young, apparently mute woman who was being trained to become a Handmaid but managed to escape to Canada with Luke.
- Krista Morin as Rachel Tapping (seasons 1–2, season 4), an official at the United States Consulate in Canada.
- Clea DuVall as Sylvia (season 3, guest seasons 2 and 5), Emily's wife.
- Cherry Jones as Holly Maddox (seasons 2–3, season 6), June's mother, an outspoken feminist.
- Sydney Sweeney as Eden Blaine (née Spencer) (season 2), a pious and obedient young girl who is married off to Nick.
- Greg Bryk as Commander Ray Cushing (season 2), a fellow Commander who later replaces Commander Pryce's position.
- Rohan Mead as Isaac (season 2), a young Guardian assigned to the Waterford home.
- Julie Dretzin as Eleanor Lawrence (seasons 2–3), the mentally unstable wife of Commander Lawrence.
- Amy Landecker as Mrs. Mackenzie (season 5, guest season 3), Hannah's placement mother in Gilead.
- Ashleigh LaThrop as Natalie / Ofmatthew (season 3), a devoted Handmaid whose loyalty to Gilead causes divisive tensions amongst her peers.
- Sugenja Sri as Sienna (season 3, guest season 4), a former radiology student and a new Martha in the Lawrence household.
- Jonathan Watton as Commander Matthew Calhoun (seasons 3–6), the assigned Commander of Natalie/Ofmatthew.
- Charlie Zeltzer as Oliver (seasons 3–4), Emily and Sylvia's son.
- Christopher Meloni as High Commander George Winslow (season 3), a High Commander stationed in Washington, D.C.
- Elizabeth Reaser as Olivia Winslow (season 3), the wife of High Commander Winslow.
- Mckenna Grace as Esther Keyes (seasons 4–5), a farmer and the teenage wife of an older Commander.
- Zawe Ashton as Oona (season 4), an aid worker in Toronto and Moira's new girlfriend.
- Jeananne Goossen as Aunt Ruth (season 4), a high ranking Aunt who is desperate to replace Aunt Lydia as the leading Aunt in their district.
- Natasha Mumba as Danielle (seasons 4–5), a former handmaid.
- Victoria Sawal as Tyler (seasons 4–5), a former handmaid.
- Amanda Zhou as Vicky (seasons 4–5), a former handmaid.
- Carey Cox as Rose Blaine (seasons 5–6), the daughter of a High Commander in Washington, D.C. and Nick's new wife.
- Jason Butler Harner as Commander Mackenzie (season 5), a High Commander and Hannah's placement father.
- Rossif Sutherland as Ezra Shaw (season 5), Serena's personal Gileadan bodyguard in Canada.
- Genevieve Angelson as Alanis Wheeler (season 5), an affluent Canadian who idolizes Serena and who is a driving force behind the rise of Gilead in Toronto.
- Lucas Neff as Ryan Wheeler (season 5), Alanis' husband who lives with her in Canada.
- Josh Charles as Commander Wharton (season 6), a High Commander and Nick's father-in-law.
- Athena Karkanis as Ellen (season 6), a leader in Mayday.
- Timothy Simons as Commander Bell (season 6), a High Commander with important family connections.
- D'Arcy Carden as Ava / Aunt Phoebe (season 6), a U.S. government operative posing as an Aunt at the Red Center.

=== Guest ===
- Jim Cummings as Burke (season 1), an Eye who interrogates June in the Waterford home.
- Zabryna Guevara as Mrs. Castillo (season 1), an ambassador from Mexico who visits Gilead to see the effectiveness of the regime.
- Christian Barillas as Mr. Flores (season 1), Mrs. Castillo's assistant.
- Rosa Gilmore as Zoe (season 1), the daughter of a US army soldier and the leader of the group of survivors whom Luke encounters after being separated from June and Hannah.
- Tim Ransom as Mr. Whitford (season 1), a friend of June's mother who helps June, Luke, and Hannah attempt to cross the border.
- Marisa Tomei as Mrs. O'Conner (season 2), a Commander's wife who is exiled to the Colonies as punishment for committing a sin of the flesh.
- Yahya Abdul-Mateen II as Omar (season 2), a man who helps June attempt to escape Gilead.
- John Carroll Lynch as Dan (season 2), Emily's boss at the university where she worked.
- Kelly Jenrette as Annie (season 2), Luke's ex-wife.
- Rebecca Rittenhouse as Odette (season 2), a doctor, and Moira's deceased fiancée.
- Laila Robins as Pamela Joy (season 3), Serena's mother.
- Deidrie Henry as Lori (seasons 3–4), a Martha who Nick uses for intel in Gilead.
- Sarah McVie as Lena (season 3), a Swiss diplomat negotiating the hostile conflict between Gilead and Canada over Nichole.
- Emily Althaus as Noelle (season 3), a young single mother whose son Aunt Lydia taught before the rise of Gilead.
- Laura Vandervoort as Daisy (season 4), a Jezebels worker who aids June.
- Alex Castillo as Dawn Mathis (season 4), the Waterfords' defense attorney.
- Reed Birney as Lieutenant Stans (season 4) a Gilead officer who interrogates June.
- Omar Maskati as Steven (season 4), the leader of a resistance group in Chicago.
- Carly Street as Iris Baker/Aunt Irene (season 4), a former Aunt who attempts to make amends with Emily.
- Christine Ko as Lily (season 5), a former Martha who is now a leader in the Canada-based resistance movement.
- Naomi Snieckus as Abigail (season 6), the leader of a community for women and children in Canada who takes in Serena.

In the second season, Oprah Winfrey has an uncredited appearance as a newsreader on a car radio.

== Episodes ==
Season	Episodes	Originally released	
Season	Episodes	First released	Last released
1	10	April 26, 2017	June 14, 2017
2	13	April 25, 2018	July 11, 2018
3	13	June 5, 2019	August 14, 2019
4	10	April 27, 2021	June 16, 2021
5	10	September 14, 2022	November 9, 2022
6	10	April 8, 2025	May 27, 2025

== Production ==
Development of The Handmaid's Tale began with Ilene Chaiken at Showtime, but the network passed on the pilot, and Chaiken was hired as showrunner for Empire. MGM's Steve Stark was determined to find a female writer, but after difficulty he hired Bruce Miller for his enthusiasm. The strength of the script attracted star Elisabeth Moss and executive producer Warren Littlefield, who together created a straight-to-series order from Hulu, which was announced in April 2016. Based on the 1985 novel of the same name by Margaret Atwood, the series was created by Bruce Miller, who is also an executive producer with Daniel Wilson, Fran Sears, and Warren Littlefield. Atwood serves as consulting producer, giving feedback on some of the areas where the series expands upon or modernizes the book. She also played a small cameo role in the first episode. Moss is also a producer.

In June 2016, Reed Morano was announced as director of the series. Samira Wiley, Max Minghella, and Ann Dowd joined the cast in July 2016. Joseph Fiennes, Madeline Brewer, and Yvonne Strahovski were cast in August 2016, followed by O-T Fagbenle and Amanda Brugel in September 2016. In October 2016, Ever Carradine joined the cast, and Alexis Bledel was added in January 2017. Filming on the series took place in Toronto, Mississauga, Brantford, Hamilton, Burlington, Oakville, and Cambridge, Ontario, from September 2016 to February 2017. Hulu released the first full trailer of the TV series on YouTube, on March 23, 2017. The series premiered on April 26, 2017.

On May 3, 2017, The Handmaid's Tale was renewed for a second season which premiered on April 25, 2018. Moss told the news media that the subsequent episodes would cover further developments in the story, filling in some of the unanswered questions and continuing the narrative already "finished" in the book. The second season consists of 13 episodes and began filming in the fall of 2017. Alexis Bledel returned as a series regular. Showrunner Bruce Miller stated that he envisioned 10 seasons of the show, stating, "Well, you know, honestly, when I started, I tried to game out in my head what would ten seasons be like? If you hit a home run, you want energy to go around the bases, you want enough story to keep going, if you can hook the audience to care about these people enough that they're actually crying at the finale." Season 2 was filmed in Ontario, primarily in Toronto, but some scenes were shot in Hamilton and Cambridge.

On May 2, 2018, Hulu renewed the series for a third season, which premiered on June 5, 2019. Season 3 started production in Toronto in October 2018. Scenes for season 3 were also filmed in Cambridge and Hamilton, Ontario as well as in Washington, D.C. Season 3 saw the show's long-serving Director of Photography, Colin Watkinson, make his directorial debut with the episode "Unknown Caller". Cambridge, Ontario was nominated by the Location Managers Guild International for "Outstanding Film Office" for their work on this season. This was the first time that a Canadian Film Office was nominated for this honor.

On July 26, 2019, the series was renewed for a fourth season. Season 4, consisting of 10 episodes, began production in March 2020, with Elisabeth Moss filming her directorial debut, but work had to be halted after only a few weeks due to the COVID-19 pandemic. In June 2020, Hulu announced that the fourth season would premiere in 2021. Production on season 4 resumed in September 2020 and wrapped on February 25, 2021, with Moss having directed three episodes.

On December 10, 2020, ahead of the fourth season premiere, Hulu renewed the series for a fifth season. Season 5 started production in Toronto in February 2022 and continued through July 2022. In May 2022, Alexis Bledel departed the series ahead of the fifth season, and stated, "After much thought, I felt I had to step away from The Handmaid's Tale".

On September 8, 2022, ahead of the fifth-season premiere, Hulu renewed the series for a sixth and final season. In March 2023, it was reported that Miller had stepped down as showrunner of The Handmaid's Tale, in order to focus on adapting The Testaments for television. Eric Tuchman and Yahlin Chang were named co-showrunners for the sixth and final season, though it was also announced that Miller would remain involved and would write two episodes for the season. Production was originally set to begin in 2023, but was delayed due to the Writers Guild of America and SAG-AFTRA strikes. Filming of the final season began in September 2024 and ended in early February 2025.

== Broadcast and release ==
The first three episodes of the series premiered on April 26, 2017. The subsequent seven episodes were released on a weekly basis. In Canada, the series is broadcast weekly by CTV Drama Channel and the streaming service Crave; the first two episodes premiered on April 30, 2017. In Scandinavia, the series is available on HBO Nordic. In the United Kingdom, the series premiered on May 28, 2017, on Channel 4.

In New Zealand, the series was released on the subscription video on demand service Lightbox on June 8, 2017. After satellite service provider Sky acquired Lightbox and merged it into its streaming service Neon on July 7, 2020, Neon acquired the distribution rights to the series in New Zealand.

In Australia, the series premiered on the TV channel SBS's video streaming service SBS on Demand, on July 6, 2017. The series also released on the subscription video on demand service Stan on December 12, 2018.

In Ireland, the series premiered on February 5, 2018, on RTÉ2, with a showing of the first two episodes. RTÉ also became the first broadcaster in Europe to debut Season 2, Season 3 and Season 4 following its broadcast in the US and Canada. In Brazil and Latin America, the series premiered on March 7, 2018, on Paramount Channel.

In India, the series premiered on February 5, 2018, on AXN and ran for the first two seasons before moving to Amazon Prime Video for Season 3, which made all three seasons available for viewing on January 31, 2020.

In Southeast Asia, Hong Kong, and Taiwan, the series premiered on September 15, 2018, on HBO Asia through HBO Go (now HBO Max).

The first season was released on Blu-ray and DVD on March 13, 2018, the second season on December 4, 2018, and the third season on November 19, 2019, by 20th Century Fox Home Entertainment. The fourth season was released on DVD only (no Blu-ray) on April 5, 2022, by Warner Bros. Home Entertainment.

== Reception ==
=== Critical response ===
Critical response of The Handmaid's Tale
Season	Rotten Tomatoes	Metacritic
1	94% (260 reviews)	92 (41 reviews)
2	90% (339 reviews)	86 (28 reviews)
3	82% (301 reviews)	68 (14 reviews)
4	69% (45 reviews)	62 (18 reviews)
5	80% (31 reviews)	63 (7 reviews)
6	87% (81 reviews)	62 (11 reviews)

The Handmaid's Tale was ranked as the 25th and 38th best TV series of the 21st century by The Guardian and BBC, respectively. On the review aggregator website Rotten Tomatoes, the overall series has an approval rating of 83%. While on Metacritic, another aggregator website, it has an average score of 80 out of 100.

==== Season 1 ====
On Rotten Tomatoes, 94% of 260 reviews are positive for the first season. The site's critical consensus reads: "Haunting and vivid, The Handmaid's Tale is an endlessly engrossing adaptation of Margaret Atwood's dystopian novel that's anchored by a terrific central performance from Elisabeth Moss." On Metacritic, the season has a weighted average score of 92 out of 100 based on 41 critics, indicating "universal acclaim".

Daniel Fienberg of The Hollywood Reporter called it "probably the spring's best new show". Jen Chaney of Vulture gave it a highly positive review, and wrote that it is "A faithful adaptation of the book that also brings new layers to Atwood's totalitarian, sexist world of forced surrogate motherhood" and that "this series is meticulously paced, brutal, visually stunning, and so suspenseful from moment to moment that only at the end of each hour will you feel fully at liberty to exhale".

==== Season 2 ====
On Rotten Tomatoes, 90% of 339 critics have given the season a positive review. The site's critical consensus reads: "Beautifully shot but dishearteningly relevant, The Handmaid's Tale centers its sophomore season tightly around its compelling cast of characters, making room for broader social commentary through more intimate lenses." Metacritic assigned the season a weighted average score of 86 out of 100 based on 28 critics, indicating "universal acclaim".

Some critics perceived the second season's depictions of violence as excessive. The Atlantic's Sophie Gilbert wrote: "There came a point during the first episode where, for me, it became too much." Lisa Miller of The Cut wrote: "I have pressed mute and fast forward so often this season, I am forced to wonder: 'Why am I watching this'? It all feels so gratuitous, like a beating that never ends." The Daily Telegraph's Rebecca Reid admitted she had an anxiety attack watching an episode of the show.

==== Season 3 ====
For the third season, Rotten Tomatoes reports that 82% of 301 reviews are positive. The site's critical consensus reads: "The Handmaid's Tale's third season reins in its horrors and inspires hope that revolution really is possible – if only the story would stop spinning its wheels and get to it already." Metacritic compiled 14 critic reviews and an average score of 68 out of 100, signifying "generally favorable reviews".

Kelly Lawler of USA Today gave it a positive review, scoring it three out of four stars. She claimed it is an improvement over the second season, "that rights many – though definitely not all – of Season 2's wrongs." Overall, she wrote, "The new season is more propulsive and watchable, although it doesn't quite reach the heights of that first moving season. But Handmaid's regains its footing by setting off on a new path". Daniel Fienberg of The Hollywood Reporter wrote a generally positive review, praising Elisabeth Moss's performance and the cinematography, but criticized the plot "that has become frustratingly repetitive". Overall, he wrote, "Still occasionally powerful, but rarely as provocative".

==== Season 4 ====
On Rotten Tomatoes, the fourth season earned positive reviews from 69% of 45 critics. The site's critical consensus reads: "Elisabeth Moss is better than ever, but scattershot plotting and an overbearing sense of doom may prove too grim for some viewers to really enjoy The Handmaid's Tale's fourth season." According to Metacritic, which collected 18 reviews and calculated an average score of 62, the season received "generally favorable reviews".

Kristen Baldwin of Entertainment Weekly gave it a "C+" grade and wrote that the series "delivers on some long-delayed promises, but ultimately it's too little, too late." Matthew Gilbert of The Boston Globe wrote, "the dystopian drama has exceeded the natural lifespan of its story, as it plows forward with nothing new to say, tinkling cymbals and sounding brass." In a more positive review from Jen Chaney of Vulture, she wrote, "Thankfully, season four finally regains some momentum and forward motion. Based on the eight out of ten total episodes made available to critics, this is the best The Handmaid's Tale has been since its first season."

==== Season 5 ====
On Rotten Tomatoes, the fifth season earned positive reviews from 80% of 31 critics. The site's critical consensus reads: "The Handmaid's Tale has lost its urgency after spreading its once-arresting premise thin in a season focused on vengeance's consequences, but the women of Gilead are still played with compelling exactitude." On Metacritic, it received an average score of 63 out of 100, based on 7 reviews, indicating "generally favorable reviews".

Critics were given the first eight episodes of the season to review. Writing for IGN, Tara Bennett gave it a "good" score of 7 out of 10 and wrote in her verdict: "The Handmaid's Tale remains the canary in the coalmine of TV shows [...]. Elisabeth Moss continues to give a livewire performance as former handmaid/now Canadian refugee June Osborne. [...] But overall, the series continues to suffer with very measured storylines that can't seem to recapture the kinetic energy of the first two seasons." Abby Cavenaugh of Collider graded it with a "B-" and said, "Season 5 is full of scarce highs and really low lows, lots of heavy-hitting drama, and emotional scenes. Some of the biggest events of this season lead to some pretty uncomfortable viewing, but viewers who stick with it will be rewarded with some huge moments that will have repercussions for the final season."

==== Season 6 ====
On Rotten Tomatoes, the sixth and final season earned positive reviews from 87% of 81 critics. The site's critical consensus reads: "Setting its characters on a crash course with their own personal reckonings amid a desperate push against fascism, The Handmaid's Tale concludes on a high note." On Metacritic, the season has a weighted average score of 62 out of 100 based on 11 critics, indicating "generally favorable reviews".

Writing for TheWrap, Lauren Thoman stated: "The Handmaid's Tale Season 6 delivers on the promises it's been making since the beginning, for better and for worse. Buckle up for a furious and frenzied ride. Nolite te bastardes carborundorum." Daniel Fienberg of The Hollywood Reporter wrote: "The Handmaid's Tale is still more than capable of nightmarish images and emotionally potent sequences. Moss has become perhaps the series' finest director (albeit one in need of an editor willing to trim five to 10 minutes per episode) in addition to anchoring a still powerful cast."

=== Political response ===
There was much debate on whether parallels could be drawn between the series (and by extension, the book on which it is based) and American society during the first presidency of Donald Trump. Comparisons were also made to the practices implemented by the Islamic State, such as throwing homosexuals from rooftops, as well as the policies of the Christian reconstructionist movement of the 1970s and 1980s that sought to expel women from the workforce.

Several protests around the world, especially related to women's rights, have made use of the red handmaid uniforms from the TV series.

In 2018, online retailer Yandy.com sparked controversy by marketing a sexualized version of the handmaid costume for Halloween. The retailer subsequently pulled the costume in response to widespread criticism.

=== Awards ===
In 2017, The Handmaid's Tale made history as the first streaming series to win the Primetime Emmy Award for Outstanding Drama Series. However, in 2021, despite receiving 21 nominations, it did not secure any wins, setting a record for Emmy losses.

Accolades received by The Handmaid's Tale
Award	Year	Category	Nominee(s)	Result	Ref.
American Cinema Editors Awards	2018	Best Edited Drama Series for Non-Commercial Television	Julian Clarke and Wendy Hallam Martin (for "Offred")	Won	
American Film Institute Awards	2017	Top 10 TV Programs of the Year	The Handmaid's Tale	Won (Note: This award does not have a single winner, but recognizes multiple series.)	
American Society of Cinematographers Awards	2019	Outstanding Achievement in Cinematography in Regular Series for Non-Commercial Television	Colin Watkinson (for "The Word")	Nominated	
American Society of Cinematographers Awards	2019	Outstanding Achievement in Cinematography in Regular Series for Non-Commercial Television	Zoe White (for "Holly")	Nominated	
American Society of Cinematographers Awards	2020	Outstanding Achievement in Cinematography in Regular Series for Non-Commercial Television	Colin Watkinson (for "Night")	Won	
American Society of Cinematographers Awards	2022	Outstanding Achievement in Cinematography in Regular Series for Non-Commercial Television	Stuart Biddlecombe (for "The Wilderness")	Nominated	
Art Directors Guild Awards	2018	One-Hour Contemporary Single-Camera Series	Julie Berghoff (for "Offred", "Birth Day", "Nolite Te Bastardes Carborundorum")	Won	
Art Directors Guild Awards	2018	One-Hour Contemporary Single-Camera Series	Andrew Stearn (for "The Bridge")	Nominated	
Art Directors Guild Awards	2019	One-Hour Contemporary Single-Camera Series	Mark White and Elisabeth Williams (for "June" and "Unwomen")	Won	
Art Directors Guild Awards	2020	One-Hour Contemporary Single-Camera Series	Elisabeth Williams (for "Mayday")	Nominated	
Art Directors Guild Awards	2022	One-Hour Contemporary Single-Camera Series	Elisabeth Williams (for "Chicago")	Nominated	
British Academy Television Awards	2018	Best International Programme	The Handmaid's Tale	Won	
British Academy Television Awards	2019	Best International Programme	The Handmaid's Tale	Nominated	
Casting Society of America	2018	Television Pilot and First Season – Drama	Sharon Bialy, Sherry Thomas, Russell Scott, Robin D. Cook, and Jonathan Oliveira	Won	
Casting Society of America	2019	Television Series – Drama	Sharon Bialy, Sherry Thomas, Russell Scott, Robin D. Cook, and Jonathan Oliveira	Nominated	
Casting Society of America	2020	Television Series – Drama	Sharon Bialy, Sherry Thomas, Russell Scott, Robin D. Cook, Stacia Kimler, and Jonathan Oliveira	Nominated	
Casting Society of America	2021	Television Series – Drama	Sharon Bialy, Sherry Thomas, Russell Scott, Robin D. Cook, Stacia Kimler, and Jonathan Oliveira	Nominated	
Casting Society of America	2022	Television Series – Drama	Sharon Bialy, Sherry Thomas, Russell Scott, Robin D. Cook, Stacia Kimler, and Jonathan Oliveira	Nominated	
Cinema Audio Society Awards	2018	Outstanding Achievement in Sound Mixing for Television Series – One Hour	John J. Thomson, Lou Solakofski, Joe Morrow, and Don White (for "Offred")	Nominated	
Cinema Audio Society Awards	2019	Outstanding Achievement in Sound Mixing for Television Series – One Hour	Sylvain Arseneault, Lou Solakofski, Joe Morrow, Scott Michael Smith, Adam Taylor, Mark DeSimone, and Jack Heeren (for "Holly")	Nominated	
Cinema Audio Society Awards	2020	Outstanding Achievement in Sound Mixing for Television Series – One Hour	Sylvain Arseneault, Lou Solakofski, Joe Morrow, Scott Michael Smith, Adam Taylor, Andrea Rusch, and Kevin Schultz (for "Heroic")	Nominated	
Costume Designers Guild Awards	2018	Excellence in Contemporary Television Series	Ane Crabtree	Won	
Costume Designers Guild Awards	2019	Excellence in Sci-Fi/Fantasy Television	Ane Crabtree	Nominated	
Costume Designers Guild Awards	2020	Excellence in Sci-Fi/Fantasy Television	Natalie Bronfman (for "Household")	Nominated	
Costume Designers Guild Awards	2022	Excellence in Sci-Fi/Fantasy Television	Debra Hanson (for "Nightshade")	Nominated	
Critics' Choice Television Awards	2018	Best Drama Series	The Handmaid's Tale	Won	
Critics' Choice Television Awards	2018	Best Actress in a Drama Series	Elisabeth Moss	Won	
Critics' Choice Television Awards	2018	Best Supporting Actress in a Drama Series	Ann Dowd	Won	
Critics' Choice Television Awards	2019	Best Actress in a Drama Series	Elisabeth Moss	Nominated	
Directors Guild of America Awards	2018	Outstanding Directorial Achievement for a Drama Series	Reed Morano (for "Offred")	Won	
Directors Guild of America Awards	2019	Outstanding Directorial Achievement for a Drama Series	Daina Reid (for "Holly")	Nominated	
GLAAD Media Awards	2019	Outstanding Drama Series	The Handmaid's Tale	Nominated	
Golden Globe Awards	2018	Best Television Series – Drama	The Handmaid's Tale	Won	
Golden Globe Awards	2018	Best Actress – Television Series Drama	Elisabeth Moss	Won	
Golden Globe Awards	2018	Best Supporting Actress – Series, Miniseries or Television Film	Ann Dowd	Nominated	
Golden Globe Awards	2019	Best Actress – Television Series Drama	Elisabeth Moss	Nominated	
Golden Globe Awards	2019	Best Supporting Actress – Series, Miniseries or Television Film	Yvonne Strahovski	Nominated	
Golden Globe Awards	2022	Best Actress – Television Series Drama	Elisabeth Moss	Nominated	
Hollywood Critics Association TV Awards	2021	Best Streaming Series, Drama	The Handmaid's Tale	Nominated	
Hollywood Critics Association TV Awards	2021	Best Actress in a Streaming Series, Drama	Elisabeth Moss	Nominated	
Hollywood Critics Association TV Awards	2021	Best Supporting Actor in a Streaming Series, Drama	Bradley Whitford	Nominated	
Hollywood Critics Association TV Awards	2021	Best Supporting Actress in a Streaming Series, Drama	Alexis Bledel	Nominated	
Hollywood Critics Association TV Awards	2021	Best Supporting Actress in a Streaming Series, Drama	Ann Dowd	Nominated	
Hollywood Critics Association TV Awards	2021	Best Supporting Actress in a Streaming Series, Drama	Yvonne Strahovski	Nominated	
Hollywood Critics Association TV Awards	2021	Best Supporting Actress in a Streaming Series, Drama	Samira Wiley	Nominated	
Location Managers Guild Awards	2018	Outstanding Locations in Contemporary Television	John Musikka and Geoffrey Smither	Nominated	
Make-Up Artists and Hair Stylists Guild Awards	2018	Best Television Series, Mini-Series or New Media Series – Best Contemporary Make-Up	Burton LeBlanc, Talia Reinhold, Erika Caceres	Nominated	
Make-Up Artists and Hair Stylists Guild Awards	2019	Best Television Series, Mini-Series or New Media Series – Best Contemporary Make-Up	Burton LeBlanc, Talia Reingold, Erika Caceres	Nominated	
Make-Up Artists and Hair Stylists Guild Awards	2019	Best Television Series, Mini-Series or New Media Series – Contemporary Hair Styling	Karola Dirnberger and Ewa Cynk	Nominated	
Make-Up Artists and Hair Stylists Guild Awards	2020	Best Television Series, Mini-Series or New Media Series – Best Contemporary Make-Up	Burton LeBlanc, Alastair Muir, and Faye Crasto	Nominated	
Make-Up Artists and Hair Stylists Guild Awards	2020	Best Television Series, Mini-Series or New Media Series – Contemporary Hair Styling	Paul Elliot and Ewa Latak-Cynk	Nominated	
MTV Movie & TV Awards	2019	Best Performance in a Show	Elisabeth Moss	Won	
MTV Movie & TV Awards	2019	Best Villain	Joseph Fiennes	Nominated	
NAACP Image Awards	2018	Outstanding Supporting Actress in a Drama Series	Samira Wiley	Nominated	
Peabody Awards	2018	Entertainment, children's and youth honoree	The Handmaid's Tale	Won	
People's Choice Awards	2018	The Drama Show of 2018	The Handmaid's Tale	Nominated	
Primetime Emmy Awards	2017	Outstanding Drama Series	Bruce Miller, Warren Littlefield, Daniel Wilson, Fran Sears, Ilene Chaiken, Sheila Hockin, Eric Tuchman, Frank Siracusa, John Weber, Kira Snyder, Elisabeth Moss, Joseph Boccia, and Leila Gerstein	Won	
Primetime Emmy Awards	2017	Outstanding Lead Actress in a Drama Series	Elisabeth Moss (for "Night")	Won	
Primetime Emmy Awards	2017	Outstanding Supporting Actress in a Drama Series	Ann Dowd (for "Offred")	Won	
Primetime Emmy Awards	2017	Outstanding Supporting Actress in a Drama Series	Samira Wiley (for "Night")	Nominated	
Primetime Emmy Awards	2017	Outstanding Directing for a Drama Series	Reed Morano (for "Offred")	Won	
Primetime Emmy Awards	2017	Outstanding Directing for a Drama Series	Kate Dennis (for "The Bridge")	Nominated	
Primetime Emmy Awards	2017	Outstanding Writing for a Drama Series	Bruce Miller (for "Offred")	Won	
Primetime Emmy Awards	2018	Outstanding Drama Series	Bruce Miller, Warren Littlefield, Elisabeth Moss, Daniel Wilson, Fran Sears, Mike Barker, Sheila Hockin, Eric Tuchman, Kira Snyder, Yahlin Chang, Frank Siracusa, John Weber, Dorothy Fortenberry, and Joseph Boccia	Nominated	
Primetime Emmy Awards	2018	Outstanding Lead Actress in a Drama Series	Elisabeth Moss (for "The Last Ceremony")	Nominated	
Primetime Emmy Awards	2018	Outstanding Supporting Actor in a Drama Series	Joseph Fiennes (for "First Blood")	Nominated	
Primetime Emmy Awards	2018	Outstanding Supporting Actress in a Drama Series	Alexis Bledel (for "Unwomen")	Nominated	
Primetime Emmy Awards	2018	Outstanding Supporting Actress in a Drama Series	Ann Dowd (for "June")	Nominated	
Primetime Emmy Awards	2018	Outstanding Supporting Actress in a Drama Series	Yvonne Strahovski (for "Women's Work")	Nominated	
Primetime Emmy Awards	2018	Outstanding Directing for a Drama Series	Kari Skogland (for "After")	Nominated	
Primetime Emmy Awards	2018	Outstanding Writing for a Drama Series	Bruce Miller (for "June")	Nominated	
Primetime Emmy Awards	2019	Outstanding Directing for a Drama Series	Daina Reid (for "Holly")	Nominated	
Primetime Emmy Awards	2019	Outstanding Writing for a Drama Series	Bruce Miller and Kira Snyder (for "Holly")	Nominated	
Primetime Emmy Awards	2020	Outstanding Drama Series	Bruce Miller, Warren Littlefield, Elisabeth Moss, Daniel Wilson, Fran Sears, Mike Barker, Eric Tuchman, Sheila Hockin, John Weber, Frank Siracusa, Kira Snyder, Yahlin Chang, Margaret Atwood, Dorothy Fortenberry, Marissa Jo Cerar, Nina Fiore, John Herrera, and Kim Todd	Nominated	
Primetime Emmy Awards	2020	Outstanding Supporting Actor in a Drama Series	Bradley Whitford (for "Sacrifice")	Nominated	
Primetime Emmy Awards	2020	Outstanding Supporting Actress in a Drama Series	Samira Wiley (for "Sacrifice")	Nominated	
Primetime Emmy Awards	2021	Outstanding Drama Series	Bruce Miller, Warren Littlefield, Elisabeth Moss, Daniel Wilson, Fran Sears, Eric Tuchman, Sheila Hockin, John Weber, Frank Siracusa, Kira Snyder, Yahlin Chang, Dorothy Fortenberry, Margaret Atwood, Kim Todd, Matt Hastings, Nina Fiore, and John Herrera	Nominated	
Primetime Emmy Awards	2021	Outstanding Lead Actress in a Drama Series	Elisabeth Moss (for "Home")	Nominated	
Primetime Emmy Awards	2021	Outstanding Supporting Actor in a Drama Series	O-T Fagbenle (for "Home")	Nominated	
Primetime Emmy Awards	2021	Outstanding Supporting Actor in a Drama Series	Max Minghella (for "The Crossing")	Nominated	
Primetime Emmy Awards	2021	Outstanding Supporting Actor in a Drama Series	Bradley Whitford (for "Testimony")	Nominated	
Primetime Emmy Awards	2021	Outstanding Supporting Actress in a Drama Series	Madeline Brewer (for "Testimony")	Nominated	
Primetime Emmy Awards	2021	Outstanding Supporting Actress in a Drama Series	Ann Dowd (for "Progress")	Nominated	
Primetime Emmy Awards	2021	Outstanding Supporting Actress in a Drama Series	Yvonne Strahovski (for "Home")	Nominated	
Primetime Emmy Awards	2021	Outstanding Supporting Actress in a Drama Series	Samira Wiley (for "Vows")	Nominated	
Primetime Emmy Awards	2021	Outstanding Directing for a Drama Series	Liz Garbus (for "The Wilderness")	Nominated	
Primetime Emmy Awards	2021	Outstanding Writing for a Drama Series	Yahlin Chang (for "Home")	Nominated	
Primetime Emmy Awards	2023	Outstanding Lead Actress in a Drama Series	Elisabeth Moss	Nominated	
Primetime Creative Arts Emmy Awards	2017	Outstanding Guest Actress in a Drama Series	Alexis Bledel (for "Late")	Won	
Primetime Creative Arts Emmy Awards	2017	Outstanding Casting for a Drama Series	Russell Scott, Sharon Bialy, Sherry Thomas, and Robin D. Cook	Nominated	
Primetime Creative Arts Emmy Awards	2017	Outstanding Cinematography for a Single-Camera Series (One Hour)	Colin Watkinson (for "Offred")	Won	
Primetime Creative Arts Emmy Awards	2017	Outstanding Period/Fantasy Costumes for a Series, Limited Series, or Movie	Ane Crabtree and Sheena Wichary (for "Offred")	Nominated	
Primetime Creative Arts Emmy Awards	2017	Outstanding Production Design for a Narrative Contemporary or Fantasy Program (One Hour or More)	Julie Berghoff, Evan Webber, and Sophie Neudorfer (for "Offred")	Won	
Primetime Creative Arts Emmy Awards	2017	Outstanding Special Visual Effects in a Supporting Role	Brendan Taylor, Stephen Lebed, Leo Bovell, Martin O'Brien, Winston Lee, Kelly Knauff, Zach Dembinski, Mike Suta, and Cameron Kerr (for "Birth Day")	Nominated	
Primetime Creative Arts Emmy Awards	2018	Outstanding Guest Actress in a Drama Series	Kelly Jenrette (for "Other Women")	Nominated	
Primetime Creative Arts Emmy Awards	2018	Outstanding Guest Actress in a Drama Series	Cherry Jones (for "Baggage")	Nominated	
Primetime Creative Arts Emmy Awards	2018	Outstanding Guest Actress in a Drama Series	Samira Wiley (for "After")	Won	
Primetime Creative Arts Emmy Awards	2018	Outstanding Casting for a Drama Series	Sharon Bialy, Sherry Thomas, Russell Scott, and Robin D. Cook	Nominated	
Primetime Creative Arts Emmy Awards	2018	Outstanding Cinematography for a Single-Camera Series (One Hour)	Colin Watkinson (for "June")	Nominated	
Primetime Creative Arts Emmy Awards	2018	Outstanding Fantasy/Sci-Fi Costumes	Ane Crabtree and Natalie Bronfman (for "Seeds")	Nominated	
Primetime Creative Arts Emmy Awards	2018	Outstanding Makeup for a Single-Camera Series (Non-Prosthetic)	Burton LeBlanc, Talia Reingold, and Erika Caceres (for "Unwomen")	Nominated	
Primetime Creative Arts Emmy Awards	2018	Outstanding Production Design for a Narrative Contemporary Program (One Hour or More)	Mark White, Elisabeth Williams, Martha Sparrow, and Caroline Gee (for "June")	Won	
Primetime Creative Arts Emmy Awards	2018	Outstanding Production Design for a Narrative Contemporary Program (One Hour or More)	Elisabeth Williams, Martha Sparrow, and Rob Hepburn (for "Seeds", "First Blood", "After")	Nominated	
Primetime Creative Arts Emmy Awards	2018	Outstanding Single-Camera Picture Editing for a Drama Series	Wendy Hallam Martin (for "June")	Won	
Primetime Creative Arts Emmy Awards	2018	Outstanding Sound Mixing for a Comedy or Drama Series (One-Hour)	Joe Morrow, Lou Solakofski, and Sylvain Arseneault (for "June")	Nominated	
Primetime Creative Arts Emmy Awards	2018	Outstanding Special Visual Effects in a Supporting Role	Stephen Lebed, Brendan Taylor, Kelly Knauff, Kelly Weisz, Kevin McGeagh, Anderson Leo Bovell, Winston Lee, Xi Luo, and Cameron Kerr (for "June")	Nominated	
Primetime Creative Arts Emmy Awards	2019	Outstanding Guest Actor in a Drama Series	Bradley Whitford (for "Postpartum")	Won	
Primetime Creative Arts Emmy Awards	2019	Outstanding Guest Actress in a Drama Series	Cherry Jones (for "Holly")	Won	
Primetime Creative Arts Emmy Awards	2019	Outstanding Cinematography for a Single-Camera Series (One Hour)	Colin Watkinson for ("The Word")	Nominated	
Primetime Creative Arts Emmy Awards	2019	Outstanding Cinematography for a Single-Camera Series (One Hour)	Zoë White (for "Holly")	Nominated	
Primetime Creative Arts Emmy Awards	2019	Outstanding Fantasy/Sci-Fi Costumes	Ane Crabtree and Natalie Bronfman (for "The Word")	Nominated	
Primetime Creative Arts Emmy Awards	2019	Outstanding Music Composition for a Series (Original Dramatic Score)	Adam Taylor (for "The Word")	Nominated	
Primetime Creative Arts Emmy Awards	2019	Outstanding Single-Camera Picture Editing for a Drama Series	Wendy Hallam Martin (for "The Word")	Nominated	
Primetime Creative Arts Emmy Awards	2019	Outstanding Production Design for a Narrative Contemporary Program (One Hour or More)	Elisabeth Williams, Martha Sparrow, and Robert Hepburn (for "Holly")	Won	
Primetime Creative Arts Emmy Awards	2019	Outstanding Sound Mixing for a Comedy or Drama Series (One Hour)	Joe Morrow, Lou Solakofski, and Sylvain Arseneault (for "Holly")	Nominated	
Primetime Creative Arts Emmy Awards	2020	Outstanding Guest Actress in a Drama Series	Alexis Bledel (for "God Bless the Child")	Nominated	
Primetime Creative Arts Emmy Awards	2020	Outstanding Casting for a Drama Series	Sharon Bialy, Sherry Thomas, Russell Scott, and Robin D. Cook	Nominated	
Primetime Creative Arts Emmy Awards	2020	Outstanding Fantasy/Sci-Fi Costumes	Natalie Bronfman, Helena Davis Perry, and Christina Cattle (for "Household")	Nominated	
Primetime Creative Arts Emmy Awards	2020	Outstanding Contemporary Hairstyling	Paul Elliot and Ewa Latak-Cynk (for "Liars")	Nominated	
Primetime Creative Arts Emmy Awards	2020	Outstanding Contemporary Makeup (Non-Prosthetic)	Burton LeBlanc and Alastair Muir (for "Mayday")	Nominated	
Primetime Creative Arts Emmy Awards	2020	Outstanding Production Design for a Narrative Contemporary Program (One Hour or More)	Elisabeth Williams, Martha Sparrow, and Robert Hepburn (for "Household")	Won	
Primetime Creative Arts Emmy Awards	2020	Outstanding Special Visual Effects in a Supporting Role	Stephen Lebed, Brendan Taylor, Leo Bovell, Rob Greb, Gwen Zhang, Marlis Coto, Stephen Wagner, Josh Clark, and James Minett (for "Household")	Nominated	
Primetime Creative Arts Emmy Awards	2021	Outstanding Guest Actress in a Drama Series	Alexis Bledel (for "Testimony")	Nominated	
Primetime Creative Arts Emmy Awards	2021	Outstanding Guest Actress in a Drama Series	Mckenna Grace (for "Pigs")	Nominated	
Primetime Creative Arts Emmy Awards	2021	Outstanding Casting for a Drama Series	Sharon Bialy, Sherry Thomas, Russell Scott, and Robin D. Cook	Nominated	
Primetime Creative Arts Emmy Awards	2021	Outstanding Production Design for a Narrative Contemporary Program (One Hour or More)	Elisabeth Williams, Martha Sparrow, Larry Spittle, and Rob Hepburn (for "Chicago")	Nominated	
Primetime Creative Arts Emmy Awards	2021	Outstanding Fantasy/Sci-Fi Costumes	Debra Hanson, Jane Flanders, and Darci Cheyne (for "Nightshade")	Nominated	
Primetime Creative Arts Emmy Awards	2021	Outstanding Contemporary Hairstyling	Paul Elliot and Franchi Pir (for "Vows")	Nominated	
Primetime Creative Arts Emmy Awards	2021	Outstanding Contemporary Makeup (Non-Prosthetic)	Burton LeBlanc and Alastair Muir (for "Pigs")	Nominated	
Primetime Creative Arts Emmy Awards	2021	Outstanding Music Composition for a Series (Original Dramatic Score)	Adam Taylor (for "The Crossing")	Nominated	
Primetime Creative Arts Emmy Awards	2021	Outstanding Single-Camera Picture Editing for a Drama Series	Wendy Hallam Martin (for "The Crossing")	Nominated	
Primetime Creative Arts Emmy Awards	2021	Outstanding Sound Mixing for a Comedy or Drama Series (One-Hour)	Lou Solakofski, Joe Morrow, and Sylvain Arseneault (for "Chicago")	Nominated	
Primetime Creative Arts Emmy Awards	2025	Outstanding Guest Actress in a Drama Series	Cherry Jones (for "Exile")	Nominated	
Producers Guild of America Awards	2018	Outstanding Producer of Episodic Television, Drama	The Handmaid's Tale	Won	
Producers Guild of America Awards	2019	Outstanding Producer of Episodic Television, Drama	The Handmaid's Tale	Nominated	
Producers Guild of America Awards	2022	Outstanding Producer of Episodic Television, Drama	The Handmaid's Tale	Nominated	
Satellite Awards	2018	Best Drama Series	The Handmaid's Tale	Nominated	
Satellite Awards	2018	Best Actress in a Drama / Genre Series	Elisabeth Moss	Won	
Satellite Awards	2018	Best Supporting Actress in a Series, Miniseries or TV Film	Ann Dowd	Won	
Satellite Awards	2019	Best Drama Series	The Handmaid's Tale	Nominated	
Satellite Awards	2019	Best Actress in a Drama / Genre Series	Elisabeth Moss	Nominated	
Satellite Awards	2022	Best Actress in a Drama / Genre Series	Elisabeth Moss	Nominated	
Satellite Awards	2023	Best Actress in a Drama / Genre Series	Elisabeth Moss	Won	
Saturn Awards	2018	Best New Media Television Series	The Handmaid's Tale	Nominated	
Saturn Awards	2019	Best Streaming Horror & Thriller Series	The Handmaid's Tale	Nominated	
Screen Actors Guild Awards	2018	Outstanding Performance by an Ensemble in a Drama Series	Madeline Brewer, Amanda Brugel, Ann Dowd, O-T Fagbenle, Joseph Fiennes, Tattiawna Jones, Max Minghella, Elisabeth Moss, Yvonne Strahovski, and Samira Wiley	Nominated	
Screen Actors Guild Awards	2018	Outstanding Performance by a Female Actor in a Drama Series	Elisabeth Moss	Nominated	
Screen Actors Guild Awards	2019	Outstanding Performance by an Ensemble in a Drama Series	Alexis Bledel, Madeline Brewer, Amanda Brugel, Ann Dowd, O-T Fagbenle, Joseph Fiennes, Nina Kiri, Max Minghella, Elisabeth Moss, Yvonne Strahovski, Sydney Sweeney, and Bahia Watson	Nominated	
Screen Actors Guild Awards	2019	Outstanding Performance by a Male Actor in a Drama Series	Joseph Fiennes	Nominated	
Screen Actors Guild Awards	2019	Outstanding Performance by a Female Actor in a Drama Series	Elisabeth Moss	Nominated	
Screen Actors Guild Awards	2020	Outstanding Performance by an Ensemble in a Drama Series	Alexis Bledel, Madeline Brewer, Amanda Brugel, Ann Dowd, O-T Fagbenle, Joseph Fiennes, Kristen Gutoskie, Nina Kiri, Ashleigh LaThrop, Elisabeth Moss, Yvonne Strahovski, Bahia Watson, Bradley Whitford, and Samira Wiley	Nominated	
Screen Actors Guild Awards	2020	Outstanding Performance by a Female Actor in a Drama Series	Elisabeth Moss	Nominated	
Screen Actors Guild Awards	2022	Outstanding Performance by an Ensemble in a Drama Series	Alexis Bledel, Madeline Brewer, Amanda Brugel, Ann Dowd, O-T Fagbenle, Joseph Fiennes, Sam Jaeger, Max Minghella, Elisabeth Moss, Yvonne Strahovski, Bradley Whitford, and Samira Wiley	Nominated	
Screen Actors Guild Awards	2022	Outstanding Performance by a Female Actor in a Drama Series	Elisabeth Moss	Nominated	
Set Decorators Society of America Awards	2022	Best Achievement in Décor/Design of a One Hour Fantasy or Science Fiction Series	Rob Hepburn and Elisabeth Williams	Nominated	
Television Critics Association Awards	2017	Program of the Year	The Handmaid's Tale	Won	
Television Critics Association Awards	2017	Outstanding Achievement in Drama	The Handmaid's Tale	Won	
Television Critics Association Awards	2017	Outstanding New Program	The Handmaid's Tale	Nominated	
Television Critics Association Awards	2017	Individual Achievement in Drama	Elisabeth Moss	Nominated	
Television Critics Association Awards	2018	Program of the Year	The Handmaid's Tale	Nominated	
Television Critics Association Awards	2018	Outstanding Achievement in Drama	The Handmaid's Tale	Nominated	
Television Critics Association Awards	2018	Individual Achievement in Drama	Elisabeth Moss	Nominated	
Television Critics Association Awards	2021	Outstanding Achievement in Drama	The Handmaid's Tale	Nominated	
USC Scripter Awards	2018	Best Adapted TV Screenplay	Bruce Miller and Margaret Atwood (for "Offred")	Won	
Visual Effects Society Awards	2019	Outstanding Supporting Visual Effects in a Photoreal Episode	Brendan Taylor, Stephen Lebed, Winston Lee, and Leo Bovell (for "June")	Nominated	
Visual Effects Society Awards	2019	Outstanding Created Environment in an Episode, Commercial, or Real-Time Project	Patrick Zentis, Kevin McGeagh, Leo Bovell, and Zachary Dembinski (for "June") – Fenway Park	Nominated	
Visual Effects Society Awards	2019	Outstanding Compositing in a Photoreal Episode	Winston Lee, Gwen Zhang, Xi Luo, and Kevin Quatman (for "June")	Nominated	
Visual Effects Society Awards	2022	Outstanding Supporting Visual Effects in a Photoreal Episode	Brendan Taylor, Stephen Lebed, Kayla Cabral, and Brannek Gaudet (for "Chicago")	Nominated	
Writers Guild of America Awards	2018	Dramatic Series	Ilene Chaiken, Nina Fiore, Dorothy Fortenberry, Leila Gerstein, John Herrera, Lynn Maxcy, Bruce Miller, Kira Snyder, Wendy Straker Hauser, and Eric Tuchman	Won	
Writers Guild of America Awards	2018	New Series	Ilene Chaiken, Nina Fiore, Dorothy Fortenberry, Leila Gerstein, John Herrera, Lynn Maxcy, Bruce Miller, Kira Snyder, Wendy Straker Hauser, and Eric Tuchman	Won	
Writers Guild of America Awards	2019	Dramatic Series	Yahlin Chang, Nina Fiore, Dorothy Fortenberry, John Herrera, Lynn Renee Maxcy, Bruce Miller, Kira Snyder, and Eric Tuchman	Nominated	
Writers Guild of America Awards	2019	Episodic Drama	Eric Tuchman (for "First Blood")	Nominated	
Writers Guild of America Awards	2020	Dramatic Series	Marissa Jo Cerar, Yahlin Chang, Nina Fiore, Dorothy Fortenberry, Jacy Heldrich, John Herrera, Lynn Renee Maxcy, Bruce Miller, Kira Snyder, and Eric Tuchman	Nominated	
Writers Guild of America Awards	2022	Dramatic Series	Yahlin Chang, Nina Fiore, Dorothy Fortenberry, Jacey Heldrich, John Herrera, Bruce Miller, Aly Monroe, Kira Snyder, and Eric Tuchman	Nominated	
Writers Guild of America Awards	2022	Episodic Drama	Kira Snyder for "Testimony"	Nominated	
Women Film Critics Circle	2021	Outstanding Series	The Handmaid's Tale	Won	

== See also ==
- List of original programs distributed by Hulu
- Religious censorship – Form of censorship involving religious authority
- Sex and sexuality in speculative fiction
