= Eric Tuchman =

American producer and screenwriter

- Education: Brandeis University (BA); Columbia University (MFA)
- Occupation(s): television producer, screenwriter
- Years active: 1997 – present

Eric Tuchman is an American producer and screenwriter. He is known for writing the Animation Adaptation for the 20th Century Fox animated movie Anastasia as well as his work on the television series The Handmaid's Tale as a writer and Executive Producer. He was also the showrunner of the TV series Kyle XY .

== Biography ==
Tuchman grew up in Seaford, New York. He received his B.A. from Brandeis University and MFA from Columbia University. In 2018, he signed an overall deal with MGM television to create and develop new projects for the studio and Hulu.

== Awards and nominations ==
Tuchman shared a 2017 Primetime Emmy Award for Outstanding Drama Series for his work on The Handmaid's Tale and received three Emmy nominations. He also received a Producers Guild of America Award for Best Episodic Drama in 2018 and won two Writers Guild of America Awards as part of the writing team of The Handmaid's Tale. In 1998, he was nominated for an Annie Award for Outstanding Achievement for Writing in a Feature Production for his screenplay of Anastasia.
