= Nina Fiore =

American television writer and producer

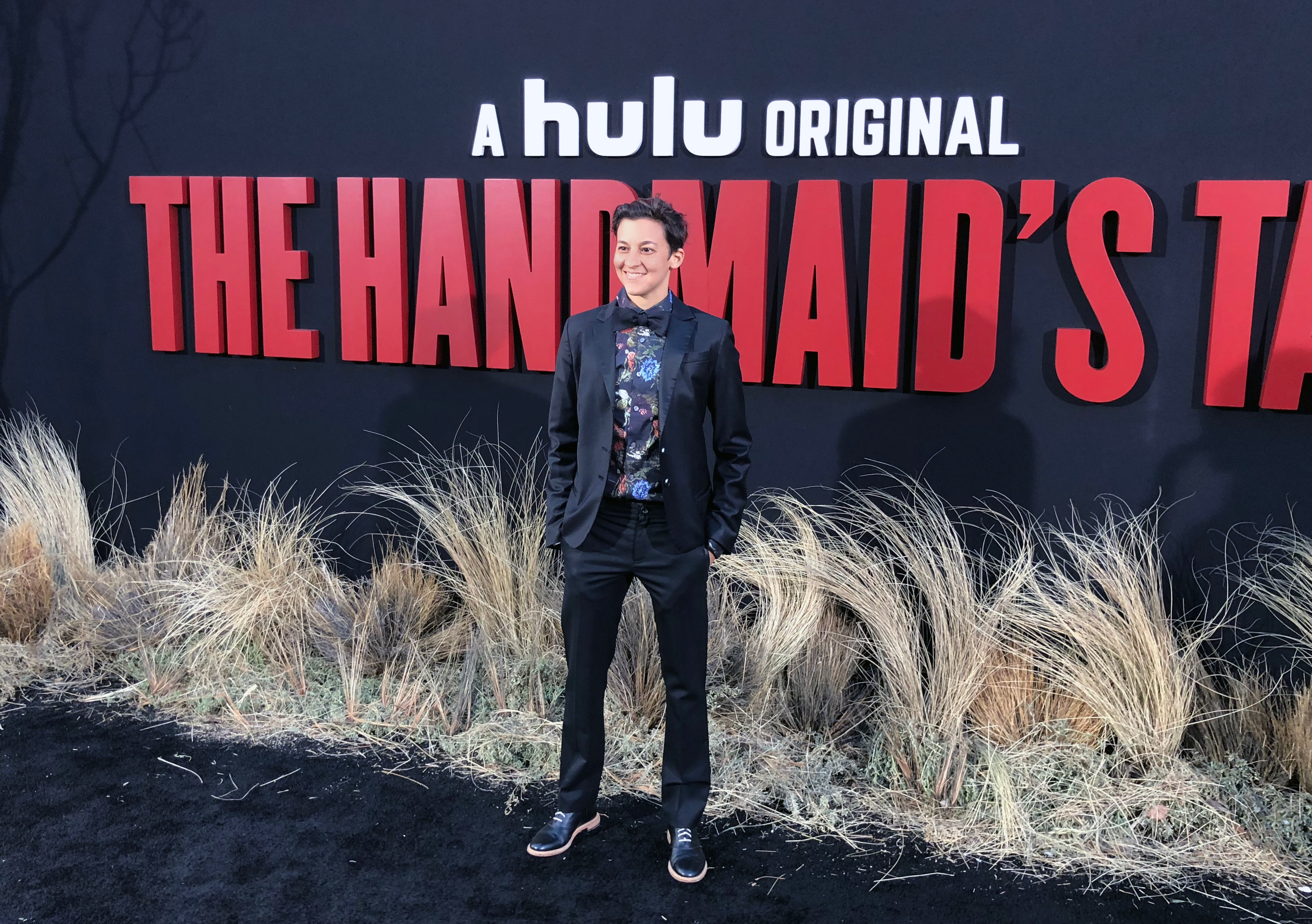
- Fiore at the Season 2 premiere of The Handmaid's Tale
- Born: New York City
- Education: Fordham University
- Occupations: Director; producer; writer
- Years active: 2004–present

Nina Fiore is an American TV and film writer and producer. She has written for Eureka (2006), Alphas (2014), The Vampire Diaries, Nancy Drew and the Hidden Staircase, and The Handmaid's Tale (2017). For her work on The Handmaid's Tale, Fiore, along with the entire writing staff, won the 2018 Writers Guild of America Award for Television: New Series and the 2018 Writers Guild of America Award for Television: Dramatic Series, and she later received a nomination for the 2019 Primetime Emmy Award for Outstanding Drama Series.

== Career ==
Fiore was a writer for The Handmaid's Tale (2017–2019). She wrote for the show when it won for the Primetime Emmy Award for Outstanding Drama Series and Outstanding Writing for a Drama Series, as well as the Golden Globe Award for Best Television Series – Drama.

Fiore is developing a new series for Freeform titled Dante's Inferno.

== Filmography ==
=== Television ===
Title	Year	Functioned as				Notes
Title	Year	Director	Writer	Producer	Other	Notes
Sleeper Cell	2005–2006				script coordinator	17 episodes, assistant to writers on 9 episodes
Eureka	2012		Yes			
Alphas	2012		Yes			
The Vampire Diaries	2014–2015		Yes		story editor	10 episodes, story editor 9 episodes, writer of 1 episode
Blood Drive	2017		Yes		story editor	8 episodes, writer of 2 episodes
The Handmaid's Tale	2017–2025		Yes	Yes	executive story editor	15 episodes written, executive story editor on early seasons, later supervising producer/co-executive producer/producer, 34 episodes as producer (2019–2025)
Nightflyers	2018			consulting producer		consulting producer (as Nina Fiora), 6 episodes
The Purge	2019		Yes	consulting producer		10 episodes, consulting producer, writer of 2 episodes
Dante's Inferno	Announced 2020		Yes	Executive		in development

=== Film ===
Title	Year	Functioned as				Notes
Title	Year	Director	Writer	Producer	Other	Notes
Kinsey	2004				Yes	Production assistant
Nancy Drew and the Hidden Staircase	2019		Yes			
