= Bruce Miller (producer) =

American television writer and producer

Bruce Miller is an American television writer and producer. He is best known for Eureka (2006), The 100 (2014), and The Handmaid's Tale (2017). For his work on The Handmaid's Tale, Miller won the 2017 Primetime Emmy Award for Outstanding Drama Series and Outstanding Writing for a Drama Series, as well as the Golden Globe Award for Best Television Series – Drama. It was the first show on a streaming platform to win an Emmy for Outstanding Series. More recently, Miller signed an overall development deal with ABC Signature and Hulu.

== Personal life and education ==
Miller grew up in Stamford, Connecticut, and graduated from Brown University in 1987. He identifies as Jewish.

== Television ==
Title	Year	Function			Notes
Title	Year	Writer	Executive producer	Creator	Notes
Higher Ground	2000	2 episodes	No	No	
ER	2002–2004	4 episodes	Supervising	No	43 episodes
Everwood	2004-2005	2 episodes	Co-executive	No	14 episodes
Medium	2005–2006	3 episodes	Co-executive	No	12 episodes
The 4400	2006	2 episodes	Co-executive	No	13 episodes
Men in Trees	2007	1 episode	Co-executive	No	5 episodes
In Plain Sight	2008	1 episode	Consulting	No	5 episodes
Eureka	2007-2012	12 episodes	Yes	No	61 episodes
Alphas	2012	1 episode	Yes	No	13 episodes
The 100	2014–2015	4 episodes	Co-executive	No	28 episodes
The Devil You Know	2015	1 episode	Yes	No	Episode: "Pilot"
The Handmaid's Tale	2017-2025	17 episodes	Yes	Yes	66 episodes
The Testaments	2026	Yes	Yes	Yes	

== Film ==
Title	Year	Function			Notes
Title	Year	Writer	Producer	Other	Notes
Providence (1991)	1991	Yes			
The Stranger Beside Me	1995	Yes			
No One Could Protect Her	1996	Yes			
The Assassination File	1996	Yes			
Sweet Dreams	1996	Yes			
Higher Ground	2000	Yes			
She's Too Young	2004		Co-producer		
