= Colin Watkinson =

British cinematographer

Colin Watkinson is an English cinematographer. He won the Primetime Emmy Award for Outstanding Cinematography for a Single-Camera Series (One Hour) for Offred, the pilot episode of The Handmaid's Tale, and was nominated in the same category for subsequent series. He was director of photography for Tarsem Singh's The Fall in 2006.

== Filmography ==
Short film

| Year | Title | Director |
|---|---|---|
| 2003 | Confused | Camille Griffin |
| 2011 | J. Arthur | Justin Leibow |
| 2012 | Exquisite | Justin Leibow |
| 2018 | Hell Hath Enlarged Herself | Gerald McMorrow |
| 2019 | A Story Takes Flight | Reed Morano |
| 2020 | Tunnel Beach | Nina Kiri |
| 2024 | Embers | Gerald McMorrow |
| 2025 | Vlog | Yvonne Strahovski |

Feature film

| Year | Title | Director | Notes |
|---|---|---|---|
| 2006 | The Fall | Tarsem Singh | |
| 2018 | Across The Rails | Damian Fitzsimmons | Also credited as associate producer |
| 2022 | Luckiest Girl Alive | Mike Barker | |

Television

| Year | Title | Director | Notes |
|---|---|---|---|
| 2008 | Entourage | Mark Mylod | 6 episodes |
| 2011 | Wonder Woman | Jeffrey Reiner | Unaired pilot |
| 2013 | Monday Mornings | Bill D'Elia | Episode "Pilot" |
| 2017 | Emerald City | Tarsem Singh | All 10 episodes |
| 2017-2019 | The Handmaid's Tale | Reed Morano; Mike Barker; Floria Sigismondi; Kate Dennis; Kari Skogland; Jeremy Podeswa | 19 episodes; Also directed 3 episodes |
| 2019 | Truth Be Told | Mikkel Nørgaard | Episode "Monster" |
| 2023 | The Power | Logan Kibens; Ugla Hauksdóttir; Lisa Gunning | Episodes "A Better Future is in Your Hands" and "The World is on Fu*king Fire" |
| 2025 | Alien: Earth | Noah Hawley | Episode "In Space, No One..." |

Miniseries

| Year | Title | Director | Notes |
|---|---|---|---|
| 2025 | The Twisted Tale of Amanda Knox | Michael Uppendahl | 6 episodes |
| 2027 | Wild Things | Matt Shakman; John Hoffman | |

== Awards and nominations ==
| Year | Award | Category | Title | Episode | Result | Ref. |
|---|---|---|---|---|---|---|
| 2017-2019 | Primetime Emmy Awards | Outstanding Cinematography for a Single-Camera Series (One Hour) | The Handmaid's Tale | "Offred" | Won | |
| 2017-2019 | Primetime Emmy Awards | Outstanding Cinematography for a Single-Camera Series (One Hour) | The Handmaid's Tale | "June" | Nominated | |
| 2017-2019 | Primetime Emmy Awards | Outstanding Cinematography for a Single-Camera Series (One Hour) | The Handmaid's Tale | "The Word" | Nominated | |
