= Juno Temple =

English actress (born 1989)

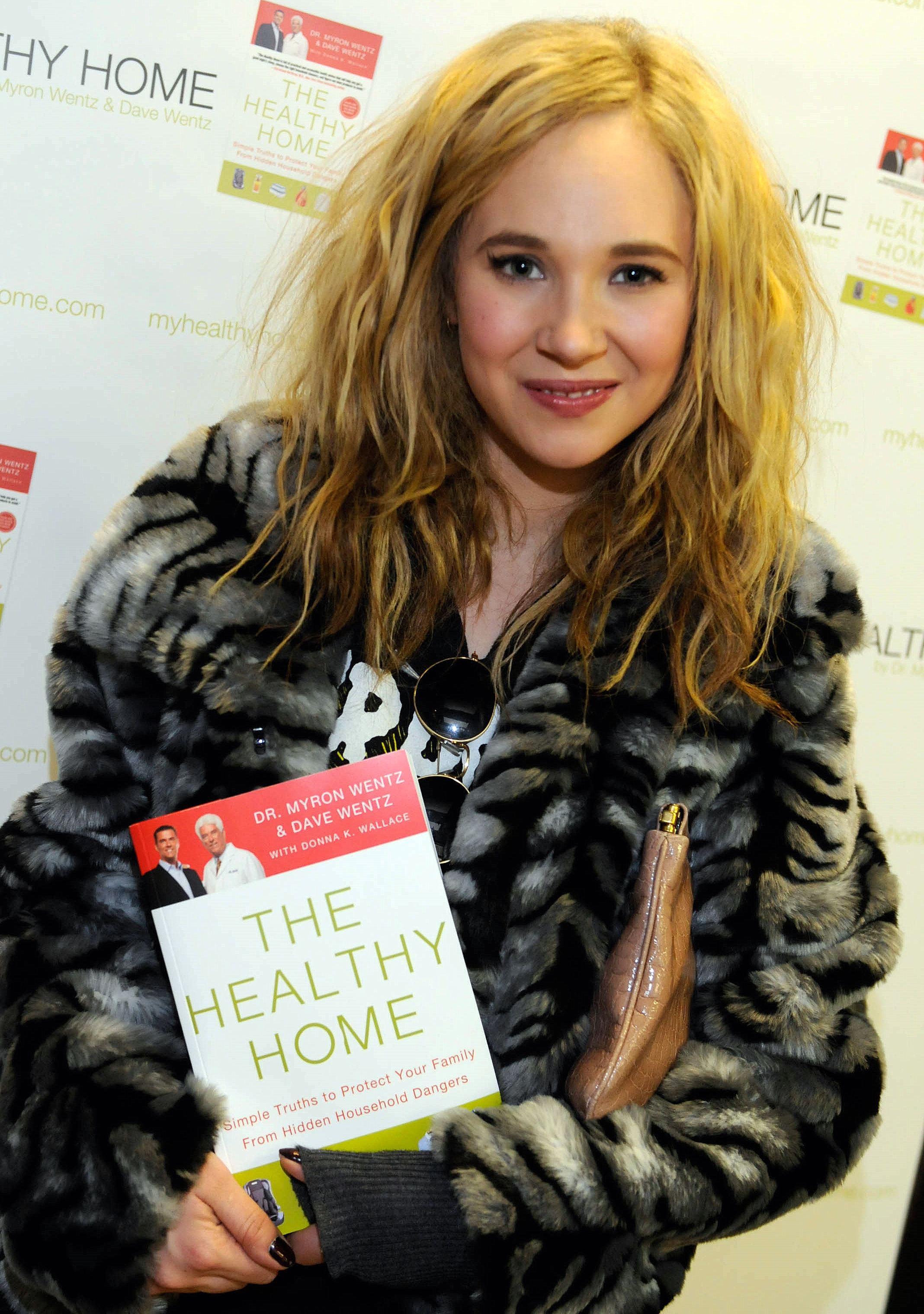
- Juno Temple in 2011
- Born: 21 July 1989 (age 37); London, England
- Occupation: Actress
- Years active: 1997–present
- Spouse: Michał Szymański
- Father: Julien Temple
- Relatives: Nina Temple (aunt)

Juno Temple (born 21 July 1989) is a British actor. She is known for her roles in the comedy series Ted Lasso (2020–present), the voice of Ivy in the animated Skydance/Netflix film Swapped (2026), and in the fifth season of the crime drama series Fargo (2023–2024). She earned Primetime Emmy Award nominations for both, as well as a Golden Globe Award nomination for the latter. She also portrayed Teddy Paine in the superhero film Venom: The Last Dance (2024).

Temple, the daughter of film director Julien Temple, began working as a child actress, appearing in Notes on a Scandal (2006), Atonement (2007), The Other Boleyn Girl (2008), and Mr. Nobody (2009). Her subsequent film roles were in The Three Musketeers (2011), The Dark Knight Rises (2012), Magic Magic (2013), Afternoon Delight (2013), Maleficent (2014), Black Mass (2015), Unsane (2018), and Maleficent: Mistress of Evil (2019). Temple received the BAFTA Rising Star Award in 2013. She has also starred in the television series Vinyl (2016), Dirty John (2018–2019), and The Offer (2022).

== Early life ==
Juno Violet Temple was born on 21 July 1989, in London, England. She is daughter of film producer Amanda Pirie and film director Julien Temple, and she has two younger brothers, Leo and Felix. Her aunt, Nina Temple, was the last general secretary of the Communist Party of Great Britain. She grew up in Somerset, where she attended Enmore Primary School. She then attended King’s College, Taunton, as well as the Bedales School in Hampshire where she completed her A-levels. She then became increasingly interested in acting, often finding small roles in her father’s films, or small parts in open casting auditions. Eventually, in 2009, she moved to Los Angeles, California, to officially pursue acting.

== Career ==
Temple began her career as a child actress in the 1997 film Vigo: Passion for Life, a film about Jean Vigo. Her father directed her in the role of Emma Southey in the 2000 film Pandaemonium.

Early in her career, she attracted praise playing supporting roles. One reviewer said that she played her part in Notes on a Scandal (2006) with "petulance and angst", while her performance as Lola Quincey in Atonement (2007) was called "impressive". She auditioned to play Luna Lovegood in Harry Potter and the Order of the Phoenix (2007), though the role ultimately went to Evanna Lynch. In 2009, Temple played Eema in the comedy Year One alongside Jack Black and Michael Cera, Anna in Jaco Van Dormael's Mr. Nobody, and Di Radfield in the film adaptation of Sheila Kohler's novel, Cracks. Some of her other film credits at the time include Celia in St Trinian's (2007) and St Trinian's 2: The Legend of Fritton's Gold (2009), Jennifer "Drippy" Logan in Wild Child (2008), and Jane Parker in The Other Boleyn Girl (2008).

In 2010, she starred in Abe Sylvia's Dirty Girl, which premiered at the Toronto International Film Festival; and appeared in a sketch for FunnyOrDie called "Cycop", which featured the protagonist from the indie film The Mother of Invention (2009) in a poorly made film of his creation. She also had a major role in the film Kaboom (2010), which won the first Queer Palm award. In 2011, Temple appeared in Paul W. S. Anderson's 3D film adaptation of The Three Musketeers, as Anne of Austria, the Queen Consort of France. That same year, she played Dottie in Killer Joe, a role Temple received after sending an unsolicited audition tape to the movie's casting director. She also starred in Elgin James's 2011 film Little Birds. James offered her the choice of playing either of the two female leads and she chose to portray Lily, citing that she connected with the character more and "wanted to set her free". Temple and James worked on Little Birds together for two years, and continued to collaborate afterwards, referring to each other as "best friends" and "family" in interviews. James has said he made Little Birds to honor the strong women in his life, including Temple. That same year, she was named a Brit to Watch by the British Academy of Film and Television Arts.

In 2012, she appeared in The Dark Knight Rises, as a "street-smart Gotham girl", and portrayed Diane in the lesbian werewolf tale Jack & Diane. In February 2013, Temple won the EE Rising Star BAFTA Award, voted for by the public.

Temple had a supporting role as Deborah Hussey in the true-crime film Black Mass (2015), which starred Johnny Depp; and played Jamie Vine, an A&R assistant for the fictional American Century record company, in the 2016 HBO series Vinyl.

Temple has also appeared in the music videos for Kid Harpoon's "Milkmaid" and Plushgun's "Just Impolite".

In 2018–2019, Temple played the protagonist's daughter in the Bravo series Dirty John, later acquired by Netflix. In 2020, she won the Best Actress award at the Prague Independent Film Festival for her role in the film Lost Transmissions.

In August 2020, Temple began a regular role as Keeley Jones, a former girlfriend of one of the team players and the unofficial team publicist, on the critically lauded and popularly successful Apple TV+ series Ted Lasso.

In 2022, Temple appeared in the Paramount+ miniseries The Offer, depicting the production of The Godfather.

In 2023, Temple appeared in the starring role of the fifth season of the American crime anthology series Fargo. Her performance earned wide praise.

Temple is set to play the lead in The Husbands, an Apple TV+ TV series based on the novel The Husbands by Holly Gramazio, expected to start production in late 2025.

In 2026 she played the voice of Ivy, a fictional bird called a Javin, in the Skydance / Netflix animated film Swapped, which ranked Netflix’s 8th most-watched movie of all time.

== Personal life ==
From 2013 to 2016, Temple was in a relationship with American actor Michael Angarano, with whom she lived in the Los Feliz neighbourhood of Los Angeles. In February 2024, it was reported that Temple had been dating Polish actor and production crew member, Michal Szymanski, since 2022. In August 2026, she confirmed her marriage with Szymanski.

== Filmography ==
=== Film ===
Year	Title	Role	Notes
2000	Pandaemonium	Emma Southey	
2006	Notes on a Scandal	Polly Hart	
2007	Atonement	Lola Quincey	
2007	St Trinian's	Celia	
2008	The Other Boleyn Girl	Jane Boleyn, Viscountess Rochford	
2008	Wild Child	Jennifer "Drippy" Logan	
2009	Year One	Eema	
2009	Cracks	Di Radfield	
2009	Mr. Nobody	Anna (age 15)	
2009	Glorious 39	Celia	
2009	St Trinian's 2: The Legend of Fritton's Gold	Celia	
2010	Greenberg	Muriel	
2010	Swerve	Missy	Short film
2010	Bastard	Girl	Short film
2010	Kaboom	London	
2010	Dirty Girl	Danielle Edmondston	
2011	Henry	Babysitter	Short film
2011	Little Birds	Lily Hobart	
2011	The Three Musketeers	Queen Anne	
2012	The Dark Knight Rises	Jen	
2012	The Brass Teapot	Alice	
2012	Killer Joe	Dottie Smith	
2012	Small Apartments	Simone	
2012	Jack & Diane	Diane / Karen	
2013	Afternoon Delight	McKenna	
2013	Magic Magic	Alicia	
2013	Lovelace	Patsy	
2013	Horns	Merrin Williams	
2014	Maleficent	Thistlewit	
2014	Sin City: A Dame to Kill For	Sally	
2015	Safelight	Vicki	
2015	Meadowland	Mackenzie	
2015	Far from the Madding Crowd	Fanny Robin	
2015	Len and Company	Zoe	
2015	Black Mass	Deborah Hussey	
2016	Away	Ria	
2017	The Most Hated Woman in America	Robin Murray O'Hair	
2017	One Percent More Humid	Iris	
2017	Wonder Wheel	Carolina	
2018	Unsane	Violet	
2018	Pretenders	Victoria	
2018	Tocsin	Coral	Short film
2019	Lost Transmissions	Hannah	
2019	Maleficent: Mistress of Evil	Thistlewit	
2021	Palmer	Shelly	
2024	Venom: The Last Dance	Dr. Teddy Paine / Agony	
2025	Roofman	Michelle	
2025	Good Luck, Have Fun, Don't Die	Susan	
2026	Swapped	Ivy	Voice role

=== Television ===
Year	Title	Role	Notes
2014–2016	Drunk History	Sybil Ludington / Marilyn Monroe	Episodes: "New York City", "Legends"
2016	Vinyl	Jamie Vine	Main role
2017	Philip K. Dick's Electric Dreams	Emily	Episode: "Autofac"
2018–2019	Dirty John	Veronica Newell	Main role
2020	Little Birds	Lucy Savage	Main role
2020–present	Ted Lasso	Keeley Jones	Main role
2021	Mr. Corman	Megan	2 episodes
2021–2022	Wolfboy and the Everything Factory	Nyx	Voice role; 7 episodes
2022	The Offer	Bettye McCartt	Miniseries
2023–2024	Fargo	Dorothy "Dot" Lyon / Nadine Bump	Season 5, Lead role
TBA	The Husbands	Lauren	Lead role; 8 episodes

== Awards and nominations ==
Accolades received by Juno Temple
Year	Award	Category	Work	Result	Ref.
2013	British Academy Film Awards	Rising Star Award	—N/a	Won	
2020	Prague Independent Film Festival	Best Actress	Lost Transmissions	Won	
2021	Hollywood Critics Association TV Awards	Best Supporting Actress in a Streaming Series, Comedy	Ted Lasso	Nominated	
2021	Primetime Emmy Awards	Outstanding Supporting Actress in a Comedy Series	Ted Lasso	Nominated	
2021	Screen Actors Guild Awards	Outstanding Performance by an Ensemble in a Comedy Series	Ted Lasso	Nominated	
2022	Hollywood Critics Association TV Awards	Best Supporting Actress in a Streaming Series, Comedy	Ted Lasso	Nominated	
2022	Hollywood Critics Association TV Awards	Best Supporting Actress in a Streaming Limited or Anthology Series or Movie	The Offer	Nominated	
2022	Screen Actors Guild Awards	Outstanding Performance by a Female Actor in a Comedy Series	Ted Lasso	Nominated	
2022	Screen Actors Guild Awards	Outstanding Performance by an Ensemble in a Comedy Series	Ted Lasso	Won	
2022	Primetime Emmy Awards	Outstanding Supporting Actress in a Comedy Series	Ted Lasso	Nominated	
2023	Critics' Choice Awards	Best Supporting Actress in a Limited Series or Movie Made for Television	The Offer	Nominated	
2023	Satellite Awards	Best Supporting Actress – Series, Miniseries or Television Film	The Offer	Won	
2023	Primetime Emmy Awards	Outstanding Supporting Actress in a Comedy Series	Ted Lasso	Nominated	
2024	Critics' Choice Awards	Best Actress in a Movie/Miniseries	Fargo	Nominated	
2024	Golden Globe Awards	Best Actress – Miniseries or Television Film	Fargo	Nominated	
2024	Screen Actors Guild Awards	Outstanding Performance by an Ensemble in a Comedy Series	Ted Lasso	Nominated	
2024	Television Critics Association Awards	Individual Achievement in Drama	Fargo	Nominated	
2024	Primetime Emmy Awards	Outstanding Lead Actress in a Limited or Anthology Series or Movie	Fargo	Nominated	
