= Reed Morano =

American cinematographer (born 1977)

- Born: April 15, 1977 (age 49); Omaha, Nebraska, U.S.
- Other names: Reed Dawson Morano; Reed Morano Walker
- Education: New York University (BA)
- Occupations: Film director; cinematographer
- Years active: 1998–present
- Spouse: Matt Walker (m. 2008; div. 2018)
- Children: 2
- Awards: Primetime Emmy Award for Outstanding Directing for a Drama Series (2017)
- Website: reedmorano.com

Reed Morano (born April 15, 1977) is an American film director and cinematographer. Morano was the first woman in history to win both the Emmy and Directors Guild Award for directing a drama series in the same year for the pilot episode of The Handmaid's Tale. Morano is known for her cinematography work on feature films such as Frozen River (2008), Kill Your Darlings (2013) and The Skeleton Twins (2014).

In 2013, Morano became the youngest member of the American Society of Cinematographers at that time, and one of only 14 women in an organization of approximately 345 active members. Two years later, she made her directorial debut with her critically acclaimed feature film Meadowland. She also directed the first three episodes of Hulu's The Handmaid's Tale, for which she won an Emmy Award. She also won a Directors Guild of America Award for directing a drama series for the episode "Offred" of The Handmaid's Tale, which makes her the first woman to win the Emmy and Directors Guild Award for directing a drama series.

== Early life ==
Morano was born in Omaha, Nebraska, one of two children of Lyn and Winslow Mankin. Sometime after she moved her with family to Minnesota at 8 months old, her parents divorced, and she and her brother, Justin (now a professor of climate science at Dartmouth College) lived with their mother on Long Island. After summering on Fire Island, they moved there year-round when her mother married Casey Morano. Morano acquired two older step-siblings and, later, half-siblings Jordan, Morgan and Ali. The blended family moved to Albuquerque, New Mexico, when Morano was in third grade; they returned to Long Island three years later, and Morano attended Beach Street Middle School in West Islip, New York. After further family moves, Morano attended high school in Hanover, New Hampshire.

Her father, Casey, realizing her interest in theater and drama, "gave me a video camera and said, 'You’re gonna be the family documentarian.' When it was time to go to college, I was going to apply to Boston University for journalism and dad said, 'You love telling stories and taking pictures, why not apply to film school?'"

Morano subsequently attended New York University and graduated from the Tisch School of the Arts Film and TV program in 2000. She returned to NYU as an adjunct cinematography professor and co-instructed the first Advanced Television classes offered.

== Career ==
=== As a cinematographer ===
Morano's cinematography has appeared regularly at the Sundance Film Festival beginning in 2008 with Frozen River (credited as Reed Dawson Morano), which won the Grand Jury prize. The film was also nominated for an Independent Spirit Award for Best Picture. In 2011, Little Birds, shot by Morano, premiered at Sundance as well. The following year, two films shot by Morano premiered there: a feature-length documentary about the band LCD Soundsystem, Shut Up and Play the Hits, and So Yong Kim’s For Ellen (credited as Reed Morano Walker), starring Paul Dano.

In 2013, Kill Your Darlings, a 35mm period piece about the beat poets, set in 1943, premiered there , and screened as the Toronto International Film Festival and the Venice film festival. The Inevitable Defeat of Mister & Pete (2013) premiered at Sundance as well. and theatrically released; In 2014, two feature films shot by Morano premiered there: The Skeleton Twins, a dark comedy starring Kristen Wiig and Bill Hader, directed by Craig Johnson, and Mark Jackson’s War Story, a dark drama filmed in Sicily starring Catherine Keener and Sir Ben Kingsley.

Morano also served as director of photography on season one of HBO's drama Looking in 2014. and took over as lead DP on Vinyl, produced by Martin Scorsese, Terence Winter and Mick Jagger.

=== As a director ===
Morano also served as her own director of photography on her directorial debut, the critically acclaimed drama Meadowland, starring Olivia Wilde, Luke Wilson, Giovanni Ribisi, Elisabeth Moss, Juno Temple and John Leguizamo. It premiered in the dramatic competition at the Tribeca Film Festival in April 2015.

In 2017, Morano directed the first three episodes of the television adaptation of Margaret Atwood's The Handmaid's Tale, which was released by the streaming service Hulu in April 2017. For her work on The Handmaid's Tale, she won an Emmy Award. She also won a Directors Guild of America Award for directing a drama series for the episode "Offred" of The Handmaid's Tale, which makes her the first woman in history to win both the Emmy and Directors Guild Award for directing a drama series in the same year.

In 2018, Morano directed and shot I Think We're Alone Now, a post-apocalyptic drama centering on the companionship between Del (Peter Dinklage) and Grace (Elle Fanning). The film premiered at the 2018 Sundance Film Festival, and was later released to theaters on September 14, 2018.

In 2020, Morano released her third feature film as director The Rhythm Section, starring Blake Lively, Jude Law and Sterling K. Brown.

== Personal life ==
Morano married fellow cinematographer and gaffer Matt Walker in 2008. They divorced in 2018. They have two sons together. Reed lives with her sons in Brooklyn, New York. Elder son Casey appeared in Morano's film Meadowland. In 2021 she began a relationship with actor-director Tim Robbins.

== Filmography ==
=== Cinematographer ===
Film

Year	Title	Director
2005	Brooklyn Battery	Joshua Rofé
2007	Once Upon a Film	Dex Decker
2008	Frozen River	Courtney Hunt
2011	Little Birds	Elgin James
2011	Yelling to the Sky	Victoria Mahoney
2012	For Ellen	So Yong Kim
2012	Free Samples	Jay Gammil
2012	The Magic of Belle Isle	Rob Reiner
2013	Kill Your Darlings	John Krokidas
2013	The Inevitable Defeat of Mister & Pete	George Tillman Jr.
2013	Autumn Blood	Markus Blunder
2014	The Skeleton Twins	Craig Johnson
2014	War Story	Mark Jackson
2014	And So It Goes	Rob Reiner
2015	Meadowland	Herself
2018	I Think We're Alone Now	Herself

Documentary film

Year	Title	Director	Notes
2007	Off the Grid: Life on the Mesa	Jeremy Stulberg; Randy Strulberg	With Ari Issler, Liz Rubin and Isabel Vega
2012	Shut Up and Play the Hits	Will Lovelce; DylanSouthern	
2017	Joan Didion: The Center Will Not Hold	Griffin Dunne	With Tom Hurwitz and William Rexer

Television

Year	Title	Director	Notes
2006	Cover Shot		22 episodes
2006-2008	Psychic Detectives		15 episodes
2009	Don't Sweat It	Josh Abrahamson; Brian Wray	2 episodes
2009	Closet Cases		2 episodes
2014	Looking	Andrew Haigh; Ryan Fleck; Joe Swanberg; Jamie Babbit	8 episodes
2016	Vinyl	Allen Coulter; S. J. Clarkson; Nicole Kassell; Jon S. Baird	5 episodes
2016	Divorce	Jesse Peretz	Episode "Pilot"

=== Director ===
Film

- Meadowland (2015)
- I Think We're Alone Now (2018)
- The Rhythm Section (2020)

Television

Year	Title	Director	Executive Producer	Episode(s)
2016	Halt and Catch Fire	Yes	No	"You Are Safe"
2017	Billions	Yes	No	"Risk Management"
2017	The Handmaid's Tale	Yes	Yes	"Offred"
2017	The Handmaid's Tale	Yes	Yes	"Birth Day"
2017	The Handmaid's Tale	Yes	Yes	"Late"
2026	Cape Fear	Yes	No	"Pierced"

== Videography ==
=== Cinematographer ===
Music videos

Year	Title	Artist
2016	"Sandcastles"	Beyoncé
2016	"No Love Like Yours"	Edward Sharpe and the Magnetic Zeros

Commercials

Title	Brand
"Eaten Alive"	1-800 Contacts
"Is It Still Paint?"	Benjamin Moore & Co.
"iPad Pro"	Apple
"Anthem"	CitiBank
	American Airlines

=== Director ===
Commercial

Title	Brand
"A Story Takes Flight"	Visit Dubai

== Accolades and recognition ==
In 2011, Morano was honored at the Women in Film and Television International's Crystal + Lucy awards with the 2011 Kodak Vision Award. The same year, she was named one of Variety's “10 Cinematographers to Watch”. Morano has also been featured as one of Ioncinema.com’s “American New Wave 25″ and one of five innovative cinematographers in ICG Magazine’s “Generation Next” spotlight.

Later in 2012, Morano's work was featured in IndieWire’s "On the Rise '12: 5 Cinematographers Lighting Up Screens in Recent Years." IndieWire also featured Morano as a “Heroine of Cinema” in both 2011 and 2013. In 2012, Morano was featured in Kodak’s long-running OnFilm series. The following year, she became the youngest member of the American Society of Cinematographers, and one of 14 women in an organization of approximately 345 active members.

In 2015, Morano was named Woman of the Year at the Fusion Film Festival.

In 2017, she won a Primetime Emmy Award for Outstanding Directing for a Drama Series for the Hulu series The Handmaid's Tale.
