= Little Birds (film) =

- Theatrical release poster
- Directed by: Elgin James
- Written by: Elgin James
- Produced by: Jamie Patricof; Alan Polsky; Gabe Polsky
- Starring: Juno Temple; Kay Panabaker; Kate Bosworth; Leslie Mann
- Cinematography: Reed Morano
- Edited by: Suzanne Spangler
- Distributed by: Millennium Entertainment
- Release dates: January 20, 2011 (Sundance Film Festival); August 29, 2012 (United States)
- Running time: 94 minutes
- Country: United States
- Language: English

Little Birds is a 2011 American film written and directed by Elgin James, and starring Juno Temple and Kay Panabaker. The film follows two girls who leave home to follow two skateboarders to Los Angeles and is loosely based on the life of director Elgin James. The film premiered at the Sundance Film Festival, with Millennium Entertainment acquiring the North American rights to the film.

== Plot ==
Lily and Alison are best friends living in a poverty-stricken California town near the Salton Sea. The two are complete opposites: Lily is a suicidal rebellious girl who lives with her single mother, Margaret, while Alison is a cautious and careful girl who lives with her alcoholic dad. Alison finds solace under her uncle Hogan's automotives and horses while Lily wants to flee her troubled home life as soon as possible. Together, the two girls venture into their secluded town and join skateboarding boys from Los Angeles: Louis, David and Jesse, with whom Lily soon becomes smitten. Before the boys leave, Jesse kisses Lily and writes his number onto her arm, which upsets Alison.

Lily asks Alison to borrow Hogan's truck so they can meet up with Jesse and his friends in Los Angeles and Alison reluctantly agrees. When they stop at a convenience store, Lily saves Alison as she gets caught trying to return the goods Lily stole for them. The two soon find the three boys and Alison drives them to their place. While walking in the streets, Lily bumps into a hustler and she demands an apology. When the man tries to reason with her, David hits him over head with a skateboard and the five run away, leaving Alison in shock. The group settles at the boys' abandoned rundown apartment where other homeless teenagers reside. Alison tries to warn Lily that Jesse might be more dangerous than they think but Lily refuses to listen. Alison shares an intimate moment with Louis but quickly rebuffs him when he starts groping her.

In the morning, Lily and Jesse break into an empty house where Jesse explains that it used to be his home until his family moved to Arizona but he decided to return to L.A. on his own. Meanwhile, Alison calls her uncle Hogan and apologizes for taking the truck. Hogan urges her to come home and Alison promises to bring Lily back. Back at the house, Jesse notices Lily's self-harm scars when they are kissing. He is intrigued by her suicidal demeanor and also reveals his scar on his chest to make Lily feel better. David discovers a dating website and convinces a hesitant Jesse to use Lily as a bait for scamming and stealing from older men. Lily agrees and meets up with an old man and lures him to their place where the boys, along with a hesitant Alison, threaten the man with a gun in exchange for money before setting him free.

Alison makes Lily promise that they will go home but David gets into an argument with Alison and throws her out of the group. Alison tries to convince Lily to come along but Lily refuses, saying that she is staying with Jesse. The two argue and their friendship is damaged. Lily continues to help with the scam and meets up with a middle-aged guy, John. However, John is a violent psychopath and overpowers the boys. He knocks out David and Louis while Jesse runs away, leaving a terrified Lily. John forces a crying Lily onto the mattress and prepares to rape her but he is shot in the back. The shooter is revealed to be Alison, who decided to come back for Lily one last time. The girls reconcile and Lily agrees to come home. On their way back, Alison pulls over near the beach. They both step out and enjoy their last moments in Los Angeles before finally heading back home.

== Cast ==
- Juno Temple as Lily Hobart
- Kay Panabaker as Alison Hoffman
- Kate Bosworth as Bonnie Muller
- Leslie Mann as Margaret Hobart
- Neal McDonough as Hogan
- David Warshofsky as Joseph Hoffman
- Kathleen Gati as Sally Heron
- Kyle Gallner as Jesse MacNamara
- Carlos PenaVega as Louis Estes
- Chris Coy as David Riley
- Joel McKinnon Miller as Michael White
- JR Bourne as John Gretton
- Mike Erwin as Mark Muller

== Soundtrack ==
1. "Tinted Soft Green" – Elgin James & The Suicide Gang
2. "Tender Branch" – Tift Merritt
3. "Too Far" – Linee
4. "This Town" – Linee
5. "I Will Die Young" – Elgin James & The Suicide Gang
6. "Another Man Don' Gone" – Odetta & Larry
7. "September Gurls" – Big Star
8. "Anenome" – The Brian Jonestown Massacre
9. "Lily & Jesse's Theme" – Chad Gilbert
10. "Boy's Theme" – Elgin James & The Suicide Gang
11. "Alison's Theme (feat. Leslie Stevens)" – Elgin James & The Suicide Gang
12. "Little Birds" – Tift Merritt

== Development ==
James began working on Little Birds around 2009, loosely basing the film on his own life experiences. James was originally working on an autobiographical project about he and his best friend who left their small towns and joined a gang in Boston. That film had Justin Timberlake attached to portray James and Nick Cassavetes attached to direct. However, James was worried the film would ultimately "glamorize the violent lifestyle" he'd recently left behind, so he wrote Little Birds instead, substituting two fifteen-year-old girls for him and his best friend. He chose to focus on the characters of "Lily" and "Alison" after seeing a teenage girl riding on the back of a bike in the Salton Sea, with James saying "You could just tell that she was on fire and she was never going to get out of there", referencing how he felt about being trapped in his own small town as a kid.

Juno Temple was signed onto the film and James offered her the choice of playing either Lily or Alison. She chose to portray Lily, citing that she connected with the character more and "wanted to set her free". Temple and James worked on the film together for two years, becoming close. They continue to collaborate and in interviews refer to each other as "best friends" and "family." James has said he considers Little Birds to be a love song to the strong women in his life, including Temple.

After auditioning hundreds of actresses, Kay Panabaker came on to the film just one week before filming. She and Temple became close by having sleepovers in each other's hotel rooms during the shoot and "watching bad movies and eating junk food together."

The film was produced through the Sundance Institute Labs, with producer Jamie Patricof expressing support for Little Birds.

James finished the film shortly before its screening in 2011 at the Sundance Film Festival before having to attend a trial for his actions while part of Friends Stand United.

== Reception ==
While debuting to favorable reception at the Sundance Film Festival in 2011, when Little Birds had a wider release in 2012 it had much more divisive reviews. Some critics criticized it for being nihilistic and without hope. The New York Post called it "An unpleasant little film about a sulking, self-mutilating 15-year-old girl." Film School Rejects called it "A prime example of miserabilist indie cinema and, despite it's [sic] strong craft, consistently a tough sit."

Entertainment Weekly called Little Birds "A touching and distinctive achievement", and The Hollywood Reporter called it "An assured debut (...) vividly captures the excitement of rule-breaking adolescent adventure." The New Yorker described it as being full of "Shimmering fatalism."

Some critics addressed both the film's dark themes and its strengths. MSN's The Hit List said "There’s such bleakness in this film, yet it’s one of the most visually beautiful films I’ve seen." Betsy Sharkey of the Los Angeles Times said of the characters Lily and Alison "Theirs is a case of innocence not simply lost but crushed like a cigarette under the heel of a shoe." Also saying while occasionally "frustrating" the film also has "Bursts of brilliance and moments of aching vulnerability."

About the film, Elgin James told The New York Daily News: “My goal is to take the wreckage of my life and turn it into something beautiful. Hopefully, ‘Little Birds’ accomplishes that.” Juno Temple has said, "I can’t predict what people will feel when they see it, I just want them to feel something." On the same note, Kay Panabaker says "We’re not trying to be award-winning. We’re not trying to get people to love it. We just want people to see the film and feel something."

On the review aggregator website Rotten Tomatoes, 59% of 22 critics' reviews are positive. Metacritic, which uses a weighted average, assigned the film a score of 41 out of 100, based on 9 critics, indicating "mixed or average" reviews.

Little Birds was named one of the 25 Best Summer Movies by Complex, and Paste Magazine named it one of the Fifty Best Films of 2012. Variety included James on their 16th annual list of "Directors to Watch."

It was released in theaters on August 29, 2012, and on home video/DVD on January 1, 2013.

== Awards and nominations ==
Little Birds was among the winners of the National Board of Review: Top Ten Independent Films of 2012.

Year	Award	Category	Nominated work	Result
2011	Palm Springs International Film Festival	Directors to Watch	Elgin James	Won
2011	Sundance Film Festival	Grand Jury Prize	Elgin James	Nominated
2011	Zurich Film Festival	Golden Eye	Elgin James	Nominated
2012	National Board of Review	Top Ten Independent Films	Little Birds	Won
