= 454 Big Block =

American metalcore band

- Origin: Boston, Massachusetts
- Genres: Metalcore
- Years active: 1995–1998
- Labels: Century Media Records, Big Wheel Recreation
- Past members: Elgin James; Dean Baltulonis; Ralph Dinunzio; Mike Hill; Nick Kean; Kevin Norton; Jeff Caxide; Taras Hrabec; Alex Garcia-Rivera

454 Big Block was an American metalcore band from Boston.

== History ==
454 Big Block was formed by four members of the recently disbanded Boston Hardcore band Wrecking Crew. The last track of 454 Big Block's second (and final) album was a re-recording of the Wrecking Crew song "Why Must They?"

Record label Century Media had been in talks with Wrecking Crew before the band changed its sound and reformed as 454 Big Block. Originally vocalist Elgin James decided not to join the new project, but when the band's new vocalist did not last for long, James changed his mind.

The band released two albums, one for Century Media Records, the other for Big Wheel Recreation, and toured with Marilyn Manson, Clutch, Deadguy, Bloodlet and Earth Crisis before breaking up. The group's performances were known to attract a violent audience.

In 1998, three members (James, Baltulonis and Garcia-Rivera) formed another band named The World Is My Fuse. As they began to focus their efforts on the new band, 454 Big Block came to an end.

== Band members ==
Elgin James – Vocals (1995–1998)

James was a founding member of 454 Big Block. He had originally replaced Glenn Dudley as the frontman for Wrecking Crew before that group disbanded. He was well known in Boston at the time as the founder of the militant Straight Edge gang FSU. After 454 Big Block broke up, he went on to front the bands The World Is My Fuse (with Baltulonis and Garcia-Rivera) and Jaded Salingers, play guitar with Righteous Jams, and release a folk-punk solo album. Today he is as a filmmaker.

Dean Baltulonis – Guitar (1995–1998)

Baltulonis was a founding member of 454 Big Block, previously playing with Wrecking Crew and Eye For An Eye (with Kevin Norton). His next band was The World Is My Fuse with James and Garcia-Rivera. He currently produces records at Wild Arctic studio in Queens, New York.

Ralph Dinunzio – Guitar (1995–1997)

Dinunzio was a founding member of 454 Big Block, previously playing with Wrecking Crew. He quit while the band was touring for the second album.

Nick Kean – Bass (1995–1996)

Kean was a founding member of 454 Big Block. He quit the band before they recorded the second album.

Taras Hrabec – Drums (1995–1996)

Hrabec was a founding member of 454 Big Block, previously playing with Wrecking Crew. He quit the band before they recorded the second album.

Alex Garcia-Rivera – Drums (1996–1998)

Garcia-Rivera recorded drums for the band's second album and toured afterward. His next band was The World Is My Fuse with James and Baltulonis. Later, he played in the bands Get High, Good Clean Fun, Saves the Day, Give Up the Ghost, Avoid One Thing, Bars, and Bloodhorse. Today he is a recording engineer. He had previously been in the bands Kingpin and Shelter.

Kevin Norton – Bass (1996–1997)

Norton joined before the band recorded their second album. He was previously in Eye For An Eye (with Dean Baltulonis). He left the band to move to California where he joined Straight Faced.

Jeff Caxide – Bass (1997–1998)

Caxide, formerly of the band Cable, joined while 454 Big Block was touring the second album. Afterward he joined the band Isis, then co-founded the bands Red Sparowes and Palms.

Mike Hill – Guitar (1997–1998)

Hill joined while the band was touring the second album. He was previously in the band Otis, and later founded and fronted Tombs.

== Discography ==
Albums

- Your Jesus (1995) Century Media Records
- Save Me From Myself (1997) Big Wheel Recreation

Singles

- "Down" (4-Track Limited Edition Red 7-inch EP) Big Wheel Recreation (1997)

Compilations

- Identity 2 ("Dead Inside") Century Media Records (1995)
- Identity?! Songs Of Hatred ("Held Down") Century Media Records (1995)
- Bloodlines – The Seeds of Rebellion Century Media Records ("Held Down") (1996)
- Skaters Have More Fun ("Your Jesus") EFA Imports (1996)
- Ten Years Later...The Comp ("Repentance") Bossa Nova Records (1997)
- They Came From Massachusetts ("Born Human") Big Wheel Recreation (1999)

== Filmography ==
Documentaries

- Release (1998)
- Boston Beatdown: See the World Through Our Eyes – Volume II (2004)

Music Videos

- "Born Human"
