= Offred =

Offred may refer to:

- Offred (The Handmaid's Tale novel character), the novel version of the character
- Offred (The Handmaid's Tale TV series character), the television version of the character
- "Offred" (The Handmaid's Tale episode)
