= Jordan Scott (filmmaker) =

British filmmaker

- Born: Jordan Watson Scott; London, England
- Occupations: Filmmaker, photographer
- Father: Ridley Scott
- Relatives: Jake Scott (paternal half-brother); Luke Scott (paternal half-brother); Tony Scott (paternal uncle)

Jordan Watson Scott is a British filmmaker and photographer. She is the daughter of director Ridley Scott and advertising executive Sandy Watson. She is the niece of director Tony Scott and half-sister of directors Luke and Jake Scott.

Scott directed the feature film Cracks, an adaptation of a novel by Sheila Kohler. She also directed All the Invisible Children (Segment Jonathan), Portrait, and Never Never. She has directed commercials for Prada, Nike, Amazon.com, and Land Rover.

== Filmography ==
Year	Title	Notes
2004	Portrait	Short film
2005	All the Invisible Children	Co-director; segment: "Jonathan"
2009	Cracks	Feature directorial debut
2024	A Sacrifice	Writer and director
