= I Think We're Alone Now (film) =

- Theatrical release poster
- Directed by: Reed Morano
- Written by: Mike Makowsky
- Produced by: Fred Berger; Brian Kavanaugh-Jones; Fernando Loureiro; Roberto Vasconcellos; Peter Dinklage; Mike Makowsky
- Starring: Peter Dinklage; Elle Fanning; Paul Giamatti; Charlotte Gainsbourg
- Cinematography: Reed Morano
- Edited by: Madeleine Gavin
- Music by: Adam Taylor
- Production companies: Automatik Entertainment; Exhibit Entertainment; IM Global; Ferrotame Films; Slater Hall Pictures; Estuary Films
- Distributed by: Momentum Pictures
- Release dates: January 21, 2018 (Sundance); September 14, 2018 (United States)
- Running time: 99 minutes
- Country: United States
- Language: English
- Box office: $3,162

I Think We're Alone Now is a 2018 American post-apocalyptic romance drama film directed by Reed Morano, who also acted as cinematographer, and written by Mike Makowsky. It stars Peter Dinklage and Elle Fanning as two survivors who learn to live together after a pandemic wipes out Earth's population.

The film had its world premiere at the Sundance Film Festival on January 21, 2018. It was released on September 14, 2018, by Momentum Pictures.

== Plot ==
Del lives alone in a small town after an unspecified but sudden (people died where they sat) apocalyptic event has killed off the human population "on a Tuesday afternoon". Believing he is the last man on Earth, Del has set about leading a peaceful existence in his hometown, living in the library where he used to work and spending the day clearing out people's homes and burying the dead.

One night, he is awakened by fireworks. The following day, he discovers a young woman named Grace, unconscious in her car, having gotten into a drunken car accident. Initially, Del is unwelcoming toward the woman, who follows him around and urges him to let her stay. When the woman decides to leave, Del stops her and allows for a theoretical trial period in case they need each other.

Grace is a noisy, erratic presence, but Del reluctantly becomes used to her, feeding her and teaching her his methods for clearing the homes of the dead. When Grace finds a dog, she showers it with love and attention, but after the dog bites Del, he lets it loose, and it runs away. When he admits this to Grace, she is furious and reminds him that while he was bitter and alone in his previous life, she was loved and happy. A repentant Del shows her his greenhouse and asks her to continue clearing houses with him.

On one of her trips to search for houses, Grace comes across a house that has not been cleared yet, and which Del does not want to clear. She realizes that it belonged to Del's family. Grace persuades Del to clean the house and bury the body of his mother. Afterwards, Grace informs Del that she has something to tell him but instead avoids addressing the topic directly and kisses him.

The following morning, Del wakes up in the house Grace has been using and is surprised to hear voices downstairs. He meets two new survivors, Patrick and Violet, who introduce themselves as Grace's parents. It is revealed that there were thousands of survivors of the apocalypse who have formed a community. Because Del has never left his town, he has not been made aware.

Del is upset and leaves, but Grace chases him and begs him to keep her with him, saying that the couple are not her real parents and that she was paired with them when she reached the survivors' commune in California. Del ignores her and leaves. Patrick visits Del at the library, where he urges Del to come with him, hinting at different experiments occurring in California that focus on the mind.

Soon thereafter, Grace leaves with the couple, and Del returns to his solitary lifestyle, though he is now wracked with loneliness. No longer capable of living alone, Del abandons his small town and drives to the address Patrick left him, hoping to find Grace. Del sneaks into Grace's home to see her, and while there, sees she has undergone more behavior modification surgery to erase the lingering trauma caused by the loss of her family. While Del and Grace are trying to escape, Patrick attempts to stop them. He explains that the only way for the human race to move forward is to forget the pain of their lives before the apocalypse struck, and to erase all negative emotions from their minds. Grace shoots Patrick. Violet is not upset as she still remembers her previous life and the daughter she lost, despite the behavior modification she has been subjected to. Del and Grace find the city populated with disconcertingly happy survivors, all blissfully and willfully ignorant of their past trauma. Del and Grace leave the city with no stated or implied goal or destination.

== Cast ==
- Peter Dinklage as Del
- Elle Fanning as Grace
- Paul Giamatti as Patrick
- Charlotte Gainsbourg as Violet

== Production ==
In October 2016, Peter Dinklage and Elle Fanning were attached to star as Del and Grace, respectively. Principal photography was done in New York state, including the towns of Hastings-on-Hudson and Haverstraw.

== Soundtrack ==
- "Working Man", written by Geddy Lee and Alex Lifeson, performed by Rush
- "Finding My Way", written by Geddy Lee and Alex Lifeson, performed by Rush
- "LA Knights", performed by Four Step Plan
- "Livin' Proof", performed by Group Home
- "Free The Mind", performed by Johann Johannsson
- "Cuban Jam", written by La Palabra, performed by Orquesta

== Release ==
The film had its world premiere at the Sundance Film Festival on January 21, 2018, where it won the U.S. Dramatic Special Jury Award for Excellence in Filmmaking. A month later, Momentum Pictures acquired distribution rights to the film. It was released on September 14, 2018.

== Critical response ==
The review aggregator website Rotten Tomatoes reported a 63% approval rating, based on 41 reviews, with an average rating of 6.3/10. The website's critical consensus reads, "I Think We're Alone Now benefits from an absorbing aesthetic and solid work from its leads, although it's still somewhat less than the sum of its post-apocalyptic parts." Metacritic, which uses a weighted average, assigned a score of 51 out of 100 based on 16 critics, indicating "mixed or average" reviews.

Peter Travers of Rolling Stone gave the film 2 stars out of 5, saying, "the emotional investment we make in Del and Grace comes to nothing, as the plot ties up loose ends without a single surprise or a scintilla of genuine emotion." Todd McCarthy of The Hollywood Reporter wrote: "It's hard to figure what induced director Reed Morano, who did such a fine job directing the first three episodes of The Handmaid's Tale last season, to take on such a script, one so devoid of surprise, intriguing notions and compelling scenes." Vikram Murthi of The A.V. Club gave the film a "C" grade, saying, "Morano's film wants to examine the emotional consequences of immersing oneself in trauma, but Makowsky's script merely paws at the edges of the idea rather than diving into the knottiness of it."
