= Meadowland (film) =

- Theatrical release poster
- Directed by: Reed Morano
- Written by: Chris Rossi
- Produced by: Aaron L. Gilbert; Margot Hand; Matt Tauber; Olivia Wilde
- Starring: Olivia Wilde; Luke Wilson; Juno Temple; Elisabeth Moss; Giovanni Ribisi; John Leguizamo; Merritt Wever; Ty Simpkins
- Cinematography: Reed Morano
- Edited by: Madeleine Gavin
- Music by: Adam Taylor
- Production company: Bron Studios
- Distributed by: Cinedigm
- Release dates: April 17, 2015 (Tribeca Film Festival); October 16, 2015 (United States)
- Running time: 105 minutes
- Countries: Canada; United States
- Language: English

Meadowland is a 2015 drama film written by Chris Rossi and directed by Reed Morano in her feature debut. The film stars Olivia Wilde, Luke Wilson, Juno Temple, Elisabeth Moss, Giovanni Ribisi, John Leguizamo, and Ty Simpkins.

The film had its world premiere at the Tribeca Film Festival on April 17, 2015. The film was released in a limited release on October 16, 2015, prior to being released on video on demand on October 23, 2015, by Cinedigm.

== Plot ==
Sarah and Phil are on a road trip with their son, Jessie. They stop at a gas station to buy snacks and so their son can go to the bathroom; however, in the time it takes for them to make their purchases they find that their son is missing.

Sarah, who is a teacher, deals with her grief by obsessing over one of her students, Adam, who has Asperger's. He is ostracized by the other kids and treated poorly by his foster mother, Shannon. Phil meanwhile begins to attend a support group for parents who have lost their children.

Despite claiming that she knows their son is still alive, in the hazy aftermath of this loss, Sarah begins a downward spiral. Phil, a New York City police officer, starts to lose sight of his morals as Sarah puts herself in increasingly dangerous situations.

== Cast ==
- Olivia Wilde as Sarah
- Luke Wilson as Phil
- Juno Temple as Mackenzie
- Merritt Wever as Kelly
- Giovanni Ribisi as Tim
- Ty Simpkins as Adam
- Elisabeth Moss as Shannon
- Scott Mescudi as Jason
- Mark Feuerstein as Rob
- Kevin Corrigan as Joe
- John Leguizamo as Pete
- Eden Duncan-Smith as Alma

== Production ==
On February 11, 2014, it was announced that Olivia Wilde would star in and executive-produce the dramatic film Meadowland, which Reed Morano would direct and shoot from a script by Chris Rossi. On July 30, Luke Wilson, Natasha Lyonne, Elisabeth Moss and Eden Duncan-Smith joined the cast. On August 18, Giovanni Ribisi, Ty Simpkins, Juno Temple, Scott Mescudi, Mark Feuerstein, and Kevin Corrigan were added to the cast.

=== Filming ===
Principal photography began on August 18, 2014, in New York City.

== Release ==
The film had its world premiere at the Tribeca Film Festival on April 17, 2015. On June 24, 2015 it was announced that Cinedigm had acquired distribution rights to the film and planned an October 2015 theatrical release. The film had a limited release on October 16, 2015, prior to being released through video on demand on October 23, 2015.

== Reception ==
On Rotten Tomatoes, the film has a rating of 92% based on reviews from 25 critics, with an average rating of 7/10. On Metacritic, the film has a score of 67 out of 100, based on 11 critics, indicating "generally favorable reviews".

Jordan Hoffman of The Guardian gave the film four stars out of five, and said, "What Meadowland refuses to do, to its great credit, is conform to expectations." Chicago Sun-Times critic Richard Roeper gave the film three out of four stars, and wrote that "The filmmaking is sure-handed, the performances authentic." Chuck Bowen from Slant Magazine gave the film three out of four stars, and also praised the performances: "Both Olivia Wilde and Luke Wilson understand the greatest pain of loss to be rooted in its searing inexpressibility."
