= The Rhythm Section =

2020 film directed by Reed Morano

- Theatrical release poster
- Directed by: Reed Morano
- Screenplay by: Mark Burnell
- Based on: The Rhythm Section by Mark Burnell
- Produced by: Barbara Broccoli; Michael G. Wilson
- Starring: Blake Lively; Jude Law; Sterling K. Brown
- Cinematography: Sean Bobbitt
- Edited by: Joan Sobel
- Music by: Steve Mazzaro
- Production companies: Eon Productions; Global Road Entertainment; Storyoscopic Films
- Distributed by: Paramount Pictures
- Release date: January 31, 2020 (United States)
- Running time: 110 minutes
- Countries: United Kingdom; United States
- Language: English
- Budget: $50 million
- Box office: $6 million

The Rhythm Section is a 2020 action thriller film directed by Reed Morano, with a screenplay by Mark Burnell based on his novel of the same name. Starring Blake Lively, Jude Law and Sterling K. Brown, it follows a grieving woman who seeks revenge after discovering that the plane crash that killed her family was a terrorist attack.

It was released in the United States on January 31, 2020, by Paramount Pictures. It received mixed reviews, with critics generally praising Lively's performance but critical of the plot. It was a box-office bomb as it grossed $6 million against a $50 million budget, with the all-time worst wide-opening weekend for a film playing on over 3,000 screens. Two weeks later, it suffered the biggest-ever drop in screens when it was pulled from 2,955, with Paramount projected to lose $30–40 million.

== Plot ==
Three years after her family's death in a plane crash, Stephanie Patrick has become a drug-addicted prostitute in a London brothel. She is approached by journalist Keith Proctor, who believes the plane crash was a terrorist attack that was covered up by the government.

Stephanie leaves the brothel to live with Proctor and studies his research on the crash, which suggests that it was caused by a bomb made by a postgraduate engineering student named Reza, who attends university in London. Stephanie buys a black market gun and finds Reza in the university cafeteria, but cannot bring herself to shoot him. He leaves, while also stealing her bag, which contains documents linked to Proctor. Hours later, she finds Proctor murdered in his apartment.

Through Proctor's notes, Stephanie discovers his source is disgraced MI6 agent Iain Boyd, whom she finds living in seclusion in Scotland. Boyd tells her Reza has vanished after her confrontation with him, and he reluctantly agrees to train her to hunt him down.

Boyd says Reza is a bombmaker hired by a terrorist known as U-17, who carried out the bombing at the behest of an Islamist cleric who was later killed in a drone strike. The plane was downed to assassinate liberal Muslim reformer Abdul Kaif; Kaif's father Suleman funded Proctor's investigation into the crash. Stephanie assumes the identity of Petra Reuter, an assassin killed by Boyd whose body was never found.

Boyd sends her to Madrid to meet ex-CIA agent Marc Serra, who seemingly agrees to help. Stephanie asks Suleman to finance her mission, promising to avenge his son; he refuses, being unaware of Proctor's death and believing Proctor had extorted him. Kaif's mother Alia offers her the money.

Stephanie assassinates several of the bombing conspirators. Serra tells her that U-17 is Reza himself. She tracks him to the South of France where he is preparing a bus bombing and, after a struggle on the bus, she leaves him to die as his own bomb explodes. She realizes that Serra has been U-17 all along and was using her to kill all connections to him. She kills Serra with a syringe at his home, before visiting Alia to report her mission a success.

Boyd meets Stephanie in London and warns her to disappear, as MI6 has offered to take him back if he can eliminate the newly resurgent "Petra". She says her name is Stephanie, and walks away.

== Cast ==
- Blake Lively as Stephanie Patrick, a woman who lost her entire family in a plane crash, causing her to develop a drug addiction and become a prostitute to support her habit. Upon learning that the crash was staged by terrorists, she trains for months under a former spy, learning combat, intelligence-gathering, and disguise skills, and takes on the identity of freelance assassin Petra Reuter.
- Jude Law as Iain Boyd, a former MI6 operative who now lives in a cabin in rural Scotland. He becomes Stephanie's mentor and handler as she investigates her family's deaths.
- Sterling K. Brown as Marc Serra, a former CIA officer who now makes a living as a private intelligence broker
- Max Casella as Giler
- Geoff Bell as Green
- Richard Brake as Lehmans
- Raza Jaffrey as Keith Proctor, a freelance investigative journalist investigating the plane crash
- Tawfeek Barhom as Reza Mohammad, a terrorist responsible for making and planting the bomb that killed Stephanie's family
- Nasser Memarzia as Suleman Kaif, the father of one of the terror attack victims
- Amira Ghazalla as Alia Kaif, the mother of one of the terror attack victims. She provides funding for Stephanie's efforts to kill the bomber.

== Production ==
In July 2005, it was announced that New Line Cinema had acquired the rights to The Rhythm Section by Mark Burnell with the intent of making a franchise centered around the character of Stephanie Patrick. That same month, it was reported New Line Cinema had hired Burnell to write the adaptation.

The film was originally to be made by Stuart Ford, who had championed the film, EON Productions's Barbara Broccoli and Michael G. Wilson, longtime collaborators of Ford's and producers of the James Bond films. In mid-2016, he suddenly sold his production company, IM Global, to Donald Tang. It became harder to get financing in place due to complicated Chinese rules that Tang's company had to follow, especially after Ford left a year later. Around that time, it was reported that Paramount Pictures had acquired the rights to the project. It had a production budget of around $50 million. The change in studio and financial delays meant that problems with Burnell's adaptation of his novel were never fully resolved.

Principal photography on the film began in December 2017 in Dublin, Ireland. Production was halted for six months after Blake Lively broke her knuckle on the film set; insurance covered the extra costs this delay created. Sterling K. Brown joined the cast, as production resumed in Spain in mid-2018. In July 2018, filming took place in Almería with Jude Law and Lively.

Steve Mazzaro composed the film score, with additional music provided by Lisa Gerrard, and Hans Zimmer serves as score producer for the film. Remote Control Publishing has released the soundtrack.

During post-production, Broccoli and Wilson clashed with Reed Morano and Lively over what kind of film they wanted The Rhythm Section to be. Because of EON's involvement, Paramount had expected a Bond-type movie with a female lead, which Morano and Lively wanted, while EON sought to make a more character-focused, slower Euro-noir film like La Femme Nikita. Ultimately, the latter won.

== Release ==
The film remained on the shelf for a long time. In late 2018, Paramount did a test screening in Sherman Oaks, which reportedly returned some of the worst results in the studio's history. The studio accordingly cut the film's advertising budget and scheduled it for release on February 22, 2019. That date was again postponed, as the studio left any material from the film out of its preview of upcoming releases at CinemaCon, seen by observers as a sign Paramount had drastically reduced its expectations for The Rhythm Section. The new November 22 release date was postponed again to its final January 2020 date, so that Lively would be available to promote the film, following the birth of her third child.

== Reception ==
=== Box office ===
In the United States and Canada, the film was released alongside Gretel & Hansel, and was originally projected to gross $9–12 million from 3,049 theaters in its opening weekend. However, after making just $1.2 million on its first day (including $235,000 from Thursday night previews), projections were lowered to $3 million. It went on to debut to $2.8 million, marking the worst opening weekend ever for a film playing in over 3,000 theaters. It is estimated the film would lose the studio $30–40 million. The film made $1 million in its second weekend, and then its third weekend made $25,602. It was pulled from 2,955 theaters (97.5%, 3,049 to 94), marking the largest third-weekend theater drop in history, beating The Darkest Minds' record of 2,679. (Note: That record is for the most total screens dropped. The record for the largest portion of screens a film has been dropped from was set by February 2017's A Cure for Wellness, which went from 2,704 to 88 screens between its second and third weeks, for a 97.8 percent decline, compared to 97.5 percent for The Rhythm Section.)

=== Critical response ===
On review aggregator Rotten Tomatoes, the film holds an approval rating of 29% based on 180 reviews, with an average rating of 4.8/10. The website's critical consensus reads: "Blake Lively delivers an impressive lead performance, but The Rhythm Section plods predictably through a story that could have used some flashier riffs." On Metacritic, the film has a weighted average score of 45 out of 100, based on 36 critics, indicating "mixed or average reviews". Audiences polled by CinemaScore gave the film an average grade of "C+" on an A+ to F scale, while PostTrak reported it received 2.5 out of 5 stars in their polling, with 35% of people saying they would definitely recommend it.

Peter DeBruge, writing on the film in Variety, noted that Stephanie — unlike the female assassin protagonists in Atomic Blonde, Red Sparrow and La Femme Nikita — displayed a realistic "near-incompetence in the face of danger [that] makes her relatable in ways very few cinematic assassins have ever been." Richard Newby of The Hollywood Reporter agreed: "Stephanie's training gives her just enough to get by, and her fighting skills are unrefined and ugly ... the film's car chase is one of collateral damage, close calls, and not a single smooth turn in sight. Even Stephanie's missions are largely botched incidents she barely makes it out of alive." He bemoaned the fact that a film that, despite its flaws, offered a fresher, more realistic take on the genre — "the Blue Ruin of espionage films" — along with a heroine not from a comic-book franchise, had been so thoroughly rejected by the audiences and critics that regularly demanded something that defied conventions.
