= Cracks (2009 film) =

2009 drama film

- UK theatrical release poster
- Directed by: Jordan Scott
- Screenplay by: Ben Court; Caroline Ip; Jordan Scott
- Based on: Cracks by Sheila Kohler
- Produced by: Kwesi Dickson; Andrew Lowe; Julie Payne; Rosalie Swedlin; Christine Vachon
- Starring: Eva Green; Juno Temple; María Valverde; Imogen Poots; Sinéad Cusack
- Cinematography: John Mathieson
- Edited by: Valerio Bonelli
- Music by: Javier Navarrete
- Production companies: Scott Free; Industry Entertainment; Killer Films; John Wells Productions; HandMade Films International; Future Films; Légende; StudioCanal; Bord Scannán na hÉireann / Irish Film Board; Element Pictures; Cracks the Film Ltd; Antena 3 Films
- Distributed by: StudioCanal (United Kingdom, Ireland, Benelux and France); Optimum Releasing (United Kingdom and Ireland); IFC Films (United States)
- Release dates: 12 September 2009 (TIFF); 4 December 2009 (United Kingdom and Ireland); 30 December 2009 (France); 18 March 2011 (United States)
- Running time: 104 minutes
- Countries: Ireland; United Kingdom; Spain; United States; France
- Language: English

Cracks is a 2009 independent psychological drama film directed by Jordan Scott, starring Eva Green, Juno Temple, María Valverde and Imogen Poots. It was released theatrically in the United Kingdom and Ireland on 4 December 2009. In the United States, it was released by IFC Films theatrically on 18 March 2011 and premiered on television on Showtime as part of an ongoing pay television broadcast deal with IFC later in the year.

The film was produced in May 2008, written for the screen by Caroline Ip, Ben Court and Jordan Scott, based on the 1999 novel written by Sheila Kohler. Kwesi Dickson, Andrew Lowe, Julie Payne, Rosalie Swedlin and Christine Vachon were the producers. Ridley and Tony Scott served as executive producers. The film was mostly filmed in County Wicklow, Ireland.

== Plot ==
During the 1930s in St. Mathilda's, a strict elite British boarding school, a clique of girls idolise their enigmatic diving instructor, Miss G., who is a former student. Di Radfield has a crush on Miss G., and is the firm favourite and ringleader of her dormitory mates. When a beautiful, worldly aristocratic Spanish girl named Fiamma Corona arrives at the school, Miss G.'s focus shifts from the other girls to her. It becomes a triangle: Miss G. becomes obsessed with exotic Fiamma. Fiamma is disturbed by Miss G.'s somewhat overt advances and also openly disgusted by her hypocrisies and deceptions about her past. Di is jealous and makes Fiamma's life hell.

Miss G., claiming to be a world traveller, travels to a nearby parochial town for provisions. Several locals notice her inappropriate behavior and clothing. After several local men approach her, she becomes visibly upset and is in a near-panic when she returns to the school. It is revealed that Miss G. suffers from severe agoraphobia whenever she leaves the school grounds. Her tales of exotic adventures are repeated accounts she has read, and she has rarely left the school since childhood.

Fiamma being bullied culminates with Di and her group frog-marching her out of the school and telling her to return home. Unable to phone for help or return to Spain, Fiamma is later picked up by the police and taken back to the school.

Di and Fiamma begin to develop a friendship. When Fiamma passes out after drinking alcohol at a dorm party, Miss G. brings Fiamma to her room and molests her while she is unconscious, telling her fantasies of them travelling the world together as lovers. Di witnesses this and flees.

The next morning, Fiamma is visibly upset, and Miss G. is equally distressed as she runs after her. Fiamma is furious for what Miss G. did and implies that she will tell others, before storming off into the forest. Di is broody, and eventually lies to her gang that Fiamma seduced Miss G. Miss G. realizes her career may be over and is terrified of being kicked out of the school. She manipulates Di's affection for her into anger. She says that Fiamma will lie about her molesting her (despite it being true) and plans to get her fired.

Di's gang confront Fiamma, who declines to answer Di's vicious questions, trying to explain what really happened. She hints at Miss G.'s lies and character defects. Fiamma runs into the forest as things become more violent as the girls catch up with her. Under Di's direction, they beat her with sticks and fists. Fiamma has an asthma attack, and the girls stop, terrified, before running to get help. Di runs into Miss G., who witnessed the chase and beating but made no attempt to stop it. Miss G. says she will stay with Fiamma and directs Di to get a teacher.

Miss G. alone with Fiamma, refuses to give Fiamma her inhaler and calmly watches her die. Di returns just in time to see Miss G. placing the inhaler in Fiamma's lifeless hand. As others arrive to help, Miss G. and Di stare at each other as Di realises what happened.

Later, Di tells the other girls that Miss G. did not help Fiamma as she was dying. United, they confront Miss G. but are powerless to do anything. They quit the diving team and symbolically turn in their sashes. Di attempts to confess to the headmistress, who refuses to listen, wanting to protect the school's reputation. She releases Miss G. from her duties and declares the incident an unfortunate accident.

The final scene has Di leaving the school to explore the world, as both Fiamma and Miss G. had spoken of doing. Miss G. rents a small room in the local village. Completely alone now, she places her few personal possessions on her bedside table. She puts one item on the table, then quickly removes it to make room for another item. She counts the items to ensure there are only five. This reflects the school rule that only five personal items could be displayed on a night table at one time.

== Cast ==
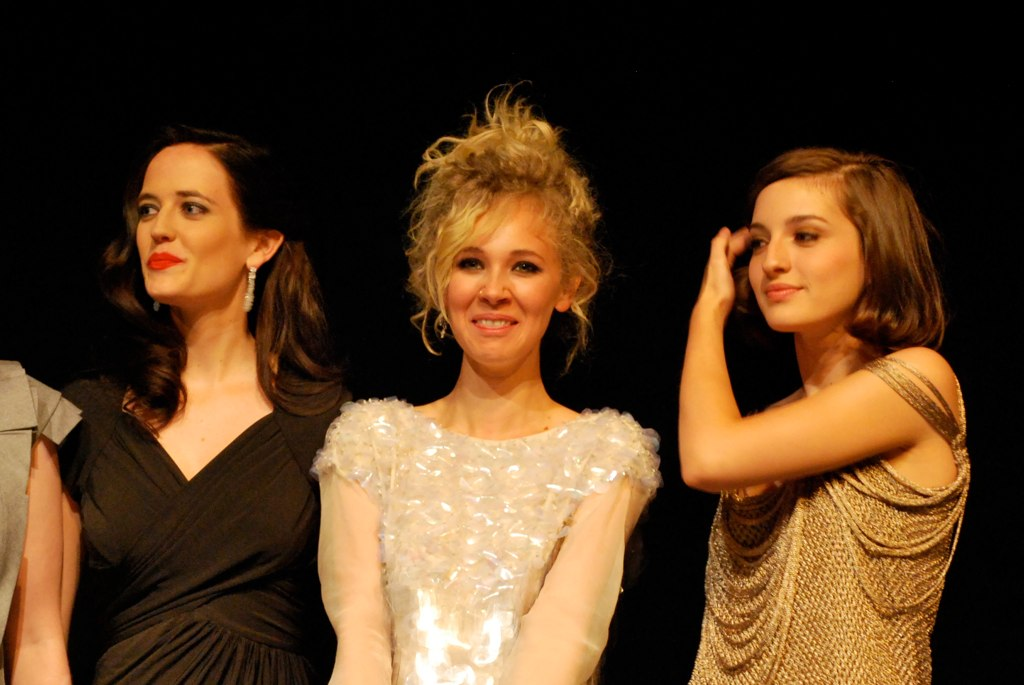
The lead actresses at the film's showing at the 2009 Toronto International Film Festival. Left to right: Eva Green, Juno Temple, and María Valverde

- Eva Green as Miss "G" Gribben, an institutionalised swimming and diving teacher who claims to be worldly wise but tells students adventure stories lifted from travel books as her own. She has difficulty in coping being outside of the school, even for local trips or inter school competitions.
- Juno Temple as Di Radfield
- Maria Valverde as Fiamma Coronna, a beautiful, widely travelled and well-read young Spanish aristocrat who is an excellent diver but is held back physically by asthma.
- Imogen Poots as Poppy
- Ellie Nunn as Lily
- Zoë Carroll as Rosie
- Adele McCann as Laurel
- Clemmie Dugdale as Fuzzy
- Sinéad Cusack as Miss Nieven
- Deirdre Donnelly as Miss Lacey

== Reception ==
Cracks received a mixed reception from critics. It has a score of 45% on Rotten Tomatoes, based on 51 critic reviews. The site's critical consensus reads: "Atomospheric but not much else, Cracks is a formless film in search of compelling drama." On Metacritic, the film has a score of 54 out of 100 based on 12 critic reviews.

== See also ==
- The Prime of Miss Jean Brodie (novel)
- Notes on a Scandal
