= Offred (The Handmaid's Tale episode) =

- The Handmaid's Tale episode
- Episode no.: Season 1 Episode 1
- Directed by: Reed Morano
- Teleplay by: Bruce Miller
- Original release date: April 26, 2017
- Running time: 57 minutes

Episode chronology
← Previous —	Next → "Birth Day"

"Offred" is the series premiere of the American television drama series The Handmaid's Tale. It was directed by Reed Morano, and written by Bruce Miller, adapting material from the 1985 Margaret Atwood novel The Handmaid's Tale. The episode debuted on the streaming service Hulu on April 26, 2017.

The Handmaid's Tale is set in a near-future dystopia in which a mysterious epidemic of infertility spontaneously affects women worldwide. The ensuing chaos results in a Dominionist Christian cult overtaking almost all of the United States, renaming it "Gilead" and enforcing a strictly patriarchal theocracy. The viewers follow a woman named June, more commonly known as "Offred" because she has been assigned to a man named "Fred" to bear him children. Fertile women such as June are known as "handmaids" and are forcibly conscripted to bear children for childless couples. Storytelling in the series is routinely non-linear as June has flashbacks to the time before Gilead's rise and a possible resistance movement.

"Offred" was released along with the second and third episodes of the series and the entire first season received widespread critical acclaim.

== Plot ==
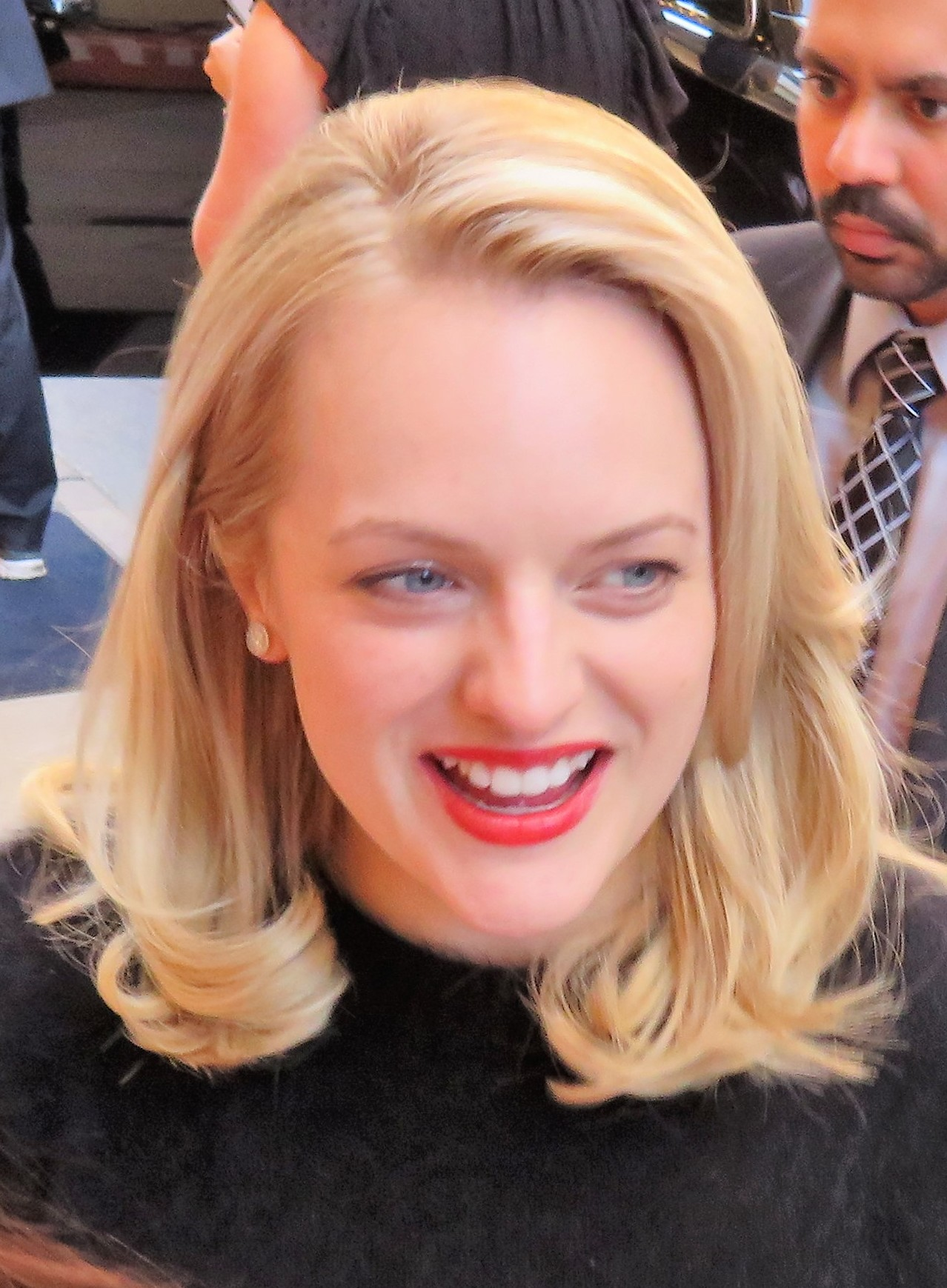
Series star and producer Elisabeth Moss in 2017

In a flashback sequence, June's family is pursued in the woods and armed men arrest her, kill her husband Luke, and abduct their child Hannah. Throughout the episode, viewers see subsequent flashbacks to June's detainment in a facility with other fertile women who are beaten and indoctrinated to believe that their destiny is to please God through being "handmaids"—women who are chosen to bear children for powerful couples who are infertile. Punishment is severe and strict for these women but also any other dissenters: academics, doctors, religious minorities (such as Catholics), and homosexuals.

In the present day, June is assigned to a new family and given the name "Offred"—all handmaids' names change to a construction "Of __", named after the male head of a household. Commander Fred Waterford is a powerful member of the ruling insurgency in Gilead. Offred is assigned mundane chores such as grocery shopping, and is periodically raped in "The Ceremony" wherein Waterford attempts to impregnate June while his wife Serena restrains her. Any time she is in public, she must wear modest clothing and refrain from eye contact with men; she is constantly accompanied by another handmaid called "Ofglen", whom June despises for Ofglen's piety. The streets are lined with armed guards and conspicuous black vans who abduct criminals in plain view to terrorize the populace.

One day, June and Ofglen attend a public ceremony at which a man accused of rape is to be killed. Handmaids are encouraged to savagely beat him in a "particicution" led by Aunt Lydia, the woman who abused them in the flashbacks. Offred gives into violent impulses and takes charge, kicking him to death. As she and Ofglen leave, Ofglen reveals that she does not believe in the theocratic cult ruling their lives and warns Offred that Offred's household has a spy known as an "Eye" who may report anything suspicious. This revelation empowers Offred to remember that her true name is June and to resolve to find Hannah.

== Production ==
The series was announced by Hulu in April 2016, with Elisabeth Moss starring as Offred and serving as one of the producers. The adaptation was created by Bruce Miller, who is an executive producer with Warren Littlefield, Fran Sears, and Daniel Wilson. Miller also wrote the first three episodes and the season finale "Night". Atwood serves as consulting producer, giving feedback on some of the areas where the series expands upon or modernizes the book and has a small cameo role in "Offred". That June, Reed Morano was announced as director of the series and Ann Dowd, Max Minghella, and Samira Wiley joined the cast in July, followed by Madeline Brewer, Joseph Fiennes, and Yvonne Strahovski the following month, and by Amanda Brugel and O. T. Fagbenle in September. In October, Ever Carradine was announced as another actor, and Alexis Bledel was added in January 2017.

Filming for the first season took place in Toronto, Mississauga, Hamilton, Burlington, Oakville, and Cambridge, Ontario, from September 2016 to February 2017. The series premiered on April 26, 2017.

== Reception ==
=== Critical reception ===
Critical assessment for the episode, first season, and series has been extremely positive. On review aggregator Rotten Tomatoes, the episode is assessed at 100% with an average rating of nine out of 10, based on 13 reviews, meaning that all critics surveyed recommended watching the episode. The website's critical consensus said, "Elizabeth Moss' expressive eyes speak volumes to unspeakable horrors in 'Offred,' an effective, if allusive, introduction to the bleak world of Gilead."

Awards and nominations for "Offred"
Year	Award	Category	Nominee(s)	Result
2017	Primetime Emmy Awards	Outstanding Supporting Actress in a Drama Series	Ann Dowd	Won
2017	Primetime Emmy Awards	Outstanding Directing for a Drama Series	Reed Morano	Won
2017	Primetime Emmy Awards	Outstanding Writing for a Drama Series	Bruce Miller	Won
2017	Primetime Creative Arts Emmy Awards	Outstanding Cinematography for a Single-Camera Series (One Hour)	Colin Watkinson	Won
2017	Primetime Creative Arts Emmy Awards	Outstanding Period/Fantasy Costumes for a Series, Limited Series, or Movie	Ane Crabtree and Sheena Wichary	Nominated
2017	Primetime Creative Arts Emmy Awards	Outstanding Production Design for a Narrative Contemporary or Fantasy Program (One Hour or More)	Julie Berghoff, Evan Webber, and Sophie Neudorfer	Won
2018	American Cinema Editors Awards	Best Edited Drama Series for Non-Commercial Television	Julian Clarke and Wendy Hallam Martin	Won
2018	Art Directors Guild Awards	One-Hour Contemporary Single-Camera Television Series	Julie Berghoff (for "Offred", "Birth Day", "Nolite Te Bastardes Carborundorum")	Won
2018	Cinema Audio Society Awards	Outstanding Achievement in Sound Mixing for Television Series – One Hour	John J. Thomson, Lou Solakofski, Joe Morrow, and Don White	Nominated
2018	Directors Guild of America Awards	Outstanding Directorial Achievement for a Drama Series	Reed Morano	Won
2018	USC Scripter Awards	Best Adapted TV Screenplay	Bruce Miller and Margaret Atwood	Won

=== Popular reception ===
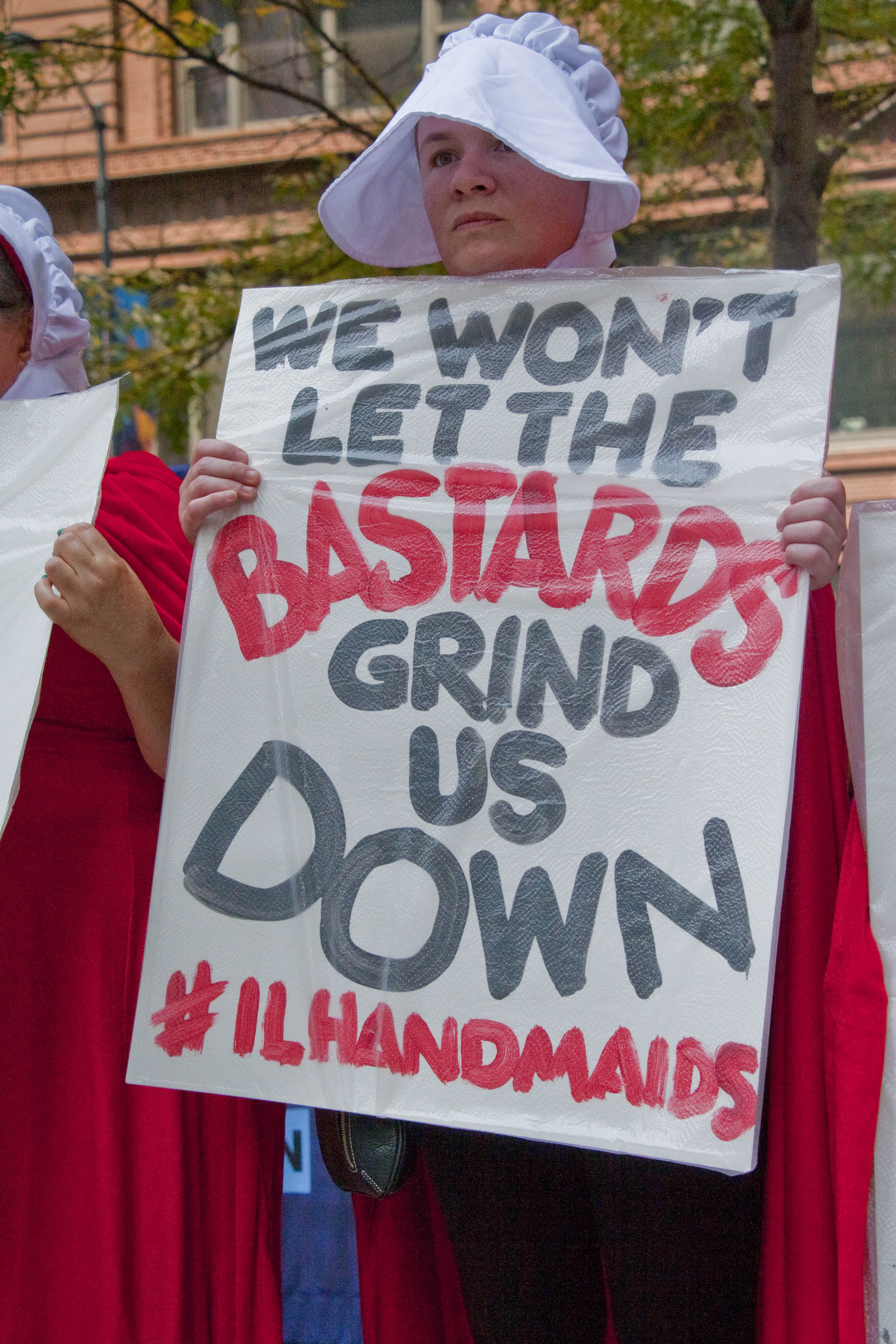
A woman at a 2018 rally dressed as a handmaid, protesting.

At the time this aired, digital streaming services like Hulu had no third-party services that publish ratings, such as Nielsen Media Research ratings for traditional broadcast television. Nielsen added Hulu and YouTube TV in July 2017. The commercial success of the first few episodes can only be inferred by the network's decision to pick up a second season the same day that the fourth episode aired (the first three all debuted on April 26), announcing that "Offred" was the most-watched debut of any program on Hulu. Women's rights activists began dressing as handmaids for political protests within three weeks of "Offred" airing and the trend has continued for subsequent events such as Brett Kavanaugh's 2018 Supreme Court nomination hearing and it had become a viral phenomenon by 2019, similar to Guy Fawkes masks used by Anonymous protestors several years prior.

== See also ==
- List of original programs distributed by Hulu
