= Cracks (novel) =

1999 novel by Sheila Kohler

- First edition
- Author: Sheila Kohler
- Language: English
- Genre: Psychological horror; Thriller
- Publisher: Zoland Books
- Publication date: 1 September 1999
- Publication place: United States
- Media type: Print
- Pages: 165
- ISBN: 158195008X

Cracks is the third novel by South African author Sheila Kohler. Published in 1999, it was chosen as one of the best books of the year by both Newsday and Library Journal. It was adapted into a 2009 film of the same name starring Eva Green.

== Plot introduction ==
The novel opens with twelve middle-aged women meeting at a South African boarding school where they were once pupils. Their reunion stirs memories of a long hot summer in the 1960s when they were the elite members of the school swimming team, managed by the forceful, charismatic Miss G. But the women share a secret concerning the fate of the missing 13th member of the swimming team: Fiamma, the enigmatic daughter of an Italian aristocrat and with whom Miss G becomes obsessed, leading to sexual jealousy and suspicion among the rest of the team, with tragic results.

== Inspiration ==
As revealed on the author‘s website, the violent death of her sister thirty years ago in apartheid South Africa caused her to explore in her fiction the theme of "violence within intimate relationships, in particular, the abuse of power and privilege".

One of the swimming team members in the book is named Sheila Kohler and is a writer. When asked whether this was herself she replied that "Although I use a character called Sheila Kohler, I don't think Cracks is any more autobiographical than my other books. It is simply a device to make the reader believe that what one's writing is all true - to blur the lines between fiction and nonfiction." and she goes on to explain about the book's setting, "The education we received in a girl's boarding school in the middle of the veld, was much like the one I describe in Cracks. We read nineteenth century literature exclusively, and our history lessons stopped before the first world war, which was considered too recent to be taught. Much of our time was devoted to doing sport to combat sexual urges, I presume, or anyway to teach us team spirit. Also, we were always going to chapel, learning to turn the other cheek. Consequently, life, when I was obliged to face it, came to me as an amazing revelation - and not always one with which I knew how to cope."

== Reception ==
- The Times Literary Supplement calls the novel brilliant and continues "A stunning and singular tale of the passion and tribalism of adolescence, Cracks lays bare the violence that lurks in the heart of even the most innocent. Shocking, reminiscent of Lord of the Flies ... conjures up the wildness of the veld and the passion and drama of adolescence...peculiarly satisfying.
- Elle also compares it to other works, "while evocative of The Prime of Miss Jean Brodie and Picnic at Hanging Rock, Kohler's writing is so smoothly confident and erotic that she has produced a tale resonant with a chilling power all its own."
- Kirkus Reviews concludes "The mystery is unfolded slowly but credibly, and its ending manages both to surprise and satisfy. First-rate psychological suspense, in the tradition of The Children’s Hour, played out flawlessly and well by a real master of narrative."
- Dana Schwartz on Teenreads.com is also full of praise: "There are secrets hidden in every sentence of this haunting and at times horrifying book --- secrets that you aren't aware of until you reach the final pages. It's an ending that makes you pause, and then flip back through to see what you missed the first time around. The tautly told story with its tropical backdrop of sterile humidity is in great contrast to the young women's budding fecundity."
- Publishers Weekly though has reservations: "Kohler narrates the story in the first-person plural: ""We always had cramps in our toes. Our hair was always wet. Our hands were always damp and cold and our fingers crinkled."" The curt ""we"" and Kohler's clipped, effective descriptions generate an abiding sense of myth, collective experience and collective guilt. At the same time, these tactics prevent readers from growing attached to any one individual, asking us to focus instead on the novel's rich mood. The result is a narrative at once powerful and hollow, an extremely well-made technical experiment. Finding at last how and why Fiamma vanished, some readers will feel the experiment justified; others may feel she was never really there."
