= Sheila Kohler =

South African author (born 1941)

Sheila Kohler (born 13 November 1941) is a South African author now living in the United States and the author of ten novels (including Cracks which was adapted into a 2009 film of the same name), and three short story collections. Her writing has appeared in The New York Times, O Magazine and included in the Best American Short Stories. She has twice won the O. Henry Award.

== Biography ==
Sheila Kohler was born 13 November 1941 in Johannesburg and educated at St. Andrew's School for Girls, where she matriculated in 1958 and earned a distinction in History. She then moved to Europe and spent 15 years in Paris, where she married and completed an undergraduate degree in literature at The Sorbonne (1973) and a graduate degree in psychology from Institut Catholique (1976). She moved to the United States in 1981 and obtained an MFA from Columbia University (1984). From 1995 to 2000 she taught at The New School and between 2000 and 2006 at Bennington College. She now teaches at Princeton University and Columbia, writes a blog for Psychology Today, and lives in New York City and Amagansett, Long Island. She has three daughters: Sasha Troyan, herself a published novelist, Cybele, and Brett Sheila is married to Dr. William Tucker, a psychiatrist.

== Writing ==
As revealed in the authors website, the violent death of her sister thirty years ago in apartheid South Africa caused her to explore in her fiction the theme of "violence within intimate relationships, in particular, the abuse of power and privilege." She explains that "Since then I have published nine novels, three collections of short stories, and several others not yet collected, all of which focus in some way on this theme". Her novel Open Secrets (2020) appeared in Vogue's list of the best novels of 2020, with Ian Malone writing, "The novel seduces and startles [...] as the suspense mounts, the scope of the novel is revealed: Russian liaisons, hidden dossiers, convenient suicides, and complicit children render a frightening—and thrilling—landscape."

=== Novels ===
- The Perfect Place (1989)
- The House on R Street (1994)
- Cracks (1999)
- The Children of Pithiviers (2001)
- Crossways (2004)
- Bluebird (2007)
- Becoming Jane Eyre (2009)
- Love Child (2011)
- The Bay of Foxes (2012)
- Dreaming for Freud (2014)
- Open Secrets (2020)

=== Collections ===
- Miracles in America (1990)
- One Girl (1998)
- Stories from Another World (2003)

=== Non-fiction ===
- Once We Were Sisters (2017)
