= Friends Stand United =

American anti-fascist vigilante street gang

Friends Stand United (FSU)
- Founded by: Elgin James
- Founding location: Boston, Massachusetts, U.S.
- Years active: Late 1980s–present
- Territory: United States

Friends Stand United (FSU) began as an anti-fascist, anti-racist, and anti-drug hardcore crew. It was founded in the late 1980s by Elgin James in Boston, Massachusetts, evolving out of the hardcore punk scene and in particular the straight edge subculture. While originally having a reputation for fighting against Neo-Nazis and racist groups, in later years FSU members were accused and charged for unprovoked violence and intimidation tactics. The group is classified by the Federal Bureau of Investigation (FBI) as a street gang.

== History ==
FSU grew out of the hardcore punk scene in Boston, Massachusetts, in the late 1980s. The group consisted primarily of members of the straight edge subculture, and while people of all races were allowed to join, members were predominantly white. The group is credited with expelling White supremacists, Neo-Nazi and other racist gangs from punk concerts in Boston in the late 1980s. According to Rolling Stone, FSU started out as "just another local [hardcore punk] crew", which were typically "fueled by young male aggression". According to Elgin James, one of the founding members, FSU "never really had a political agenda. It was more of a visceral reaction: ‘You're gonna call me a nigger? I'm gonna bash your face in with this fucking brick'." After fighting to eliminate the presence of Neo-Nazis from punk concerts in Boston, Elgin and other FSU members began robbing drug dealers.

FSU is said to have "fizzled out" after racists became less prominent in the hardcore scene, and has been described as reemerging in the mid-1990s with no clear agenda. The group began to get a reputation for becoming "the intimidating, bullying presence they once fought against". They were accused of violently confronting anyone they believed had crossed them, and of taking over and policing concerts. FSU officially stands for "Friends Stand United", however, in the punk scene it was more frequently known as "Fuck Shit Up".

By the early 2000s, there were FSU chapters in Portland (Maine), Philadelphia, Chicago, Arizona, Los Angeles, Seattle, upstate New York, and New Jersey. They were considered to have about 200 members. In 2004, FSU produced an official documentary film entitled Boston Beatdown Volume II; they previously released an underground video entitled Boston Beatdown. The film interviews members including James and discusses the group's formation. According to Rolling Stone, the film contains "disturbing footage of violent beatings in and around Boston clubs, ostensibly by members of FSU". The Federal Bureau of Investigation, which classified FSU as a street gang in 2009, states that James and other FSU members "boast" about their violent methods in the film and are shown repeatedly assaulting people at hardcore punk rock concerts and on Boston streets. James has stated that FSU is different from other outlaw organizations as they are not concerned with profiting from activities. Any involvement with selling guns, drugs, or prostitution would allegedly result in members being removed from the group. He insisted the group was a collection of individuals, though was described as the closest person they have to a leader.

In February 2005, six men with ties to FSU, including the president of the upstate New York chapter, were arrested following a thirty-six-year-old man, James Morrison, being bashed to death at a concert in New Jersey. FSU member Alex Franklin was arrested and charged with the murder of James Morrison. There is no clear agreement over the cause of the confrontation, though some media reports stated it was due to one of Morrison's friends wearing a shirt with a Confederate flag on it.

Throughout 2005, FSU members were accused of using violence and intimidation to control hardcore punk events on several occasions, including threatening the California band Dangers over a song they had written called "Neo-Neo Nazis," which criticized FSU's violence and intimidation tactics. Dangers cancelled one of their Seattle concerts following threats from FSU over the song. In response to these incidents, a group of Seattle venues, bands, and bookers were reported to be discussing ways to resist the group; there were calls for a complete boycott.

In December 2005, an FSU member was shot and killed in Arizona. According to the Arizona Daily Star, armed FSU members had invaded a concert and attacked patrons, one of whom ran to his car where he retrieved a firearm and shot an FSU member who had been chasing him with a machete. In March 2006, a Seattle police spokesperson stated there were three incidents of FSU members attacking strangers for no apparent reason in recent months, and several complaints of FSU members assaulting people in a local club. In March 2006, police searched 24 men standing outside a Seattle rock club, some wearing FSU clothing, and arrested four for carrying weapons. Three of the men carrying weapons were FSU members. One of those three, an ex-felon, was discovered to have a handgun and "28 grams of cocaine" for which he was charged for possession "with the intent to distribute."

Three FSU members were convicted of murder in 2006 in two separate incidents. In January, Lionel Bliss Jr., a member of FSU, was sentenced to five years for killing Matthew Carlo during a bar fight in Troy, New York. Five co-defendants were initially charged with gang assault, but charges against three were dropped due to alibis. While there is no clear agreement about the reason that altercation started, Bliss Jr. stated in court that Carlo "was responsible for someone else’s death in a vehicular homicide and was still out drinking. I think [his death] was karma.” In June, two California FSU members were charged and convicted of second-degree murder for beating Sean Gardhouse to death.

FSU members were interviewed regarding the founding of their crew and its violent activity for a 2008 National Geographic documentary about straight edge called "Inside Straight Edge" and a Gangland episode called, "Rage Against Society."

Elgin James left FSU in 2007, stating he had "been thinking a lot about violence and responsibility" since being interviewed regarding his involvement with the group by Rolling Stone earlier that year. At the time he was the last original founding member, with previous members having left and moved on to motorcycle clubs like the Outlaws and the Mongols. In 2011, James was sentenced to one year and one day in prison for attempting to extort $5,000 from an unidentified member of the band Mest in 2005. The Mest member had been targeted and beaten by FSU several times, and Elgin approached him saying the attacks could stop if he made a $5,000 donation to FSU. Upon being sentenced, Elgin stated he had faced his "day of reckoning. ... I have accepted responsibility for my past."

FSU activity continued on after Elgin's departure. In 2014, there was a brawl at a music festival in Ohio involving FSU members and a rival crew. One "witness stated that 50 to 100 men were armed with machetes and guns."

According to independent media organization Modern Insurgent, "FSU still exists in the form of various autonomous chapters in Boston, Philadelphia, Chicago, Arizona, Los Angeles, Seattle, Upstate New York, and New Jersey... Over the years, it appears that FSU has made attempts to keep a lower profile out of the public eye, only being well known to those within the hardcore scene." A founding member of the Philadelphia chapter of FSU, Joseph "Joe Hardcore" McKay, runs an annual festival called This Is Hardcore.
