= Elgin James =

American film director

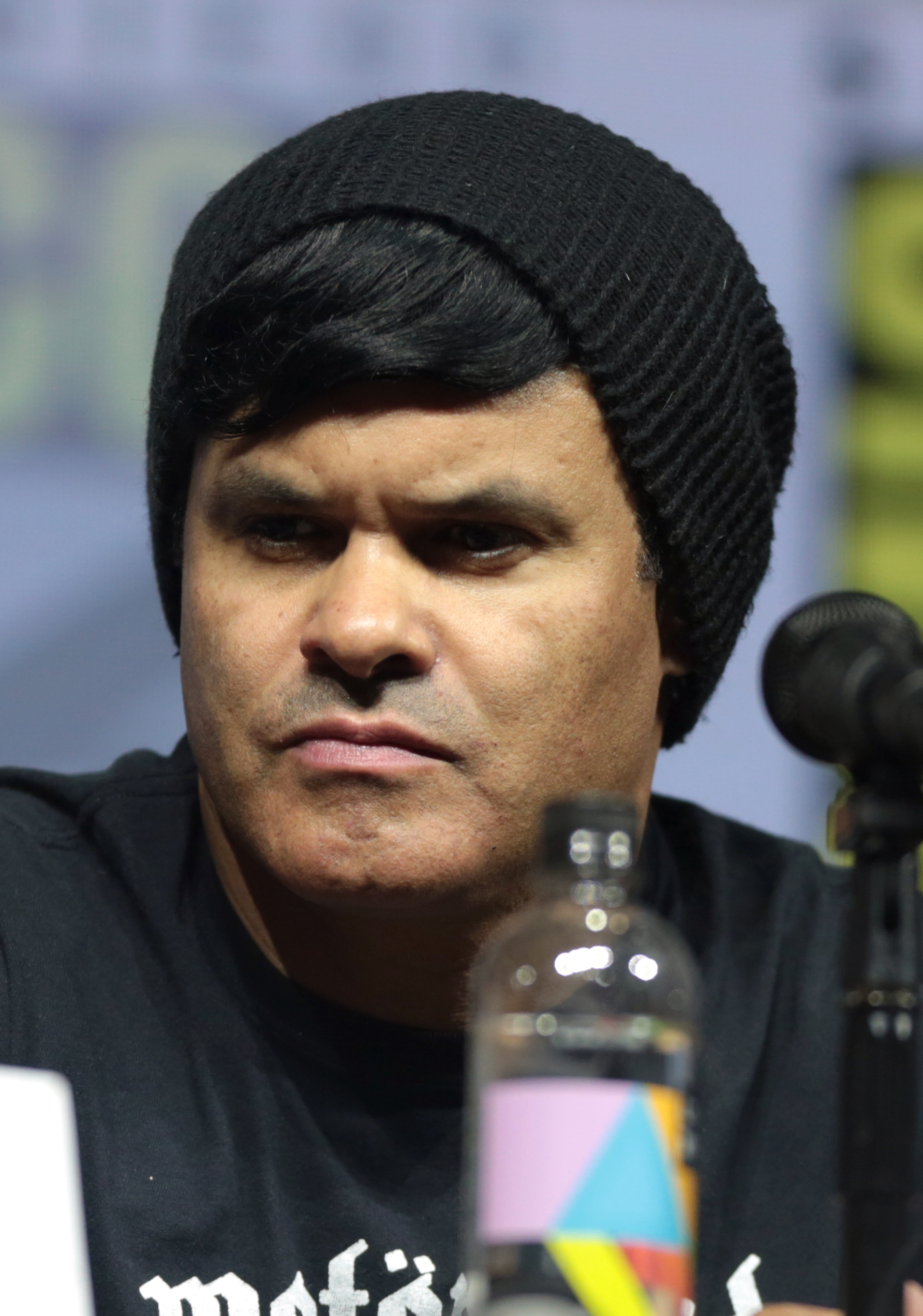
James at the 2018 San Diego Comic-Con

Elgin James is an American filmmaker, musician and a former member of Friends Stand United (FSU), a Boston, Massachusetts area anti-racist, Straight Edge group in the early 1990s which has been classified by several law enforcement agencies as a gang.

James left FSU in 2007, and the following year was announced as a fellow for the Sundance Screenwriters lab. He directed the film Little Birds in 2009, which was released shortly before James was arrested on historical charges relating to his activities with FSU, for which he was sentenced to one year in prison. Since his release from prison, James has co-written the 2016 film Lowriders, and co-created the TV series Mayans M.C. and the British comedy series The Outlaws.

== Early life and education ==
After a short time in orphanages and foster homes, James (who is of mixed race) was raised by civil rights activists on a rural farm in the North East United States. With a crop of marijuana in the backyard and alcohol and drug abuse in the house, James formed strong anti-drinking and anti-drug beliefs, which later led him to be a pivotal figure in the 1990s militant straight edge movement within the punk subculture. He also became a vegetarian at age 11 after watching the animals he raised on the farm slaughtered.

James discovered punk rock through an older foster brother and attended concerts by seminal hardcore punk bands Black Flag, Agnostic Front, and Millions of Dead Cops. He was arrested for the first time at 12, and by 14 he ended up in juvenile hall. There he rejected the pacifist beliefs of his parents (who had marched with Martin Luther King Jr. and became Freedom Riders), and began studying the writings of Malcolm X, Stokely Carmichael, and Huey P. Newton, fusing them with aggressive punk ideals.

James left juvenile hall, and inspired by civil rights attorneys William Kunstler and Morris Dees, left for Antioch College at age 17 to study pre-law. During a break in his first semester, he was involved in a gang fight and beaten in the back of the head with a baseball bat, which left him with left hemispheric brain damage. He was not able to speak or move the right side of his body. After intensive physical and speech therapy, he eventually recovered his speech and motor skills, but he ended up homeless, living on the streets and in squats across the country. He eventually settled in Boston, Massachusetts.

== FSU ==
In Boston, James began singing for hardcore punk band Wrecking Crew and befriended a multi-racial group of kids from Boston and Brockton, Massachusetts. They formed FSU, which originally stood for 'Fuck Shit Up' however came to be known as 'Friends Stand United' or 'Forever Stand United', for the purpose of purging violent white power skinheads from the Boston hardcore scene. Having successfully eliminated several of the dominating neo-Nazi groups, James turned his attention to drug dealers, going, in his words, “right after the heart of the enemy, money”. He would rob drug dealers and then give half of that money to local charities.

While part of FSU, James and other FSU members set up an "arms for hostages" scenario in which they traded handguns with inner city gang members for pit bulls used in dog fighting rings. The dogs would then be nursed back to health and fostered until safe homes were found for them.

The founding core of FSU eventually splintered, with a large section moving on to motorcycle gangs including the Outlaws. The split was amicable, but James and other founding members decided to leave a more positive legacy and steer FSU away from the criminal world. They established the Foundation Fund, which set up scholarships at Berklee College of Music and Suffolk University Law School in the names of FSU members who had died. The fund also holds yearly benefit concerts to raise money for charities that reflect "hardcore punk culture" (teen homelessness, anti-handgun violence, suicide prevention and local orphanages).

James left FSU in 2007, stating he'd "been thinking a lot about violence and responsibility" since being interviewed regarding his involvement with the group by Rolling Stone earlier that year. At the time he was the last original founding member. James and FSU were featured on National Geographic TV, the History Channel's Gangland series and in Rolling Stone magazine.

== Music and film career ==
James began his music career playing in straight edge hardcore bands such as Wrecking Crew, 454 Big Block and Righteous Jams. Later, James would experiment with country-influenced solo work that has been critically acclaimed and described as "hooligan folk" by the Boston Phoenix, and "folk-punk" by Wonkavision magazine.

In December 2008, James was announced as a fellow for the Sundance Screenwriters lab, and around 2009 he began working on Little Birds, loosely basing the film on his own life experiences. James was originally working on an autobiographical project about himself and his best friend who left their small towns and joined a gang in Boston. That film had Justin Timberlake attached to portray James and Nick Cassavetes attached to direct. But James was worried the film would ultimately "glamorize the violent lifestyle" he'd recently left behind, so he wrote Little Birds instead, substituting two fifteen-year-old girls for himself and his best friend. He chose to focus on the characters of "Lily" and "Alison" after seeing a teenage girl riding on the back of a bike in the Salton Sea, with James saying "You could just tell that she was on fire and she was never going to get out of there", referencing how he felt about being trapped in his own small town as a kid.

James finished Little Birds shortly before its screening in 2011 at the Sundance Film Festival before having to attend a trial for his actions while part of Friends Stand United. Little Birds received a positive reception at Sundance in 2011, though it has received more mixed reviews following its release. It holds a 59% approval rating on film review website Rotten Tomatoes.

== Arrest and prison ==
James was arrested by the FBI in Los Angeles, California on July 14, 2009, stemming from an incident four years earlier. He was charged with a criminal complaint of federal attempted extortion filed in Chicago. It is alleged that in 2005 James sanctioned an attack on an individual who had past ties to white power politics. James is then reported as to have said that the man could avoid further trouble if he made a $5,000 “donation” to FSU. After that incident, the FBI became involved, and after another attack, the victim scheduled a meeting with James to give the $5,000 while the FBI had surveillance on the encounter. The individual has been revealed to be a member of the band Mest. Speculation has been raised that lead singer Tony Lovato's previous ties to white power groups were the reason why the band was targeted, given FSU's anti-racist stance. However the specific Mest member who was targeted has not been revealed.

James was sentenced to one year and one day of prison by U.S. District Judge Suzanne B. Conlon in Chicago on March 8, 2011. Prosecutors had sought up to four years in prison, noting the extreme violence in which James had engaged in against Neo-Nazi skinheads. Over 60 letters of support were submitted on James' behalf, including letters from actor Ed Harris as well as Robert Redford, whom James has credited with helping him turn his life around. James told the New York Times that through working with Redford "I truly realized that I needed to leave the violence of that life behind.” In Robert Redford's letter to the judge he wrote "I believe that Elgin has the potential to make a difference. He has an important message for people of all ages and the possibility of change (and) the power of nonviolence."

The same day James was sentenced he was hired to write a screenplay for Brian Grazer and Universal Pictures. After the sentencing, James said in a statement that "The last few months have been a juxtaposition of the best and worst of my life. Today I faced my day of reckoning. … I have accepted responsibility for my past." James served his sentence at Metropolitan Detention Center. He was released on March 16, 2012.

== Discography ==
1992: Wrecking Crew, single, (vocals)
1995: 454 Big Block, "Your Jesus", Century Media (vocals)
1996: 454 Big Block, "s/t", single, Big Wheel Rec (vocals)
1997: 454 Big Block, "Save Me From Myself", Big Wheel Rec (vocals)
1997: The World is My Fuse, "s/t", single, Espo Records (vocals)
1998: The World Is My Fuse, "Drunk", single, Espo Records (vocals, guitars)
1999: The World Is My Fuse, "Good Intentions", Espo Records (vocals, guitars)
2002: The Jaded Salingers, "s/t", Espo Records (vocals, guitars)
2003: Elgin James "For Carol.." Lonesome Recordings (vocals, guitars)
2004: Elgin James, "Long Way Home", Lonesome Recordings comp (vocals, guitars)
2004: Righteous Jams "Rage Of Discipline", Broken Sounds (guitars)
2005: Elgin James, "Tinted Soft Green", Emusic Digital Singles Club (vocals, guitars)
2006: Righteous Jams "Business As Usual", Abacus Recordings (guitars)

== Filmography ==
=== Film ===
- Release (1998)
- Live Thee Fourth (2000)
- Boston Beatdown Vol. 2 (2004)
- Dark Planet: Visions of America (2005)
- Enemy (2007)
- Goodnight Moon by THINKFilms (2007, writer/director)
- Little Birds (2011, writer/director)
- Low Riders (2016, writer)

=== Television series ===
- Mayans M.C. (2018–2023, co-creator/writer/director/executive producer)
- The Outlaws (2021–2024, co-creator/writer)

== Awards and nominations ==
Year	Award	Category	Nominated work	Result
2011	Palm Springs International Film Festival	Directors to Watch	Little Birds	Won
2011	Sundance Film Festival	Grand Jury Prize	Little Birds	Nominated
2011	Zurich Film Festival	Golden Eye	Little Birds	Nominated
